= Leave =

Leave may refer to:

- Permission (disambiguation)
  - Permitted absence from work
    - Leave of absence, a period of time that one is to be away from one's primary job while maintaining the status of employee
    - Annual leave, allowance of time away from work while continuing to be paid
    - Leave (military), a period of time in which a soldier is allowed to be away from his or her assigned unit
  - Leave to enter, permission for entry to the United Kingdom granted by British immigration officers
  - Leave to remain, permanent residency in the United Kingdom
  - Leave to appeal, granted to the loser in a court case to appeal the verdict
  - Leave to prosecute, permission to bring a private prosecution of a criminal case
  - Leave of the house/senate, the term used to describe unanimous consent in Westminster system parliaments
- The pro-Brexit side of the Brexit debate (opposite of "Remain")

== Arts, entertainment, and media ==
- Leave (film), a 2010 film by Robert Celestino
- Leave (2022 film), a 2022 film by Alex Herron

=== Music ===
- Leave (album), a 2002 Mandopop album
- "Leave" (Get Out), a 2004 R&B song by JoJo
- "Leave!", a 2009 soul song performed by the English singer VV Brown
- "Leave", a song by Sertab Erener
- "Leave", a song by Marieme from her self-titled EP
- "Leave", a song by Matchbox Twenty from the album Mad Season
- "Leave", a song by Post Malone from the album Stoney
- "Leave", a song by R.E.M. from the album New Adventures in Hi-Fi
- "LEAVE", a song by Susumu Hirasawa from the album Detonator Orgun 2
- "Leave", a song by Wavves from the album Welcome to Los Santos
- "Leave", a song by Buffalo Springfield from the album Buffalo Springfield

== People ==
- Leave (gamer), gamertag of Xin Huang, professional esports player

== Sports ==
- Leave (cricket), the deliberate action of not hitting the ball

== See also ==
- Leaf
- Leaver (disambiguation)
- Leaves (disambiguation)
- Leaving (disambiguation)
- Left (disambiguation)
