= 1994 Champ Car season =

The 1994 Champ Car season may refer to:

- the 1993-94 USAC Championship Car season, which was just one race, the 78th Indianapolis 500
- the 1994 PPG Indy Car World Series, sanctioned by CART, who later became Champ Car
