= Consent =

Voluntary agreement to another's proposal

Consent occurs when one person voluntarily agrees to the proposal or desires of another. It is a term of common speech, with specific definitions used in such fields as law, medicine, research, and sexual consent. Consent, as understood in specific contexts, may differ from its everyday meaning. For example, a person with a mental disorder, a low mental age, or under the legal age of sexual consent may willingly engage in a sexual act that still cannot meet the legal threshold for consent as defined by applicable law.

United Nations agencies and initiatives in sex education programs believe that teaching the topic of consent as part of comprehensive sexuality education is beneficial. Types of consent include implied consent, express consent, informed consent, and unanimous consent.

== Types ==
- An express consent is one that is unmistakably stated, rather than implied. It may be given in writing, e.g. in a contract, by speech (orally), or non-verbally, e.g. by a clear gesture such as a nod. Non-written express consent not evidenced by witnesses or in an audio or video recording may be disputed if a party denies that it was given.
- Implied consent is consent inferred from a person's actions and the facts and circumstances of a particular situation (or, sometimes, by a person's silence or inaction). Examples include unambiguously soliciting or initiating sexual activity or the implied consent to physical contact by participants in a hockey game or being assaulted in a boxing match.
- Informed consent in medicine is consent given by a person who has a clear appreciation and understanding of the facts, implications, and future consequences of an action. The term is also used in other contexts, such as in social-science research, when participants are asked to affirm that they understand the research procedure and consent to it, or in sex, where informed consent means each person engaging in sexual activity is aware of any positive statuses (for sexually transmitted infections and/or diseases) to which they might expose themselves.
- Unanimous consent, or general consent, by a group of several parties (e.g., an association) is consent given by all parties.
- Substituted consent, or the substituted judgment doctrine, allows a decision-maker to establish the decision an incompetent person would have made if they were competent.
- Advance consent, where consent is given in advance, is generally considered not valid with certain exceptions depending on jurisdiction for advance healthcare directives, commercial contracts, and others.
- Consent can be defined according to substantive equality.
- In international law, consent involves states, not individuals. Consent is a crucial principle of international law that necessitates the agreement of all relevant parties for any changes in rules to be legally binding. However, some legal scholars propose that a consensus among states, rather than the explicit consent of each state, may be the standard by which a rule is considered obligatory and enforceable.
- Congee can represent a formal consent or permission.

== Internet and digital services ==
The concept of end-user given consent plays an important role in digital regulations such as the European General Data Protection Regulation (GDPR). The GDPR (Article 6) defines a set of different legal bases for the lawful processing of personal data. End-users' consent is only one of these possible bases. However, because of the GDPR enforcement (in 2018) and other legal obligations, data controllers (online service providers) have widely developed consent-obtaining mechanisms in recent years. According to the GDPR, end-users' consent should be valid, freely given, specific, informed, and active. But the lack of enforceability regarding obtaining lawful consent has been a challenge in the digital world. As an example, a 2020 study, showed that the Big Tech, i.e. Google, Amazon, Facebook, Apple, and Microsoft (GAFAM), use dark patterns in their consent obtaining mechanisms, which raises doubts regarding the lawfulness of the obtained consent.

== Tort ==
Consent can be expressed or implied. For example, participation in a contact sport usually implies consent to contact with other participants, implicitly agreed and often defined by the rules of the sport. Another specific example is where a boxer cannot complain of being punched on the nose by an opponent; implied consent will be valid where the violence is ordinarily and reasonably to be contemplated as incidental to the sport in question. Express consent exists when there is oral or written agreement, particularly in a contract. For example, businesses may require that persons sign a waiver (called a liability waiver) acknowledging and accepting the hazards of an activity. This proves express consent and prevents the person from filing a tort lawsuit for unauthorised actions.

In English law, the principle of volenti non fit injuria (Latin: "to a willing person, injury is not done") applies not only to participants in sport but also to spectators and to any others who willingly engage in activities where there is a risk of injury. Consent has also been used as a defense in cases involving accidental deaths during sex, which occur during sexual bondage. Time (May 23, 1988) referred to this latter example as the "rough-sex defense". It is not effective in English law in cases of serious injury or death.

As a term of jurisprudence, prior provision of consent signifies a possible defence (an excuse or justification) against civil or criminal liability. Defendants who use this defense argue that they should not be held liable for a tort or a crime, since the actions in question took place with the plaintiff or "victim's" prior consent and permission.

== Medicine ==
In medical law, consent is important to protect a medical practitioner from liability for harm to a patient arising from a procedure. There are exemptions, such as when the patient cannot give consent.

Also, a medical practitioner must explain the significant risks of a procedure or medication (those that might change the patient's mind about whether to proceed with the treatment) before the patient can give binding consent. This was explored in Australia in Rogers v Whitaker. If a practitioner does not explain a material risk that subsequently eventuates, then that is considered negligent. These material risks include the loss of a chance of a better result if a more experienced surgeon had performed the procedure. In the UK, a Supreme Court judgment modernized the law on consent and introduced a patient-focused test to UK law: allowing the patient rather than the medical professionals to decide upon the level of risk they wish to take in terms of a particular course of action, given all the information available. This change reflects the Guidance of the General Medical Council on the requirement to consent to patients and removes the rule of medical paternalism.

== Social science research ==
Social scientists are generally required to obtain informed consent from research participants before asking interview questions or conducting an experiment. Federal law governs social science research that involves human subjects, and tasks institutional review boards (IRBs) at universities, federal or state agencies, and tribal organizations to oversee social science research that involves human subjects and to decide whether informed consent is necessary for a social scientific study to go forward. Informed consent in this context generally means explaining the study's purpose to research participants and obtaining a signed or verbal affirmation that the study participants understand the procedures to be used and consent to take part in the study.

Some types of social scientific research, such as psychological experiments, may use deception as part of the study; in these cases, researchers may not fully describe the procedures to participants, and thus participants are not fully informed. However, researchers are required to debrief participants immediately after the experiment is concluded. Certain populations are considered vulnerable, and besides informed consent, special protections must be made available to them. These include persons who are incarcerated, pregnant women, persons with disabilities, and persons who have a mental disability. Children are considered unable to provide informed consent.

== Planning law ==
Some countries, such as New Zealand with its Resource Management Act and its Building Act, use the term "consent" for the legal process that provides planning permission for developments like subdivisions, bridges or buildings. Achieving permission results in getting "Resource consent" or "Building consent".

== Sexual activity ==
In Canada, "consent means [...] the voluntary agreement of the complainant to engage in sexual activity" without abuse or exploitation of "trust, power or authority", coercion or threats. Consent can also be revoked at any moment. The Supreme Court of British Columbia ruled that badgering alone, followed by an agreement, does not meet the threshold of coercion to vitiate consent.

Sexual consent plays an important role in defining what sexual assault is, since sexual activity without consent by all parties is rape. In the late 1980s, academic Lois Pineau argued we must move towards a more communicative model of sexuality so that consent becomes more explicit and clear, objective and layered, with a more comprehensive model than "no means no" or "yes means yes". Many universities have instituted campaigns about consent. Creative campaigns with attention-grabbing slogans and images that market consent can be effective tools to raise awareness of campus sexual assault and related issues.

Since the late 1990s, new models of sexual consent have been proposed. Specifically, the development of "yes means yes" and affirmative models, such as Hall's definition: "the voluntary approval of what is done or proposed by another; permission; agreement in opinion or sentiment." Hickman and Muehlenhard state that consent should be "free verbal or nonverbal communication of a feeling of willingness' to engage in sexual activity." Affirmative consent may still be limited since the underlying individual circumstances of the consent cannot always be acknowledged in the "yes means yes", or in the "no means no", model.

Some individuals cannot give consent. Minors below a certain age, the age of sexual consent in that jurisdiction, are deemed not able to give valid consent by law to sexual acts. Likewise, persons with Alzheimer's disease or similar disabilities may be unable to give legal consent to sexual relations, even with their spouse.

Within literature, definitions surrounding consent and how it should be communicated have been contradictory, limited, or without consensus. Roffee argued that legal definitions need to be universal to avoid confusion in legal decisions. He also demonstrated how the moral notion of consent does not always align with the legal concept. For example, some adult siblings or other family members may voluntarily enter a relationship; however, the legal system still deems this as incestual, and therefore a crime. Roffee argues that the use of particular language in the legislation regarding these familial sexual activities manipulates the reader to view it as immoral and criminal, even if all parties are consenting. Similarly, some children under the legal age of consent may knowingly and willingly choose to be in a sexual relationship. However, the law does not view this as legitimate. Whilst there is a necessity for an age of consent, it does not allow for varying levels of awareness and maturity. Here it can be seen how a moral and a legal understanding do not always align.

Initiatives in sex education programs are working towards including and foregrounding topics of and discussions of sexual consent in primary, high school, and college Sex Ed curricula. In the UK, the Personal Social Health and Economic Education Association (PSHEA) is working to produce and introduce Sex Ed lesson plans in British schools that include lessons on "consensual sexual relationships," "the meaning and importance of consent" as well as "rape myths". In U.S., California-Berkeley University has implemented affirmative and continual consent in education and in the school's policies. In Canada, the Ontario government has introduced a revised Sex Ed curriculum to Toronto schools, including new discussions of sex and affirmative consent, healthy relationships and communication.

=== Affirmative consent ===
Affirmative consent (enthusiastic yes) is when both parties agree to sexual conduct, either through clear verbal communication or nonverbal cues or gestures. It involves communication and the active participation of the people involved. This is the approach endorsed by colleges and universities in the U.S., which describe consent as an "affirmative, unambiguous, and conscious decision by each participant to engage in mutually agreed-upon sexual activity." According to Yoon-Hendricks, a staff writer for Sex, Etc., "Instead of saying 'no means no,' 'yes means yes' looks at sex as a positive thing." Ongoing consent is sought at all levels of sexual intimacy, regardless of the parties' relationship, prior sexual history, or current activity ("Grinding on the dance floor is not consent for further sexual activity," a university policy reads). By definition, affirmative consent cannot be given if a person is intoxicated, unconscious, or asleep.

There are 3 pillars often included in the description of sexual consent, or "the way we let others know what we're up for, be it a good-night kiss or the moments leading up to sex."

They are:

1. Knowing exactly what and how much I'm agreeing to
2. Expressing my intent to participate
3. Deciding freely and voluntarily to participate

To obtain affirmative consent, rather than waiting to say or for a partner to say "no", one gives and seeks an explicit "yes". This can come as a smile, a nod, or a verbal yes, as long as it is unambiguous, enthusiastic, and ongoing. "There's varying language, but the language gets to the core of people having to communicate their affirmation to participate in sexual behavior," said Denice Labertew of the California Coalition Against Sexual Assault. "It requires a fundamental shift in how we think about sexual assault. It's requiring us to say women and men should be mutually agreeing and actively participating in sexual behavior."

=== Critiques of affirmative consent ===
The above concept of affirmative consent has become more mainstream and promoted in public discourse, institutions, and the workplace, especially following the #MeToo scandals. However, feminists from varying political backgrounds have voiced concerns and critiques of affirmative consent as a solution to both sexual assault and creating sexual equality and autonomy between all genders. If women, queer people, and other marginalized groups are not free to say no, why would they be free to say yes? Feminists have been seeking for more transformative alternatives that go beyond a (verbal) agreement between sexual partners, examining the issue as a political question related to power structures, the influence of neoliberal perceptions of the self and the complexity of human desire.

==== Neoliberal contractualism and rationalism ====
The common form of affirmative consent assumes that humans act as rational and independent beings who, at any point in any interaction, are fully aware of what they are (not) consenting to, whether they want to and can make a conscious, valid decision. Consent, as it is practiced now, thus requires us to rationalize desires and prioritize thinking over feeling, and reason over emotions. The resulting consent is shaped in a neoliberal form of contractualism, which makes a withdrawal of consent or a change in the conditions of the activity at stake rather challenging. This form of consent, as a contract, assumes consent to happen between two (or more) individuals and rational actors, and it does not give room to forms of discomfort, vulnerability, or discussion within the practice consented to. This contractualism mostly relies on verbal, affirmative consent and overlooks non-verbal or alternative ways of consenting. The latter is rather essentializing signs of affirmation and, due to its reliance on verbal consent in form of understandable words, can be ableist by invalidating non-verbal consent. Furthermore, contractualism assumes consent to be rational by nature and implies that we always know rationally whether we want to consent to something. However, especially in the sphere of interpersonal sexual and non-sexual activities, our own needs or desires are not always rational but can rather be ambiguous, contradicting or unclear. Consent as neoliberal contractualism cannot include and reflect this ambiguity and the lack of rationality.

==== Socio-cultural vs legal debate ====
Arguably, there is a distinction that is rarely made in the debate around consent: the socio-cultural and the legal. While talking about consent, arguments are often informed and talked about within a legal framework: What do we need to be protected in the current legal framework? Which formulations give the best protection to victims of sexual violence? However, when talking about this protection, there is also a need for protection through prevention, a protection by society rather than the law.

While it is not necessarily a given that affirmative consent provides the best legal protection for victims without taking away their agency, there is another danger in linking the legal debate and our overall understanding of consent. Relying on the legal framework and presenting these as the question of consent takes away the need for change and discussion on the socio-cultural level that has the potential to offer even more complexity, flexibility and room to rethink our sexual and overall encounters beyond the protection against violence. A socio-cultural debate would be one around our needs, attitudes, and behaviors and the changes needed, which arguably is a more complex debate to hold and handle. With a certain level of protection this complexity is needed though to rethink our encounters beyond the mantras of 'no means no' and 'only yes means yes', something that is not reductionist to be applied in a legal setting and that gives the possibility to imagine interactions beyond the current status quo.

== In popular culture ==
Comedian Jimmy Carr explains consent as a "one-use deal: one consent per action", with the key to consent being communication: "talk to the girl you're with... [consent] is dirty talk done right". He also stresses the importance of enthusiastic consent, explaining it as a match between "what she says and her body language... if a girl says yes to sex with you, but she says it through gritted teeth like she's in a fucking horror movie... don't!"

== See also ==
- Age of consent
- Assumption of risk
- Consent of the governed
- Pacta sunt servanda
- Saverland v Newton
- Prenuptial agreement
- Sex positive
- Sociocracy (decision-making by consent)
- Victim blaming
- Volenti non fit injuria
- Voluntary taxation
  - Taxation as theft
