= Leaving =

Leaving or Leavin' may refer to:

== Film, theatre and television ==
- Leaving (TV series), a 1984–1985 UK series featuring Keith Barron and Susan Hampshire
- Leaving (1997 film), a Japanese film starring Kotomi Kyono
- Leaving (play), a 2007 play by Václav Havel
  - Leaving (2011 film), a Czech film directed by Václav Havel and based on his play
- Leaving (2009 film), a French film by Catherine Corsini
- Leaving, a 2012 UK television series featuring Linzey Cocker
- The Leaving, a 2018 Philippine animated film
- "Leaving" (Butterflies), a 1979 television episode
- "Leaving" (Watching), a 1987 television episode

== Music ==
=== Albums ===
- Leaving (album), a 1976 album by Richard Beirach and Jeremy Steig
- Leavin' (album), a 2006 album by Natalie Cole

=== EP ===
- Leaving (EP), a 2013 EP by Skrillex whose title track is "Leaving"

=== Songs ===
- "Leavin' " (Tony! Toni! Toné! song), 1994
- "Leaving", a 2000 song by the Indigo Girls from Retrospective
- "Leaving", a 2001 song by The Starting Line from With Hopes of Starting Over...
- "Leavin' " (Jesse McCartney song), 2008
- "Leaving", a 2009 song by Westlife from Where We Are
- "Leaving" (Pet Shop Boys song), 2012
- "Leaving", the title track from Leaving (EP) by Skrillex, 2013
- "Leavin" (Rod Wave song), 2025

== See also ==
- Leave (disambiguation)
- Leaves (disambiguation)
- Left (disambiguation)
