= Historical Permission Notice and Disclaimer =

- Author: Bruce A. Dodson
- Publisher: Bruce A. Dodson
- Published: 9 November 2002
- SPDX identifier: HPND
- FSF approved: Yes
- OSI approved: Yes
- GPL compatible: Yes
- Copyleft: No
- Linking from code with a different licence: Yes
- Website: https://opensource.org/licenses/HPND at the Wayback Machine (archived January 29, 2023)
- Deprecated: Yes

The Historical Permission Notice and Disclaimer (HPND) is an open source license, approved by the Open Source Initiative (OSI) and verified as GPL-compatible by the Free Software Foundation.

== Characteristics ==
It is unique among the OSI's licenses because of the choices it allows in its construction.

It lets the licensor pick anywhere from 0-2 warranty disclaimers, whether they want to prohibit the author's name from being used in publicity or advertising surrounding a distribution (like in the BSD License), and other spelling and grammar options.

Besides this, the license can be almost functionally identical to the new, 3-clause BSD License (if the option for the no-promotion clause is exercised), or the MIT License (if the option for the no-promotion clause is not exercised).

Variants of this license are in use primarily in older software, including the original BSD kernel. Today, it is most popular to choose either the new 3-clause BSD License or the MIT License to meet the licensing needs of the developer.

This is the only OSI-certified license (excluding the public domain) that can lack a disclaimer of warranty.

The license was deprecated by its author, Bruce A. Dodson, prior to 24 September 2009.
