= Saverland v Newton =

English court case

Saverland v. Newton (1837) is a court case in which a British man named Thomas Saverland brought an action against Mrs Caroline Newton, who had bitten off the left half of his nose after he attempted to kiss her without consent. The judge ruled against him, stating that "When a man kisses a woman against her will, she is fully entitled to bite his nose off, if she so pleases." The existence of this case or findings is not available in known court documents. Its recounting and/or existence is based upon newspaper accounts.

== Contemporary newspaper account ==
The case as covered in the Bell's New Weekly Messenger, April 30, 1837, p. 6-7.

A DEARLY-BOUGHT KISS

Caroline Newton was indicted for assaulting Thomoas Saverland and biting off his nose. The complainant, whose face bore incontestible evidence of the severe injury inflicted, the fleshy part of the left nostril being completely gone, stated that on the day after Christmas Day he was in a tap-room where were defendant and her sister. The sister laughingly observed that she had left her young man down at Birmingham, and had promised him no man should kiss her while absent. Complainant regarded this observation as a challenge, especially it being holiday time, and caught hold of her and kissed her. She took it in good part as joke, but defendant became angry, and desired she might have as little of that kind of fun as he pleased. Complainant told her if she was angry he would kiss her also and tried to do it. A scuffle ensued, and they both fell to the ground. After they got up complainant went and stood by the fire, and the defendant followed and struck at him. He again closed with her and tried to kiss her, and in the scuffle he was heard to cry out, She has got my nose in her mouth.” When they parted he was bleeding profusely from the nose, and a portion of it, which defendant had bitten off, she was seen to spit out of her mouth upon the ground. The defendant, a fat, middle-aged woman, treated the matter with great levity, and said he had no business to kiss her sister, or attempt to kiss her, in a public house; they were not such kind of people.

If she wanted to be kissed, she had a husband to kiss her, and he was a much handsomer man than defendant ever was, even before he lost his nose. The Chairman told the jury that it mattered little which way their verdict went. If they found her guilty the court would not fine her more than 1s., as the prosecutor had brought the punishment on himself. The jury, without hesitation, acquitted her. The Chairman told the prosecutor he was sorry for the loss of his nose, but if he would play with cats, he must expect to get scratched. Turning to the jury, the Chairman afterwards said, "Gentlemen, my opinion is that if a man attempts to kiss a woman against her will, she has a right to bite his nose off if she has a fancy for so doing."-"And eat it too," added a learned gentleman at the bar. The case caused much laughter to all except the poor complainant.

== Precedents ==
The case was a forerunner of sexual harassment cases to come and asserted that a woman was permitted to defend her virtue, by force if necessary.

== See also ==
- No Means No
