= Left =

Left may refer to:

== Music ==
- Left (Hope of the States album), 2006
- Left (Monkey House album), 2016
- Left (Helmet album), 2023
- "Left", a song by Nickelback from the album Curb, 1996

== Direction ==
- Left (direction), a body-relative direction
- Left-handedness, a tendency to use one's left hand

== Politics ==
- Left (Austria), a 2008 communist electoral alliance
- The Left (Germany), a German political party (founded 2007)
- Left-wing politics (the left or leftism), egalitarian ideologies
  - Centre-left politics
  - Far-left politics

== See also ==
- Copyleft
- Leaving (disambiguation)
- Lefty (disambiguation)
- Sinister (disambiguation)
- Venstre (disambiguation)
- The Left (disambiguation)
- Right (disambiguation)
