= Moderate Venstre =

Moderate Venstre may refer to:

- Moderate Venstre (Denmark), a former political party in Denmark
- Moderate Liberal Party, a former political party in Norway

== See also ==
- Moderate left
- Venstre (disambiguation)
