= List of Lehigh University engineering highlights =

== Engineering highlights ==
Lehigh University students, faculty and alumni have made significant contributions to the nation and the field of engineering, not limited to but including:

=== Columbia Space Shuttle forensics ===
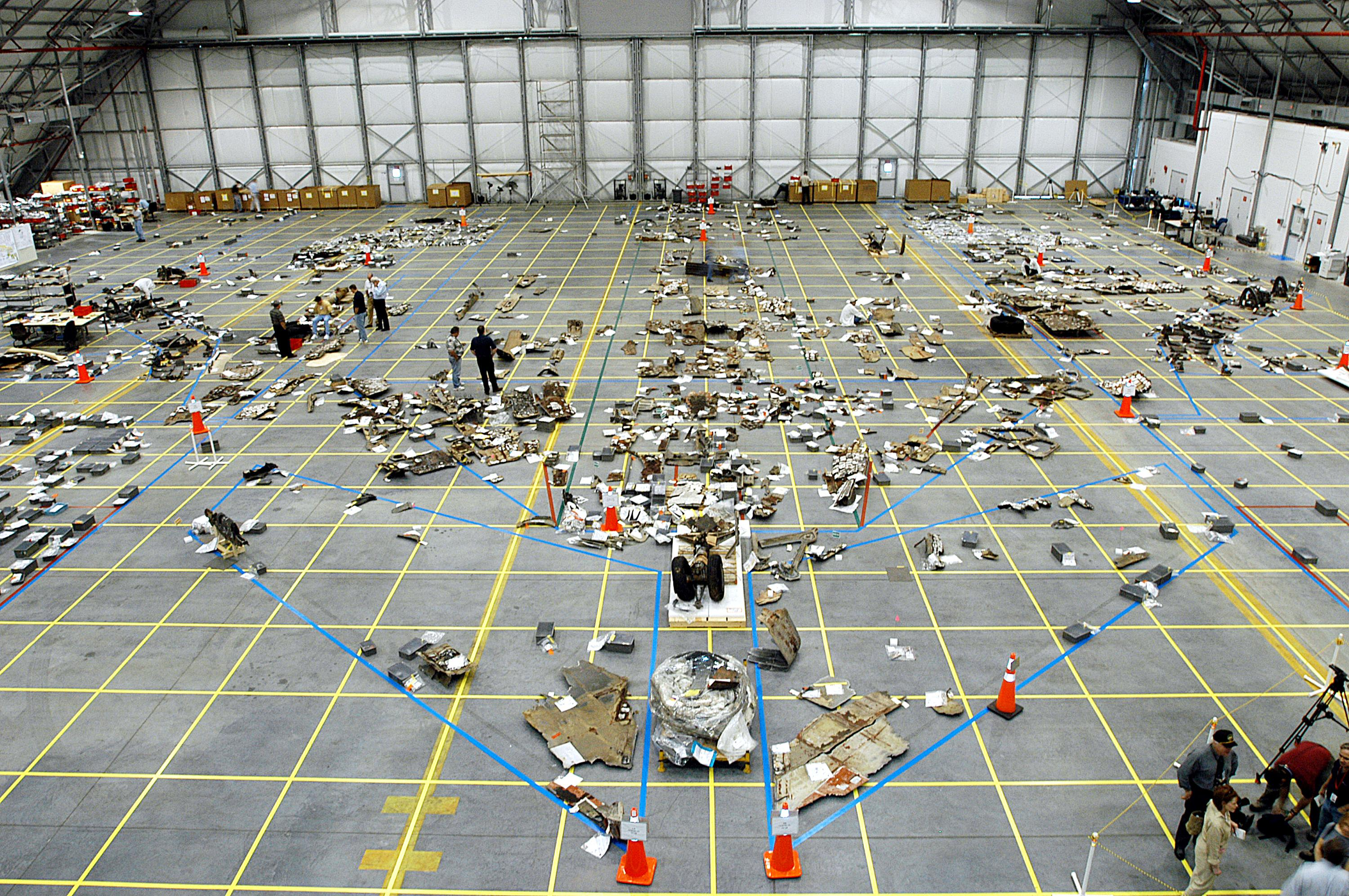
Columbia debris grid

Following the 2003 Columbia Space Shuttle disaster, NASA asked Lehigh exclusively to assist in the analysis of debris. Students of the Materials Science and Engineering department then reported findings of the forensic analysis during a two-day joint Lehigh-NASA symposium. This became part of their senior project, a requirement for graduation. Lehigh was the first university to investigate the debris due to its advanced microscope technology.

=== The escalator ===
Jesse W. Reno, an 1883 engineering graduate of Lehigh University invented the first escalator and installed it as an amusement ride at Coney Island, New York in 1897. This particular device was an inclined belt with wooden slats or cleats on the surface for traction. The incline was as steep as 25°. Reno sold this machine to the Otis Elevator Company in 1899, and together they produced the first commercial escalator. This escalator won a first prize at the Paris 1900 Exposition Universelle in France. Some escalators of this vintage were still being used in the Boston subway until 1994.

=== First commercial product manufactured in space ===
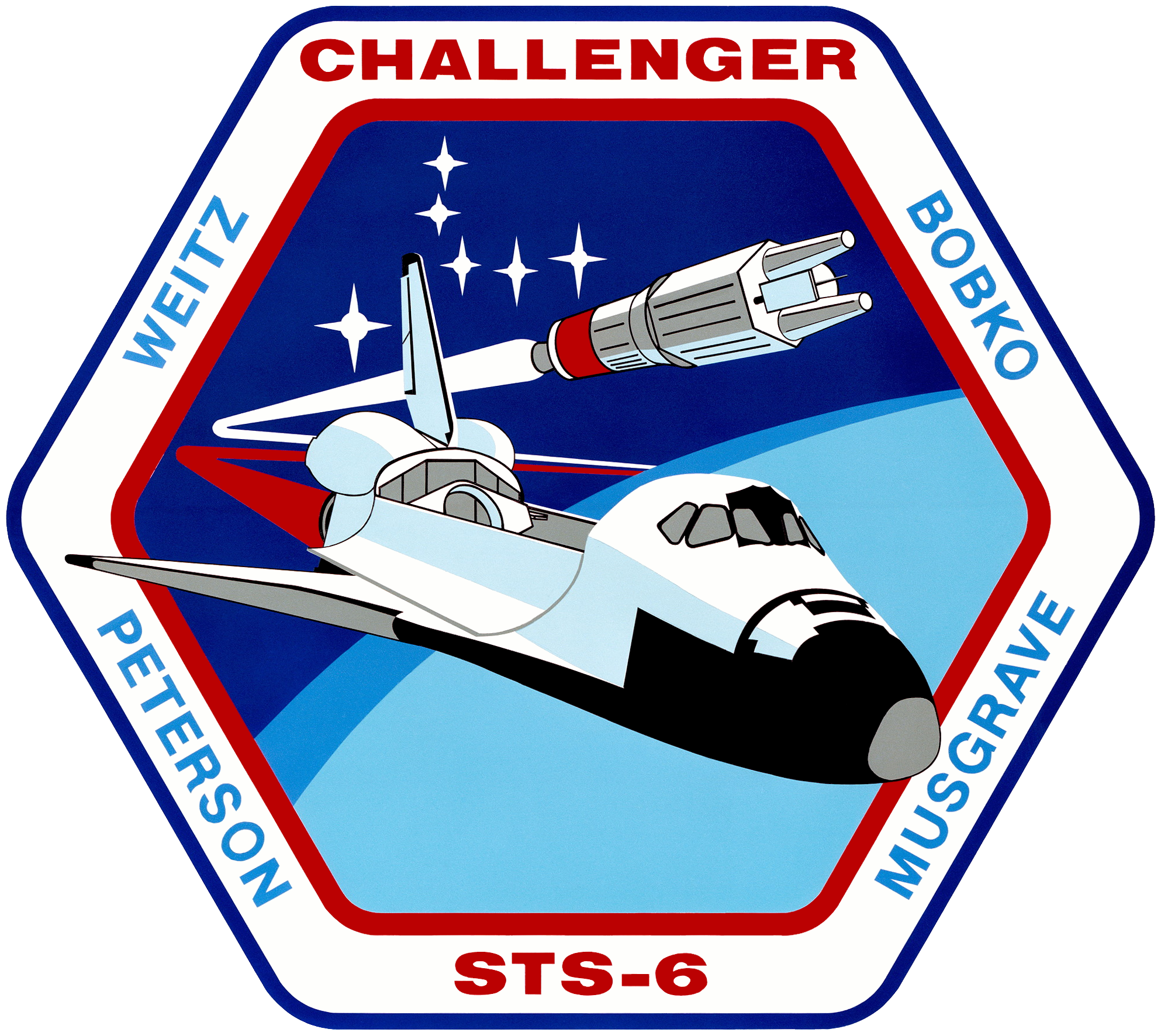
STS-6 mission patch

The first commercial product manufactured in space were microscopic polystyrene beads, 10 μm in diameter, that were made during STS-6 aboard the Space Shuttle Challenger April 4–9, 1983. The beads were made to be used for the calibration of particle size measuring instruments such as optical and electron microscopes. The manufacturing process took advantage of being able to form near perfect spheres in a microgravity environment. The technology necessary to produce the beads was jointly developed by Lehigh University and NASA.

=== Ford Mustang ===
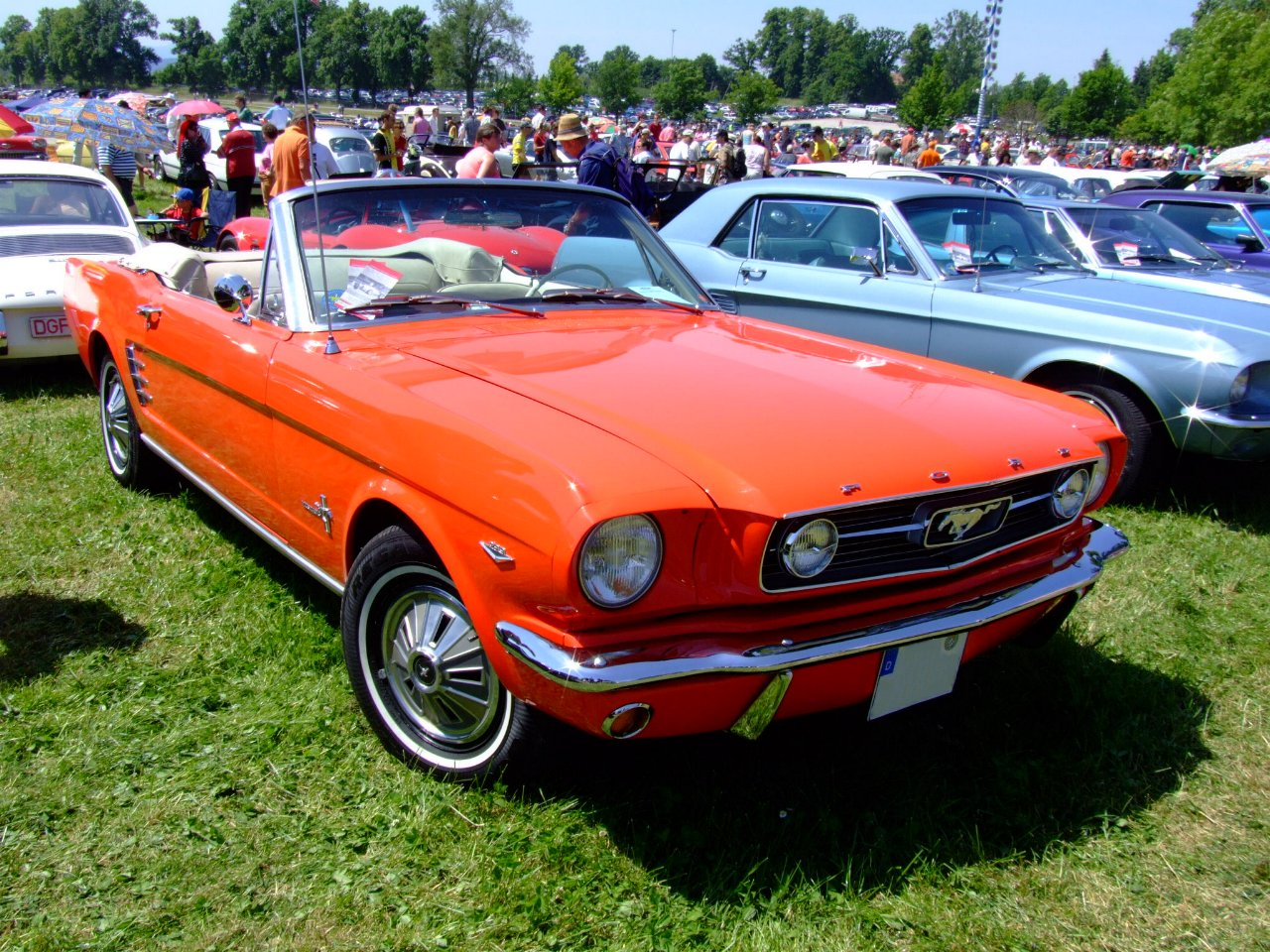
Ford Mustang

The legendary Ford Mustang, the first of the "pony" cars, was developed and introduced in 1964 under the guidance of Lee Iacocca (Lehigh Class of 1946), former general manager of Ford Motor Company's Ford Division. Still in production, the Mustang combined fun, performance and styling at a low price and had the most successful first year sales of any automobile. In its first two years of production, three Ford Motor Company plants produced nearly 1.5 million Mustangs, a record unequaled before or since.

=== Golden Gate Bridge ===
Originally designed by Joseph Strauss, the Golden Gate Bridge construction project was carried out by the McClintic-Marshall Construction Co., founded by Howard H. McClintic and Charles D. Marshall, both of the Lehigh Class of 1888. The project was completed in 1937 in San Francisco Bay. Today the bridge is recognized as one of the "Seven Wonders of the Modern World". McClintic-Marshall, (later becoming the Fabricated Steel Construction Division of the Bethlehem Steel Corporation), built numerous other bridges, including Detroit's Ambassador Bridge and New York City's George Washington Bridge. Other construction projects included the Waldorf Astoria Hotel and the Panama Canal.

=== Landing Ship Tank ===
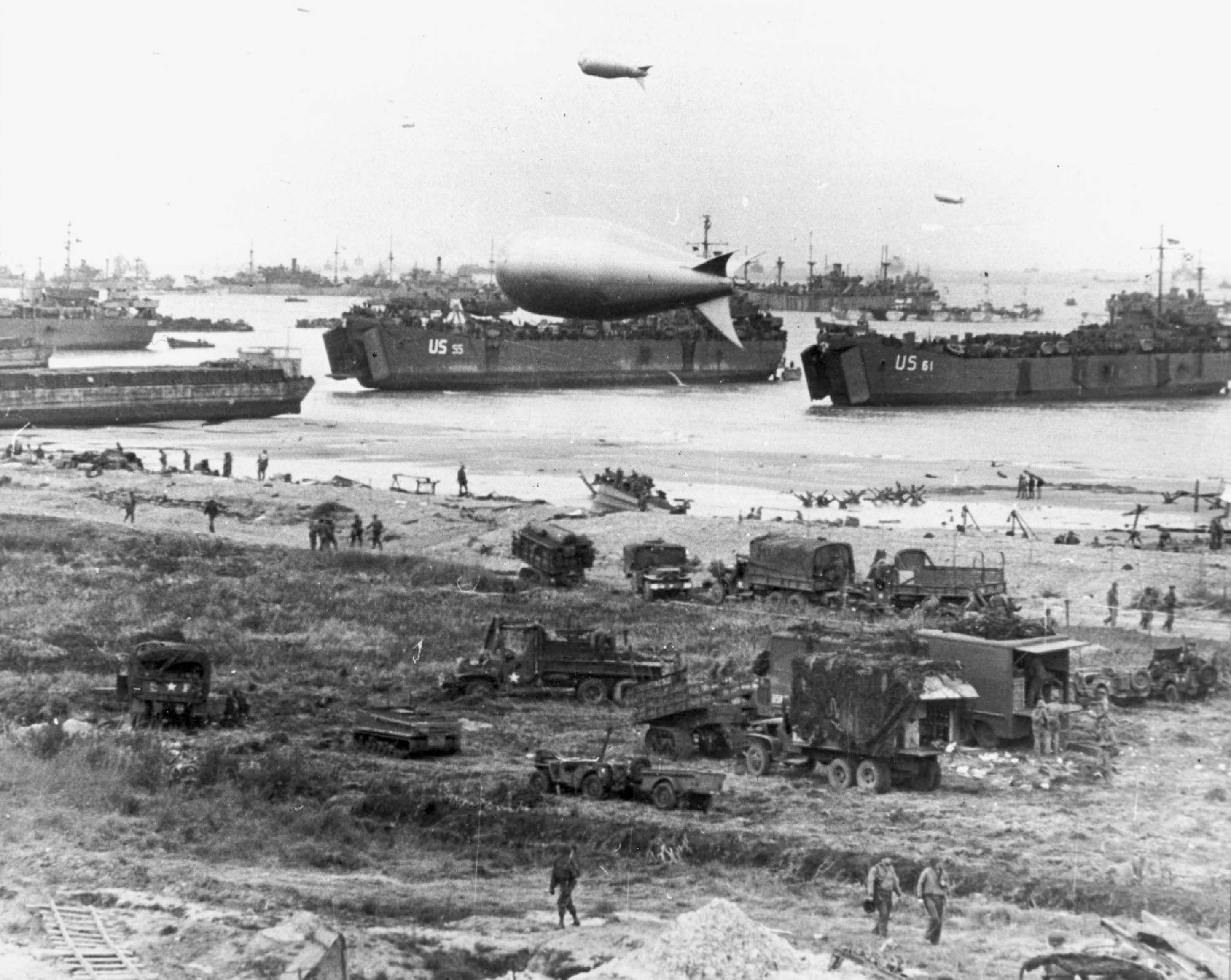
Dravo built LST's on D-Day 6 June 1944

A critical factor for the Allied victory in World War II was the rapid development and production of the Landing Ship Tank (LST). A 328-foot (100 m) cargo ship with an opening bow capable of beaching itself, it enabled armored support of landings without the need to capture a port. This greatly increased the choice of invasion locations and made defense against the landings more difficult. The Dravo Corporation, founded by brothers Francis Dravo (Lehigh Class of 1887) and Ralph Dravo (Lehigh Class of 1889), was the lead yard responsible for the LST shipbuilding program and produced hundreds of them for use in the Allied landings in Normandy and the Pacific. Dravo Brothers also built Destroyer Escorts for the Battle of the Atlantic and many of the tugboats used in American harbors.

=== Packard V-12 engine ===
The Packard V-12, a product of the Packard Motor Company that was co-founded by James Ward Packard (Lehigh Class of 1884), was one of the most powerful inline aircraft engines ever manufactured. The 4M-2500 version produced 1,500 horsepower (1,100 kW) and was essential to the success of US Navy PT Boats in World War II, which were each powered by three of them. James Ward Packard introduced many advances to the internal combustion engine, including the first automatic spark timing advance, allowing an engine to produce more power at higher RPM's and still in use today.

=== P-51 Mustang ===
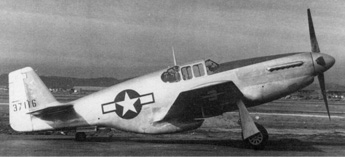
USAAF P-51B Mustang - First version with Packard Merlin engine

One of the most famous fighter aircraft of all time, the P-51 Mustang was the key to gaining air supremacy over Europe in World War II, tripling the kill ratio over Luftwaffe fighters within 3 weeks of its introduction to combat. Initially underpowered with an Allison V-1710 engine, it rapidly achieved dominance when powered by the Packard V-1650 engine made under license from Rolls-Royce. The mass-produced Packard Motor Company (co-founded by James Ward Packard, Lehigh Class of 1884) version of the Merlin was actually found by Rolls-Royce to be superior to its own handmade version, and the Packard version powered most P-51s. Packard also made improvements to increase the maintainability of the engine, which were subsequently adopted by Rolls-Royce in its own versions.

=== Panama Canal ===
Two firms founded by Lehigh graduates were instrumental in the construction of the Panama Canal. The McClintic-Marshall Construction Company constructed the locks and the Dravo Corporation manufactured the enormous lock gates. The gates were uniquely engineered to float and have adjustable buoyancy. This allowed them to be made in the U.S., towed like a barge to Panama, and minimized the force needed to open and close them. The Panama Canal is recognized as one of the "Seven Wonders of the Modern World" .

=== Penske PC-23 Indianapolis Race Car ===
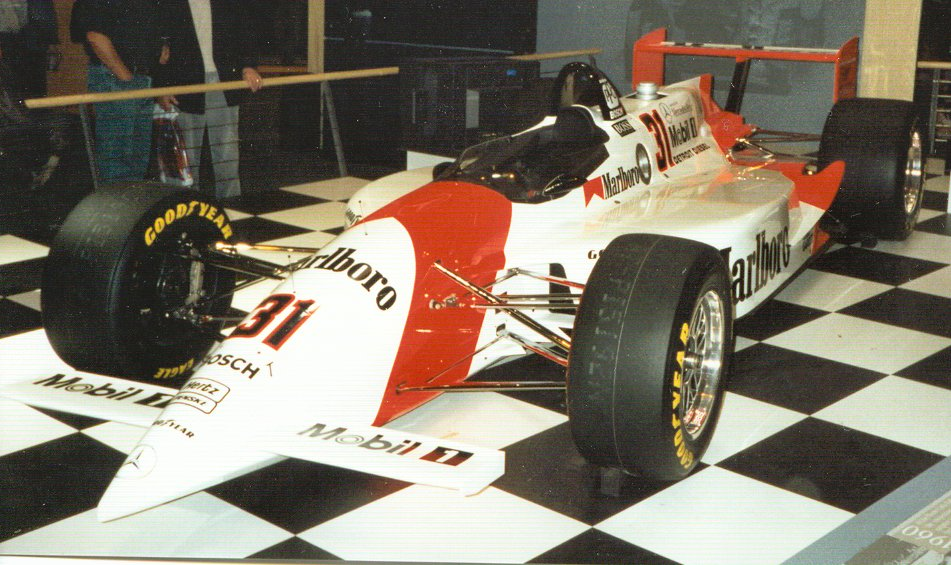
1994 Penske PC-23

The Penske PC-23, developed by Roger Penske, Lehigh Class of 1959, was one of the most dominant open wheel race cars ever developed. In 1994, it won the Indianapolis 500 and 12 out of 16 total races, collecting 10 pole positions and 28 podium finishes on the way to the CART championship. That season saw Penske Racing simultaneously take the Driver's Championship with Al Unser Jr., the Constructor's Cup with the Penske PC-23, and the Manufacturer's Cup with the Ilmor-Mercedes-Benz engine. Competing since 1968, Penske Racing has won 16 Indianapolis 500s, more than any other team.

=== RSA security key factorization ===
Lehigh University is home to Dr. Bruce Dodson, whose significant contributions to cryptography led to the factorization of RSA-140 and RSA-155 on an SGI Origin based supercomputer in 1999. By being able to derive the factors of the encryption keys, it was proven easier to break security schemes based on them. The factorization of RSA-155, a 512-bit key, led to the recommendation that commercial encryption of computer data be based on stronger 1024-bit keys.

=== Tau Beta Pi ===
Tau Beta Pi (ΤΒΠ), the highly regarded national engineering honor society, was formed at Lehigh University in 1885 to recognize the accomplishments of those in the field of engineering. The seal of Tau Beta Pi features brown and white, the colors of Lehigh. Lehigh's chapter was the first established and is known as the Pennsylvania Alpha.
