= Mercedes-Benz 500I engine =

Mercedes-Benz 500I (Ilmor 265-E)
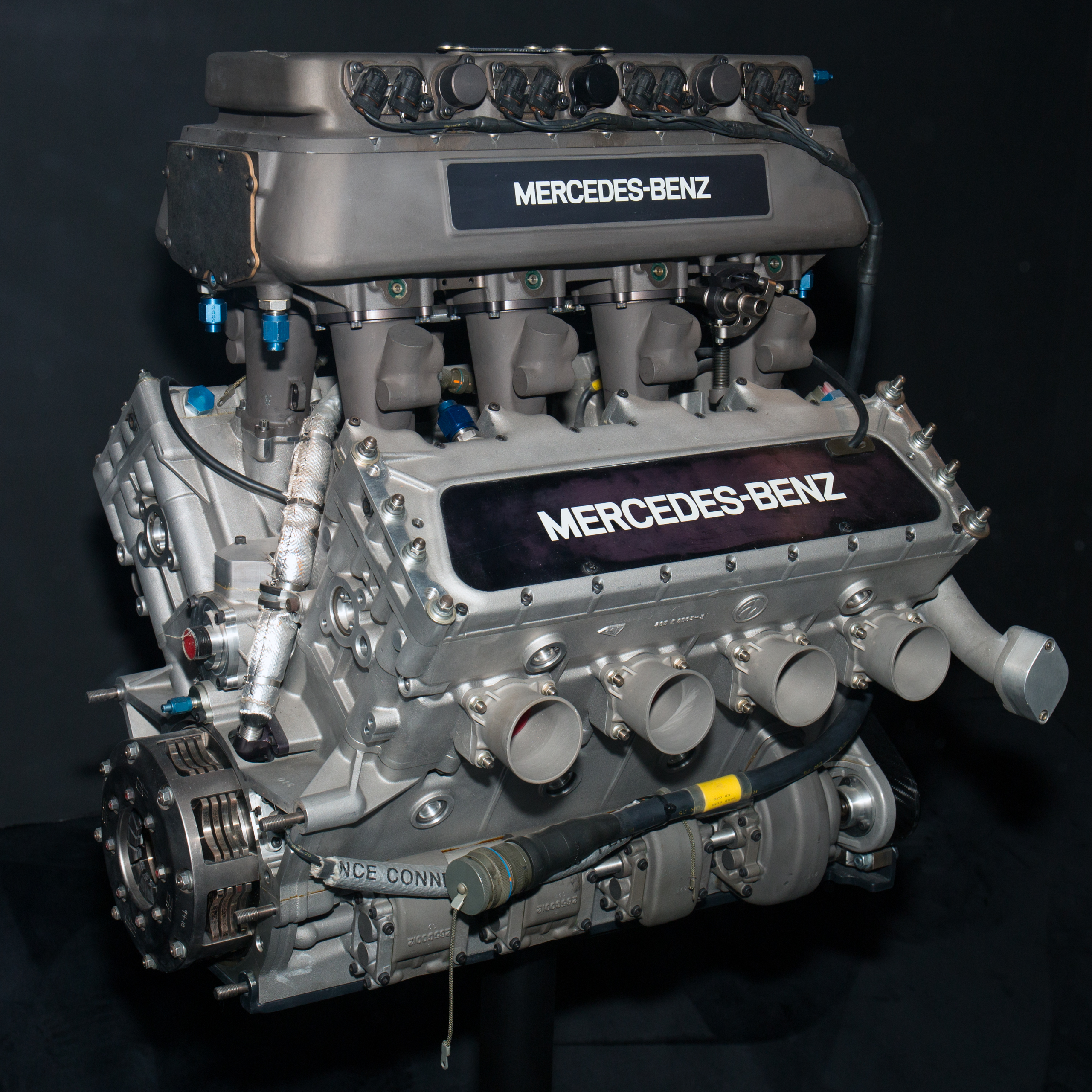

Overview
- Manufacturer: Ilmor-Mercedes
- Production: 1994

Layout
- Configuration: 72° V-8
- Displacement: 3.43 L (209 cu in)
- Cylinder bore: 97 mm (3.8 in)
- Piston stroke: 58 mm (2.3 in)
- Cylinder block material: Aluminum
- Cylinder head material: Aluminum
- Valvetrain: 16-valve, OHV, two-valves per cylinder
- Compression ratio: 11:1

Combustion
- Turbocharger: Garrett
- Fuel system: Electronic fuel injection
- Fuel type: Methanol
- Oil system: Dry sump
- Cooling system: Liquid cooling

Output
- Power output: 1,024 hp (764 kW)
- Torque output: 557 lb⋅ft (755 N⋅m)

Dimensions
- Dry weight: 124–131 kg (273–289 lb)

Chronology
- Successor: Mercedes-Benz IC108 engine (1995)

The Mercedes-Benz 500I engine is a highly powerful, turbocharged, 3.4-liter, Indy car racing V-8 engine, designed, developed, and built by Ilmor, in partnership with Mercedes-Benz, specifically to compete in the 1994 Indianapolis 500.

The Mercedes-Benz 500I engine was slightly lighter than the Ilmor 265D Indy V8 it replaced in the Penske PC-23, although because of its longer inlets, the 500I had a higher overall centre of gravity, thus changing the overall balance of the car a bit. The development and testing of the 500I engine, at that time called Ilmor 265E, took place in the utmost secrecy because there was a possibility of the turbocharger boost level being changed, or the engine being banned by the Indy 500 sanctioning body.

== Background ==
=== Mercedes-Benz 500I ===
Much to the surprise of competitors, media, and fans, Marlboro Team Penske arrived at the Indianapolis Motor Speedway with a brand new, secretly-built 209 cid Mercedes-Benz pushrod engine, which was capable of a reported 1000 horsepower. Despite reliability issues with the engine and handling difficulties with the chassis, the three-car Penske team (Unser, Emerson Fittipaldi and Paul Tracy) dominated most of the month, and nearly the entire race. This engine used a provision in the rules intended for stock block pushrod engines such as the V-6 Buick engines that allowed an extra 650 cm³ and 10 inches (4.9 psi/33.8 kPa) of boost. This extra power (1,024 horsepower, which was up a 150-200 hp advantage over the conventional V-8s.) allowed the Penskes to run significantly faster, giving them the pole and outside front row on the grid for the 78th Indianapolis 500. Al Unser Jr. and Emerson Fittipaldi dominated the race, eventually lapping the field with 16 laps to go in the 200 lap race when Emerson made contact with a wall coming out of Turn 4, giving Al Unser Jr. the lead and win. The only other driver who finished on the lead lap was rookie Jacques Villeneuve.

In the summer and fall of 1993, Ilmor and Penske engaged in a new engine program. Under complete secrecy, a 209-CID purpose-built, pushrod engine was being developed. Mercedes stepped in near the end of development and paid a fee in order to badge the engine as the Mercedes-Benz 500I. The engine was designed to exploit a perceived "loophole" that existed in USAC's rulebook since 1991. While CART sanctioned the rest of the Indycar season, the Indianapolis 500 itself was conducted by USAC under slightly different rules.

In an effort to appeal to smaller engine-building companies, USAC had permitted "stock-block" pushrod engines (generally defined as single non-OHC units fitted with two valves per cylinder actuated by pushrod and rocker arm). The traditional "stock blocks," saw some limited use in the early 1980s, but became mainstream at Indy starting with the introduction of the Buick V-6 Indy engine. Initially, the stock blocks were required to have some production-based parts. However, in 1991, USAC quietly lifted the requirement, and purpose-built pushrod engines were permitted to be designed for racing at the onset. Attempting to create an equivalency formula, both pushrod engine formats were allowed increased displacement (209.3 cid vs. 161.7), and increased turbocharger boost (55 inHG vs. 45 inHG)

Team Penske mated the engine with the in-house Penske chassis, the PC-23. It was introduced to the public in April, just days before opening day at Indy.

== Applications ==
- Penske PC-23

== Bibliography ==
- Gurss, Jade (1 April 2020). Beast: The Top Secret Ilmor-Penske Race Car That Shocked the World at the 1994 Indy 500 (Revised 2nd ed.). Octane Press. ISBN 978-1642340105.
