= Penske PC-23 =

CART racing car

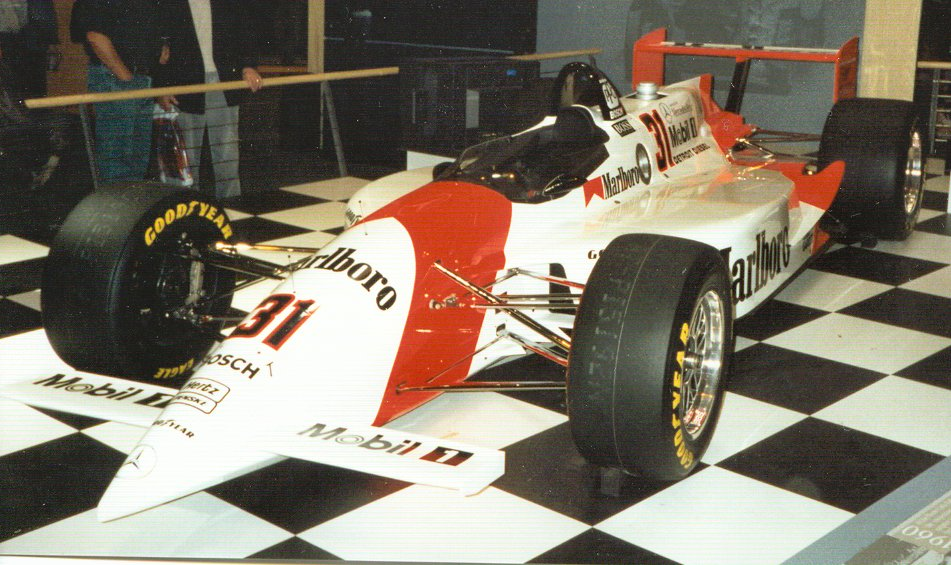
- Category: CART IndyCar
- Constructor: Penske Cars Ltd
- Designer: Nigel Bennett
- Predecessor: Penske PC-22
- Successor: Penske PC-24

Technical specifications
- Chassis: Carbon-fiber monocoque
- Suspension (front): Pushrod
- Suspension (rear): Pushrod
- Length: 190 in (4,826 mm)
- Wheelbase: 115 in (2,921 mm)
- Engine: Ilmor Indy V-8; Mercedes-Benz 500I (for Indy 500 only); Ilmor Indy V8: 2.65 L (2,650 cc; 162 cu in); 500I:3.43 L (3,430 cc; 209 cu in); Ilmor Indy V8: V-8, vee angle 72 degrees, 4 valves per cylinder, DOHC; 500I: V-8, vee angle 72 degrees, 2 valves per cylinder, pushrod system single-turbocharged Mid-engined, longitudinally-mounted
- Transmission: 6-speed manual
- Power: 500I: 1,024 hp @ 9,800 rpm (10,500 rpm max.), 550 lb⋅ft (746 N⋅m) torque
- Weight: 1,550 lb (703 kg)
- Fuel: Mobil and 76 methanol
- Lubricants: Mobil 1
- Tires: Goodyear Eagle Speedway Special Radial 25.5in x 9.5in x 15in (front); 27in x 14.5in x 15in (rear)

Competition history
- Notable entrants: Penske Racing
- Notable drivers: 2 Emerson Fittipaldi; 3 Paul Tracy; 31 Al Unser Jr.
- Debut: 1994 Australian FAI Indycar Grand Prix; Surfers Paradise, Australia
Races	Wins	Poles
32	12	10
- Constructors' Championships: 1 (CART)
- Drivers' Championships: 1 (CART)

The Penske PC-23 was a highly successful CART racing car that competed in the 1994 IndyCar season with Penske Racing, and in the 1995 IndyCar season with Bettenhausen Motorsports. It was designed by Nigel Bennett, who based its design on the 1993 car, the PC-22, which was a radical departure from the basic concept of the previous Penske cars. The PC-23 was one of the most dominant open-wheel race cars ever developed. It won both the 1994 CART season, and the 1994 Indianapolis 500 with Al Unser Jr., together with Emerson Fittipaldi and Paul Tracy scoring 12 wins out of 16 in total, collecting 10 pole positions and 28 podium finishes, in a season that saw Penske also take the Constructor's Cup, and the Manufacturer's Cup with the Ilmor-Mercedes-Benz engine. Nevertheless, the car is mostly known for the controversial pushrod Mercedes-Benz 500I engine, designed and developed for the single race of Indianapolis, exploiting a loophole in different technical rules between the Indy 500 (which was then sanctioned by USAC) and CART sanctioning bodies at that time.

== Overview ==
The PC-23 was a design evolution of its predecessor, the PC-22, which won the 1993 Indianapolis 500, eight races over the entire season, and missing the 1993 CART title by only eight points. The only substantial difference of the new car from it were the smaller rear wings on the short ovals, mandatory by rule changes for the 1994 season, and Team Penske put in a lot of test efforts to minimize the effects of these changes. There were also some modifications on the transmission, but the new car was mostly a progression. Plans to fit the PC-23 with an active suspension system were cancelled due to a ban by CART on such technology. The car and the Ilmor engine were ready for testing by mid-December 1993.

The Indy 500 version of the PC-23, showed a much higher engine cover, required because of the new engine. Other modifications included changes to the input gears of the gearbox, to cope with the lower rpm and higher power and torque the pushrod engine provided. However, the two versions of the gearbox were of the same weight, thus causing no shift in the weight balance. The Mercedes-Benz 500I engine was slightly lighter than the Ilmor Indy V-8, although because of its longer inlets the center of gravity of the entire engine was higher than that of the 500I, thus changing the overall balance of the car a bit. The development and testing of the 500I engine, at that time called Ilmor 265E, took place in the utmost secrecy because there was a possibility of the turbocharger boost level being changed, or the engine being banned by the Indy 500 sanctioning body.

== Racing history ==
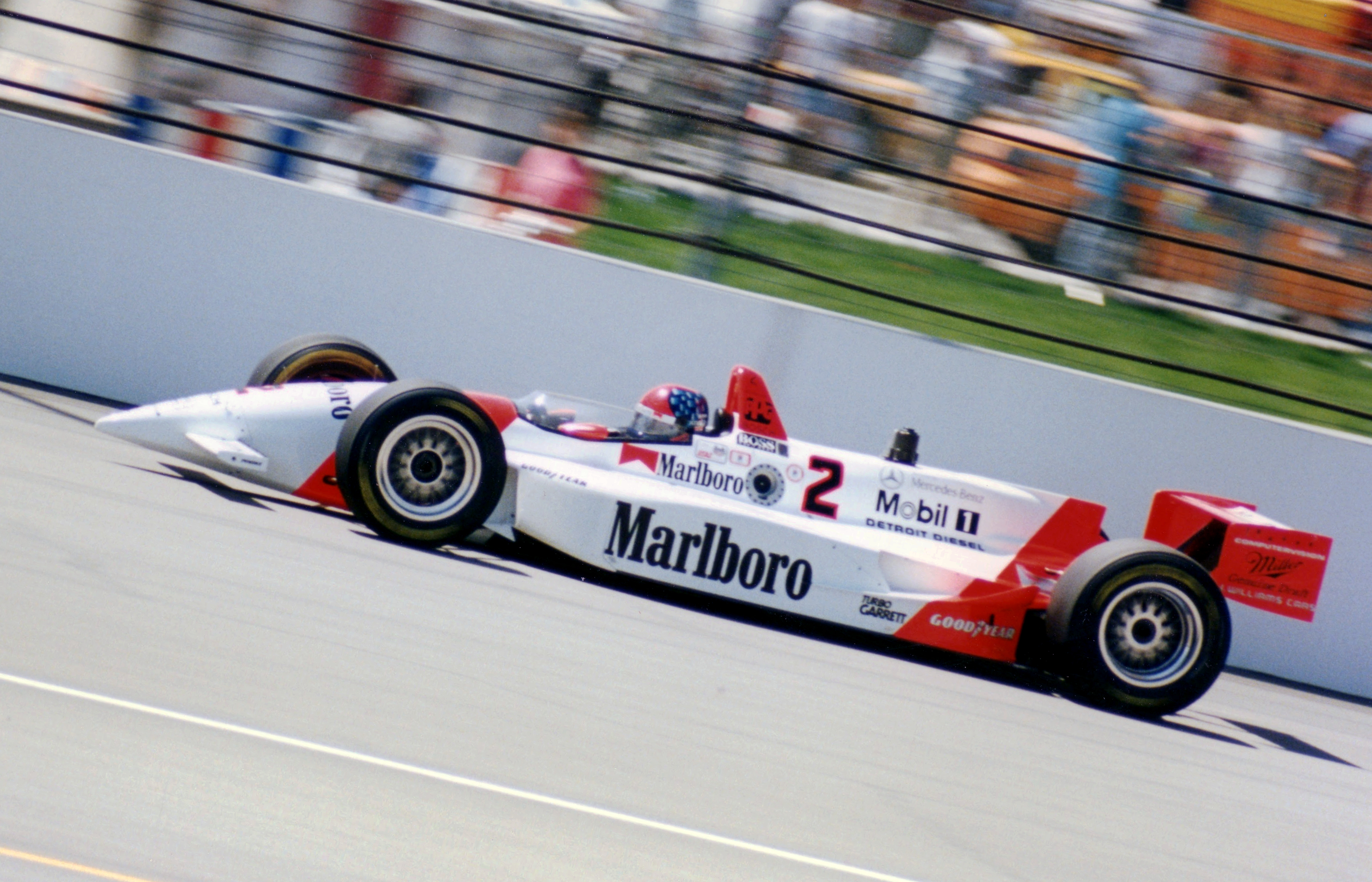
Emerson Fittipaldi driving the PC-23 at the 1994 Indianapolis 500

The PC23 debuted at 1994 Australian FAI Indycar Grand Prix, noted for the sensational debut win of Reynard chassis, qualifying third with Fittipaldi, fifth with Al Unser Jr., and sixth with Tracy. In the race, which was shortened by 10 laps due to darkness, Fittipaldi scored a second place, while Unser and Tracy retired for electrical problems. At Phoenix, the first oval race of the season, the PC23 scored its first win, with Fittipaldi ahead of Al Unser Jr. The season continued with six wins in a row, three for Unser: Long Beach, Indianapolis and Milwaukee, where Penske Racing scored a remarkable 1-2-3 win with Fittipaldi second and Tracy third, a win for Tracy at Detroit, and two wins for Unser at Portland, another 1-2-3 sweep for Penske, and Cleveland. In Toronto however, Unser's engine blew, while Fittipaldi finished third, and Tracy fifth, ending an astonishing streak of seven wins in a row. In Michigan, the entire Penske pack retired, but for the next two races, Mid-Ohio and New Hampshire, the Penskes scored two 1-2-3 wins in a row, with Unser as the winner on both occasions. Unser won also in Vancouver, completing his second row of three back to back wins of the season. The Road America race was won by then-rising star Jacques Villeneuve, his first in CART racing, while Unser clinched the championship ahead of Fittipaldi. Two final events of the season, Nazareth and Laguna Seca were won by Paul Tracy. Unser, Fittipaldi, and Tracy ended the season at first three places in season standings respectively.

In the 1995, not counting the brief and unfortunate attempt to qualify at Indy 500 with their year-old car, Penske Racing was running with the new PC-24, although with much less success. However, the Bettenhausen Motorsports team used the PC-23 for almost the entire season, with the Indy 500 and Milwaukee as sole exceptions. Bettenhausen driver Stefan Johansson scored points in eight races and finished 13th place in the final standings, with on third place as its best result. In 1996, the PC-23 had one final run, at the inaugural U.S. 500 with Gary Bettenhausen, who crashed out of the race in lap 89, while in the 21st place.

=== Mercedes-Benz 500I ===
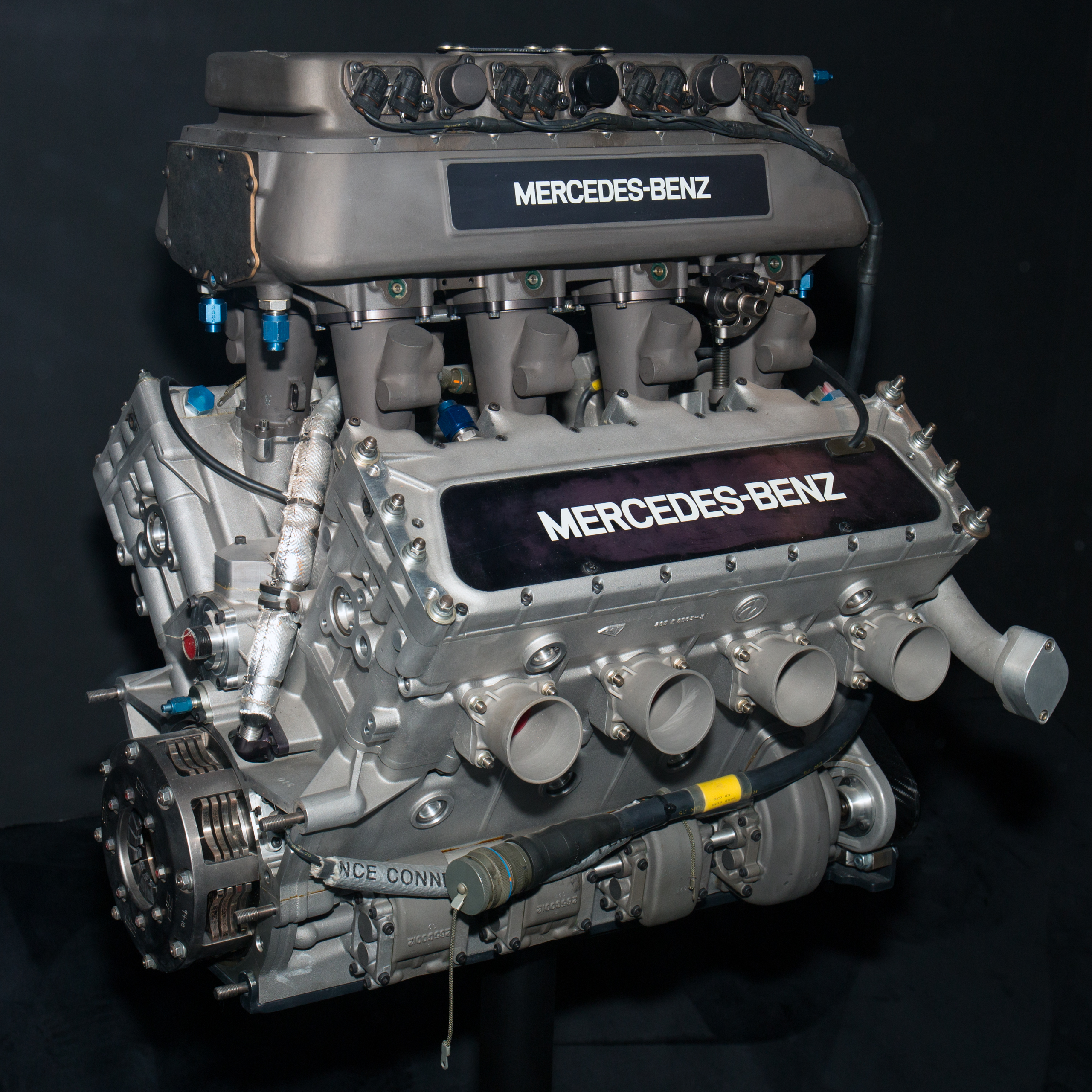
Mercedes-Benz 500I engine displayed in the Mercedes-Benz Museum.

Much to the surprise of competitors, media, and fans, Marlboro Team Penske arrived at the Indianapolis Motor Speedway with a brand new, secretly-built 209-cubic-inch (3,420 cc) Mercedes-Benz pushrod engine, which was capable of a reported 1,000 horsepower (750 kW). Despite reliability issues with the engine and handling difficulties with the chassis, the three-car Penske team (Unser, Emerson Fittipaldi and Paul Tracy) dominated most of the month, and nearly the entire race. This engine used a provision in the rules intended for stock block pushrod engines such as the V6 Buick engines that allowed an extra 650 cubic centimetres (40 cu in) of displacement and 10 inches (4.9 psi/33.8 kPa) of boost. This extra power (1,024 horsepower, which was up a 150-200 hp advantage over the conventional V-8s) allowed the Penskes to run significantly faster, giving them the pole and outside front row on the grid for the 78th Indianapolis 500. Al Unser Jr. and Emerson Fittipaldi dominated the race, eventually lapping the field with 16 laps to go in the 200 lap race when Emerson made contact with a wall coming out of Turn 4, giving Al Unser Jr. the lead and win. The only other driver who finished on the lead lap was rookie Jacques Villeneuve.

In the summer and fall of 1993, Ilmor and Penske engaged in a new engine program. Under complete secrecy, a 209 cid purpose-built, pushrod engine was being developed. Mercedes stepped in near the end of development and paid a fee in order to badge the engine as the Mercedes-Benz 500I. The engine was designed to exploit a perceived "loophole" that existed in USAC's rulebook since 1991. While CART sanctioned the rest of the Indycar season, the Indianapolis 500 itself was conducted by USAC under slightly different rules.

In an effort to appeal to smaller engine-building companies, USAC had permitted "stock-block" pushrod engines (generally defined as single non-OHC units fitted with two valves per cylinder actuated by pushrod and rocker arm). The traditional "stock blocks," saw some limited use in the early 1980s, but became mainstream at Indy starting with the introduction of the Buick V-6 Indy engine. Initially, the stock blocks were required to have some production-based parts. However, in 1991, USAC quietly lifted the requirement, and purpose-built pushrod engines were permitted to be designed for racing at the onset. Attempting to create an equivalency formula, both pushrod engine formats were allowed increased displacement (209.3 cid vs. 161.7), and increased turbocharger boost (55 inHG vs. 45 inHG)

Team Penske mated the engine with the in-house Penske chassis, the PC-23. It was introduced to the public in April, just days before opening day at Indy.

== Legacy ==
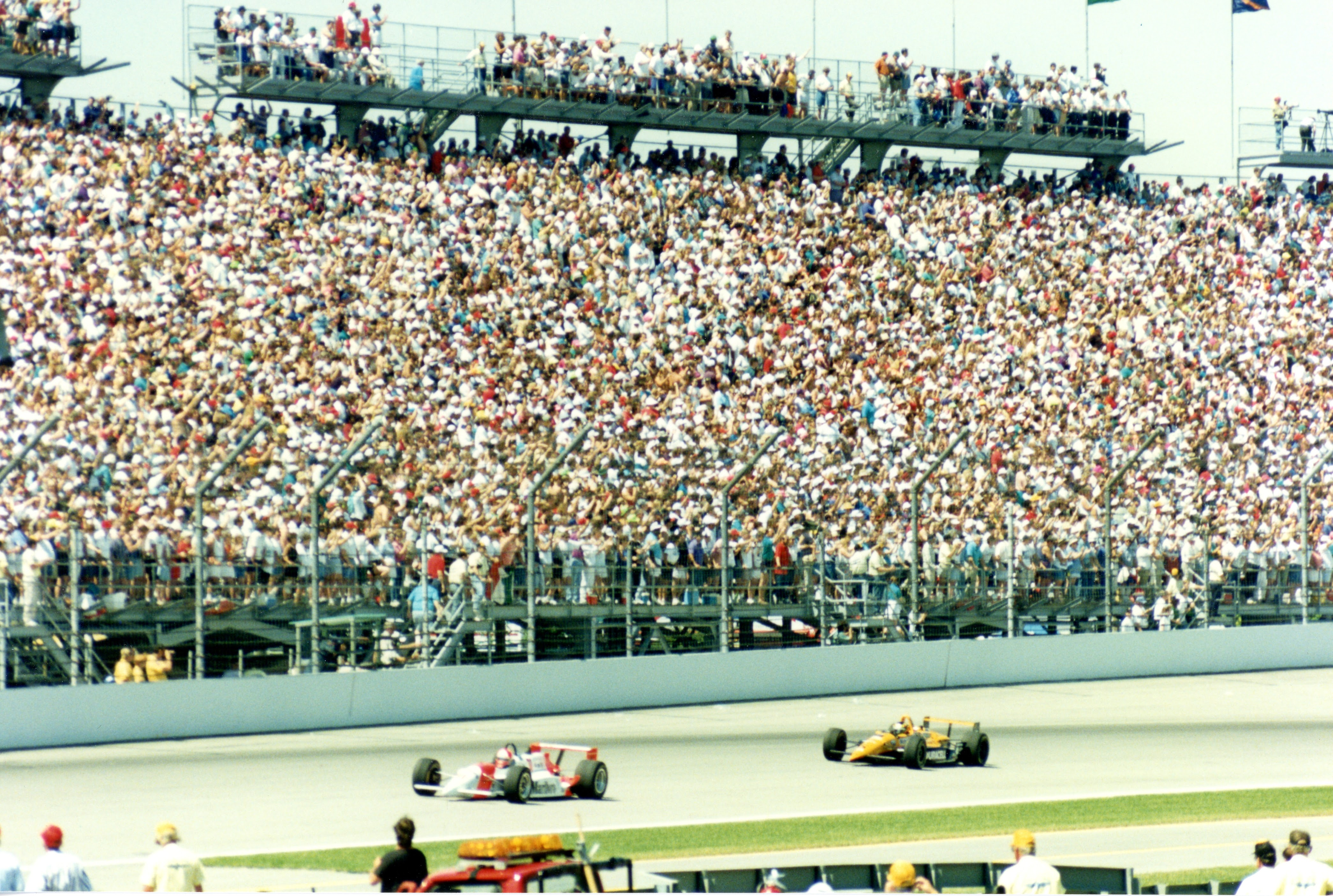
The Penske PC-23 at the 1994 Indianapolis 500

The car in its Indy 500 version caused a considerable uproar at the Indianapolis Motor Speedway and in the racing world in general. Subsequently, the PC-23 was recognized as one of the triggers of the CART/IRL split,.

In 2014, author Jade Gurss published a book detailing the efforts to create the PC-23. Called Beast, the book explored what happened in the year leading up to the 1994 Indy-500.

== Complete Indy Car World Series results ==
(key) (Results in bold indicate pole position; results in italics indicate fastest lap)

Year	Entrant	Engine	Tires	Driver	No.	1	2	3	4	5	6	7	8	9	10	11	12	13	14	15	16	17	Points	D.C.
1994	Marlboro Team Penske	Ilmor 265D V-8-turbo; Mercedes-Benz 500I V-8-turbo	G			SFR	PHX	LBH	INDY	MIL	DET	POR	CLE	TOR	MCH	MDO	NHA	VAN	ROA	NAZ	LAG			
1994	Marlboro Team Penske	Ilmor 265D V-8-turbo; Mercedes-Benz 500I V-8-turbo	G	(Brazil) Emerson Fittipaldi	2	2	1	21	17	2	2	2	20	3	10	3	**3**	9	3	**3**	4		**178**	**2nd**
1994	Marlboro Team Penske	Ilmor 265D V-8-turbo; Mercedes-Benz 500I V-8-turbo	G	(Canada) Paul Tracy	3	16	**23**	**20**	23	3	1	3	3	5	16	2	2	20	**18**	1	**1**		**152**	**3rd**
1994	Marlboro Team Penske	Ilmor 265D V-8-turbo; Mercedes-Benz 500I V-8-turbo	G	(United States) Al Unser Jr.	31	14	2	1	**1**	1	10	**1**	**1**	29	8	**1**	1	1	2	2	20		**225**	**1st**
1995	Bettenhausen Motorsports	Mercedes-Benz IC108B V8t	G			MIA	SFR	PHX	LBH	NAZ	INDY	MIL	DET	POR	ROA	TOR	CLE	MCH	MDO	NHA	VAN	LAG		
1995	Bettenhausen Motorsports	Mercedes-Benz IC108B V8t	G	(Sweden) Stefan Johansson	16	22	17	24	6	3	DNQ^{1}	21	11	6	10	14	8	6	23	25	4	14	**60**	**13th**
1995	Marlboro Team Penske	Mercedes-Benz IC108B V8t	G	(Brazil) Emerson Fittipaldi ^{2}	89						DNQ												^{2}	NC ^{2}
1996	Bettenhausen Racing	Mercedes-Benz IC108B V8t	G			MIA	RIO	SFR	LBH	NAZ	500	MIL	DET	POR	CLE	TOR	MCH	MDO	ROA	VAN	LAG			
1996	Bettenhausen Racing	Mercedes-Benz IC108B V8t	G	(United States) Gary Bettenhausen	26						21												**0**	**39th**

^{1} Johansson did qualify a Reynard 94I - Ford XB V8t.
^{2} Only the #89 car results are counted. Fittipaldi run entire season with the PC-24 chassis, scoring 67 points and 11th final place.

=== Chassis Constructors ===
Chassis	Top Team	Top Driver	SFR	PHX	LBH	INDY	MIL	DET	POR	CLE	TOR	MCH	MDO	NHA	VAN	ROA	NAZ	LAG	Points	Rk
(United States) Penske PC-23; Penske PC-22	Marlboro Team Penske	(United States) Al Unser Jr.	2	1	1	**1**	1	1	**1**	**1**	3	8	**1**	1	1	2	1	**1**	**313**	**1**
