= 1994 Indianapolis 500 =

American motor race

78th Indianapolis 500
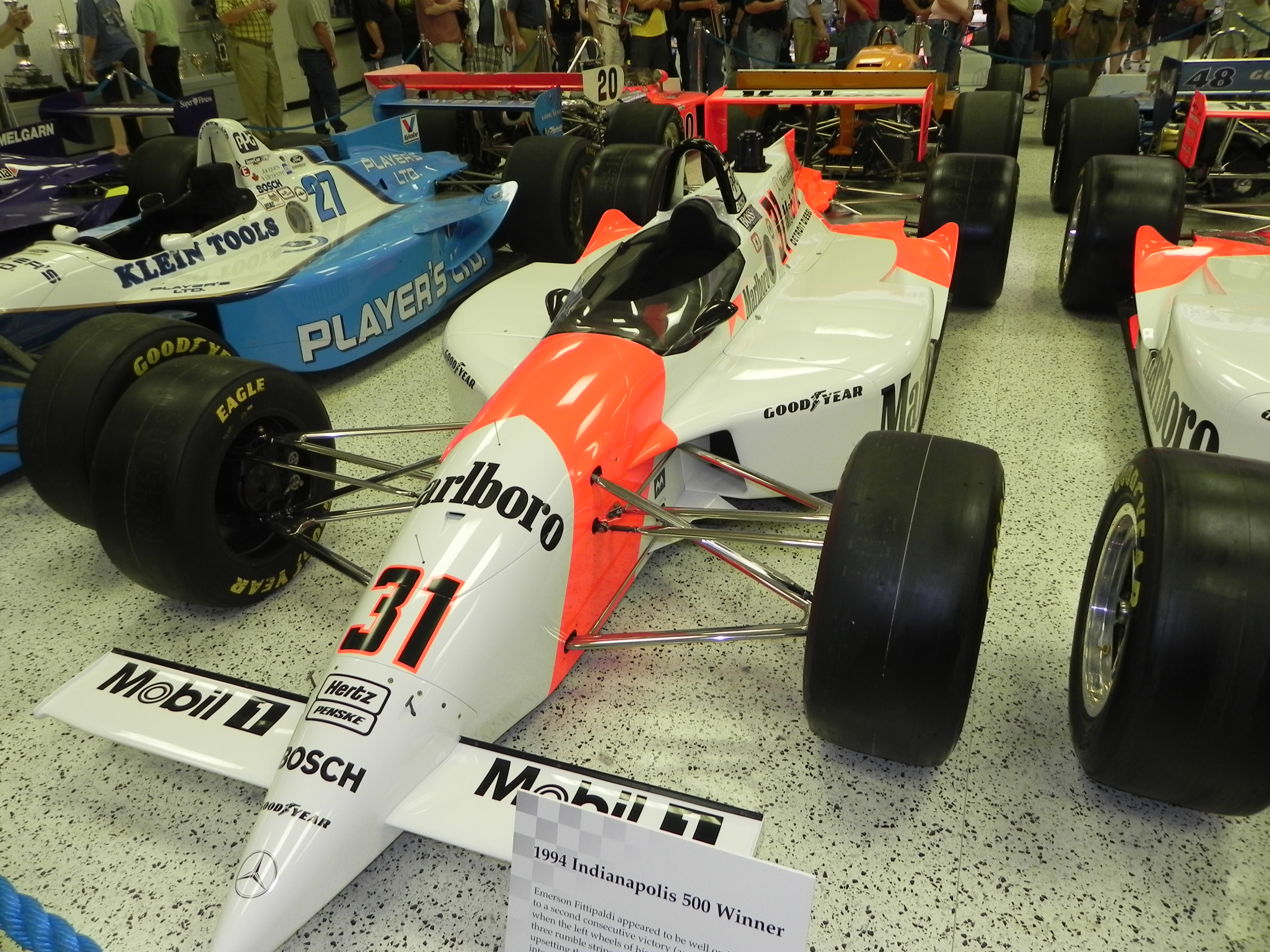

Indianapolis Motor Speedway

Indianapolis 500
- Sanctioning body: USAC
- Season: 1994 CART season
- Date: May 29, 1994
- Winner: (United States) Al Unser Jr.
- Winning team: Penske Racing
- Winning Chief Mechanic: Richard Buck & Clive Howell
- Time of race: 3:06:29.006
- Average speed: 160.872 mph (258.898 km/h)
- Pole position: (United States) Al Unser Jr.
- Pole speed: 228.011 mph (366.948 km/h)
- Fastest qualifier: (United States) Al Unser Jr.
- Rookie of the Year: (Canada) Jacques Villeneuve
- Most laps led: (Brazil) Emerson Fittipaldi (145)

Pre-race ceremonies
- National anthem: Florence Henderson
- "Back Home Again in Indiana": Jim Nabors
- Starting command: Mary F. Hulman
- Pace car: Ford Mustang Cobra
- Pace car driver: Parnelli Jones
- Starter: Duane Sweeney
- Estimated attendance: 400,000

Television in the United States
- Network: ABC
- Announcers: Host/Lap-by-lap: Paul Page; Color Analyst: Sam Posey; Color Analyst/Turn 2: Bobby Unser; Color Analyst/Turn 4: Danny Sullivan
- Nielsen ratings: 9.1 / 31

Chronology
Previous	Next
1993	1995

The 78th Indianapolis 500 was held at the Indianapolis Motor Speedway in Speedway, Indiana on Sunday, May 29, 1994. The race was sanctioned by USAC, and was race 4 of 16 of the 1994 PPG IndyCar World Series. Al Unser Jr. won the race from the pole position, his second of two Indy 500 victories (1992, 1994).

Much to the surprise of competitors, media, and fans, Marlboro Team Penske arrived at the Speedway with a brand new, secretly-built 209 in^{3} (3.42 L) displacement Ilmor Mercedes-Benz pushrod engine, which was capable of nearly 1,000 horsepower (750 kW). Despite reliability issues with the engine and handling difficulties with the chassis, the three-car Penske team (Al Unser Jr., Emerson Fittipaldi and Paul Tracy) dominated most of the month, and practically the entire race. It marked the second of two Indy 500 victories (as of 2026) by a Mercedes-Benz engine.

Though Al Unser Jr. won the pole position, two-time former winner (1989, 1993) Emerson Fittipaldi dominated most of the race. Fittipaldi led 145 laps (of 200), and at one point, had lapped the entire field. Fittipaldi was seeking his third Indy win and was also attempting to become the first back-to-back winner at Indy since Al Unser Sr. in 1970–1971. On lap 185, Fittipaldi was leading the race, and was jockeying with teammate Al Unser Jr. (who was running second). Fittipaldi was trying to put Unser a lap down before he headed to the pits for a last-minute splash of fuel. Fittipaldi tagged the wall in turn 4, which handed the lead to Unser with 15 laps to go. Unser was able to stretch his fuel and cruise to victory over rookie Jacques Villeneuve. Al Unser Jr. joined his father Al Sr. and uncle Bobby as winners of multiple 500s at Indianapolis.

The race marked the final Indy 500 for both Fittipaldi and Mario Andretti (who retired at the end of the 1994 season). Fittipaldi would fail to qualify for the 1995 race, then was part of CART's boycott of the 1996 race. Two months later, he suffered career-ending injuries in a crash at Michigan, and subsequently retired. In addition, Indy veterans Al Unser Sr. and Johnny Rutherford both announced their retirements in the days leading up to the race. John Andretti, who had left CART and moved to the NASCAR Winston Cup Series, became the first driver to race in both the Indy 500 and Coca-Cola 600 on the same day, an effort that has become known as "Double Duty". This was also the second and final Indy 500 for Nigel Mansell, who was knocked out of the race in a bizarre crash with Dennis Vitolo.

For the second year in a row, weather was not a factor during the month. Only one practice day was lost to rain, and pole day was only partially halted due to scattered showers. Warm, sunny skies greeted race day.

== Background ==
Nigel Mansell went on to win the 1993 CART championship, with 1993 Indy 500 winner Emerson Fittipaldi finishing second in points. Mansell returned to team up again with Mario Andretti at Newman Haas. Andretti embarked on a yearlong Arrivederci Mario tour, announcing he would retire at the conclusion of the 1994 CART season. The 1994 race would be his 29th and final start at Indy. Fittipaldi remained at Penske Racing, which expanded to a three-car effort for 1994, including Al Unser Jr. and Paul Tracy. Unser parted ways with Galles after a six-year stint, and was replaced there with rookie Adrián Fernández.

After a dismal season in Formula One, Michael Andretti returned to Indy car racing for 1994, signing with Ganassi. Andretti won the season opening Australian Grand Prix at Surfers Paradise. It was the first Indy car win for Ganassi, as well as the first win for the Reynard chassis (in its Indy car debut). Rahal-Hogan Racing, with drivers Bobby Rahal and Mike Groff, debuted the first Honda Indy car engine, the iron block Honda HRX Indy V-8.

Chevrolet dropped its support of the Ilmor engine program at Indy after 1993. For 1994, the 265C, the 265 C+, and 265D V-8 powerplants were badged the "Ilmor Indy V8".

After Michael Andretti won the season opener, Marlboro Team Penske won the next two races before Indy. Emerson Fittipaldi and Al Unser Jr. finished 1–2 at Phoenix, then Al Unser Jr. won at Long Beach.

Jim Nabors returned to sing the traditional "Back Home Again in Indiana" just months after receiving a liver transplant. Nabors had suffered a near-fatal case of Hepatitis B, which caused liver failure. Initially it was not expected that he would be able to attend the race in person.

Six days before opening day, the worldwide motorsports community was shaken by the death of Ayrton Senna at San Marino. Indy drivers Emerson Fittipaldi, Raul Boesel, and Maurício Gugelmin, were among those in attendance at the funeral, all three serving as pall-bearers.

=== Mercedes-Benz 500I ===
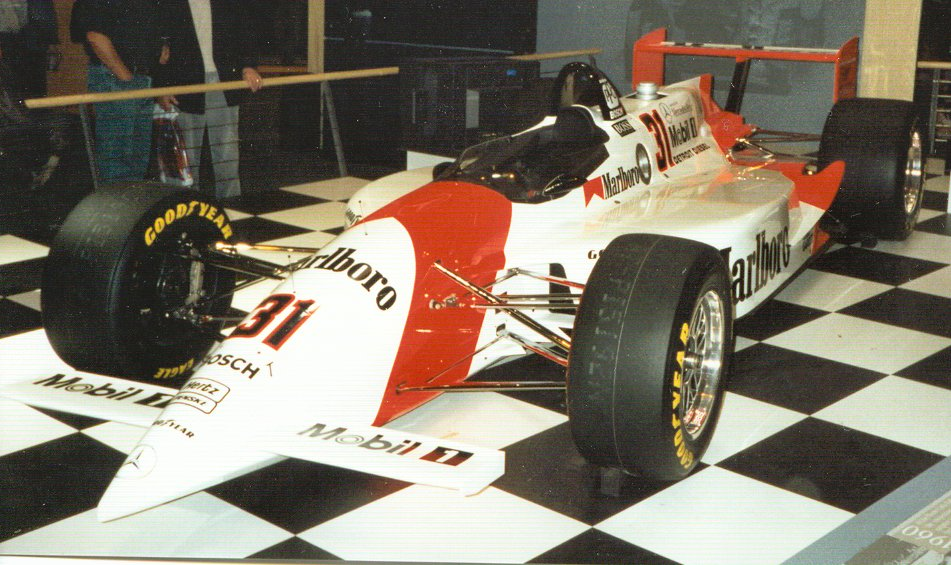
1994 Penske PC-23 Mercedes-Benz 500I

The most notable off-season activity involved Penske Racing and Ilmor. In the summer and fall of 1993, Penske and Ilmor engaged in a new engine project. Under complete secrecy, a 209 in^{3} (3.42 L) purpose-built, V-8 pushrod engine was developed. Mercedes eventually came on board with the project and badged the engine the Mercedes-Benz 500I. The engine was designed to exploit a perceived loophole that had existed in USAC's rulebook since 1991. While CART sanctioned the rest of the IndyCar season, the Indianapolis 500 alone was conducted by USAC under slightly different technical regulations.

In an effort to appeal to mainstream car companies and smaller independent engine builders (both primarily based in the U.S.), USAC permitted traditional, "stock block" pushrod engines (generally defined as production-based, non-overhead cam units fitted with two valves per cylinder actuated by pushrod and rocker arm). Stock blocks saw some limited use at Indy in the early 1980s but by 1985 had become mainstream with the Turbo Buick V-6. Attempting to create an equivalency formula with the more conventional, 32-valve, dual overhead cam V-8 engines (commonly referred to as the "quadcams"), USAC allowed the stock blocks increased displacement, as well as increased turbocharger boost of 55 inHG instead of 45 (1860 hPa instead of 1520). This rule made the Buick V-6 (and its successor the Menard V-6) attractive to the smaller, "Indy-only" teams, that could not acquire or afford the DOHC V-8 powerplants such as the Chevy-Ilmor or the Ford-Cosworth XB. CART also allowed the "stock block" engines. However, they did not permit them to use the increased turbo boost, rendering them uncompetitive. Thus the Buick V-6 was rarely used in CART races, although a detuned version was used in Indy Lights for several years.

Initially, stock blocks at Indy were required to have some factory production-based parts. For instance, the aforementioned Buick was based on the Buick V-6 passenger car engine. However, in 1991 USAC quietly lifted this requirement allowing purpose-built pushrod engines to be designed for racing from the ground up. USAC allowed these pushrod engines an increased displacement of 209.3 cubic inches (3.430 L) instead of 161.7 cubic inches (2.650 L), and the same increased turbocharger boost of 55 inHG allowed to the V-6 stock blocks. Privateer Greenfield Racing built one of the first "209" pushrod engines to these new specifications. However, that engine never got up to speed during practice, and never made a qualifying attempt.

Team Penske and Ilmor designed, built, and tested their pushrod engine in complete secrecy during the fall of 1993 and into the spring of 1994. The team went so far as plowing several feet of snow off of Nazareth Speedway (a track which was owned by Penske at the time) for a private test. The team was in such desperate need of on-track reliability testing, they conducted the session despite frigid temperatures, tall snow banks on the sides of the track, and the engine sounds in the earshot of rival Mario and Michael Andretti's homes.

Before Mercedes-Benz joined the effort, the engine was initially called the "Ilmor 265-E" which followed Ilmor's standard naming convention for their previous DOHC racing engines. This was ostensibly to maintain in-house secrecy of the pushrod project from those employed at Penske and at Ilmor who were not apprised or involved. Some plans and specification sheets send to parts manufacturers were even labeled "Pontiac" - an attempt to divert suspicion by third-party parts manufacturers by implying that the orders were for Penske South Racing, their NASCAR unit. During testing, driver Emerson Fittipaldi, so impressed by its raw power, nicknamed the engine the "Beast", a moniker which became synonymous with the engine. The 500I was mated with the race-winning Penske chassis, the PC-23. It was introduced to the public in April, just days before opening day at Indy. Rumors quickly began to circulate that the engine, more refined than the Buick V-6 and having two more cylinders, was capable of over 1,000 hp (750 kW), which was a 150-200 hp advantage over its competition.

=== Track improvements ===
During the off-season, the pit area was repaved. The individual pit boxes were changed to concrete, while the entrance and exit lanes were widened and repaved in asphalt.

A new scoring pylon was erected on the main stretch, replacing the landmark originally built in 1959.

== Race schedule ==
Race schedule – April/May 1994
Sun	Mon	Tue	Wed	Thu	Fri	Sat
24	25	26	27	28	29; ROP	30; ROP
1 ROP	2	3	4	5	6 Mini-Marathon	7 Practice
8 Practice	9 Practice	10; Practice	11; Practice	12; Practice	13; Practice	14; Time Trials
15; Time Trials	16; Practice	17; Practice	18; Practice	19; Practice	20; Practice	21; Time Trials
22; Bump Day	23	24	25	26; Carb Day	27	28; Parade
29; Indy 500	30; Memorial Day	31				

Color	Notes
Green	Practice
Dark Blue	Time trials
Silver	Race day
Red	Rained out*
Blank	No track activity

* Includes days where track
activity was significantly
limited due to rain

ROP — denotes Rookie
Orientation Program

== Practice – Week 1 ==
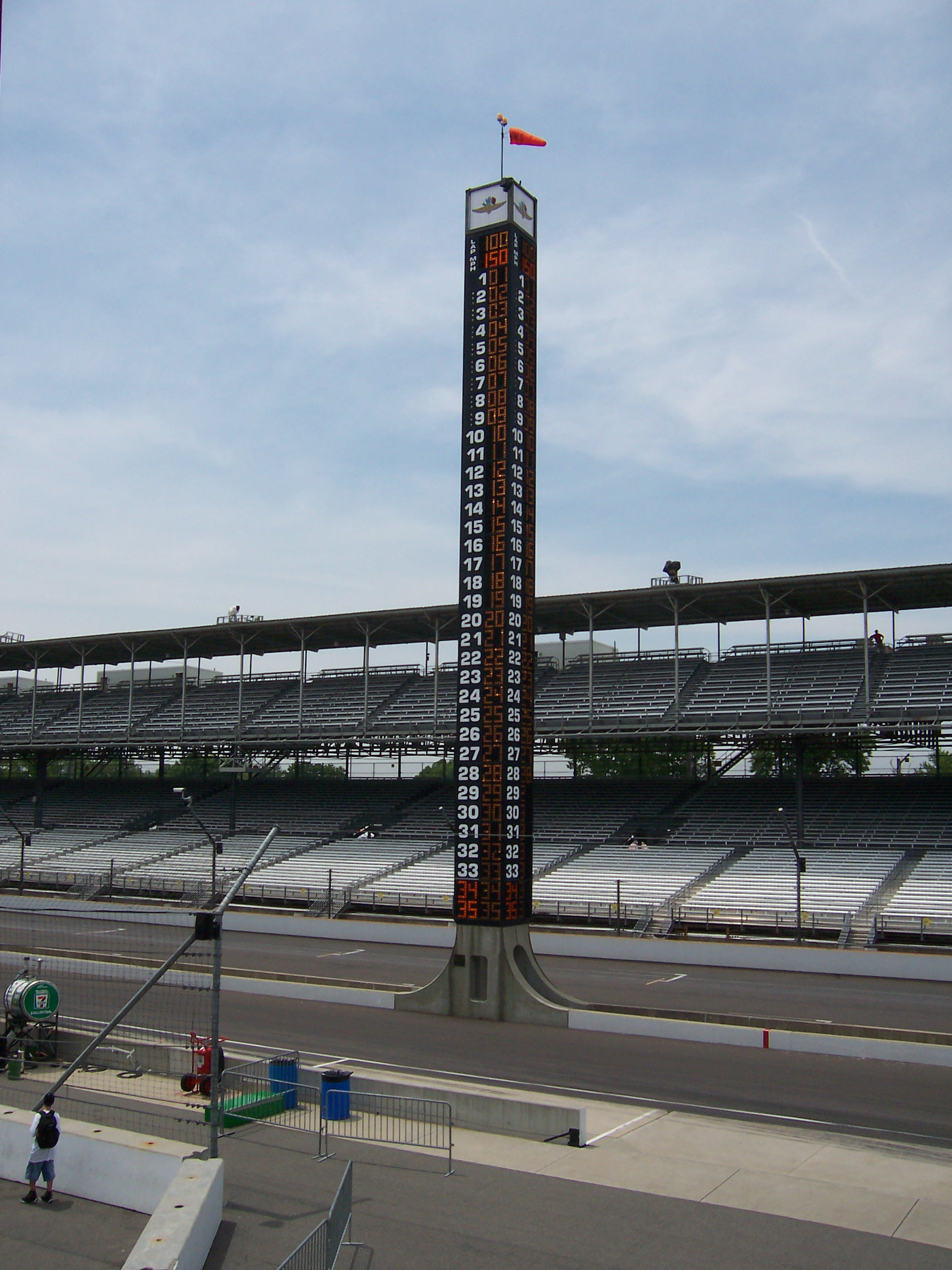
The new Pylon, which stood from 1994 to 2014.

=== Saturday May 7 – Opening Day ===
Rain washed out opening day, the first time since 1975.

=== Sunday May 8 ===
Dick Simon Racing cars of Lyn St. James, Raul Boesel, Hiro Matsushita, Dennis Vitolo, Hideshi Matsuda and Tero Palmroth were the first cars out on the track, creating a "Flying V" formation.

Paul Tracy took the first laps in the Penske PC-23/Mercedes 500I at 12:34 p.m. Al Unser Jr., however, was testing at Michigan International Speedway, reportedly "working on reliability." Tracy's fastest lap was 220.103 mph.

Bobby Rahal took the first laps at Indy in the Honda, with a fast lap of 219.791 mph. Scott Brayton, in the Menard Buick posted the fastest lap of the day at 227.658 mph.

=== Monday May 9 ===
At 4:45 p.m., Mike Groff's Honda engine failed, which caused the car to spin and crash into the wall in the southchute. He was not seriously injured.

Defending Indy Lights champion Bryan Herta, who had started the month with Tasman Motorsports, was withdrawn from that entry, and signed with Foyt.

Emerson Fittipaldi (after 'shake down' laps on Sunday) turned in his first fast laps driving the Penske PC-23/Mercedes Benz 500I, completed a lap of 226.512 mph. Al Unser Jr. took to the track for the first time in the Mercedes as well. Michael Andretti led the speed chart in the new Reynard, at 227.038 mph.

=== Tuesday May 10 ===
Raul Boesel broke the 230 mph barrier at 5:55 p.m., the first driver to do so since 1992. His lap of 230.403 was the fastest thus far for the month. The Penske-Mercedes was close behind, turning in their best laps of the month. Paul Tracy was second-fastest for the day at 229.961 mph, and Fittipaldi was third at 229.264 mph.

During the afternoon practice, an annular eclipse crossed over the state of Indiana, including the Speedway. Track temperatures cooled, and generally faster laps were observed during the phenomenon.

=== Wednesday May 11 ===
A windy day kept speed down. Al Unser Jr. in a Penske PC-23/Mercedes Benz 500I, led the chart at 226.478 mph.

=== Thursday May 12 ===
Emerson Fittipaldi drove his Penske PC-23/Mercedes Benz 500I to a lap of 230.438 mph, with a trap speed of 244 mph down the backstretch. Paul Tracy was second-quick at 228.444 mph (244 mph trap speed).

=== Friday May 13 ===
At 3:37 p.m., Paul Tracy spun his Penske PC-23/Mercedes Benz 500I in turn 3, hit the outside wall, then crashed into the inside guardrail. He suffered a concussion, and was forced to sit out the first day of time trials.

Emerson Fittipaldi was quickest of the day at 230.138 mph, making him a favorite for the pole position.

== Time Trials – Weekend 1 ==
=== Pole day – Saturday May 14 ===
A mix of sun and rain showers stretched the qualifying line throughout the afternoon. A short shower delayed the start of qualifying until 12:15 p.m. Rookie Hideshi Matsuda became the first driver in the field, posting a 4-lap average of 222.545 mph.

At 12:50 p.m., Raul Boesel took the provisional pole position with a run of 227.618 mph. Later, Jacques Villeneuve qualified as the fastest rookie, with a speed of 226.259 mph.

At 1:18 p.m., Al Unser Jr. became the first Penske driver to take the track, attempting to qualify one of the three Penske PC-23/Mercedes Benz 500I machines. His first lap of 225.722 mph was disappointingly slow, but his speed over the last three laps climbed dramatically. His final four-lap average of 228.011 mph took over the provisional pole position.

Bobby Rahal (220.178 mph) and Mike Groff (218.808 mph) completed slow runs in their Honda-powered machines, and were the slowest two cars of the day.

A second rain shower closed the track from about 2–5 p.m. When qualifying resumed, there was not enough time to complete the entire qualifying line. Among the runs were Lyn St. James (224.154 mph) tentatively putting her 5th fastest, and Al Unser Sr. who waved off after a lap of 214 mph.

The 6 o'clock gun sounded with several drivers still in line, including Mario Andretti and Emerson Fittipaldi. Pole qualifying would be extended into the following day.

=== Second day – Sunday May 15 ===
The pole qualifying line resumed where it left off from the previous day, with Mario Andretti first out. Emerson Fittipaldi was the final car eligible for the pole position, and took his run at 1:18 p.m. His speed of 227.303 mph was not enough to bump his teammate Al Unser Jr. off the pole, but qualified him in third position. The front row was rounded out by Raul Boesel, while Lyn St. James held on to qualify for the outside of the second row, the highest starting position for a female driver to-date.

Official Pole Day qualifiers
Pos.	No.	Driver	Team	Chassis	Engine	Speed
1	31	(United States) Al Unser Jr. W	Team Penske	Penske	Mercedes-Benz 500I	228.011
2	5	(Brazil) Raul Boesel	Dick Simon Racing	Lola	Ford XB	227.618
3	2	(Brazil) Emerson Fittipaldi W	Team Penske	Penske	Mercedes-Benz 500I	227.303
4	12	(Canada) Jacques Villeneuve R	Forsythe/Green Racing	Reynard	Ford XB	226.259
5	8	(United States) Michael Andretti	Chip Ganassi Racing	Reynard	Ford XB	226.205
6	90	(United States) Lyn St. James	Dick Simon Racing	Lola	Ford XB	224.154
7	1	(United Kingdom) Nigel Mansell	Newman/Haas Racing	Lola	Ford XB	224.041
8	28	(Netherlands) Arie Luyendyk W	Indy Regency Racing	Lola	Ilmor	223.673
9	6	(United States) Mario Andretti W	Newman/Haas Racing	Lola	Ford XB	223.503
10	33	(United States) John Andretti	A. J. Foyt Enterprises	Lola	Ford XB	223.263
11	27	(United States) Eddie Cheever	Team Menard	Lola	Menard	223.163
12	17	(United States) Dominic Dobson	PacWest Racing	Lola	Ford XB	222.970
13	91	(United States) Stan Fox	Hemelgarn Racing	Reynard	Ford XB	222.867
14	99	(Japan) Hideshi Matsuda R	Dick Simon Racing	Lola	Ford XB	222.545
15	79	(United States) Dennis Vitolo R	Dick Simon Racing	Lola	Ford XB	222.439
16	18	(United States) Jimmy Vasser	Hayhoe Racing	Reynard	Ford XB	222.262
17	71	(United States) Scott Sharp R	PacWest Racing	Lola	Ford XB	222.091
18	22	(Japan) Hiro Matsushita	Dick Simon Racing	Lola	Ford XB	221.382
19	9	(United States) Robby Gordon	Walker Racing	Lola	Ford XB	221.293
20	21	(Colombia) Roberto Guerrero	Pagan Racing	Lola	Buick	221.278
21	19	(United States) Brian Till R	Payton/Coyne Racing	Lola	Ford XB	221.107
22	14	(United States) Bryan Herta R	A. J. Foyt Enterprises	Lola	Ford XB	220.992
23	88	(Brazil) Maurício Gugelmin	Chip Ganassi Racing	Reynard	Ford XB	220.460
24	4	(United States) Bobby Rahal W	Rahal-Hogan Racing	Lola	Honda	220.178
25	10	(United States) Mike Groff	Rahal-Hogan Racing	Lola	Honda	218.808

After his crash Friday, Paul Tracy returned to the track Sunday. Since he sat out time trials on Saturday and missed his spot in line, he was ineligible for the pole position. He qualified as a second-day qualifier, and would line up his Penske PC-23/Mercedes Benz 500I 25th on race day. After two wave-offs on Saturday, Scott Brayton finally put his Menard-powered Lola in the field as the fastest qualifier for the second round.

Second Day qualifiers
Pos.	No.	Driver	Team	Chassis	Engine	Speed
26	59	(United States) Scott Brayton	Team Menard	Lola	Menard	223.652
27	11	(Italy) Teo Fabi	Jim Hall/VDS Racing	Reynard	Ilmor	223.394
28	3	(Canada) Paul Tracy	Team Penske	Penske	Mercedes-Benz 500I	222.710
29	7	(Mexico) Adrian Fernandez R	Galles Racing	Reynard	Ilmor	222.657
30	16	(Sweden) Stefan Johansson	Bettenhausen Racing	Penske	Ilmor	221.518

== Practice – Week 2 ==
=== Monday May 16 ===
A leisurely day of practice saw only 18 cars take laps. Emerson Fittipaldi, working on race set-ups, ran the best lap at 226.421 mph. Robby Gordon spent time shaking down back-up cars for his teammates Willy T. Ribbs and Mark Smith.

=== Tuesday May 17 ===
Four-time Indy 500 winner Al Unser Sr. officially announced his retirement from driving at a press conference. His son, pole winner Al Unser Jr. was sick, and rested away from the track.

Off the track, Rahal-Hogan Racing announced they had entered into a deal with Team Penske to lease two back-up cars. Driving the new Honda HRX Indy V-8s, Bobby Rahal and Mike Groff were the two slowest cars in the field, and risked being bumped. If Rahal were to not qualify, it would mark the second year in a row. Through a sponsorship connection, Roger Penske offered Rahal and Groff the use of two 1993 PC-22/Ilmor V-8 machines (2.65L). Rahal received an Ilmor D engine, while Groff received an Ilmor C+ engine. They were not the Mercedes-Benz 209I power plants, however they were competitive enough to comfortably make the field if needed. Paul Tracy shook down the cars before handing them over to the Rahal team.

Mark Smith (219.947 mph) was the fastest of the non-qualified drivers, and veteran Roberto Moreno took over Al Unser, Sr.'s car, starting a refresher test.

=== Wednesday May 18 ===
Mark Smith (220.324 mph) was again the fastest of the non-qualified drivers. Mike Groff (221.560 mph), driving the 1993 Penske/Ilmor, was already practicing faster than his qualifying speed in the Honda.

=== Thursday May 19 ===
A busy day of practice saw 36 cars complete 1,511 laps. John Paul Jr. (222.058 mph) was the fastest non-qualified car.

=== Friday May 20 ===
The final full day of practice saw 32 cars complete 1,154 laps. John Paul Jr. (221.691 mph) was yet again the fastest non-qualified car.

== Time Trials – Weekend 2 ==
=== Third day – Saturday May 21 ===
John Paul Jr. was the first car out for the afternoon, and safely put his car into the field. Later, Scott Goodyear completed a run at 220.737 mph. With temperatures in the 80s, the track sat dormant for most of the afternoon. That led to a ceremonial final lap for three time Indianapolis 500 champion Johnny Rutherford, driving the exact same car A. J. Foyt had driven the previous year in his ceremonial final lap.

At 5:37 p.m., Mark Smith (220.683 mph) filled the field to 33 cars. Davy Jones (the teammate to Scott Goodyear at King Racing) made the field in car #40T at 223.817 mph. Mike Groff and Bobby Rahal, the two slowest cars in the field, saw their Honda-powered machines bumped from the field, and re-qualified in the borrowed Penske-Ilmor cars. Both drivers improved their speeds significantly, with Rahal now the seventh-fastest car overall in the field. Both Rahal and Groff were safely in the field, and would avoid missing the race as the team had done in 1993.

The day ended with Scott Goodyear (220.737 mph), driving car #40 for King Racing, on the bubble. Gary Bettenhausen, after lapping in the 223 mph range, crashed during a practice run, damaging the rear end of the car. The team would be forced to make quick repairs overnight in order to be ready to attempt to qualify on Bump Day.

Third Day qualifiers
Pos.	No.	Driver	Team	Chassis	Engine	Speed
28	50	(United States) Bobby Rahal W	Rahal-Hogan Racing	Penske	Ilmor	224.094
29	40T	(United States) Davy Jones	King Racing	Lola	Ford XB	223.817
30	89	(Brazil) Maurício Gugelmin	Chip Ganassi Racing	Reynard	Ford XB	223.104
31	45	(United States) John Paul Jr.	ProFormance Motorsports	Lola	Ilmor	222.500
32	52T	(United States) Mike Groff	Rahal-Hogan Racing	Penske	Ilmor	221.355
33	40	(Canada) Scott Goodyear*	King Racing	Lola	Ford XB	220.737
Not yet qualified
	15	(United States) Mark Smith R	Walker Racing	Lola	Ford XB	220.683
	44	(Finland) Tero Palmroth	Arizona Motorsport	Lola	Ford XB	Waved off
	23	(United States) Buddy Lazier	Leader Card Racing	Lola	Ilmor	Waved off

*on the bubble

=== Bump day – Sunday May 22 ===
Another hot day (89 degrees) saw the cars stay off the track for most of the afternoon. Marco Greco made the first qualifying attempt at 5:35 p.m. Greco bumped Scott Goodyear (car #40) from the field. The move put Bryan Herta (220.992 mph), driving for A. J. Foyt, on the bubble. Herta had practiced in his back-up car at over 223 mph, but the team decided not to withdraw the primary car prematurely. Greco ran out of fuel on his cool down lap and stalled in the warm-up lane in turn four. However, with the clock ticking, officials elected not to waste time towing him back to the pits. Since the car was mostly out of harm's way, he was instructed to sit safely in the machine until after the session was over.

With twenty minutes left in the day, Geoff Brabham was the next driver to make an attempt. His first lap was fast enough to bump Herta, but the second and third laps dropped off, and the Menard team waved off the run. Mark Smith, bumped out at the end of the day on Saturday, was the next car out. With only 15 minutes to go, he was trying to break the "Curse of the Smiths" at the Speedway. On his first lap, however, he wrecked in turn one.

Track crews were able to make a quick clean up, and the track re-opened at 5:52 p.m. Herta was still clinging to the bubble spot, and Gary Bettenhausen was now waiting at the front of the qualifying line. The car of Didier Theys was pulled out of qualifying line, moving Herta (waiting in his backup car) up to second in line. After wrecking his car in practice on Saturday morning, Bettenhausen made it out with 8 minutes remaining for a last-ditch effort to bump his way into the field. He managed two laps at only 218 mph, and waved off.

With less than three minutes left until the 6 o'clock gun, A. J. Foyt pulled Bryan Herta's back-up car out of the qualifying line. That moved Willy T. Ribbs (in a Walker Racing back-up machine) to the front of the line for a long-shot attempt to make the field. Ribbs had not driven any laps in the car, and rolled from the pits with less than two minutes to go. After a lap of 216 mph, then dropping to 212 mph, he waved off and time trials came to a close.

After second-guessing their strategy overnight, the Foyt team ultimately made the right decision and did not withdraw Bryan Herta's car from the field. The hot conditions Sunday worked in their favor, and Herta held on as the 33rd-fastest qualifier. Not since A. J. Foyt was the 32nd-fastest car in the field in 1973 had the Foyt team been so close to being bumped and missing the race entirely.

== Carburetion Day ==
The final practice session was held Thursday May 26. All 33 qualified cars turned laps, with Mario Andretti (223.708 mph) the fastest of the day. No incidents were reported. The field notably completed only 624 laps combined for the two-hour session, with Adrian Fernandez (24 laps) running the most number of laps.

King Racing announced that it was swapping drivers for its two cars. Davy Jones was removed from the #40T entry, and full-time driver Scott Goodyear was placed in the car. Jones was put in the #40 car, and was now the first alternate. The move required Goodyear to start the race from the 33rd starting position. The car had qualified for the 29th position (middle of row 10).

=== Pit Stop Contest ===
The elimination rounds for the 18th annual Miller Genuine Draft Pit Stop Contest were held on Thursday May 26. The top three race qualifiers and their respective pit crews were automatically eligible: Al Unser Jr., Raul Boesel, and Emerson Fittipaldi. However, Fittipaldi's crew declined the invitation. Jacques Villeneuve (who qualified 4th) took that empty spot. Two additional quarterfinal spots would be filled by preliminaries scheduled for May 18–19, for a total of five participants.

On Wednesday May 18, the Galles Racing team made their preliminary run. Adrián Fernández, however, failed to post a time. On Thursday May 19, four additional teams made their preliminary attempts. The results were as follows: Bryan Herta (12.990 seconds), John Paul Jr. (13.420 seconds), Nigel Mansell (stalled engine), John Andretti (stalled engine). Herta and Paul advanced to the quarterfinal bracket.

John Paul Jr. defeated Bryan Herta to reach the semifinals. Paul then faced race pole-sitter Al Unser Jr. in the semifinals. Unser posted a time of 14.636 seconds, but was penalized 10 seconds for running over the air hose, and an additional 5 seconds for a loose wheel. Paul's crew had a clean stop, and advanced to the final round. Rookie Jacques Villeneuve won the other semifinal match over Raul Boesel. In the final round match, Jacques Villeneuve, led by chief mechanic Kyle Moyer, defeated John Paul Jr., led by chief mechanic Randy Bain. Villeneuve became the first rookie driver to win the event since Michael Andretti in 1984.

Quarterfinals
45	John Paul Jr. (Pro Formance Racing)	14.517
14	Bryan Herta (A. J. Foyt Enterprises)	21.754

Semifinals
45	John Paul Jr. (Pro Formance Racing)	15.670
31	Al Unser Jr. (Team Penske)	29.636
12	Jacques Villeneuve (Forsythe-Green Racing)	13.629
5	Raul Boesel (Dick Simon Racing)	15.393

Finals
12	Jacques Villeneuve (Forsythe-Green Racing)	12.867
45	John Paul Jr. (Pro Formance Racing)	13.590

== Starting grid ==
Row	Inside		Middle		Outside	
1	31	(United States) Al Unser Jr. W Penske PC-23/Mercedes Benz 500I; 228.011 mph (366.948 km/h)	5	(Brazil) Raul Boesel; Lola T9400/Ford Cosworth XB; 227.618 mph (366.316 km/h)	2	(Brazil) Emerson Fittipaldi W Penske PC-23/Mercedes Benz 500I; 227.303 mph (365.809 km/h)
2	12	(Canada) Jacques Villeneuve R Reynard 94I/Ford Cosworth XB; 226.259 mph (364.129 km/h)	8	(United States) Michael Andretti; Reynard 94I/Ford Cosworth XB; 226.205 mph (364.042 km/h)	90	(United States) Lyn St. James; Lola T9400/Ford Cosworth XB; 224.154 mph (360.741 km/h)
3	1	(United Kingdom) Nigel Mansell; Lola T9400/Ford Cosworth XB; 224.041 mph (360.559 km/h)	28	(Netherlands) Arie Luyendyk W Lola T9400/Ilmor D 223.673 mph (359.967 km/h)	6	(United States) Mario Andretti W Lola T9400/Ford Cosworth XB; 223.503 mph (359.693 km/h)
4	33	(United States) John Andretti; Lola T9400/Ford Cosworth XB; 223.263 mph (359.307 km/h)	27	(United States) Eddie Cheever Jr. Lola T9300/Menard V-6; 223.163 mph (359.146 km/h)	17	(United States) Dominic Dobson; Lola T9400/Ford Cosworth XB; 222.970 mph (358.835 km/h)
5	91	(United States) Stan Fox; Reynard 94I/Ford Cosworth XB; 222.867 mph (358.670 km/h)	99	(Japan) Hideshi Matsuda R Lola T9300/Ford Cosworth XB; 222.545 mph (358.151 km/h)	79	(United States) Dennis Vitolo R Lola T9300/Ford Cosworth XB; 222.439 mph (357.981 km/h)
6	18	(United States) Jimmy Vasser; Reynard 94I/Ford Cosworth XB; 222.262 mph (357.696 km/h)	71	(United States) Scott Sharp R Lola T9400/Ford Cosworth XB; 222.091 mph (357.421 km/h)	22	(Japan) Hiro Matsushita; Lola T9400/Ford Cosworth XB; 221.382 mph (356.280 km/h)
7	9	(United States) Robby Gordon; Lola T9400/Ford Cosworth XB; 221.293 mph (356.137 km/h)	21	(Colombia) Roberto Guerrero; Lola T9200/Buick V-6; 221.278 mph (356.112 km/h)	19	(United States) Brian Till R Lola T9300/Ford Cosworth XB; 221.107 mph (355.837 km/h)
8	14	(United States) Bryan Herta R Lola T9400/Ford Cosworth XB; 220.992 mph (355.652 km/h)	59	(United States) Scott Brayton; Lola T9300/Menard V-6; 223.652 mph (359.933 km/h)	11	(Italy) Teo Fabi; Reynard 94I/Ilmor D 223.394 mph (359.518 km/h)
9	3	(Canada) Paul Tracy; Penske PC-23/Mercedes Benz 500I; 222.710 mph (358.417 km/h)	7	(Mexico) Adrian Fernandez R Reynard 94I/Ilmor D 222.657 mph (358.332 km/h)	16	(Sweden) Stefan Johansson; Penske PC-22/Ilmor D 221.518 mph (356.499 km/h)
10	4	(United States) Bobby Rahal W Penske PC-22/Ilmor D 224.094 mph (360.644 km/h)	88	(Brazil) Mauricio Gugelmin R Reynard 94I/Ford Cosworth XB; 223.104 mph (359.051 km/h)	45	(United States) John Paul Jr. Lola T9300/Ilmor C 222.500 mph (358.079 km/h)
11	10	(United States) Mike Groff; Penske PC-22/Ilmor C+ 221.355 mph (356.236 km/h)	25	(Brazil) Marco Greco R Lola T9400/Ford Cosworth XB; 221.216 mph (356.013 km/h)	40	(Canada) Scott Goodyear†; Lola T9400/Ford Cosworth XB; 223.817 mph (360.199 km/h)

† Scott Goodyear and Davy Jones were teammates for King Racing. Goodyear was the full-time primary driver, and Jones (who had incidentally left Foyt before start of the month) the second team driver. At the close of qualifying, Jones had qualified 29th (the overall 9th-fastest car in the field), but Goodyear was bumped. As a gesture to the team and sponsor requests, Goodyear took Jones' place behind the wheel on race day. The driver switch required the car to be moved to the rear of the field. The move mirrored a nearly identical situation for Goodyear in the 1992 race.

=== Alternates ===
- First alternate: Davy Jones (#40/60) – Switched cars with Scott Goodyear
- Second alternate: Mark Smith (#15) – Bumped

=== Failed to qualify ===
Driver	Car #	Chassis	Engine	Entrant	Reason
(United States) Jeff Andretti	94	Lola T9200	Buick V-6	Hemelgarn Racing	
(Canada) Ross Bentley R	39	Lola T9300	Ford-Cosworth XB	Dale Coyne Racing	
(United States) Gary Bettenhausen	61	Penske PC-22	Ilmor C	Bettenhausen Racing	Waved off, too slow
(Australia) Geoff Brabham	59	Lola T9300	Menard V-6	Team Menard	Waved off, too slow
(United States) Pancho Carter	30	Lola T9300	Ilmor C	McCormack Motorsports	
(United Kingdom) Jim Crawford	74	Lola T9100	Buick V-6	Riley & Scott	
(Sweden) Fredrik Ekblom R	35	Lola T9300	Ilmor C	McCormack Motorsports	Passed rookie orientation
(United States) Michael Greenfield R	42	Lola T9300	Greenfield V-8	Greenfield Racing	Did not finish rookie orientation
(France) Stéphan Grégoire	30	Lola T9300	Ilmor C	McCormack Motorsports	
(United States) Davy Jones	40	Lola T9400	Ford-Cosworth XB	King Racing	Replaced by Scott Goodyear
(United States) Davy Jones	14	Lola T9400	Ford-Cosworth XB	A. J. Foyt Enterprises	Replaced by Bryan Herta
(United States) Buddy Lazier	23	Lola T9300	Ilmor C	Leader Card	
(United States) Buddy Lazier	94	Lola T9200	Buick V-6	Hemelgarn Racing	
(Brazil) Roberto Moreno	44	Lola T9400	Ford-Cosworth XB	Arizona Motor-Sport	
(Finland) Tero Palmroth	44	Lola T9400	Ford-Cosworth XB	Arizona Motor-Sport	
(Finland) Tero Palmroth	79	Lola T9300	Ford-Cosworth XB	Dick Simon Racing	
(United States) Johnny Parsons	42	Lola T9300	Greenfield V-8	Greenfield Racing	
(United States) Willy T. Ribbs	9	Lola T9400	Ford-Cosworth XB	Walker Racing	Drove #24 instead
(United States) Willy T. Ribbs	24	Lola T9400	Ford-Cosworth XB	Walker Racing	Waved off, too slow
(United States) Johnny Rutherford W	14	Lola T9300	Ford-Cosworth XB	A. J. Foyt Enterprises	Retired
(United States) Mark Smith R	15	Lola T9400	Ford-Cosworth XB	Walker Racing	Bumped, crashed trying to re-bump back into field
(United States) Al Unser Sr. W	44	Lola T9400	Ford-Cosworth XB	Arizona Motor-Sport	Retired

R = Indianapolis 500 rookie
W = Former Indianapolis 500 winner

== Race summary ==
=== Pre race ===
Hours before the start, Al Unser Sr. took a ceremonial final lap of the track in an IndyCar, the same car he won the 1987 Indianapolis 500 with. General Chuck Yeager lead the flyover in a P-51 Mustang.

=== Start ===
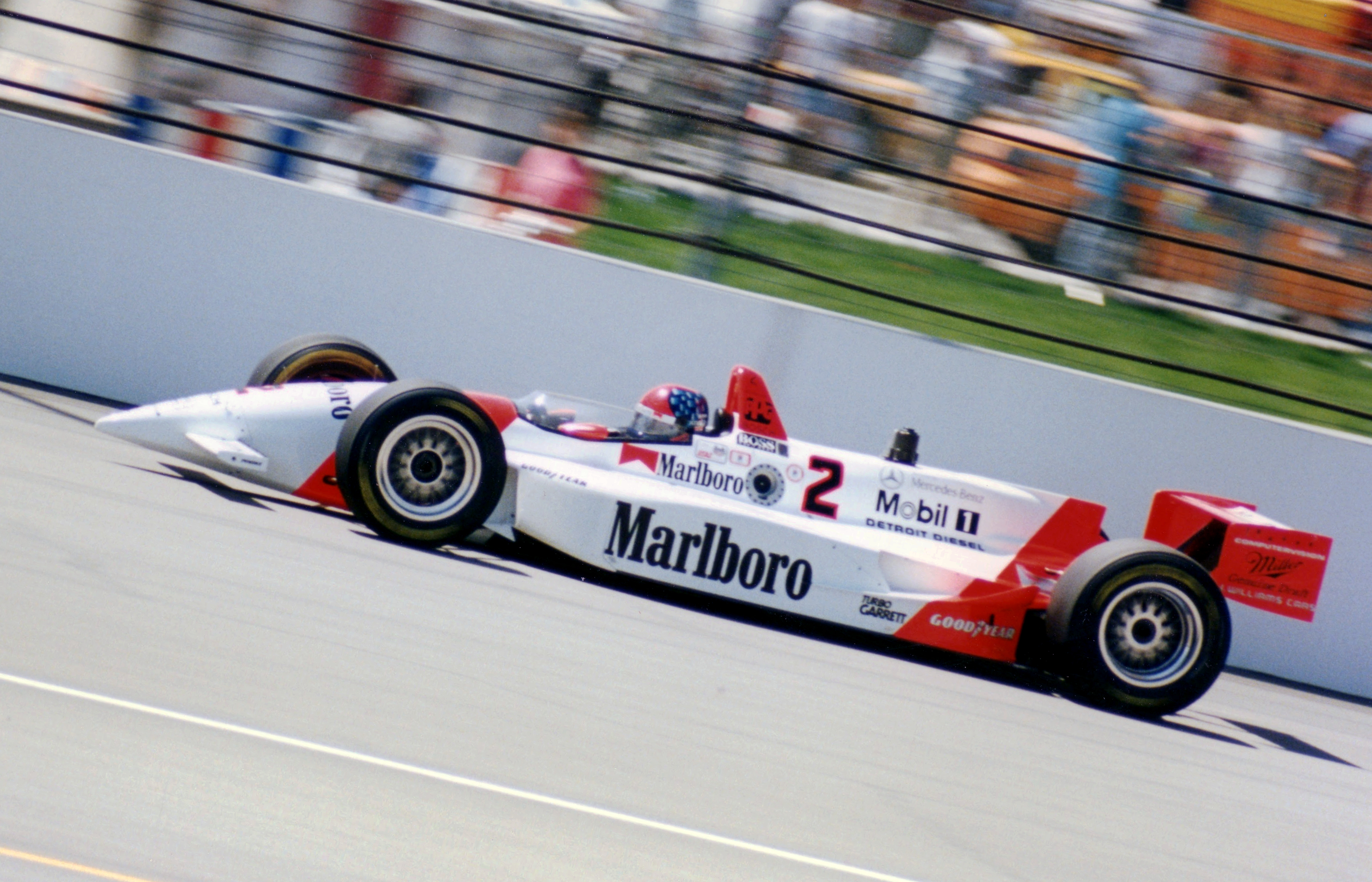
Emerson Fittipaldi dominated the 1994 Indianapolis 500 until his crash on lap 185

Clear blue skies dawned on race day, with temperatures in the mid-70s. The command to start engines was made on-time at 10:52 a.m. EST, and the field pulled away for the pace laps. Pole-sitter Al Unser Jr. led fellow front-row starters Emerson Fittipaldi and Raul Boesel.

As the field came around for the start, Penske teammates Unser and Fittipaldi, driving the Mercedes-powered entries, took off out of turn four. They weaved down the frontstretch single-file, blocking, and leaving behind Boesel and the rest of the field behind. USAC officials decided not to wave off the start, and Unser led into turn one. It quickly became evident to competitors and media that the Penske-Mercedes machines were the class of the field, as many had predicted.

On lap 6, Dennis Vitolo spun coming out of turn four, but made no contact. Vitolo was able to continue, but the incident brought out the first caution of the day.

=== First half ===
On lap 20, Roberto Guerrero crashed in turn two, bringing out the second caution of the race. On lap 23, the leaders made their first scheduled pit stops. Mario Andretti dropped out early from his final "500" with ignition problems. Leader Al Unser Jr. stalled exiting the pits (a concern going into the race for the Mercedes) and Emerson Fittipaldi took over the lead for the first time.

The yellow came back out again when Mike Groff and Dominic Dobson touched wheels and crashed in Turn 1. In the melee, Adrian Fernandez hit a piece of debris and damaged his rear suspension. Lyn St. James clipped the rear wheel of Scott Goodyear, and both cars limped back to the pits. Fernandez and Goodyear would drop out in what would be King Racings final 500 as the team would fold at the end of the season, and after a lengthy pit stop for repairs, St. James was able to get back out on the track. On the ensuing restart, Michael Andretti suffered a puncture, and was forced to pit for new tires. He stalled the car leaving the pits, and subsequently went a lap down. Eddie Cheever and Nigel Mansell were both given black flags for passing Raul Boesel prior to the restart, forcing both to serve as stop-and-go penalty in the pits.

By lap 85, Fittipaldi had stretched his lead to 24.6 seconds over second-place Unser. Rookie Jacques Villeneuve was a lap down, running as high as third.

On Lap 92 Hideshi Matsuda crashed in Turn 2. Under the yellow, John Paul Jr. then spun and crashed in turn 3. As the field was circulating through turn three warm-up lane behind the pace car, Dennis Vitolo was barreling down the backstretch trying to catch up with the field. He misjudged the speed of the field, and approached the line of cars too fast. He ran into the back of John Andretti's car, touched wheels with him, and spun forward in a clockwise rotation. The back of the car then rammed the back of Nigel Mansell's car, and climbed up it sideways. Al Unser Jr., among others, narrowly escaped the incident. Vitolo was found on top of Mansell, and the cars were sideways in the infield grass. Hot coolant and oil began to leak from Vitolo's car, and dripped into Mansell's cockpit. Mansell scurried out of the car and was tackled to the ground by corner workers in an effort to put out any fire. Mansell later stormed out of the infield medical care center, angrily refusing treatment. Vitolo admitted blame for the incident.

At the halfway point, Unser (23) and Fittipaldi (75) combined to lead 98 of the first 100 laps. The third Penske entry driven by Paul Tracy, however, began smoking during the lap 92 yellow and dropped out with turbocharger failure.

=== Second half ===
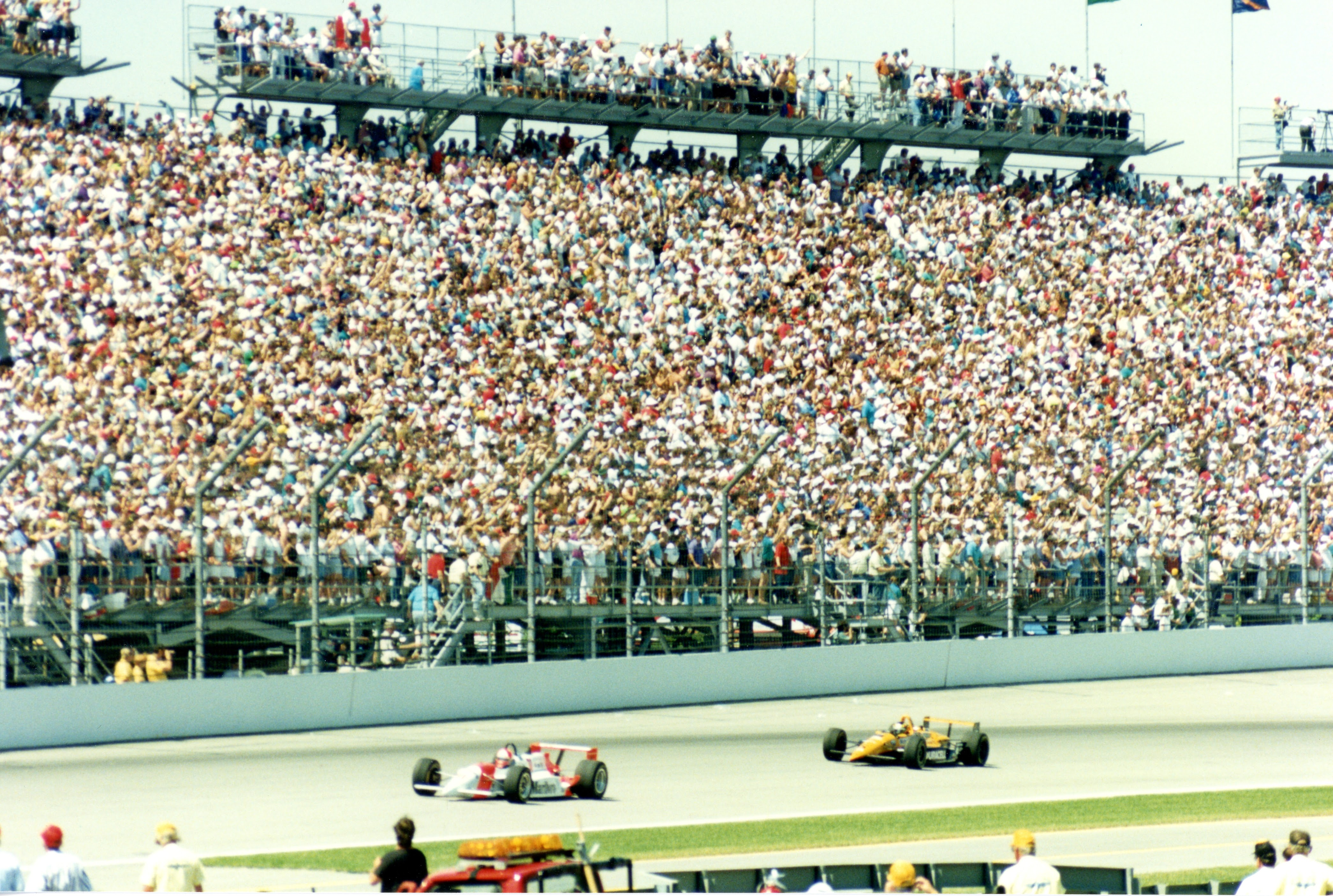
Al Unser Jr. leads Raul Boesel during the race

Early contenders Raul Boesel (overheating) and Scott Brayton (spark plug) both dropped out in the second half. Fittipaldi continued to dominate, pulling away at will. On Lap 121 he set the fastest lap of the race at 40.783 seconds, equaling 220.68 mph (355.15 km/h).

During a round of pit stops by Fittipaldi and Unser, rookie Jacques Villeneuve led five laps (125–129) before pitting himself. On lap 133, Fittipaldi was forced to return to the pits to remove a plastic bag from his radiator inlet.

A long stretch of green flag racing followed. Fittipaldi quickly caught Unser and extended his lead. By lap 157, they were the only two cars on the lead lap.

=== Finish ===
With less than 25 laps to go, Fittipaldi led Unser by almost 40 seconds. Third place Villeneuve was over a lap down. Fittipaldi was in need of one more splash-and-go pit stop for fuel before the race was over. Unser's crew, however, believed that they could make it to the finish without another pit stop, especially if there were to be a late yellow. With 20 laps to go, Fittipaldi put Unser a lap down, and was now a lap ahead of the entire field.

Fittipaldi's crew scheduled a "timed" splash-and-go, fuel-only pit stop for lap 194. Jockeying for position, Unser managed to un-lap himself on lap 183. Two laps later, Unser was just ahead of Fittipaldi as they approached turn four. Fittipaldi admitted a driver error as he drove over the inside rumble strips causing the rear tires to lose grip. Fittipaldi's car slid loose, and the right rear wheel tagged the outside wall exiting turn four. After leading 145 laps, Fittipaldi's crashed car slid to a stop down the mainstretch. The crash handed Unser the lead of the race with less than 16 laps to go. Rookie Jacques Villeneuve was now in second place, running at the tail end of the lead lap.

Arie Luyendyk blew an engine during the caution for Fittipaldi's crash. Unser was leading, but lost use of his two-way radio, and the team was increasingly concerned about his fuel mileage. The green came out with ten laps to go. Unser held a comfortable lead over Villeneuve, who was mired deep in traffic.

On Lap 196, Stan Fox, who was running in the top ten, crashed in turn one. The caution came out for clean-up, and erased any doubts about Unser's fuel mileage. Unser ended up winning the race under yellow. Unser won his second Indy 500, and the Penske-Mercedes 500I pushrod engine won in its first and only race. The win came on his father's 55th birthday, twenty-three years to the day after Unser Sr. won his second Indy 500. Villeneuve held on to finish second and won the rookie of the year award.

Michael Andretti finished third on the track, but officials ruled that he passed cars illegally under caution on lap 190. Officials were about to put out the black flag and issue Andretti a stop-and-go penalty, but the subsequent caution that came out for Stan Fox's crash prevented them for being able to do so. Since the race ended up finishing under yellow, USAC instead issued Andretti a 1-lap penalty for the infraction. He dropped from 3rd to 6th in the final standings. The ruling elevated Bobby Rahal to third place. Rahal had charged from the 28th starting position to finish third in the borrowed 1993 Penske-Ilmor machine.

John Andretti finished 10th, then flew to Charlotte Motor Speedway to compete in the Coca-Cola 600. He was the first driver to do "Double Duty", competing in both races on the same day.

== Box score ==
Finish	Start	No	Name	Qual	Chassis	Engine	Laps	Status	Entrant	Points
1	1	31	(United States) Al Unser Jr. W	228.011	Penske PC-23	Ilmor Mercedes-Benz 500I	200	160.872 mph	Team Penske	21
2	4	12	(Canada) Jacques Villeneuve R	226.259	Reynard 94I	Ford-Cosworth XB	200	+8.600 seconds	Forsythe/Green Racing	16
3	28	4	(United States) Bobby Rahal W	224.094	Penske PC-22	Ilmor D	199	Running	Rahal/Hogan Racing	14
4	16	18	(United States) Jimmy Vasser	222.262	Reynard 94I	Ford-Cosworth XB	199	Running	Hayhoe Racing	12
5	19	9	(United States) Robby Gordon	221.293	Lola T9400	Ford-Cosworth XB	199	Running	Walker Racing	10
6	5	8	(United States) Michael Andretti	226.205	Reynard 94I	Ford-Cosworth XB	198	Running	Chip Ganassi Racing	8
7	24	11	(Italy) Teo Fabi	223.394	Reynard 94I	Ilmor D	198	Running	Jim Hall Racing	6
8	11	27	(United States) Eddie Cheever	223.163	Lola T9300	Menard V-6	197	Running	Team Menard	5
9	22	14	(United States) Bryan Herta R	220.992	Lola T9400	Ford-Cosworth XB	197	Running	A. J. Foyt Enterprises	4
10	10	33	(United States) John Andretti	223.263	Lola T9400	Ford-Cosworth XB	196	Running	A. J. Foyt Enterprises	3
11	29	88	(Brazil) Maurício Gugelmin R	223.104	Reynard 94I	Ford-Cosworth XB	196	Running	Chip Ganassi Racing	2
12	21	19	(United States) Brian Till R	221.107	Lola T9300	Ford-Cosworth XB	194	Running	Dale Coyne Racing	1
13	13	91	(United States) Stan Fox	222.867	Reynard 94I	Ford-Cosworth XB	193	Crash T1	Hemelgarn Racing	
14	18	22	(Japan) Hiro Matsushita	221.382	Lola T9400	Ford-Cosworth XB	193	Running	Dick Simon Racing	
15	27	16	(Sweden) Stefan Johansson	221.518	Penske PC-22	Ilmor D	192	Running	Bettenhausen Racing	
16	17	71	(United States) Scott Sharp R	222.091	Lola T9400	Ford-Cosworth XB	186	Running	PacWest Racing	
17	3	2	(Brazil) Emerson Fittipaldi W	227.303	Penske PC-23	Ilmor Mercedes-Benz 500I	184	Crash T4	Team Penske	1
18	8	28	(Netherlands) Arie Luyendyk W	223.673	Lola T9400	Ilmor D	179	Engine	Indy Regency Racing	
19	6	90	(United States) Lyn St. James	224.154	Lola T9400	Ford-Cosworth XB	170	Running	Dick Simon Racing	
20	23	59	(United States) Scott Brayton	223.652	Lola T9300	Menard V-6	116	Engine	Team Menard	
21	2	5	(Brazil) Raul Boesel	227.618	Lola T9400	Ford-Cosworth XB	100	Water Pump	Dick Simon Racing	
22	7	1	(United Kingdom) Nigel Mansell	224.041	Lola T9400	Ford-Cosworth XB	92	Accident T3	Newman/Haas Racing	
23	25	3	(Canada) Paul Tracy	222.710	Penske PC-23	Ilmor Mercedes-Benz 500I	92	Turbo	Team Penske	
24	14	99	(Japan) Hideshi Matsuda R	222.545	Lola T9400	Ford-Cosworth XB	90	Accident T1	Beck Motorsports	
25	30	45	(United States) John Paul Jr.	222.500	Lola T9300	Ilmor C	89	Accident T3	ProFormance Racing	
26	15	79	(United States) Dennis Vitolo R	222.439	Lola T9300	Ford-Cosworth XB	89	Accident T3	Dick Simon Racing	
27	32	25	(Brazil) Marco Greco R	221.216	Lola T9400	Ford-Cosworth XB	53	Electrical	Dick Simon Racing	
28	26	7	(Mexico) Adrian Fernández R	222.657	Reynard 94I	Ilmor D	30	Suspension	Galles Racing	
29	12	17	(United States) Dominic Dobson	222.970	Lola T9400	Ford-Cosworth XB	29	Accident T1	PacWest Racing	
30	33	40	(Canada) Scott Goodyear	223.817	Lola T9400	Ford-Cosworth XB	29	Suspension	King Racing	
31	31	10	(United States) Mike Groff	221.355	Penske PC-22	Ilmor C+	28	Accident T1	Rahal/Hogan Racing	
32	9	6	(United States) Mario Andretti W	223.503	Lola T9400	Ford-Cosworth XB	23	Fuel System	Newman/Haas Racing	
33	20	21	(Colombia) Roberto Guerrero	221.278	Lola T9200	Buick V-6	20	Accident T1	Pagan Racing	

W Former Indianapolis 500 winner

R Indianapolis 500 Rookie

All cars utilized Goodyear tires.

=== Race statistics ===
Lap Leaders
Laps	Leader
1–23	Al Unser Jr.
24–61	Emerson Fittipaldi
62–63	Jacques Villeneuve
64–124	Emerson Fittipaldi
125–129	Jacques Villeneuve
130–133	Emerson Fittipaldi
134–138	Al Unser Jr.
139–164	Emerson Fittipaldi
165–168	Al Unser Jr.
169–184	Emerson Fittipaldi
185–200	Al Unser Jr.

Total laps led
Driver	Laps
Emerson Fittipaldi	145
Al Unser Jr.	48
Jacques Villeneuve	7

Cautions: 7 for 43 laps
Laps	Reason
7–9	Dennis Vitolo spin in turn 4
21–27	Roberto Guerrero crash in turn 2
30–40	Dominic Dobson, Mike Groff crash in turn 1
92–100	Hideshi Matsuda crash in turn 1 John Paul Jr. crash in turn 3 Dennis Vitolo, Nigel Mansell crash in turn 3 warm up lane
137–139	Debris
185–190	Emerson Fittipaldi crash in turn 4
197–200	Stan Fox crash in turn 1

== Post race ==
Almost immediately after the race, both USAC and CART separately evaluated the situation that stemmed from the Mercedes-Benz 500I. USAC was initially willing to allow the pushrod engines in 1995, but were concerned about the potential for escalating costs. CART, as it had previously, refused to allow the engine increased boost at the events they sanctioned, effectively rendering it uncompetitive at those races.

Two weeks after the race, USAC announced that for 1995, the 209 cid purpose-built pushrod engines would be allowed 52 inHG of "boost" (down from 55 inHG). The traditional "stock block" production-based engines (e.g., Buick & Menard) would still be allowed 55 inHG. Meanwhile, the overhead cam 2.65L V-8 engines would stay at 45 inches. Other engine manufacturers, including Cosworth and Menard were considering 209 pushrod engines (Ilmor Engineering had already taken 30 customer orders for 500i engines for the 1995 race), and it became possible that to be competitive on the CART circuit, teams might require two separate engines for the season—a 2.65L OHC for the CART-sanctioned events, and a pushrod engine for Indianapolis singly—a daunting task which was expected to escalate costs.

During the summer of 1994, Tony George announced his plans to start the Indy Racing League in 1996, with an emphasis on cost-saving measures. On August 11, 1994, USAC changed its decision, and scaled back the boost for the purpose-built pushrod engines further to 48 inches; and outlawing it outright for 1996. The move was considered by Roger Penske as "politically motivated", and ultimately set back the Penske Team going into 1995. Observers negatively compared the radical rules change to way USAC handled the Granatelli Turbine in the late 1960s.

After the rules change, the 209-cid Mercedes-Benz 500I never raced again, but boasted a perfect 100% pole position and race winning record at Indianapolis, its only start in professional competition.

Despite reverting to the Ilmor D powerplant for the remainder of the 1994 CART season, Marlboro Team Penske continued to dominate. The three Penske drivers won 12 (of 16) races, including five 1-2-3 finishes. Penske swept the top three in the final championship points standings, with Al Unser Jr. winning the championship, Fittipaldi second, and Tracy third.

The 1994 Indy 500 would prove to be the final victory for a Penske-manufactured chassis at the Speedway. The following year, the 1995-spec Penske chassis, the PC-24, proved to be noncompetitive in time trials (despite a promising test in mid-April 1995). The team failed to qualify with it or the Lola and Reynard chassis that were borrowed from other teams as alternates. By the time the team returned to the race in 2001, in-house chassis manufacturing had ended in favor of using customer chassis.

Only 69 days after the race, the Indianapolis Motor Speedway ushered in a new era, hosting the Inaugural running of the Brickyard 400.

== Broadcasting ==
=== Radio ===
The race was carried live on the IMS Radio Network. Bob Jenkins served as chief announcer for the fifth year. Johnny Rutherford, who retired as a driver during the month, returned to serve as "driver expert". Historian Donald Davidson celebrated his 30th year on the broadcast.

The on-air crew returned intact for 1994, which marked the fourth consecutive year the crew has remained nearly exactly the same (1991–1994). This was the last year for pit reporters Brian Hammons and Chris McClure. This was also Gary Lee's last year in Turn 2.

The broadcast was carried on hundreds of affiliates in all 50 states of the U.S., as well as AFN and World Harvest Radio International, reaching all continents including Antarctica. The broadcast was heard in the UK on Autosport Racing Line.

Indianapolis Motor Speedway Radio Network
Booth Announcers	Turn Reporters	Pit/garage reporters
Chief Announcer: Bob Jenkins; Driver expert: Johnny Rutherford; Statistician: Howdy Bell; Historian: Donald Davidson	Turn 1: Jerry Baker; Turn 2: Gary Lee; Turn 3: Larry Henry; Turn 4: Bob Lamey	Bob Forbes (north pits); Brian Hammons (north-center pits); Sally Larvick (south-center pits); Chris McClure (south pits); Chuck Marlowe (garages/hospital)

=== Television ===
The race was carried live flag-to-flag coverage in the United States on ABC Sports. Paul Page served as host and play-by-play announcer. Newcomer and former Indy winner Danny Sullivan joined Bobby Unser and Sam Posey as color commentators. Sullivan, who tentatively retired from IndyCar racing in 1994, began dabbling in NASCAR as well as broadcasting. Sullivan took the turn four reporting location, while Bobby Unser reported from turn two. Posey remained in the booth with Page.

With the addition of Sullivan, the same crew from 1990 to 1993 returned. This was the first 500 broadcast to feature a "Score bug". A transparent digit was located on the upper right corner of the screen which counted down the number of laps remaining in the race. New on-board camera angles debuted, including a rear-wing mount on Michael Andretti's car, as well as a forward-facing camera mounted in front of the left rear wheel on Robby Gordon's car, which captured a spectacular duel with Raul Boesel. Bobby Rahal's car also featured a new nose-cam, the first such at the 500.

ABC Television
Booth Announcers	Pit/garage reporters
Host/Announcer: Paul Page; Color: Sam Posey; Color/Turn 2: Bobby Unser; Color/Turn 4: Danny Sullivan	Jack Arute; Gary Gerould; Dr. Jerry Punch

== Post-race CART PPG IndyCar World Series Standings ==
Rk.	##	Driver	Points	Diff.
1	31	(United States) Al Unser Jr.	58	0
2	2	(Brazil) Emerson Fittipaldi	38	−20
3	8	(United States) Michael Andretti	37	−21
4	1	(United Kingdom) Nigel Mansell	35	−23
5	18	(United States) Jimmy Vasser	34	−24
6	9	(United States) Robby Gordon	30	−28
7	16	(Sweden) Stefan Johansson	25	−33
8	6	(United States) Mario Andretti	24	−34
9	5	(Brazil) Raul Boesel	17	−41
10	12	(Canada) Jacques Villeneuve R	16	−42
10	11	(Italy) Teo Fabi	16	−42
10	88	(Brazil) Maurício Gugelmin	16	−42

== 1993–94 USAC Gold Crown Championship ==
1993–94 USAC Championship Car season
- USAC Gold Crown Championship

Season
- Races: 1

Awards
- National champion: (United States) Al Unser Jr.

The 1993–94 USAC Gold Crown Championship season consisted of one sanctioned race. The schedule was based on a split-calendar, beginning in June 1993 and running through May 1994. Starting in 1981, USAC scaled back their participation in top-level Indy car racing, and ultimately ceased sanctioning races outside of the Indianapolis 500 following their 1983–84 season. Subsequently, the Gold Crown Championship would consist of only one event annually; the winner of the Indianapolis 500 would be the de facto Gold Crown champion, as it was their lone points-paying event. The preeminent national championship season was instead sanctioned by CART, and the Indy 500 paid championship points separately (on a different scale) toward the CART championship as well.

Al Unser Jr., by virtue of winning the 1994 Indianapolis 500, also won the 1993–94 USAC Championship.

=== Final points standings (Top five) ===
Pos	Driver	INDY (United States)	Pts
1	(United States) Al Unser Jr.	1	1000
2	(Canada) Jacques Villeneuve	2	800
3	(United States) Bobby Rahal	3	700
4	(Brazil) Jimmy Vasser	4	600
5	(United States) Robby Gordon	5	500

== Notes ==
=== See also ===
- 1994 PPG Indy Car World Series

=== Works cited ===
- 1993 Indianapolis 500 Daily Trackside Reports
- Indianapolis 500 History: Race & All-Time Stats – Official Site
- 1994 Indianapolis 500 Radio Broadcast, Indianapolis Motor Speedway Radio Network

=== Further reading ===
- Mercedosaurus Rex at Indianapolic Park

=== Bibliography ===
- Indy Review, Volume 4: 78th Indianapolis 500. Osceola, WI: Indy 500 Publications / Indianapolis Motor Speedway Corporation. 1994. ISBN 978-1-880526-03-3.
- Gurss, Jade (May 13, 2014). Beast: The Top Secret Ilmor-Penske Race Car That Shocked the World at the 1994 Indy 500. Octane Press. ISBN 978-1937747350.

1993 Indianapolis 500; Emerson Fittipaldi	1994 Indianapolis 500; Al Unser Jr.	1995 Indianapolis 500; Jacques Villeneuve
