= Permission =

Permission may refer to:

== Arts, entertainment, and media ==
- Permission (film)
- Permission (magazine)
- "Permission" (song), 2015 single by Ro James
- La Permission, novel
- Permission to Land, album

== Ethics and law ==
- Permission (philosophy), ethical concept
- Intellectual property:
  - Historical Permission Notice and Disclaimer
  - Permission culture
- Planning permission, British property status

== Other uses ==
- File system permissions
  - Repair permissions
- Application permissions
- Permission marketing

== See also ==
- Persimmon, a fruit
