= Venstre =

Venstre ('left') is the name of two Scandinavian liberal political parties:

- Venstre (Denmark)
- Venstre (Norway)

== See also ==
- Moderate Venstre (disambiguation)
- Radikale Venstre
- Venstresocialisterne
