= Leaving (EP) =

EP by Skrillex
- Released: February 5, 2013
- Recorded: 2012
- Genre: Electronic, dubstep, garage
- Length: 12:41
- Label: Owsla; NEST
- Producer: Skrillex

Skrillex chronology
Bangarang (2011)	Leaving (2013)	Recess (2014)

Professional ratings
Review scores
Source	Rating
Consequence of Sound	2/5 stars
Exclaim!	6/10
MSN Music (Expert Witness)	A−
Rolling Stone	2.5/5 stars
Tom Hull	B+

Leaving is the sixth extended play (EP) by American electronic dance music producer Skrillex. It was released on February 5, 2013 exclusively to members of The Nest (Owsla's subscription service). The three tracks were also uploaded to Moore's official YouTube channel the following day. The song "Scary Bolly Dub" had previously been played live and circulated through the Internet for approximately a year before being officially released. A mixed version also features on Caspa Presents Dubstep Sessions 2012. The song samples the 2010 tracks "Scary Monsters and Nice Sprites" and "Fucking Die 1". In a personal message to members of The Nest, Moore said that he uses the track "more as a DJ tool, but I wanted you guys to have it". The title track was created in Moore's hotel room in Mexico. "The Reason" was finished an hour before release in Moore's hotel room in Miami. "The Reason" has received significant attention and airplay in Australia, mostly on youth radio station Triple J.

== Track listing ==
No.	Title	Length
1.	"The Reason"	4:17
2.	"Scary Bolly Dub"	3:39
3.	"Leaving"	4:46
Total length:		12:41
