= David Kudrave =

American racing driver (born 1966)

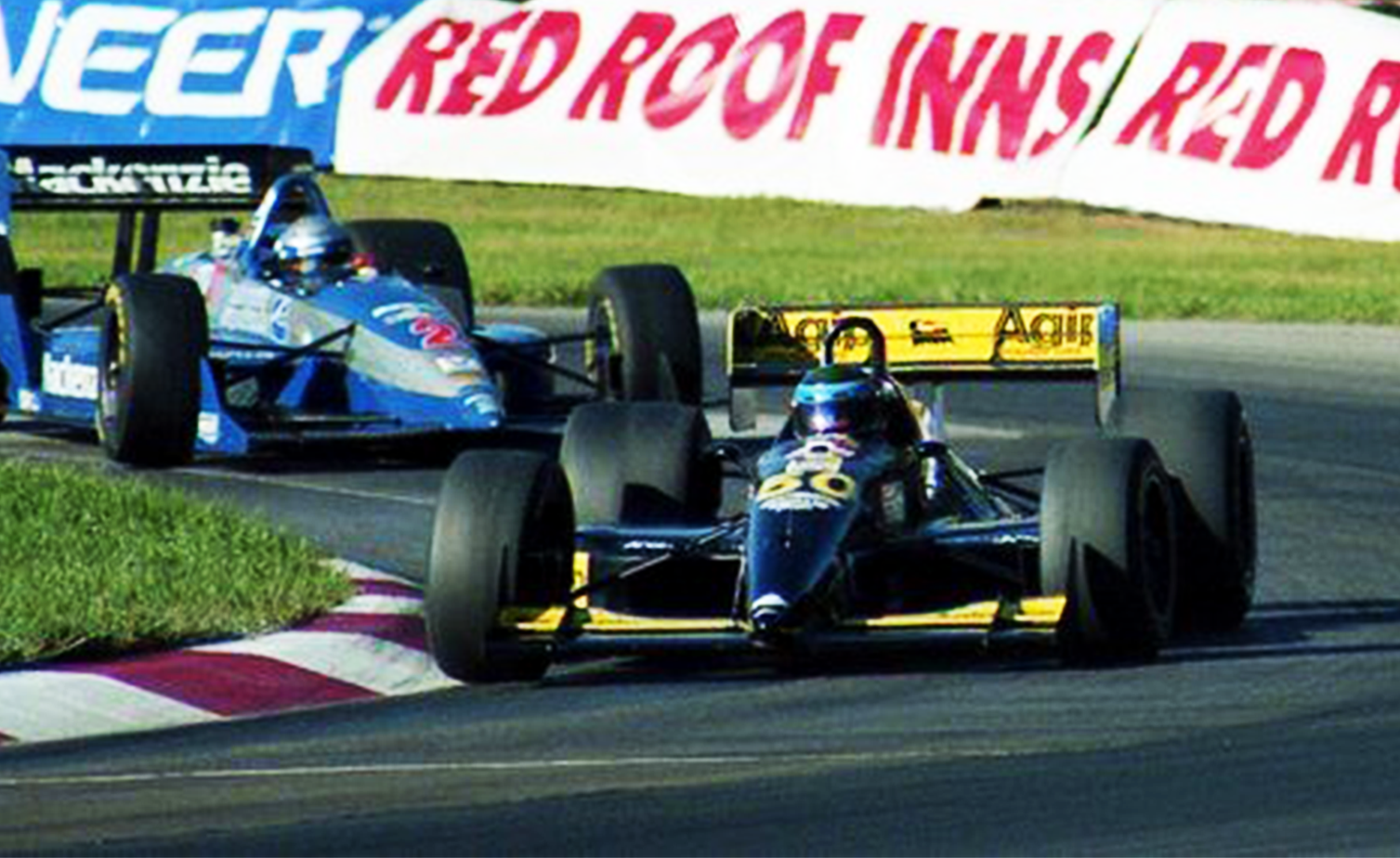
Kudrave driving for Euromotorsport in the 1993 PPG IndyCar World Series

David Kudrave (born March 10, 1966, in Los Angeles), is an American former open wheel racing driver. He raced in the 1993 CART season, with eight career starts. His best finish came in his first race, the Valvoline 200 at Phoenix International Raceway. Kudrave also raced in the 1996 and 1996-1997 Indy Racing League seasons, with three starts. Coincidentally, his best IRL finish was in tenth position in the 1996 Dura Lube 200, also at PIR. Currently, Kudrave is out of racing and is in the real estate brokerage business in Southern California.

== Early life ==
Born and raised in Los Angeles, California, Kudrave and his father would annually journey from their family home to the now defunct Ontario Motor Speedway where they would watch racing legends like Mario Andretti, A.J. Foyt, and others compete. He has described this experience by saying "Those drivers were thrill-seekers and I knew then that I wanted to get into it." This led Kudrave to begin racing at just twelve years old. He attended the Jim Russell British School of Motor Racing at fifteen years old, lying about his age in order to be eligible for the program, but still beating the older attendees in most of the races that he participated in. He began competing in a racing series sponsored by Russell after finishing the program and then moved up to the Formula Ford Circuit, a class generally regarded as the most competitive amateur open-wheel class in the nation. Kudrave also attended the University of Southern California, majoring in Economics.

== Early career ==
In 1985, Kudrave officially became a professional open-wheel race car driver by moving up to the Super Vee Series, which features cars with 200 horsepower engines. Just one year after he entered the series, he finished the season in sixth place. In 1987, he won three races, one pole position, and led for more laps and miles than any other competitor. He finished the series in second, just twenty points behind series champion Scott Atchinson. His worst race finish that year was fourth place, and he was voted the series "Most Improved Driver". That year Kudrave was publicly praised by former Formula One driver Dan Gurney, who said "He's talented, no doubt about it."

== CART ==
=== 1993 season ===
Kudrave made his CART debut in 1993, racing for the Euromotorsport team. His first start was in the Valvoline 200 in Phoenix Arizona. Throughout his first season he had seven starts, with his best finish in eighth place. He finished the season with six points.

=== 1994 season ===
With growing tension and criticism of the CART Series, the 1994 season was plagued by rumors that the series was going to fall apart. Kudrave did not start in any races that year, but would return to racing the following year in the newly-formed Indy Racing League (now called the IndyCar Series).

== IndyCar ==
=== 1996 season ===
Kudrave's return to racing with Tempero-Giuffre Racing started in the Indy 200 at the Walt Disney World Speedway, where he finished in twentieth. This was then followed by a tenth-place finish in Phoenix. In the third round of the season, he was set to race in the Indianapolis 500 at the Indianapolis Motor Speedway, before a complication within his team prevented him from being able to participate in the race. After the third round, Kudrave would not start another race until the following season. He finished the season with eighty points, ranked nineteenth overall.

=== 1996-1997 season ===
Kudrave participated in just one race in the 1996-1997 Season in the Indy 225, which took place at the New Hampshire Motor Speedway. He finished the race in seventeenth place, giving him eighteen points for the season. At the end of the season he was ranked 47th overall. The 1996-1997 Indy Racing League Season would be his final season of his racing career.

== Racing record ==
=== American Open Wheel ===
(key)

==== CART ====
Year	Team	1	2	3	4	5	6	7	8	9	10	11	12	13	14	15	16	Rank	Points	Ref
1993	Euromotorsport	SRF	PHX; 8	LBH; DNS	INDY	MIL; 24	DET	POR; 23	CLE	TOR	MIC; 12	NHA; 23	ROA	VAN	MDO; 23	NAZ; 14	LS	27th	6	
1994	Euromotorsport	SRF; Wth	PHX; DNQ	LBH; DNQ	INDY	MIL	DET	POR	CLE	TOR	MIC	MDO	NHA	VAN	ROA	NAZ	LS	NC	0	

==== IndyCar ====
Year	Team	1	2	3	4	5	6	7	8	9	10	Rank	Points	Ref
1996	Tempero-Giuffre Racing	WDW; 20	PHX; 10	INDY								19th	80	
1996-97	Tempero-Giuffre Racing	NHM; 17	LVS	WDW	PHX	INDY	TXS	PPIR	CLT	NH2	LV2	47th	18	
