= 1993 Champ Car season =

The 1993 Champ Car season may refer to:

- the 1992–93 USAC Championship Car season, which was just one race, the 77th Indianapolis 500
- the 1993 PPG Indy Car World Series, sanctioned by CART, who would later become Champ Car
