= 1993 Molson Indy Toronto =

1993 CART World Series race held at Toronto, Ontario, Canada

(Canada) 1993 Toronto
Race details
- Race 9 of 16 in the 1993 IndyCar season
- Map of the track
- Date: 18 July, 1993
- Official name: 1993 Molson Indy Toronto
- Location: Exhibition Place; Toronto, Canada
- Course: Toronto Street Circuit; 1.780 mi / 2.781 km
- Distance: 103 laps 183.3 mi / 286.4 km
- Weather: Mostly cloudy with temperatures reaching up to 23 °C (73 °F)

Pole position
- Driver: (Brazil) Emerson Fittipaldi (Team Penske)

Podium
- First: (Canada) Paul Tracy (Team Penske)
- Second: (Brazil) Emerson Fittipaldi (Team Penske)
- Third: (United States) Danny Sullivan (Galles Racing)

The 1993 Molson Indy Toronto was the ninth round of the 1993 CART World Series season, held on 18 July 1993 on the Toronto Street Circuit, Toronto, Canada.

== Results ==
Key	Meaning
R	Rookie
W	Past winner

=== Qualifying results ===
Pos	Nat	Name	Team	Car	Qual
1	(Brazil)	Emerson Fittipaldi W	Team Penske	Penske PC-22 Chevrolet	109.998
2	(Canada)	Paul Tracy	Team Penske	Penske PC-22 Chevrolet	109.545
3	(United States)	Bobby Rahal W	Rahal-Hogan Racing	Lola T93/00 Chevrolet	109.331
4	(United States)	Danny Sullivan	Galles Racing	Lola T93/00 Chevrolet	109.287
5	(Sweden)	Stefan Johansson	Bettenhausen Motorsports	Penske PC-22 Chevrolet	109.174
6	(Brazil)	Raul Boesel	Dick Simon Racing	Lola T93/00 FordXB	109.161
7	(United States)	Al Unser Jr. W	Galles Racing	Lola T93/00 Chevrolet	109.034
8	(Netherlands)	Arie Luyendyk	Chip Ganassi Racing	Lola T93/00 Ford XB V8t	109.029
9	(United Kingdom)	Nigel Mansell	Newman-Haas Racing	Lola T93/00 FordXB	108.921
10	(Canada)	Scott Goodyear	Walker Motorsport	Lola T93/00 FordXB	108.670
11	(Italy)	Teo Fabi	Hall/VDS Racing	Lola T93/00 Chevrolet	108.600
12	(United States)	Robby Gordon	A. J. Foyt Enterprises	Lola T93/00 FordXB	108.459
13	(United States)	Mario Andretti	Newman-Haas Racing	Lola T93/00 FordXB	108.204
14	(Colombia)	Roberto Guerrero	Budweiser King Racing	Lola T93/00 Chevrolet	108.006
15	(Luxembourg)	Bertrand Gachot R	Dick Simon Racing	Lola T93/00 FordXB	107.959
16	(Italy)	Andrea Montermini R	Euromotorsport	Lola T92/00 Chevrolet 265A V8t	107.887
17	(United States)	Jimmy Vasser	Hayhoe Racing	Lola T92/00 FordXB	107.555
18	(United States)	Brian Till	Turley Motorsports	Penske PC-21 Chevrolet	107.475
19	(United States)	Scott Brayton	Dick Simon Racing	Lola T93/00 FordXB	107.376
20	(United States)	Scott Pruett	ProFormance Motorsports	Lola T91/00 Chevrolet	106.948
21	(United States)	Willy T. Ribbs	Walker Motorsport	Lola T92/00 FordXB	105.990
22	(United States)	Mark Smith R	Arciero Racing	Penske PC-21 Chevrolet	105.740
23	(United States)	Kevin Cogan	Galles Racing	Lola T92/00 Chevrolet	104.967
24	(Brazil)	Marco Greco R	International Sport	Lola T92/00 Chevrolet	104.461
25	(Japan)	Hiro Matsushita	Walker Racing	Lola T93/00 Ford XB	103.662
26	(Canada)	Ross Bentley	Dale Coyne Racing	Lola T91/00 Chevrolet	103.274
27	(United States)	Johnny Unser R	Dale Coyne Racing	Lola T92/00 Chevrolet	102.167
28	(United States)	Jeff Wood	Euromotorsport	Lola T91/00 Cosworth	101.696

=== Starting grid ===
Row	Inside	Outside
1	(Brazil) 4 – Emerson Fittipaldi W	(Canada) 12 – Paul Tracy
2	(United States) 1 – Bobby Rahal W	(United States) 7 – Danny Sullivan
3		(Brazil) 9 – Raul Boesel
4	(United States) 3 – Al Unser Jr. W	
5		(Canada) 2 – Scott Goodyear
6		(United States) 14 – Robby Gordon
7	(United States) 6 – Mario Andretti	(Colombia) 40 – Roberto Guerrero
8	(Luxembourg) 90 – Bertrand Gachot R	
9	(United States) 18 – Jimmy Vasser	
10
11
12
13
14
15

=== Race results ===
FP	SP	No.	Driver	Qual	C	E	Laps	Status	Team	Pts
1	2	12	(Canada) Paul Tracy	109.545	P	C	103	96.510 mph	Team Penske	21
2	1	4	(Brazil) Emerson Fittipaldi W	109.998	P	C	103	+13.023 seconds	Team Penske	17
3	4	7	(United States) Danny Sullivan	109.287	L	C	103	+14.249 seconds	Galles Racing	14
4	3	1	(United States) Bobby Rahal W	109.331	L	C	103	+14.800 seconds	Rahal-Hogan Racing	12
5	7	3	(United States) Al Unser Jr. W	109.034	L	C	103	+15.350 seconds	Galles Racing	10
6	12	14	(United States) Robby Gordon	108.459	L	F	103	+46.770 seconds	A. J. Foyt Enterprises	8
7	6	9	(Brazil) Raul Boesel	109.161	L	F	103	+47.130 seconds	Dick Simon Racing	6
8	13	6	(United States) Mario Andretti	108.204	L	F	102	Flagged	Newman-Haas Racing	5
9	10	2	(Canada) Scott Goodyear	108.670	L	F	102	Flagged	Walker Motorsport	4
10	14	40	(Colombia) Roberto Guerrero	108.006	L	C	102	Flagged	Budweiser King Racing	3
11	17	18	(United States) Jimmy Vasser	107.555	L	F	101	Flagged	Hayhoe Racing	2
12	15	90	(Luxembourg) Bertrand Gachot R	107.959	L	F	101	Flagged	Dick Simon Racing	1
13
14
15
16
17
18
19
20
21
22
23
24
25
26
27
28
29

*C Chassis: L=Lola, P=Penske

*E Engine: C=Ilmor-Chevrolet, F=Cosworth-Ford

All cars utilized Goodyear tires.

==== Race statistics ====
Lap Leaders
Laps	Leader
1–15	Emerson Fittipaldi
16–38	Paul Tracy
39–72	Emerson Fittipaldi
73–103	Paul Tracy

Total laps led
Laps	Leader
Paul Tracy	54
Emerson Fittipaldi	49

Cautions: 3 for 11 laps
Laps	Reason
6–8	Crash turn 3 – Wood
11–14	Crash turn 1 – Cogan/Greco/Montermini/Ribbs
45–48	Fluid on track – Luyendyk

Notes

- Time of race 1:53:58.00

Point Scoring System:

- Points are awarded based on each driver's resulting place (regardless of whether the car is running at the end of the race):

Position	1	2	3	4	5	6	7	8	9	10	11	12
Points	20	16	14	12	10	8	6	5	4	3	2	1

Bonus Points:

- 1 For Pole Position
- 1 For Leading The Most Laps of the Race

== Media ==
=== Television ===
The race was carried on same day tape delay flag-to-flag coverage in the United States on ABC Sports and live flag-to-flag coverage in Canada on CBC Sports.

ABC
Booth Announcers		Pit reporters
Announcer	Paul Page	Jack Arute; Gary Gerould
Color	Sam Posey; Bobby Unser	Jack Arute; Gary Gerould

=== Radio ===
The race was broadcast on radio by the IMS Radio Network.

Previous race: 1993 Budweiser Grand Prix of Cleveland Presented by Diary Mart	PPG Indy Car World Series; 1993 season	Next race: 1993 Marlboro 500
Previous race: 1992 Molson Indy Toronto	1993 Molson Indy Toronto	Next race: 1994 Molson Indy Toronto
