= Penske PC-22 =

Racing car

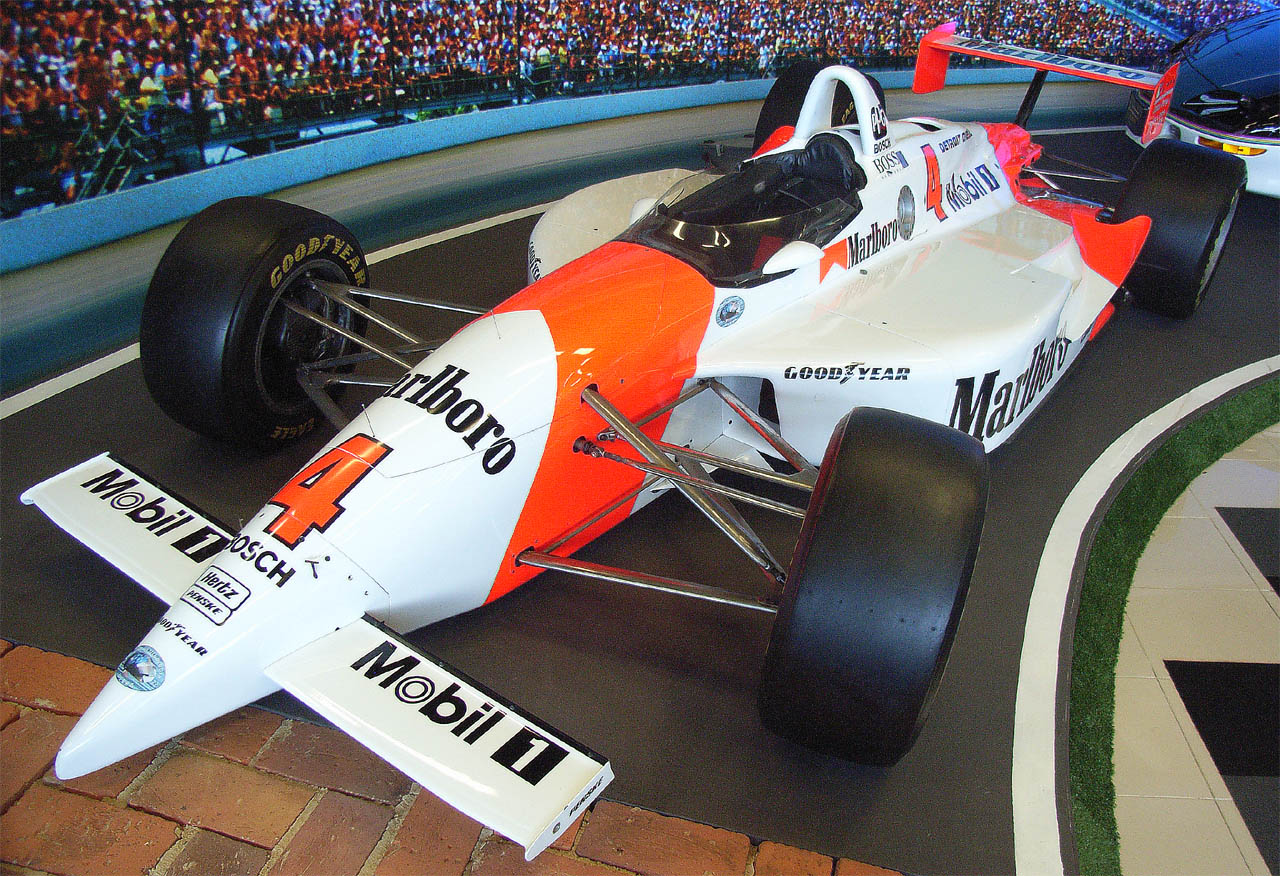
- Category: CART IndyCar
- Constructor: Penske Cars Ltd.
- Designer: Nigel Bennett
- Predecessor: Penske PC-21
- Successor: Penske PC-23

Technical specifications
- Suspension (front): pushrod
- Suspension (rear): pushrod
- Engine: Ilmor-Chevrolet 265C 2,647 cc (161.5 cu in) V8 80° turbocharged Mid-engined, longitudinally mounted
- Transmission: manual
- Fuel: Methanol, supplied by Mobil
- Tires: Goodyear Eagle Speedway Special Radial 25.5in x 9.5in x 15in (front); 27in x 14.5in x 15in (rear)

Competition history
- Notable entrants: Penske Racing
- Notable drivers: 4 Emerson Fittipaldi; 12 Paul Tracy
- Debut: 1993 Australian FAI IndyCar Grand Prix
Races	Wins	Poles
16	8	3

The Penske PC-22 was a CART Penske Racing car which competed in the 1993 season. It raced in all sixteen events, scoring eight wins, three with Emerson Fittipaldi and five with Paul Tracy. The most remarkable success of the PC-22 was the 1993 Indianapolis 500 win by Fittipaldi, placed 2nd at the end of the season, missing the championship by only 8 points. The car was designed by Nigel Bennett as a radical departure from the basic concept of the previous Penske cars.

== Racing history ==
The PC-22 debuted at 1993 Australian FAI IndyCar Grand Prix, qualifying second with Fittipaldi and third with Tracy. In the race, Fittipaldi scored a second place finish, while Tracy retired for electrical problems. Debutant Nigel Mansell won for the Newman-Haas team driving a Lola-Ford. At Phoenix, the first oval race of the season, both Penskes went off, while in Long Beach Tracy scored the first win for the PC-22. In Indianapolis, Fittipaldi qualified ninth (220.150 mph), and won the event exploiting Mansell's inexperience on oval racing and Andretti's handling problems, after their dominating runs. After two races, Milwaukee and Detroit, with only one podium finish, the Penske come back to victory in Portland, with Fittipaldi first and Tracy third. Two 1-2 wins followed, in Cleveland and Toronto, with Tracy first and Fittipaldi second in both occasions. Newman-Haas driver Mansell scored two wins in his Lola chassis at Michigan and New Hampshire as a major push for his championship bid, while Fittipaldi and Tracy at New Hampshire scored a second and third place respectively. Tracy won at Road America and Fittipaldi at Mid-Ohio, but Mansell clinched the title with his fifth season win at Nazareth. Tracy scored a 1st place at the final race of season in Laguna Seca.

== Legacy ==
The highly successful PC-23 that competed in the 1994 IndyCar season. was modeled after its predecessor, the PC-22. The Penske PC-23 was one of the most dominant open-wheel race cars ever developed. It won both the 1994 CART season, and the 1994 Indianapolis 500 with Al Unser Jr., together with Emerson Fittipaldi and Paul Tracy scoring 12 wins out of 16 in total, collecting 10 pole positions and 28 podium finishes, in a season that saw Penske also take the Constructor's Cup, and the Manufacturer's Cup with the Ilmor-Mercedes-Benz engine.

== Complete Indy Car World Series results ==
(key) (Results in bold indicate pole position; results in italics indicate fastest lap)

Year	Team	Engine	Tires	Driver	No.	1	2	3	4	5	6	7	8	9	10	11	12	13	14	15	16	Points	D.C.
1993	Marlboro Team Penske	Chevrolet 265C V8t	G			SFR	PHX	LBH	INDY	MIL	DET	POR	CLE	TOR	MCH	NHA	ROA	VAN	MDO	NAZ	LAG		
1993	Marlboro Team Penske	Chevrolet 265C V8t	G	(Brazil) Emerson Fittipaldi	4	2	14	13	1	3	23	1	2	**2**	13	3	5	7	1	5	**2**	**183**	**2nd**
1993	Marlboro Team Penske	Chevrolet 265C V8t	G	(Canada) Paul Tracy	12	21	16	1	30	20	9	3	**1**	1	19	2	**1**	13	25	3	1	**157**	**3rd**
1993	Bettenhausen Motorsports	Chevrolet 265C V8t	G																				
1993	Bettenhausen Motorsports	Chevrolet 265C V8t	G	(Sweden) Stefan Johansson	16	12	21	26	11	25	20	26	4	24	23	14	21	3	26	7	6	**43**	**13th**
1993	Bettenhausen Motorsports	Chevrolet 265C V8t	G	(United States) Scott Sharp	33																22	**0**	**48th**
1993	Bettenhausen Motorsports	Chevrolet 265C V8t	G	(United States) Tony Bettenhausen Jr.	76				20													**0**	**47th**
1994	Bettenhausen Motorsports	Ilmor 265D V8t	G			SFR	PHX	LBH	INDY	MIL	DET	POR	CLE	TOR	MCH	MDO	NHA	VAN	ROA	NAZ	LAG		
1994	Bettenhausen Motorsports	Ilmor 265D V8t	G	(Sweden) Stefan Johansson	16	5	4	10	15	26	22	8	5	14	14	12	23	26	8	5	12	**57**	**11th**
1994	Bettenhausen Motorsports	Ilmor 265C V8t	G	(United States) Gary Bettenhausen	61				DNQ													-	NC
1994	Bettenhausen Motorsports	Ilmor 265D V8t; Ilmor 265C V8t	G	(Australia) Gary Brabham	76	24																**0**	**51st**
1994	Bettenhausen Motorsports	Ilmor 265D V8t; Ilmor 265C V8t	G	(United States) Robbie Groff	76			13				13										**0**	**34th**
1994	Rahal-Hogan Racing	Ilmor 265D V8t	G	(United States) Bobby Rahal	4				3													**59***	**10th***
1994	Rahal-Hogan Racing	Ilmor 265C V8t	G	(United States) Mike Groff	10				31													**17***	**20th***

*Includes points scored by other cars.
