= Kevin Cogan =

American racing driver (born 1956)

- Cogan's 1974 yearbook photo at West Torrance High School
- Born: John Kevin Cogan; March 31, 1956 (age 70); Culver City, California, U.S.

Champ Car career
- 116 races run over 12 years
- Years active: 1981–1991, 1993
- Teams: Jerry O'Connell Racing (1981); Team Penske (1982); Bignotti-Carter Racing (1983); Curb Racing (1984); All American Racers (1984); Curb-All American Racers (1984); Forsythe Racing (1984); Kraco Racing (1985); Patrick Racing (1986–1987); Machinist Union Racing (1988–1989); Vince Granatelli Racing (1990); Stoops Racing (1990); Team Menard (1991); Galles-Kraco Racing (1993)
- Best finish: 6th - 1982, 1986
- First race: 1981 Gould Rex Mays Classic (Milwaukee)
- Last race: 1993 Molson Indy Toronto (Exhibition Place)
- First win: 1986 Dana 200 for Special Olympics (Phoenix)
- Last win: 1986 Dana 200 for Special Olympics (Phoenix)
Wins	Podiums	Poles
1	7	3

Formula One World Championship career
- Active years: 1980 – 1981
- Team(s): RAM, Tyrrell
- Entries: 2 (0 starts)
- Championships: 0
- Wins: 0
- Podiums: 0
- Career points: 0
- Pole positions: 0
- Fastest laps: 0
- First entry: 1980 Canadian Grand Prix
- Last entry: 1981 United States Grand Prix West

John Kevin Cogan (born March 31, 1956) is an American former race car driver who drove in Formula One from 1980 to 1981. Driving a RAM Williams in the 1980 Canadian Grand Prix, he failed to qualify, suffering the same result driving for Tyrrell at the 1981 United States Grand Prix West. He then moved over to Indycars in 1982 but his career was cut short by a series of accidents.

Cogan had one Indycar win to his credit (Phoenix in 1986), and finished second at the 1986 Indianapolis 500.

== Early life ==
John Kevin Cogan was born on March 31, 1956 in Culver City, California. He graduated from West Torrance High School in 1974.

== Early career ==
Cogan made his Indycar debut at the 1981 Indianapolis 500, driving the No. 32 Sugaripe Prunes Phoenix PR-01-Cosworth DFX for Jerry O'Connell Racing, as part of the USAC Gold Crown Championship. Cogan qualified in 12th place and finished the race in fourth place with 197 laps completed. Despite this Cogan lost the Rookie of the Year Award to Josele Garza. Cogan then competed in the rival CART/PPG World Series for O'Connell. In his debut, the Gould Rex Mays Classic at the Milwaukee Mile, Cogan qualified in seventh place and finished in second. After the race, he was ranked fifth in points. Cogan participated in four more races that season with his best finish coming at the Los Angeles Times 500 at Riverside International Raceway. Cogan finished his first CART season 23rd in points.

In 1982, Cogan joined Team Penske to drive the No. 4 Norton Spirit Penske PC-10-Cosworth DFX. At the season-opening Kraco Car Stereos 150 at Phoenix International Raceway, he qualified and finished in third place. The remainder of his season was inconsistent, highlighted by a second-place finish at the Domino's Pizza Pocono 500 at Pocono International Raceway to teammate Rick Mears. Cogan also had two pole positions at the Budweiser Cleveland 500 at Burke Lakefront Airport and the AirCal 500 at Riverside International Raceway. He finished the season sixth in points while Mears won the championship. Penske released Cogan at the end of the season.

== 1982 Indianapolis 500 controversy ==
During qualifying, Cogan set a new one-lap track record of 204.638 mph (329.333 km/h) and a record four-lap average of 204.082 mph (328.438 km/h). He was beaten only by his teammate, Mears.

Cogan started from the middle of the front row, next to pole-sitter Mears, and A. J. Foyt. As the field approached the start-finish line to start the race, Cogan suddenly swerved right, touching and bouncing off Foyt's car, and directly into the path of and collecting Mario Andretti. The cars of Dale Whittington and Roger Mears, deeper in the field, were also damaged due to the field checking up. Bobby Rahal also reported getting hit from behind, but was undamaged. The race was immediately red-flagged.

Cogan's shocking accident took out four cars, including himself and Andretti. Foyt's team was able to make repairs and pushed his car out for the restart attempt. Meanwhile, Andretti and Foyt were furious and outspoken about their displeasure with Cogan. Andretti shunned Cogan's attempts to explain himself with a light shove.

Andretti on live radio and television said, "This is what happens when you have children doing a man's job up front." Back in the garage area, Andretti complained about Cogan's abilities, claiming that Cogan was "looking for trouble", that he "couldn't handle the responsibilities of the front row" and that the Penske car he was driving was "too good for him".

The commonly outspoken Foyt also chimed in during comments to ABC's Chris Economaki with, "...he ran right square into my goddamned left front...'Coogin'." Later, Foyt said back in the garage area, of the crash and of Cogan that "It was a stupid deal. The guy had his head up his ass."

Gordon Johncock, Johnny Rutherford and Bobby Unser later placed some blame for the accident on the polesitter Rick Mears, for bringing the field down at such a slow pace. Johncock, who went on to win the 1982 race, pointed out that Andretti had jumped the start, and could have avoided the spinning car of Cogan had he been lined up properly in the second row. Foyt wrote a memoir of his career in 1983 and when mentioning the crash, in a more analytic form, assigned some blame on Mears for the slow start, while assigning Cogan the rest of the responsibility.

At the end of the USAC Gold Crown season, Cogan finished 47th in points. The reason was that Cogan ran the 1981 race without a USAC Class I license and received no points for his 4th-place finish.

=== Aftermath ===
Cogan quickly fell out of favor following the humiliation stemming from the accident. It was followed by a noticeable "blacklisting" by fans and press. Cogan nearly had the dubious distinction of taking out two of the most famous American auto racing legends (Foyt and Andretti) in one move in the biggest race of the season. The incident also further rehashed a standing feud between Team Penske and Patrick Racing. A year earlier, Penske and Patrick were the key fixtures in the controversial 1981 race. In a post-wreck interview, Penske stood behind Cogan, although he also refused to confirm nor deny the broken CV-joint believed to be responsible. As a result, Cogan faced a firestorm of controversy that impacted the remainder of his career.

Cogan never managed to win a race in 1982, and was possibly fired by Roger Penske because of it and replaced by Al Unser in 1983.

The accident was never explained by the Penske team, however, several experts had differing opinions. Rodger Ward, working for the IMS Radio Network immediately believed the rear brakes locked up. It was a common practice for drivers in the turbocharged era to "ride the brakes" during warm up laps in order to engage the turbocharger. Others theorized it may have happened due to a broken CV joint. Some feel that Sam Posey on ABC-TV inadvertently may have added to the controversy when he proclaimed "absolutely no idea" to the question of how it could have happened, and saying "it was as if he turned the wheel intentionally." The comments led many to conclude that the accident may have been entirely of Cogan's doing. As soon as he climbed from the car, Cogan was observed looking at the rear end axle, suggesting that he thought something broke.

== Indycar racing career ==
In 1983, Cogan began driving for Bignotti-Cotter Racing in the No. 6 Master Mechanic/Caesars Palace March 83C-Cosworth DFX (numbered 16 at Indianapolis only). During the season, results were hard to come by for Cogan with his best finish being a fifth place at the Indianapolis 500 where teammate Tom Sneva won. Helping neither Cogan nor Sneva was that Bignotti-Cotter began to develop the Theodore 83 rather than continue to use the proven March 83C. At the end of the season Cogan finished 15th in the CART standings and sixth in the USAC standings. At year's end, team co-owner George Bignotti retired and sold his share of the operation to co-owner Dan Cotter, who did not retain Cogan for 1984.

For 1984, Cogan was originally going to drive the No. 98 Dubonnet/Curb Records Ligier LC02-Cosworth DFX for Curb Racing and the No. 98 Dubonnet Eagle 84SB-Pontiac V8 for All American Racers each in select races. At the season-opening Toyota Grand Prix of Long Beach on the Streets of Long Beach Cogan would start 21st and finish in 28th place in the Ligier. At the Dana Jimmy Bryan 150 at Phoenix International Raceway Cogan would finish in 8th place aboard the Eagle. Then at the Indianapolis 500, Cogan returned to the Ligier. The car was off the pace at the beginning of practice and Cogan faced the possibility of failing to qualify. Cogan would eventually qualify for the race after Ligier and Curb parted ways, and when Michael Chandler suffered career-ending injuries in the Eagle. During this time Mike Curb and Dan Gurney merged their teams to form Curb-All American Racers. In the race Cogan qualified in 27th place, setting a new speed record for stock block engines at Indianapolis. In the race, Cogan retired to 20th place after suffering a frozen wheel after 137 laps. Cogan would leave Curb-All American Racers after the Budweiser Cleveland Grand Prix at Burke Lakefront Airport. Cogan would then start driving for Forsythe Racing in the No. 33 Skoal Bandit March 84C-Cosworth DFX. Initially results were good as Cogan was able to start fifth and finish eighth in his debut for the team at the Michigan 500 at Michigan International Speedway and would follow it up with a tenth-place finish at the Provimi Veal 200 at Road America. During practice for the Domino's Pizza 500 at Pocono International Raceway, Cogan crashed in turn two. The force of the frontal impact caused broken heels in both feet, a torn Achilles tendon on his left foot, and a shattered talus bone on his right foot. The injuries ended Cogan's season and he finished 24th in points.

In 1985, Cogan would begin to drive for Kraco Racing in the No. 18 Kraco Car Stereo/Wolff Systems March 85C-Cosworth DFX. The season had its ups and downs such as Cogan nearly failing to qualify for the Indianapolis 500, eventually starting in 32nd place and finishing 11th. Cogan would also get a fourth-place finish at the Detroit News 200 at Michigan International Speedway and a 5th-place finish at the Stroh's/G.I. Joe's 200 at Portland International Raceway to get a 14th-place finish in points.

For 1986, Cogan joined Patrick Racing to drive the No. 7 7-Eleven March 86C-Cosworth DFX. At the season opening Dana 200 for Special Olympics at Phoenix International Raceway Cogan scored his first Indycar win, leading 2nd place Tom Sneva by a lap. It was also the first time Cogan led the CART standings in his career. With 13 laps to go in the Indianapolis 500, Cogan made a bold move to pass Rick Mears and Bobby Rahal in less than a lap when both were held up by the slower car of Randy Lanier. Despite his car conspicuously oversteering in the turns, Cogan pulled away to a three-second lead before a caution came out on lap 195 for a crash by Arie Luyendyk in turn four. Cogan did not get a good restart on lap 198 and was passed by Rahal, eventually finishing in second place. Cogan still led the standings after Indianapolis but suffered retirements in seven of the fourteen remaining races and fell to sixth in the championship.

Cogan at the Indianapolis 500 in 1987

For 1987, Cogan would return with Patrick, making it the first team Cogan drove for in consecutive years, driving the No. 7 Marlboro March 87C-Ilmor-Chevrolet Indy V8 265A. The season would turn out to be a disappointment as Cogan got a best finish of fifth at the Escort Radar Warning 200 at Mid-Ohio Sports Car Course and the Bosch Spark Plug Grand Prix at Nazareth Speedway to get a 16th-place finish in points.

In 1988, Cogan would begin to drive for Machinists Union Racing in the No. 11 Schaefer Beer/Playboy Fashions March 88C-Cosworth DFX (although an 87C was used at the Miller High Life 200 at the Milwaukee Mile). The season started off well as Cogan got a third-place finish at the Toyota Grand Prix of Long Beach on the Streets of Long Beach. After seven rounds, Cogan was ranked 11th in points when he was injured while competing at the Molson Indy Toronto at Exhibition Place. Cogan would miss four races but would still finish 13th in points on the strength of a fourth-place finish at the Nissan Indy Challenge at Tamiami Park.

For 1989, Cogan returned with the Machinists Union driving the No. 11 Schaefer Beer/Playboy Fashions March 88C-Cosworth DFX. Another frustrating season saw Cogan finish 14th in points with a best finish of eighth at the Champion Spark Plug 300K at Laguna Seca Raceway. The only 'highlight' of Cogan's season was a major crash at the Indianapolis 500. At the end of the third lap, Cogan spun in turn four and hit the entrance to the pit lane. The car broke in half, rebounded and slammed into the end of the pit wall before finally sliding to a stop on its side in the pit lane. To everyone's surprise, Cogan immediately climbed from his destroyed car unharmed.

In 1990, Cogan could only get a drive for Indianapolis for Vince Granatelli Racing in the No. 11 Tuneup Masters Penske PC18-Buick V6. In the race, Cogan qualified in 15th place and finished in ninth place. Cogan would later get a second race at the Marlboro 500 at Michigan International Speedway for Stoops Racing in the No. 17 Conseco Lola T9000-Cosworth DFS starting 13th and finishing 20th. Cogan would finish out the season 23rd in points.

In 1991, Cogan would join Team Menard to drive the No. 9 Glidden/Menards Lola T9100-Buick V6 at the Indianapolis 500. During qualifying, Cogan was unable to make an attempt due to rain and would have to wait for the second day. Cogan would easily qualify for the race in 16th place with a speed that would have placed him easily in the top0ten along with other drivers, such as teammate Gary Bettenhausen, Arie Luyendyk, Emerson Fittipaldi and Stan Fox. In the race, Cogan was involved in a crash with Roberto Guerrero on lap 25. Cogan suffered serious injuries with his right femur broken near the hip in four lengthwise pieces, requiring seven and a half hours of surgery. He also suffered a broken right forearm and shoulder.

Original television footage was inconclusive, and Cogan firmly assessed the blame on Guerrero, claiming that Guerrero cut down on him. An amateur home video shot from the grandstands surfaced, however, which showed that Cogan may have moved up into Guerrero. At the very least, the video showed that it may have been a simple racing accident, although Cogan still holds Guerrero responsible. As a result of the crash Cogan missed the remainder of the year (Menard wasn't going to do anymore races) and the next year. Cogan scored no points during the season.

For 1993, Cogan would drive for Galles-Kraco Racing in the No. 11 Conseco Lola T9300-Ilmor-Chevrolet Indy V8 265A in a part-time schedule. At Cogan's debut for the year, the Indianapolis 500 Cogan was on the bubble on Bump Day and was nearly bumped by Bobby Rahal. Rahal was not successful and Cogan started in 14th place and would lead for four laps during pit stops, eventually finishing in 14th place. Cogan would drive in three more races for Galles-Kraco, getting a best finish of 13th at the Budweiser Grand Prix of Cleveland at Burke Lakefront Airport. Cogan would again score no points towards the championship.

Cogan would retire from racing at the end of 1993 with sixth place in 1982 and 1986 being his best finish in the CART standings and his win at Phoenix in 1986 being his only win.

== Personal life ==
Since leaving IndyCar, Cogan has distanced himself from racing (which includes not watching the races), stating that any interest in the sport died with Scott Brayton in 1996. Instead, he concentrated on a real estate business in Los Angeles in Palos Verdes Estates. Cogan declined invitations to be interviewed for the centennial era of the Indianapolis Motor Speedway in 2009 in which many IndyCar legends and IndyCar drivers were interviewed by ESPN. Cogan also refused invitations to participate in Indianapolis 500 festivities during the 100th anniversary of the race in 2011. He granted a rare interview in 2015 about his life, noting that he has lingering pain from the crashes he suffered in racing (foot, shoulder, and forearm), which include shaky balance.

In 1988, ESPN reporter Jack Arute reported that Cogan was married, to Tracy, and had a son. The couple has since been divorced since 2004. In the 2015 interview with Curt Cavin, it was revealed that Cogan has two more children, a daughter and a son, since his retirement.

He won Best of Show at the 2019 Las Vegas Concours d'Elegance.

== Racing record ==
=== SCCA National Championship Runoffs ===
Year	Track	Car	Engine	Class	Finish	Start	Status
1977	Road Atlanta	Ralt RT1	Ford	Formula B	1	1	Running

=== Complete USAC Mini-Indy Series results ===
Year	Entrant	1	2	3	4	5	6	7	8	9	10	Pos	Points
1978	Ralt American Ltd.	PIR1	TRE1	MOS	MIL1	TEX	MIL2; 3	OMS1	OMS2	TRE2	PIR2; 1	11th	340

=== Complete Formula One World Championship results ===
(key)

Year	Entrant	Chassis	Engine	1	2	3	4	5	6	7	8	9	10	11	12	13	14	15	WDC	Points
1980	RAM / Rainbow Jeans Racing	Williams FW07B	Cosworth V8	ARG	BRA	RSA	USW	BEL	MON	FRA	GBR	GER	AUT	NED	ITA	CAN; DNQ	USA		NC	0
1981	Tyrrell Racing	Tyrrell 010	Cosworth V8	USW; DNQ	BRA	ARG	SMR	BEL	MON	ESP	FRA	GBR	GER	AUT	NED	ITA	CAN	CPL	NC	0

=== American open-wheel racing ===
(key)

==== CART ====
Year	Team	No.	1	2	3	4	5	6	7	8	9	10	11	12	13	14	15	16	17	Rank	Points	Ref
1981	Jerry O'Connell Racing	32	PHX	MIL; 2	ATL1; 16	ATL2	MIS; 28	RIV; 11	MIL2; 23	MIS2	WGL	MEX	PHX2							23rd	23	
1982	Team Penske	4	PHX; 3	ATL; 18	MIL; 5	CLE; 10	MIS; 14	MIL2; 5	POC; 2	RIV; 10	ROA; 25	MIS2; 22	PHX2; 4							6th	136	
1983	Bignotti-Cotter Racing	6	ATL; 15	INDY; 5	MIL; 20	CLE; 25	MIS; 27	ROA; 19	POC; 15	RIV; 21	MOH; 6	MIS2; 20	CEA; 16	LS; 22	PHX; 6					15th	26	
1984	Curb Racing	98	LBH; 28		INDY; 20															24th	17	
1984	All American Racers	88		PHX; 8																24th	17	
1984	Curb-All American Racers	98			INDY; 20	MIL; 9	POR; 18	MEA; 20	CLE; 22											24th	17	
1984	Forsythe Racing	33								MIS; 8	ROA; 10	POC; Wth	MOH; Inj	SAN; Inj	MIS2; Inj	PHX2; Inj	LS; Inj	CEA; Inj		24th	17	
1985	Kraco Racing	18	LBH; 23	INDY; 11	MIL; 16	POR; 5	MEA; 7	CLE; 9	MIS; 7	ROA; 25	POC; 17	MOH; 21	SAN; 9	MIS2; 4	LS; 17	PHX; 22	MIA; 24			14th	44	
1986	Patrick Racing	7	PHX; 1	LBH; 17	INDY; 2	MIL; 12	POR; 14	MEA; 21	CLE; 23	TOR; 5	MIS; 22	POC; 2	MOH; 4	SAN; 4	MIS2; 4	ROA; 20	LS; 9	PHX2; 14	MIA; 4	6th	115	
1987	Patrick Racing	7	LBH; 18	PHX; 21	INDY; 31	MIL; 18	POR	MEA; 12	CLE; 21	TOR; 13	MIS; 27	POC; 9	ROA; 19	MOH; 5	NAZ; 5	LS; 18	MIA; 21			16th	25	
1988	Machinists Union Racing	11	PHX; 8	LBH; 3	INDY; 11	MIL; 22	POR; 20	CLE; 10	TOR; 24	MEA; Inj	MIS; Inj	POC; Inj	MOH; Inj	ROA; 24	NAZ; 15	LS; 9	MIA; 4			13th	40	
1989	Machinists Union Racing	11	PHX; 10	LBH; 26	INDY; 32	MIL; 19	DET; 17	POR; 24	CLE; 11	MEA; 12	TOR; 9	MIS; 25	POC; 22	MOH; 10	ROA; 18	NAZ	LS; 8			14th	18	
1990	Vince Granatelli Racing	11	PHX	LBH	INDY; 9	MIL	DET	POR	CLE	MEA	TOR									23rd	4	
1990	Stoops Racing	17										MIS; 20	DEN	VAN	MOH	ROA	NAZ	LS		23rd	4	
1991	Team Menard	9	SRF	LBH	PHX	INDY; 29	MIL; Inj	DET; Inj	POR; Inj	CLE; Inj	MEA; Inj	TOR; Inj	MIS; Inj	DEN; Inj	VAN; Inj	MOH; Inj	ROA; Inj	NAZ; Inj	LS; Inj	51st	0	
1993	Galles-Kraco Racing	11	SRF	PHX	LBH	INDY; 14	MIL	DET	POR; 27	CLE; 13	TOR; 15	MIS	NHM	ROA	VAN	MOH	NAZ	LS		35th	0	

==== Indianapolis 500 ====
Year	Chassis	Engine	Start	Finish	Entrant
1981	Phoenix PR-01	Cosworth DFX	12	4	Jerry O'Connell Racing
1982	Penske PC-10	Cosworth DFX	2	30	Team Penske
1983	March 83C	Cosworth DFX	22	5	Bignotti-Cotter Racing
1984	Eagle 84SB	Pontiac V8	27	20	Curb-All American Racers
1985	March 85C	Cosworth DFX	32	11	Kraco Racing
1986	March 86C	Cosworth DFX	6	2	Patrick Racing
1987	March 87C	Ilmor-Chevrolet Indy V8 265A	24	31	Patrick Racing
1988	March 88C	Cosworth DFX	13	11	Machinist Union Racing
1989	March 88C	Cosworth DFX	27	32	Machinist Union Racing
1990	Penske PC-18	Buick V6	15	9	Vince Granatelli Racing
1991	Lola T91/00	Buick V6	16	29	Team Menard
1993	Lola T93/00	Ilmor-Chevrolet Indy V8 265A	14	14	Galles-Kraco Racing

=== 24 Hours of Le Mans ===
Year	Team	Co-Drivers	Car	Class	Laps	Pos.	Class Pos.
1988	(United States) Silk Cut Jaguar	(Republic of Ireland) Derek Daly (Australia) Larry Perkins	Jaguar XJR-9LM	C1	383	4th	4th
