= 1993 PPG Indy Car World Series =

American motorsport season

1993 CART season
- PPG Indy Car World Series
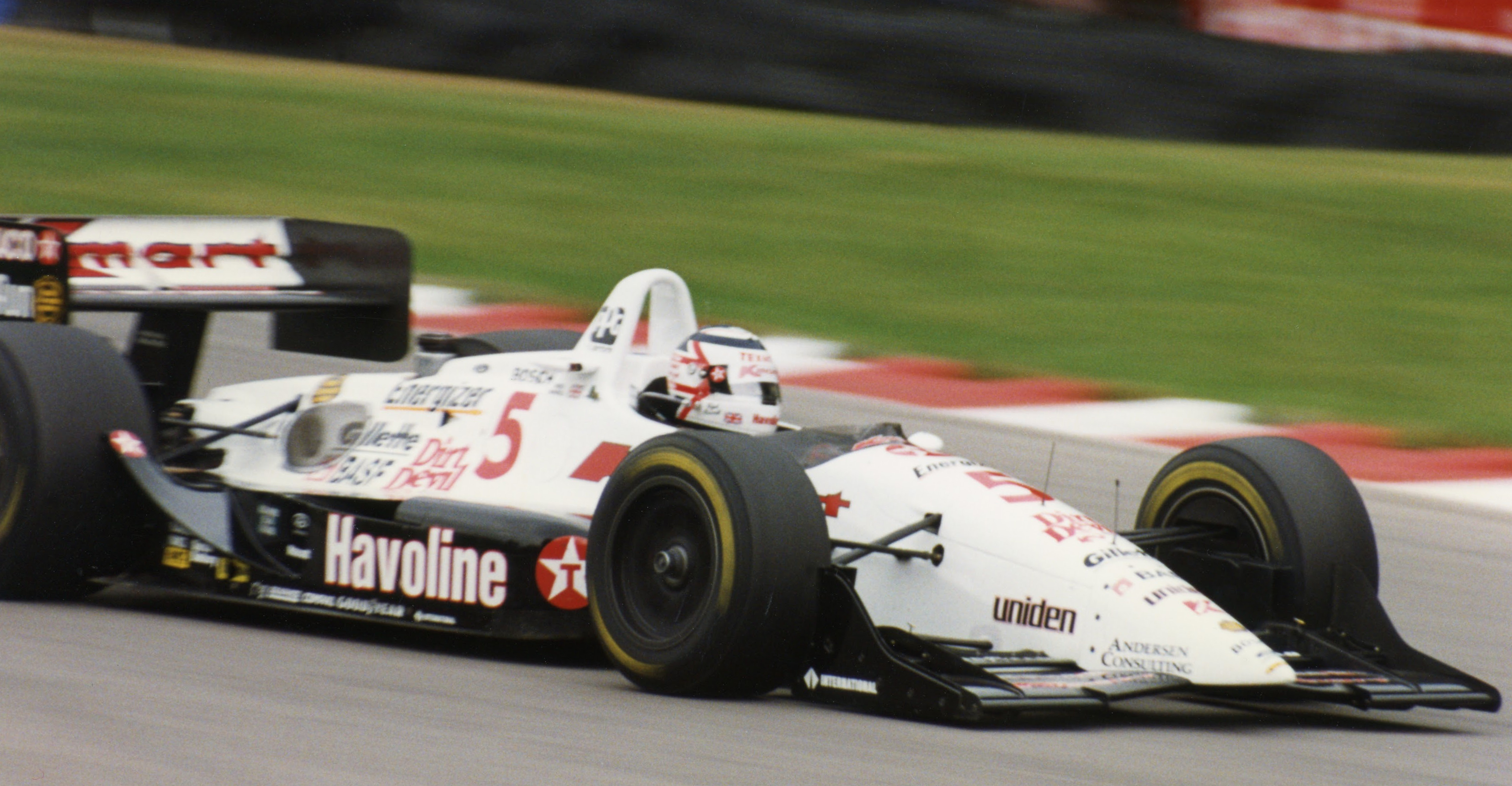
- Nigel Mansell

Season
- Races: 16
- Start date: March 21
- End date: October 3

Awards
- Drivers' champion: (United Kingdom) Nigel Mansell
- Constructors' Cup: (United Kingdom) Lola
- Manufacturers' Cup: (United States) Chevrolet
- Nations' Cup: Brazil
- Rookie of the Year: (United Kingdom) Nigel Mansell
- Indianapolis 500 winner: (Brazil) Emerson Fittipaldi

The 1993 PPG Indy Car World Series season was the 15th national championship season of American open wheel racing sanctioned by CART under the name "IndyCar". The season consisted of 16 races. Nigel Mansell was the national champion as well as the Rookie of the Year. The 1993 Indianapolis 500 was sanctioned by USAC, but counted towards the CART points championship. Emerson Fittipaldi won the Indy 500, his second career victory in that event.

The biggest story going into the season involved Newman/Haas Racing. Nigel Mansell, the reigning Formula One World Champion switched from Formula One to the CART IndyCar Series. Mansell joined Newman/Haas Racing as teammate to Mario Andretti, taking the seat formerly held by Michael Andretti, who departed for one year to McLaren. Mansell came to the American open wheel series with considerable fanfare and huge media attention. He won the season-opener at Surfers Paradise, the first CART "rookie" to win his first start. At Phoenix, Mansell crashed during practice and was forced to sit out the race due to a back injury. At Indianapolis, he was leading the race with 16 laps to go when he was passed on a restart by Emerson Fittipaldi and Arie Luyendyk, and wound up third. He still won the Indy 500 Rookie of the Year award.

Despite having missed the race at Phoenix, Mansell won five races (four of which were on ovals) en route to the CART championship, becoming the first driver to win the CART Series in his rookie season. He also became the first driver in history to be the Formula One champion and the CART IndyCar champion at the same time. (Note: Mansell's victory at the Bosch Spark Plug Grand Prix on September 19 clinched the Indy Car World Series title. Seven days later, Alain Prost succeeded Mansell as Formula One World Champion following his second place finish in the Portuguese Grand Prix. As a result, Mansell held both titles simultaneously for one week.) His team Newman/Haas Racing would still manage to win the one oval race Mansell missed with Mario Andretti scoring his 52nd and final victory of his IndyCar career at Phoenix, Andretti would finish 6th in the final championship standings.

After winning his third CART championship in 1992, Bobby Rahal entered the 1993 season driving the R/H chassis (formerly the Truesports chassis). He finished second at Long Beach, but struggled to get his car up to speed, and failed to qualify at Indianapolis. He would run the remainder of the season with a 1993 Lola chassis, but with no victories. He did however finish 4th in points.

The 1993 schedule originally included plans for the Meadowlands Grand Prix to move to a street circuit in Manhattan on the roads surrounding the World Trade Center and West Street. The race was planned to be held on July 13, 1993. However, the race was cancelled in September 1992 due to cost and conflicts between sponsor Marlboro and Mayor David Dinkins' anti-tobacco advertising policies.

== Drivers and constructors ==
- All teams competed with Goodyear tires.

| Team | Chassis | Engine | No. | Driver(s) | Status | Round(s) | Ref(s) |
|---|---|---|---|---|---|---|---|
| Arciero Racing | Penske PC-21 | Chevrolet V8/B | 25 | (United States) Mark Smith | R | 1–4, 6–9, 12–16 | |
| A. J. Foyt Enterprises | Lola T93/00; Lola T92/00 (Note: Used by Robby Gordon at rounds 1–2, 10, 13 and 16) | Ford XB | 14 | (United States) A. J. Foyt | | 4 | |
| A. J. Foyt Enterprises | Lola T93/00; Lola T92/00 | Ford XB | 14 | (United States) Robby Gordon | | 1–3, 5–16 | |
| A. J. Foyt Enterprises | Lola T93/00; Lola T92/00 | Ford XB | 41 | (United States) Robby Gordon | | 4 | |
| A. J. Foyt Enterprises | Lola T92/00 | Ford XB | 84 | (United States) John Andretti | | 4 | |
| Bettenhausen Motorsports | Penske PC-22 | Chevrolet V8/C | 16 | (Sweden) Stefan Johansson | | All | |
| Bettenhausen Motorsports | Penske PC-22 | Chevrolet V8/C | 33 | (United States) Scott Sharp | R | 16 | |
| Bettenhausen Motorsports | Penske PC-22 | Chevrolet V8/C | 76 | (United States) Tony Bettenhausen Jr. | | 4 | |
| Burns Motor Sports | Galmer G92/B | Chevrolet V8/A | 66 | (United States) Dominic Dobson | | 4 | |
| PacWest Racing | Galmer G92/B | Chevrolet V8/A | 17 | (United States) Dominic Dobson | | 13–14, 16 | |
| Chip Ganassi Racing | Lola T93/00 | Ford XB | 10 | (Netherlands) Arie Luyendyk | | All | |
| Dale Coyne Racing | Lola T92/00; Lola T91/00 (Note: Used by Robbie Buhl at round 5.) | Chevrolet V8/A; Buick (Note: Used at round 4 (Indianapolis 500). Robbie Buhl switched from a Chevrolet V8/A to the Buick after a crash, and Ross Bentley switched from the Buick to a Chevrolet V8/A after multiple engine failures.) | 19 | (United States) Robbie Buhl | R | 1–6, 8, 12, 14–16 | |
| Dale Coyne Racing | Lola T92/00; Lola T91/00 | Chevrolet V8/A; Buick | 19 | (United States) Johnny Unser | R | 7, 9, 11, 13 | |
| Dale Coyne Racing | Lola T92/00; Lola T91/00 | Chevrolet V8/A; Buick | 32 | (Belgium) Éric Bachelart | | 4 | |
| Dale Coyne Racing | Lola T92/00; Lola T91/00 | Chevrolet V8/A; Buick | 39 | (Canada) Ross Bentley | | 1–10, 12–16 | |
| D. B. Mann Motorsports | Lola T91/00 | Buick | 93 | (United States) John Paul Jr. | | 4 | |
| Dick Simon Racing | Lola T93/00 | Ford XB | 9 | (Brazil) Raul Boesel | | All | |
| Dick Simon Racing | Lola T93/00 | Ford XB | 22 | (United States) Scott Brayton | | 3–5, 7–16 | |
| Dick Simon Racing | Lola T92/00 | Ford XB | 22 | (United States) Scott Brayton | | 1–2, 6 | |
| Dick Simon Racing | Lola T92/00 | Ford XB | 23 | (Belgium) Didier Theys | | 16 | |
| Dick Simon Racing | Lola T92/00 | Chevrolet V8/A | 90 | (Australia) Gary Brabham | R | 1 | |
| Dick Simon Racing | Lola T92/00 | Ford XB | 90 | (United States) Lyn St. James | R | 2–3 | |
| Dick Simon Racing | Lola T93/00 | Ford XB | 90 | (United States) Lyn St. James | R | 4, 6–8, 10 | |
| Dick Simon Racing | Lola T93/00 | Ford XB | 90 | (France) Bertrand Gachot | R | 9 | |
| Dick Simon Racing | Lola T93/00 | Ford XB | 90 | (United States) Eddie Cheever | | 12 | |
| Dick Simon Racing | Lola T93/00 | Ford XB | 90 | (Brazil) Maurício Gugelmin | R | 14, 16 | |
| Hayhoe-Simon Racing | Lola T93/00 | Ford XB | 18 | (Brazil) Maurício Gugelmin | R | 15 | |
| Hayhoe-Simon Racing | Lola T92/00 | Ford XB | 18 | (United States) Jimmy Vasser | | 4, 9, 11, 13–14, 16 | |
| Hayhoe-Simon Racing | Lola T92/00 | Chevrolet V8/A | 18 | (United States) Jimmy Vasser | | 1–3, 5–7 | |
| Hayhoe-Simon Racing | Lola T92/00 | Chevrolet V8/A | 18T | (France) Olivier Grouillard | R | 4 | |
| Formula Project | Lola T92/00 | Buick | 36 | (France) Stéphan Grégoire | R | 4 | |
| Euromotorsport Racing | Lola T91/00 | Cosworth | 42 | (Switzerland) Andrea Chiesa | R | 1 | |
| Euromotorsport Racing | Lola T91/00 | Cosworth | 42 | (United States) Jeff Wood | | 2–3, 5–16 | |
| Euromotorsport Racing | Lola T92/00 | Chevrolet V8/A | 50 | (Italy) Andrea Montermini | R | 1, 6, 9, 13 | |
| Euromotorsport Racing | Lola T92/00 | Chevrolet V8/A | 50 | (United States) David Kudrave | R | 2–3, 5, 7, 10–11, 14–15 | |
| Euromotorsport Racing | Lola T92/00 | Chevrolet V8/A | 50 | (United States) Davy Jones | | 4 | |
| Euromotorsport Racing | Lola T92/00 | Chevrolet V8/A | 50 | (Germany) Christian Danner | | 8, 12, 16 | |
| Galles Racing | Lola T93/00 | Chevrolet V8/C | 3 | (United States) Al Unser Jr. | | All | |
| Galles Racing | Lola T93/00 | Chevrolet V8/C | 7 | (United States) Danny Sullivan | | All | |
| Galles Racing | Lola T93/00 | Chevrolet V8/C | 7 | (Mexico) Adrián Fernández | R | 10 | |
| Galles Racing | Lola T93/00 | Chevrolet V8/C | 11 | (Mexico) Adrián Fernández | R | 3, 5–6, 12, 16 | |
| Galles Racing | Lola T93/00 | Chevrolet V8/C | 11 | (United States) Kevin Cogan | | 4, 7–9 | |
| Hall/VDS Racing | Lola T93/00 | Chevrolet V8/C | 8 | (Italy) Teo Fabi | | All | |
| Hemelgarn Racing | Lola T91/00 | Buick | 91 | (United States) Stan Fox | | 4 | |
| Hemelgarn Racing | Lola T92/00 | Buick | 92 | (Belgium) Didier Theys | | 4 | |
| Indy Regency Racing | Lola T92/00 | Chevrolet V8/A | 29 | (France) Olivier Grouillard | R | 4–16 | |
| King Racing | Lola T93/00 | Chevrolet V8/C | 40 | (Colombia) Roberto Guerrero | | 1–13 | |
| King Racing | Lola T93/00 | Chevrolet V8/C | 40 | (United States) Eddie Cheever | | 14–16 | |
| King Racing | Lola T93/00 | Chevrolet V8/C | 60 | (United Kingdom) Jim Crawford | | 4 | |
| King Racing | Lola T93/00 | Chevrolet V8/C | 80 | (United States) Al Unser | | 4 | |
| Leader Cards Racing | Lola T91/00 | Chevrolet V8/A | 20 | (United States) Buddy Lazier | | 1–3, 6, 8 | |
| Leader Cards Racing | Lola T91/00 | Buick | 20 | (United States) Buddy Lazier | | 4–5, 12, 14–16 | |
| Leader Cards Racing | Lola T92/00 | Buick | 20 | (United States) Buddy Lazier | | 10–11 | |
| Leader Cards Racing | Lola T91/00 | Buick | 98 | (United States) Brian Bonner | | 4 | |
| Newman/Haas Racing | Lola T93/00 | Ford XB | 5 | (United Kingdom) Nigel Mansell | R | All | |
| Newman/Haas Racing | Lola T93/00 | Ford XB | 6 | (United States) Mario Andretti | | All | |
| Nu-Tech Motorsports | Lola T91/00 | Chevrolet V8/A | 28 | (United States) Brian Bonner | | 8 | |
| Nu-Tech Motorsports | Lola T91/00 | Cosworth | 33 | (United States) Dennis Vitolo | | 6 | |
| Pagan Racing | Lola T92/00 | Buick | 21 | (United States) Jeff Andretti | | 4 | |
| Pagan Racing | Lola T92/00 | Buick | 81 | (United States) Mark Smith | R | 4 | |
| Penske Racing | Penske PC-22 | Chevrolet V8/C | 4 | (Brazil) Emerson Fittipaldi | | All | |
| Penske Racing | Penske PC-22 | Chevrolet V8/C | 12 | (Canada) Paul Tracy | | All | |
| ProFormance Motorsports | Lola T91/00 | Chevrolet V8/A | 45 | (United States) Scott Pruett | | 2–4, 6, 9, 14, 16 | |
| ProFormance Motorsports | Lola T91/00 | Chevrolet V8/A | 45 | (United States) John Paul Jr. | | 14 | |
| Rahal/Hogan Racing | Rahal-Hogan RH-001 (Note: Used by Bobby Rahal at rounds 1–4, and by Mike Groff at rounds 5–7 and 11.); Lola T93/00 | Chevrolet V8/C | 1 | (United States) Bobby Rahal | | All | |
| Rahal/Hogan Racing | Rahal-Hogan RH-001; Lola T93/00 | Chevrolet V8/C | 26 | (United States) Mike Groff | | 5–7, 11–12, 14 | |
| Sinden-McNeice Racing | Lola T92/00 | Chevrolet V8/A | 44 | (United States) John Brooks | R | 16 | |
| Sovereign Racing | Lola T92/00 | Chevrolet V8/A | 30 | (Brazil) Marco Greco | R | All | |
| Sovereign Racing | Lola T91/00 | Buick | 43 | (United States) Rocky Moran | | 4 | |
| Team Menard | Lola T93/00 | Menard | 27 | (Australia) Geoff Brabham | | 4 | |
| Team Menard | Lola T93/00 | Menard | 51 | (United States) Gary Bettenhausen | | 4 | |
| Team Menard | Lola T93/00 | Menard | 77 | (Brazil) Nelson Piquet | R | 4 | |
| Team Menard | Lola T92/00 | Buick | 59 | (United States) Eddie Cheever | | 4 | |
| Turley Motorsports | Penske PC-21 | Chevrolet V8/B | 69 | (United States) Eddie Cheever | | 1–2 | |
| Turley Motorsports | Penske PC-21 | Chevrolet V8/B | 99 | (United States) Eddie Cheever | | 3–4, 6 | |
| Turley Motorsports | Penske PC-21 | Chevrolet V8/B | 99 | (United States) Brian Till | | 7–9, 11–12, 14–16 | |
| Walker Motorsports | Lola T93/00 | Ford XB | 2 | (Canada) Scott Goodyear | | All | |
| Walker Motorsports | Lola T93/00 | Ford XB | 15 | (Japan) Hiro Matsushita | | All | |
| Walker Motorsports | Lola T92/00 | Ford XB | 75 | (United States) Willy T. Ribbs | | 4–16 | |

=== Driver changes ===
==== Preseason ====
- On August 14, 1992, Scott Pruett confirmed he was out of a seat for 1993, after the demise of Truesports and the decision by Rahal-Hogan Racing, soon-to-be new owners of the team's facilities, to remain as a one-car operation.
- On September 7, 1992, Michael Andretti announced he would leave Newman/Haas Racing at the end of the 1992 PPG Indy Car World Series after having signed a deal to drive for McLaren in the 1993 Formula One World Championship. Eleven days later, on September 18, it was announced that Nigel Mansell, who had just won the 1992 Formula One World Championship, would replace Andretti at Newman/Haas. Mansell's association with "Red 5", the number he was allocated at Williams, led to Newman/Haas obtaining the use of No. 5 for Mansell's car in 1993.
- On October 17, 1992, Arciero Racing announced that rookie Mark Smith had signed a 12-race deal to drive the No. 25 car. The program was focused on the road courses and the Indianapolis 500, though he eventually entered the Nazareth race for his first Indy Car oval start after failing to qualify for the Indy 500. Smith had finished 7th in his third Indy Lights season, after being runner-up in 1991.
- On November 23, 1992, A. J. Foyt Enterprises announced that Robby Gordon had been signed on a full-time basis to drive the No. 14 car, which was raced by multiple drivers over the previous year. Gordon switched from Chip Ganassi Racing after his part-time rookie year. At the time, team owner A. J. Foyt did not commit to race at the Indianapolis 500.
- On November 24, 1992, King Racing announced it would expand his program to contest a full season with a one-car team, fielding Roberto Guerrero in the No. 40 car after his truncated pole-winning effort at the Indianapolis 500. The team also confirmed a three-car team for the Indy 500, with no other drivers assigned.
- On February 8, 1993, Rahal-Hogan Racing announced it would field a second car in five races for its new test driver Mike Groff. His program was due to begin in June at Milwaukee, where Rahal-Hogan intended to introduce its new 1993 car.

=== Team changes ===
==== Preseason ====
- On August 14, 1992, Truesports announced it would cease operations at the end of their eleventh season in the series, due to the declining interest of team owner Barbara Trueman. Truesports also announced a deal to sell its facilities at Columbus, Ohio facilities to Rahal-Hogan Racing, which would move from Indianapolis. On October 7, 1992, Rahal-Hogan Racing announced it would continue the development of the Truesports 92C chassis, which was renamed as the Rahal-Hogan RH-001 in February 1993.
- On September 29, 1992, the Buick Motor Division announced it would discontinue its Indy Car program after nine seasons, stopping further development on its stock-block engines, which had been largely confined to the Indianapolis 500 due to the more restrictive CART rules regarding turbocharger boost. Chevrolet responded to this development in early October 1992 by making their V8/A engines available for Indy-only teams or partial programs.
- On October 17, 1992, Frank Arciero announced that Arciero Racing would return as an independent team, reverting the gradual ownership transfer over the 1992 season to McCormack Motorsports, which would continue on its own. Arciero signed a deal with Penske Racing to use its 1992 package, consisting of a Penske PC-21 chassis and Chevrolet V8/B engines, as part of a technical alliance that included joint testing.
- On November 23, 1992, A. J. Foyt Enterprises announced that the team would switch engine suppliers, from Chevrolet to the Ford XB engine, which went along with the signing of Ford factory driver Robby Gordon. He would compete in the first two races of the season with a Lola T92/00 bought from Chip Ganassi Racing, the same package Gordon had driven before. Two days later, on November 25, 1992, Walker Motorsports announced the same switch of engines with returning driver Scott Goodyear.
- On November 24, 1992, King Racing announced it would compete with the new Chevrolet V8/C engines for its first full-time season, ditching the discontinued Buick powerplant.

== Schedule ==
| Icon | Legend |
|---|---|
| O | Oval/Speedway |
| R | Road course |
| S | Street circuit |

| Rnd | Date | Race Name | Circuit | Location |
|---|---|---|---|---|
| 1 | March 21 | Australian FAI IndyCar Grand Prix | S Surfers Paradise Street Circuit | Surfers Paradise, Australia |
| 2 | April 4 | Valvoline 200 | O Phoenix International Raceway | Phoenix, Arizona |
| 3 | April 18 | Toyota Grand Prix of Long Beach | S Streets of Long Beach | Long Beach, California |
| 4 | May 30 | Indianapolis 500 | O Indianapolis Motor Speedway | Speedway, Indiana |
| 5 | June 6 | Miller Genuine Draft 200 | O Milwaukee Mile | West Allis, Wisconsin |
| 6 | June 13 | ITT Automotive Detroit Grand Prix | S The Raceway on Belle Isle Park | Detroit, Michigan |
| 7 | June 27 | Budweiser/G. I. Joe's 200 | R Portland International Raceway | Portland, Oregon |
| 8 | July 11 | Budweiser Grand Prix of Cleveland | S Cleveland Burke Lakefront Airport | Cleveland, Ohio |
| 9 | July 18 | Molson Indy Toronto | S Exhibition Place | Toronto, Ontario |
| 10 | August 1 | Marlboro 500 | O Michigan International Speedway | Brooklyn, Michigan |
| 11 | August 8 | New England 200 | O New Hampshire International Speedway | Loudon, New Hampshire |
| 12 | August 22 | Texaco/Havoline 200 | R Road America | Elkhart Lake, Wisconsin |
| 13 | August 29 | Molson Indy Vancouver | S Streets of Vancouver | Vancouver, British Columbia |
| 14 | September 12 | Pioneer Electronics 200 | R Mid-Ohio Sports Car Course | Lexington, Ohio |
| 15 | September 19 | Bosch Spark Plug Grand Prix | O Nazareth Speedway | Nazareth, Pennsylvania |
| 16 | October 3 | Toyota Monterey Grand Prix | R Laguna Seca Raceway | Monterey, California |

* Indianapolis was USAC-sanctioned but counted towards the PPG Indy Car title.

== Results ==
| Rd. | Race | Pole position | Fastest lap | Most laps led | Race winner | | | | Report |
| Rd. | Race | Pole position | Fastest lap | Most laps led | Driver | Team | Chassis | Engine | Report |
|---|---|---|---|---|---|---|---|---|---|
| 1 | Surfers Paradise | (United Kingdom) Nigel Mansell | (United Kingdom) Nigel Mansell | (Brazil) Emerson Fittipaldi | (United Kingdom) Nigel Mansell | Newman/Haas Racing | Lola T93/00 | Ford XB | Report |
| 2 | Phoenix | (Canada) Scott Goodyear | (Canada) Paul Tracy | (Canada) Paul Tracy | (United States) Mario Andretti | Newman/Haas Racing | Lola T93/00 | Ford XB | Report |
| 3 | Long Beach | (United Kingdom) Nigel Mansell | (Canada) Paul Tracy | (Canada) Paul Tracy | (Canada) Paul Tracy | Penske Racing | Penske PC-22 | Chevrolet V8/C | Report |
| 4 | Indianapolis | (Netherlands) Arie Luyendyk | (Brazil) Emerson Fittipaldi | (United States) Mario Andretti | (Brazil) Emerson Fittipaldi | Penske Racing | Penske PC-22 | Chevrolet V8/C | Report |
| 5 | Milwaukee | (Brazil) Raul Boesel | (Brazil) Raul Boesel | (Brazil) Raul Boesel | (United Kingdom) Nigel Mansell | Newman/Haas Racing | Lola T93/00 | Ford XB | Report |
| 6 | Detroit | (United Kingdom) Nigel Mansell | (United Kingdom) Nigel Mansell | (United States) Danny Sullivan | (United States) Danny Sullivan | Galles Racing | Lola T93/00 | Chevrolet V8/C | Report |
| 7 | Portland | (United Kingdom) Nigel Mansell | (Brazil) Emerson Fittipaldi | (Brazil) Emerson Fittipaldi | (Brazil) Emerson Fittipaldi | Penske Racing | Penske PC-22 | Chevrolet V8/C | Report |
| 8 | Cleveland | (Canada) Paul Tracy | (Canada) Paul Tracy | (Canada) Paul Tracy | (Canada) Paul Tracy | Penske Racing | Penske PC-22 | Chevrolet V8/C | Report |
| 9 | Toronto | (Brazil) Emerson Fittipaldi | (Brazil) Emerson Fittipaldi | (Canada) Paul Tracy | (Canada) Paul Tracy | Penske Racing | Penske PC-22 | Chevrolet V8/C | Report |
| 10 | Michigan | (United States) Mario Andretti | (United Kingdom) Nigel Mansell | (United Kingdom) Nigel Mansell | (United Kingdom) Nigel Mansell | Newman/Haas Racing | Lola T93/00 | Ford XB | Report |
| 11 | New Hampshire | (United Kingdom) Nigel Mansell | (United Kingdom) Nigel Mansell | (Canada) Paul Tracy | (United Kingdom) Nigel Mansell | Newman/Haas Racing | Lola T93/00 | Ford XB | Report |
| 12 | Road America | (Canada) Paul Tracy | (Canada) Paul Tracy | (Canada) Paul Tracy | (Canada) Paul Tracy | Penske Racing | Penske PC-22 | Chevrolet V8/C | Report |
| 13 | Vancouver | (Canada) Scott Goodyear | (United States) Bobby Rahal | (United States) Bobby Rahal | (United States) Al Unser Jr. | Galles Racing | Lola T93/00 | Chevrolet V8/C | Report |
| 14 | Mid-Ohio | (United Kingdom) Nigel Mansell | (Brazil) Emerson Fittipaldi | (Brazil) Emerson Fittipaldi | (Brazil) Emerson Fittipaldi | Penske Racing | Penske PC-22 | Chevrolet V8/C | Report |
| 15 | Nazareth | (United Kingdom) Nigel Mansell | (United Kingdom) Nigel Mansell | (United Kingdom) Nigel Mansell | (United Kingdom) Nigel Mansell | Newman/Haas Racing | Lola T93/00 | Ford XB | Report |
| 16 | Laguna Seca | (Brazil) Emerson Fittipaldi | (Canada) Paul Tracy | (Canada) Paul Tracy | (Canada) Paul Tracy | Penske Racing | Penske PC-22 | Chevrolet V8/C | Report |

== Points standings ==
=== Drivers standings ===
| Pos | Driver | SUR (Australia) | PHX (United States) | LBH (United States) | INDY (United States) | MIL (United States) | BEL (United States) | POR (United States) | CLE (United States) | TOR (Canada) | MIS (United States) | NHS (United States) | ROA (United States) | VAN (Canada) | MOH (United States) | NAZ (United States) | LAG (United States) | Pts |
|---|---|---|---|---|---|---|---|---|---|---|---|---|---|---|---|---|---|---|
| 1 | (United Kingdom) Nigel Mansell RY | **1** | Wth | **3** | 3 | 1 | **15** | **2** | 3 | 20 | 1* | **1** | 2 | 6 | **12** | **1*** | 23 | 192 |
| 2 | (Brazil) Emerson Fittipaldi | 2* | 14 | 13 | 1 | 3 | 23 | 1* | 2 | **2** | 13 | 3 | 5 | 7 | 1* | 5 | **2** | 183 |
| 3 | (Canada) Paul Tracy | 21 | 16* | 1* | 30 | 20 | 9 | 3 | **1*** | 1* | 19 | 2* | **1*** | 13 | 25 | 3 | 1* | 157 |
| 4 | (United States) Bobby Rahal | 6 | 22 | 2 | DNQ | 4 | 5 | 4 | 28 | 4 | 9 | 7 | 3 | 2* | 6 | 6 | 7 | 133 |
| 5 | (Brazil) Raul Boesel | 8 | 2 | 12 | 4 | **2*** | 2 | 7 | 7 | 7 | 4 | 21 | 4 | 9 | 4 | 9 | 11 | 132 |
| 6 | (United States) Mario Andretti | 4 | 1 | 18 | 5* | 18 | 3 | 6 | 5 | 8 | **2** | 20 | 15 | 5 | 7 | 13 | 9 | 117 |
| 7 | (United States) Al Unser Jr. | 15 | 4 | 21 | 8 | 5 | 6 | 5 | 19 | 5 | 8 | 8 | 25 | 1 | 8 | 25 | 5 | 100 |
| 8 | (Netherlands) Arie Luyendyk | 5 | 6 | 11 | **2** | 22 | 17 | 10 | 10 | 22 | 3 | 25 | 9 | 25 | 5 | 8 | 3 | 90 |
| 9 | (Canada) Scott Goodyear | 10 | **20** | 16 | 7 | 23 | 10 | 12 | 20 | 9 | 5 | 19 | 10 | **4** | 3 | 2 | 4 | 86 |
| 10 | (United States) Robby Gordon | 3 | 18 | DSQ | 27 | 10 | 8 | 8 | 6 | 6 | 15 | 5 | 20 | 23 | 2 | 4 | 10 | 84 |
| 11 | (Italy) Teo Fabi | 9 | 5 | 4 | 9 | 9 | 22 | 25 | 8 | 14 | 6 | 16 | 8 | 8 | 24 | 11 | 8 | 64 |
| 12 | (United States) Danny Sullivan | 13 | 23 | 8 | 33 | 16 | 1* | 14 | 14 | 3 | | 22 | 26 | 10 | 27 | 20 | 27 | 43 |
| 13 | (Sweden) Stefan Johansson | 12 | 21 | 26 | 11 | 25 | 20 | 26 | 4 | 24 | 23 | 14 | 21 | 3 | 26 | 7 | 6 | 43 |
| 14 | (Colombia) Roberto Guerrero | 19 | 15 | 5 | 28 | 7 | 26 | 24 | 29 | 10 | 7 | 4 | 23 | 11 | | | | 39 |
| 15 | (United States) Scott Brayton | 16 | 25 | 24 | 6 | 6 | 14 | 17 | 18 | 19 | 11 | 6 | 7 | 24 | 9 | 15 | 24 | 36 |
| 16 | (United States) Jimmy Vasser | 24 | 3 | 22 | 13 | 8 | 16 | 11 | | 11 | | 9 | | 18 | 10 | | 21 | 30 |
| 17 | (United States) Eddie Cheever | 7 | 24 | 9 | 16 | | 21 | | | | | | 6 | | 28 | 10 | 14 | 21 |
| 18 | (Italy) Andrea Montermini R | 25 | | | | | 4 | | | 27 | | | | 19 | | | | 12 |
| 19 | (United States) Scott Pruett | | 7 | 7 | DNQ | | 25 | | | 26 | | | | | 15 | | 25 | 12 |
| 20 | (United States) Willy T. Ribbs | | | | 21 | 11 | 12 | 16 | 27 | 18 | 10 | 15 | 12 | 16 | 11 | 19 | 28 | 9 |
| 21 | (United States) Robbie Buhl R | 23 | 19 | 6 | Wth | 17 | 28 | | 24 | | | | 19 | | 14 | 17 | 16 | 8 |
| 22 | (United States) Mark Smith R | 18 | 9 | 10 | DNQ | | 27 | 29 | 15 | 23 | | | 24 | 22 | 19 | 12 | 17 | 8 |
| 23 | (United States) Mike Groff | | | | | 19 | 11 | 9 | | | | 11 | 18 | | 22 | | | 8 |
| 24 | (Mexico) Adrián Fernández R | | | 23 | | 21 | 7 | | | | Wth | | 29 | | | | 12 | 7 |
| 25 | (United States) Brian Till | | | | | | | 22 | 9 | 13 | | 10 | 22 | | 17 | 16 | 29 | 7 |
| 26 | (Japan) Hiro Matsushita | 11 | 10 | 14 | 18 | 13 | 13 | 21 | 12 | 16 | 14 | 13 | 13 | 12 | 13 | 21 | 19 | 7 |
| 27 | (United States) David Kudrave R | | 8 | DNS | | 24 | | 23 | | | 12 | 23 | | | 23 | 14 | | 6 |
| 28 | (France) Olivier Grouillard R | | | | DNQ | 12 | 24 | 13 | 11 | DNS | 17 | 12 | 16 | 26 | 16 | 18 | 20 | 4 |
| 29 | (United States) John Andretti | | | | 10 | | | | | | | | | | | | | 3 |
| 30 | (Brazil) Marco Greco R | 22 | 11 | 25 | Wth | DNQ | 19 | 19 | 22 | 21 | 18 | 17 | 28 | 20 | 18 | 23 | DNQ | 2 |
| 31 | (Germany) Christian Danner | | | | | | | | 25 | | | | 11 | | | | 26 | 2 |
| 32 | (Canada) Ross Bentley | 17 | 12 | 15 | DNQ | 14 | DNQ | 15 | 16 | 25 | 16 | | 17 | 17 | DNQ | 22 | DNQ | 1 |
| 33 | (United States) Al Unser | | | | 12 | | | | | | | | | | | | | 1 |
| 34 | (France) Bertrand Gachot R | | | | | | | | | 12 | | | | | | | | 1 |
| 35 | (United States) Kevin Cogan | | | | 14 | | | 27 | 13 | 15 | | | | | | | | 0 |
| 36 | (United States) Lyn St. James R | | 13 | 17 | 25 | | DNQ | 20 | 23 | | 22 | | | | | | | 0 |
| 37 | (Brazil) Maurício Gugelmin R | | | | | | | | | | | | | | 21 | 24 | 13 | 0 |
| 38 | (United States) Buddy Lazier | 20 | 17 | 19 | DNQ | 15 | 18 | | 21 | | 21 | Wth | 14 | | 20 | 26 | DNQ | 0 |
| 39 | (United States) Dominic Dobson | | | | 23 | | | | | | | | | 14 | Wth | | 18 | 0 |
| 40 | (Australia) Gary Brabham R | 14 | | | | | | | | | | | | | | | | 0 |
| 41 | (United States) Jeff Wood | | Wth | 20 | | DNQ | DNQ | 28 | 17 | 28 | 20 | 24 | 27 | 15 | DNQ | | DNQ | 0 |
| 42 | (Belgium) Didier Theys | | | | 22 | | | | | | | | | | | | 15 | 0 |
| 43 | (United States) Davy Jones | | | | 15 | | | | | | | | | | | | | 0 |
| 44 | (United States) Johnny Unser R | | | | | | | 18 | | 17 | | 18 | | 21 | | | | 0 |
| 45 | (United States) Gary Bettenhausen | | | | 17 | | | | | | | | | | | | | 0 |
| 46 | (France) Stéphan Grégoire R | | | | 19 | | | | | | | | | | | | | 0 |
| 47 | (United States) Tony Bettenhausen Jr. | | | | 20 | | | | | | | | | | | | | 0 |
| 48 | (United States) Scott Sharp R | | | | | | | | | | | | | | | | 22 | 0 |
| 49 | (United Kingdom) Jim Crawford | | | | 24 | | | | | | | | | | | | | 0 |
| 50 | (United States) Brian Bonner | | | | DNQ | | | | 26 | | | | | | | | | 0 |
| 51 | (Australia) Geoff Brabham R | | | | 26 | | | | | | | | | | | | | 0 |
| 52 | (Switzerland) Andrea Chiesa R | 26 | | | | | | | | | | | | | | | | 0 |
| 53 | (United States) Jeff Andretti | | | | 29 | | | | | | | | | | | | | 0 |
| 54 | (United States) Stan Fox | | | | 31 | | | | | | | | | | | | | 0 |
| 55 | (Brazil) Nelson Piquet R | | | | 32 | | | | | | | | | | | | | 0 |
| | (United States) John Paul Jr. | | | | DNQ | | | | | | | | | | Wth | | | 0 |
| | (Belgium) Éric Bachelart | | | | DNQ | | | | | | | | | | | | | 0 |
| | (United States) Rocky Moran | | | | DNQ | | | | | | | | | | | | | 0 |
| | (United States) Dennis Vitolo | | | | | | DNQ | | | | | | | | | | | 0 |
| | (United States) John Brooks | | | | | | | | | | | | | | | | DNQ | 0 |
| | (United States) A. J. Foyt | | | | Wth | | | | | | | | | | | | | 0 |
| Pos | Driver | SUR (Australia) | PHX (United States) | LBH (United States) | INDY (United States) | MIL (United States) | BEL (United States) | POR (United States) | CLE (United States) | TOR (Canada) | MIS (United States) | NHS (United States) | ROA (United States) | VAN (Canada) | MOH (United States) | NAZ (United States) | LAG (United States) | Pts |

| Color | Result |
|---|---|
| Gold | Winner |
| Silver | 2nd place |
| Bronze | 3rd place |
| Green | 4th-6th place |
| Light Blue | 7th-12th place |
| Dark Blue | Finished (Outside Top 12) |
| Purple | Did not finish |
| Red | Did not qualify (DNQ) |
| Brown | Withdrawn (Wth) |
| Black | Disqualified (DSQ) |
| White | Did not start (DNS) |
| Blank | Did not participate (DNP) |
| Blank | Not competing |

**In-line notation**
| **Bold** | Pole position |
| Italics | Ran fastest race lap |
| * | Led most race laps |
| RY | Rookie of the Year |
| R | Rookie |

=== Chassis Constructors' Cup ===
| Pos | Chassis | Pts |
|---|---|---|
| 1 | (United Kingdom) Lola T9300/T9200/T9100 | 297 |
| 2 | (United States) Penske PC-22/PC-21 | 256 |
| 3 | (United States) Rahal-Hogan RH-001 | 32 |
| 4 | (United States) Galmer 92B | 0 |
| Pos | Chassis | Pts |

=== Engine Manufacturers' Cup ===
| Pos | Engine | Pts |
|---|---|---|
| 1 | (United States) Chevrolet A/B/C | 343 |
| 2 | (United States) Ford XB | 269 |
| 3 | (United Kingdom) Cosworth DFS | 0 |
| 4 | (United States) Buick | 0 |
| 5 | (United States) Menard | 0 |
| Pos | Engine | Pts |

== See also ==
- 1993 Indianapolis 500
- 1993 Toyota Atlantic Championship season
- 1993 Indy Lights season

== Bibliography ==
- Shaw, Jeremy, ed. (1993). Autocourse Indy Car 1993-94: Official Yearbook. Richmond, Surrey: Hazleton Publishing. ISBN 978-1-874557-45-6.
