= 1993 Indianapolis 500 =

American motor race

77th Indianapolis 500
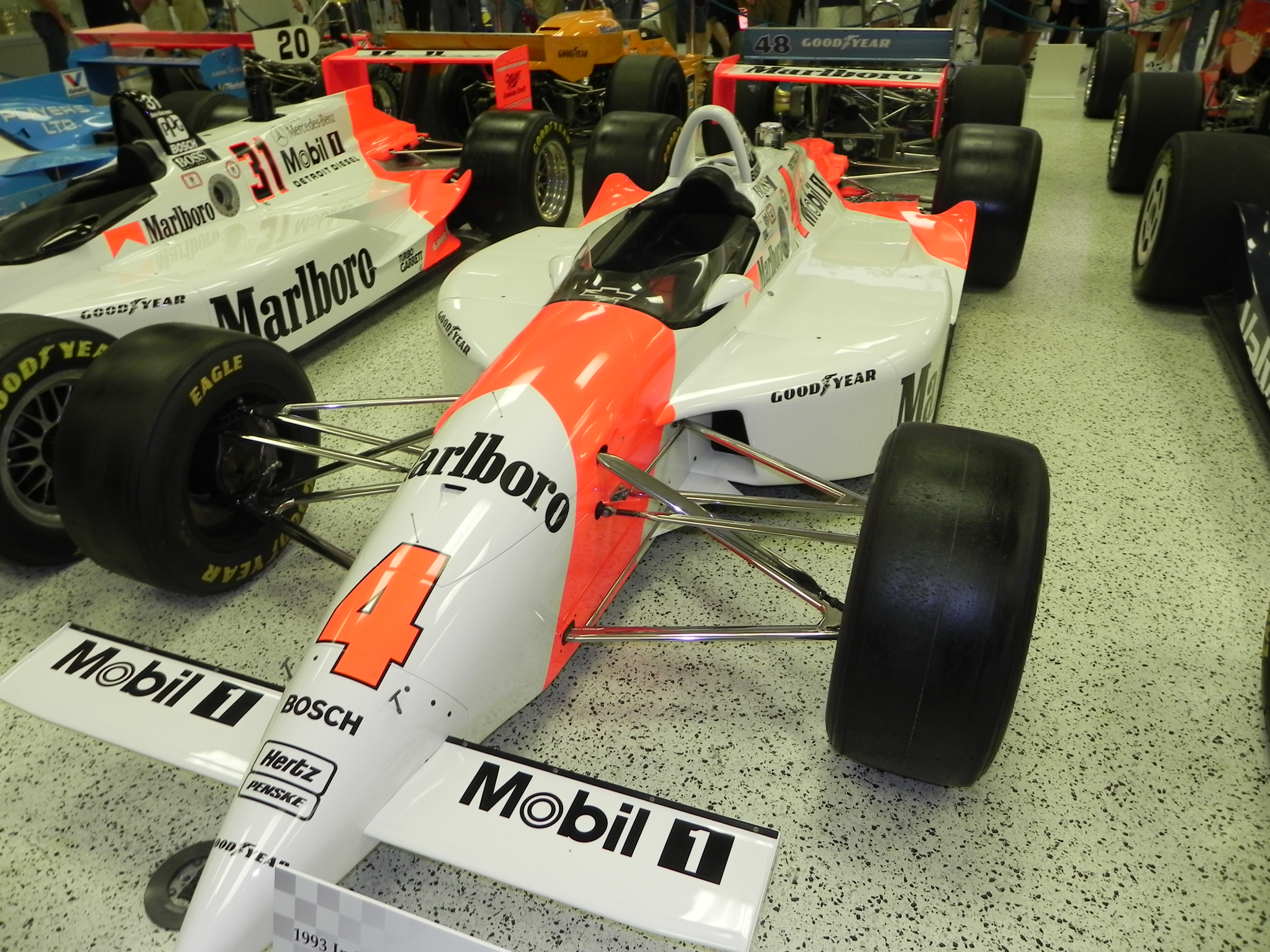

Indianapolis Motor Speedway

Indianapolis 500
- Sanctioning body: USAC
- Season: 1993 CART season 1992–93 Gold Crown
- Date: May 30, 1993
- Winner: (Brazil) Emerson Fittipaldi
- Winning team: Penske Racing
- Winning Chief Mechanic: Rick Rinaman
- Time of race: 3:10:49.860
- Average speed: 157.207 mph (253.000 km/h)
- Pole position: (Netherlands) Arie Luyendyk
- Pole speed: 223.967 mph (360.440 km/h)
- Fastest qualifier: (Netherlands) Arie Luyendyk
- Rookie of the Year: (United Kingdom) Nigel Mansell
- Most laps led: (United States) Mario Andretti (73)

Pre-race ceremonies
- National anthem: Florence Henderson
- "Back Home Again in Indiana": Jim Nabors
- Starting command: Mary F. Hulman
- Pace car: Chevrolet Camaro Z-28
- Pace car driver: Jim Perkins
- Starter: Duane Sweeney
- Honorary starter: Nick Fornoro
- Estimated attendance: 400,000

Television in the United States
- Network: ABC
- Announcers: Host/Lap-by-lap: Paul Page; Color Analyst: Sam Posey; Color Analyst/Turn 2: Bobby Unser
- Nielsen ratings: 9.3 / 30

Chronology
Previous	Next
1992	1994

The 77th Indianapolis 500 was held at the Indianapolis Motor Speedway in Speedway, Indiana on Sunday, May 30, 1993. Emerson Fittipaldi took the lead with 16 laps to go, and won his second career Indy 500 victory. The race was sanctioned by the United States Auto Club (USAC) and was part of the 1993 PPG Indy Car World Series. Several sidebar stories during the month complemented one of the most competitive Indy 500 races in recent years.

Much of the pre-race attention for the month focused heavily on rookie Nigel Mansell, the reigning Formula One World Champion, who joined the CART Indy car series during the offseason. A large international media contingent arrived at the track creating a huge frenzy surrounding the Englishman. Mansell was competitive all afternoon, and was leading the race on lap 184 as the field was coming to a restart. His inexperience on oval circuits, however, led to him misjudging the restart speed and he was quickly passed down the main stretch by Fittipaldi, which proved to be the winning move.

The top three finishers consisted of the Brazilian Fittipaldi, Dutchman Arie Luyendyk, and the English Mansell, the first time since 1915 that all of the top three finishers were from countries other than the United States. Additionally, the fourth- and fifth-place finishers were Brazilian Raul Boesel and Italian-born American Mario Andretti.

After hinting about retirement in 1991 (and later retracting retirement plans in 1992), four-time Indy 500 winner A. J. Foyt entered the 1993 race and participated in the first week of practice. On the morning of pole day qualifying, rookie Robby Gordon, driving a Foyt team car, crashed during a practice session. The incident led to Foyt deciding to retire from Indy car racing after a 35-year career.

The 1993 race would be the final competitive drives at Indy for both Mario Andretti and Al Unser Sr. Andretti led the most laps, and finished in fifth place. Unser also led laps during the race, en route to a 12th-place finish. Andretti would drop out of the 1994 race, and retired after the 1994 season. Unser abruptly retired during practice for the 1994 race. Also grabbing headlines during qualifying was the plight of defending CART champion and 1986 Indy winner Bobby Rahal. After struggling to get his car up to speed, Rahal was bumped from the field on the final day of time trials.

Raul Boesel led 18 laps for owner Dick Simon, the first time a Simon-owned car ever led the Indy 500. Boesel took the lead at the start and had one of the fastest cars during the race. His chances for victory, however, were foiled due to two pit stop penalties, which dropped him to the back of the pack. He worked his way back up to a remarkable 4th-place finish, but in post race interviews, felt the race had been stolen from him, saying "in my mind, this race is mine."

== Background ==
Sweeping changes were seen at Indy for 1993, both at the track and amongst the competitors. After the many crashes during the 1992 race, rule changes were implemented to slow cars down and to better protect drivers in crashes. Among the noticeable changes were smaller rear wings, and the banning of the wheel disc inserts. In addition, the front noses of the cars were changed, intended to protect the drivers' feet in a crash. Cockpits were to be redesigned to allow drivers to pull their feet back before impact.

Also making news at the Speedway was the official announcement of the Brickyard 400, to be held in 1994. Tony George and Bill France Jr. jointly announced the race on April 14 during a ceremony at the museum, a few weeks before opening day. The race would give the Speedway two major events annually starting in 1994.

Beginning in 1993, a speed limit in the pit lane (100 mph) was enforced at all times. In the previous year, it was only in force during caution periods.

=== Driver and team changes ===
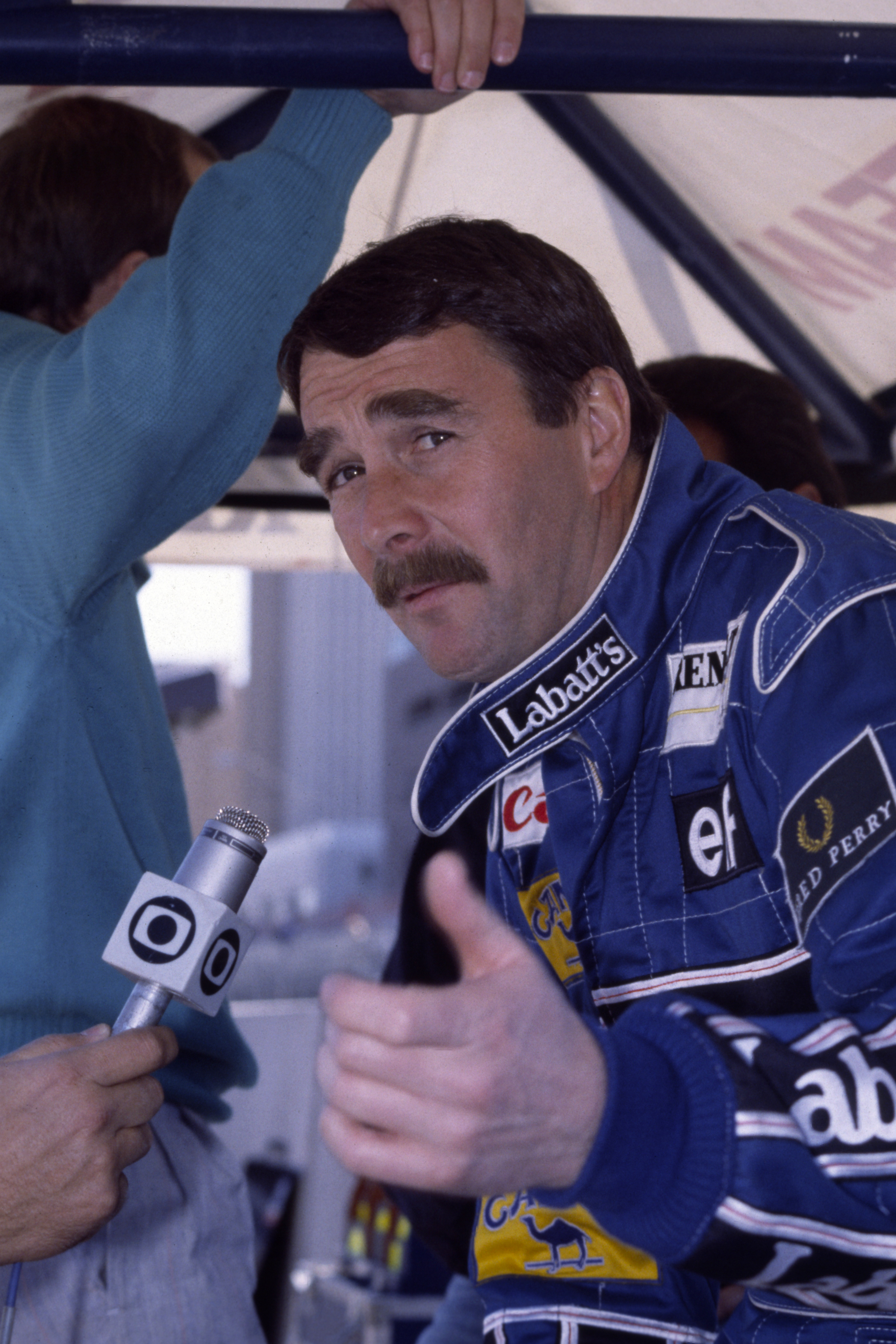
Nigel Mansell arrived at Indy for the first time in 1993.

During the offseason, four-time Indy 500 winner Rick Mears announced his retirement from racing. Penske driver Paul Tracy was elevated into the ride, taking over full-time, where he had previously driven part-time in 1991–1992. Tracy would earn his first career Indy car victory at Long Beach, the last race before Indianapolis.

The biggest story going into the season surrounded Newman/Haas Racing. Michael Andretti left the CART series and signed with McLaren to drive in Formula One. Taking Andretti's place would be reigning Formula One World Champion Nigel Mansell. Mansell came to the American open wheel series with considerable fanfare and huge media attention. Mansell joined fellow former World Driving champion Mario Andretti as teammates. Mansell won the CART season-opener at Surfers Paradise, but was involved in a crash during practice for the Valvoline 200 at Phoenix. He suffered a back injury, and sat out that event. Meanwhile, Mario Andretti subsequently won that race at Phoenix, notching his 52nd and final Indy car victory.

Since he missed the Phoenix race, Indianapolis would serve as Nigel Mansell's first-ever oval race start. Mansell underwent back surgery on April 28, forcing him to miss Rookie Orientation, and the opening weekend of practice at Indy. Officials would arrange for a special session in which Mansell could conduct his mandatory rookie test.

Truesports racing was absorbed by Rahal-Hogan Racing, and driver Bobby Rahal took over the existing Truesports chassis program to start out the season. Rahal entered the race as the defending CART series champion, and was coming off a second-place finish at Long Beach.

Galles Racing maintained its driver lineup for 1993. Defending Indy 500 winner Al Unser Jr. returned, as did Danny Sullivan. The team, however, scrapped the Galmer chassis program. Kevin Cogan joined the team at Indy only, making it a three-car Indy 500 effort.

At Chip Ganassi Racing, Eddie Cheever departed, and was replaced by Arie Luyendyk. In 1992, Luyendyk was out of a full-time ride, and drove for Ganassi at Indy and Michigan only. For 1993, Luyendyk was back with the team, this time for a full-season ride. After his devastating crash in 1992, Nelson Piquet returned to Indy after a lengthy rehabilitation. Former winners Tom Sneva and Gordon Johncock also retired during the off-season, though Sneva did arrive at the track hoping for an outside chance to land a ride.

After two years of retirement rumors, four-time winner A. J. Foyt entered once again as a driver, looking to qualify for his 36th consecutive Indy 500. Rookie driver Robby Gordon was entered in a second Foyt team car. The other active four-time winner, Al Unser Sr., secured a ride with King Racing. The previous two years, Unser had entered the month without a ride.

=== Track improvements ===
Following the 1992 race, an extensive construction project was undertaken at the Speedway. The "apron" lane at the bottom of the track was removed, and replaced with a new separated warm-up lane, similar to the one at Nazareth Speedway. A grass strip physically separated the track surface from the new warm up lane. Rumble strips were installed below the white line to discourage drivers from dipping below the white line. The improvements were made in an effort to curtail speeds, and reduce impact angles, but were criticized by some who said that it made the track too narrow and would make passing more difficult.

The entire outer retaining wall and catch fence was replaced, mostly in anticipation of the 1994 Brickyard 400. Other physical improvements included new grandstands at the north end of the circuit, observation mounds in the infield, and the completion of a new championship-caliber golf course on the grounds, designed by Pete Dye called Brickyard Crossing.

== Race schedule ==
Race schedule — April/May 1993
Sun	Mon	Tue	Wed	Thu	Fri	Sat
25	26	27	28	29	30; ROP	1 ROP
2 ROP	3	4	5	6	7 Mini-Marathon	8 Practice
9 Practice	10; Practice	11; Practice	12; Practice	13; Practice	14; Practice	15; Pole Day
16; Time Trials	17; Practice	18; Practice	19; Practice	20; Practice	21; Practice	22; Time Trials
23; Bump Day	24	25	26	27; Carb Day	28	29; Parade
30; Indy 500	31; Memorial Day					

Color	Notes
Green	Practice
Dark Blue	Time trials
Silver	Race day
Red	Rained out*
Blank	No track activity

* Includes days where track
activity was significantly
limited due to rain

ROP — denotes Rookie
Orientation Program

== Practice: week 1 ==
=== Opening Day: Saturday May 8 ===
The traditional opening day ceremonies were capped off when Dick Simon Racing was the first team out on the track (for the 6th consecutive year). Marco Greco was the first driver to complete a lap, with the rest of the Simon cars following in a diamond formation.

Shortly before 3 p.m., Jeff Andretti entered the warm up lane in turn three too fast, and slid back onto the track into the path of Roberto Guerrero's car. Guerrero went high to avoid Andretti's spinning car, and brushed the outside wall. Neither driver was injured.

Mario Andretti (222.124 mph) was the fastest car of the day.

=== Sunday May 9 ===
Paul Tracy was the fastest of the day. Jeff Andretti blew an engine, starting a huge fire at the back of his car, which he was able to guide back to the pits.

=== Monday May 10 ===
Team Penske led the speed charts, with Paul Tracy (220.724 mph) first and Emerson Fittipaldi (220.691 mph) second. Nelson Piquet was 9th-fastest before he clipped the outside wall exiting turn 2.

=== Tuesday May 11 ===
Arie Luyendyk set the fastest lap thus far for the month at 225.89 mph. Hiro Matsushita and Paul Tracy both survived separate spins at the pit entrance without hitting anything. At about 1:30 p.m., A. J. Foyt took his first shake down laps of the month, reaching a top lap of 212 mph.

=== Wednesday May 12 ===
Rookie Nigel Mansell passed his physical and began his four-phase drivers test. He breezed through all four phases, with a top lap of 218.579 mph. Though he was unable to attend the Rookie Orientation Program, Mansell received special permission from USAC to skip the program, due to his extensive auto racing experience and expertise.

Robbie Buhl crashed in turn two, suffering a concussion, which sidelined him until May 19. Ross Bentley and Olivier Grouillard also spun out on the track.

Raul Boesel topped the speed chart for the day at 224.461 mph.

=== Thursday May 13 ===
Arie Luyendyk once again set the fastest lap thus far for the month, raising it to 226.182 mph. The day was without incident, except for Robby Gordon, who "whitewalled" the outside wall at the southchute, suffering minor suspension damage.

Mario Andretti was second fastest (225.423 mph), the second driver of the month over 225 mph. In his first full day of practice, Nigel Mansell was 6th fastest, with lap of 224.372 mph.

=== Friday May 14 ===
Raul Boesel (225.592 mph) topped the speed chart for the final day of practice before pole day. Nigel Mansell continued to impress, posting the second-fastest lap of the day (224.949 mph). Mario Andretti was third, but Arie Luyendyk was only 9th fastest.

Incidents on the track involved three drivers. At 12:20 p.m., Didier Theys spun out of turn 4 and hit the inside wall, bouncing back to the middle of the frontstretch. The car was heavily damaged, but Theys suffered only a bruised thigh. At 1:53 p.m., Ross Bentley abruptly stopped on the main stretch, with the car on fire. He quickly scrambled to exit the cockpit. A fuel pressure regulator broke, spilling fuel, and igniting. Bentley suffered first and second-degree burns to his face and hands, and he would sit out the rest of the month. Late in the day, Mario Andretti spun in the warmup lane, but did not make contact.

== Time Trials: weekend 1 ==
=== Pole day – Saturday May 15 ===
==== A.J. Foyt retires ====
Pole day was warm and sunny. At 8:11 a.m., during the morning practice session, rookie Robby Gordon, driving the #41 Foyt entry, spun exiting turn 1, then brushed the wall with the nose of the car. The car continued to slide, righted itself forward, and slid along the outside wall in turn two. Gordon was uninjured. About two hours later, unexpectedly, A. J. Foyt donned his racing suit for the final time, and took to the track for a final "farewell" lap. After the Gordon crash, Foyt decided he was unable to fully concentrate his efforts on both driving and running the team successfully, and after previously hinting at retirement in 1991, he made his retirement official effective immediately.

An emotional and teary-eyed Foyt was interviewed by Tom Carnegie over the public address system, giving his farewell speech to the fans:

"It's a hard decision, but there comes a time. The fans have brought me back as many years as I've been back, but I felt like, if I'm gonna run a team, I can't be in a race car. Seems like every time I'm not with the car something happens, and I realized that this morning. Just as it...I went to get the green, the yellow come out, it's my other car. So, if I'm going to be a successful car owner, I've got to spend 110% of my time with the car and not think of A. J. So, Mr. [Lou] Bantle, and Ford Motor Company, this decision was made about, well when Robby hit the wall was when I made the decision. I intended to qualify, and the car's a very fast car, I got out of. I know it [would]'ve make the race very easy, I'd have no problem putting it in the show, and I think, like I said, [there] comes a time, I love all y'all a lot, you've been great fans, I love you, and I'll still be back and we'll still be up in the winner's circle. Thank you very much."

==== Open of qualifications ====
Promptly at 11:00 a.m., time trials began with Stan Fox the first driver in line. After three inconsistent laps, Fox waved off. Due to the challenging track layout (without the apron) and rules changes, several drivers and teams were uneasy about qualifying speeds and many waved off. Mario Andretti was the second car out, and completed his run at 223.414 mph, putting him on the provisional pole position.

In the first hour and fifteen minutes, only four cars completed runs. Nine cars waved off, including Arie Luyendyk, and Gary Bettenhausen wrecked on his fourth lap. At 12:30 p.m., Raul Boesel put his car on the front row with a run of 222.379 mph. Nigel Mansell waved off his first run, after three laps in the 218-219 mph range. At 1 p.m., with ten cars in the field, the track became quiet, as drivers awaited better conditions.

At 5 p.m., time trials resumed. Arie Luyendyk secured the pole position with a speed of 223.967 mph. Luyendyk bumped Mario Andretti to the middle of the front row, and Raul Boesel held on for the outside of the front row. Nigel Mansell was the next car out, making his second attempt. After a first lap of 221.811 mph, Mansell wildly veered to the middle of the track out of turn four (fearing that he brushed the wall exiting turn 4). His second lap dropped to 219 mph, and his four-lap average ended up 220.255 mph, good enough for 8th starting position in the middle of row 3.

Emerson Fittipaldi, Kevin Cogan, and Stefan Johansson were the only other cars to complete runs. The day ended with 15 cars in the field, and Pruett (216.794 mph) as the slowest. Bobby Rahal was among the drivers not yet in the field.

Pole Day
Pos.	No.	Driver	Team	Chassis	Engine	Speed
1	10	(Netherlands) Arie Luyendyk W	Chip Ganassi Racing	Lola	FordXB	223.967
2	6	(United States) Mario Andretti W	Newman/Haas Racing	Lola	FordXB	223.414
3	9	(Brazil) Raul Boesel	Dick Simon Racing	Lola	FordXB	222.379
4	2	(Canada) Scott Goodyear	Walker Racing	Lola	FordXB	222.344
5	3	(United States) Al Unser Jr. W	Galles Racing	Lola	Chevrolet	221.773
6	16	(Sweden) Stefan Johansson R	Bettenhausen Racing	Penske	Chevrolet	220.824
7	12	(Canada) Paul Tracy	Team Penske	Penske	Chevrolet	220.298
8	5	(United Kingdom) Nigel Mansell R	Newman/Haas Racing	Lola	FordXB	220.255
9	4	(Brazil) Emerson Fittipaldi W	Team Penske	Penske	Chevrolet	220.150
10	40	(Colombia) Roberto Guerrero	Budweiser King Racing	Lola	Chevrolet	219.645
11	22	(United States) Scott Brayton	Dick Simon Racing	Lola	FordXB	219.637
12	7	(United States) Danny Sullivan W	Galles Racing	Lola	Chevrolet	219.428
13	77	(Brazil) Nelson Piquet R	Menard Racing	Lola	Menard (Buick)	217.949
14	11	(United States) Kevin Cogan	Galles Racing	Lola	Chevrolet	217.230
15	46	(United States) Scott Pruett	ProFormance Motorsports	Lola	Chevrolet	216.794

=== Second day – Sunday May 16 ===
Several drivers who waved off on pole day completed runs on the second day. Among those who qualified comfortably were Jeff Andretti, Lyn St. James, and Teo Fabi. After struggling all week with the Truesports chassis, Bobby Rahal completed a run at 217.140 mph. French rookie Stéphan Grégoire's last-minute run of 220.851 mph, just before the closing gun, made him the fastest rookie and quickest qualifier for the day.

With the field filled to 26 cars, Mark Smith (214.356 mph) was the slowest car in the field. The only incident of the day involved Davy Jones, who blew an engine on the first lap of his qualifying attempt. The hot fluids entered the cockpit, and Jones scrambled to stop the car against the inside wall near the pit entrance and climbed out.

== Practice: week 2 ==
=== Monday – May 17 ===
A light day of track activity saw John Andretti shaking down a car for Willy T. Ribbs at Walker Motorsports. Andretti hit 220.157 mph in the car, the fastest non-qualified car of the afternoon.

=== Tuesday – May 18 ===
Rain kept cars off the track until 3 p.m. An abbreviated practice session saw only 15 cars on the track, with Teo Fabi (223.381 mph) the fastest of the day; his fastest lap all month. Willy T. Ribbs took his first laps of the month, and first laps since 1991, topping out in the 210 mph range.

=== Wednesday – May 19 ===
Éric Bachelart wrecked early in the session in turn 1, but he suffered only minor injuries. After being cleared to drive Wednesday morning, Robbie Buhl wrecked again, this time suffering an injured foot. To date, Dale Coyne Racing had now suffered four crashes in the month.

Emerson Fittipaldi, testing race setups, set the second-fastest lap of the month, at 226.051 mph, faster than the pole position speed. Olivier Grouillard, Eddie Cheever, and Jim Crawford led the speed chart for the non-qualified drivers.

=== Thursday – May 20 ===
The fastest lap of the month was turned in by Mario Andretti, who blistered the track at 227.118 mph. Jim Crawford (221.212 mph) set the pace for the non-qualified drivers. The day ended 15 minutes early due to rain.

=== Friday – May 21 ===
The final full day of practice saw heavy activity. A total of 33 cars ran 1,693 laps during the session, and the field passed 20,000 practice laps for the month. Nigel Mansell (225.468 mph) was the fastest-car of the day, and Robby Gordon (221.272 mph) led the non-qualified cars.

The only incident of the day involved Dominic Dobson, who spun to the inside of turn one, and lightly tapped the outside wall. The car was not damaged, and Dobson was not injured.

== Time Trials: weekend 2 ==
=== Third Day – Saturday May 22 ===
At the opening of time trials, Eddie Cheever was the first car to complete a qualifying run, It was his third and final attempt in the #99 Turley Motorsports entry. His speed of 216.415 mph, was disappointingly slow compared to his previous practice laps. Jim Crawford put a third King Racing entry in the field, with a comfortable speed of 217.612 mph.

John Andretti signed last-minute to drive the #84 Foyt entry, and quickly posted a speed of 221.746 mph, the fastest car of the afternoon, and 6th-fastest in the entire field. Robby Gordon, now the primary driver for Foyt, followed with a run of 220.085 mph.

At 5:17 p.m., Geoff Brabham easily bumped rookie Mark Smith from the field. Smith turned around and re-qualified his back-up car at 217.150 mph, bumping Eddie Cheever. The bumping continued with Willy T. Ribbs posting a solid run of 217.711 mph to bump Olivier Grouillard. Eddie Cheever took out his backup #99T car for an attempt (his fourth attempt of the month), but waved off. The day ended with Dominic Dobson bumping out Scott Pruett.

With questionable weather in the forecast for Sunday, the field was filled to 33 cars, with Bobby Rahal on the bubble.

=== Bump Day – Sunday May 23 ===
With the field already filled to 33 cars, Bump Day, the final day of time trials, started with unfavorable weather conditions. Wind gusts up to 30 mph were observed, which kept cars off the track most of the early afternoon. 1986 winner, and defending CART champion Bobby Rahal (217.140 mph) started the day on the bubble, as the slowest car in the field. His R/H chassis was proving to be uncompetitive in superspeedway trim.

On Sunday morning, Team Menard offered a spare car to Bobby Rahal, who was in considerable danger of failing to qualify. Rahal declined, opting instead to roll out his backup car, and start getting it up to speed. After a difficult time thus far in qualifying, Eddie Cheever quit the Turley team. He took up the offer with Menard that Rahal had declined.

Qualifying began at 5 p.m., with Eddie Cheever first out. Though his speed was seemingly fast enough to bump his way into the field, the crew waved off the run. Bobby Rahal remained on the bubble. Over the next half-hour, four drivers (Didier Theys, Scott Pruett, John Paul Jr., and Éric Bachelart) all attempted to bump Bobby Rahal from the field. John Paul Jr. blew his engine, and the rest were too slow and waved off. Rahal's team had to keep pulling his backup car out of line, and moving to the rear, increasing the risk that he would not be able to re-qualify if he got bumped.

With fifteen minutes left in the day, Eddie Cheever took to the track, his second attempt in the Menard entry, and his sixth qualifying attempt overall of the month - and Indy 500 record at the time. At 217.599 mph, Cheever bumped Bobby Rahal from the field. The move put rookie Mark Smith (217.150 mph) on the bubble. At 5:54 p.m., Didier Theys took to the track, and completed his run at 217.752 mph. Theys bumped Smith, and added to the lore of the Curse of the Smiths at the Indy 500. Smith hopped into a backup car borrowed from Pagan Racing, but would not make it to the front of the line before time ran out.

With just seconds remaining until the 6 o'clock gun, Bobby Rahal made it to the front of the qualifying line. At 5:59 p.m., he pulled away for his warm up laps. Kevin Cogan (217.230 mph) was now on the bubble. Rahal's first lap was completed at 217.360 mph, just fast enough to bump his way in. However, his second lap dropped to 216.820 mph. His third lap (214.782 mph) was the dagger, and Rahal failed to qualify.

== Carburetion Day ==
The final practice session was held Thursday May 27. Scott Brayton (223.547 mph) set the fastest lap. Nigel Mansell was second, and Raul Boesel third. No incidents were reported, but a few drivers, namely Stan Fox, reported relatively minor mechanical issues.

First alternate Bobby Rahal did not take the opportunity to practice. Paul Tracy was absent for the day, due to the birth of his daughter in Toronto. Emerson Fittipaldi shook down Tracy's car for a handful of practice laps.

=== Pit Stop Contest ===
The elimination rounds for the 17th annual Miller Genuine Draft Pit Stop Contest were held on Thursday May 27. The top three race qualifiers and their respective pit crews were automatically eligible: Arie Luyendyk, Mario Andretti, and Raul Boesel. Two additional quarterfinal spots would be filled by preliminaries scheduled for May 19–20, for a total of five participants. For 1993, a quarterfinal round was added.

On Wednesday May 19, the cars of the Galles-KRACO Racing team made their preliminary runs. The results were Danny Sullivan (11.684 seconds) and Al Unser Jr. (12.259 seconds). On Thursday May 20, seven additional teams made preliminary attempts. The results were as follows: Nigel Mansell (12.437 seconds), Robby Gordon (12.917 seconds), Bobby Rahal (13.210 seconds), Roberto Guerrero (13.455 seconds), Scott Goodyear (14.915 seconds), Tony Bettenhausen (15.103), Jim Crawford (18.508 seconds). Unser Jr. and Sullivan held on to advance as the quarterfinal qualifiers.

Al Unser Jr. defeated Danny Sullivan to reach the semifinals. Unser then defeated Arie Luyendyk to advance to the final round. Mario Andretti won the other semifinal match after Raul Boesel stalled in his pit. In the final round match, Al Unser Jr., led by chief mechanic Owen Snyder defeated Andretti, led by chief mechanic John Simmonds. It was third victory in the event for Unser and Galles.

Quarterfinals
3	Al Unser Jr. (Galles-KRACO Racing)	14.005
9	Danny Sullivan (Galles-KRACO Racing)	16.564

Semifinals
3	Al Unser Jr. (Galles-KRACO Racing)	16.667
10	Arie Luyendyk (Chip Ganassi Racing)	18.624
6	Mario Andretti (Newman/Haas Racing)	14.922
9	Raul Boesel (Dick Simon Racing)	Stalled

Finals
3	Al Unser Jr. (Galles-KRACO Racing)	13.118
6	Mario Andretti (Newman/Haas Racing)	16.104

== Starting grid ==
Row	Inside		Middle		Outside	
1	10	(Netherlands) Arie Luyendyk W	6	(United States) Mario Andretti W	9	(Brazil) Raul Boesel
2	2	(Canada) Scott Goodyear	3	(United States) Al Unser Jr. W	16	(Sweden) Stefan Johansson R
3	12	(Canada) Paul Tracy	5	(United Kingdom) Nigel Mansell R	4	(Brazil) Emerson Fittipaldi W
4	40	(Colombia) Roberto Guerrero	22	(United States) Scott Brayton	7	(United States) Danny Sullivan W
5	77	(Brazil) Nelson Piquet R	11	(United States) Kevin Cogan	36	(France) Stéphan Grégoire R
6	21	(United States) Jeff Andretti	8	(Italy) Teo Fabi	51	(United States) Gary Bettenhausen
7	18	(United States) Jimmy Vasser	91	(United States) Stan Fox	90	(United States) Lyn St. James
8	76	(United States) Tony Bettenhausen Jr.	80	(United States) Al Unser W	84	(United States) John Andretti
9	41	(United States) Robby Gordon R	15	(Japan) Hiro Matsushita	66	(United States) Dominic Dobson
10	50	(United States) Davy Jones	27	(Australia) Geoff Brabham	75	(United States) Willy T. Ribbs
11	60	(United Kingdom) Jim Crawford	92	(Belgium) Didier Theys	59	(United States) Eddie Cheever

=== Alternates ===
- First alternate: (United States) Mark Smith R (#25, #25T, #81) – Bumped, #81 No attempt made
- Second alternate: (United States) Bobby Rahal (#1, #1T) – #1 Bumped, #1T too slow

=== Failed to Qualify ===
- (France) Olivier Grouillard R (#29, #18T) – #29 Bumped, 18T did not attempt to qualify
- (United States) Scott Pruett (#45, #46) – #45 Bumped, #46 too slow
- (Belgium) Éric Bachelart (#19T, #32, #39) – #19T Too Slow, #32 Practice Crash, #39 Too slow
- (United States) Rocky Moran (#43) – Too slow
- (United States) John Paul Jr. (#93) – Blown engine during qualifications
- (United States) Buddy Lazier (#20) – Blown engine during qualifications
- (Canada) Ross Bentley (#39) R – Injured, car fire during practice
- (United States) Robbie Buhl (#19, 19T) – Injured, practice crash
- (United States) A. J. Foyt (#14) – retired on pole day morning, did not attempt to qualify
- (United States) Mike Groff ( #1T, #26) – #1T Practice only, #26 did not practice or attempt to qualify
- (United States) Brian Bonner (#98) – did not attempt to qualify

== Race recap ==
=== Pre-race ===
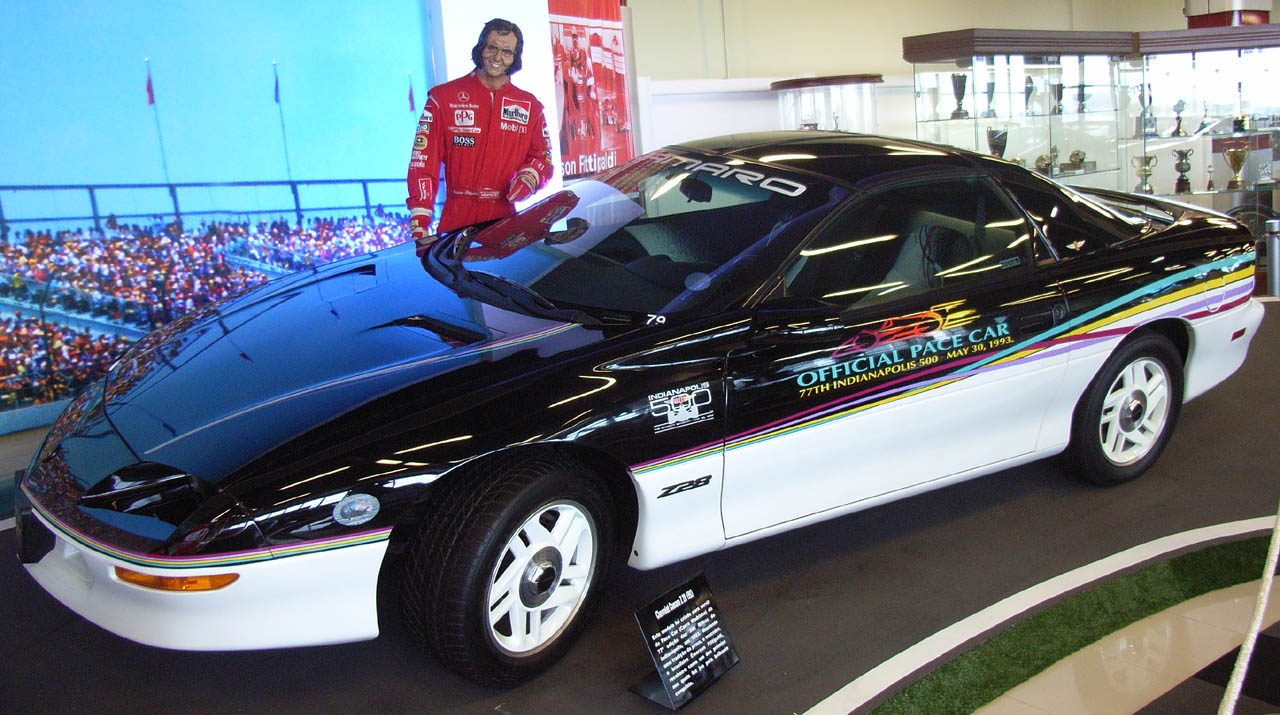
1993 Chevrolet Camaro pace car.

After the tumultuous off-season, and surprising events during time trials, the 500 would line up with several familiar drivers on the sidelines for one reason or another. A. J. Foyt, Rick Mears, Gordon Johncock, and Tom Sneva had retired; Bobby Rahal and Scott Pruett both failed to qualify; and Michael Andretti's commitments in Formula One prevented him from entering the race.

After the miserable cold weather from the previous year, race day dawned sunny and warm. There was pre-race concern about approaching precipitation, and the forecast was questionable. Some teams prepared for a possible rain-shortened race. However, the rain never arrived, and the race was completed without interruption.

=== Start ===
At the green flag, polesitter Arie Luyendyk and Raul Boesel drag-raced down the frontstretch, with Mario Andretti dropping back into third. Boesel got the edge, and grabbed the lead into turn 1. The entire field circulated through the first lap cleanly, and started to pick up the pace. Boesel began lapping the backmarkers on lap 8, meanwhile Andretti moved past Luyendyk to take second place. On lap 16, Jim Crawford spun exiting turn 2. He flat-spotted his tires, but did not make contact. He drove back to the pits, and re-entered the race.

Under the caution most of the leaders pitted. Kevin Cogan stayed out, and inherited the lead. In doing so, Cogan accomplished a rare feat in which the slowest qualifier in the field led lap(s) during the race. In the pits, Raul Boesel was among those who pitted, and in the process, the crew was able to remove a hot dog wrapper that was blocking the radiator inlet. As Boesel was exiting his pit stall, he was momentarily blocked when Scott Goodyear pulled out of his stall. Further down the lane, Mario Andretti slowly pulled out of his pit box, and was ahead of Boesel. Both cars entered the warm up lane together. Boesel was going much faster and slipped by Andretti in the warm up lane. Boesel was unaware and was not informed by the officials that Mario had crossed the blend line first.

After the field went back to green on lap 21, the black flag was displayed for Boesel. A controversial stop-and-go penalty was assessed to Boesel. Confusion hovered over the reason for penalty. Owner Dick Simon was initially informed it was for speeding in the pits, but then it was changed to passing under the yellow. Boesel darted into the pits to serve the penalty, and fell all the way back to the rear of the field. He lost a lap in the process.

=== First half ===
With Al Unser, Sr. leading on lap 31, Danny Sullivan, suffering from a pushing condition, went high in turn three and smacked the outside wall. A piece of the suspension pierced through the side of the tub, and narrowly missed puncturing his leg. Sullivan would not return as a driver in 1994, but did one last time in 1995. Nelson Piquet, who returned to Indy after being seriously injured in pre-race practice the previous year, dropped out with a blown engine.

Mario Andretti led the field back to green on lap 36, Arie Luyendyk ran second, and Emerson Fittipaldi third. Mario led comfortably for the next 15 laps. On lap 47, the leaders approached traffic, and Luyendyk passed Andretti to take the lead into turn one. Nigel Mansell began showing strength, passing Fittipaldi for third, then closing in his teammate Mario Andretti in second. Down the main stretch on lap 50, Mansell dove inside Mario for position, but Mario held him off, sweeping down in front in turn 1. Three laps later, Mansell finally got by Mario in turn 1, after a hot pursuit. Andretti pitted one lap later. On lap 56, Mansell passed Luyendyk coming out of turn 2 to take the lead for the first time. However, Mansell ducked into the pits on that same lap, and was not credited with leading a lap yet.

During the sequence of green flag pit stops, the lead changed hands several times. After all of the leaders pitted, Nigel Mansell took over the lead.

The yellow came out for debris on lap 89, and after pit stops, Mario Andretti was back in the lead. Nigel Mansell overshot his pit stall, and his crew had to wheel him back to administer service. Mansell dropped to 6th place after a 40-second pit stop.

The green came out on lap 94, but only lasted two laps. Scott Brayton and Paul Tracy tangled entering turn three, and Tracy was forced into the outside wall. Brayton came down on Tracy, pinching him to the grass, and clipped his front wheel.

=== Second half ===
On lap 128, the only multi-car crash of the day occurred. Jeff Andretti and Roberto Guerrero came together in turn three, with both cars crashing out. Leader Mario Andretti ducked into the pits, however, he entered the pit lane when it was closed. He was given the black flag and assessed a stop-and-go penalty. After the shuffle, Al Unser Jr. took over the lead, with Andretti second. Meanwhile, Raul Boesel was now back on the lead lap in 8th place.

Robby Gordon brought out the yellow on lap 169 when he stalled on the track with a broken gearbox. Under the yellow, Raul Boesel entered the pits while they were closed, and was assessed a stop-and-go penalty; however, he did not lose any considerable track position.

After the shuffle from the final sequence of pit stops, Nigel Mansell was now back in the lead, with Emerson Fittipaldi second, and Arie Luyendyk third.

=== Finish ===
On lap 182, the yellow came out when Lyn St. James stalled in turn 4. Nigel Mansell was leading Emerson Fittipaldi and Arie Luyendyk. On lap 184, the field was ready to go back to green. Mansell, driving in his first-ever Indy car oval race, was inexperienced in restarts, and was too hesitant bringing the field back to green. He exited turn four too slow, and immediately Fittipaldi and Luyendyk were on his rear bumper. Mansell realized he was a sitting duck, and swept to the inside of the track to attempt to block. Fittipaldi quickly diced around, and got by on the outside to take the lead. Going into turn one, Luyendyk precariously swept by Mansell on the outside and took over second place.

With Fittipaldi pulling away, the laps dwindled down, and Mansell's chances for victory started to slip away. On lap 192, Mansell slid high exiting turn two, and "whitewalled" the outside wall. A caution came out for the contact, but Mansell stayed out on the track. His suspension suffered minor damage, but he continued.

The green flag came out for the final time with 5 laps to go. Emerson Fittipaldi got the jump on the restart, and pulled away to a comfortable lead. Fittipaldi won his second Indy 500 by 2.8 seconds over Arie Luyendyk. Nigel Mansell held on to finish third, while Raul Boesel worked his way all the way back to the front-runners to come home fourth.

Nigel Mansell became the first rookie to finish the full 500 miles since Donnie Allison in 1970. He won the rookie of the year award, and led a total of 34 laps during the race. His late-race miscue cost him two positions, and was largely chalked up as a 'rookie mistake.' During post-race interviews, Mansell claimed he was trying to follow the rules, waiting for the green flag to come out before he accelerated, and he was surprised that Fittipaldi and Luyendyk had caught up such ground on him so quickly. He claimed that "everybody, if you like, cheats on the restarts, and I'm trying to do it by the rules...and I lost the lead..." However, he did not protest the results, and was pleased with his performance. Later that same year, Mansell won the Michigan 500 and went on to win the 1993 CART IndyCar championship. Mansell was honored with the Driver of the Year award, the Autosport International Racing Driver Award and an ESPY.

=== Post race ===
Race winner Emerson Fittipaldi, who previously won in 1989 pulled into victory lane to celebrate his win with team owner Roger Penske. It would be the final time a driver celebrated in the "hydraulic lift" version of Indy's victory lane, as a new one was built for 1994. As Fittipaldi emerged from the cockpit, he immediately began the traditional winner's interview, being given by Jack Arute live on ABC-TV. Fittipaldi broke a decades-old tradition, and chose not to drink the ceremonial milk in victory lane, a tradition that dates back to 1936. Fittipaldi instead controversially drank orange juice, which he himself provided, in order to promote the Brazilian citrus industry (Fittipaldi himself owned a citrus farm which produced orange juice). Arute immediately shifted his questioning to the milk snub, and the exchange on live television went as follows:

Fittipaldi: "No, I'm not going to have the milk."
Arute: "Now there's a first! Emerson, you're not going to drink the milk?"
Fittipaldi: "Well, I'm going to drink the orange juice, that's my producer, and I'm going to help this time orange juice. I produce orange juice."
Arute: "Back in São Paulo, Brazil he produces the orange juice, so he's going to go that way."

Fittipaldi refused to even hold the milk bottle, pushing it away at least three times from the presenter. After the interview was concluded, and after television cameras had been turned off, Fittipaldi finally did take a sip from the bottle of milk at the direction of his owner Roger Penske, however, not before a controversy boiled. Fan reaction to the snub was highly negative, and they charged Fittipaldi with breaking the popular and long-standing Indy tradition for personal gain. He quickly gained hecklers, and was booed the following week during driver introductions at Milwaukee. A few days after the race, Fittipaldi issued an apology statement, and donated the $5,000 prize from the American Dairy Association of Indiana to charity.

== Box score ==
Finish	Start	No.	Driver	Team	Qual.	Chassis	Engine	Laps	Status
1	9	4	(Brazil) Emerson Fittipaldi W	Team Penske	220.150	Penske PC-22	Ilmor-Chevrolet C	200	157.207 mph
2	1	10	(Netherlands) Arie Luyendyk W	Chip Ganassi Racing	223.967	Lola T93/00	Ford-Cosworth XB	200	+2.862
3	8	5	(United Kingdom) Nigel Mansell R	Newman/Haas Racing	220.255	Lola T93/00	Ford-Cosworth XB	200	+4.237
4	3	9	(Brazil) Raul Boesel	Dick Simon Racing	222.379	Lola T93/00	Ford-Cosworth XB	200	+4.782
5	2	6	(United States) Mario Andretti W	Newman/Haas Racing	223.414	Lola T93/00	Ford-Cosworth XB	200	+5.418
6	11	22	(United States) Scott Brayton	Dick Simon Racing	219.637	Lola T93/00	Ford-Cosworth XB	200	+6.540
7	4	2	(Canada) Scott Goodyear	Walker Racing	222.344	Lola T93/00	Ford-Cosworth XB	200	+7.917
8	5	3	(United States) Al Unser Jr. W	Galles Racing	221.773	Lola T93/00	Ilmor-Chevrolet C	200	+9.964
9	17	8	(Italy) Teo Fabi	Jim Hall Racing	220.514	Lola T93/00	Ilmor-Chevrolet C	200	+17.441
10	24	84	(United States) John Andretti	A. J. Foyt Enterprises	221.746	Lola T92/00	Ford-Cosworth XB	200	+17.730
11	6	16	(Sweden) Stefan Johansson R	Bettenhausen Racing	220.824	Penske PC-22	Ilmor-Chevrolet C	199	Running
12	23	80	(United States) Al Unser W	King Racing	217.453	Lola T93/00	Ilmor-Chevrolet C	199	Running
13	19	18	(United States) Jimmy Vasser	Hayhoe Racing	218.968	Lola T92/00	Ford-Cosworth XB	198	Running
14	14	11	(United States) Kevin Cogan	Galles Racing	217.230	Lola T93/00	Ilmor-Chevrolet C	198	Running
15	28	50	(United States) Davy Jones	Euromotorsport	218.416	Lola T92/00	Ilmor-Chevrolet A	197	Running
16	33	59	(United States) Eddie Cheever	Team Menard	217.599	Lola T92/00	Buick V-6	197	Running
17	18	51	(United States) Gary Bettenhausen	Team Menard	220.380	Lola T93/00	Menard V-6	197	Running
18	26	15	(Japan) Hiro Matsushita	Walker Racing	219.950	Lola T93/00	Ford-Cosworth XB	197	Running
19	15	36	(France) Stéphan Grégoire R	Formula Project Engineering	220.851	Lola T92/00	Ilmor-Chevrolet B	195	Running
20	22	76	(United States) Tony Bettenhausen Jr.	Bettenhausen Racing	218.034	Penske PC-22	Ilmor-Chevrolet C	195	Running
21	30	75	(United States) Willy T. Ribbs	Walker Racing	217.711	Lola T92/00	Ford-Cosworth XB	194	Running
22	32	92	(Belgium) Didier Theys	Hemelgarn Racing	217.752	Lola T92/00	Buick V-6	193	Running
23	27	66	(United States) Dominic Dobson	Burns Racing	218.776	Galmer 92	Ilmor-Chevrolet A	193	Running
24	31	60	(United Kingdom) Jim Crawford	King Racing	217.612	Lola T93/00	Ilmor-Chevrolet C	192	Running
25	21	90	(United States) Lyn St. James	Dick Simon Racing	218.042	Lola T93/00	Ford-Cosworth XB	176	Gearbox
26	29	27	(Australia) Geoff Brabham	Team Menard	217.800	Lola T93/00	Menard V-6	174	Engine
27	25	41	(United States) Robby Gordon R	A. J. Foyt Enterprises	220.085	Lola T93/00	Ford-Cosworth XB	165	Gearbox
28	10	40	(Colombia) Roberto Guerrero	King Racing	219.645	Lola T93/00	Ilmor-Chevrolet C	125	Crash T3
29	16	21	(United States) Jeff Andretti	Pagan Racing	220.572	Lola T92/00	Buick V-6	124	Crash T3
30	7	12	(Canada) Paul Tracy	Team Penske	220.298	Penske PC-22	Ilmor-Chevrolet C	94	Crash T3
31	20	91	(United States) Stan Fox	Hemelgarn Racing	218.765	Lola T91/00	Buick V-6	64	Engine
32	13	77	(Brazil) Nelson Piquet R	Team Menard	217.949	Lola T93/00	Menard V-6	38	Engine
33	12	7	(United States) Danny Sullivan W	Galles Racing	219.428	Lola T93/00	Ilmor-Chevrolet C	29	Crash T3

W Former Indianapolis 500 winner

R Indianapolis 500 Rookie

All cars utilized Goodyear tires.

=== Race statistics ===
There were 23 lead changes involving a race record 12 different leaders. Kevin Cogan, the slowest qualifier, led 3 laps, the first time since 1923 that the slowest driver in the field led a lap at Indy.

The ten cars finishing on the lead lap was the most in Indy history up to that point, although it was not the most cars completing the full 500 miles (the record was 16 in 1959). However, since the implementation of the "pack-up" rule during caution periods in 1979, and the fact that extra time to complete the 500 miles was eliminated in the mid-1970s, ten cars completing 500 miles on the lead lap broke the CART-era record of four (1980, 1986, 1992).

The field completed a then race-record 5,733 out of a possible 6,600 laps (86.9%) for a full 500-mile race; a record that stood until 2013.

Lap Leaders
Laps	Leader
1–17	Raul Boesel
18	Stéphan Grégoire
19–22	Kevin Cogan
23–31	Al Unser Sr.
32–46	Mario Andretti
47–57	Arie Luyendyk
58–63	Al Unser Sr.
64–65	John Andretti
66–67	Robby Gordon
68–69	Scott Goodyear
70–91	Nigel Mansell
92–128	Mario Andretti
129–130	Nigel Mansell
131–132	Arie Luyendyk
133	Mario Andretti
134	Arie Luyendyk
135–151	Al Unser Jr.
152–168	Mario Andretti
169–171	Scott Goodyear
172	Mario Andretti
173	Raul Boesel
174	Mario Andretti
175–184	Nigel Mansell
185–200	Emerson Fittipaldi

Total laps led
Driver	Laps
Mario Andretti	72
Nigel Mansell	34
Raul Boesel	18
Al Unser Jr.	17
Emerson Fittipaldi	16
Al Unser Sr.	15
Arie Luyendyk	14
Scott Goodyear	5
Kevin Cogan	4
John Andretti	2
Robby Gordon	2
Stéphan Grégoire	1

Cautions: 8 for 49 laps
Laps	Reason
16–20	Jim Crawford spin on backstretch
31–37	Danny Sullivan crash in turn 3
89–93	Debris
95–103	Paul Tracy crash in turn 3
128–138	Jeff Andretti, Roberto Guerrero crash in turn 3
169–174	Robby Gordon stalled on track
183–185	Lyn St. James stalled on track
193–195	Nigel Mansell brushed wall in turn 2

== Broadcasting ==
=== Radio ===
The race was carried live on the IMS Radio Network. Bob Jenkins served as chief announcer for the fourth year. Johnny Rutherford, who missed the broadcast in 1992, returned to serve as "driver expert."

Besides Rutherford, the rest of the crew remained the same from 1991 to 1992.

For the first time, the radio network did not feature a separate live interview with the winner from victory lane. The network simulcast the ABC-TV live interview, which would occur immediately as the driver arrives in victory lane. This allowed the radio audience to hear the first words spoken by the winner, increasing the spontaneity, and prevented the driver from having to repeat an entire interview for a second audience.

Indianapolis Motor Speedway Radio Network
Booth Announcers	Turn Reporters	Pit/garage reporters
Chief Announcer: Bob Jenkins; Driver expert: Johnny Rutherford; Statistician: Howdy Bell; Historian: Donald Davidson	Turn 1: Jerry Baker; Turn 2: Gary Lee; Turn 3: Larry Henry; Turn 4: Bob Lamey	Bob Forbes (north pits); Brian Hammons (north-center pits); Sally Larvick (south-center pits); Chris McClure (south pits); Chuck Marlowe (garages)

=== Television ===
The race was carried live flag-to-flag coverage in the United States on ABC Sports. Paul Page served as host and play-by-play announcer, joined by color commentators Bobby Unser and Sam Posey. A slight change came about for 1993. Bobby Unser left the announcing booth, and reported from the turn two position on top of the luxury suites. The move was supposedly to offer a fresh perspective, but others believed it was to separate Unser and Posey, who were known to engage in heated exchanges and debates on-air.

Besides Unser moving his reporting position, the same exact crew, and respective duties, from 1990 to 1992 returned. Bobby Rahal, who failed to qualify for the 1993 race, was invited to be part of the crew, but declined. Two new camera angles debuted, with scaffolding towers erected inside the turns. This was done in part due to construction of new grandstands at the north end of the track and due to the outer retaining fence having been raised. Producers wanted an unobstructed view of the track, and for 1993, desirable camera locations were unavailable on the outside.

ABC Television
Booth Announcers	Pit/garage reporters
Host/Announcer: Paul Page; Color: Sam Posey; Color/Turn 2: Bobby Unser	Jack Arute; Gary Gerould; Dr. Jerry Punch

== 1992–93 USAC Gold Crown Championship ==
1992–93 USAC Championship Car season
- USAC Gold Crown Championship

Season
- Races: 1

Awards
- National champion: (Brazil) Emerson Fittipaldi

The 1992–93 USAC Gold Crown Championship season consisted of one sanctioned race. The schedule was based on a split-calendar, beginning in June 1992 and running through May 1993. Starting in 1981, USAC scaled back their participation in top-level Indy car racing, and ultimately ceased sanctioning races outside of the Indianapolis 500 following their 1983–84 season. Subsequently, the Gold Crown Championship would consist of only one event annually; the winner of the Indianapolis 500 would be the de facto Gold Crown champion, as it was their lone points-paying event. The preeminent national championship season was instead sanctioned by CART, and the Indy 500 paid championship points separately (on a different scale) toward the CART championship as well.

Emerson Fittipaldi, by virtue of winning the 1993 Indianapolis 500, also won the 1992–93 USAC Championship.

=== Final points standings (Top five) ===
Pos	Driver	INDY (United States)	Pts
1	(Brazil) Emerson Fittipaldi	1	1000
2	(Netherlands) Arie Luyendyk	2	800
3	(United Kingdom) Nigel Mansell	3	700
4	(Brazil) Raul Boesel	4	600
5	(United States) Mario Andretti	5	500

== Notes ==
=== Works cited ===
- 1993 Indianapolis 500 Day-By-Day Trackside Report For the Media
- Indianapolis 500 History: Race & All-Time Stats – Official Site
- 1993 Indianapolis 500 Radio Broadcast, Indianapolis Motor Speedway Radio Network

== Bibliography ==
- Indy Review, Volume 3: 77th Indianapolis 500. Osceola, WI: Indy 500 Publications / Indianapolis Motor Speedway Corporation. 1993. ISBN 978-1-880526-02-6.

1992 Indianapolis 500; Al Unser Jr.	1993 Indianapolis 500; Emerson Fittipaldi	1994 Indianapolis 500; Al Unser Jr.
