= 1993 Australian FAI IndyCar Grand Prix =

Coordinates: 27°59′17.9″S 153°25′42.1″E

(Australia) 1993 Surfers Paradise
Race details
- Race 1 of 16 in the 1993 IndyCar season
- Map of the track
- Date: 21 March, 1993
- Official name: 1993 Australian FAI IndyCar Grand Prix
- Location: Surfers Paradise Street Circuit; Queensland, Australia
- Course: Temporary Street Circuit; 2.794 mi / 4.496 km
- Distance: 65 laps 181.610 mi / 292.240 km

Pole position
- Driver: (United Kingdom) Nigel Mansell (Newman-Haas Racing)
- Time: 1:38.555

Fastest lap
- Driver: (United Kingdom) Nigel Mansell (Newman-Haas Racing)
- Time: 1:39.67 (on lap of 65)

Podium
- First: (United Kingdom) Nigel Mansell (Newman-Haas Racing)
- Second: (Brazil) Emerson Fittipaldi (Marlboro Team Penske)
- Third: (United States) Robby Gordon (Copenhagen Racing)

The 1993 Australian FAI IndyCar Grand Prix was the opening round of the 1993 CART World Series season, held on 21 March 1993 on the Surfers Paradise Street Circuit, Australia. The race was won by series debutant Nigel Mansell, the reigning Formula One World Champion from 1992. Mansell also became the first person to win their first IndyCar race since Graham Hill had won the 1966 Indianapolis 500.

Due to the appearance of Mansell in the CART World Series, over 800 press passes were given out by the race organisers. This was second only in number for the series to the amount of press at the Indianapolis 500.

== Qualifying results ==
Pos	Nat	Name	Team	Car	Time
1	(United Kingdom)	Nigel Mansell	Newman-Haas Racing	Lola T93/06 Ford XB Cosworth	1:38.555
2	(Brazil)	Emerson Fittipaldi	Team Penske	Penske PC-22-93 Chevrolet-Ilmor C	1:38.882
3	(Canada)	Paul Tracy	Team Penske	Penske PC-22-93 Chevrolet-Ilmor C	1:39.171
4	(United States)	Robby Gordon	A. J. Foyt Enterprises	Lola T92/00 Ford XB Cosworth	1:39.435
5	(Netherlands)	Arie Luyendyk	Chip Ganassi Racing	Lola T93/06 Ford XB Cosworth	1:39.635
6	(United States)	Mario Andretti	Newman-Haas Racing	Lola T93/06 Ford XB Cosworth	1:39.739
7	(Canada)	Scott Goodyear	Walker Motorsport	Lola T93/06 Ford XB Cosworth	1:40.127
8	(Brazil)	Raul Boesel	Dick Simon Racing	Lola T93/06 Ford XB Cosworth	1:40.488
9	(United States)	Jimmy Vasser	Hayhoe Racing	Lola T92/00 Chevrolet-Ilmor A	1:40.645
10	(United States)	Scott Brayton	Dick Simon Racing	Lola T93/06 Ford XB Cosworth	1:40.980
11	(United States)	Mark Smith	Arciero Racing	Penske PC21-92 Chevrolet-Ilmor B	1:40.992
12	(Italy)	Teo Fabi	Racing Team VDS	Lola T93/07 Chevrolet-Ilmor C	1:41.066
13	(United States)	Bobby Rahal	Rahal-Hogan Racing	Rahal-Hogan RH-001 Chevrolet-Ilmor C	1:41.096
14	(United States)	Al Unser Jr.	Galles Racing	Lola T93/07 Chevrolet-Ilmor C	1:41.180
15	(Colombia)	Roberto Guerrero	King Racing	Lola T93/07 Chevrolet-Ilmor C	1:41.481
16	(United States)	Eddie Cheever	Turley Motorsports	Penske PC21-92 Chevrolet-Ilmor B	1:41.848
17	(United States)	Robbie Buhl	Dale Coyne Racing	Lola T92/00 Chevrolet-Ilmor A	1:43.311
18	(Sweden)	Stefan Johansson	Bettenhausen Motorsports	Penske PC-22-93 Chevrolet-Ilmor C	1:43.908
19	(Switzerland)	Andrea Chiesa	Euromotorsport	Lola T92/00 Cosworth DFS	1:43.985
20	(Australia)	Gary Brabham	Split Cycle Racing	Lola T92/00 Chevrolet-Ilmor A	1:44.351
21	(United States)	Danny Sullivan	Galles Racing	Lola T93/07 Chevrolet-Ilmor C	1:44.958
22	(Canada)	Ross Bentley	Dale Coyne Racing	Lola T92/00 Chevrolet-Ilmor A	1:45.213
23	(Italy)	Andrea Montermini	Dale Coyne Racing	Lola T92/00 Chevrolet-Ilmor A	1:46.224
24	(Japan)	Hiro Matsushita	Walker Motorsport	Lola T93/06 Ford XB Cosworth	1:46.342
25	(United States)	Buddy Lazier	Leader Cards Racing	Lola T91/00 Chevrolet-Ilmor A	1:46.970
26	(Brazil)	Marco Greco	International Sport	Lola T92/00 Chevrolet-Ilmor A	1:48.068

== Race ==
Pos	No	Driver	Team	Laps	Time/retired	Grid	Points
1	5	(United Kingdom) Nigel Mansell	Newman-Haas Racing	65	1:52:02.886	1	21
2	4	(Brazil) Emerson Fittipaldi	Team Penske	65	+5.1 secs	2	17
3	14	(United States) Robby Gordon	A. J. Foyt Enterprises	65	+10.7 secs	4	14
4	6	(United States) Mario Andretti	Newman-Haas Racing	65	+25.4 secs	6	12
5	10	(Netherlands) Arie Luyendyk	Chip Ganassi Racing	65	+25.4 secs	5	10
6	1	(United States) Bobby Rahal	Rahal-Hogan Racing	64	+ 1 lap	13	8
7	69	(United States) Eddie Cheever	Turley Motorsports	64	+ 1 lap	13	6
8	9	(Brazil) Raul Boesel	Dick Simon Racing	64	+ 1 lap	8	5
9	8	(Italy) Teo Fabi	Racing Team VDS	64	+ 1 lap	12	4
10	2	(Canada) Scott Goodyear	Walker Motorsport	63	+ 2 laps	7	3
11	15	(Japan) Hiro Matsushita	Walker Motorsport	63	+ 2 laps	24	2
12	16	(Sweden) Stefan Johansson	Bettenhausen Racing	63	+ 2 laps	18	1
13	18	(United States) Danny Sullivan	Galles Racing	62	+ 3 laps	21	
14	90	(Australia) Gary Brabham	Split Cycle Racing	62	+ 3 laps	20	
15	3	(United States) Al Unser Jr.	Galles Racing	62	+ 3 laps	14	
16	22	(United States) Scott Brayton	Dick Simon Racing	61	+ 4 laps	14	
17	39	(Canada) Ross Bentley	Dale Coyne Racing	56	+ 9 laps	22	
18	25	(United States) Mark Smith	Arciero Racing	50	+ 15 laps	11	
19	40	(Colombia) Roberto Guerrero	King Racing	49	Transmission	15	
20	20	(United States) Buddy Lazier	Leader Cards Racing	35	Suspension	25	
21	12	(Canada) Paul Tracy	Team Penske	30	Electrical	3	
22	25	(Brazil) Marco Greco	International Sport	18	Contact	26	
23	19	(United States) Robbie Buhl	Dale Coyne Racing	15	Transmission	17	
24	18	(United States) Jimmy Vasser	Hayhoe Racing	12	Contact	9	
25	50	(Italy) Andrea Montermini	Dale Coyne Racing	9	Fuel pressure	23	
26	42	(Switzerland) Andrea Chiesa	Euromotorsport	2	Electrical	19	

== Notes ==
- Average Speed: 97.284 mph (156.563 km/h)
- Lead changes: 6 among 2 drivers

Lap Leaders
Laps	Leader
1-15	Emerson Fittipaldi
16-18	Nigel Mansell
19-21	Emerson Fittipaldi
22-29	Nigel Mansell
30-44	Emerson Fittipaldi
45-65	Nigel Mansell

== Standings after the race ==
Drivers' Championship standings

Pos	Driver	Points
1	(United Kingdom) Nigel Mansell	21
2	(Brazil) Emerson Fittipaldi	17
3	(United States) Robby Gordon	14
4	(United States) Mario Andretti	12
5	(Netherlands) Arie Luyendyk	10

Previous race:	PPG Indy Car World Series; 1993 season	Next race: 1993 Valvoline 200
Previous race: 1992 Daikyo IndyCar Grand Prix	1993 Australian FAI IndyCar Grand Prix	Next race: 1994 Australian FAI Indycar Grand Prix
