= 1994 Michigan 500 =

Coordinates: 42°03′58.68″N 84°14′29.18″W

(United States) 1994 Michigan 500
Race details
- Race 10 of 16 in the 1994 CART season
- Date: July 31, 1994
- Official name: 1994 Marlboro 500
- Location: Michigan International Speedway, Brooklyn, Michigan, United States
- Course: Permanent racing facility 2.000 mi / 3.219 km
- Distance: 250 laps 500.000 mi / 804.672 km
- Weather: Partly Cloudy with temperatures up to 83 °F (28 °C); wind speeds reaching up to 14 miles per hour (23 km/h)

Pole position
- Driver: (United Kingdom) Nigel Mansell (Newman-Haas Racing)
- Time: 233.738 mph (376.165 km/h)

Podium
- First: (Canada) Scott Goodyear (King Racing)
- Second: (Netherlands) Arie Luyendyk (Indy Regency Racing)
- Third: (United States) Dominic Dobson (PacWest Racing)

The 1994 Michigan 500, the fourteenth running of the event, was held at the Michigan International Speedway in Brooklyn, Michigan, on Sunday, July 31, 1994. Branded as the 1994 Marlboro 500 for sponsorship reasons, the race was won by Scott Goodyear, his second Michigan 500 win. It was race number 10 of 16 of the 1994 PPG IndyCar World Series.

== Background ==
After winning the 1993 Michigan 500, Nigel Mansell won the 1993 CART championship. Mansell returned to team up again with Mario Andretti at Newman/Haas Racing. Andretti embarked on a yearlong Arrivederci Mario tour, announcing he would retire at the conclusion of the 1994 CART season. Penske Racing expanded to a three-car team for 1994, adding Al Unser Jr. Unser won the 1994 Indianapolis 500.

After a dismal season in Formula One, Michael Andretti returned to Indy car racing for 1994, signing with Chip Ganassi Racing. Andretti won the season opening Australian Grand Prix at Surfers Paradise. It was the first Indy car win for Ganassi, as well as the first win for the Reynard chassis (in its Indy car debut). Rahal-Hogan Racing, with drivers Bobby Rahal and Mike Groff, debuted the first Honda Indy car engine, the iron block Honda HRX Indy V-8.

Chevrolet dropped its support of the Ilmor engine program at Indy after 1993. For 1994, the 265C, the 265 C+, and 265D V-8 powerplants were badged the "Ilmor Indy V8."

After its recent scheduling of the first Sunday in August, the Michigan 500 was moved up a week to avoid a conflict with NASCAR's highly anticipated inaugural Brickyard 400.

== Practice and Time Trials ==
In Friday's opening practice, Michael Andretti was fastest with a speed of 234.049 mph. Raul Boesel was second at 233.866 mph. Nigel Mansel was third at 232.785 mph. Mario Andretti was fourth at 232.633 mph.

Alessandro Zampedri blew a tire and made hard impact with the turn four wall. Safety crews took 14 minutes to remove him from the car. Zampedri suffered a bruised liver, broken right hip socket, and cuts to his right hand.

In the cool conditions of Saturday morning practice, Nigel Mansell ran a lap with a speed of 235.629 mph.

In time trials, Nigel Mansell won the pole with a speed of 233.738 mph. Raul Boesel was second fastest with a speed of 232.672 mph. Starting from the outside of the front row was Michael Andretti at 232.543 mph.

An excited Mansell declared, "This is the most significant pole I've had in my career, and it's for this reason: it's the fastest circuit in the world."

On Saturday, the International Race of Champions competed at Michigan. Al Unser Jr. won the 100 mile race. Unser and Scott Pruett were the only two drivers to compete in IROC and the Michigan 500.

== Race ==
The attendance for the Marlboro 500 was estimated at 80,000 spectators, an increase of 30,000 from its level in 1991.

For the first time since 1990, the race began with the cars lined up in rows of three. CART director of competition Wally Dallenbach explained the two reasons why it returned was "one, by popular demand, they want to see it back. Second, with 25 or 26 cars in the past, we spread em out a little bit so it would look better."

Nigel Mansell looked for a repeat of his domination the year prior and led the first 26 laps. Mansell was the first of many contenders to drop out of the race when a jammed throttle sidelined him after completing 35 laps. Mansell's retirement gave the lead to Michael Andretti who led the next 40 laps.

On lap 67, race-leader Michael Andretti crashed. Raul Boesel inherited the lead and led past the halfway point. In his last Michigan 500, Mario Andretti retired from the race with a blown engine while running second on lap 121. Running fourth on lap 170, Scott Goodyear ran out of fuel exiting turn two and coasted back to the pits. Al Unser Jr. spent time leading the race as well.

The race appeared to be a battle for the win between Boesel and Unser. Boesel passed Unser for the lead shortly after a restart on lap 190 and built a several second lead. After leading 120 laps, Boesel's engine blew with 25 laps remaining and he retired from the race. He was seeking the first win for both himself and the Dick Simon Racing team.

Boesel's engine failure gave the lead to Unser Jr, who now had a one lap advantage over the second place car. With 20 laps to go, Unser suffered an engine failure and retired after leading for a total of 38 laps.

Recovering from when he ran out of fuel, Scott Goodyear inherited the lead when Unser dropped out. Goodyear led the final 20 laps and won his second Michigan 500 by one lap over Arie Luyendyk.

Goodyear's average speed was 159.8 mph. Goodyear's best finish of the 1994 season entering Michigan had been 10th. It was the only CART win for King Racing which closed at the end of 1994.

== Box score ==
Finish	Grid	No	Name	Team	Chassis	Engine	Laps	Time/Status	Led	Points
1	12	40	(Canada) Scott Goodyear	King Racing	Lola T94/00	Ford-Cosworth	250	3:07:44.099	26	20
2	26	28	(Netherlands) Arie Luyendyk	Indy Regency Racing	Lola T94/00	Ilmor	249	+1 Lap	0	16
3	9	17	(United States) Dominic Dobson	PacWest Racing	Lola T94/00	Ford-Cosworth	248	+2 Laps	0	14
4	8	11	(Italy) Teo Fabi	Hall Racing	Reynard 94I	Ilmor	246	+4 Laps	0	12
5	25	15	(United States) Mark Smith	Walker Racing	Lola T94/00	Ford-Cosworth	240	+10 Laps	0	10
6	20	22	(Japan) Hiro Matsushita	Dick Simon Racing	Lola T94/00	Ford-Cosworth	239	+11 Laps	0	8
7	23	24	(United States) Willy T. Ribbs	Walker Racing	Lola T94/00	Ford-Cosworth	236	+14 Laps	0	6
8	14	31	(United States) Al Unser Jr.	Marlboro Team Penske	Penske PC-23	Ilmor	231	Engine	38	5
9	2	5	(Brazil) Raul Boesel	Dick Simon Racing	Lola T94/00	Ford-Cosworth	225	Engine	120	5
10	7	2	(Brazil) Emerson Fittipaldi	Marlboro Team Penske	Penske PC-23	Ilmor	209	Engine	0	3
11	15	25	(Brazil) Marco Greco	Dick Simon Racing	Lola T94/00	Ford-Cosworth	195	+55 Laps	0	2
12	18	71	(United States) Scott Sharp	PacWest Racing	Lola T94/00	Ford-Cosworth	185	Driveline	0	1
13	4	9	(United States) Robby Gordon	Walker Racing	Lola T94/00	Ford-Cosworth	182	Engine	0	0
14	6	16	(Sweden) Stefan Johansson	Bettenhausen Motorsports	Penske PC-22	Ilmor	176	Engine	0	0
15	16	88	(Brazil) Maurício Gugelmin	Chip Ganassi Racing	Reynard 94I	Ford-Cosworth	160	Crash	0	0
16	11	3	(Canada) Paul Tracy	Marlboro Team Penske	Penske PC-23	Ilmor	150	Fuel pressure	0	0
17	28	50	(United States) Jeff Wood	Euromotorsport	Lola T92/00	Ilmor	138	Overheating	0	0
18	5	6	(United States) Mario Andretti	Newman/Haas Racing	Lola T94/00	Ford-Cosworth	121	Engine	0	0
19	27	39	(Canada) Ross Bentley	Dale Coyne Racing	Lola T92/00	Ilmor	116	Exhaust	0	0
20	10	12	(Canada) Jacques Villeneuve	Forsythe-Green Racing	Reynard 94I	Ford-Cosworth	76	Crash	0	0
21	19	14	(United States) Eddie Cheever	A. J. Foyt Enterprises	Lola T94/00	Ford-Cosworth	67	Electrical	0	0
22	3	8	(United States) Michael Andretti	Chip Ganassi Racing	Reynard 94I	Ford-Cosworth	66	Crash	40	0
23	13	7	(Mexico) Adrián Fernández	Galles Racing	Reynard 94I	Ilmor	64	Fire	0	0
24	21	23	(United States) Buddy Lazier	Leader Card Racers	Lola T93/00	Ilmor	55	Electrical	0	0
25	17	18	(United States) Jimmy Vasser	Hayhoe Racing	Reynard 94I	Ford-Cosworth	48	Wheel bearing	0	0
26	1	1	(United Kingdom) Nigel Mansell	Newman/Haas Racing	Lola T94/00	Ford-Cosworth	35	Throttle	26	1
27	22	10	(United States) Mike Groff	Rahal-Hogan Racing	Lola T94/00	Honda	24	Clutch	0	0
28	24	4	(United States) Bobby Rahal	Rahal-Hogan Racing	Lola T94/00	Honda	9	Fuel pump	0	0

=== Failed to qualify ===
- (Italy) Alessandro Zampedri (#19)

=== Race statistics ===
Lap Leaders
Laps	Leader
1–26	Nigel Mansell
27–66	Michael Andretti
67	Scott Goodyear
68–120	Raul Boesel
121–124	Al Unser Jr.
125–158	Raul Boesel
159–164	Al Unser Jr.
165–169	Scott Goodyear
170–191	Al Unser Jr.
192–224	Raul Boesel
225–230	Al Unser Jr.
231–250	Scott Goodyear

== Standings after the race ==
Drivers' Championship standings

Pos	Driver	Points
1	(United States) Al Unser Jr.	132
2	(Brazil) Emerson Fittipaldi	103
3	(United States) Michael Andretti	80
4	(United States) Robby Gordon	75
5	(Canada) Paul Tracy	74

== Broadcasting ==
ESPN broadcast the Marlboro 500. Paul Page was the lead announcer and was joined by Derek Daly as color commentator.
