= Dominic Dobson =

American racing driver

- Born: September 14, 1957 (age 69) Stuttgart, Germany

CART
- Years active: 1985–1995
- Teams: Leader Card Racing (1985–1986); Dobson Motorsports (1987–1988); Dale Coyne Racing (1988); Bayside Disposal Racing (1989–1990); Burns Racing Team (1991–1993); PacWest Racing (1993–1995)
- Starts: 55
- Wins: 0
- Podiums: 1
- Poles: 0
- Fastest laps: 0
- Best finish: 18th in 1994

NASCAR FedEx Freight Truck Series career
- 10 races run over 1 year
- Best finish: 35th (1998)
- First race: 1998 Chevy Trucks NASCAR 150 (Phoenix)
- Last race: 1998 Lund Look 275K (Topeka)
| Wins | Top tens | Poles |
|---|---|---|
| 0 | 0 | 0 |

Dominic Dobson (born September 14, 1957) is an American former racing driver who made seven starts in the Indianapolis 500 with a best finish of 12th in 1992, over 60 starts in Championship Auto Racing Teams (CART) competition, with a best finish of third at the Michigan 500 in 1994. Dobson also drove numerous IMSA and other Sport car races, including the 24 Hours of Le Mans in 1989 in a Porsche 962 alongside Jean Alesi and Will Hoy and at Daytona and Sebring, where his best finish was a second place in 1990, co-driving with Sarel van der Merwe and Klaus Ludwig.

== Life and career ==
Dobson was born in Germany, and was raised and currently resides in Seattle, Washington.

During the early 1980s, Dobson worked as an instructor at the Bob Bondurant Driving School, then based at Sears Point Raceway in Sonoma. In the mid-1980s, he started Zephyr Racing with Ron Nelson, another Bondurant instructor. Zephyr originally had its shops in San Rafael, California but moved to a new facility built at Sears Point Raceway in the spring of 1985. Zephyr rented out, maintained, and provided race support for a stable of formula and sports racing cars. Cars were rented on a race-by-race or season long basis. Zephyr's customers competed in SCCA regional and National events as well as the American City racing League.

In the late 1990s, Dobson was involved in a short lived North American Touring Car Championship's Dodge Stratus factory team that ran in conjunction with CART race weekends. He also made ten starts in the Craftsman Truck Series for Dodge in 1998 with a best start of third in Nazareth, Pennsylvania, and a best finish of 17th at Texas Motor Speedway.

From 2000 to 2003, Dobson presided over a multi million dollar collection of historic automobiles, primarily European post-war race cars and rare road cars called the Cavallino Collection. From 2007 to 2015, he was the Chief Development Officer for the LeMay - America's Car Museum, in Tacoma, Washington.

In 2005, Dobson competed in the Baja 100 with co-driver Frank Everett in a Baja Challenge car and in 2015, Dobson won the "Unlimited" Class at the Pikes Peak International Hillclimb and was awarded the coveted "Rookie of the Year" as a result. He continues to race occasionally in vintage car races in the U.S. and abroad.

Dobson owns and operates Dobson Motorsport, a high-end automobile brokerage and management service, and Gerber Motorsport, a Porsche repair and restoration facility, both in Seattle.

== Racing record ==
=== American open–wheel racing results ===
(key)

==== Championship Auto Racing Teams ====
(key) (Races in bold indicate pole position)

| Year | Team | Chassis | Engine | 1 | 2 | 3 | 4 | 5 | 6 | 7 | 8 | 9 | 10 | 11 | 12 | 13 | 14 | 15 | 16 | 17 | Rank | Points | Ref |
|---|---|---|---|---|---|---|---|---|---|---|---|---|---|---|---|---|---|---|---|---|---|---|---|
| 1985 | Leader Card Racing | March 84C | Ford Cosworth DFX | LBH | INDY | MIL | POR | MEA; DNS | CLE; Rpl^{1} | MCH | ROA | POC | MDO | SAN | MCH | | | | | | **38th** | **2** | |
| 1985 | Leader Card Racing | March 85C | Ford Cosworth DFX | | | | | | | | | | | | | LAG; 18 | PHX | MIA; 11 | | | **38th** | **2** | |
| 1986 | Leader Card Racing | March 86C | Ford Cosworth DFX | PHX | LBH; 12 | INDY | MIL | POR; 19 | MEA; 11 | CLE; 18 | TOR; 16 | MCH | POC | MDO; 19 | SAN | MCH | ROA; 18 | LAG; 21 | PHX | MIA; 13 | **31st** | **3** | |
| 1987 | Dobson Motorsports | March 86C | Ford Cosworth DFX | LBH | PHX | INDY; DNQ | MIL | POR | MEA | CLE | TOR | MCH | POC | ROA | MDO | NAZ | LAG | MIA | | | NC | - | |
| 1988 | Dale Coyne Racing | March 86C | Chevrolet V8 | PHX | LBH; 26 | | | | | | | | | | | | | | | | **43rd** | **0** | |
| 1988 | Dobson Motorsports | Lola T87/00 | Ford Cosworth DFX | | | INDY; 18 | MIL | POR; 21 | CLE | TOR | MEA | MCH | POC | MDO | ROA | NAZ | LAG; 18 | MIA | | | **43rd** | **0** | |
| 1989 | Bayside Disposal Racing | Lola T88/00 | Ford Cosworth DFX | PHX; 23 | LBH; 19 | INDY; 18 | MIL | DET; 7 | POR; 18 | CLE | MEA; 17 | TOR; 11 | MCH | POC | MDO | ROA | NAZ | LAG; 11 | | | **19th** | **10** | |
| 1990 | Bayside Disposal Racing | Lola T90/00 | Ford Cosworth DFS | PHX; 23 | LBH; 15 | INDY; 22 | MIL | DET; 26 | POR; 24 | CLE | MEA; 8 | TOR; 8 | MCH | DEN; 25 | VAN; 11 | MDO | ROA; 19 | NAZ | LAG; 20 | | **19th** | **12** | |
| 1991 | Burns Racing Team | Lola T89/00 | Judd AV | SRF | LBH | PHX | INDY; 13 | MIL | DET | POR | CLE | MEA | TOR | MCH | DEN | VAN | MDO | ROA | NAZ | LAG | **35th** | **0** | |
| 1992 | Burns Racing Team | Lola T91/00 | Chevrolet 265A | SRF | PHX | LBH | INDY; 12 | DET | POR | MIL | NHA | TOR | MCH | CLE | ROA | VAN | MDO | NAZ | LAG | | **35th** | **1** | |
| 1993 | Burns Motor Sports | Galmer G92B | Chevrolet 265A | SRF | PHX | LBH | INDY; 23 | MIL | DET | POR | CLE | TOR | MCH | NHA | ROA | | | | | | **39th** | **0** | |
| 1993 | PacWest Racing | Galmer G92B | Chevrolet 265A | | | | | | | | | | | | | VAN; 14 | MDO; DNQ | NAZ | LAG; 18 | | **39th** | **0** | |
| 1994 | PacWest Racing | Lola T94/00 | Ford XB | SRF; 12 | PHX; 24 | LBH; 17 | INDY; 29 | MIL; 13 | DET; 25 | POR; 17 | CLE; 25 | TOR; 11 | MCH; 3 | MDO; 15 | NHA; 6 | VAN; 19 | ROA; 11 | NAZ; 19 | LAG; 10 | | **18th** | **30** | |
| 1995 | PacWest Racing | Reynard 94I | Ford XB | MIA | SRF | PHX | LBH | NAZ | INDY; Wth^{2} | MIL | DET | POR | ROA | TOR | CLE | MCH | MDO | NHA | VAN | LAG | NC | - | |

^{1} Replaced by Phil Krueger
^{2} Did not appear

==== Indianapolis 500 ====
| Year | Chassis | Engine | Start | Finish | Team |
|---|---|---|---|---|---|
| 1987 | March 86C | Ford Cosworth DFX | DNQ | | Dobson Motorsports |
| 1988 | Lola T87/00 | Ford Cosworth DFX | 21 | 18 | Dobson Motorsports |
| 1989 | Lola T88/00 | Ford Cosworth DFX | 29 | 18 | Bayside Disposal Racing |
| 1990 | Lola T90/00 | Ford Cosworth DFS | 11 | 22 | Bayside Disposal Racing |
| 1991 | Lola T89/00 | Judd AV | 30 | 13 | Burns Racing Team |
| 1992 | Lola T91/00 | Chevrolet 265A | 29 | 12 | Burns Racing Team |
| 1993 | Galmer G92B | Chevrolet 265A | 27 | 23 | Burns Motor Sports |
| 1994 | Lola T94/00 | Ford XB | 12 | 29 | PacWest Racing |
| 1995 | Reynard 94I | Ford XB | Wth | | PacWest Racing |

=== Complete 24 Hours of Le Mans results ===
| Year | Team | Co-Drivers | Car | Class | Laps | Pos. | Class Pos. |
|---|---|---|---|---|---|---|---|
| 1989 | (Australia) Team Schuppan | (United Kingdom) Will Hoy (France) Jean Alesi | Porsche 962C | C1 | 69 | DNF | DNF |

=== NASCAR ===
(key) (Bold – Pole position awarded by qualifying time. Italics – Pole position earned by points standings or practice time. * – Most laps led.)

==== Craftsman Truck Series ====
NASCAR Craftsman Truck Series results
| Year | Team | No. | Make | 1 | 2 | 3 | 4 | 5 | 6 | 7 | 8 | 9 | 10 | 11 | 12 | 13 | 14 | 15 | 16 | 17 | 18 | 19 | 20 | 21 | 22 | 23 | 24 | 25 | 26 | 27 | NCTC | Pts | Ref |
|---|---|---|---|---|---|---|---|---|---|---|---|---|---|---|---|---|---|---|---|---|---|---|---|---|---|---|---|---|---|---|---|---|---|
| 1998 | PacWest S/T Motorsports | 78 | Dodge | WDW | HOM; DNQ | PHO; 19 | POR; 29 | EVG; 22 | I70; 25 | GLN; 34 | TEX; 17 | BRI; 35 | MLW; 31 | NZH; 33 | CAL | PPR | IRP | NHA | FLM | NSV | HPT; 23 | LVL | RCH | MEM | GTY | MAR | SON | MMR | PHO | LVS | 35th | 842 | |
