= 1994 PPG Indy Car World Series =

American motorsport season

1994 CART season
- PPG Indy Car World Series
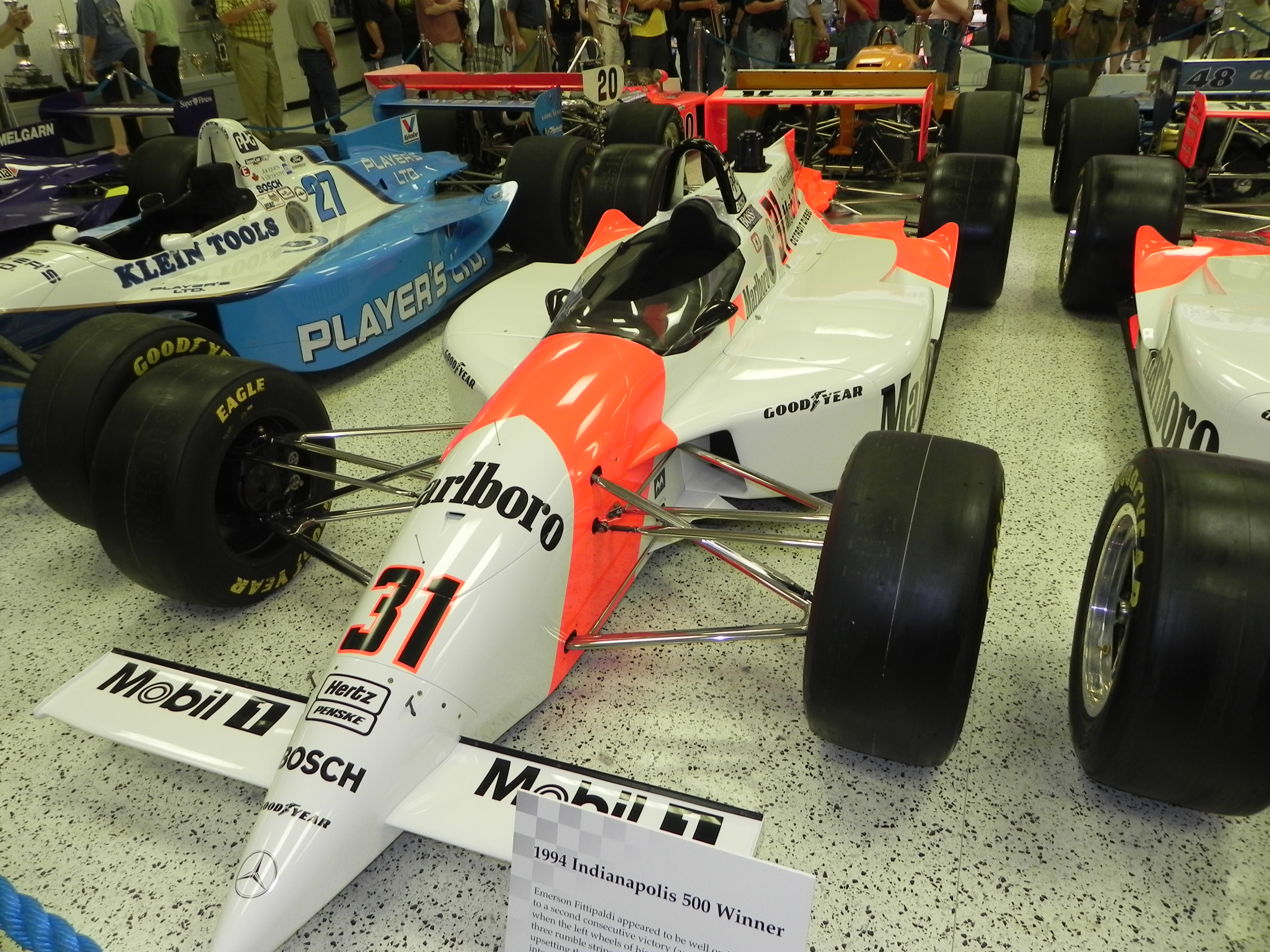
- Al Unser Jr.

Season
- Races: 16
- Start date: March 20
- End date: October 9

Awards
- Drivers' champion: (United States) Al Unser Jr.
- Constructors' Cup: (United States) Penske
- Manufacturers' Cup: (United Kingdom) Ilmor
- Nations' Cup: United States
- Rookie of the Year: (Canada) Jacques Villeneuve
- Indianapolis 500 winner: (United States) Al Unser Jr.

The 1994 PPG Indy Car World Series season was the 16th national championship season of American open wheel racing sanctioned by CART under the name "IndyCar". The season consisted of 16 races. Al Unser Jr. was the national champion, his second CART title, and the rookie of the year was Jacques Villeneuve. The 1994 Indianapolis 500 was sanctioned by USAC, but counted towards the CART points championship. Al Unser Jr. won the Indy 500 from the pole position, his second career victory in that event.

Marlboro Team Penske dominated the 1994 CART season, winning 12 of 16 events including the Indianapolis 500. The three-car team of Al Unser Jr. (8 wins), Emerson Fittipaldi (1 win), and Paul Tracy (3 wins) swept the top three spots in the final season points standings, and had five 1-2-3 finishes over the course of the season. The Penske Team also made headlines during the month of May, when they unveiled the new Ilmor Mercedes-Benz 500I engine. The secretly-built, 209 in^{3} (3.42 L) displacement purpose-built pushrod engine, which was capable of nearly 1,000 horsepower (750 kW) was constructed specifically for the Indy 500.

== Overview ==
The season opener was won by Michael Andretti on his return to IndyCar racing after his unsuccessful season in Formula One. The rest of the 1994 season was dominated by Team Penske's PC-23 chassis, which won 12 of the 16 races. Penske driver Al Unser Jr. took the title. The Rookie of the Year title was taken by young Canadian Jacques Villeneuve. Veteran Mario Andretti retired at the end of the season.

Another major story started before the season. Indianapolis Motor Speedway President Tony George announced plans for the formation of what would become the Indy Racing League, with an intended focus on oval track racing and predominantly American drivers. This was nearly identical to NASCAR, which at the time had all American drivers and just two (of 31) races on road courses. The 1994 IndyCar season schedule featured six oval track races (37.5%) and eleven full-time drivers were from the United States (including Italian-born Mario Andretti and German-born Dominic Dobson). ABC Sports' Paul Page said during the broadcast of the race at Surfers Paradise that this announcement, "could drastically affect what we know as IndyCar racing in the future".

=== Teams and drivers ===
Newman/Haas' Nigel Mansell was expected to contend once again. He was viewed as the greatest racer in the world at the time, as his back-to-back championships in two such diverse major racing series (Formula One in 1992 and IndyCar in 1993) were unprecedented. This feat remains unmatched today. His teammate Mario Andretti announced before the season that it would be his last, though he would later attempt Le Mans a few times (speculation was that he wanted to win the race just to settle that he was in fact greater than 1967 winner A. J. Foyt, who have both been argued as the greatest ever). Newman-Haas would continue to be the leading Lola team, using the new T9400.

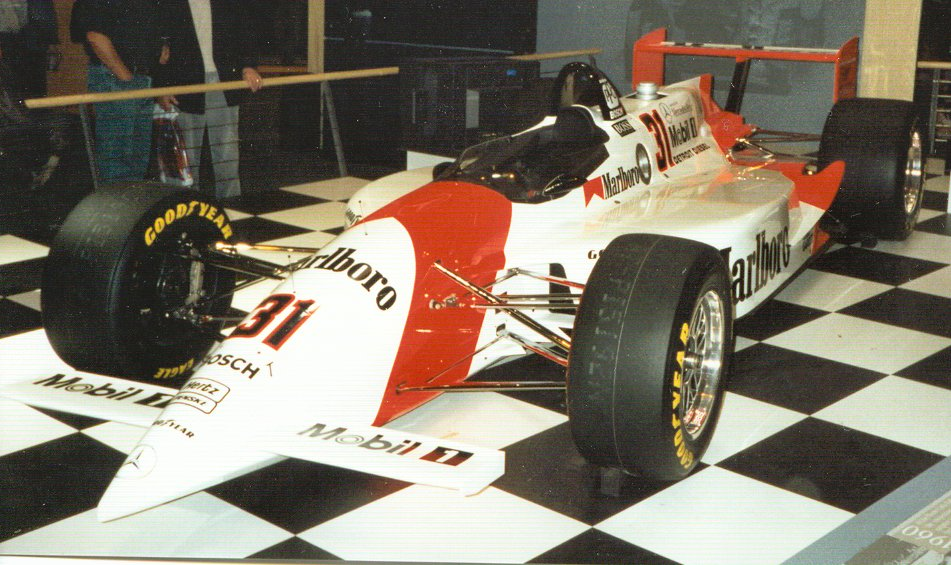
Team Penske's PC-23 chassis

Marlboro Team Penske expanded to a three-car operation with defending Indianapolis 500 winner Emerson Fittipaldi, rising star Paul Tracy, and 1990 IndyCar Champion and 1992 Indy 500 winner Al Unser Jr., defecting from Galles Racing after a disappointing 1993 campaign left him with just one win (Vancouver) and 7th in the standings. Penske changed to the new Ilmor engine in association with Mercedes-Benz rather than Chevrolet, who withdrew after 1993. Customer team Bettenhausen Motorsports with driver Stefan Johansson received the year-old PC-22 chassis as Penske began to utilise the new PC-23.

Rahal-Hogan Racing tackled a project: the new Honda engine. Team leader Bobby Rahal and teammate Mike Groff would face a challenge enduring the "growing pains" of the new engine. Fledgling Comptech Racing with rookie Parker Johnstone would be the only other entrant in 1994 to use the Honda engine, so Rahal and Groff would be providing the primary feedback.

Dick Simon Racing had a successful 1993 campaign with veteran Raul Boesel, who was 5th overall after a pole position at Milwaukee and 3 runner-up finishes. His new teammate would be Japanese Hiro Matsushita, replacing Scott Brayton who joined Team Menard. Simon would field a total af five cars for Indianapolis; Boesel, Matsushita, Tero Palmroth, Lyn St. James, and Hideshi Matsuda.

Galles Racing were presented with new challenges for 1994. Both of their name drivers Al Unser Jr. and Danny Sullivan departed (to Team Penske and NASCAR respectively), leaving owner Rick Galles with young Adrián Fernández. He proved his worth in Indy Lights by winning four races (in his one and only season), and looked to be Mexico's next big star (the first since Héctor Rebaque and Josele Garza). Fernandez would contest his first full season after five trial runs in 1993 (including 7th at Detroit). Team and driver would also use the brand new Reynard 94I; the company entering IndyCar racing as a first-time constructor.

Chip Ganassi Racing hired Michael Andretti following Formula one season.Ganassi would also use the Reynard chassis. Michael's teammate in 1993 was the great three-time World Champion Ayrton Senna; Senna's friend and countryman Maurício Gugelmin (another F1 veteran), in his first full season, would be Andretti's new teammate.

Indy Regency Racing hired Arie Luyendyk following his release from Ganassi Racing, thus ensuring that the 1990 Indianapolis 500 winner would not be on the sidelines. The team entered a second car at Laguna Seca for Indy Lights runner-up Franck Fréon of France.

The Forsythe/Green Racing team were new to IndyCar Racing. In 1993 they competed in CART's Formula Atlantic Championship with French-Canadian drivers Claude Bourbonnais and Jacques Villeneuve. Bourbonnais won seven times and was 2nd overall to fellow Canadian David Empringham by a mere four points, while Villeneuve won five times en route to 3rd in points (10 behind Empringham). The Green team preferred to take Villeneuve with them to IndyCar; perhaps because of his age (22 as opposed to 28) and/or because of his famous name.

The second four-time Indianapolis 500 champion Al Unser joined A. J. Foyt and Rick Mears (the other two four-time winners) in retirement after failing to qualify for the 78th running of the race. He later admitted that at this stage in his career that he was more interested in watching his son's career than focusing on his own racing.

== Drivers and teams ==
The following teams and drivers competed in the 1994 Indy Car World Series season. All teams used Goodyear tires; Firestone would return one year later after a hiatus lasting for two decades.

Team	Chassis	Engine(s)	No.	Drivers	Rounds	Primary Sponsor
Newman/Haas Racing	Lola T94/00	Ford XB	1	(United Kingdom) Nigel Mansell	All	Texaco-Havoline
Newman/Haas Racing	Lola T94/00	Ford XB	6	(United States) Mario Andretti	All	Texaco-Havoline
Marlboro Team Penske	Penske PC-23	Ilmor D Mercedes-Benz 500I	2	(Brazil) Emerson Fittipaldi	All	Marlboro
Marlboro Team Penske	Penske PC-23	Ilmor D Mercedes-Benz 500I	3	(Canada) Paul Tracy	All	Marlboro
Marlboro Team Penske	Penske PC-23	Ilmor D Mercedes-Benz 500I	31	(United States) Al Unser Jr.	All	Marlboro
Rahal-Hogan Racing	Lola T94/00; Lola T93/00; Penske PC-22	Honda; Ilmor D Ilmor C+	4	(United States) Bobby Rahal	All	Miller Genuine Draft
Rahal-Hogan Racing	Lola T94/00; Lola T93/00; Penske PC-22	Honda; Ilmor D Ilmor C+	10	(United States) Mike Groff	All	Motorola
Dick Simon Racing	Lola T9400; Lola T93/00	Ford XB	5	(Brazil) Raul Boesel	All	Duracell
Dick Simon Racing	Lola T9400; Lola T93/00	Ford XB	22	(Japan) Hiro Matsushita	All	Panasonic
Dick Simon Racing	Lola T9400; Lola T93/00	Ford XB	79	(United States) Dennis Vitolo	4	Charter America
Dick Simon Racing	Lola T9400; Lola T93/00	Ford XB	90	(United States) Lyn St. James	4	J.C. Penney
Dick Simon Racing	Lola T9400; Lola T93/00	Ford XB	99	(Japan) Hideshi Matsuda	4	Dick Simon Racing
Galles Racing	Reynard 94I	Ilmor D	7	(Mexico) Adrián Fernández	All	Tecate
Target Chip Ganassi Racing	Reynard 94I	Ford XB	8	(United States) Michael Andretti	All	Scotch Tape
Target Chip Ganassi Racing	Reynard 94I	Ford XB	88	(Brazil) Maurício Gugelmin	All	Hollywood Cigarettes
Walker Racing	Lola T94/00; Lola T93/00	Ford XB	9	(United States) Robby Gordon	All	Valvoline
Walker Racing	Lola T94/00; Lola T93/00	Ford XB	15	(United States) Mark Smith	All	Craftsman Tools
Walker Racing	Lola T94/00; Lola T93/00	Ford XB	24	(United States) Willy T. Ribbs	All	Service Merchandise
Jim Hall/VDS Racing	Reynard 94I	Ilmor D	11	(Italy) Teo Fabi	All	Pennzoil
Forsythe/Green Racing	Reynard 94I	Ford XB	12	(Canada) Jacques Villeneuve	All	Player's
A. J. Foyt Enterprises	Lola T94/00; Lola T9/300; Lola T92/00	Ford XB	14	(United States) Davy Jones	1–3	Copenhagen
A. J. Foyt Enterprises	Lola T94/00; Lola T9/300; Lola T92/00	Ford XB	14	(United States) Bryan Herta	4–9	Copenhagen
A. J. Foyt Enterprises	Lola T94/00; Lola T9/300; Lola T92/00	Ford XB	14	(United States) Eddie Cheever	10–16	Copenhagen
A. J. Foyt Enterprises	Lola T94/00; Lola T9/300; Lola T92/00	Ford XB	33	(United States) John Andretti	4	Bryant
Bettenhausen Motorsports	Penske PC-22	Ilmor D Ilmor C	16	(Sweden) Stefan Johansson	All	Alumax
Bettenhausen Motorsports	Penske PC-22	Ilmor D Ilmor C	61	(United States) Gary Bettenhausen	4	Alumax
Bettenhausen Motorsports	Penske PC-22	Ilmor D Ilmor C	76	(Australia) Gary Brabham	1	Split Cycle
Bettenhausen Motorsports	Penske PC-22	Ilmor D Ilmor C	76	(United States) Robbie Groff	3, 7	Condor 1 Alumax 1
PacWest Racing	Lola T94/00	Ford XB	17	(United States) Dominic Dobson	All	PacWest 15; Bank of America 1
PacWest Racing	Lola T94/00	Ford XB	71	(United States) Scott Sharp	All	PacWest 15; Bank of America 1
Hayhoe Racing	Reynard 94I	Ford XB	18	(United States) Jimmy Vasser	All	Conseco
Payton/Coyne Racing	Lola T93/00; Lola T92/00	Ford XB; Ilmor A	19	(United States) Robbie Buhl	1, 3	Mi-Jack
Payton/Coyne Racing	Lola T93/00; Lola T92/00	Ford XB; Ilmor A	19	(United States) Brian Till	2, 4	Mi-Jack
Payton/Coyne Racing	Lola T93/00; Lola T92/00	Ford XB; Ilmor A	19	(United States) Johnny Unser	5, 12	Mi-Jack
Payton/Coyne Racing	Lola T93/00; Lola T92/00	Ford XB; Ilmor A	19	(Italy) Mauro Baldi	11	Mi-Jack
Payton/Coyne Racing	Lola T93/00; Lola T92/00	Ford XB; Ilmor A	19	(Italy) Alessandro Zampedri	6–10, 13–16	Mi-Jack
Payton/Coyne Racing	Lola T93/00; Lola T92/00	Ford XB; Ilmor A	39	(Italy) Andrea Montermini	1	AGFA
Payton/Coyne Racing	Lola T93/00; Lola T92/00	Ford XB; Ilmor A	39	(United States) Johnny Unser	2–3	AGFA
Payton/Coyne Racing	Lola T93/00; Lola T92/00	Ford XB; Ilmor A	39	(Canada) Ross Bentley	4–16	AGFA
Pagan Racing	Lola T92/00	Buick	21	(Colombia) Roberto Guerrero	4	Interstate Batteries
Leader Card Racing	Lola T93/00	Ilmor C	23	(United States) Buddy Lazier	1–7, 9–13, 15	Financial World
Leader Card Racing	Lola T93/00	Ilmor C	23	(Italy) Giovanni Lavaggi	8, 14, 16	Financial World
Arciero Racing	Lola T94/00	Ford XB	25	(Brazil) Marco Greco	All	Project Indy
Team Menard	Lola T93/00	Menard V-6	27	(United States) Eddie Cheever	4	Quaker State
Team Menard	Lola T93/00	Menard V-6	59	(United States) Scott Brayton	4	Glidden
Team Menard	Lola T93/00	Menard V-6	59	(Australia) Geoff Brabham	4	Glidden
Indy Regency Racing	Lola T94/00	Ilmor D	28	(Netherlands) Arie Luyendyk	All	Eurosport
Indy Regency Racing	Lola T94/00	Ilmor D	29	(France) Franck Fréon	16	Eurosport
McCormack Motorsports	Lola T94/00	Ilmor D	30	(Canada) Claude Bourbonnais	3, 9, 11, 13–14	Player's
McCormack Motorsports	Lola T94/00	Ilmor D	30	(France) Stéphan Grégoire	4	Cybergenics
McCormack Motorsports	Lola T94/00	Ilmor D	30	(Sweden) Fredrik Ekblom	6	McCormack Motorsports
King Racing	Lola T94/00; Lola T93/00	Ford XB	40	(Canada) Scott Goodyear	All	Budweiser
King Racing	Lola T94/00; Lola T93/00	Ford XB	40	(United States) Davy Jones	4	Budweiser
King Racing	Lola T94/00; Lola T93/00	Ford XB	60	(Italy) Andrea Montermini	8–9	Budweiser
Greenfield Racing	Lola T93/01	Greenfield GC 209T	42	(United States) Johnny Parsons	4	Greenfield Racing
Arizona Motorsport	Lola T94/00	Ford XB	44	(Finland) Tero Palmroth	4	Arizona Motorsport
ProFormance Motorsports	Lola T93/00	Ilmor C	45	(United States) John Paul Jr.	2, 4	Cybergenics
Comptech Racing	Lola T94/00; Lola T93/00	Honda	49	(United States) Parker Johnstone	7–9, 11, 13, 16	Acura
Euromotorsport	Lola T93/00; Lola T92/00	Ilmor C Ilmor A	50	(Italy) Alessandro Zampedri	1, 3	Agip
Euromotorsport	Lola T93/00; Lola T92/00	Ilmor C Ilmor A	50	(United States) David Kudrave	2	Agip
Euromotorsport	Lola T93/00; Lola T92/00	Ilmor C Ilmor A	50	(United States) Jeff Wood	5, 7–12, 15–16	Agip
Euromotorsport	Lola T93/00; Lola T92/00	Ilmor C Ilmor A	50	(Italy) Giovanni Lavaggi	6	Agip
Euromotorsport	Lola T93/00; Lola T92/00	Ilmor C Ilmor A	50	(France) Franck Fréon	13–14	Agip
Euromotorsport	Lola T93/00; Lola T92/00	Ilmor C Ilmor A	55	(United States) David Kudrave	1, 3	Agip
Euromotorsport	Lola T93/00; Lola T92/00	Ilmor C Ilmor A	55	(United States) Jeff Andretti	2	Agip
Project Indy	Lola T93/00	Ford XB	64	(France) Franck Fréon	3, 7	Marcelo Group; No-Touch
Project Indy	Lola T93/00	Ford XB	64	(Belgium) Didier Theys	4	Marcelo Group; No-Touch
Project Indy	Lola T93/00	Ford XB	64	(Germany) Christian Danner	6, 8, 14	Marcelo Group; No-Touch
Project Indy	Lola T93/00	Ford XB	64	(Italy) Domenico Schiattarella	9, 11, 13	Marcelo Group; No-Touch
Project Indy	Lola T93/00	Ford XB	64	(Italy) Andrea Montermini	16	Marcelo Group; No-Touch
Riley & Scott	Lola T92/00	Buick	74	(United Kingdom) Jim Crawford	4	Riley & Scott
Hemelgarn Racing	Reynard	Ford XB	91	(United States) Stan Fox	4	Delta Faucet
Hemelgarn Racing	Lola T91/00	Buick	94	(United States) Jeff Andretti	4	Hemelgarn Racing

== Schedule ==
Icon	Legend
O	Oval/Speedway
R	Road course
S	Street circuit

Rnd	Date	Race Name	Circuit	City/Location
1	March 20	(Australia) Australian FAI IndyCar Grand Prix	S Surfers Paradise Street Circuit	Surfers Paradise, Australia
2	April 10	(United States) Slick 50 200	O Phoenix International Raceway	Avondale, Arizona
3	April 17	(United States) Toyota Grand Prix of Long Beach	S Streets of Long Beach	Long Beach, California
4	May 29*	(United States) 78th Indianapolis 500	O Indianapolis Motor Speedway	Speedway, Indiana
5	June 5	(United States) Miller Genuine Draft 200	O Milwaukee Mile	West Allis, Wisconsin
6	June 12	(United States) ITT Automotive Detroit Grand Prix	S The Raceway on Belle Isle Park	Detroit, Michigan
7	June 26	(United States) Budweiser/G. I. Joe's 200	R Portland International Raceway	Portland, Oregon
8	July 10	(United States) Budweiser Grand Prix of Cleveland	R Cleveland Burke Lakefront Airport	Cleveland, Ohio
9	July 17	(Canada) Molson Indy Toronto	S Exhibition Place	Toronto, Ontario
10	July 31	(United States) Marlboro 500	O Michigan International Speedway	Brooklyn, Michigan
11	August 14	(United States) Miller Genuine Draft 200	R Mid-Ohio Sports Car Course	Lexington, Ohio
12	August 21	(United States) Slick 50 200	O New Hampshire International Speedway	Loudon, New Hampshire
13	September 4	(Canada) Molson Indy Vancouver	S Streets of Vancouver	Vancouver, British Columbia
14	September 11	(United States) Texaco/Havoline 200	R Road America	Elkhart Lake, Wisconsin
15	September 18	(United States) Bosch Spark Plug Grand Prix	O Nazareth Speedway	Nazareth, Pennsylvania
16	October 9	(United States) Toyota Grand Prix of Monterey	R Laguna Seca Raceway	Monterey, California

* Indianapolis was USAC-sanctioned but counted towards the CART title.

== Results ==
Round	Race	Pole position	Fastest lap	Race Winner				Race Time	Report
Round	Race	Pole position	Fastest lap	Driver	Team	Chassis	Engine	Race Time	Report
1	(Australia) Surfers Paradise	(United Kingdom) Nigel Mansell	(United Kingdom) Nigel Mansell	(United States) Michael Andretti	Target Chip Ganassi Racing	Reynard 94I	Ford-Cosworth XB	1:44:58	Report
2	(United States) Phoenix	(Canada) Paul Tracy	(Brazil) Emerson Fittipaldi	(Brazil) Emerson Fittipaldi	Marlboro Team Penske	Penske PC-23	Ilmor D	1:51:41	Report
3	(United States) Long Beach	(Canada) Paul Tracy	(United States) Al Unser Jr.	(United States) Al Unser Jr.	Marlboro Team Penske	Penske PC-23	Ilmor D	1:40:53	Report
4	(United States) Indianapolis	(United States) Al Unser Jr.	(Brazil) Emerson Fittipaldi	(United States) Al Unser Jr.	Marlboro Team Penske	Penske PC-23	Mercedes 500I	3:06:29	Report
5	(United States) Milwaukee	(Brazil) Raul Boesel	(United States) Al Unser Jr.	(United States) Al Unser Jr.	Marlboro Team Penske	Penske PC-23	Ilmor D	1:36:57	Report
6	(United States) Detroit	(United Kingdom) Nigel Mansell	(United States) Al Unser Jr.	(Canada) Paul Tracy	Marlboro Team Penske	Penske PC-23	Ilmor D	1:52:29	Report
7	(United States) Portland	(United States) Al Unser Jr.	(United States) Al Unser Jr.	(United States) Al Unser Jr.	Marlboro Team Penske	Penske PC-23	Ilmor D	1:50:43	Report
8	(United States) Cleveland	(United States) Al Unser Jr.	(United States) Al Unser Jr.	(United States) Al Unser Jr.	Marlboro Team Penske	Penske PC-23	Ilmor D	1:27:32	Report
9	(Canada) Toronto	(United States) Robby Gordon	(United States) Michael Andretti	(United States) Michael Andretti	Target Chip Ganassi Racing	Reynard 94I	Ford-Cosworth XB	1:48:15	Report
10	(United States) Michigan	(United Kingdom) Nigel Mansell	(United States) Al Unser Jr.	(Canada) Scott Goodyear	Budweiser King Racing	Lola T9400	Ford-Cosworth XB	3:07:44	Report
11	(United States) Mid-Ohio	(United States) Al Unser Jr.	(United States) Al Unser Jr.	(United States) Al Unser Jr.	Marlboro Team Penske	Penske PC-23	Ilmor D	1:40:59	Report
12	(United States) New Hampshire	(Brazil) Emerson Fittipaldi	(Brazil) Emerson Fittipaldi	(United States) Al Unser Jr.	Marlboro Team Penske	Penske PC-23	Ilmor D	1:43:31	Report
13	(Canada) Vancouver	(United States) Robby Gordon	(United States) Robby Gordon	(United States) Al Unser Jr.	Marlboro Team Penske	Penske PC-23	Ilmor D	1:53:27	Report
14	(United States) Road America	(Canada) Paul Tracy	(United Kingdom) Nigel Mansell	(Canada) Jacques Villeneuve	Forsythe/Green Racing	Reynard 94I	Ford-Cosworth XB	1:42:37	Report
15	(United States) Nazareth	(Brazil) Emerson Fittipaldi	(Brazil) Emerson Fittipaldi	(Canada) Paul Tracy	Marlboro Team Penske	Penske PC-23	Ilmor D	1:31:30	Report
16	(United States) Laguna Seca	(Canada) Paul Tracy	(Canada) Paul Tracy	(Canada) Paul Tracy	Marlboro Team Penske	Penske PC-23	Ilmor D	2:00:00	Report

=== Race summaries ===
==== Race 1: Surfers Paradise ====
See 1994 Australian FAI Indycar Grand Prix

==== Race 2: Phoenix ====
This race was memorable for a scary incident at Lap 63. Hiro Matsushita, who had spent much time in the pits and was 18 laps down, and twice-lapped Teo Fabi touched in Turn 3 and hit the outside wall. Leader Paul Tracy, running just behind, was caught in the outer groove and was an innocent victim, piling into the two cars. Over ten seconds later, as the yellow flag came out and the field slowed down. Approaching the accident scene, Jacques Villeneuve moved into the upper lane to avoid a slowing Arie Luyendyk and Mario Andretti who were running side-by-side. This put the car into the marbles on the outside of the turn, leaving Villeneuve with no grip and heading straight for the crashed cars. With nowhere to go and no time to stop, Villeneuve T-boned Matsushita, thankfully just behind the cockpit area. This sent the front of Mastushita's car spinning to the bottom of the track, and throwing the engine and gearbox assembly into the side of Paul Tracy's car, partially striking his helmet. Dominic Dobson then collided with Villeneuve's car after the impact as it veered across the track towards the pit lane. No drivers sustained injuries, but Matsushita complained about a sore shoulder.

Another scary near-miss occurred during the final round of pitstops. Nigel Mansell, who had been fighting his way back through the field after stalling the car on his first pit stop, lit up his rear tires pulling away from his pit box, determined not to stall again. Unfortunately, the act of doing this caused him to pull out onto the warm-up apron too quickly on cold front tires, which gave little grip. Mansell understeered off the warm up apron, bouncing over the grass verge and back onto the track on the racing line, directly in the path of Buddy Lazier (mis-identified as Scott Goodyear on the ESPN broadcast). Lazier managed to slow just in time and avoided Mansell on the inside, waving his fist to make his displeasure known to the Englishman.

One other dangerous incident involved Mario and Michael Andretti. Late in the race, Mario suffered a mechanical failure on the backstretch and crashed into the outside wall, the car stopping at the apron at the bottom of the track. As the field came by, John Paul Jr. and Scott Goodyear slowed to avoid the accident just in front of Michael, creating a rapidly closing gap between the two cars. Michael, with nowhere to go, attempted to stop, but clipped John Paul Jr.'s right-rear tire. This broke off his left front wheel, which bounced over the nose cone into Scott Goodyear's car on Michael's right. The tire was then launched off of Goodyear's left-front wheel and into the air, sailing over the debris fence and landing in a spectator area. Amazingly, after two potentially fatal incidents, no serious injuries were reported. Emerson Fittipaldi scored the win ahead of Al Unser Jr. Third place Nigel Mansell was one lap down with Johansson and Vasser (both three laps back) completing the Top 5. Fittipaldi took the early championship lead with 37 PPG Cup points ahead of Johansson and Vasser with 22 each, Australia winner Andretti with 21, and Mansell at 19.

==== Race 3: Long Beach ====
Polesitter Paul Tracy was still looking for his first finish of the season. He scored his second pole of the year (and thus his second championship point) and planned to convert his speed into a victory. On Lap 21 while lapping Mike Groff, Tracy spun using too much rear brake, and ended Groff's day. Later on, Jacques Villeneuve passed Toronto's Scott Goodyear on the outside of Turn 1. ABC's Bobby Unser chuckled in disbelief as he commented, "That was an impossible pass!" Villeneuve later braked too late in Turn 7 (the end of the backstraight) and slammed the tire barrier. Three seconds later, he re-fired the car and continued on without significant damage. He would finish five laps down in 15th. Tracy would spin again in Turn 1, this time while passing Maurício Gugelmin. Gugelmin was more fortunate than Groff and continued without contact. Both Tracy and Fittipaldi would retire with separate transmission failures. Up front, Al Unser Jr. reclaimed his throne as the "King of the Beach" by winning his 5th Long Beach event by 39 seconds over Nigel Mansell and 46 seconds up on Robby Gordon. The Californian became the 10th different leader in IndyCar's Long Beach history, such was the domination of Unser Jr. and the Andrettis in the first decade of the race. Raul Boesel and Mario Andretti capped the Top 5, as the championship battle was on. Fittipaldi and Unser were tied at 37 points each (both with a win and a second place), Mansell in third at 35 points, Michael Andretti with 29 points, Stefan Johansson (finishing 10th after running out of fuel) at 25 points, and Mario in sixth at 24 points as the teams prepared for the month of May.

==== Race 4: 78th Indianapolis 500 mile race ====
See 1994 Indianapolis 500

==== Race 5: Milwaukee ====
Raul Boesel started from the pole for the second year in a row. The race was run without incidents, but the racing was close and exciting. Marlboro Team Penske dominated the race with Emerson Fittipaldi and Indy 500 champion Al Unser Jr. Amazingly, 25 of 26 starters finished the race (only Stefan Johansson did not finish due to engine failure, 29 laps down to the winner), giving the leaders major headaches concerning traffic. The race was called eight laps from the end (192 of 200 laps) due to ensuing rain, with Unser in front winning his third consecutive race. Fittipaldi was second and Paul Tracy, two laps back, completed a Penske 1-2-3 sweep. Michael Andretti and Nigel Mansell rounded out the top five. Unser's lead increased to 25 points over Fittipaldi, 30 over Andretti, 34 ahead of Mansell, and 41 up on Robby Gordon.

==== Race 6: Detroit ====
Al Unser Jr. looked to win four IndyCar races in a row coming to Detroit, a circuit at which he had never won. Unser himself was the most recent winner of four consecutive races, doing so in 1990 at Toronto, Michigan, Denver, and Vancouver. He also won the championship that year, and he was in prime position to win the title again. Nigel Mansell was on pole, and led the first lap. In Turn 3 Mike Groff slid off the course into the tyre barrier. He continued, but retired after seven laps, as did Raul Boesel due to engine failure. Late in Lap 2, Al Jr. took the lead from Mansell entering Turn 13. On Lap 21 Dominic Dobson spun in Turn 1, collecting Alessandro Zampedri who was directly behind him. Mario Andretti spun off at Turn 8 on Lap 47, and hit the tyres but was able to continue. Not so lucky was Adrian Fernandez, who brought out the yellow on Lap 50. Following the restart, Unser led teammate Paul Tracy while combating traffic. In Turn 8 Unser slowed sooner than Tracy expected (he likely couldn't see Jimmy Vasser immediately in front of Unser) and touched the championship leader's right rear tire, sending him into a tire barrier. Unser kept the car running after hitting the tires, but his chance of his fourth straight win was over. Soon after in Turn 3, Nigel Mansell spun off behind Emerson Fittipaldi, who like Unser was contemplating his moves in traffic. Tracy won the race, and said that he would immediately apologize to Unser as soon as he found him. Fittipaldi was second, with Gordon, Teo Fabi, and Michael Andretti coming across the line in the top five. Emmo knocked Little Al's point lead down to 13 points. Michael Andretti was 24 behind, Robby Gordon 31 back, and Nigel Mansell 37 down, as his hopes of title defense were looking slim.

==== Race 7: Portland ====
Al Unser Jr. took pole position again, seeking to recover the ground he lost to Emerson Fittipaldi two weeks before. An incredible 32 cars took the green flag, showing the strength of the sport at the time. Lap 11 saw a dynamic exit for Michael Andretti, who collided with Jimmy Vasser in an attempt to pass him in Turn 1. Both were done; disappointing for both because Michael was 3rd in points and Vasser tied for 6th with Paul Tracy. The race saw little in the way of carnage, but after many successful passes were made by various drivers in Turn 1, the Lap 11 crash was reenacted by Bryan Herta and Scott Goodyear, who tried to overtake and paid the price on Lap 58. The battle for the win was again between Penske's Unser and Fittipaldi. On the final pit stop exchange, Emerson exited the pitlane and beat Al Junior into Turn 1. But on the exit of the corner, Junior accelerated sooner, properly anticipating Emmo's moves, and grabbed the lead. Unser's win was the sixth in a row for "The Captain", with Fittipaldi in second, Tracy third (another 1-2-3 sweep), and for fourth Robby Gordon edged Nigel Mansell. Both drivers crossed the line simultaneously (to the one-thousandth of a second), but the position was awarded to Gordon. Jacques Villeneuve was 6th, one lap back, followed by Alessandro Zampedri. His 7th-place finish would be his career best in a CART-sanctioned race. Al Unser Jr.'s lead over Fittipaldi was now 105–86. Robby Gordon was third for Walker Racing with 64 points, while Michael and Mansell were 46 and 49 points behind. Paul Tracy's season was coming together, as he now had 50 championship points, but still a long way behind Unser.

==== Race 8: Cleveland ====
Al Unser Jr. claimed his third pole of the season. The first turn, which usually provides the most dramatic action at the Burke Lakefront Airport Circuit, saw Michael Andretti (who qualified a lowly 17th place) and Scott Goodyear spin. Bobby Rahal and the team had not yet eradicated the engine gremlins in the still-new Honda powerplant. Mario Andretti, whose final season started well, had more struggles with a failed suspension after 31 laps. Emerson Fittipaldi, in desperate need of points to kept up with Unser, retired with a small fire in the rear of his car. Michael Andretti's engine quit with just eight laps remaining, and Al Unser Jr. won his fifth race of the year; the seventh in a row for Penske. Runner-up Nigel Mansell had competed in the French Grand Prix for Williams during the off-weekend, with speculation that he may return to Formula One full-time for 1995. Tracy, Villeneuve, and Johansson completed the top five. Unser more than recovered what was lost at Detroit with a gruesome 41 point advantage over Fittipaldi, 55 over Mansell, 61 ahead of Gordon, and 63 points ahead of Tracy at the halfway point of the season.

This was Al Junior's 24th IndyCar win, and thus the 100th for the Unser family, adding to Al Senior's 39 wins, Uncle Bobby's 35, and 2 wins by Louis Unser (Al and Bobby's uncle). The Unsers are still the only family to win 100 or more IndyCar races combined, currently at 110.

==== Race 9: Toronto ====
Indy Lights champion Bryan Herta had a season-ending accident in qualifying. A. J. Foyt did not find a replacement driver for the race, but Eddie Cheever would race the #14 for the remainder of the season.

Robby Gordon won his first career pole ahead of Nigel Mansell. Emerson Fittipaldi and Michael Andretti would also be in the hunt, but championship leader Al Unser Jr.'s bid for three wins in a row ended on Lap 3 with a blown engine. While still in the lead, Robby suffered a burst left rear tyre in Turn One, handing the lead to Mansell on Lap 13. On Lap 26 Michael Andretti seized the moment and pounced on Nigel in Turn 8. Mansell immediately slowed, as his right rear was flat. He later parked the car with handling issues. On Lap 69 Adrian Fernandez tried an unsuccessful pass on the inside of Willy T. Ribbs, the two touching in Turn 3 and collecting Maurício Gugelmin who tried to sneak past on the outside. Mario Andretti easily passed by on the inside, where there was just enough room. Both Fittipaldi and Gordon (in third and fourth) had to stop because of their placements on the track in relation to the accident. Innocent bystander Mike Groff stalled the engine after having to stop. Michael Andretti took his record fourth Toronto win after problems with the air jack on the last pit stop. Bobby Rahal and Fittipaldi completed the podium, with Mario Andretti in fourth and home crowd favorite Paul Tracy one lap back in fifth. Fittipaldi whittled Unser's lead to 27, as the rest of the top six were as follows: Michael Andretti (-47 points), Robby Gordon (-52), Paul Tracy (-53), and Nigel Mansell (-55).

==== Race 10: Marlboro 500 at Michigan ====
Nigel Mansell set a new track record alongside Raul Boesel and Michael Andretti in a three-abreast start. At the start-finish line on Lap 24, third place runner Robby Gordon burst a right front tyre. Seemingly by instinct he gradually slowed the car under the yellow, never touching the wall, and was able to continue undamaged. Soon after polesitter Mansell suffered a stuck throttle, which he described to ESPN's Jon Beekhuis as, "the scariest moment I've had in my whole career." On lap 65, Adrian Fernandez leapt from his racecar as methanol spilled during a routine pit stop. A moment later Michael Andretti jammed the brakes to avoid Paul Tracy and caught the wall, ruining the suspension. On Lap 78 rookie Jacques Villeneuve suddenly pushed up the banking into the wall in Turn 3, walking away unharmed.

The lead pack included the Penske cars of Unser and Fittipaldi, Raul Boesel, Scott Goodyear, and Robby Gordon, who recovered from his flat tire. Just short of halfway, Mario Andretti's engine failure made him the 11th retiree of the day. Inside of 70 laps remaining, Gordon's engine blew in the middle of Turns 3 and 4. He maintained control of the car for several seconds on the banking, but the new oil on the track took away his traction and sent him into a 270-degree spin entering the pitlane. He never completed the spin, and never touched a wall, but his race was over. On Lap 225, while leading, Raul Boesel's excellent chance to finally win his first IndyCar race ended when his Ford XB engine expired at 90% distance, handing the lead to Al Unser Jr. He hoped to be the first man to win the Indianapolis 500 and the Michigan 500 in the same year since Rick Mears in 1991, but six laps later he joined his teammates in the garage area causing the final caution flag of the race (his oil on the track), leaving just eight of the twenty-eight starters on track: Scott Goodyear, Arie Luyendyk (1 lap down), Dominic Dobson (2 laps back), Teo Fabi (4 laps), Mark Smith (-10 laps), Hiro Matsushita (-11 laps), Willy T. Ribbs (-13 laps), and Marco Greco, who finished 55 laps down in eleventh. Goodyear, the 1992 winner of the race, was the proverbial "tortoise" beating the quicker "hares" while giving the Lola chassis its only win in 1994. Al Unser Jr., despite his DNF, led with 132 points, 29 more than Emerson Fittipaldi at 103, Michael Andretti had 80 points, Gordon 75, Tracy 74, and Mansell 73.

==== Race 11: Mid-Ohio ====
Al Unser Jr. rebounded from the disappointment from Michigan by winning his fourth pole position of the season. Saturday was plagued by excessive rain, so times from the first session of qualifications held on Friday were used to determine the race lineup. Paul Tracy took the lead from second place in Turn 4, which was the first turn as the green flag was given as usual on the backstretch. Early on, Mike Groff and Michigan winner Scott Goodyear touched and spun into the Turn 2 gravel battling for the twelfth position. Great racing was prevalent throughout the field, much of which orbited around Michael Andretti and Robby Gordon, both known for aggressive driving styles. On Lap 44 Tracy made a "banzai" move to put Adrian Fernandez one lap down, because Unser was not far behind. The two got very close, possibly touching, but Tracy gained a time advantage over Unser thanks to his bravery. Later Teo Fabi spun off in Turn 2, causing a local yellow. Robby Gordon, right in front of Tracy, slowed and nearly spun to obey the flags. Tracy passed Gordon with his momentum in the corner and was assigned a stop-and-go penalty, as was Mario Andretti for likewise overtaking in the yellow zone. Unser took the win ahead of Tracy and Emerson Fittipaldi, who started and finished 1-2-3. Gordon and Andretti finished one lap behind the Penskes, with Adrian Fernandez getting his new best career finish of sixth. The Penske drivers were 1-2-3 in qualifying, the race, and the championship: Unser led Fittipaldi 153–117, Tracy moved up to third at 91 points, Andretti at 90, Gordon 87, Mansell 79, and rookie leader Jacques Villeneuve was seventh with 54 points.

==== Race 12: New Hampshire ====
Emerson Fittipaldi took his first pole in nearly a year. At the start, eighth place starter Adrian Fernandez spun across the track without contact. But in an effort to avoid him, Jacques Villeneuve and Arie Luyendyk crashed and were done for the day before taking the green flag, thus failing to start the race. Robby Gordon spun harmlessly. Luyendyk blamed the crash on the top qualifiers for bringing the field perhaps too slowly to the green flag. The resulting 25 car starting field was the smallest of the year, showing the strength of the sport at the time. A scary crash on Lap 13 involved Mike Groff and former Trans-Am champion Scott Sharp. Groff spun exiting Turn 2 and hit the outside wall; just behind him, Sharp spun to avoid him and was propelled by his kinetic energy onto Groff's nose. His car was launched into the air and flipped once and a half, leaving the Connecticut native hanging upside down in the car for approximately two minutes. The rookie was flipped carefully onto his wheels and walked away unharmed.

Fittipaldi led the first 46 laps until Paul Tracy took it from him on the outside in Turn 3. Tracy was looking for redemption; he was now leading the race he nearly won the year before when he lost a duel with Nigel Mansell in the waning laps. Emerson soon lost second to Raul Boesel, and third to Nigel Mansell, and pitted several laps early to correct quite evident handling woes. Point leader Al Unser Jr., who started tenth, was climbing through the field. He was in the Top 5 by Lap 50. At Lap 69 Unser was side by side with his teammate at the stripe, and at Lap 70 he passed Tracy, who then lost second to Mansell. Unser pitted at Lap 82, followed by Mario Andretti and Tracy. Mansell stayed out 4 laps longer before his first stop. Once the stops were completed, Unser led Tracy and Mansell through a large collection of lapped traffic. Mansell's bid to win died slowly after he and teammate Mario Andretti touched in Turn 1 on Lap 109. Andretti was a lap down, but the two already had some bad blood between them. Mario hit the wall, bringing out the final yellow flag, while Mansell soldiered on for nearly 20 more laps before getting fed up with the poor handling.

By this time, the Penske cars were alone in the lead lap. Emerson Fittipaldi pitted before the restart, knowing he likely couldn't reach the checkered flag without another stop but he could have a much shorter stop within the final laps. That was the exact scenario that played out, as Emerson gained a lead as great as 22 seconds (nearly a full lap) after teammates Unser and Tracy pitted at Lap 152. By Lap 195 Emerson's lead had gradually shrunk by several seconds as he finally came into the pits. He was in his pit box for only 5.9 seconds, but Unser led another Penske 1-2-3 sweep ahead of Tracy and Fittipaldi. All three cars were separated by approximately nine tenths of a second from each other at the chequers, thanks to heavy traffic. Raul Boesel and Michael Andretti were two laps back in fourth and fifth. Dominic Dobson surprisingly qualified and finished sixth (three laps down) for PacWest Racing, who had recently tested at Mid-Ohio with Danny Sullivan. The 1988 PPG Cup Champion was rumored to drive a third PacWest car at Vancouver. The Penske juggernaut continued to lead the championship, with Unser leading at 173 points, Fittipaldi 133 points, Tracy 107, Michael Andretti 100, Gordon 87, and Mansell 79.

==== Race 13: Vancouver ====
Robby Gordon was on pole for the second time in his career; his first pole coming in July at Toronto. After completing 8 laps, rookie Alessandro Zampedri retired in spectacular fashion with a fire in the rear of his car. He headed for the runoff area in the Turn 5 chicane, pointing behind him to get the attention of the course marshalls. Paul Tracy and Teo Fabi had a coming together while battling in the top five. Tracy made a clean pass in the Turn 3 hairpin, and Fabi tried to get it back in Turn 5. Tracy was committed to his line into the corner, and contact ensued. This happened immediately after 7th placed Al Unser Jr. made his first pit stop, and while only Gordon and Nigel Mansell stayed out, Unser restarted 3rd. Gordon's chance to win was soon greatly damaged when he missed Turn 10 and had to use the pitlane to rejoin the circuit. Because he clipped a wall in the incident, he suffered a puncture (just like in Toronto) and made an unscheduled green flag pit stop, dropping to 17th and handing the lead to Nigel Mansell. While Mansell established an 11-second lead, Michael Andretti passed Unser for 2nd place, recovering his position he lost in the early laps when he had a right rear puncture. Mansell and Michael pitted under yellow after Willy T. Ribbs spun and stopped precariously in Turn 8, and Unser took the lead.

A lap after the restart, Paul Tracy spun in front of Emerson Fittipaldi in Turn 3 immediately after taking 5th from him. On Lap 95, Tracy was "sandwiched" between the Andrettis; Mario was ahead, a lap down, and Michael was behind. Tracy slowed conservatively for the Turn 10 complex (the final set of corners) and was hit by Michael. Unser won by 2.2 seconds over Robby Gordon, Michael Andretti, Scott Goodyear, and Maurício Gugelmin. A battle for fourth went wrong for two former World Champions, as Nigel Mansell tagged Emerson Fittipaldi in the final corner trying to outbrake him. Emerson fell to ninth in the results; resulting in a 56-point lead for Unser, who only needed a fourth-place finish at Road America to win the championship. Even if Fittipaldi, the only man who could stop Unser, won all three remaining races, Unser only needed 12 more points. Unser's eighth win of the year clinched the Nations' Cup for the United States and put him at 193 points, compared to Fittipaldi's 137, Michael at 114, Tracy 107, Gordon 104, and Mansell 83.

==== Race 14: Road America ====
The front row was all Canadian: Paul Tracy and rookie Jacques Villeneuve, equaling his best career start at Phoenix. Tracy was a carlength ahead of the rookie at the start, but Villeneuve used the slipstream to attempt and failed outside pass into Turn 1. Tracy ran away as Al Unser Jr. was mindful of what he needed to do to win the championship, running third behind Paul and Jacques. Unser and Villeneuve swapped positions after the first round of pit stops when the latter could not find a gear when trying to launch from his pit stall. Within 20 (of 50) laps to go, Arie Luyendyk crashed in "The Kink", which is Turn 11, nearly collecting German Christian Danner driving for Project Indy. The former F3000 champion took to the grass on the outside of the turn at over 160 miles per hour, nearly losing control, but showing nice car control and was not collected.

On the restart Tracy was caught up by Unser, who moved to the left to pass in the outside of Turn 1, and Vileneuve who chose the opposite side. Tracy moved to the right to outbrake Unser and keep the lead, touching with Villeneuve whom he wasn't anticipating. The order was now Villeneuve, Tracy, Unser, Emerson Fittipaldi, Teo Fabi, and Mario Andretti. Tracy soon began to slow, with an engine turning sour. Unser slowly gained on Villeneuve but didn't gain enough. Villeneuve became the fourth Canadian to win an IndyCar race; the first being his uncle Jacques nine years before in this race. Unser clinched the championship ahead of Fittipaldi, Fabi, and Adrian Fernandez. The championship battle was now for second; Fittipaldi was there with 151, ahead of Michael Andretti, who suffered two right rear punctures and a broken exhaust system in 45 laps after starting 20th, at 114, Tracy 109, and Gordon 104.

==== Race 15: Nazareth ====
The fewest entrants arrived at Nazareth: twenty nine; the fourth race of the season with this count (Milwaukee, Michigan, and New Hampshire). Emerson Fittipaldi won the pole alongside Paul Tracy. New champion Al Unser Jr. started 18th. Third place starter Nigel Mansell made an early unscheduled pit stop, ending any chance to win. By Lap 33 Unser moved up to third. Ten laps later the course was under yellow for a backstretch accident in which Eddie Cheever clipped hometown favorite Mario Andretti. His teammate Mansell retired with a loose racecar. On Lap 140 Jacques Villeneuve touched with Adrian Fernandez, who hit the outside wall (breaking off the right front), bounced off the inside wall, and struck the outside wall again before the car finally stopped. Fernandez walked away. Marlboro Team Penske defined domination as Paul Tracy, Al Unser Jr., and Emerson Fittipaldi finished four laps ahead of fourth place Raul Boesel, and Stefan Johansson another lap back in fifth. Unser and Fittipaldi had clinched first and second in the championship, so the battle for third was between Tracy at 130 and Andretti with 118. Jacques Villeneuve had already clinched the rookie award and appeared to be set for stardom.

==== Race 16: Laguna Seca ====
This race was the record 407th and final IndyCar race for the great Mario Andretti. He qualified twelfth, but for the pace laps was given honorary pole position. Former CART flagman Nick Fornoro came back to wave the green flag for Mario's last race.

Paul Tracy won back-to-back poles and showed the form he struggled to find in the early part of the year. He set a new track record of 1:10.058 seconds. Exiting Turn 2 (the hairpin) Al Unser Jr. touched wheels with Robby Gordon and slid off the course. Michael Andretti outbraked Arie Luyendyk for eighth in Turn 3, but spun the rear wheels and spun out. Champions collided as four seconds later he was struck by an unfortunate Bobby Rahal, ending the day for both, and assuring Paul Tracy of third in the standings. Turn 3 and "The Corkscrew" (the Turn 8 downhill chicane complex which literally screws into itself) were the preferred places to pass behind Tracy. Robby Gordon spun twice, giving up a likely points finish. On Lap 82 Mario's career ended a few laps too early as he slowed with engine failure and ended 19th. Tracy took maximum points (22) ahead of Raul Boesel, who finished second for the fifth time in his IndyCar career. Jacques Villeneuve, Emerson Fittipaldi, Teo Fabi, Arie Luyendyk, and Adrian Fernandez were also in the lead lap. The final points went to Nigel Mansell, Andrea Montermini, Dominic Dobson, Willy T. Ribbs, and Stefan Johansson; all one lap down.

This race was also the last Indy Car event for Nigel Mansell. After the season, he ran the final three races in Formula One that season for Williams as the only active World Champion, as Alain Prost retired after the 1993 season and Ayrton Senna was killed while leading at Imola in May. After having raced at Magny-Cours in June, Mansell spun off in Jerez, finished fourth in Suzuka, and after title contenders Michael Schumacher and Damon Hill collided, won the finale in Adelaide, Australia. In 1995 he defected to McLaren, soon leaving the team due to an uncompetitive car.

Also exiting the sport were the King Racing team owned by drag racing legend Kenny Bernstein. A year later he would also pull the plug on his NASCAR Winston Cup operation; both were due to lack of competitiveness.

=== Final driver standings ===
Pos	Driver	SUR (Australia)	PHX (United States)	LBH (United States)	INDY (United States)	MIL (United States)	BEL (United States)	POR (United States)	CLE (United States)	TOR (Canada)	MIS (United States)	MOH (United States)	NHS (United States)	VAN (Canada)	ROA (United States)	NAZ (United States)	LAG (United States)	Pts
1	(United States) Al Unser Jr.	14	2	1*	**1**	1*	10*	**1***	**1***	29	8	**1**	1	1	2	2	20	225
2	(Brazil) Emerson Fittipaldi	2	1*	21	17*	2	2	2	20	3	10	3	**3***	9	3	**3**	4	178
3	(Canada) Paul Tracy	16	**23**	**20**	23	3	1	3	3	5	16	2*	2	20	**18***	1*	**1***	152
4	(United States) Michael Andretti	1*	20	6	6	4	5	31	18	1*	22	5	5	3	17	9	28	118
5	(United States) Robby Gordon	23	7	3	5	6	3	4	11	**6**	13	4	13	**2**	25	23	13	104
6	(Canada) Jacques Villeneuve RY	17	25	15	2	9	7	6	4	9	20	9	26	24	1	7	3	94
7	(Brazil) Raul Boesel	27	8	4	21	**8**	28	23	6	12	9*	8	4	23	6	4	2	90
8	(United Kingdom) Nigel Mansell	**9**	3	2	22	5	**21**	5	2	23	**26**	7	18	10*	13	22	8	88
9	(Italy) Teo Fabi	7	26	9	7	17	4	27	9	8	4	21	20	18	4	6	5	79
10	(United States) Bobby Rahal	26	14	30	3	7	6	12	28	2	28	27	9	7	9	14	29	59
11	(Sweden) Stefan Johansson	5	4	10	15	26	22	8	5	14	14	12	23	26	8	5	12	57
12	(Canada) Scott Goodyear	10	11	19	30	22	11	28	14	10	1	22	11	4	7	8	27	55
13	(Mexico) Adrián Fernández	13	10	8	28	16	23	10	7	13	23	6	8	22	5	21	7	46
14	(United States) Mario Andretti	3	21	5	32	14	18	9	27	4	18	10	19	11	16	25	19	45
15	(United States) Jimmy Vasser	4	5	24	4	11	20	32	31	25	25	14	7	15	28	13	26	42
16	(Brazil) Maurício Gugelmin	6	15	7	11	15	8	30	8	20	15	25	14	5	19	10	22	39
17	(Netherlands) Arie Luyendyk	25	22	11	18	21	19	14	21	31	2	13	27	6	22	26	6	34
18	(United States) Dominic Dobson	12	24	17	29	13	25	17	25	11	3	15	6	19	11	19	10	30
19	(United States) Mark Smith	21	Wth	25	DNQ	24	14	16	22	30	5	20	12	8	26	12	14	17
20	(United States) Mike Groff	8	6	27	31	19	27	11	19	22	27	26	25	14	20	11	15	17
21	(United States) Scott Sharp R	11	9	28	16	12	13	18	24	16	12	11	24	12	10	15	21	14
22	(United States) Willy T. Ribbs	18	28	18	DNQ	25	16	25	12	21	7	28	10	25	24	18	11	12
23	(United States) Bryan Herta R				9	10	9	28	13	Wth								11
24	(Italy) Andrea Montermini	Wth							16	7							9	10
25	(Italy) Alessandro Zampedri R	22		22			26	7	10	17	Wth			28	23	20	16	9
26	(Japan) Hiro Matsushita	15	27	DNQ	14	23	DNQ	21	15	18	6	18	17	DNQ	14	16	23	8
27	(United States) Eddie Cheever				8						21	17	21	17	27	24	25	5
28	(United States) John Andretti				10													3
29	(Brazil) Marco Greco	DNQ	16	23	27	20	24	20	26	15	11	DNQ	16	16	21	17	24	2
30	(Germany) Christian Danner						12								12			2
31	(United States) Davy Jones	19	12	14	Wth													1
32	(France) Franck Fréon R			12				15						DNQ	29		18	1
33	(United States) Brian Till		19		12													1
34	(United States) Robbie Groff R			13				13										0
35	(United States) Parker Johnstone R							19	17	27		23		13			17	0
36	(United States) Buddy Lazier	DNQ	13	29	DNQ	18	17	24	Wth	DNS	24	DNQ	DNS	27		DNQ		0
37	(United States) Stan Fox				13													0
38	(Italy) Giovanni Lavaggi R						DNQ		30						15		DNQ	0
39	(Sweden) Fredrik Ekblom R						15											0
40	(United States) Johnny Unser		DNQ	DNQ		Wth							15					0
41	(United States) Robbie Buhl	20		16														0
42	(Italy) Domenico Schiattarella R									26		16		Wth				0
43	(United States) Jeff Wood							29	23	28	17	DNQ	DNQ			DNQ	DNQ	0
44	(United States) Jeff Andretti		17		Wth													0
45	(United States) John Paul Jr.		18		25													0
46	(Canada) Ross Bentley				Wth	Wth	DNQ	22	29	19	19	DNQ	22	DNQ	Wth	DNQ	DNQ	0
47	(Italy) Mauro Baldi R											19						0
48	(United States) Lyn St. James				19													0
49	(United States) Scott Brayton				20													0
50	(Canada) Claude Bourbonnais R			26						24		24		21	30			0
51	(Australia) Gary Brabham	24																0
52	(Japan) Hideshi Matsuda R				24													0
53	(United States) Dennis Vitolo				26													0
54	(Colombia) Roberto Guerrero				33													0
	(United States) David Kudrave	Wth	DNQ	DNQ														0
	(United States) Gary Bettenhausen				DNQ													0
	(Australia) Geoff Brabham				DNQ													0
	(France) Stéphan Grégoire				DNQ													0
	(Finland) Tero Palmroth				DNQ													0
	(United States) Johnny Parsons				DNQ													0
	(Belgium) Didier Theys				DNQ													0
	(United Kingdom) Jim Crawford				DNQ													0
	(United States) Al Unser				Wth													0
	(United States) Pancho Carter				Wth													0
	(Brazil) Roberto Moreno				Wth													0
Pos	Driver	SUR (Australia)	PHX (United States)	LBH (United States)	INDY (United States)	MIL (United States)	BEL (United States)	POR (United States)	CLE (United States)	TOR (Canada)	MIS (United States)	MOH (United States)	NHS (United States)	VAN (Canada)	ROA (United States)	NAZ (United States)	LAG (United States)	Pts

Color	Result
Gold	Winner
Silver	2nd place
Bronze	3rd place
Green	4th-6th place
Light Blue	7th-12th place
Dark Blue	Finished (Outside Top 12)
Purple	Did not finish
Red	Did not qualify (DNQ)
Brown	Withdrawn (Wth)
Black	Disqualified (DSQ)
White	Did not start (DNS)
Blank	Did not participate (DNP)
Blank	Not competing

**In-line notation**
**Bold**	Pole position
Italics	Ran fastest race lap
*	Led most race laps
RY	Rookie of the Year
R	Rookie

=== Nations' Cup ===
- Top result per race counts towards Nations' Cup.

Pos	Country	SUR (Australia)	PHX (United States)	LBH (United States)	INDY (United States)	MIL (United States)	BEL (United States)	POR (United States)	CLE (United States)	TOR (Canada)	MIS (United States)	MOH (United States)	NHS (United States)	VAN (Canada)	ROA (United States)	NAZ (United States)	LAG (United States)	Pts
1	United States	1	2	1	1	1	3	1	1	1	3	1	1	1	2	2	10	292
2	Canada	10	11	15	2	3	1	3	3	5	1	2	2	4	1	1	1	225
3	Brazil	2	1	4	11	2	2	2	6	3	9	3	3	5	3	3	2	213
4	England	9	3	2	22	5	21	5	2	23	26	7	18	10	13	22	8	88
5	Italy	7	26	9	7	17	4	7	9	7	4	16	20	18	4	6	5	86
6	Sweden	5	4	10	15	26	15	8	5	14	14	12	23	26	8	5	12	57
7	Mexico	13	10	8	28	16	23	10	7	13	23	6	8	22	5	21	7	46
8	Netherlands	25	22	11	18	21	19	14	21	31	2	13	27	6	22	26	6	34
9	Japan	15	27	DNQ	14	23	DNQ	21	15	18	6	18	17	DNQ	14	16	23	8
10	Germany						12		Wth						12			2
11	France			12	DNQ			15						DNQ	29		18	1
12	Australia	24			DNQ													0
13	Colombia				33													0
	Belgium				DNQ													0
	Finland				DNQ													0
	Scotland				DNQ													0
Pos	Driver	SUR (Australia)	PHX (United States)	LBH (United States)	INDY (United States)	MIL (United States)	BEL (United States)	POR (United States)	CLE (United States)	TOR (Canada)	MIS (United States)	MOH (United States)	NHS (United States)	VAN (Canada)	ROA (United States)	NAZ (United States)	LAG (United States)	Pts

=== Chassis Constructors' Cup ===
Pos	Chassis	Top Team	Top Driver	SUR (Australia)	PHX (United States)	LBH (United States)	INDY (United States)	MIL (United States)	BEL (United States)	POR (United States)	CLE (United States)	TOR (Canada)	MIS (United States)	MOH (United States)	NHS (United States)	VAN (Canada)	ROA (United States)	NAZ (United States)	LAG (United States)	Pts
1	(United States) Penske PC-23/PC-22	Marlboro Team Penske	Al Unser Jr.	2	1	1	**1**	1	1	**1**	**1**	3	8	**1**	1	1	2	1	**1**	313
2	(United Kingdom) Lola T9400/T9300/T9200	Walker Racing	Robby Gordon	3	3	2	5	5	3	4	2	2	1	4	4	2	6	4	2	226
3	(United Kingdom) Reynard 94I	Target Chip Ganassi Racing	Michael Andretti	1	5	6	2	4	4	6	4	1	4	5	5	3	1	6	3	208
Pos	Chassis	Top Team	Top Driver	SUR (Australia)	PHX (United States)	LBH (United States)	INDY (United States)	MIL (United States)	BEL (United States)	POR (United States)	CLE (United States)	TOR (Canada)	MIS (United States)	MOH (United States)	NHS (United States)	VAN (Canada)	ROA (United States)	NAZ (United States)	LAG (United States)	Pts

=== Engine Manufacturers' Cup ===
Pos	Engine	Top Team	Top Driver	SUR (Australia)	PHX (United States)	LBH (United States)	INDY (United States)	MIL (United States)	BEL (United States)	POR (United States)	CLE (United States)	TOR (Canada)	MIS (United States)	MOH (United States)	NHS (United States)	VAN (Canada)	ROA (United States)	NAZ (United States)	LAG (United States)	Pts
1	(United Kingdom) Ilmor D, C, A	Marlboro Team Penske	Al Unser Jr.	2	1	1	3	1	1	**1**	**1**	3	2	**1**	1	1	2	1	**1**	316
2	(United States) Ford XB	Target Chip Ganassi Racing	Michael Andretti	1	3	2	2	4	3	4	2	1	1	4	4	2	1	4	2	258
3	(Japan) Honda	Rahal Hogan Racing	Bobby Rahal	8	6	27	DNQ	7	6	11	17	2	27	23	9	7	9	11	15	69
4	(Germany) Mercedes	Marlboro Team Penske*	Al Unser Jr.*				**1**													22
5	(United States) Buick	Team Menard*	Eddie Cheever*				8													5
	(United States) Chevrolet C	Unknown*	Stéphan Grégoire*				DNQ													0
	(United States) Greenfield V8	Greenfield Industries*	Johnny Parsons*				DNQ													0
Pos	Engine	Top Team	Top Driver	SUR (Australia)	PHX (United States)	LBH (United States)	INDY (United States)	MIL (United States)	BEL (United States)	POR (United States)	CLE (United States)	TOR (Canada)	MIS (United States)	MOH (United States)	NHS (United States)	VAN (Canada)	ROA (United States)	NAZ (United States)	LAG (United States)	Pts

* Indianapolis 500 only

== Bibliography ==
- Shaw, Jeremy, ed. (1994). Autocourse Indy Car 1994-95: Official Yearbook. Richmond, Surrey: Hazleton Publishing. ISBN 978-1-874557-85-2.

== See also ==
- 1994 Indianapolis 500
- 1994 Toyota Atlantic Championship season
- 1994 Indy Lights season
- 1994 Formula One season
