= Lola T94/00 =

Racing car designed and built by Reynard Racing Cars

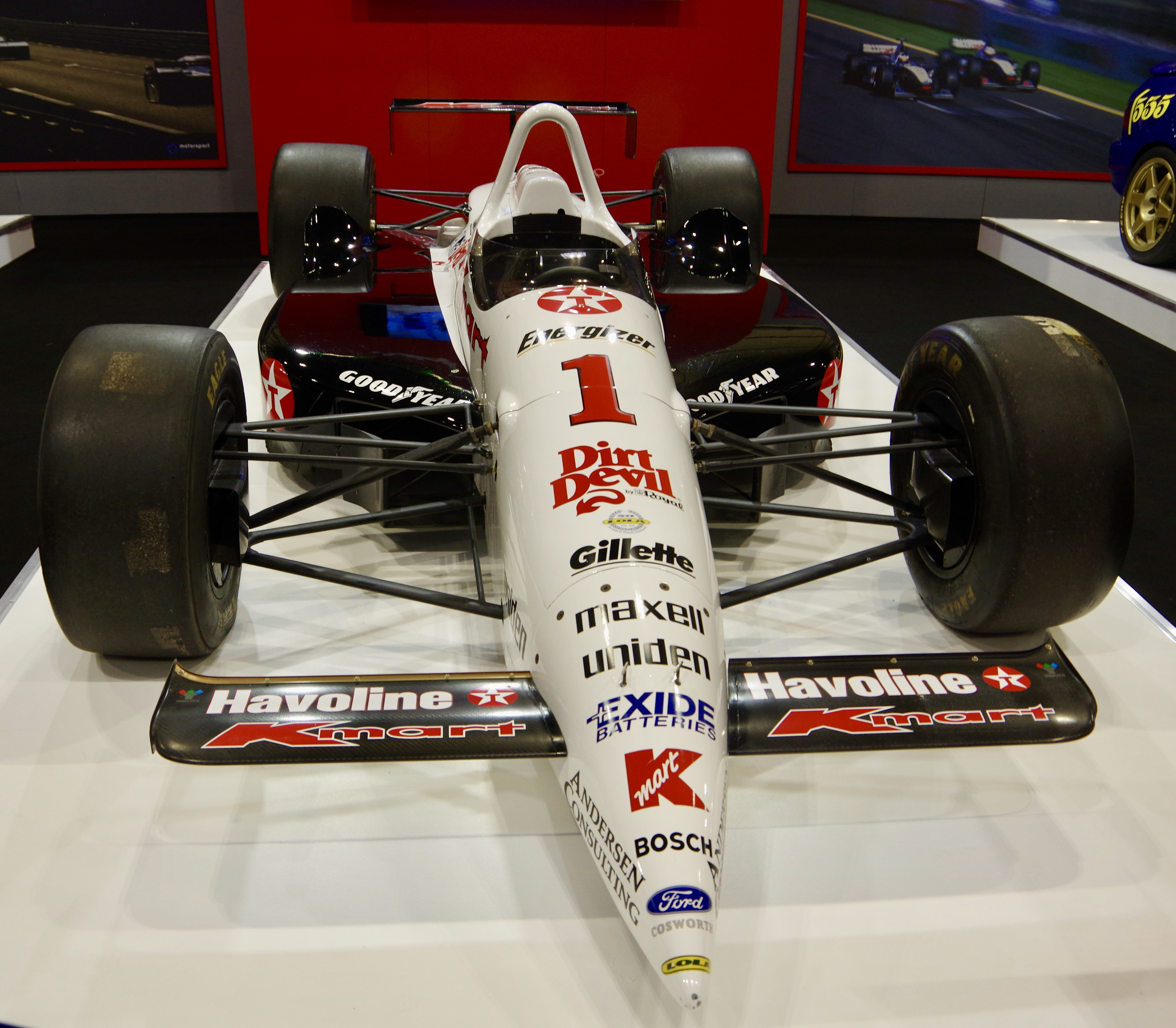
- Category: CART IndyCar
- Constructor: Lola
- Predecessor: Lola T93/00
- Successor: Lola T95/00

Technical specifications
- Length: 4,978 mm (196 in)
- Width: 2,032 mm (80 in)
- Height: 940 mm (37 in)
- Axle track: 1,753 mm (69 in) (Front); 1,638 mm (64 in) (Rear)
- Wheelbase: 3,048 mm (120 in)
- Engine: Ford/Cosworth XB; Honda turbo Indy V8; Ilmor 265-C/D turbo 2.65 L (2,650 cc; 162 cu in) V8 mid-engined
- Transmission: 6-speed manual
- Weight: 1,550 lb (700 kg)
- Fuel: Methanol
- Tyres: Goodyear

Competition history
- Debut: 1994 Australian FAI Indycar Grand Prix

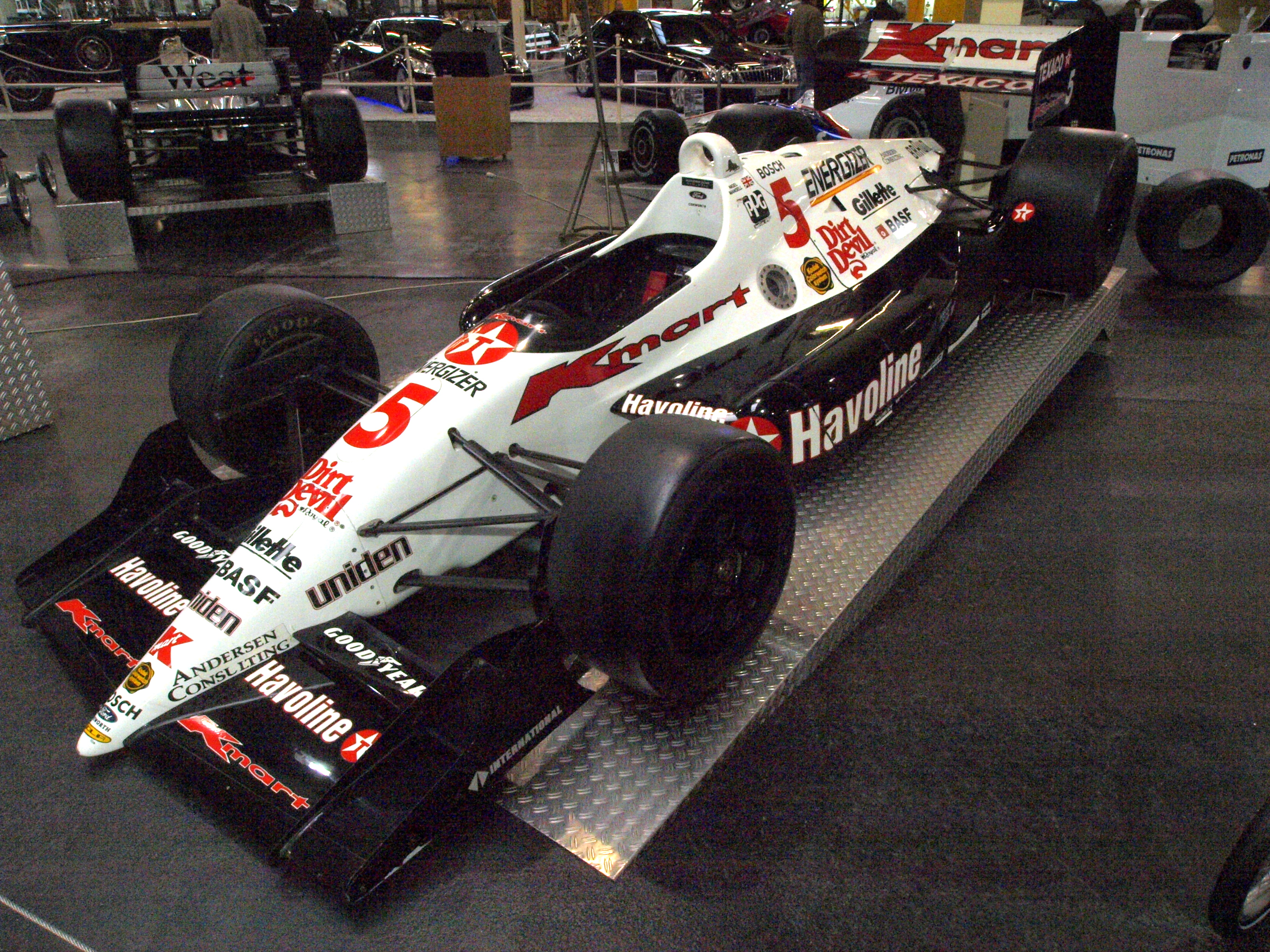
T93/00 chassis on display

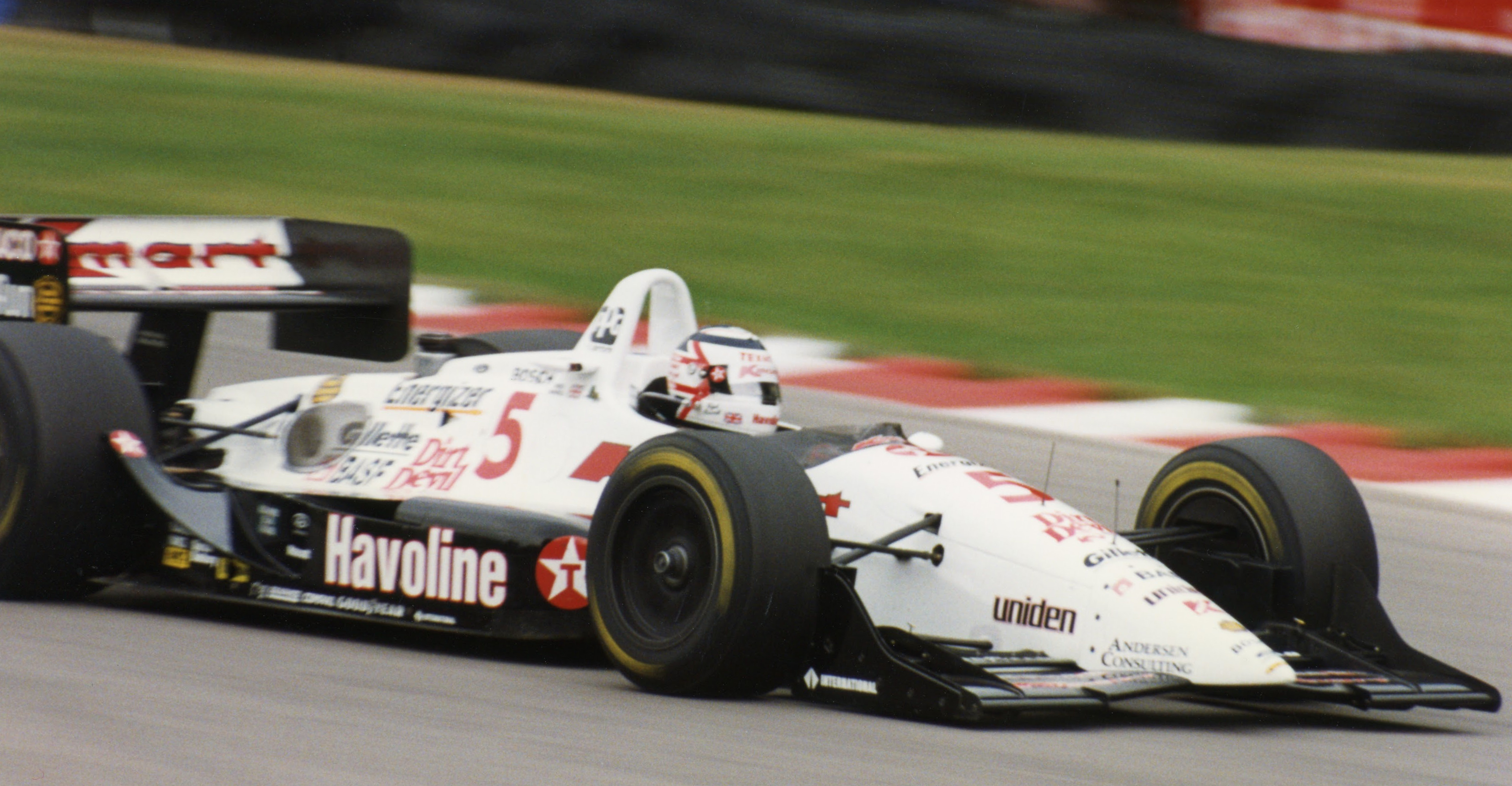
Mansell in a T93/00 chassis at Mid-Ohio in 1993

The Lola T94/00 is an open-wheel racing car chassis, designed and built by Lola Cars that competed in the CART open-wheel racing series, for competition in the 1994 IndyCar season. It wasn't as competitive as its predecessors, only managing to score one win, with Scott Goodyear at the Marlboro 500 in Michigan It was mainly powered by the 800–850 hp (600–630 kW) Ford/Cosworth XB turbo engine, but also used the Honda turbo Indy V8 engine, and the Ilmor 265-C/D Indy V8 turbo.
