= Scott Goodyear =

Canadian racing driver (born 1959)

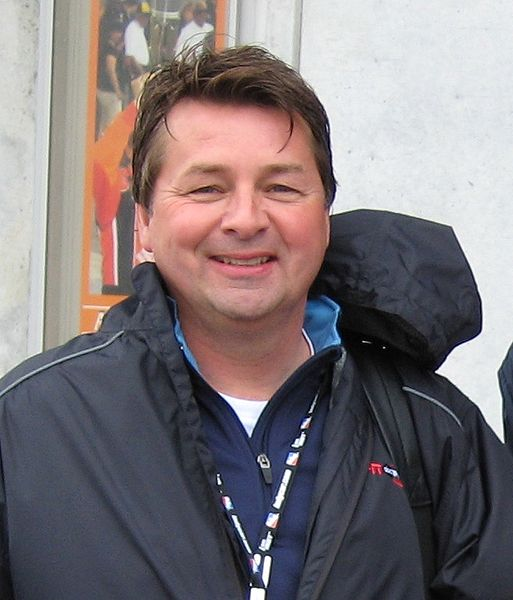
- Goodyear in 2008
- Born: Donald Scott Goodyear; December 20, 1959 (age 66) Toronto, Ontario, Canada

Championship titles
- Major victories Michigan 500 (1992, 1994)

Awards
- 1999 Indy Racing League Most Popular Driver

Champ Car career
- 97 races run over 9 years
- Best finish: 5th (1992)
- First race: 1987 Meadowlands Indy (Meadowlands)
- Last race: 1996 Monterey Grand Prix (Laguna Seca)
- First win: 1992 Michigan 500 (Michigan)
- Last win: 1994 Michigan 500 (Michigan)
Wins	Podiums	Poles
2	6	2

IndyCar Series career
- 39 races run over 5 years
- Best finish: 2nd (2000)
- First race: 1997 Indy 200 at Walt Disney World (Orlando)
- Last race: 2001 Indianapolis 500 (Indianapolis)
- First win: 1999 MCI WorldCom 200 (Phoenix)
- Last win: 2000 Excite 500 (Texas)
Wins	Podiums	Poles
3	12	1

24 Hours of Le Mans career
- Years: 1987, 1996
- Teams: Brun, Porsche AG
- Best finish: 3rd (1996)
- Class wins: 0

Donald Scott Goodyear (born December 20, 1959) is a Canadian retired racing driver. He competed in CART Championship cars and the Indy Racing League. Along with Michael Andretti, Goodyear is the only driver to have won the Michigan 500 more than once, in 1992 and 1994. Goodyear also twice finished second in the Indianapolis 500, both times under contentious circumstances.

Goodyear qualified for eleven runnings of the Indianapolis 500, from 1990 to 2001, missing only the 1996 race, which he did not enter. After starting last (33rd position) in the 1992 race, he finished second to Al Unser Jr. by 0.043 seconds. Goodyear could have won the 1995 race, driving with Tasman Motorsports, but after leading 42 laps, he mistakenly passed the pace car on a late, very slow restart. He was penalized to fourteenth place after ignoring the black flags. That race was eventually won by Jacques Villeneuve. Goodyear again finished second in the 1997 race after being passed by Arie Luyendyk on the back straight on lap 194. A restart on the last lap saw the green and white flag waved despite the on-track lights still signaling yellow. Goodyear, who had expected the race to finish under caution, was weaving his car to keep his tires warm at the time of the restart. Meanwhile, eventual winner Luyendyk had already begun accelerating away from the field.

Goodyear drove in two CART races for Walker Racing in 1996 before a practice accident at the Emerson Fittipaldi Speedway in Rio de Janeiro, Brazil sidelined him for most of the season. In 1997 he moved to the Indy Racing League with Treadway Racing and the next year, he moved to Panther Racing, where he stayed for three seasons just losing out for the series title in 2000 to Buddy Lazier. He retired from his racing career after a crash with Sarah Fisher in the 2001 Indianapolis 500 and then he became a color analyst for ABC and ESPN's coverage of the IndyCar Series, with Paul Page, Jack Arute, Rusty Wallace, Todd Harris, Marty Reid, Allen Bestwick and Eddie Cheever.

In 1988, Goodyear was crowned champion of the Rothmans Porsche Turbo Cup series driving the Pop 84 / Pfaff 944 Turbo race car, winning three out of the eight races. He also co-drove the second of the factory entered Porsche GT1 machines in the 1996 24 Hours of Le Mans with Yannick Dalmas and Karl Wendlinger. They finished third behind the other GT1 and the winning No. 7 Porsche WSC-95 of Joest Racing. Goodyear was inducted into the Canadian Motorsport Hall of Fame in 2002 and the Ontario Sports Hall of Fame in 2014. Goodyear was announced as the Race Director for both the Formula 4 United States Championship and the F3 Americas Championship starting in the 2019 season.

== Racing record ==
=== American open–wheel racing results ===
(key)

==== CART Indy Car World Series ====
Year	Team	Chassis	Engine	1	2	3	4	5	6	7	8	9	10	11	12	13	14	15	16	17	Rank	Points	Ref
1987	Gohr Motorsports	March 87C	Cosworth DFX V8t	LBH	PHX	INDY	MIL	POR	MEA; 22		TOR; 8	MIS	POC	ROA; 20	MDO; 18	NZR	LS; 11	MIA; 15			28th	7	
1987	Gohr Motorsports	March 86C	Cosworth DFX V8t							CLE; 15											28th	7	
1989	Hemelgarn Racing	Lola T89/00	Judd AV V8t	PHX	LBH	INDY	MIL	DET	POR	CLE	MEA	TOR; 23	MIS	POC	MDO	ROA; 23	NZR	LS			48th	0	
1990	O'Donnell Racing Shierson Racing	Lola T89/00	Judd AV V8t	PHX; 10	LBH; 17	INDY; 10	MIL; 10	DET; 8	POR; 22	CLE; 18	MEA; 17	TOR; 9	MIS; 10	DEN; 8	VAN; 7	MDO; 22	ROA; 12	NZR; 10	LS; 14		13th	36	
1991	O'Donnell Racing	Lola T91/00	Judd AV V8t	SRF; 23	LBH; 7	PHX; 21	INDY; 27	MIL; 9	DET; 8	POR; 10	CLE; 19	MEA; 8	TOR; 7	MIS; 15	DEN; 24	VAN; 8	MDO; 11	ROA; 9	NZR; 21	LS; 11	13th	42	
1992	Walker Racing	Lola T91/00	Chevrolet 265A V8t	SRF; 9																	5th	108	
1992	Walker Racing	Lola T92/00	Chevrolet 265A V8t		PHX; 18	LBH; 5	INDY; 2	DET; 22	POR; 8	MIL; 8	NHA; 3	TOR; 6	MIS; 1	CLE; 10	ROA; 20	VAN; 5	MDO; 16	NZR; 4	LS; 26		5th	108	
1993	Walker Racing	Lola T93/00	Ford XB V8t	SRF; 10	**PHX**; 20	LBH; 16	INDY; 7	MIL; 23	DET; 10	POR; 12	CLE; 20	TOR; 9	MIS; 5	NHA; 19	ROA; 10	**VAN**; 4	MDO; 3	NZR; 2	LS; 4		9th	86	
1994	King Racing	Lola T94/00	Ford XB V8t	SRF; 10	PHX; 11	LBH; 19	INDY; 30	MIL; 22	DET; 11	POR; 28	CLE; 14	TOR; 10	MIS; 1	MDO; 22	NHA; 11	VAN; 4	ROA; 7	NZR; 8	LS; 27		12th	55	
1995	Tasman Motorsports	Reynard 95i	Honda HRH V8t	MIA	SRF	PHX	LBH	NZR	INDY; 14	MIL	DET	POR	ROA	TOR	CLE	MIS	MDO; 12	NHA	VAN; 14	LS	32nd	1	
1996	Walker Racing	Reynard 96i	Ford XB V8t	MIA; 12	RIO; DNS	SRF	LBH	NZR	500	MIL	DET	POR	CLE	TOR; 19	MIS	MDO	ROA	VAN; 9	LS; 18		25th	5	

==== Indy Racing League ====
Year	Team	Chassis	No.	Engine	1	2	3	4	5	6	7	8	9	10	11	12	13	Rank	Points	Ref
1996–1997	Treadway Racing	G-Force GF01	6	Oldsmobile Aurora V8	NHM	LVS	WDW; 3	PHX; 17	INDY; 2	TXS; 4	PPIR; 7	CLT; 3	NH2; 16	LV2; 2				**5th**	**226**	
1998	Panther Racing	G-Force GF01B	4	Oldsmobile Aurora V8	WDW; 17	PHX; 6	INDY; 24	TXS; 4	NHM; 2	DOV; 6	CLT; 3	PPIR; 18	ATL; 4	TX2; 22	LVS; 22			**7th**	**244**	
1999	Panther Racing	G-Force GF01C	4	Oldsmobile Aurora V8	WDW; 2	PHX; 1	CLT; C^{1}	INDY; 27	TXS; 1	PPIR; 12	ATL; 16	DOV; 17	PPIR; 21	LVS; 25	TX2; 23			**9th**	**217**	
2000	Panther Racing	Dallara IR-00	4	Oldsmobile Aurora V8	WDW; 4	PHX; 2	LVS; 12	INDY; 9	TXS; 5	PPIR; 16	ATL; 11	**KTY**; 2	TX2; 1					**2nd**	**272**	
2001	Team Cheever	Dallara IR-01	52	Infiniti VRH35ADE V8	PHX	HMS	ATL	INDY; 32	TXS	PPIR	RIR	KAN	NSH	KTY	STL	CHI	TX2	**48th**	**1**	

^{1} The 1999 VisionAire 500K at Charlotte was cancelled after 79 laps due to spectator fatalities. Goodyear qualified 3rd and was running 2nd when it was red-flagged.

==== Indy Racing League career summary ====
Year	Team	Wins	Points	Championship Finish
1997	Treadway Racing	0	226	5th
1998	Panther Racing	0	244	7th
1999	Panther Racing	2	217	9th
2000	Panther Racing	1	272	2nd
2001	Team Cheever	0	1	47th

3 wins, 0 championships

==== Indianapolis 500 ====
Year	Chassis	Engine	No.	Start	Finish	Team
1990	Lola T89/00	Judd AV V8t	28	21	10	O'Donnell/Shierson Racing
1991	Lola T91/00	Judd AV V8t	15	12	27	O'Donnell Racing
1992	Lola T92/00	Chevrolet 265A V8t	15	33	2	Walker Racing
1993	Lola T93/00	Ford-Cosworth XB V8t	2	4	7	Walker Racing
1994	Lola T94/00	Ford-Cosworth XB V8t	40	33	30	King Racing
1995	Reynard 95i	Honda HRH V8t	24	3	14	Tasman Motorsports
1997	G-Force GF01	Oldsmobile Aurora V8	6	5	2	Treadway Racing
1998	G-Force GF01B	Oldsmobile Aurora V8	4	10	24	Panther Racing
1999	G-Force GF01C	Oldsmobile Aurora V8	4	9	27	Panther Racing
2000	Dallara IR-00	Oldsmobile Aurora V8	4	13	9	Panther Racing
2001	Dallara IR-01	Infiniti VRH35ADE V8	52	16	32	Team Cheever

=== Complete 24 Hours of Le Mans results ===
Year	Class	No	Tyres	Car	Team	Co-Drivers	Laps	Pos.	Class Pos.
1987	C1	3	**M**	Porsche 956; Porsche Type-935 2.8L Turbo Flat-6	(Switzerland) Brun Motorsport	(United Kingdom) Bill Adam (Canada) Richard Spenard	120	DNF	DNF
1996	GT1	26	**M**	Porsche 911 GT1; Porsche 3.2L Turbo Flat-6	(Germany) Porsche AG	(Austria) Karl Wendlinger (France) Yannick Dalmas	341	**3rd**	**2nd**

=== International Race of Champions ===
(key) (Bold – Pole position. * – Most laps led.)

International Race of Champions results
Year	Make	1	2	3	4	Pos.	Points	Ref
2001	Pontiac	DAY; 6	TAL; 9	MCH	IND	7th	42	

== See also ==
- List of Canadians in Champ Car

Sporting positions
Preceded by Michael Angus	North American Formula Atlantic; Atlantic Division Champion; 1986	Succeeded by Calvin Fish
