= King Racing =

American auto racing organization

- Owner: Kenny Bernstein
- Base: Huntersville, North Carolina (NASCAR), Indianapolis, Indiana (CART)
- Series: Winston Cup; CART
- Race drivers: Joe Ruttman, Morgan Shepherd, Ricky Rudd, Brett Bodine, Dick Trickle, Steve Kinser, Hut Stricklin
- Manufacturer: Buick, Ford
- Opened: 1986
- Closed: 1995

Career
- Drivers' Championships: 0
- Race victories: 3

King Racing was a racing team which fielded cars in the NASCAR Winston Cup Series as well as in CART and the Indianapolis 500. The team was owned by NHRA drag racing driver Kenny Bernstein.

== NASCAR ==
For its entire run in NASCAR’s top series, King Racing fielded a car numbered 26 and carrying sponsorship from Quaker State Motor Oil. Bernstein fielded Buick Regals until General Motors pulled the brand from NASCAR following the 1991 season; after that, the team competed with Ford Thunderbirds.

King’s first season was 1986 with the 26 being driven by Joe Ruttman with Larry McReynolds, who had begun working in the sport nearly ten years earlier, as crew chief. In 1987 Ruttman was replaced with Morgan Shepherd, and for 1988 Ricky Rudd joined the team.

The team won its first Cup Series race in 1988 with Rudd at The Budweiser at the Glen. Rudd also won the Banquet Frozen Foods 300 at Sears Point Raceway in 1989 on his way to an eighth place points finish.

Rudd left King Racing to take over for Geoff Bodine at Hendrick Motorsports following the 1989 season, and for 1990 Geoff’s brother Brett Bodine took over the 26. He won the First Union 400 at North Wilkesboro, which proved to be the team’s final victory.

Partway through the 1991 season, Robert Yates Racing signed McReynolds away from the 26 to replace Jake Elder as the crew chief to Davey Allison. Bodine, meanwhile, recorded six top tens, including two top five finishes at Martinsville, on his way to a 19th-place finish in the points.

Bodine would stay on with King for three more seasons, competing in a total of 158 races for the team. 1992 saw him finish 15th in the standings with thirteen top ten finishes and two top fives. He recorded nine top tens and three top fives, finishing 20th despite missing the fall race at Dover due to injury. Then, in 1994, Bodine managed a second-place finish in the inaugural Brickyard 400, scoring his last career top five finish. He followed this up with two more top tens, the last at Charlotte in the fall, and finished 19th in points.

In 1995, Bodine left to join Junior Johnson & Associates as the replacement for Bill Elliott following Elliott's decision to become an owner-driver (something Bodine would do a year later), and Steve Kinser was signed away from the World of Outlaws sprint car series to take over. The multiple time world champion had trouble adjusting to the world of stock car racing, and after he finished 40th or worse three times in five starts and failed to qualify for two other races, Kinser was released from the team. Hut Stricklin was brought in to finish the season and recorded two top five finishes and five total top tens.

After a 34th-place finish in points, Bernstein sold his team to Rudd Performance Motorsports at the end of 1995 and returned to focusing strictly on drag racing.

== Indy cars ==
=== 1988 ===
King Racing made their debut during the 1988 season, fielding the No. 15 and 17 Mac Tools Lola T8700-Buick V6 at the Indianapolis 500 with Jim Crawford in No. 15 and Johnny Rutherford in No. 17. Both qualified mid-pack. Crawford led for eight laps (the only laps not led by a Team Penske driver). Crawford was running in second place late in the race. Crawford then ran too low on the track, getting into the grass, and dropped to 6th place during a pit stop to change the damaged tire.

=== 1989–1991 ===
For the 1989 season, the team fielded Crawford again in the No. 15 Mac Tools Lola T8700-Buick V6 at the Indianapolis 500 and qualified in 4th place. Crawford suffered a practice crash. The car was repaired in time to race. Crawford retired with mechanical problems. King Racing did not compete in 1990. They made a return during the 1991 season with Crawford driving the No. 26 Quaker State Lola T9100-Buick V6 and would qualify in 8th place. Crawford would retire with mechanical problems.

=== 1992 ===
For 1992 season King Racing would compete in their first race besides the Indianapolis 500 when Roberto Guerrero drove the No. 36 Quaker State Lola T9100-Buick V6 at the Toyota Grand Prix of Long Beach on the streets of Long Beach; he was however off the pace due to CART ruling not giving V6 engines as much boost. However at the Indianapolis 500 King Racing ran a pair of Quaker State Lola T9200-Buick V6 with Guerrero in No. 36 and Crawford in No. 26. The USAC (who sanctioned the Indianapolis 500) regulations for V6 engines gave them more boost. As a result, Guerrero would qualify on the pole position setting new one-lap and 4-lap records with a 4-lap average of 232 mph and one lap at 233 mph. Crawford was also fast but had mechanical problems on pole day and recovered to qualify. Guerrero would spin out during the parade lap and would fail to start as a result. Crawford was running in the top 10 when he spun into the wall, collecting Rick Mears. Mears' teammate Emerson Fittipaldi also spun and crashed on the same lap.

=== 1993 ===
For 1993 King Racing would expand to a full-time team with Guerrero driving the No. 40 Budweiser King Lola T9300-Ilmor-Chevrolet Indy V8. Jim Crawford would drive No. 80 and Al Unser Sr. in No. 60. At the Indianapolis 500, Guerrero was involved in a crash with Jeff Andretti. Unser led early on but dropped to 13th. Crawford would spin out early on and would not recover. Guerrero would get a best finish of 4th at the New England 200 at New Hampshire Motor Speedway but was replaced by Eddie Cheever for the last few races of the season. Guerrero would finish 14th in points.

=== 1994 ===
For 1994 Scott Goodyear would drive the No. 40 Budweiser King Lola T9400-Ford-Cosworth XB. At the Indianapolis 500 the team hired Davy Jones to drive a spare car numbered 40T (it would be changed to 60 on race day). Goodyear would fail to qualify while Jones would qualify. So Goodyear would replace Jones on race day but retired with mechanical problems early on. Goodyear gave King Racing their only CART win when he drove to victory at the Marlboro 500 at Michigan International Speedway. Goodyear finished 12th in points (King Racing's highest CART position in points).

The 1994 season was the last in CART for King Racing, as Bernstein opted to shut the team down.

== Driver history ==
=== CART IndyCar ===
- (Scotland) Jim Crawford (1988–1989, 1991–1993)
- (United States) Johnny Rutherford (1988)
- (Australia) Geoff Brabham (1991)
- (Colombia) Roberto Guerrero (1991–1993)
- (United States) Willy T. Ribbs (1991)
- (United States) Eddie Cheever (1993)
- (United States) Al Unser (1993)
- (Canada) Scott Goodyear (1994)
- (Italy) Andrea Montermini (1994)

=== NASCAR ===
- (United States) Joe Ruttman (1986)
- (United States) Morgan Shepherd (1987)
- (United States) Ricky Rudd (1988–1989)
- (United States) Brett Bodine (1990–1994)
- (United States) Dick Trickle (1993; injury replacement at Dover)
- (United States) Steve Kinser (1995, replaced after North Wilkesboro)
- (United States) Hut Stricklin (1995)

== Racing results ==
=== Complete CART Indy Car World Series results ===
(key)

Year	Chassis	Engine	Drivers	No.	1	2	3	4	5	6	7	8	9	10	11	12	13	14	15	16	17
1988					PHX	LBH	INDY	MIL	POR	CLE	TOR	MEA	MCH	POC	MDO	ROA	NAZ	LAG	MIA		
1988	Lola T87/00	Buick 3300 V6t	(United Kingdom) Jim Crawford	15			6														
1988	Lola T87/00	Buick 3300 V6t	(United States) Johnny Rutherford	17			22														
1989					PHX	LBH	INDY	MIL	DET	POR	CLE	MEA	TOR	MCH	POC	MDO	ROA	NAZ	LAG		
1989	Lola T87/00	Buick 3300 V6t	(United Kingdom) Jim Crawford	15			19														
1991					SFR	LBH	PHX	INDY	MIL	DET	POR	CLE	MEA	TOR	MCH	DEN	VAN	MDO	ROA	NAZ	LAG
1991	Lola T91/00	Buick 3300 V6t	(United Kingdom) Jim Crawford	26				26													
1991	Lola T91/00	Buick 3300 V6t	(Colombia) Roberto Guerrero	26						15						19					18
1992					SFR	PHX	LBH	INDY	DET	POR	MIL	NHA	TOR	MCH	CLE	ROA	VAN	MDO	NAZ	LAG	
1992	Lola T92/00	Buick 3300 V6t	(United Kingdom) Jim Crawford	26				25													
1992	Lola T91/00	Buick 3300 V6t	(Colombia) Roberto Guerrero	26			13														
1992	Lola T92/00	Buick 3300 V6t	(Colombia) Roberto Guerrero	36				33													
1993					SFR	PHX	LBH	INDY	MIL	DET	POR	CLE	TOR	MCH	NHA	ROA	VAN	MDO	NAZ	LAG	
1993	Lola T93/00	Chevrolet 265C V8t	(Colombia) Roberto Guerrero	40	19	15	5	28	7	26	24	29	10	7	4	23	11				
1993	Lola T93/00	Chevrolet 265C V8t	(United States) Eddie Cheever	40														28	10	14	
1993	Lola T93/00	Chevrolet 265C V8t	(United Kingdom) Jim Crawford	60				24													
1993	Lola T93/00	Chevrolet 265C V8t	(United States) Al Unser	80				12													
1994					SFR	PHX	LBH	INDY	MIL	DET	POR	CLE	TOR	MCH	MDO	NHA	VAN	ROA	NAZ	LAG	
1994	Lola T94/00	Ford XB V8t	(Canada) Scott Goodyear	40	10	11	19	30	22	11	28	14	10	1	22	11	4	7	8	27	
1994	Lola T94/00	Ford XB V8t	(Italy) Andrea Montermini	60								16	7								

=== IndyCar win ===
#	Season	Date	Sanction	Track / Race	No.	Winning Driver	Chassis	Engine	Tire	Grid	Laps Led
1	1994	July 31	CART	Michigan 500 (O)	40	(Canada) Scott Goodyear	Lola T94/00	Ford XB V8t	Goodyear	12	26

=== Complete NASCAR Winston Cup Series results ===
Year	Driver	No.	Make	1	2	3	4	5	6	7	8	9	10	11	12	13	14	15	16	17	18	19	20	21	22	23	24	25	26	27	28	29	30	31	Owners	Pts
1986	Joe Ruttman	26	Buick	DAY; 28	RCH; 2	CAR; 33	ATL; 42	BRI; 19	DAR; 21	NWS; 5	MAR; 2	TAL; 17	DOV; 11	CLT; 32	RSD; 42	POC; 7	MCH; 9	DAY; 7	POC; 38	TAL; 8	GLN; 33	MCH; 30	BRI; 17	DAR; 38	RCH; 6	DOV; 6	MAR; 5	NWS; 6	CLT; 25	CAR; 9	ATL; 9	RSD; 5			15th	3295
1987	Morgan Shepherd	26	Buick	DAY; 16	CAR; 5	RCH; 31	ATL; 10	DAR; 22	NWS; 27	BRI; 8	MAR; 17	TAL; 10	CLT; 2	DOV; 32	POC; 31	RSD; 35	MCH; 25	DAY; 5	POC; 36	TAL; 39	GLN; 22	MCH; 3	BRI; 24	DAR; 9	RCH; 30	DOV; 40	MAR; 5	NWS; 4	CLT; 20	CAR; 5	RSD; 25	ATL; 39			17th	3099
1988	Ricky Rudd	26	Buick	DAY; 17	RCH; 2	CAR; 17	ATL; 24	DAR; 30	BRI; 20	NWS; 2	MAR; 18	TAL; 29	CLT; 7	DOV; 19	RSD; 3	POC; 30	MCH; 11	DAY; 22	POC; 12	TAL; 41	GLN; 1	MCH; 16	BRI; 16	DAR; 10	RCH; 26	DOV; 10	MAR; 24*	CLT; 8	NWS; 7*	CAR; 2	PHO; 26*	ATL; 4			11th	3547
1989	Ricky Rudd	26	Buick	DAY; 19	CAR; 32	ATL; 24	RCH; 4	DAR; 12	BRI; 8	NWS; 6	MAR; 23	TAL; 31	CLT; 10	DOV; 6	SON; 1*	POC; 20	MCH; 4	DAY; 9	POC; 31	TAL; 17	GLN; 29	MCH; 8	BRI; 3	DAR; 3	RCH; 4	DOV; 5	MAR; 8	CLT; 21	NWS; 9	CAR; 28	PHO; 29	ATL; 14			8th	3608
1990	Brett Bodine	26	Buick	DAY; 17	RCH; 8	CAR; 25	ATL; 11	DAR; 8	BRI; 22	NWS; 1*	MAR; 12	TAL; 12	CLT; 29	DOV; 18	SON; 41	POC; 4	MCH; 14	DAY; 22	POC; 16	TAL; 33	GLN; 3	MCH; 17	BRI; 25	DAR; 10	RCH; 31	DOV; 20	MAR; 4	NWS; 3	CLT; 8	CAR; 17	PHO; 15	ATL; 18			13th	3440
1991	Brett Bodine	26	Buick	DAY; 22	RCH; 24	CAR; 13	ATL; 15	DAR; 16	BRI; 22	NWS; 30*	MAR; 4	TAL; 11	CLT; 28	DOV; 33	SON; 11	POC; 33	MCH; 36	DAY; 36	POC; 8	TAL; 32	GLN; 25	MCH; 37	BRI; 10	DAR; 14	RCH; 18	DOV; 32	MAR; 2	NWS; 7	CLT; 8	CAR; 30	PHO; 14	ATL; 29			19th	2980
1992	Brett Bodine	26	Ford	DAY; 41	CAR; 8	RCH; 33	ATL; 20	DAR; 6	BRI; 11	NWS; 10	MAR; 8	TAL; 16	CLT; 20	DOV; 30	SON; 15	POC; 8	MCH; 19	DAY; 12	POC; 8	TAL; 10	GLN; 10	MCH; 12	BRI; 9	DAR; 4	RCH; 18	DOV; 22	MAR; 3	NWS; 7	CLT; 28	CAR; 7	PHO; 12	ATL; 40			15th	3491
1993	Brett Bodine	26	Ford	DAY; 17	CAR; 22	RCH; 32	ATL; 8	DAR; 12	BRI; 9	NWS; 17	MAR; 7	TAL; 30	SON; 24	CLT; 41	DOV; 16	POC; 29	MCH; 39	DAY; 19	NHA; 13	POC; 5	TAL; 9	GLN; 20	MCH; 14	BRI; 7	DAR; 2	RCH; 5		MAR; 6	NWS; 21	CLT; 15	CAR; 35	PHO; 28	ATL; 40		20th	3271
1993	Dick Trickle	26	Ford																								DOV; 25								20th	3271
1994	Brett Bodine	26	Ford	DAY; 32	CAR; 6	RCH; 8	ATL; 31	DAR; 36	BRI; 13	NWS; 23	MAR; 24	TAL; 17	SON; 13	CLT; 42	DOV; 32	POC; 8	MCH; 32	DAY; 16	NHA; 12	POC; 35	TAL; 17	IND; 2	GLN; 28	MCH; 12	BRI; 14	DAR; 29	RCH; 8	DOV; 26	MAR; 30	NWS; 33	CLT; 6	CAR; 18	PHO; 13	ATL; 36	19th	3159
1995	Steve Kinser	26	Ford	DAY; 40	CAR; 27	RCH; 28	ATL; 41	DAR; 40	BRI; DNQ	NWS; DNQ																									34th	2369
1995	Hut Stricklin	26	Ford								MAR; 33	TAL; 24	SON; 33	CLT; 7	DOV; 4	POC; 5	MCH; 37	DAY; 16	NHA; 27	POC; 41	TAL; 36	IND; 22	GLN; 40	MCH; 10	BRI; 33	DAR; 7	RCH; 32	DOV; 38	MAR; 36	NWS; 25	CLT; 18	CAR; 28	PHO; 35	ATL; 38	34th	2369
