= 1994 Australian FAI Indycar Grand Prix =

Coordinates: 27°59′17.9″S 153°25′42.1″E

(Australia) 1994 Surfers Paradise
Race details
- Race 1 of 16 in the 1994 IndyCar season
- Map of the track
- Date: 20 March, 1994
- Official name: 1994 Australian FAI Indycar Grand Prix
- Location: Surfers Paradise Street Circuit; Queensland, Australia
- Course: Temporary Street Circuit; 2.794 mi / 4.496 km
- Distance: 55 laps 153.670 mi / 247.280 km
- Weather: Rain

Pole position
- Driver: (United Kingdom) Nigel Mansell (Newman-Haas Racing)
- Time: 1:34.877

Fastest lap
- Driver: (United Kingdom) Nigel Mansell (Newman-Haas Racing)
- Time: 1:37.487 (on lap 15 of 55)

Podium
- First: (United States) Michael Andretti (Target Chip Ganassi Racing)
- Second: (Brazil) Emerson Fittipaldi (Marlboro Team Penske)
- Third: (United States) Mario Andretti (Newman-Haas Racing)

The 1994 Australian FAI Indycar Grand Prix was the opening round of the 1994 CART World Series season, held on 20 March 1994 on the Surfers Paradise Street Circuit, Australia.

Nigel Mansell, the defending winner and CART series champion, won the pole position in Newman-Haas's new Lola T94/00. Alongside on the grid was Michael Andretti, who was beginning his comeback to the CART series with Chip Ganassi Racing after spending a year in Formula One. Starting in eighth position was future CART and Formula One champion Jacques Villeneuve, making his first start in the CART series. It was also the IndyCar debut of the Reynard chassis and the Honda engine.

The race start was delayed because of changing wet weather conditions and accidents during each of the first two attempts. The first incident occurred in Turn 12 (the final corner) and collected Raul Boesel, Willy T. Ribbs, Robbie Buhl, and Alessandro Zampedri. The second aborted start saw further carnage; this time in the second chicane involving Boesel and Zampedri again, along with Mario Andretti, Hiro Matsushita, and Davy Jones slowed the field. Bobby Rahal hit the tyre wall in the first chicane, apparently on his own, and Paul Tracy and Adrian Fernandez spun off in Turn 4, both cars undamaged. Boesel retired, while Jones and Matsushita were eventually push-started and continued in the race. However, Matsushita returned to the pits for a new rear wing as the marshals had accidentally broken off his already-damaged rear wing in their attempt to push the car away. Fernandez turned around in the escape road and continued on, however the marshals were busy dealing with the first-chicane accident and Tracy sat against the turn 4 tyre wall for a full lap under yellow before the marshals could give him a push-start. Rahal later stated in an interview with ABC's Jack Arute that he was bumped from behind coming to the green flag and into another car. This broke the front wing, which then ran under the nose of the car, causing it to lose steering.

The race finally restarted around 4 p.m.

Michael Andretti got by Mansell after the start (the third attempt), as did Robby Gordon. In Turn 5 he muscled his way past Mansell, who soon outbraked the Californian in the same place. On Lap 17 Gordon spun and crashed after he clipped too much curb in the backstretch chicanes. Lap 20 saw the exit of Mark Smith, who locked up the right front, and Zampedri (in his third incident of the race) who seemed to be watching Smith rather than the road. As a result, he braked too late for the corner, locking up his right-front tire and slid off the track into Smith.

On the 4th restart, Andretti caught a huge break when Mansell spun on the damp track in front of Emerson Fittipaldi and Teo Fabi. A moment later in the second chicane Michael slid into the tyre barrier but continued on undamaged. Mansell later spun off in Turn 9 while passing Maurício Gugelmin. He spun the car around, but bumped the wall with the left rear tyre and stalled the engine. On Lap 38 Stefan Johansson and rookie Jacques Villeneuve touched coming towards Turn 9, ending the Canadian's IndyCar debut early. Later on, because of the delays, darkness fell over the circuit. Former racer Chip Ganassi, whose car was in the lead, was very concerned about visibility. He pleaded with CART to end the race after saying to ABC's Gary Gerould "This is a dangerous situation! The lights are on along the pits here! The lights are on at the Marriott hotel...the race needs to be stopped!" The circuit was lit during the end of the race, but not sufficiently to run safely as a night race, and the 65 lap distance was shortened by 10 laps due to darkness. Andretti, leading all 55 laps, won in his Ganassi debut, which was also Reynard's first IndyCar race. This continued their record of winning on their debut in various categories including Formula 3 and F3000. Emerson Fittipaldi, driving the new Penske PC-23, finished second, followed by Mario Andretti, who began his final CART season with the final podium finish of his Indy car career. Jimmy Vasser and Stefan Johansson rounded out the Top five.

== Qualifying results ==
| Pos | Nat | Name | Team | Car | Time |
|---|---|---|---|---|---|
| 1 | (United Kingdom) | Nigel Mansell | Newman-Haas Racing | Lola T94/00-Ford-Cosworth XB | 1:34.877 |
| 2 | (United States) | Michael Andretti | Chip Ganassi Racing | Reynard 94I-Ford-Cosworth XB | 1:35.568 |
| 3 | (Brazil) | Emerson Fittipaldi | Team Penske | Penske PC-23-94-Ilmor/D | 1:36.023 |
| 4 | (Mexico) | Adrián Fernández | Galles Racing | Reynard 94I-Ilmor/D | 1:36.091 |
| 5 | (United States) | Al Unser Jr. | Team Penske | Penske PC-23-94-Ilmor/D | 1:36.394 |
| 6 | (Canada) | Paul Tracy | Team Penske | Penske PC-23-94-Ilmor/D | 1:36.398 |
| 7 | (Brazil) | Maurício Gugelmin | Chip Ganassi Racing | Reynard 94I-Ford-Cosworth XB | 1:36.405 |
| 8 | (Canada) | Jacques Villeneuve (R) | Forsythe/Green Racing | Reynard 94I-Ford-Cosworth XB | 1:36.480 |
| 9 | (United States) | Robby Gordon | Walker Racing | Lola T94/00-Ford-Cosworth XB | 1:36.678 |
| 10 | (United States) | Jimmy Vasser | Hayhoe Racing | Reynard 94I-Ford-Cosworth XB | 1:36.877 |
| 11 | (Italy) | Teo Fabi | Jim Hall Racing | Reynard 94I-Ilmor/D | 1:36.925 |
| 12 | (Sweden) | Stefan Johansson | Bettenhausen Motorsports | Penske PC-23-93-Ilmor/D | 1:37.328 |
| 13 | (United States) | Mark Smith | Walker Racing | Lola T94/00-Ford-Cosworth XB | 1:37.476 |
| 14 | (United States) | Mike Groff | Rahal/Hogan Racing | Lola T93/07-Honda | 1:37.633 |
| 15 | (Netherlands) | Arie Luyendyk | Indy Regency Racing | Lola T94/00-Ilmor/D | 1:37.739 |
| 16 | (United States) | Bobby Rahal | Rahal/Hogan Racing | Lola T93/00-Honda | 1:37.783 |
| 17 | (Canada) | Scott Goodyear | Budweiser King Racing | Lola T94/00-Ford-Cosworth XB | 1:37.835 |
| 18 | (United States) | Scott Sharp (R) | PacWest Racing Group | Lola T94/00-Ford-Cosworth XB | 1:37.940 |
| 19 | (United States) | Mario Andretti | Newman-Haas Racing | Lola T94/00-Ford-Cosworth XB | 1:37.940 |
| W* | (Italy) | Andrea Montermini | Dale Coyne Racing | Lola T93/06-Ford-Cosworth XB | 1:37.959 |
| 20 | (Brazil) | Raul Boesel | Dick Simon Racing | Lola T94/00-Ford-Cosworth XB | 1:38.002 |
| 21 | (Italy) | Alessandro Zampedri (R) | Euromotorsport | Lola T93/07-Ilmor/C | 1:38.908 |
| 22 | (United States) | Willy T. Ribbs | Walker Racing | Lola T93/06-Ford-Cosworth XB | 1:38.948 |
| 23 | (Japan) | Hiro Matsushita | Dick Simon Racing | Lola T94/00-Ford-Cosworth XB | 1:39.089 |
| 24 | (United States) | Robbie Buhl | Dale Coyne Racing | Lola T93/06-Ford-Cosworth XB | 1:39.122 |
| 25 | (United States) | Davy Jones | A. J. Foyt Enterprises | Lola T92/00-Ford-Cosworth XB | 1:39.729 |
| 26 | (United States) | Dominic Dobson | PacWest Racing Group | Lola T94/00-Ford-Cosworth XB | 1:39.729 |
| 27 | (Australia) | Gary Brabham (R) | Bettenhausen Motorsports | Penske PC22-93-Ilmor/C | 1:40.117 |
| DNQ | (Brazil) | Marco Greco | Arciero Racing | Lola T94/00-Ford-Cosworth XB | 1:40.571 |
| DNQ | (United States) | Buddy Lazier | Leader Card Racing | Lola T93/07-Ilmor/C | 1:41.164 |
| DNQ | (United States) | Dave Kudrave | Euromotorsport | Lola T92/00-Ilmor/A | No time |

R = Rookie driver, DNQ = Did not qualify, W = Withdrew

*Andrea Montermini withdrew from the race after a crash during Saturday morning practice.

== Race ==
| Pos | No | Driver | Team | Laps | Time/retired | Grid | Points |
|---|---|---|---|---|---|---|---|
| 1 | 8 | (United States) Michael Andretti | Chip Ganassi Racing | 55 | 1:44:58.169 | 2 | 21 |
| 2 | 2 | (Brazil) Emerson Fittipaldi | Team Penske | 55 | +0.2 secs | 3 | 16 |
| 3 | 6 | (United States) Mario Andretti | Newman-Haas Racing | 55 | +7.3 secs | 19 | 14 |
| 4 | 18 | (United States) Jimmy Vasser | Hayhoe Racing | 55 | +38.6 secs | 10 | 12 |
| 5 | 16 | (Sweden) Stefan Johansson | Bettenhausen Motorsports | 55 | +1:03.1 secs | 12 | 10 |
| 6 | 88 | (Brazil) Maurício Gugelmin | Chip Ganassi Racing | 55 | +1:22.6 secs | 7 | 8 |
| 7 | 11 | (Italy) Teo Fabi | Jim Hall Racing | 54 | + 1 lap | 11 | 6 |
| 8 | 10 | (United States) Mike Groff | Rahal/Hogan Racing | 54 | + 1 lap | 14 | 5 |
| 9 | 1 | (United Kingdom) Nigel Mansell | Newman-Haas Racing | 54 | + 1 lap | 1 | 5 |
| 10 | 40 | (Canada) Scott Goodyear | King Racing | 53 | + 2 laps | 17 | 3 |
| 11 | 71 | (United States) Scott Sharp (R) | PacWest Racing Group | 53 | + 2 laps | 18 | 2 |
| 12 | 17 | (United States) Dominic Dobson | PacWest Racing Group | 52 | + 3 laps | 26 | 1 |
| 13 | 7 | (Mexico) Adrián Fernández | Galles Racing | 52 | + 3 laps | 4 | |
| 14 | 31 | (United States) Al Unser Jr. | Team Penske | 51 | Electrical | 5 | |
| 15 | 22 | (Japan) Hiro Matsushita | Dick Simon Racing | 48 | + 7 laps | 22 | |
| 16 | 3 | (Canada) Paul Tracy | Team Penske | 39 | Electrical | 6 | |
| 17 | 12 | (Canada) Jacques Villeneuve (R) | Forsythe/Green Racing | 36 | Contact | 3 | |
| 18 | 24 | (United States) Willy T. Ribbs | Walker Racing | 34 | Contact | 22 | |
| 19 | 14 | (United States) Davy Jones | A. J. Foyt Enterprises | 31 | Transmission | 25 | |
| 20 | 19 | (United States) Robbie Buhl | Dale Coyne Racing | 30 | Oil pressure | 24 | |
| 21 | 15 | (United States) Mark Smith | Walker Racing | 19 | Contact | 13 | |
| 22 | 50 | (Italy) Alessandro Zampedri (R) | Euromotorsport | 19 | Contact | 21 | |
| 23 | 9 | (United States) Robby Gordon | Walker Racing | 16 | Contact | 9 | |
| 24 | 76 | (Australia) Gary Brabham (R) | Bettenhausen Motorsports | 10 | Transmission | 27 | |
| 25 | 28 | (Netherlands) Arie Luyendyk | Indy Regency Racing | 8 | Transmission | 15 | |
| 26 | 4 | (United States) Bobby Rahal | Rahal/Hogan Racing | 0 | Contact | 16 | |
| 27 | 5 | (Brazil) Raul Boesel | Dick Simon Racing | 0 | Contact | 20 | |

== Notes ==
- Average Speed: 80.994 mph (130.347 km/h)
- Lead changes: 1 among 1 driver

Lap Leaders
| Laps | Leader |
|---|---|
| 1-55 | Michael Andretti |

Cautions: 3 for 16 laps
| Laps | Reason |
|---|---|
| 1-5 | Boesel, Mario Andretti, Jones, Dobson, Buhl, Matsushita, Ribbs and Zampedri Accident |
| 18-22 | Gordon Accident |
| 23-27 | Mansell Spun |

== Standings after the race ==
Drivers' Championship standings

| Pos | Driver | Points |
|---|---|---|
| 1 | (United States) Michael Andretti | 21 |
| 2 | (Brazil) Emerson Fittipaldi | 16 |
| 3 | (United States) Mario Andretti | 14 |
| 4 | (United States) Jimmy Vasser | 12 |
| 5 | (Sweden) Stefan Johansson | 10 |

| Previous race: | PPG Indy Car World Series; 1994 season | Next race: 1994 Slick-50 200 |
| Previous race: 1993 Australian FAI IndyCar Grand Prix | 1994 Australian FAI IndyCar Grand Prix | Next race: 1995 Indycar Australia |
