= Lola T93/00 =

Racing car designed and built by Lola Cars

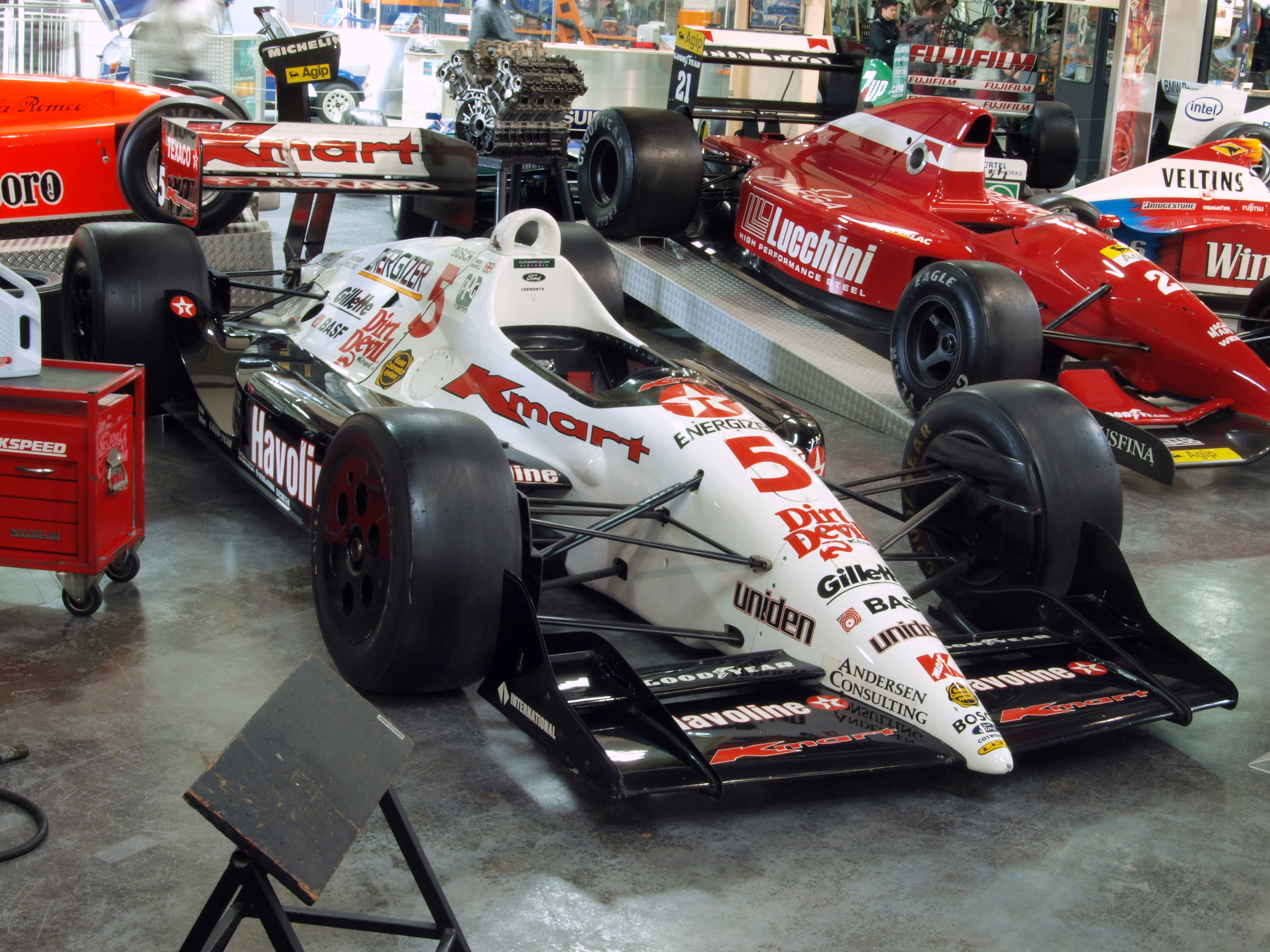
- Category: CART IndyCar
- Constructor: Lola
- Predecessor: Lola T92/00
- Successor: Lola T94/00

Technical specifications
- Length: 4,978 mm (196 in)
- Width: 2,032 mm (80 in)
- Height: 940 mm (37 in)
- Axle track: 1,753 mm (69 in) (Front); 1,638 mm (64 in) (Rear)
- Wheelbase: 3,048 mm (120 in)
- Engine: Ford/Cosworth XB 2.65 L (2,650 cc; 162 cu in) V8 mid-engined
- Transmission: 6-speed manual
- Weight: 1,550 lb (700 kg)
- Fuel: Methanol
- Tyres: Goodyear

Competition history
- Debut: 1993 Australian FAI IndyCar Grand Prix

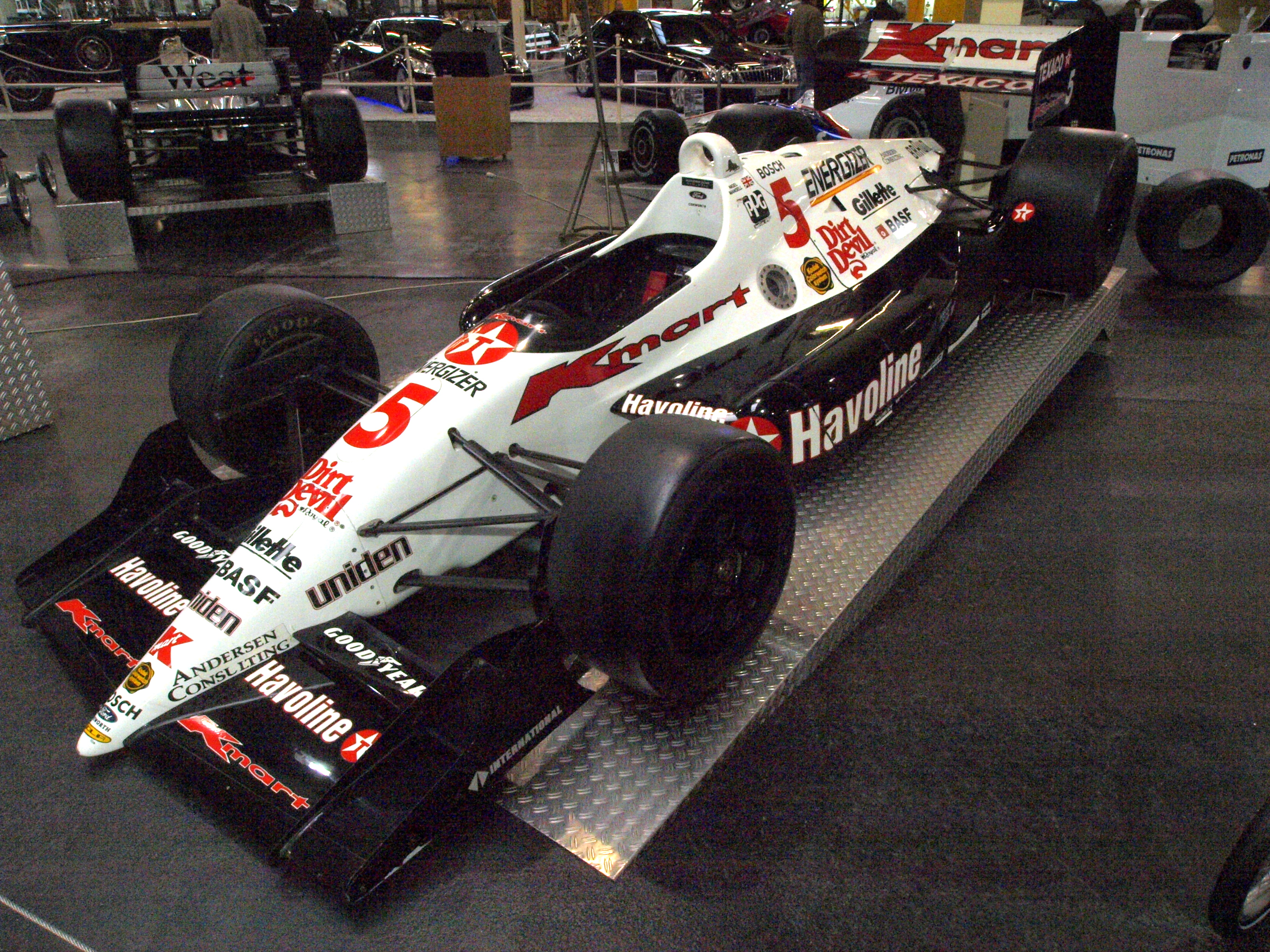
T93/00 chassis on display

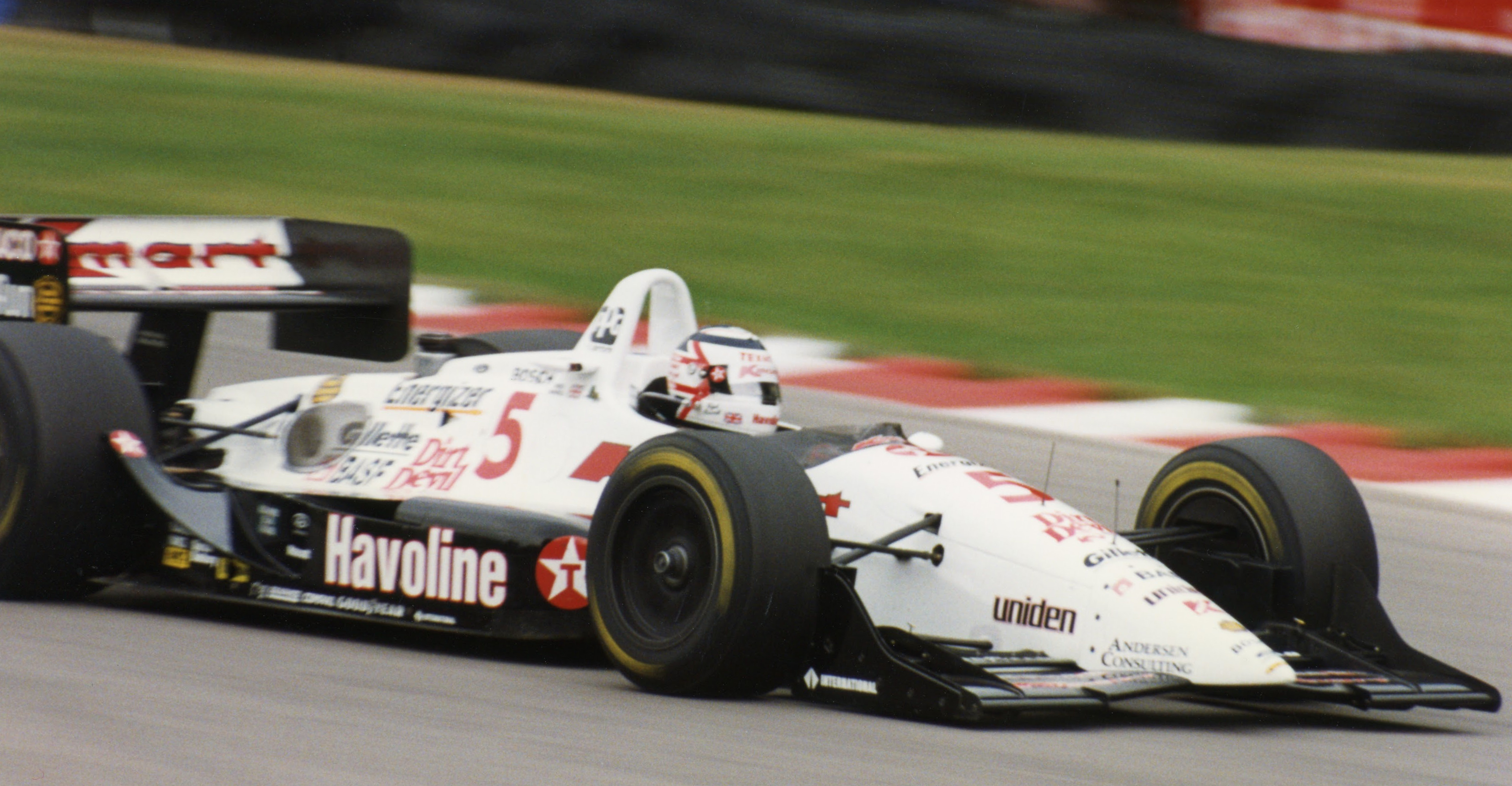
Mansell in a T93/00 chassis at Mid-Ohio in 1993

The Lola T93/00 is a highly successful open-wheel racing car chassis, designed and built by Lola Cars that competed in the CART open-wheel racing series, for competition in the 1993 season. It was extremely competitive, winning 8 races that season, including a win for rookie Nigel Mansell on debut in Australia. It also gave teammate Mario Andretti a win, as well as giving Al Unser Jr. and Danny Sullivan a win each. It was mainly powered by the 800–850 hp (600–630 kW) Ford/Cosworth XB turbo engine. It powered Nigel Mansell to his maiden first and only IndyCar World Championship.
