= 1995 Michigan 500 =

Coordinates: 42°03′58.68″N 84°14′29.18″W

(United States) 1995 Michigan 500
Race details
- Race 13 of 17 in the 1995 CART season
- Date: July 30, 1995
- Official name: 1995 Marlboro 500
- Location: Michigan International Speedway, Brooklyn, Michigan, United States
- Course: Permanent racing facility 2.000 mi / 3.219 km
- Distance: 250 laps 500.000 mi / 804.672 km
- Weather: Cloudless and sunny with temperatures up to 88.9 °F (31.6 °C); wind speeds reaching up to 10.2 miles per hour (16.4 km/h)

Pole position
- Driver: (United States) Parker Johnstone (Comptech Racing)
- Time: 31.242; 230.458 mph (370.886 km/h)

Fastest lap
- Driver: (United States) Parker Johnstone (Comptech Racing)
- Time: 31.080 231.66 mph (372.82 km/h) (on lap 115 of 250)

Podium
- First: (United States) Scott Pruett (Patrick Racing)
- Second: (United States) Al Unser Jr. (Team Penske)
- Third: (Mexico) Adrian Fernández (Galles Racing)

The 1995 Michigan 500 was the thirteenth round of the 1995 PPG Indy Car World Series season. Branded as the 1995 Marlboro 500 for sponsorship reasons, the race was held on July 30, 1995, at the 2.00 mi Michigan International Speedway in Brooklyn, Michigan. The race marked Firestone's first Indy Car victory since 1974. Patrick Racing driver Scott Pruett took his first win in American open-wheel competition after a late-race battle with defending series champion Al Unser Jr., winning by just over half a second. Adrian Fernández came in third place, one lap behind Pruett and Unser. Parker Johnstone earned his first pole position and fastest lap in the series but suffered brake problems that forced him to retire; rookie André Ribeiro led the first ever laps of his career, ultimately earning a point for leading the most laps during the race. Danny Sullivan's IndyCar career would come to an end at leader's lap 194 as he would be involved in a crash where he would suffer a broken pelvis and other injuries.

This was the first time the series competed on the newly resurfaced circuit, which made the track smoother and easier to drive on. Nevertheless, the race still saw massive attrition knock out many of the front-runners over the grueling 500-mile distance. Many cars suffered problems with failing wheel bearings and blistering tires. By the halfway point in the race, it was essentially a two-horse race between Pruett and Unser while the rest of the field simply struggled to make it to the end. Points leader Jacques Villeneuve, despite spending extensive time on pit lane trying to diagnose an engine problem, managed to finish tenth and keep his substantial lead in the points standings.

== Background ==
In 1994, Tony George, president of the Indianapolis Motor Speedway, founded the Indy Racing League (IRL), to begin competition in 1996. It would exist as a separate championship, and leveraged the fame of the Indianapolis 500, which was placed as its centerpiece. The majority of teams that raced in CART chose not to enter the new series, meaning 1995 was the final Michigan 500 with a unified Indy car.

Firestone returned to IndyCar racing for the first time since 1974. Entering the Michigan 500, Goodyear had won every race in the 1995 CART season.

After years of being defined by a bumpy surface, Michigan International Speedway was repaved in early 1995, for the first time since 1986. In order to keep speeds down, CART officials instituted aerodynamic restrictions and a reduction in turbocharger boost pressure from 45 inches to 40 inches. It was estimated these changes would reduce the power of the engines by about 70 horsepower.

Jacques Villeneuve won the 1995 Indianapolis 500 and entered the Michigan 500 with a 33 point lead in the series standings. Scott Goodyear had won two of the last three Michigan 500s but was not entered in the 1995 race as his team was only running a part time schedule.

== Practice and Time Trials ==
In Friday's opening practice session, rookie driver André Ribeiro had the fastest speed at 230.834 mph. Paul Tracy was second fastest at 229.757 mph, followed by Michael Andretti at 229.144 mph.

During practice Robby Gordon crashed hard in turn three, impacting the wall with the right side with a force of 116-Gs and was knocked unconscious. Team-owner Derrick Walker said the crash was caused by a left-rear wishbone failure. Gordon was hospitalized overnight with a concussion and returned to the track the following day. Despite getting approval from a neurologist to race, CART rules stated that anytime a driver lost consciousness, they were required to sit out for seven days.

In his first race on an oval, Parker Johnstone won the pole with a speed of 230.458 mph. It was Johnstone's first pole, the first pole for Honda engines in Indy car, and the first for Firestone tires since 1974. Teo Fabi was second fastest at 228.526 mph. Michael Andretti completed the front row with a speed of 228.413 mph.

On Saturday, the International Race of Champions competed at Michigan. Al Unser Jr. won the 100 mile race. Unser and fourth-place finisher Scott Pruett were the only two drivers to compete in IROC and the Michigan 500.

== Qualifying ==
July 30, 1995 - Qualifying Speeds
| Rank | Driver | Time | Leader | Speed (mph) | Team |
|---|---|---|---|---|---|
| 1 | (United States) Parker Johnstone | 31.242 | — | 230.458 | Comptech Racing |
| 2 | (Italy) Teo Fabi | 31.506 | +0.264 | 228.526 | Forsythe Racing |
| 3 | (United States) Michael Andretti W | 31.522 | +0.280 | 228.413 | Newman-Haas Racing |
| 4 | (Canada) Jacques Villeneuve | 31.546 | +0.304 | 228.239 | Team Green |
| 5 | (United States) Jimmy Vasser | 31.582 | +0.340 | 227.982 | Chip Ganassi Racing |
| 6 | (Brazil) Maurício Gugelmin | 31.601 | +0.359 | 227.839 | PacWest Racing |
| 7 | (United States) Bryan Herta | 31.767 | +0.525 | 226.652 | Chip Ganassi Racing |
| 8 | (Canada) Paul Tracy | 31.782 | +0.540 | 226.540 | Newman-Haas Racing |
| 9 | (United States) Danny Sullivan W | 31.896 | +0.654 | 225.732 | PacWest Racing |
| 10 | (Brazil) André Ribeiro R | 31.898 | +0.656 | 225.722 | Tasman Motorsports |
| 11 | (Mexico) Adrian Fernández | 31.918 | +0.676 | 225.579 | Galles Racing |
| 12 | (United States) Scott Pruett | 32.023 | +0.781 | 224.841 | Patrick Racing |
| 13 | (United States) Al Unser Jr. W | 32.100 | +0.858 | 224.296 | Team Penske |
| 14 | (Brazil) Raul Boesel | 32.104 | +0.862 | 224.266 | Rahal-Hogan Racing |
| 15 | (Brazil) Gil de Ferran R | 32.173 | +0.931 | 223.787 | Hall Racing |
| 16 | (United States) Bobby Rahal | 32.180 | +0.938 | 223.734 | Rahal-Hogan Racing |
| 17 | (Brazil) Emerson Fittipaldi W | 32.198 | +0.956 | 223.618 | Team Penske |
| 18 | (United States) Eddie Cheever | 32.208 | +0.966 | 223.546 | A. J. Foyt Enterprises |
| 19 | (Mexico) Carlos Guerrero R | 32.218 | +0.976 | 223.480 | Dick Simon Racing |
| 20 | (United States) Buddy Lazier | 32.610 | +1.368 | 220.783 | Payton-Coyne Racing |
| 21 | (Sweden) Stefan Johansson | 32.692 | +1.720 | 220.238 | Bettenhausen Racing |
| 22 | (United States) Lyn St. James | 32.750 | +1.508 | 219.847 | Dick Simon Racing |
| 23 | (Chile) Eliseo Salazar R | 32.846 | +1.604 | 219.201 | Dick Simon Racing |
| 24 | (Italy) Alessandro Zampedri | 32.998 | +1.756 | 218.197 | Payton-Coyne Racing |
| 25 | (Brazil) Christian Fittipaldi R | 33.049 | +1.807 | 224.649 | Walker Racing |
| 26 | (Japan) Hiro Matsushita | 33.990 | +2.748 | 218.245 | Arciero-Wells Racing |

- Robby Gordon crashed during practice and was not cleared to participate in the rest of the weekend.

== Race ==
An estimated 75,000 spectators were on hand for the Marlboro 500.

Parker Johnstone brought the field slowly to the green flag and the start was waved off by CART officials. The field was not aligned well for the second time and the start was waved off again. When the race began, Johnstone established himself as the fastest car.

The first caution of the day came out on lap six when rookie Carlos Guerrero crashed in turn four. When the race resumed, Johnstone maintained his lead. Outside of five laps during pit stop cycles, Johnstone led 52 of the first 57 laps.

Johnstone's attempt to get his first win was ended while leading on lap 58 by a bad wheel bearing. He returned to the track 28 laps behind the leaders and retired for good after brake failure after breaking a right-rear upright.

Johnstone's problems gave the lead to his teammate Andre Ribeiro. With the exception of green flag pit stops, Ribeiro led 68 of the next 72 laps. While leading on lap 129, Ribeiro was sidelined by electrical problems.

After the departure of Johnstone and Ribeiro, Al Unser Jr. and Scott Pruett established themselves as the two fastest cars. Unser led for a total of 66 laps.

On lap 194, Lyn St. James blew an engine and crashed in turn two. Danny Sullivan slid in the oil and both cars crashed into the wall. Sullivan suffered a broken pelvis and was airlifted to a local hospital. The race was ultimately, Sullivan's last career Indy car race.

While leading on lap 230, Unser was forced to make a pit stop under green because of a blistered right-rear tire. That allowed Scott Pruett to re-take the lead. It appeared Pruett would take an easy victory with a 28 second over Unser.

With 13 laps remaining, Alessandro Zampedri crashed in turn four and brought out the caution flag. That allowed Unser to catch up to Pruett for a final five-lap run to the finish.

As the cars approached the final lap, Unser pulled to the outside and completed the pass on Pruett entering turn one. Down the backstretch, Pruett followed the draft of Unser and drove deep into turn three, pulling to the outside of Unser. The two cars came off turn four side-by-side before Pruett pulled ahead approaching the checkered flag.

Pruett won by 0.056 seconds, the second closest margin of victory at a 500 mile Indy car race behind the 1992 Indianapolis 500. It was his first victory in 75 starts. It was the first win for Firestone in Indycar racing since 1974. It was also Patrick Racings first IndyCar victory since the 1989 Bosch Spark Plug Grand Prix at Nazareth Speedway with their former driver Emerson Fittipaldi.

== Box score ==
| Pos | No | Driver | Team | Chassis | Engine | Tire | Laps | Time/retired | Led | Grid | Points |
|---|---|---|---|---|---|---|---|---|---|---|---|
| 1 | 20 | (United States) Scott Pruett | Patrick Racing | Lola T95/00 | Ford-Cosworth XB | F | 250 | 3:07:52 | 58 | 12 | 20 |
| 2 | 1 | (United States) Al Unser Jr. W | Marlboro Team Penske | Penske PC-24 | Mercedes-Benz | G | 250 | +0.56 secs | 66 | 13 | 16 |
| 3 | 10 | (Mexico) Adrián Fernández | Galles Racing | Lola T95/00 | Mercedes-Benz | G | 249 | +1 Lap | 0 | 11 | 14 |
| 4 | 33 | (Italy) Teo Fabi | Forsythe Racing | Reynard 95I | Ford-Cosworth XB | G | 247 | +3 Laps | 1 | 2 | 12 |
| 5 | 2 | (Brazil) Emerson Fittipaldi W | Marlboro Team Penske | Penske PC-24 | Mercedes-Benz | G | 245 | +5 Laps | 0 | 17 | 10 |
| 6 | 16 | (Sweden) Stefan Johansson | Bettenhausen Racing | Penske PC-23 | Mercedes-Benz | G | 244 | +6 Laps | 0 | 21 | 8 |
| 7 | 12 | (United States) Jimmy Vasser | Chip Ganassi Racing | Reynard 95I | Ford-Cosworth XB | G | 241 | +9 Laps | 0 | 5 | 6 |
| 8 | 9 | (United States) Bobby Rahal | Rahal-Hogan Racing | Lola T95/00 | Mercedes-Benz | G | 240 | +10 Laps | 0 | 16 | 5 |
| 9 | 15 | (Brazil) Christian Fittipaldi R | Walker Racing | Reynard 95I | Ford-Cosworth XB | G | 239 | +11 Laps | 0 | 25 | 4 |
| 10 | 27 | (Canada) Jacques Villeneuve | Team Green | Reynard 95I | Ford-Cosworth XB | G | 235 | +15 Laps | 0 | 4 | 3 |
| 11 | 18 | (Brazil) Maurício Gugelmin | PacWest Racing | Reynard 95I | Ford-Cosworth XB | G | 232 | +18 Laps | 2 | 6 | 2 |
| 12 | 8 | (Brazil) Gil de Ferran R | Hall Racing | Reynard 95I | Mercedes-Benz | G | 226 | +24 Laps | 0 | 15 | 1 |
| 13 | 34 | (Italy) Alessandro Zampedri | Payton-Coyne Racing | Lola T94/00 | Ford-Cosworth XB | F | 225 | Contact | 0 | 24 | — |
| 14 | 19 | (United States) Buddy Lazier | Payton-Coyne Racing | Lola T94/00 | Ford-Cosworth XB | F | 223 | +27 Laps | 0 | 20 | — |
| 15 | 4 | (United States) Bryan Herta | Chip Ganassi Racing | Reynard 95I | Ford-Cosworth XB | G | 193 | Contact | 0 | 7 | — |
| 16 | 17 | (United States) Danny Sullivan W | PacWest Racing | Reynard 95I | Ford-Cosworth XB | G | 189 | Contact | 0 | 9 | — |
| 17 | 90 | (United States) Lyn St. James | Dick Simon Racing | Lola T95/00 | Ford-Cosworth XB | G | 188 | Contact | 0 | 22 | — |
| 18 | 7 | (Chile) Eliseo Salazar R | Dick Simon Racing | Lola T95/00 | Ford-Cosworth XB | G | 175 | Engine | 0 | 23 | — |
| 19 | 14 | (United States) Eddie Cheever | A. J. Foyt Enterprises | Lola T95/00 | Ford-Cosworth XB | G | 163 | Transmission | 2 | 18 | — |
| 20 | 25 | (Japan) Hiro Matsushita | Arciero-Wells Racing | Reynard 94I | Ford-Cosworth XB | F | 139 | Contact | 0 | 26 | — |
| 21 | 31 | (Brazil) André Ribeiro R | Tasman Motorsports | Reynard 95I | Honda | F | 130 | Electrical | 68 | 10 | 1^{1} |
| 22 | 49 | (United States) Parker Johnstone | Comptech Racing | Reynard 95I | Honda | F | 100 | Brakes | 52 | 1 | 1^{2} |
| 23 | 3 | (Canada) Paul Tracy | Newman-Haas Racing | Lola T95/00 | Ford-Cosworth XB | G | 91 | Engine | 1 | 8 | — |
| 24 | 11 | (Brazil) Raul Boesel | Rahal-Hogan Racing | Lola T95/00 | Mercedes-Benz | G | 57 | Engine | 0 | 14 | — |
| 25 | 6 | (United States) Michael Andretti W | Newman-Haas Racing | Lola T95/00 | Ford-Cosworth XB | G | 40 | Electrical | 0 | 3 | — |
| 26 | 22 | (Mexico) Carlos Guerrero R | Dick Simon Racing | Lola T95/00 | Ford-Cosworth XB | G | 5 | Contact | 0 | 19 | — |
| 27 | 5 | (United States) Robby Gordon | Walker Racing | Reynard 95I | Ford-Cosworth XB | G | 0 | Withdrawn, not medically cleared | 0 | 27 | — |

Notes

- ^{1}– Includes one bonus point for leading the most laps.
- ^{2}– Includes one bonus point for being the fastest qualifier.

R = Series rookie
W = Former Marlboro 500 winner

Tires:

- G = Goodyear
- F = Firestone

== Broadcasting ==
The Michigan 500 was broadcast live on television by ABC. Paul Page was the lead announcer and was joined by Bobby Unser and Sam Posey as color commentators.

Nielsen ratings stated that the 1995 Michigan 500 attracted the largest television audience for an IndyCar race that year behind the Indianapolis 500.

== Race Statistics ==
- Lead changes: 18 among 8 drivers
- Average Speed: 159.676 mph

Lap Leaders
| Laps | Leader |
|---|---|
| 1-45 | Parker Johnstone |
| 46 | André Ribeiro |
| 47 | Paul Tracy |
| 48 | Teo Fabi |
| 49-50 | Eddie Cheever |
| 51-57 | Parker Johnstone |
| 58-88 | André Ribeiro |
| 89-90 | Scott Pruett |
| 91-92 | Maurício Gugelmin |
| 93-128 | André Ribeiro |
| 129-131 | Scott Pruett |
| 132-152 | Al Unser Jr. |
| 153-154 | Scott Pruett |
| 155-176 | Al Unser Jr. |
| 177-188 | Scott Pruett |
| 189 | Al Unser Jr. |
| 190-207 | Scott Pruett |
| 208-229 | Al Unser Jr. |
| 230-250 | Scott Pruett |

Total Laps Led
| Driver | Total Laps |
|---|---|
| Andre Ribero | 68 |
| Al Unser Jr. | 66 |
| Scott Pruett | 58 |
| Parker Johnstone | 52 |
| Mauricio Gugelmin | 2 |
| Eddie Cheever | 2 |
| Teo Fabi | 1 |
| Paul Tracy | 2 |

Cautions: 6 for 51 laps
| Laps | Reason |
|---|---|
| 1-2 | Aborted start |
| 7-15 | Guerrero crash |
| 152-158 | Matsushita crash |
| 194-208 | Herta, Sullivan, St. James crash |
| 238-245 | Zampedri crash |

== Standings after the race ==
Drivers' Championship standings

| Rank | +/– | Driver | Points |
|---|---|---|---|
| 1 | | (Canada) Jacques Villeneuve | 140 |
| 2 | | (United States) Bobby Rahal | 109 |
| 3 | | (United States) Robby Gordon | 98 |
| 3 | 2 | (United States) Al Unser Jr. | 98 |
| 5 | 1 | (United States) Michael Andretti | 94 |

- Note: Only the top five positions are included for the standings.

| Previous race: 1995 Budweiser Grand Prix of Cleveland | PPG Indy Car World Series; 1995 season | Next race: 1995 Miller Genuine Draft 200 |
| Previous race: 1994 Marlboro 500 | Marlboro 500 | Next race: 1996 U.S. 500 |
