= IndyCar Rookie of the Year =

The IndyCar Rookie of the Year Award is presented to the first-year driver that has the best season in a IndyCar Series season.

The following lists compiling all the winners of the Rookie of the Year Award in open wheel American Championship Car Racing from 1946 season to the present day. Before the creation of Championship Auto Racing Teams the prize is not officially awarded. So all of the AAA and USAC winners of the Rookie of the Year award is not officially recognized.

As of the 2022 IndyCar Series season, a driver is a Rookie Driver in the IndyCar Series if the driver has:
A) not participated in more than four (4) IndyCar Series races in a Racing Season or
B) participated in less than eight (8) IndyCar Series races in his/her career.

The list of "Indy car", "Champ Car", or "IndyCar" rookies under the following auspices:

- American Automobile Association Contest Board (1946–1955)
- United States Automobile Club (1956–1980)
- Championship Auto Racing Teams (1979–2007)
- Indy Racing League/IndyCar Series (1997–present)

== Sanctioning bodies ==
The AAA Contest Board began sanctioning races as early as 1904. In the early years of the sport, only two seasons (1905 and 1916) an official national championship was recognized and awarded. The 1946 season is a source of a statistical anomaly. The AAA Contest Board included a substantial number of "Big Car" races in the national championship for 1946, swelling the season to 77 events (6 Champ Car races and 71 Big Car races). Some later texts chose to dismiss the 71 Big Car races from record, but reliable records and historians contend that the season should be regarded as the full 77-race schedule.
Officially, Jim Trueman Rookie of the Year Award named after the late founder of the two-time champion TrueSports Racing Team, it was presented from 1979 Season to 2007 Season to the rookie who accumulates the most Champ Car Championship Series points among first year drivers.

== Rookie of the Year winners ==
=== AAA and USAC Rookie of the Year winners ===
AAA National Motor Car Championship
Year	Rookie of the Year winners	Driver standings	Wins	Team
1946	(United States) Jimmy Jackson	4		Jimmy Jackson Racing
1947	(United States) Bill Holland	2	2	Fred Peters Racing
1948	(United States) Mack Hellings	8		Tommy Lee Racing
1949	(United States) Jimmy Davies	17	1	Pat Clancy Racing
1950	(United States) Walt Faulkner	2	1	J.C. Agajanian Racing
1951	(United States) Mike Nazaruk	5		Jim Robbins Racing, Lou & Bruce Bromme Racing
1952	(United States) Jimmy Reece	9		John Zink Racing
1953	(United States) Ernie McCoy	16		H.A. Chapman Racing
1954	(United States) Larry Crockett	11		Federal Engineering
1955	(United States) George Amick	9		Lindsey Hopkins Racing
USAC National Championship
Year	Rookie of the Year winners	Driver standings	Wins	Team
1956	(United States) Jud Larson	22	1	John Zink Racing
1957	(United States) A. J. Foyt	26		John Wills Racing
1958	(United States) Joe Barzda	18		Joe Barzda Racing
1959	(United States) Jim Hurtubise	21	1	Racing Associates
1960	(United States) Parnelli Jones	18		D.A. Caruthers Racing
1961	(United States) Bobby Marshman	8		Walter Meskowski Racing
1962	(United States) Johnny Rutherford	25		Ollie Prather Racing
1963	(United Kingdom) Jim Clark	6	1	Team Lotus
1964	(United States) Mario Andretti	11		Dean Van Lines Racing
1965	(United States) Carl Williams	23		
1966	(United States) Al Smith	16		Federal Automotive Associates
1967	(United States) Jim Malloy	27		Jim Robbins Racing
1968	(United States) Sonny Ates	24		Boyce Holt Racing, Joe Barzda Racing, Federal Automotive Associates
1969	(United States) Steve Krisiloff	24		Shelby-Dowd Racing
1970	(United States) Dick Simon	10		Racing International
1971	(Canada) George Eaton	24		Fejer Brothers Racing
1972	(United States) Mike Hiss	6		Page Racing Enterprises
1973	(United States) Tom Sneva	31		
1974	(United States) Pancho Carter	11		Bob Fletcher Racing
1975	(United States) Spike Gehlhausen	24		Carl Gehlhausen Racing
1976	(United States) Rick Mears	16		Art Sugai Racing
1977	(United States) Danny Ongais	12	1	Interscope Racing
1978	(United States) Tom Bagley	11		Leader Card Racers
1979	(United States) Howdy Holmes	12		AMI Racing
1980	(United States) Gordon Smiley	18		Patrick Racing

=== CART Jim Trueman Rookie of the Year winners ===
The Rookie of the Year award in CART was named in the honor of Jim Trueman.

Season	Driver	Driver standings	Wins	Team	Chassis	Engine	Tyres
1979	(United States) Bill Alsup	15		WASP Racing	McLaren M16C/D	Offenhauser L4t 159 ci	Goodyear
1980	(Australia) Dennis Firestone	12		Rhoades Competition	Penske	Cosworth DFX	Goodyear
1981	(United States) Bob Lazier	9		Bob Fletcher Racing	Penske (1–6); March 81C (7–11)	Cosworth DFX	Goodyear
1982	(United States) Bobby Rahal	2	2	Truesports	March 82C	Cosworth DFX	Goodyear
1983	(Italy) Teo Fabi	2	4	Forsythe Racing	March 83C	Cosworth DFX	Goodyear
1984	(Colombia) Roberto Guerrero	11		Bignotti-Cotter Racing	March 84C	Cosworth DFX	Goodyear
1985	(Netherlands) Arie Luyendyk	18		Provimi Racing	Lola T900	Cosworth DFX	Goodyear
1986	(Germany) Dominic Dobson	30		Leader Cards Racing	March 86C	Cosworth DFX	Goodyear
1987	(Italy) Fabrizio Barbazza	12		Arciero Racing	March 87C	Cosworth DFX	Goodyear
1988	(Canada) John Jones	11		Arciero Racing	March 88C	Cosworth DFX	Goodyear
1989	(Mexico) Bernard Jourdain	20		Andale Racing	Lola	Cosworth DFX	Goodyear
1990	(United States) Eddie Cheever	9		Chip Ganassi Racing	Penske PC-18	Chevrolet A	Goodyear
1991	(United States) Jeff Andretti	15		Bayside Disposal Racing	Lola	Cosworth DFX	Goodyear
1992	(Sweden) Stefan Johansson	14		Bettenhausen Racing	Penske PC-20	Chevrolet A	Goodyear
1993	(United Kingdom) Nigel Mansell	Champion	5	Newman/Haas Racing	Lola T93/00	Ford XB	Goodyear
1994	(Canada) Jacques Villeneuve	6	1	Forsythe Racing	Reynard 94i	Ford XB	Goodyear
1995	(Brazil) Gil de Ferran	14	1	Jim Hall Racing	Reynard 95i	Mercedes-Benz IC108	Goodyear
1996	(Italy) Alex Zanardi	3	3	Chip Ganassi Racing	Reynard 96i	Honda HRH	Firestone
1997	(Canada) Patrick Carpentier	17		Bettenhausen Racing	Reynard 97i	Mercedes-Benz IC108D	Goodyear
1998	(Brazil) Tony Kanaan	9		Tasman Motorsports	Reynard 98i	Honda HRK	Firestone
1999	(Colombia) Juan Pablo Montoya	Champion	7	Chip Ganassi Racing	Reynard 99i	Honda HRS	Firestone
2000	(Sweden) Kenny Bräck	4		Team Rahal	Reynard 2Ki	Ford Cosworth XF	Firestone
2001	(New Zealand) Scott Dixon	8	1	PacWest Racing	Reynard 01i	Toyota RV8F	Firestone
2002	(Mexico) Mario Domínguez	18	1	Herdez Competition	Lola B02/00	Ford Cosworth XF	Bridgestone
2003	(France) Sébastien Bourdais	4	3	Newman/Haas Racing	Lola B02/00	Ford Cosworth XFE	Bridgestone
2004	(United States) A. J. Allmendinger	6		RuSPORT	Lola B02/00	Ford Cosworth XFE	Bridgestone
2005	(Germany) Timo Glock	8		Rocketsports Racing	Lola B02/00	Ford Cosworth XFE	Bridgestone
2006	(Australia) Will Power	6		Team Australia	Lola B02/00	Ford Cosworth XFE	Bridgestone
2007	(Netherlands) Robert Doornbos	3	2	Minardi Team USA	Panoz DP01	Cosworth XFE	Bridgestone

=== IndyCar Series Rookie of the Year winners ===
As of 2018 IndyCar Series season The Rookie of the Year Award is presented to the top-finishing rookie in the IndyCar Series Drivers point standings. Winner also receives a $50,000 bonus. The Rookie of the Year Award is based on points for the IndyCar Series Drivers' Championship earned at each event.

Season	Driver	Driver standings	Wins	Team	Chassis	Engine	Tyres
1996–97	(United States) Jim Guthrie	12	1	Blueprint Racing	Lola T93/00; Dallara IR7	Menard V6; Buick V6; Oldsmobile Aurora V8	Firestone
1998	(United States) Robby Unser	16		Cheever Racing	G-Force GF01B; Dallara IR8	Oldsmobile Aurora V8	Goodyear
1999	(United States) Scott Harrington	14		Harrington Motorsports	Dallara IR9	Infiniti VRH35ADE V8; Oldsmobile Aurora V8	Firestone
2000	(Brazil) Airton Daré	16		TeamXtreme	G-Force GF05	Oldsmobile Aurora V8	Firestone
2001	(Brazil) Felipe Giaffone	6		Treadway Racing	G-Force GF05B	Oldsmobile Aurora V8	Firestone
2002	(France) Laurent Rédon	12		Conquest Racing	Dallara IR-02	Infiniti VRH35ADE V8	Firestone
2003	(United Kingdom) Dan Wheldon	11		Andretti Green Racing	Dallara IR-03	Honda HI3R V8	Firestone
2004	(Japan) Kosuke Matsuura	14		Fernández Racing	G-Force GF09B	Honda HI4R V8	Firestone
2005	(United States) Danica Patrick	12		Rahal Letterman Racing	Panoz GF09C	Honda HI5R V8	Firestone
2006	(United States) Marco Andretti	7	1	Andretti Green Racing	Dallara IR-05	Honda HI6R V8	Firestone
2007	(United States) Ryan Hunter-Reay	19		Rahal Letterman Racing	Dallara IR-05	Honda HI7R V8	Firestone
2008	(Japan) Hideki Mutoh	10		Andretti Green Racing	Dallara IR-05	Honda HI7R V8	Firestone
2009	(Brazil) Raphael Matos	13		Luczo-Dragon Racing	Dallara IR-05	Honda HI7R V8	Firestone
2010	(United Kingdom) Alex Lloyd	16		Dale Coyne Racing	Dallara IR-05	Honda HI7R V8	Firestone
2011	(Canada) James Hinchcliffe	12		Newman/Haas Racing	Dallara IR-05	Honda HI7R V8	Firestone
2012	(France) Simon Pagenaud	5		Sam Schmidt Motorsports	Dallara DW12	Honda HI12TT V6t	Firestone
2013	(France) Tristan Vautier	20		Sam Schmidt Motorsports	Dallara DW12	Honda HI13TT V6t	Firestone
2014	(Colombia) Carlos Muñoz	8		Andretti Autosport	Dallara DW12	Honda HI14TT V6t	Firestone
2015	(Colombia) Gabby Chaves	15		Bryan Herta Autosport	Dallara DW12	Honda HI15TT V6t	Firestone
2016	(United States) Alexander Rossi	11	1	Bryan Herta Autosport	Dallara DW12	Honda HI16TT V6t	Firestone
2017	(United Kingdom) Ed Jones	14		Dale Coyne Racing	Dallara DW12	Honda HI17TT V6t	Firestone
2018	(Canada) Robert Wickens	11		Schmidt Peterson Motorsports	Dallara IR-18	Honda HI18TT V6t	Firestone
2019	(Sweden) Felix Rosenqvist	6		Chip Ganassi Racing	Dallara IR-18	Honda HI19TT V6t	Firestone
2020	(Netherlands) Rinus VeeKay	14		Ed Carpenter Racing	Dallara IR-18	Chevrolet IndyCar V6t	Firestone
2021	(New Zealand) Scott McLaughlin	14		Team Penske	Dallara IR-18	Chevrolet IndyCar V6t	Firestone
2022	(Denmark) Christian Lundgaard	14		Rahal Letterman Lanigan Racing	Dallara IR-18	Honda HI22TT V6t	Firestone
2023	(New Zealand) Marcus Armstrong	20		Chip Ganassi Racing	Dallara IR-18	Honda HI23TT V6t	Firestone
2024	(Sweden) Linus Lundqvist	16		Chip Ganassi Racing	Dallara IR-18	Honda HI24TT V6t	Firestone
2025	(United Kingdom) Louis Foster	23		Rahal Letterman Lanigan Racing	Dallara IR-18	Honda HI25TT V6t	Firestone
2026	(Norway) Dennis Hauger	22		Dale Coyne Racing	Dallara IR-18	Honda HI26TT V6t	Firestone

=== Notes ===
- Due to sanctioning body splits in the sport of American Open Wheel racing from 1979 to 2007, several years saw two separate Rookie of the Year Award winners for separately sanctioned championship circuits.
- Because of the sanctioning body split, Indy Racing League officials in 2003 did not consider Scott Dixon (Champion), Tony Kanaan (4th), or Toranosuke Takagi (10th) as rookies. However, by 2007, with a new Champ Car formula and elimination of ovals, League officials declared subsequent 2006 and 2007 rookie candidates rookies because they lacked oval experience.
- In 2008 IndyCar Season Will Power was considered a rookie. That year he won the Toyota Grand Prix of Long Beach, but that race was run under Champ Car rules and he become the last ever winner of a Champ Car-style race. Power's rookie year in Champ Car was 2006 as he won the Rookie of the Year award that season, so in 2008 Toyota Grand Prix of Long Beach Power did not have a rookie status for that race.

== IndyCar Rookie winners ==
#	Season	Date	Sanction	Track / Race	No.	Winning driver	Entrant / Team	Chassis	Engine	Tire	Grid	Laps Led
1	1913	May 30	AAA	Indianapolis 500 (O)	16	(France) Jules Goux	Peugeot Auto Racing	Peugeot L76	Peugeot I4 448 ci	Firestone	7	138
2	1914	May 30	AAA	Indianapolis 500 (O)	16	(France) René Thomas	Louis Delâge	Delage Type R	Delage	Palmer	15	102
3	1926	May 30	AAA	Indianapolis 500 (O)	15	(United States) Frank Lockhart	Pete Kreis	1926 Miller 91	Miller SC	Firestone	20	95
4	1927	May 30	AAA	Indianapolis 500 (O)	32	(United States) George Souders	Bill White	Duesenberg	Duesenberg SC 90 ci	Firestone	22	51
5	1947	June 8	AAA	Milwaukee Mile (DO)	8	(United States) Bill Holland	Fred Peters	1939 Wetteroth	Offenhauser L4 270 ci	Firestone	Pole	71
6	1947	June 22	AAA	Langhorne Speedway (DO)	8	(United States) Bill Holland (2)	Fred Peters	1939 Wetteroth	Offenhauser L4 270 ci	Firestone	7	31
7	1948	August 15	AAA	Milwaukee Mile (DO)	98	(United States) Johnny Mantz	J. C. Agajanian	1948 Kurtis 2000	Offenhauser L4 270 ci	Firestone	3	1
8	1948	October 10	AAA	DuQuoin (DO)	7	(United States) Johnnie Parsons	Kurtis Kraft Racing	1948 Kurtis 1000	Offenhauser L4 270 ci	Firestone	7	77
9	1949	November 6	AAA	Del Mar Fairgrounds (DO)	57	(United States) Jimmy Davies	Pat Clancy	Ewing	Offenhauser L4 270 ci	Firestone	Pole	100
10	1950	August 27	AAA	Milwaukee Mile (DO)	98	(United States) Walt Faulkner	J. C. Agajanian	1948 Kurtis 2000	Offenhauser L4 270 ci	Firestone	8	108
11	1956	October 21	USAC	Sacramento (DO)	8	(United States) Jud Larson	John Zink Racing	1955 Watson D	Offenhauser L4 270 ci	Firestone	Pole	88
12	1959	October 25	USAC	Sacramento (DO)	3	(United States) Jim Hurtubise	Racing Associates	1955 Kuzma D	Offenhauser L4 252 ci	Firestone	11	57
13	1963	August 18	USAC	Milwaukee Mile (O)	92	(United Kingdom) Jim Clark	Team Lotus	Lotus 29	Ford Indy V8 255 ci	Dunlop	Pole	200
14	1966	May 30	USAC	Indianapolis 500 (O)	24	(United Kingdom) Graham Hill	Mecom Racing Team	Lola T90	Ford Indy V8 255 ci	Firestone	15	10
15	1977	July 17	USAC	Michigan (O)	25	(United States) Danny Ongais	Interscope Racing	Parnelli VPJ-6B	Cosworth DFX V8t	Goodyear	4	24
16	1982	July 4	CART	Cleveland (A)	19	(United States) Bobby Rahal	Truesports	March 82C	Cosworth DFX V8t	Goodyear	2	26
17	1982	September 19	CART	Road America (R)	32	(Mexico) Héctor Rebaque	Forsythe Racing	March 82C	Cosworth DFX V8t	Goodyear	9	1
18	1982	September 26	CART	Michigan (O)	19	(United States) Bobby Rahal (2)	Truesports	March 82C	Cosworth DFX V8t	Goodyear	5	29
19	1983	July 17	CART	Michigan 500 (O)	12	(United States) John Paul Jr.	VDS Racing	Penske PC-10	Cosworth DFX V8t	Goodyear	2	26
20	1983	August 14	CART	Pocono 500 (O)	33	(Italy) Teo Fabi	Forsythe Racing	March 83C	Cosworth DFX V8t	Goodyear	2	116
21	1983	September 11	CART	Mid-Ohio (R)	33	(Italy) Teo Fabi (2)	Forsythe Racing	March 83C	Cosworth DFX V8t	Goodyear	2	40
22	1983	October 23	CART	Laguna Seca Raceway (R)	33	(Italy) Teo Fabi (3)	Forsythe Racing	March 83C	Cosworth DFX V8t	Goodyear	Pole	95
23	1983	October 29	CART	Phoenix (O)	33	(Italy) Teo Fabi (4)	Forsythe Racing	March 83C	Cosworth DFX V8t	Goodyear	Pole	138
24	1993	March 21	CART	Gold Coast Indy 300 (S)	5	(United Kingdom) Nigel Mansell	Newman/Haas Racing	Lola T93/00	Ford XB V8t	Goodyear	Pole	32
25	1993	June 6	CART	Milwaukee Mile (O)	5	(United Kingdom) Nigel Mansell (2)	Newman/Haas Racing	Lola T93/00	Ford XB V8t	Goodyear	7	19
26	1993	August 1	CART	Michigan 500 (O)	5	(United Kingdom) Nigel Mansell (3)	Newman/Haas Racing	Lola T93/00	Ford XB V8t	Goodyear	2	222
27	1993	August 8	CART	New Hampshire (O)	5	(United Kingdom) Nigel Mansell (4)	Newman/Haas Racing	Lola T93/00	Ford XB V8t	Goodyear	2	222
28	1993	September 19	CART	Nazareth Speedway (O)	5	(United Kingdom) Nigel Mansell (5)	Newman/Haas Racing	Lola T93/00	Ford XB V8t	Goodyear	Pole	155
29	1994	September 11	CART	Road America (R)	12	(Canada) Jacques Villeneuve	Forsythe/Green Racing	Reynard 94i	Ford XB V8t	Goodyear	2	15
30	1995	August 20	CART	New Hampshire (O)	31	(Brazil) André Ribeiro	Tasman Motorsports	Reynard 95i	Honda HRH V8t	Firestone	Pole	96
31	1995	September 10	CART	Laguna Seca Raceway (R)	8	(Brazil) Gil de Ferran	Jim Hall Racing	Reynard 95i	Mercedes-Benz IC108B V8t	Goodyear	3	54
32	1996	January 27	IRL	Walt Disney World (O)	12	(United States) Buzz Calkins	Bradley Motorsports	Reynard 95i	Ford XB V8t	Firestone	5	130
33	1996	June 23	CART	Grand Prix of Portland (R)	4	(Italy) Alex Zanardi	Chip Ganassi Racing	Reynard 96i	Honda HRH V8t	Firestone	Pole	95
34	1996	August 11	CART	Mid-Ohio (R)	4	(Italy) Alex Zanardi (2)	Chip Ganassi Racing	Reynard 96i	Honda HRH V8t	Firestone	Pole	79
35	1996	September 8	CART	Laguna Seca Raceway (R)	4	(Italy) Alex Zanardi (3)	Chip Ganassi Racing	Reynard 96i	Honda HRH V8t	Firestone	Pole	41
36	1997	March 23	IRL	Phoenix (O)	27	(United States) Jim Guthrie	Blueprint Racing	Dallara IR7	Oldsmobile Aurora V8	Firestone	2	74
37	1999	April 18	CART	Long Beach (S)	4	(Colombia) Juan Montoya	Chip Ganassi Racing	Reynard 99i	Honda HRS V8t	Firestone	5	40
38	1999	May 2	CART	Nazareth Speedway (O)	4	(Colombia) Juan Montoya (2)	Chip Ganassi Racing	Reynard 99i	Honda HRS V8t	Firestone	Pole	210
39	1999	May 15	CART	Rio 200 (O)	4	(Colombia) Juan Montoya (3)	Chip Ganassi Racing	Reynard 99i	Honda HRS V8t	Firestone	3	93
40	1999	June 27	CART	Cleveland (A)	4	(Colombia) Juan Montoya (4)	Chip Ganassi Racing	Reynard 99i	Honda HRS V8t	Firestone	Pole	76
41	1999	August 15	CART	Mid-Ohio (R)	4	(Colombia) Juan Montoya (5)	Chip Ganassi Racing	Reynard 99i	Honda HRS V8t	Firestone	8	28
42	1999	August 22	CART	Chicago Speedway (O)	4	(Colombia) Juan Montoya (6)	Chip Ganassi Racing	Reynard 99i	Honda HRS V8t	Firestone	10	132
43	1999	September 5	CART	Streets of Vancouver (S)	4	(Colombia) Juan Montoya (7)	Chip Ganassi Racing	Reynard 99i	Honda HRS V8t	Firestone	Pole	73
44	2000	May 28	IRL	Indianapolis 500 (O)	9	(Colombia) Juan Montoya (8)	Chip Ganassi Racing	G-Force GF05	Oldsmobile Aurora V8	Firestone	2	167
45	2001	May 6	CART	Nazareth Speedway (O)	18	(New Zealand) Scott Dixon	PacWest Racing	Reynard 01i	Toyota RV8F V8t	Firestone	23	36
46	2001	May 27	IRL	Indianapolis 500 (O)	68	(Brazil) Hélio Castroneves	Penske Racing	Dallara IR-01	Oldsmobile Aurora V8	Firestone	11	52
47	2001	August 19	CART	Road America (R)	4	(Brazil) Bruno Junqueira	Chip Ganassi Racing	Lola B01/00	Toyota RV8F V8t	Firestone	10	11
48	2002	July 28	IRL	Michigan (O)	9	(South Africa) Tomas Scheckter	Cheever Racing	Dallara IR-02	Infiniti VRH35ADE V8	Firestone	Pole	122
49	2002	October 27	CART	Surfers Paradise (S)	55	(Mexico) Mario Domínguez	HVM Racing	Lola B2/00	Ford XF V8t	Bridgestone	16	4
50	2003	May 5	CART	Brands Hatch (R)	2	(France) Sébastien Bourdais	Newman/Haas Racing	Lola B2/00	Ford XF V8t	Bridgestone	2	95
51	2003	May 11	CART	EuroSpeedway Lausitz (O)	2	(France) Sébastien Bourdais (2)	Newman/Haas Racing	Lola B2/00	Ford XF V8t	Bridgestone	Pole	74
52	2003	July 5	CART	Cleveland (A)	2	(France) Sébastien Bourdais (3)	Newman/Haas Racing	Lola B2/00	Ford XF V8t	Bridgestone	Pole	33
53	2003	October 26	CART	Surfers Paradise (S)	31	(United States) Ryan Hunter-Reay	American Spirit Team Johansson	Reynard 02i	Ford XF V8t	Bridgestone	12	15
54	2006	August 27	IRL	Sonoma Raceway (R)	26	(United States) Marco Andretti	Andretti Green Racing	Dallara IR-05	Honda HI6R V8	Firestone	2	30
55	2007	July 1	CART	Circuit Mont-Tremblant (R)	14	(Netherlands) Robert Doornbos	Minardi Team USA	Panoz DP01	Cosworth XFE V8t	Bridgestone	5	20
56	2007	July 29	CART	San Jose Grand Prix (S)	14	(Netherlands) Robert Doornbos (2)	Minardi Team USA	Panoz DP01	Cosworth XFE V8t	Bridgestone	15	30
57	2008	April 6	IRL	Grand Prix of St. Petersburg (S)	06	(United States) Graham Rahal	Newman/Haas Racing	Dallara IR-05	Honda HI7R V8	Firestone	9	19
58	2008	August 31	IRL	Detroit Grand Prix (S)	02	(United Kingdom) Justin Wilson	Newman/Haas Racing	Dallara IR-05	Honda HI7R V8	Firestone	4	15
59	2014	June 28	IndyCar	Grand Prix of Houston (S)	18	(Colombia) Carlos Huertas	Dale Coyne Racing	Dallara DW12	Honda HI14TT V6t	Firestone	19	7
60	2016	May 29	IndyCar	Indianapolis 500 (O)	98	(United States) Alexander Rossi	Bryan Herta Autosport	Dallara DW12	Honda HI16TT V6t	Firestone	11	14
61	2019	March 24	IndyCar	Circuit of the Americas (R)	88	(United States) Colton Herta	Harding Steinbrenner Racing	Dallara IR-18	Honda HI19TT V6t	Firestone	4	15
62	2019	September 22	IndyCar	Laguna Seca (R)	88	(United States) Colton Herta (2)	Harding Steinbrenner Racing	Dallara IR-18	Honda HI19TT V6t	Firestone	Pole	83

== Drivers Who Won Their First Race With a New Team ==
#	Season	Date	Sanction	Track / Race	No.	Winning driver	Entrant / Team	Chassis	Engine	Tire	Grid	Laps Led
1	1966	May 30	USAC	Indianapolis 500 (O)	24	(United Kingdom) Graham Hill (R)	Mecom Racing Team	Lola T90	Ford Indy V8 255 ci	Firestone	15	10
2	1980	April 13	CART	Ontario Motor Speedway (O)	4	(United States) Johnny Rutherford	Chaparral Racing	Chaparral 2K	Cosworth DFX V8t	Goodyear	Pole	74
3	1991	March 17	CART	Surfers Paradise (S)	4	(United States) John Andretti	Jim Hall Racing	Lola T91/00	Chevrolet 265A V8t	Goodyear	9	4
4	1993	March 21	CART	Surfers Paradise (S)	5	(United Kingdom) Nigel Mansell (R)	Newman/Haas Racing	Lola T93/00	Ford XB V8t	Goodyear	Pole	32
5	1994	March 20	CART	Surfers Paradise (S)	8	(United States) Michael Andretti	Chip Ganassi Racing	Reynard 94i	Ford XB V8t	Goodyear	2	55
6	1996	January 27	IRL	Walt Disney World (O)	12	(United States) Buzz Calkins (R)	Bradley Motorsports	Reynard 95i	Ford XB V8t	Firestone	5	130
7	2001	March 11	CART	Fundidora Park (S)	6	(Brazil) Cristiano da Matta	Newman/Haas Racing	Lola B01/00	Toyota RV8F V8t	Firestone	2	32
8	2001	March 18	IRL	Phoenix International Raceway (O)	4	(United States) Sam Hornish Jr.	Panther Racing	Dallara IR-01	Oldsmobile Aurora V8	Firestone	2	140
9	2003	March 23	CART	St. Petersburg (S)	3	(United States) Paul Tracy	Forsythe Racing	Lola B02/00	Ford XFE V8t	Bridgestone	2	71
10	2004	February 29	IRL	Homestead-Miami Speedway (O)	6	(United States) Sam Hornish Jr. (2)	Penske Racing	Dallara IR-04	Toyota Indy V8	Firestone	7	6
11	2006	March 26	IRL	Homestead-Miami Speedway (O)	10	(United Kingdom) Dan Wheldon	Chip Ganassi Racing	Dallara IR-05	Honda HI6R V8	Firestone	6	8
12	2011	May 29	IndyCar	Indianapolis 500 (O)	98	(United Kingdom) Dan Wheldon (2)	Bryan Herta Autosport	Dallara IR-05	Honda HI7R V8	Firestone	6	1
13	2013	June 1	IndyCar	Detroit Belle Isle Grand Prix (S)	18	(United Kingdom) Mike Conway	Dale Coyne Racing	Dallara DW12	Honda HI12TT V6t	Firestone	17	11
14	2021	April 18	IndyCar	Indy Grand Prix of Alabama (R)	10	(Spain) Álex Palou	Chip Ganassi Racing	Dallara DW12	Honda HI21TT V6t	Firestone	3	56
15	2021	May 30	IndyCar	Indianapolis 500 (O)	06	(Brazil) Hélio Castroneves	Meyer Shank Racing	Dallara DW12	Honda HI21TT V6t	Firestone	8	20

== See also ==
- Indianapolis 500 Rookie of the Year
- List of Indianapolis 500 winners
