= 1995 Champ Car season =

The 1995 Champ Car season may refer to:

- the 1994-95 USAC Championship Car season, which was just one race, the 79th Indianapolis 500
- the 1995 PPG Indy Car World Series, sanctioned by CART, who later became Champ Car
