= 1995 PPG Indy Car World Series =

American motorsport season

1995 CART IndyCar season
- PPG Indy Car World Series
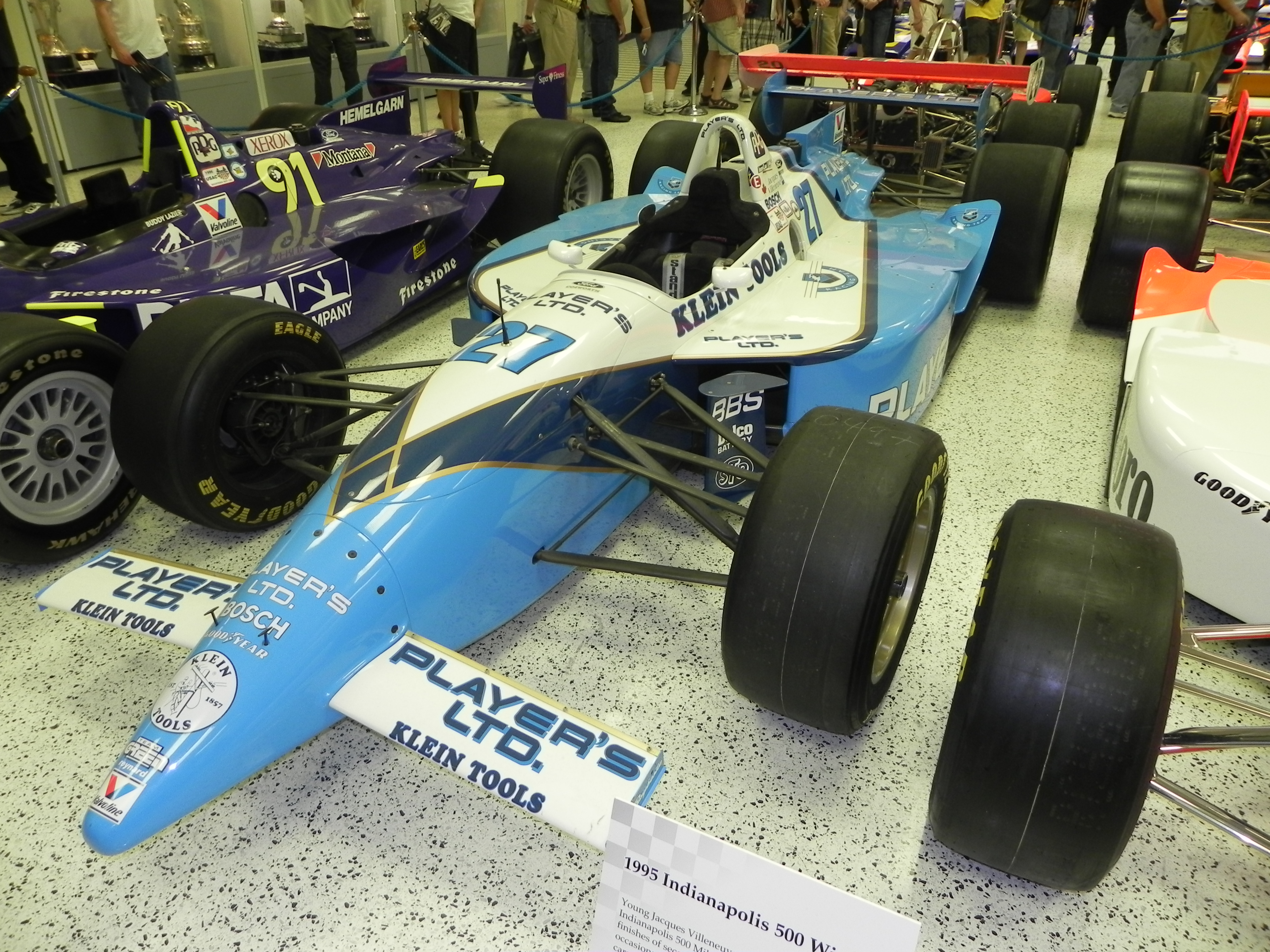

Season
- Races: 17
- Start date: March 5
- End date: September 10

Awards
- Drivers' champion: (Canada) Jacques Villeneuve
- Constructors' Cup: (United Kingdom) Reynard
- Manufacturers' Cup: (United States) Ford XB
- Nations' Cup: United States
- Rookie of the Year: (Brazil) Gil de Ferran
- Indianapolis 500 winner: (Canada) Jacques Villeneuve

The 1995 PPG Indy Car World Series season was the seventeenth in the Championship Auto Racing Teams (CART) era of U.S. American open-wheel car racing. It consisted of 17 races, beginning in Miami, Florida on March 5 and concluding in Monterey, California on September 10. The PPG Indy Car World Series Drivers' Champion and Indianapolis 500 winner was Jacques Villeneuve, and the Rookie of the Year was Gil de Ferran. This was the last season before the formation of the Indy Racing League (IRL) by Indianapolis Motor Speedway president Tony George and the last time the United States Auto Club-sanctioned Indianapolis 500 would appear in the Series, while Villeneuve became the last driver to win both the Indianapolis 500 and the IndyCar drivers' championship in the same season until Dan Wheldon in 2005.

Villeneuve, the 1994 IndyCar Rookie of the Year, won the season opener at Miami, a foreshadowing of things to come for the French-Canadian driver. After Scott Goodyear was penalized, Villeneuve won the 1995 Indianapolis 500, despite also receiving a penalty in the race that put him down two laps. He also won at Road America and Cleveland en route to the 1995 IndyCar Championship and an offer from Frank Williams to drive in Formula One for 1996. Though Team Penske scored five wins (four by 1994 IndyCar champion Al Unser Jr.), they were nowhere near the juggernaut they were in 1994, with a low point being that both their drivers (Unser Jr. and Emerson Fittipaldi) failed to qualify for the Indianapolis 500. The Honda engine that was abandoned at Indianapolis the previous year led most of the Indy 500 in 1995. The Firestone Tire and Rubber Company returned to the series and Indianapolis for the first time since 1974. Danny Sullivan's racing career came to an end after a hard crash at Michigan International Speedway.

== Drivers and teams ==
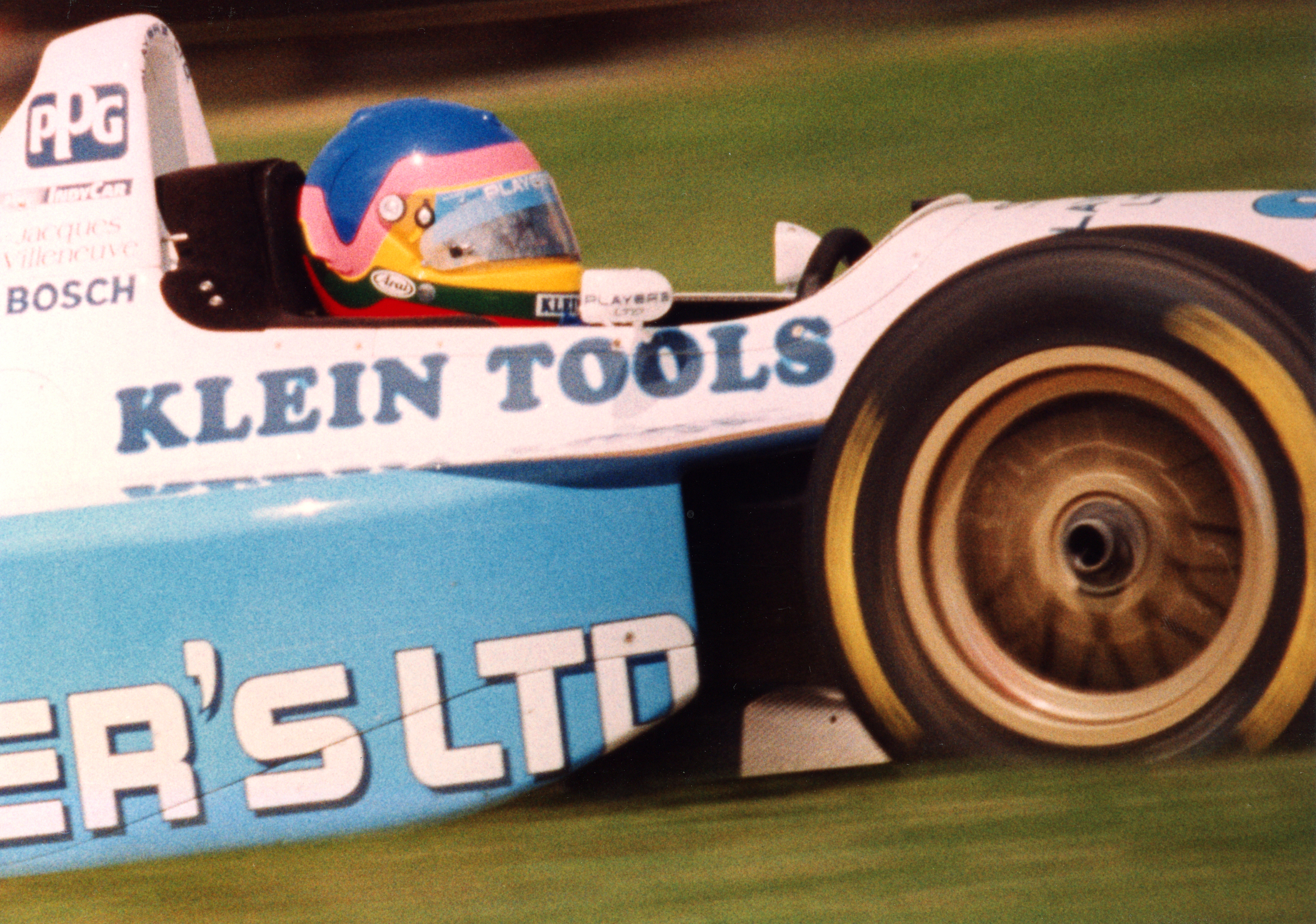
Jacques Villeneuve racing in 1995 at Mid-Ohio Sports Car Course

Several teams went through complete overhauls during the 1994 offseason. At Newman-Haas Racing, Nigel Mansell left IndyCar and returned to Formula One, and Mario Andretti retired. The team signed Michael Andretti for the seat vacated by his father. Canadian Paul Tracy, who had harsh words about Michael Andretti (notably at Toronto) in 1994 while driving for Marlboro Team Penske, became Michael's teammate (and Mansell's replacement) at Newman-Haas when Team Penske went from three cars to two. Gerry Forsythe and Barry Green, owners of Jacques Villeneuve's car in 1994, went their separate ways. Villeneuve stayed with the newly christened Team Green. Rahal-Hogan Racing released Mike Groff and signed Brazilian Raul Boesel and his Duracell sponsorship as a teammate to 1986 Indianapolis 500 winner Bobby Rahal. Chip Ganassi Racing lost both of its drivers from 1994, Michael Andretti and Brazilian Maurício Gugelmin. The team signed Jimmy Vasser from Hayhoe Racing and Bryan Herta from A. J. Foyt Racing. Eddie Cheever replaced Herta at A. J. Foyt Racing. PacWest Racing released both Dominic Dobson and Scott Sharp and signed 1985 Indianapolis 500 winner Danny Sullivan and Maurício Gugelmin, who came over from Ganassi Racing. Walker Racing released Willy T. Ribbs and Mark Smith and signed Brazilian rookie Christian Fittipaldi to team with Robby Gordon. Dick Simon Racing released Raul Boesel and Hiro Matsushita, signed Chilean rookie Eliseo Salazar, and added a second car at Phoenix for the rest of the season, driven primarily by Mexican rookie Carlos Guerrero. Hall Racing released Italian Teo Fabi and signed Brazilian rookie Gil de Ferran. Galles Racing added a second entry for Marco Greco from Long Beach until the end of the season to team with Adrian Fernandez. Payton/Coyne Racing signed Belgian Eric Bachelart as its second driver, teaming with Alessandro Zampedri.

Hayhoe Racing folded, and Jimmy Vasser signed with Chip Ganassi's team. King Racing folded, leaving Canadian Scott Goodyear without a full-time ride. Indy Regency Racing folded and returned to Indy Lights, leaving Dutchman Arie Luyendyk without a full-time ride. Euromotorsport also folded.

=== New teams ===
Tasman Motorsports, which had won the last two Indy Lights championships, moved up from Indy Lights and brought with them one of their Indy Lights drivers, 1994 Indy Lights championship runner-up Brazilian Andre Ribeiro. Patrick Racing returned to the grid full-time after a three-year absence and after spending all of the 1994 season testing the new Firestone tires with driver Scott Pruett. Arciero Racing signed Hiro Matsushita and his Panasonic sponsorship. Gerry Forsythe left Forsythe/Green Racing to form the other new full-time team to the grid, Forsythe Racing, which signed Teo Fabi.

=== Supplier changes from 1994 ===
The Rahal-Hogan team switched from Honda to the Ilmor-Mercedes engine. Comptech Racing, PacWest Racing and Walker Racing switched from the Lola Cars chassis to Reynard Motorsport, while Galles Racing switched from Reynard to Lola. Payton/Coyne Racing switched from Goodyear to Firestone tires.

The following teams and drivers competed in the 1995 Indy Car World Series season. Firestone returned to IndyCar after two decades of absence.

| Team | Chassis | Engine | Tires | No. | Drivers | Rounds | Primary Sponsor |
|---|---|---|---|---|---|---|---|
| Marlboro Team Penske | Penske PC-24 | Mercedes-Benz IC108 | G | 1 | (United States) Al Unser Jr. | All | Marlboro |
| Marlboro Team Penske | Penske PC-24 | Mercedes-Benz IC108 | G | 2 | (Brazil) Emerson Fittipaldi | All | Marlboro |
| Newman/Haas Racing | Lola T95/00 | Ford Cosworth XB | G | 3 | (Canada) Paul Tracy | All | Budweiser |
| Newman/Haas Racing | Lola T95/00 | Ford Cosworth XB | G | 6 | (United States) Michael Andretti | All | Texaco-Havoline |
| Target Chip Ganassi Racing | Reynard 95I | Ford Cosworth XB | G | 4 | (United States) Bryan Herta | All | Scotch Tape |
| Target Chip Ganassi Racing | Reynard 95I | Ford Cosworth XB | G | 12 | (United States) Jimmy Vasser | All | STP |
| Walker Racing | Reynard 95I | Ford Cosworth XB | G | 5 | (United States) Robby Gordon | All | Valvoline |
| Walker Racing | Reynard 95I | Ford Cosworth XB | G | 15 | (Brazil) Christian Fittipaldi | All | Chapeco |
| Dick Simon Racing | Lola T95/00; Lola T94/00; Lola T92/00 | Ford Cosworth XB | G | 7 | (Chile) Eliseo Salazar | All | Cerveza Cristal |
| Dick Simon Racing | Lola T95/00; Lola T94/00; Lola T92/00 | Ford Cosworth XB | G | 22 | (Netherlands) Arie Luyendyk | 3 | WavePhore |
| Dick Simon Racing | Lola T95/00; Lola T94/00; Lola T92/00 | Ford Cosworth XB | G | 22 | (Mexico) Carlos Guerrero | 4–17 | Herdez |
| Dick Simon Racing | Lola T95/00; Lola T94/00; Lola T92/00 | Ford Cosworth XB | G | 99 | (United States) Dean Hall | 1–6 | Subway |
| Dick Simon Racing | Lola T95/00; Lola T94/00; Lola T92/00 | Ford Cosworth XB | G | 99 | (Brazil) Marco Greco | 9–10 | Brastemp |
| Hall Racing | Reynard 95I | Mercedes-Benz IC108 | G | 8 | (Brazil) Gil de Ferran | All | Pennzoil |
| Rahal-Hogan Racing | Lola T95/00 | Mercedes-Benz IC108 | G | 9 | (United States) Bobby Rahal | All | Miller Genuine Draft |
| Rahal-Hogan Racing | Lola T95/00 | Mercedes-Benz IC108 | G | 11 | (Brazil) Raul Boesel | All | Duracell |
| Galles Racing | Lola T95/00 | Mercedes-Benz IC108 | G | 10 | (Mexico) Adrián Fernández | All | Tecate |
| Galles Racing | Lola T95/00 | Mercedes-Benz IC108 | G | 55 | (Brazil) Marco Greco | 4–6, 8, 11–12, 14–17 | Brastemp |
| A. J. Foyt Enterprises | Lola T95/00 | Ford Cosworth XB | G | 14 | (United States) Eddie Cheever | 1–15 | Copenhagen |
| A. J. Foyt Enterprises | Lola T95/00 | Ford Cosworth XB | G | 14 | (United States) Brian Till | 16 | Copenhagen |
| A. J. Foyt Enterprises | Lola T95/00 | Ford Cosworth XB | G | 14 | (Sweden) Fredrik Ekblom | 17 | Copenhagen |
| Bettenhausen Motorsports | Penske PC-23 | Mercedes-Benz IC108 | G | 16 | (Sweden) Stefan Johansson | 1–5, 7–17 | Alumax |
| Bettenhausen Motorsports | Reynard 94I | Mercedes-Benz IC108 | G | 16 | (Sweden) Stefan Johansson | 6 | Alumax |
| PacWest Racing | Reynard 95I; Reynard 94I | Ford Cosworth XB | G | 17 | (United States) Danny Sullivan | 1–13 | Bank of America 3 Visa 14 |
| PacWest Racing | Reynard 95I; Reynard 94I | Ford Cosworth XB | G | 17 | (Argentina) Juan Manuel Fangio II | 14–17 | Bank of America 3 Visa 14 |
| PacWest Racing | Reynard 95I; Reynard 94I | Ford Cosworth XB | G | 18 | (Brazil) Maurício Gugelmin | All | Hollywood Cigarettes |
| Payton/Coyne Racing | Lola T94/00; Lola T95/00 | Ford Cosworth XB | F | 19 | (Belgium) Éric Bachelart | 1–4, 6, 8–12, 14 | AGFA |
| Payton/Coyne Racing | Lola T94/00; Lola T95/00 | Ford Cosworth XB | F | 19 | (United States) Buddy Lazier | 5, 7, 13, 15 | AGFA |
| Payton/Coyne Racing | Lola T94/00; Lola T95/00 | Ford Cosworth XB | F | 19 | (Canada) Ross Bentley | 16 | AGFA |
| Payton/Coyne Racing | Lola T94/00; Lola T95/00 | Ford Cosworth XB | F | 19 | (France) Franck Fréon | 17 | AGFA |
| Payton/Coyne Racing | Lola T94/00; Lola T95/00 | Ford Cosworth XB | F | 34 | (Italy) Alessandro Zampedri | All | Mi-Jack |
| Patrick Racing | Lola T95/00 | Ford Cosworth XB | F | 20 | (United States) Scott Pruett | All | Firestone |
| Arciero Racing | Reynard 94I | Ford Cosworth XB | F | 25 | (Japan) Hiro Matsushita | All | Panasonic |
| Team Green | Reynard 95I | Ford Cosworth XB | G | 27 | (Canada) Jacques Villeneuve | All | Player's |
| Tasman Motorsports | Reynard 95I | Honda HRX & HRH | F | 31 | (Brazil) André Ribeiro | All | LCI Communications |
| Forsythe Racing | Reynard 95I | Ford Cosworth XB | G | 33 | (Italy) Teo Fabi | All | Combustion Engineering |
Part Time and Indy 500 Only Entries
| Pagan Racing | Reynard 94I | Mercedes-Benz IC108 | G | 21 | (United States) Dennis Vitolo | 1 | Charter America |
| Pagan Racing | Reynard 94I | Mercedes-Benz IC108 | G | 21 | (Colombia) Roberto Guerrero | 3, 6 | Upper Deck |
| Tasman Motorsports | Reynard 95I | Honda HRX & HRH | F | 24 | (Canada) Scott Goodyear | 6, 14, 16 | LCI Communications 1 CTI Worldwide Communications 2 |
| Team Menard | Lola T95/00 | Buick Indy V6 | G | 40 | (Netherlands) Arie Luyendyk | 6 | Glidden |
| Team Menard | Lola T95/00 | Buick Indy V6 | G | 60 | (United States) Scott Brayton | 6 | Quaker State |
| Team Menard | Lola T95/00 | Buick Indy V6 | G | 80 | (United States) Buddy Lazier | 6 | Quaker State |
| A. J. Foyt Enterprises | Lola T95/00 | Ford Cosworth XB | G | 41 | (United States) Scott Sharp | 6 | Copenhagen |
| Greenfield Racing | Lola T92/00 | Greenfield | F | 42 | (United States) Michael Greenfield | 6 | Greenfield Competition |
| Arizona Motorsports | Lola T92/00 | Ford Cosworth XB | F | 44 | (United States) Jeff Ward | 6 | Arizona Executive Air |
| Comptech Racing | Reynard 95I | Honda HRX & HRH | F | 49 | (United States) Parker Johnstone | 8, 10, 12–14, 16–17 | Motorola |
| Beck Motorsports | Lola T95/00 | Ford Cosworth XB | F | 54 | (Japan) Hideshi Matsuda | 6 | Zunne Group |
| Project Indy | Reynard 95I; Reynard 94I; Lola T93/00 | Ford Cosworth XB | G | 64 | (Germany) Christian Danner | 1, 8 | No-Touch |
| Project Indy | Reynard 95I; Reynard 94I; Lola T93/00 | Ford Cosworth XB | G | 64 | (United States) Buddy Lazier | 2, 11 | No-Touch |
| Project Indy | Reynard 95I; Reynard 94I; Lola T93/00 | Ford Cosworth XB | G | 64 | (France) Franck Fréon | 4 | No-Touch |
| Project Indy | Reynard 95I; Reynard 94I; Lola T93/00 | Ford Cosworth XB | G | 64 | (United States) Johnny Parsons | 6 | No-Touch |
| Project Indy | Reynard 95I; Reynard 94I; Lola T93/00 | Ford Cosworth XB | G | 64 | (Austria) Hubert Stromberger | 10, 14 | No-Touch |
| Project Indy | Reynard 95I; Reynard 94I; Lola T93/00 | Ford Cosworth XB | G | 64 | (Italy) Domenico Schiattarella | 16–17 | No-Touch |
| Dick Simon Racing | Lola T95/00; Lola T94/00; Lola T92/00 | Ford Cosworth XB | G | 77 | (United States) Davy Jones | 6 | Byrd's |
| Dick Simon Racing | Lola T95/00; Lola T94/00; Lola T92/00 | Ford Cosworth XB | G | 90 | (United States) Lyn St. James | 6, 7, 13 | Whitlock Auto Supply |
| Hemelgarn Racing | Reynard 95I | Ford Cosworth XB | F | 91 | (United States) Stan Fox | 6 | Delta Faucet |
| Hemelgarn Racing | Lola T92/00 | Ford Cosworth XB | F | 95 | (United States) Davey Hamilton | 6 | Delta Faucet |
| Hemelgarn Racing | Lola T92/00 | Buick Indy V6 | F | 96 | (United Kingdom) Jim Crawford | 6 | Hemelgarn Racing |
| Autosport Racing Team | Lola T92/00 | Menard Indy V-6 | F | 92 | (France) Franck Fréon | 6 | Indy Regency Racing |

== Schedule ==
| Icon | Legend |
|---|---|
| O | Oval/Speedway |
| R | Road course |
| S | Street circuit |

| Rnd | Date | Race Name | Circuit | Location |
|---|---|---|---|---|
| 1 | March 5 | (United States) Marlboro Grand Prix of Miami | S Bicentennial Park | Miami, Florida |
| 2 | March 19 | IndyCar Australia | S Surfers Paradise Street Circuit | Surfers Paradise, Australia |
| 3 | April 2 | (United States) Slick 50 200 | O Phoenix International Raceway | Phoenix, Arizona |
| 4 | April 9 | (United States) Toyota Grand Prix of Long Beach | S Streets of Long Beach | Long Beach, California |
| 5 | April 23 | (United States) Bosch Spark Plug Grand Prix | O Nazareth Speedway | Nazareth, Pennsylvania |
| 6 | May 28 | (United States) 79th Indianapolis 500* | O Indianapolis Motor Speedway | Speedway, Indiana |
| 7 | June 4 | (United States) Miller Genuine Draft 200 | O Milwaukee Mile | West Allis, Wisconsin |
| 8 | June 11 | (United States) ITT Automotive Detroit Grand Prix | S The Raceway on Belle Isle Park | Detroit, Michigan |
| 9 | June 25 | (United States) Budweiser/G. I. Joe's 200 | R Portland International Raceway | Portland, Oregon |
| 10 | July 9 | (United States) Texaco/Havoline 200 | R Road America | Elkhart Lake, Wisconsin |
| 11 | July 16 | (Canada) Molson Indy Toronto | S Exhibition Place | Toronto, Ontario |
| 12 | July 23 | (United States) Medic Drug Grand Prix of Cleveland | R Cleveland Burke Lakefront Airport | Cleveland, Ohio |
| 13 | July 30 | (United States) Marlboro 500 | O Michigan International Speedway | Brooklyn, Michigan |
| 14 | August 13 | (United States) Miller Genuine Draft 200 | R Mid-Ohio Sports Car Course | Lexington, Ohio |
| 15 | August 20 | (United States) New England 200 | O New Hampshire International Speedway | Loudon, New Hampshire |
| 16 | September 3 | (Canada) Molson Indy Vancouver | S Streets of Vancouver | Vancouver, British Columbia |
| 17 | September 10 | (United States) Toyota Grand Prix of Monterey | R Laguna Seca Raceway | Monterey, California |

* Indianapolis was USAC-sanctioned but counted towards the CART title.

== Results ==
| Round | Race | Pole position | Fastest lap | Race Winner | | | | Race Time | Report |
| Round | Race | Pole position | Fastest lap | Driver | Team | Chassis | Engine | Race Time | Report |
|---|---|---|---|---|---|---|---|---|---|
| 1 | Miami | (United States) Michael Andretti | (United States) Scott Pruett | (Canada) Jacques Villeneuve | Team Green | Reynard 95I | Ford-Cosworth XB | 1:59:16 | Report |
| 2 | Surfers Paradise | (United States) Michael Andretti | (United States) Michael Andretti | (Canada) Paul Tracy | Newman/Haas Racing | Lola T9500 | Ford-Cosworth XB | 1:58:26 | Report |
| 3 | Phoenix | (United States) Bryan Herta | (Brazil) Emerson Fittipaldi | (United States) Robby Gordon | Walker Racing | Reynard 95I | Ford-Cosworth XB | 1:29:33 | Report |
| 4 | Long Beach | (United States) Michael Andretti | (United States) Michael Andretti | (United States) Al Unser Jr. | Marlboro Team Penske | Penske PC-24 | Mercedes | 1:49:32 | Report |
| 5 | Nazareth | (United States) Robby Gordon | (Brazil) Emerson Fittipaldi | (Brazil) Emerson Fittipaldi | Marlboro Team Penske | Penske PC-24 | Mercedes | 1:31:23 | Report |
| 6 | Indianapolis | (United States) Scott Brayton | (Canada) Scott Goodyear | (Canada) Jacques Villeneuve | Team Green | Reynard 95I | Ford-Cosworth XB | 3:15:17 | Report |
| 7 | Milwaukee | (Italy) Teo Fabi | (Italy) Teo Fabi | (Canada) Paul Tracy | Newman/Haas Racing | Lola T9500 | Ford-Cosworth XB | 1:27:23 | Report |
| 8 | Belle Isle | (United States) Robby Gordon | (United States) Michael Andretti | (United States) Robby Gordon | Walker Racing | Reynard 95I | Ford-Cosworth XB | 1:56:11 | Report |
| 9 | Portland | (Canada) Jacques Villeneuve | (United States) Al Unser Jr. | (United States) Al Unser Jr. | Marlboro Team Penske | Penske PC-24 | Mercedes | 1:54:49 | Report |
| 10 | Road America | (Canada) Jacques Villeneuve | (Canada) Jacques Villeneuve | (Canada) Jacques Villeneuve | Team Green | Reynard 95I | Ford-Cosworth XB | 1:55:29 | Report |
| 11 | Toronto | (Canada) Jacques Villeneuve | (United States) Bobby Rahal | (United States) Michael Andretti | Newman/Haas Racing | Lola T9500 | Ford-Cosworth XB | 1:50:25 | Report |
| 12 | Cleveland | (Brazil) Gil de Ferran | (Canada) Jacques Villeneuve | (Canada) Jacques Villeneuve | Team Green | Reynard 95I | Ford-Cosworth XB | 1:38:19 | Report |
| 13 | Michigan | (United States) Parker Johnstone | (United States) Parker Johnstone | (United States) Scott Pruett | Patrick Racing | Lola T9500 | Ford-Cosworth XB | 3:07:52 | Report |
| 14 | Mid-Ohio | (Canada) Jacques Villeneuve | (United States) Al Unser Jr. | (United States) Al Unser Jr. | Marlboro Team Penske | Penske PC-24 | Mercedes | 1:44:04 | Report |
| 15 | New Hampshire | (Brazil) André Ribeiro | (Italy) Teo Fabi | (Brazil) André Ribeiro | Tasman Motorsports | Reynard 95I | Honda | 1:34:36 | Report |
| 16 | Vancouver | (Canada) Jacques Villeneuve | (United States) Bobby Rahal | (United States) Al Unser Jr. | Marlboro Team Penske | Penske PC-24 | Mercedes | 1:46:54 | Report |
| 17 | Laguna Seca | (Canada) Jacques Villeneuve | (Brazil) Gil de Ferran | (Brazil) Gil de Ferran | Jim Hall Racing | Reynard 95I | Mercedes | 1:53:17 | Report |

=== Final driver standings ===
| Pos | Driver | BIC (United States) | SUR (Australia) | PHX (United States) | LBH (United States) | NAZ (United States) | INDY (United States) | MIL (United States) | BEL (United States) | POR (United States) | ROA (United States) | TOR (Canada) | CLE (United States) | MIS (United States) | MOH (United States) | NHS (United States) | VAN (Canada) | LAG (United States) | Pts |
|---|---|---|---|---|---|---|---|---|---|---|---|---|---|---|---|---|---|---|---|
| 1 | (Canada) Jacques Villeneuve | 1 | 20 | 5 | 25 | 2* | 1 | 6 | 9 | **20** | **1*** | **3** | 1 | 10 | **3** | 4 | **12** | **11** | 172 |
| 2 | (United States) Al Unser Jr. | 15 | 6 | 8 | 1* | 13 | DNQ | 2* | 5 | 1* | 28 | 26 | 18 | 2 | 1 | 3 | 1* | 6 | 161 |
| 3 | (United States) Bobby Rahal | 3 | 2 | 21 | 21 | 6 | 3 | 13 | 24 | 3 | 5 | 2 | 4 | 8 | 26 | 10 | 5 | 7 | 128 |
| 4 | (United States) Michael Andretti | **20*** | **9*** | 2 | **9** | 22 | 25 | 3 | 4 | 4 | 27 | 1* | 7 | 25 | 19* | 2 | 21 | 4 | 123 |
| 5 | (United States) Robby Gordon | 13 | 14 | 1 | 22 | **4** | 5 | 5 | **1*** | 8 | 26 | 5 | 6 | Wth | 8 | 9 | 3 | 15 | 121 |
| 6 | (Canada) Paul Tracy | 27 | 1 | 4 | 28 | 26 | 24 | 1 | 8 | 18 | 2 | 8 | 26 | 23 | 2 | 23 | 8 | 2 | 115 |
| 7 | (United States) Scott Pruett | 4 | 3 | 9 | 2 | 8 | 19 | 12 | 3 | 13 | 7 | 25 | 16 | 1 | 11 | 24 | 6 | 5 | 112 |
| 8 | (United States) Jimmy Vasser | 8 | 24 | 23 | 23 | 24 | 22 | 9 | 2 | 2 | 3 | 17 | 3 | 7 | 9 | 6 | 27 | 8 | 92 |
| 9 | (Italy) Teo Fabi | 16 | 13 | 7 | 3 | 7 | 8 | **4** | 7 | 23 | 9 | 4 | 19 | 4 | 17 | 12 | 19 | 9 | 83 |
| 10 | (Brazil) Maurício Gugelmin | 2 | 4 | 13 | 5 | 17 | 6* | 14 | 15 | 7 | 24 | 12 | 23 | 11 | 6 | 11 | 20 | 3 | 80 |
| 11 | (Brazil) Emerson Fittipaldi | 24 | 18 | 3* | 20 | 1 | DNQ | 23 | 10 | 21 | 15 | 10 | 25 | 5 | 21 | 5 | 7 | 16 | 67 |
| 12 | (Mexico) Adrián Fernández | 11 | 26 | 12 | 18 | 9 | 21 | 10 | 6 | 9 | 6 | 7 | 12 | 3 | 4 | 26 | 22 | 10 | 66 |
| 13 | (Sweden) Stefan Johansson | 22 | 17 | 24 | 6 | 3 | 16 | 21 | 11 | 6 | 10 | 14 | 8 | 6 | 23 | 25 | 4 | 14 | 60 |
| 14 | (Brazil) Gil de Ferran RY | 25 | 16 | 11 | 27 | 19 | 29 | 8 | 16 | 10 | 21 | 16 | **14*** | 12 | 24 | 7 | 2 | 1* | 56 |
| 15 | (Brazil) Christian Fittipaldi R | 5 | 25 | 10 | 14 | 20 | 2 | 7 | 17 | 12 | 8 | 9 | 24 | 9 | 25 | 8 | 24 | 24 | 54 |
| 16 | (Brazil) Raul Boesel | 6 | 8 | 6 | 16 | 10 | 20 | 11 | 28 | 5 | 22 | 6 | 20 | 24 | 20 | 18 | 10 | 12 | 48 |
| 17 | (Brazil) André Ribeiro R | 21 | 23 | 26 | 12 | 11 | 18 | 25 | 18 | 14 | 4 | 13 | 27 | 21* | 27 | **1*** | 23 | 26 | 38 |
| 18 | (United States) Eddie Cheever | 14 | 7 | 14 | 4 | 5 | 31 | 26 | 25 | 25 | 17 | 11 | 22 | 19 | 10 | 17 | | | 33 |
| 19 | (United States) Danny Sullivan | 9 | 5 | 27 | 10 | 18 | 9 | 17 | 12 | 22 | 25 | 18 | 5 | 16 | | | | | 32 |
| 20 | (United States) Bryan Herta | 10 | 15 | **20** | 26 | 23 | 13 | 24 | 27 | 26 | 14 | 27 | 2 | 15 | 5 | 19 | 16 | 25 | 30 |
| 21 | (Chile) Eliseo Salazar R | 17 | 10 | 15 | 24 | 12 | 4 | 16 | 20 | 15 | 18 | 21 | 10 | 18 | 13 | 13 | 13 | DNQ | 19 |
| 22 | (Italy) Alessandro Zampedri | 23 | 19 | 19 | 8 | 15 | 11 | 22 | 26 | 16 | 20 | 23 | 9 | 13 | 14 | 14 | 9 | 20 | 15 |
| 23 | (Belgium) Éric Bachelart | 19 | 22 | 18 | 7 | | 28 | | 23 | 19 | 11 | 22 | 21 | | 16 | | | | 8 |
| 24 | (Argentina) Juan Manuel Fangio II R | | | | | | | | | | | | | | 7 | 15 | 28 | 13 | 6 |
| 25 | (Germany) Christian Danner | 7 | | | | | | | 22 | | | | | | | | | | 6 |
| 26 | (Netherlands) Arie Luyendyk | | | 25 | | | 7 | | | | | | | | | | | | 6 |
| 27 | (United States) Parker Johnstone | | | | | | | | 19 | | 12 | | 11 | **22** | 28 | | 11 | 17 | 6 |
| 28 | (Japan) Hiro Matsushita | 26 | 11 | 22 | 19 | DNS | 10 | 19 | 14 | 17 | 13 | 19 | 13 | 20 | 15 | 22 | 17 | 22 | 5 |
| 29 | (Brazil) Marco Greco | | | | 13 | 21 | DNQ | | 13 | 11 | 23 | 20 | 15 | | 22 | 20 | 25 | 23 | 2 |
| 30 | (Mexico) Carlos Guerrero R | | | | 11 | 14 | 33 | 15 | 21 | 24 | 19 | 24 | 17 | 26 | 18 | 16 | 15 | 18 | 2 |
| 31 | (United States) Dean Hall | 12 | 12 | 17 | 17 | 16 | Wth | | | | | | | | | | | | 2 |
| 32 | (Canada) Scott Goodyear | | | | | | 14 | | | | | | | | 12 | | 14 | | 1 |
| 33 | (Colombia) Roberto Guerrero | | | 16 | | | 12 | | | | | | | | | | | | 1 |
| 34 | (United States) Scott Brayton | | | | | | **17** | | | | | | | | | | | | 1 |
| 35 | (United States) Buddy Lazier | | 21 | | | 25 | 27 | 18 | | | | 15 | | 14 | | 21 | | | 0 |
| 36 | (France) Franck Fréon | | | | 15 | | DNQ | | | | | | | | | | | DNQ | 0 |
| 37 | (Japan) Hideshi Matsuda | | | | | | 15 | | | | | | | | | | | | 0 |
| 38 | (Austria) Hubert Stromberger R | | | | | | | | | | 16 | | | | DNQ | | | | 0 |
| 39 | (United States) Lyn St. James | | | | | | 32 | 20 | | | | | | 17 | | | | | 0 |
| 40 | (Italy) Domenico Schiattarella | | | | | | | | | | | | | | | | 18 | 21 | 0 |
| 41 | (United States) Dennis Vitolo | 18 | | | | | | | | | | | | | | | | | 0 |
| 42 | (Sweden) Fredrik Ekblom R | | | | | | | | | | | | | | | | | 19 | 0 |
| 43 | (United States) Davy Jones | | | | | | 23 | | | | | | | | | | | | 0 |
| 44 | (United States) Scott Sharp | | | | | | 26 | | | | | | | | | | | | 0 |
| 45 | (United States) Brian Till | | | | | | | | | | | | | | | | 26 | | 0 |
| 46 | (United States) Stan Fox | | | | | | 30 | | | | | | | | | | | | 0 |
| | (United Kingdom) Jim Crawford | | | | | | DNQ | | | | | | | | | | | | 0 |
| | (United States) Michael Greenfield | | | | | | DNQ | | | | | | | | | | | | 0 |
| | (United States) Davey Hamilton | | | | | | DNQ | | | | | | | | | | | | 0 |
| | (United States) Johnny Parsons | | | | | | DNQ | | | | | | | | | | | | 0 |
| | (United States) Jeff Ward | | | | | | DNQ | | | | | | | | | | | | 0 |
| | (Canada) Ross Bentley | | | | | | | | | | | | | | | | DNQ | | 0 |
| | (United States) Mike Groff | | | | | | Wth | | | | | | | | | | | | 0 |
| | (United States) Jeff Wood | | | | | | | | | | | Wth | | | | | | | 0 |
| Pos | Country | BIC (United States) | SUR (Australia) | PHX (United States) | LBH (United States) | NAZ (United States) | INDY (United States) | MIL (United States) | BEL (United States) | POR (United States) | ROA (United States) | TOR (Canada) | CLE (United States) | MIS (United States) | MOH (United States) | NHS (United States) | VAN (Canada) | LAG (United States) | Pts |

| Color | Result |
|---|---|
| Gold | Winner |
| Silver | 2nd place |
| Bronze | 3rd place |
| Green | 4th–6th place |
| Light Blue | 7th–12th place |
| Dark Blue | Finished (Outside Top 12) |
| Purple | Did not finish |
| Red | Did not qualify (DNQ) |
| Brown | Withdrawn (Wth) |
| Black | Disqualified (DSQ) |
| White | Did not start (DNS) |
| Blank | Did not participate (DNP) |
| Blank | Not competing |

**In-line notation**
| **Bold** | Pole position |
| Italics | Ran fastest race lap |
| * | Led most race laps |
| RY | Rookie of the Year |
| R | Rookie |

=== Nations' Cup ===
- Top result per race counts towards Nations' Cup.

| Pos | Country | BIC (United States) | SUR (Australia) | PHX (United States) | LBH (United States) | NAZ (United States) | INDY (United States) | MIL (United States) | BEL (United States) | POR (United States) | ROA (United States) | TOR (Canada) | CLE (United States) | MIS (United States) | MOH (United States) | NHS (United States) | VAN (Canada) | LAG (United States) | Pts |
|---|---|---|---|---|---|---|---|---|---|---|---|---|---|---|---|---|---|---|---|
| 1 | United States | 3 | 2 | 1 | 1 | 4 | 3 | 2 | 1 | 1 | 3 | 1 | 2 | 1 | 1 | 2 | 1 | 4 | 290 |
| 2 | Canada | 1 | 1 | 4 | 25 | 2 | 1 | 1 | 8 | 18 | 1 | 3 | 1 | 10 | 2 | 4 | 8 | 2 | 219 |
| 3 | Brazil | 2 | 4 | 3 | 5 | 1 | 2 | 7 | 10 | 5 | 4 | 6 | 14 | 5 | 6 | 1 | 2 | 1 | 201 |
| 4 | Italy | 16 | 13 | 7 | 3 | 7 | 8 | 4 | 7 | 16 | 9 | 4 | 9 | 4 | 14 | 12 | 9 | 9 | 90 |
| 5 | Mexico | 11 | 26 | 12 | 11 | 9 | 21 | 10 | 6 | 9 | 6 | 7 | 12 | 3 | 4 | 16 | 15 | 10 | 68 |
| 6 | Sweden | 22 | 17 | 24 | 6 | 3 | 16 | 21 | 11 | 6 | 10 | 14 | 8 | 6 | 23 | 25 | 4 | 14 | 60 |
| 7 | Chile | 17 | 10 | 15 | 24 | 12 | 4 | 16 | 20 | 15 | 18 | 21 | 10 | 18 | 13 | 13 | 13 | DNQ | 19 |
| 8 | Belgium | 19 | 22 | 18 | 7 | | 28 | | 23 | 19 | 11 | 22 | 21 | | 16 | | | | 8 |
| 9 | Argentina | | | | | | | | | | | | | | 7 | 15 | 28 | 13 | 6 |
| 10 | Germany | 7 | | | | | | | 22 | | | | | | | | | | 6 |
| 11 | Netherlands | | | 25 | | | 7 | | | | | | | | | | | | 6 |
| 12 | Japan | 26 | 11 | 22 | 19 | DNS | 10 | 19 | 14 | 17 | 13 | 19 | 13 | 20 | 15 | 22 | 17 | 22 | 5 |
| 13 | Colombia | | | 16 | | | 12 | | | | | | | | | | | | 1 |
| 14 | France | | | | 15 | | DNQ | | | | | | | | | | | DNQ | 0 |
| 15 | Austria | | | | | | | | | | 16 | | Wth | | DNQ | | | | 0 |
| | Finland | | | | | | DNQ | | | | | | | | | | | | 0 |
| | Scotland | | | | | | DNQ | | | | | | | | | | | | 0 |
| Pos | Country | BIC (United States) | SUR (Australia) | PHX (United States) | LBH (United States) | NAZ (United States) | INDY (United States) | MIL (United States) | BEL (United States) | POR (United States) | ROA (United States) | TOR (Canada) | CLE (United States) | MIS (United States) | MOH (United States) | NHS (United States) | VAN (Canada) | LAG (United States) | Pts |

=== Chassis Constructors' Cup ===
| Pos | Chassis | Pts | Wins |
|---|---|---|---|
| 1 | (United Kingdom) Reynard 95I/94I | 302 | 8 |
| 2 | (United Kingdom) Lola T9500/T9400/T9300 | 273 | 4 |
| 3 | (United States) Penske PC-24/PC-23 | 202 | 5 |
| Pos | Chassis | Pts | Wins |

=== Engine Manufacturers' Cup ===
| Pos | Engine | Pts | Wins |
|---|---|---|---|
| 1 | (United States) Ford XB | 331 | 10 |
| 2 | (United Kingdom) / (Germany) Ilmor-Mercedes Benz | 267 | 6 |
| 3 | (Japan) Honda | 47 | 1 |
| 4 | (United States) Menard | 7 | 0 |
| Pos | Engine | Pts | Wins |

== Race notes ==
=== Miami ===
The return of the Grand Prix of Miami was held around Bicentennial Park. The race was presented by Toyota, who had announced plans to enter IndyCar racing in 1996 with Dan Gurney's All American Racers team. The grand marshal for the race was Mario Andretti, who had retired after the 1994 IndyCar season. Polesitter Michael Andretti returned to Newman-Haas Racing after two years with other teams (McLaren in the 1993 Formula One World Championship and Ganassi in the 1994 Indy Car World Series). Michael's new teammate Paul Tracy clipped a barrier in the Turn 3 chicane on Lap 2, bringing out a full-course yellow. A few laps after the restart Bryan Herta, in his first race for Ganassi, locked up the brakes in Turn 12 but missed the tire wall. At Lap 15 two possible winners dropped from contention; rookie Gil de Ferran, who had qualified an impressive 4th for Jim Hall, lost use of his transmission, and reigning IndyCar champion Al Unser Jr.' s new Penske PC-24 developed an electrical problem. On Lap 19 rookie Christian Fittipaldi made his first IndyCar pit stop and ran over the used left front tire as he left, catching a few inches of air. Eddie Cheever, another Formula One veteran, spun harmlessly in Turn 12 on Lap 22. Two laps later rookie Andre Ribeiro tried to meet the apex of Turn 10, but failed to see Adrian Fernandez in his mirrors. Their accident brought out another full-course yellow. Emerson Fittipaldi's engine failed during the yellow; another contender eliminated. After the restart, leader Michael Andretti was trying to pass rookie backmarker Eliseo Salazar in Turn 1. Salazar came down on him entering Turn 1, squeezing Michael into the inner wall, but he continued without incident and the car seemed to be running just fine. Later on that lap, Dennis Vitolo (perhaps best known for his crash in the 1994 Indianapolis 500 with Nigel Mansell) spun exiting the Turn 3 chicane. He hit the wall in the Pagan Racing Reynard but drove back to pits without further incident. On Lap 35 the yellow was out again after Payton/Coyne Racing's Alessandro Zampedri crashed in Turn 5.

At halfway the leaders were Michael Andretti, Maurício Gugelmin, Jacques Villeneuve, Danny Sullivan, Scott Pruett, and Bobby Rahal. For seventh place some intense racing took place between Chip Ganassi's new hire Jimmy Vasser and Walker Racing teammates Robby Gordon and Christian Fittipaldi. On Lap 50 Andretti made his final pit stop, but ended his day because the suspension damage in the right front (from the contact with Salazar) was too severe. This handed the lead to Gugelmin, Andretti's former teammate, for the first time in his IndyCar career. Soon after Andre Ribeiro found the Turn 5 tire barrier, meaning that final pit stops would occur under the yellow. Jacques Villeneuve's team won the battle out of the pits. With less than 20 laps to go, Sullivan spun out of 5th place right in front of Robby Gordon. The 1988 PPG Cup Champion stalled the engine, as he had not raced an IndyCar in 18 months, and the yellows were waved again. Bryan Herta was another victim of the Turn 5 wall a few laps later, but was rescued from the tires and finished the race. On Lap 84 Gordon crashed heavily in Turn 6 but walked away. Villeneuve held off Gugelmin and Rahal to win the first race of the new season.

=== Surfers Paradise ===
See 1995 Indycar Australia

=== Phoenix ===
Sophomore driver Bryan Herta won his first career pole with a new track record. In traffic, Herta and Paul Tracy diced for the lead until Michael Andretti took the lead on Lap 33. On Lap 39 rookie Andre Ribeiro crashed in Turn 2, bringing out the first yellow of the day. Andretti stayed in the lead, but polesitter Herta ran over his air hose and received a stop and go penalty after the restart. Tracy took the lead in Turn 1 with a four wide pass on the inside of Michael, Robby Gordon, and Dean Hall on the far right. Gordon, who was one lap down, took his lap back in Lap 61. Ten laps later Michael Andretti retook the lead. By halfway, last year's winner Emerson Fittipaldi was in striking distance of the lead. He passed Andretti on Lap 105 to lead his first laps of the season. Soon after, the second caution flag was waved when Stefan Johansson's Bettenhausen-prepared Penske PC-23 trailed smoke. Michael Andretti was hoping for an adjustment in the left rear but it wasn't made. When the race restarted, Tracy briefly took the lead from Fittipaldi. Frontrunner Scott Pruett was charged with a stop and go penalty for a blend line violation during the yellow.

With less than 50 laps to go, rookie Gil de Ferran spun off Turn 2 and hit the inside tire wall and brought out the yellow flag again. On the restart Tracy took the lead from Fittipaldi again, and touched with Scott Pruett, one lap back after his stop and go. Pruett lost two more laps after a precautionary pit stop. Both Tracy and Fittipaldi pitted for a "splash-and-go", Emerson doing so with 7 laps to go. Michael Andretti was the new leader, but his crew did not inform him of this, and he allowed Robby Gordon to pass him for the win with 5 laps to go. Michael told ABC's Gary Gerould, "I had no idea I was in the lead.".

=== Long Beach ===
A battle for third place went wrong on Lap 17 when Paul Tracy tried to pass rookie Gil de Ferran in Turn 3. The two collided and brought out the safety car. Bobby Rahal, Emerson Fittipaldi, and Michael Andretti all encountered troubles later while running second to Al Unser Jr. Andretti nearly spun at Lap 55 when he had simultaneously overtaken Unser and backmarker Dean Hall on the backstretch and locked up the rear brakes. He didn't crash, but dropped to 6th. Rahal took second, and nearly took the lead after pit stops, but his transmission failed after 77 laps. Fittipaldi's engine expired with 20 laps remaining. Andretti fought back to reclaim 2nd, but repeated his Lap 55 mistake on Lap 102. Because he had lost first gear earlier in the race, he stalled while trying to restart with 2nd gear. Teo Fabi stole 2nd, but was penalised because he did so under Andretti's local yellow flag. Eddie Cheever ran out of fuel on the final lap, and Christian Fittipaldi (who would have been on the lead lap) ran out before he could take the white flag, dropping to 14th. Unser won his record 6th Long Beach Grand Prix by 23 seconds.

=== Nazareth ===
Eddie Cheever started 21st and made his second and final pit stop at Lap 106. Car owner and race engineer A. J. Foyt planned to keep Cheever on the track to the checkered flag, hoping for his first win as an owner since Foyt himself won the Pocono 500 in the 1981 USAC season. Cheever was looking for his first career IndyCar win; his best result had been 2nd to Bobby Rahal at Phoenix in 1992. Separate incidents for hometown favorite Michael Andretti and rookie Gil de Ferran helped Cheever conserve fuel. The race resumed at Lap 195 with Cheever in the lead. He rocketed away as the instrument panel indicated that he had ample fuel. However, fuel gremlins hadn't left Foyt's team since Long Beach, as the #14 ran out of fuel again in Turn 2 on Lap 199. Emerson Fittipaldi took the lead, held off Jacques Villeneuve, winning in eleven consecutive seasons (dating back to 1985), and claiming what would be his 22nd and final IndyCar victory.

=== Indianapolis 500 ===
The Indianapolis 500 was sanctioned by USAC but was included in the championship.

See 1995 Indianapolis 500 for race results and other information.

=== Milwaukee ===
Italy's Teo Fabi, driving for Forsythe Racing won his first pole since Denver in 1990 for the Porsche team. The start was aborted after an improper field alignment, but the start was clean on Lap 2. On Lap 7 Michael Andretti touched Robby Gordon's left rear tire with his right front wing; the contact was dramatic but harmless. Fabi led the first 27 laps until Al Unser Jr. (looking to put the DNQ at Indy behind him) overtook him in traffic. Behind him, Paul Tracy was making bold passes on the outside in the same traffic. Fabi was the first to make a pit stop at Lap 63, followed by Unser at Lap 65. Tracy came in ten laps later, followed by his teammate Andretti, who stalled exiting his pit and lost several seconds before continuing. Unser reclaimed the lead after the first round of stops. At Lap 124 the first real yellow of the day (the aborted start counting as the first) came when Chilean rookie Eliseo Salazar spun in Turn 4. Emerson Fittipaldi attempted to sneak into the pits for his final stop, but after he slowed to avoid Salazar he collected marbles on his tires which, adding to his oversteer condition, caused him to spin into the pitlane and he nudged the inside wall with the right rear. He was done for the day. Under the yellow the leaders made their second and final pit stops, and Tracy beat Unser out of the pits. Al Jr. retook the lead from Tracy on Lap 144, and as they sliced through lapped traffic Tracy took the lead with 22 laps to go. A few laps later, Tracy tried to pass a group of cars (trailed by Alessandro Zampedri) on the outside, and he lost traction momentarily but continued without further incident. Fuel concerns were eminent in both the Penske and Newman-Haas pits, but Tracy took the checkered flag ahead of a fast-closing Unser by less than one second.

=== Portland ===
Al Unser Jr. took the chequered flag, but Jimmy Vasser was declared the winner. Unser was disqualified because of ride height issues. This was caused by erosion of the skidplate on the kerbing. Shortly after the season was over, Unser was re-declared the winner, taking from Vasser what would have been his first CART IndyCar win.

=== Toronto ===
IndyCar point leader Jacques Villeneuve set a new track record (57.230 seconds) in winning his third consecutive pole for the 10th annual Molson Indy Toronto. Inaugural winner Bobby Rahal and four-time Toronto winner Michael Andretti, neither of whom had won in 1995, started in Row 3. The first incident of the day began when Stefan Johansson tried to sneak around Raul Boesel in Turn 3 (a hard braking zone and passing opportunity where many incidents take place) but bumped Bryan Herta into the wall. Herta then bounced off Eddie Cheever, damaging the right front suspension, and stalled the engine after missing the corner. On Lap 9 the order was Villeuenve, Vasser, Pruett, Andretti, Tracy, Fabi, Rahal, Unser and de Ferran, followed by Robby Gordon and rookie Andre Ribeiro, who tried to outbrake Gordon in Turn 3 in a battle for 10th place. Ribeiro spun after they touched and dropped to last. On Lap 17 Pruett spun out of 3rd place in Turn 8. On the next lap Unser tried to outbrake Rahal (who was stuck behind Fabi, who was a bit off the pace) in Turn 3, but the two champions touched and Unser tagged the outside wall, and the first full-course yellow was brought out. Stefan Johansson, who had just pitted, lost his right rear tire coming onto the backstretch. Pruett then retired with a leak in the cooling system after setting the fastest lap of the race. In a strange scoring error, leader Villeneuve was dropped to 5th after his pit stop because he was not picked up as the leader. Car owner Barry Green was not pleased. The restart was interrupted by an unusual situation at the back of the field. 16th placed Éric Bachelart was involved in a spectacular Turn 7 accident that also involved Eliseo Salazar, Marco Greco, and Carlos Guerrero, who was launched over Alessandro Zampedri. Bachelart said in his interview with Gary Gerould that the field, several seconds in front of him, suddenly slowed down after catching the leaders. Turn 7 is a flat corner (taken without lifting off the throttle) and a blind corner, catching the cars involved by surprise. Guerrero shared Bachelart's opinion. No one was injured in the melee.

On the restart Michael Andretti led Maurício Gugelmin and Paul Tracy. Tracy tried to outbrake Gugelmin on the outside of Turn 3, but the two touched wheels and Tracy spun. Michael and "Big Mo" were now trailed by Bobby Rahal, Villeneuve, and Jimmy Vasser. Rahal began losing ground behind Gugelmin, who had yet to pit, and was trapped behind him until the Brazilian pitted at Lap 43. At the same time, backmarker Buddy Lazier spun the Project Indy car in Turn 3. A lap later Andretti caught backmarker Hiro Matsushita, already infamous for not yielding to the leaders, and lost 4 of the 9 seconds he had gained over Rahal. The two pitted on Lap 63 with over 15 seconds over 3rd placed Jacques Villeneuve, who pitted on the next lap. No change among the leaders through pit stops, but Rahal caught Andretti in lapped traffic; the pack included Johansson, Ribeiro, Cheever, and Danny Sullivan, who lost 5 laps after a tow back to the pits. At Lap 75 Sullivan passed Cheever, who tried to meet his apex after being passed. When Cheever turned in he touched the leader Andretti, who was trying to lap him. The light contact didn't appear to damage the car. 4th place Vasser dropped from the race with 13 laps to go with a broken header. Michael Andretti took the win ahead of Rahal and point leader Villeneuve.

=== Cleveland ===
Rookie Gil de Ferran claimed his first CART pole position with a new track record (58.328 seconds, 146.2 mph). At the start, in Turns 9 and 10 (the final chicane), rookie Andre Ribeiro and 1993 Cleveland winner Paul Tracy touched wheels and spun off. Both made unsuccessful attempts to continue in the race, and retired early. Scott Pruett was also caught up in the mess, losing a lap before returning. Throughout the bulk of the race de Ferran exploited the potential of his car, proving to be difficult to beat. Second placed Teo Fabi, if anybody, seemed to be the only man who could outrun him. Behind them, Michael Andretti and Bryan Herta were in close proximity for most of the race. They were later joined by Robby Gordon and point leader Jacques Villeneuve as the "best of the rest". Mid-race, Gordon and Villeneuve showed their own competitive spirits (perhaps too competitive) by pressing on each other through Turn 2 and missing Turn 3. Each ran through the grass and continued on. Teo Fabi stayed out several laps longer than de Ferran for final pit stops, coming in at Lap 66. He left with a 4-second lead over de Ferran, but came back in immediately and retired the car with a broken header.

Éric Bachelart crashed in Turn 9 to bring out the final caution flag. On the restart, 4th placed Robby Gordon took the lead briefly with a very deep entry into Turn 1. de Ferran held the lead, but was again challenged next time around in Turn 1 when Andretti passed him on the outside as Gordon passed him on the inside (ironically, all three cars were sponsored by rival brands of motor oil). Gordon slowed with a flat tyre (blaming Andretti over the radio to Derrick Walker), dropping from contention. With 5 laps to go, de Ferran passed Andretti for the lead exiting Turn 8 and was about to lap Scott Pruett as well. Proper racing etiquette is that a lapped car, regardless of pace should yield to a lead lap car. However, Pruett did not do this, and collided with de Ferran (who perhaps was not close enough to make Pruett think that he would attempt a pass), putting them both out of the race. The order was now Andretti, Herta, and Villeneuve. On Lap 89 (of 90) Herta went for the lead in Turn 9, but he slowed to let Andretti by because of the local yellow (overtaking is illegal in a yellow zone). Jacques Villeneuve had the proper momentum to pass both of them, and after a touch with Andretti in Turn 1, he took off and won his 5th race in 28 starts. ABC Sports' Sam Posey called this race the greatest of the year, and pointed out that the widest course on the schedule was producing the closest racing.

=== Marlboro 500 ===
Before qualifications, Walker Racing's Robby Gordon had a hard practice accident, forcing the Valvoline crew to withdraw. Parker Johnstone won the first IndyCar pole position for Honda. The start was aborted twice, due to improper alignment of the field, but the rookie polesitter was not at fault. Later on, championship leader Jacques Villeneuve came into the pitlane unexpectedly with wheel hub problems. Johnstone soon had the same issues, as did Maurício Gugelmin. This problem was thought to be limited to the Reynard cars, but this myth was dispelled when Bobby Rahal's Lola was similarly diagnosed.

Nearing halfway rookie Andre Ribeiro established himself as the car to beat, but after a routine pit stop his car failed to get up to race pace. He then retired with electrical issues. Polesitter Parker Johnstone also dropped out with brake failure, and 3rd place runner Eddie Cheever's gearbox quit. At Lap 194 Danny Sullivan's great career ended when he crashed in Turn 1. Lyn St. James, driving for Dick Simon, lost an engine while running in the Top 10 and Sullivan lost control in the oil. Bryan Herta struck a stray tyre from the accident, ending his day as well. Sullivan's injuries included a broken pelvis, and had to withdraw from the Brickyard 400 the following weekend. He later announced his retirement from auto racing (later becoming a driver analyst for ABC and ESPN's IndyCar coverage). Scott Pruett and Al Unser Jr. were alone in the lead lap and made their final scheduled stops during this long yellow flag.

The race resumed at Lap 207 with Unser beating Pruett out of the pitlane. Unser appeared to be out of contention at Lap 230 when he pitted with blistering on the right rear tyre, but he stayed in the lead lap and caught a lucky yellow thanks to an unfortunate Alessandro Zampedri, who crashed in Turn 4 at Lap 238. When the race restarted Unser, in his 200th IndyCar start, was flying through the field, and it was only a matter of time before he caught Patrick Racing's Pruett. The Californian barely led at the white flag as Unser swept around him, but he made great use of the draft and pulled the same move through Turns 3 and 4. At the pit entry Pruett had the lead and beat Unser by a carlength, giving Firestone Tires their first IndyCar win since the 1970s, and Patrick's first win since Nazareth in September of 1989 with Emerson Fittipaldi.

=== Mid-Ohio ===
Point leader Jacques Villeneuve set a new track record in qualifying; the eight such occurrence of the season. Al Unser Jr., starting in Row 4, came in during the parade laps with a flat tire. At the start Americans Eddie Cheever and Scott Pruett touched wheels and collected compatriot Parker Johnstone, who spun off in Turn 4 (the starts at Mid-Ohio take place on the backstretch, just after Turn 3). Johnstone's day was over before it started. A few laps later, Brazilians Raul Boesel and Andre Ribeiro received stop and go penalties for overtaking under the Turn 4 yellow, the site of Johnstone's accident. Through the first 20 laps only Michael Andretti could match the pace of polesitter Villeneuve, both men several seconds ahead of third placed Maurício Gugelmin. By this time, however, the wicker on Andretti's rear wing came loose, and ultimately the left side of the wicker flew off. But Andretti stayed on Villeneuve, apparently unaffected by the "wing change". Little Al made his first pit stop at Lap 23, a bit earlier than the leaders who were negotiating traffic. Pay drivers Hiro Matsushita, Eliseo Salazar, and Carlos Guerrero were not easy for Jacques and Michael to overtake. The duo pitted on Lap 29, with no position change, but Michael made a dramatic pass in Turn 7 (a part of the esses, or the "twisty bits", as they are also called at Mid-Ohio) to take the spot. The pass was not for the lead, however, because rookie Gil de Ferran stayed out for a few more laps on a light fuel load. De Ferran went from 5th to 3rd after his pit stops completed the first round of stops. Soon after pit stops second place Villeneuve reported braking problems, which was later diagnosed as a boiling problem on a very warm and humid day. Rookie Andre Ribeiro was soon very warm when he brought the Tasman car into the pits unscheduled; a fire developed in the rear of the car when the fuel vent stack stuck open allowing fuel to gush out and ignite on the exhaust. De Ferran took second from Villeneuve whose pace had slowed due to concern over the brakes. On Lap 39 Bobby Rahal, the crowd favorite who had moved up from 8th to 4th in the pit stops, tried Villeneuve on the outside of Turn 5. They touched wheels and Rahal was sent into the wall. Neither he nor the crowd were pleased with Villeneuve, who was given enough room according to Rahal. Al Unser Jr., off sequence with the leaders, pitted under the full course yellow.

After the restart rookie point leader Christian Fittipaldi jumped out in his pit stall with a fire in the back. 2nd placed de Ferran dropped out with engine failure, meaning that the top three rookies were all out of the race. Final stops began on Lap 54 when Robby Gordon brought the Walker Racing #5 car in. The air gun for the right front tire changer failed, adding nearly 30 seconds to the pit stop time. Robby expressed his displeasure over the radio to Derrick Walker, lamenting that their race had been thrown away. Leader Michael Andretti pitted with 24 laps to go, and did not lead again until Vileneuve, Paul Tracy, and Unser made their pit stops. Unser stretched his fuel to Lap 70; 14 laps to go. Typical of Roger Penske's strategic thinking, this pit sequence moved Unser up to second, behind Andretti and ahead of Andretti's teammate Tracy. Andretti's lead was unassailable with 4 laps to go, but he slowed with a broken header and could only sit forlornly in Turn 6, pondering what might have been. Despite the unusual pit strategy, Al Unser Jr. captured the win over Tracy, Villeneuve, Adrian Fernandez, and Bryan Herta.

=== Loudon ===
Andre Ribeiro won his first pole with a new track record. Adrian Fernandez crashed in Turn 2 on Lap 1 (he had crashed in Turn 3 in Friday practice). On Lap 42 Scott Pruett crashed in front of Michael Andretti, who took the lead during the pit stops. At halfway Paul Tracy was black flagged for an oil leak, and was prevented by CART officials from returning to the race, leaving the Canadian fuming. With three laps to go a battle for 20th went wrong as Marco Greco and Buddy Lazier (both 13 laps down) crashed, and the race ended under yellow. Indy Lights graduate Andre Ribeiro won his first IndyCar race; also the first for his team and for Honda.

=== Vancouver ===
Jacques Villeneuve won his fifth pole position of the year, setting yet another track record (which was no longer a surprise by this time of the season). The point for the pole was crucial for Villeneuve, who could eliminate Al Unser Jr. from championship contention, and thus become the 1995 champion. The start was clean, but in Turn 5 (a tight and tricky chicane) Unser tangled with rookie Gil de Ferran in a battle for 7th. Unser continued but de Ferran, who was on the outside, was flung into the air after wheel contact and struck the barrier. The red flag was issued and the first lap was nullified. De Ferran's team managed to prepare the backup car for the second start. The second attempt was aborted when Villeneuve jumped the green flag. The third start was the official start. Rookie leader Christian Fittipaldi slowed with a flat right rear tire after contact with uncle Emmo, who pitted for a new nosecone behind Villeneuve, Jimmy Vasser, Bobby Rahal, Scott Goodyear (in his third start of the year), and Michael Andretti. Vasser dropped out on Lap 7 with a broken header, moving Robby Gordon into the Top 5. At the same time Formula One veteran Domenico Schiattarella spun the Project Indy car in Turn 5, bringing out Johnny Rutherford in the safety car again. By Lap 20 the leaders had caught Hiro Matsushita, which compressed the Top 6 cars (Villeneuve, Rahal, Andretti, Gordon, Unser, and Teo Fabi). On lap 23 Andretti made one of his trademark bold passes in Turn 10 to get second from Rahal, and behind them Al Jr. passed Gordon. Rahal pitted on Lap 25, and the lead changed hands when Andretti repeated his Lap 23 pass on Villeneuve. The French-Canadian's loss of pace was because of a loss of grip, as he locked up tires and stepped the back end out on acceleration trying to keep second place ahead of Al Junior. He locked up the fronts in Turn 5, allowing Unser to set up a great exit and launch around Villeneuve, who dropped to 7th by Turn 8 and pitted on that lap, taking the harder compound of Goodyear Eagles. On Lap 39 Unser pitted and Teo Fabi spun the Forsythe car in Turn 5. He did not hit a wall or stall the engine, but leader Andretti took no chances and made his first pit stop.

At Lap 49 Andretti and Unser, the only former winners of the Molson Indy Vancouver, were in close proximity some 17 seconds ahead of third place Paul Tracy when the yellow was waved for Marco Greco, whose Galles Racing entry was stopped on the pit straight. After the restart Gil de Ferran, who had done very well in the early going to keep his backup car in 5th place, could not pass the lapped car of Carlos Guerrero. Behind him, Andre Ribeiro attempted to pass him on the pit straight, but running side by side through the first turn usually doesn't work, and Ribeiro clipped the wall with the right front and brought out the yellow again. Unser, who had set the fastest lap earlier, passed Andretti for the lead on Lap 60. It wasn't long before Andretti lost use of second gear, the culprit from Long Beach. Though Michael was no longer a threat to Unser's bid for the win, having dropped out of the race, Unser was getting fed up with Raul Boesel who was on the tail end of the lead lap. On Lap 66 Tracy made a pass on Bryan Herta for 3rd in Turn 3, but locked up the rear tires and collected Herta and 5th place Maurício Gugelmin, ending the Brazilian's day. With 20 laps to go, Jacques Villeneuve was running 5th behind Unser, Rahal, de Ferran, and Gordon, when he suddenly lost 5th and 6th gears. Scott Goodyear, one lap down, swerved to avoid hitting Villeneuve, and clipped him coming into the sweeping Turn 9. Goodyear nearly hit the tire barrier in Turn 10 as his left rear was flattened by Jacques' front wing. After Bobby Rahal pitted from 2nd, "Albuquerque Al" was unchallenged on his way to his 30th IndyCar win (pending the appeal from Portland) ahead of Gil de Ferran. Al would keep the championship fight alive if Team Penske won the appeal.

=== Laguna Seca ===
With the Portland appeal set to take place after the conclusion of the season, the championship was not entirely settled. Assuming Team Penske won the appeal, Al Unser Jr. still had a chance, but as long as point leader Jacques Villeneuve finished 8th or better, he would be the champion regardless of Unser's result. Jacques won his 6th pole of the season, with another track record and a precious championship point. Unser started a lowly 14th.

The full course yellow was displayed on the opening lap as Robby Gordon spun out of Turn 1 after a touch with Adrian Fernandez. As Villeneuve led from the start, his front rowmate Bryan Herta lost several positions before losing 5 laps in the pitlane with engine problems in Chip Ganassi Racing's final race with the Ford-Cosworth powerplants. A lap later Parker Johnstone spun and stalled in Turn 1, but the corner workers got him rolling again to avoid another safety car deployment. As Unser marched into the Top 10, Alessandro Zampedri spun his Dale Coyne Racing entry in Turn 11 and brought out the second full course caution. After maintaining the lead, Villeneuve pitted on Lap 29, followed by rookie Gil de Ferran and 1983 Laguna winner Teo Fabi one lap later. De Ferran's Jim Hall-led crew got the drop on Team Green, which was crucial for the Brazilian's slim chances of leapfrogging countryman Christian Fittipaldi for IndyCar Rookie of the Year. After trailing de Ferran for a few laps, Villeneuve suddenly made an unscheduled stop due to a slow puncture on the right front. This dropped him to 13th, over 35 seconds out of the lead, and about 25 seconds behind title rival Unser, who had climbed up to 6th after pitting a few laps early. Just beyond halfway, the order was de Ferran, Paul Tracy, Mauricio Gugelmin, Unser Jr, and Fabi.

At Lap 45, Villeneuve pitted a 3rd time, while the other leaders had yet to begin the second round of pit stops. The problem was the same as before: a slow right front puncture, but the culprit was the brake vent which had apparently been rubbing the tire. De Ferran pitted from the lead on Lap 54, maintaining his comfortable lead over Tracy after Gugelmin led briefly. Gordon found trouble again, this time in Turn 11 because of contact with backmarker Marco Greco; Gordon came in to replace a broken front wing, and Greco with a flailing left rear tire carcass. With Unser running 7th at the completion of scheduled pit stops, Villeneuve came in for a 4th stop to replace the front wing, with adjusted placement of the brake vents.

The final caution flag of the day was displayed with 20 laps to go when rookie Andre Ribeiro collided with the lapped car of Bryan Herta, sending the New Hampshire winner into the wall leading up to Turn 3. Rookie leader Christian Fittipaldi spun exiting Turn 5, retiring shortly afterwards and surrendering any opportunity to contest rookie honors with de Ferran controlling the race. De Ferran claimed Rookie of the Year by taking his first IndyCar win by 8 seconds over twice defending race winner Paul Tracy. Mauricio Gugelmin, Michael Andretti, and Scott Pruett completed the Top 5. Unser came home 6th, ahead of Bobby Rahal, Jimmy Vasser, Teo Fabi, and Adrian Fernandez on the lead lap. 11th place Jacques Villeneuve became the youngest national champion in the modern era at the age of 24, and the 2nd youngest in history (Louis Meyer was also 24 in 1928). The F1-bound French-Canadian was a lap down with Raul Boesel, who claimed the final point.

== See also ==
- 1995 Indianapolis 500
- 1995 Toyota Atlantic Championship season
- 1995 Indy Lights season
- 1995 Formula One season

== Bibliography ==
- Shaw, Jeremy, ed. (1995). Autocourse Indy Car 1995-96: Official Yearbook. Richmond, Surrey: Hazleton Publishing. ISBN 978-1-874557-51-7.
