= Lola T95/00 =

Racing car designed and built by Lola Cars

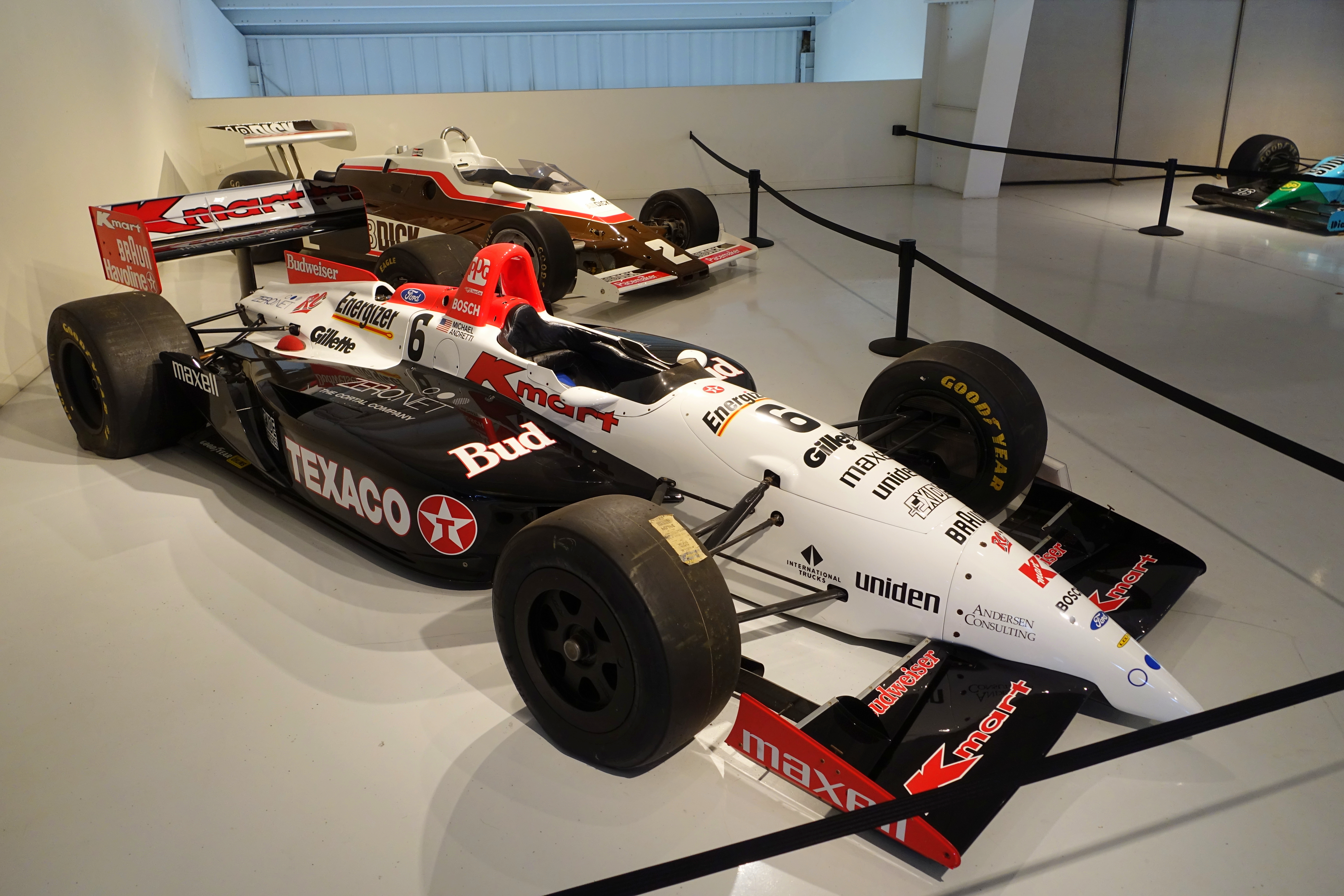
- Category: CART IndyCar; Indy Racing League
- Constructor: Lola
- Predecessor: Lola T94/00
- Successor: Lola T96/00

Technical specifications
- Length: 4,978 mm (196 in)
- Width: 2,032 mm (80 in)
- Height: 940 mm (37 in)
- Axle track: 1,753 mm (69 in) (Front); 1,638 mm (64 in) (Rear)
- Wheelbase: 3,048 mm (120 in)
- Engine: Ford/Cosworth XB; Mercedes-Benz IC108; Buick Indy V6; Menard Indy V6 2.65–3.43 L (2,650–3,430 cc; 162–209 cu in) mid-engined
- Transmission: 6-speed manual
- Weight: 1,550 lb (700 kg)
- Fuel: Methanol
- Tyres: Goodyear

Competition history
- Debut: 1995 Marlboro Grand Prix of Miami

The Lola T95/00 is an open-wheel racing car chassis, designed and built by Lola Cars that competed in the CART open-wheel racing series, for competition in the 1995 IndyCar season. It was slightly more competitive than its predecessors, managing to score four wins that season. It was mainly powered by the 800–850 hp (600–630 kW) Ford/Cosworth XB turbo engine, but also used the Mercedes-Benz IC108 engine, and the Buick/Menard V6 Indy engine.

It was also used by many teams in the inaugural 1996 Indy Racing League season and the first two races of the 1996-97 Indy Racing League season before that series changed to a totally new chassis and engine combination.
