= Reynard 95I =

Racing car designed and built by Reynard Racing Cars

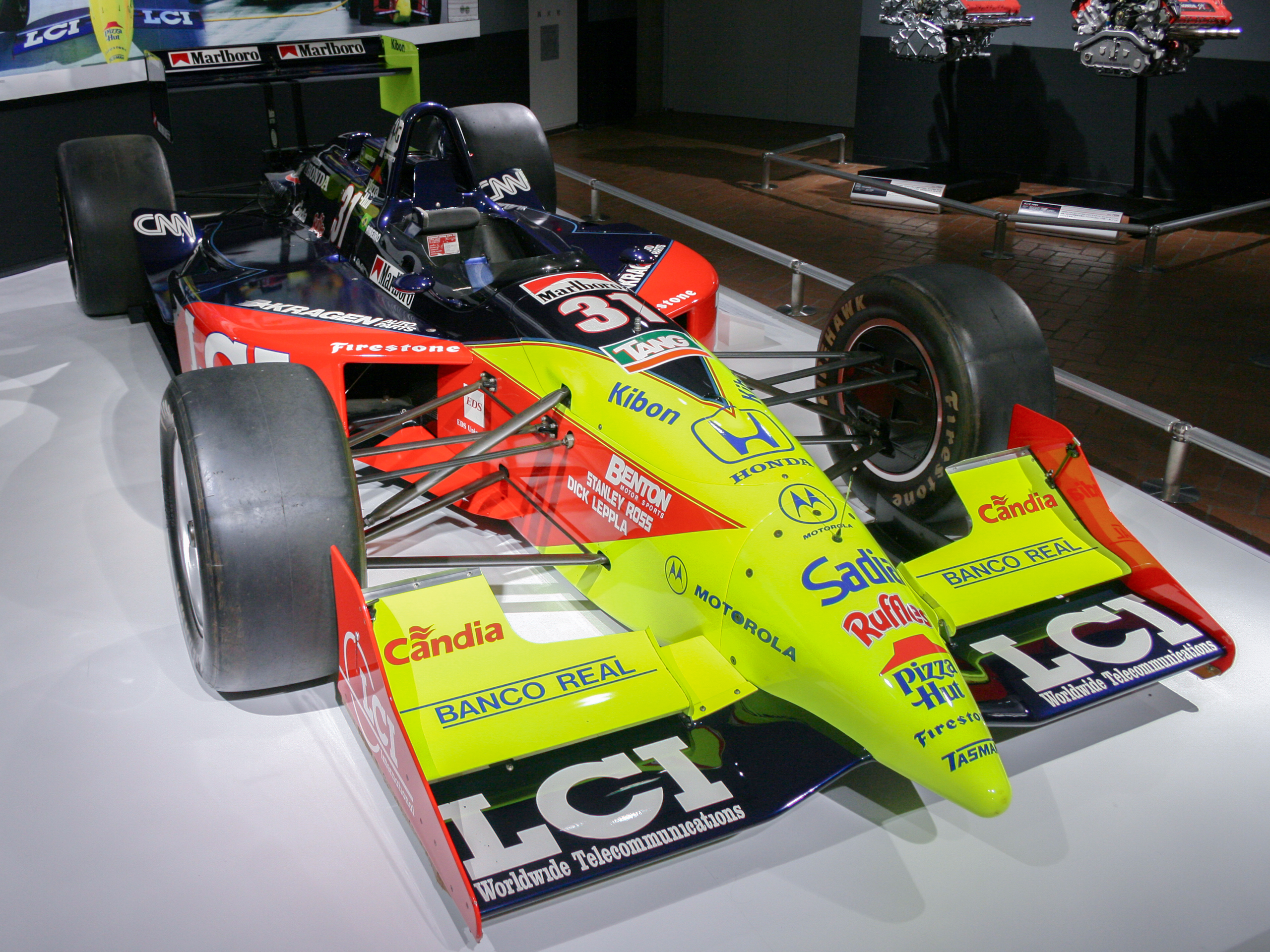
- Category: CART IndyCar
- Constructor: Reynard Racing Cars
- Designer: Malcolm Oastler
- Predecessor: Reynard 94I
- Successor: Reynard 96I

Technical specifications
- Engine: Honda Indy V8 turbo Ford/Cosworth XB; Mercedes-Benz IC108 2.65 L (2,650 cc; 162 cu in) V8 mid-engined
- Transmission: 6-speed sequential manual
- Weight: 1,550 lb (700 kg)
- Fuel: Methanol
- Tyres: Goodyear Eagle; Firestone

Competition history
- Debut: 1995 Grand Prix of Miami; Miami, Florida
Races	Wins	Poles	F/Laps
22	8	15	7
- Constructors' Championships: 1
- Drivers' Championships: 1

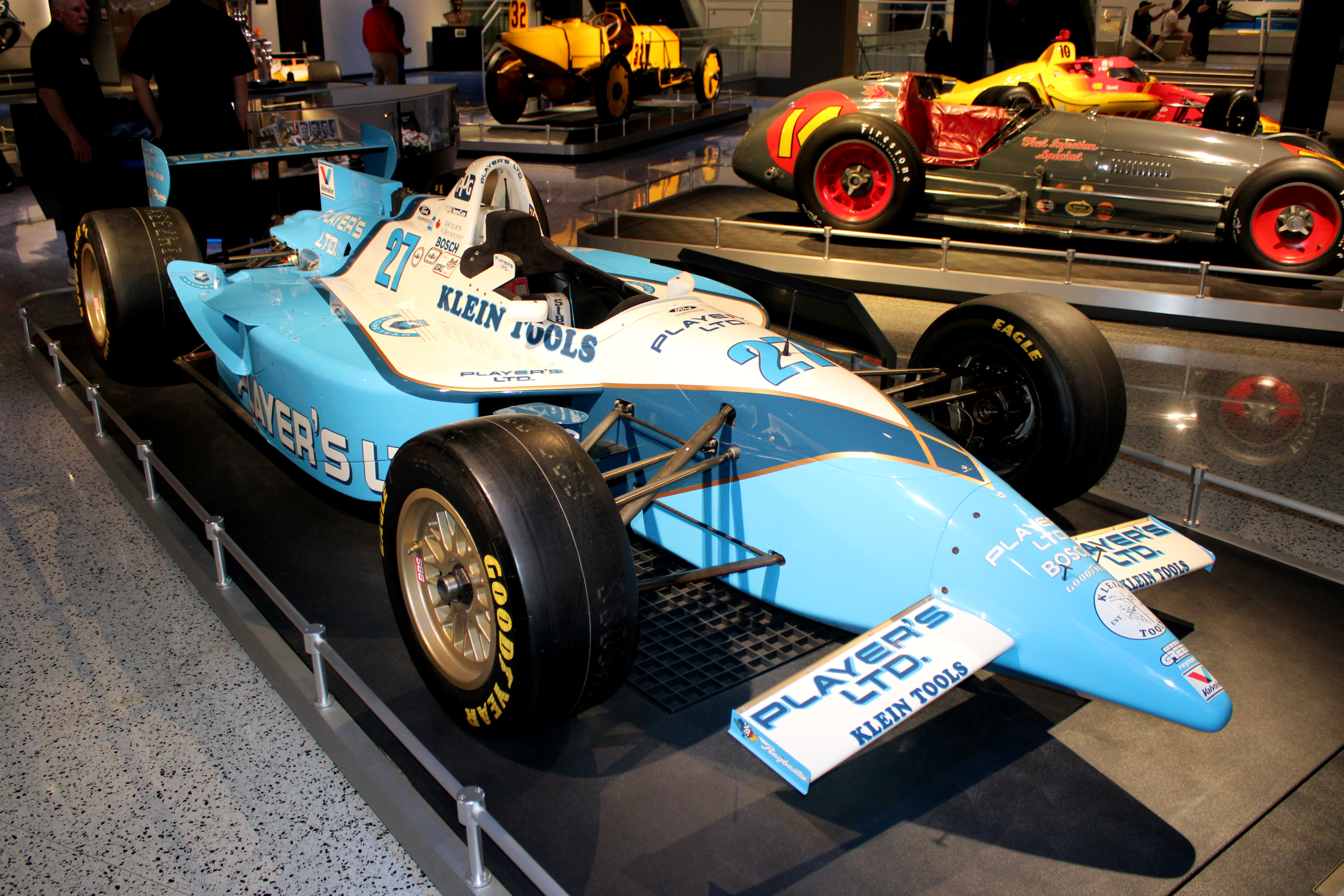
1995 Indianapolis 500-winning chassis of Jacques Villeneuve

The Reynard 95I is an open-wheel racing car designed and built by Reynard Racing Cars that competed in the 1995 and 1996 IndyCar seasons, notable for winning the first CART race it entered, and later going on to win the constructors' and drivers' titles later that year, being driven by Jacques Villeneuve. The car continued to be raced in the 1996 and 1996-97 Indy Racing League seasons.
