= Reynard 94I =

Racing car designed and built by Reynard Racing Cars

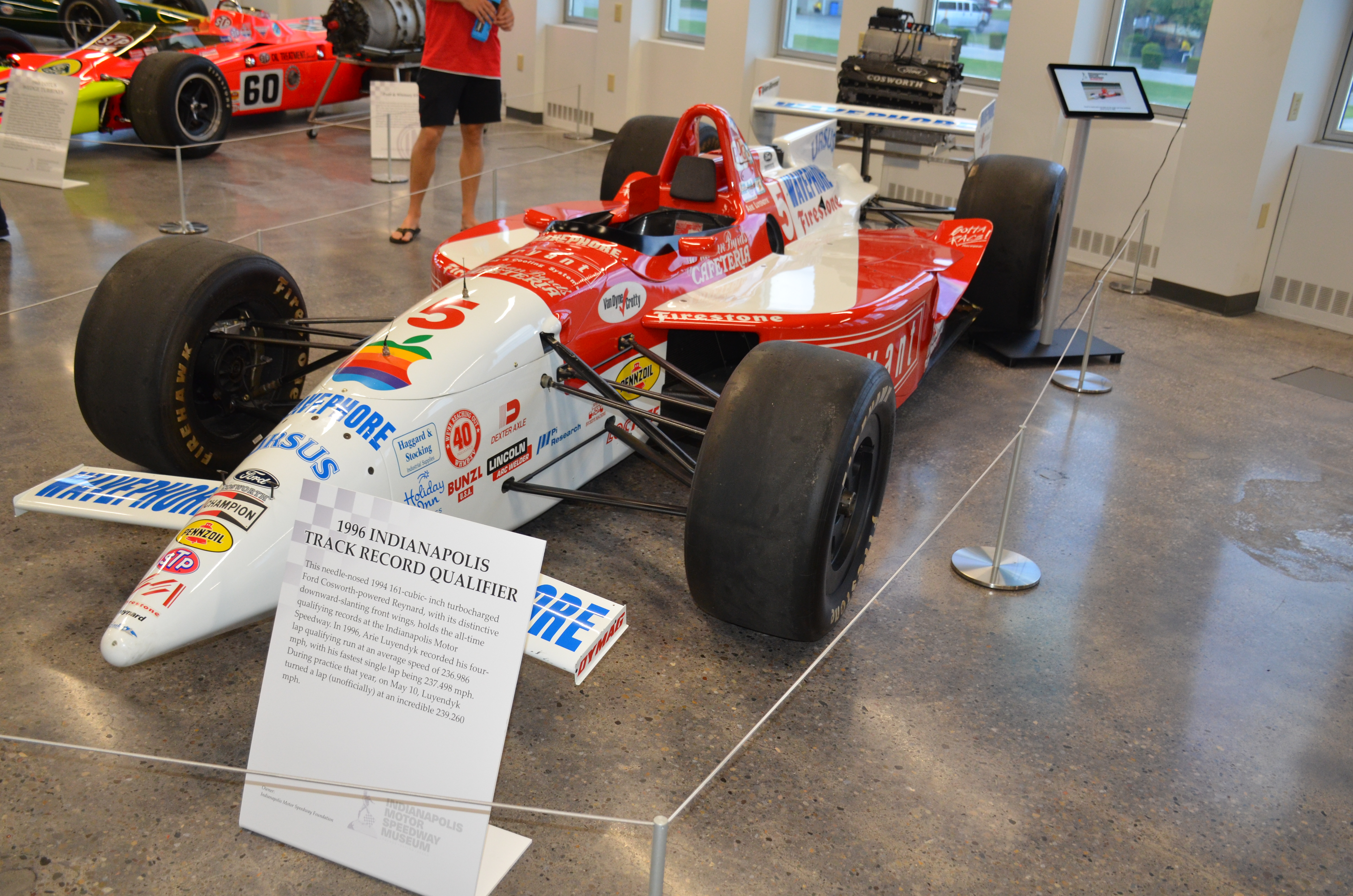
- Category: CART IndyCar
- Constructor: Reynard Racing Cars
- Designer: Malcolm Oastler
- Predecessor: none
- Successor: Reynard 95I

Technical specifications
- Engine: Ilmor Indy V8/D; Ford/Cosworth XB; Mercedes-Benz IC108 2.65 L (2,650 cc; 162 cu in) V8 mid-engined
- Transmission: 6-speed Manual
- Fuel: Methanol
- Tyres: Goodyear Eagle

Competition history
- Debut: 1994 Australian FAI Indycar Grand Prix; Surfers Paradise, Australia
Races	Wins	Poles
32	4	2

The Reynard 94I is an open-wheel racing car designed and built by Reynard Racing Cars. It competed in the 1994 and 1995 IndyCar seasons, notable for winning the first CART race it entered. The car continued to be raced in the 1996 and 1996-97 Indy Racing League seasons, and holds the unofficial and official lap records at the Indianapolis Motor Speedway.

== Development ==
The 94I project began in November 1992 with designer Malcolm Oastler. The car was intended to be "simple but soundly engineered, easy to tune and maintain, with a highly developed aerodynamic package." An unused design for the Galmer G93 sold to Reynard was used as a basis for the 94I. Bruce Ashmore, a former designer at Lola Cars, arrived late in the design process as the technical director, and provided input based on his experience with Indy cars.

The car featured elements from the company's F3000 cars, such as dynamic suspension shocks and a longitudinal gearbox (as opposed to the transverse gearbox seen on the rival Lola and Penske cars). Reynard also differentiated themselves by opening a technical base in Indianapolis and making its office and service staff accessible to customers, whereas the other manufacturers were still predominately located in England.

A total of 14 cars were built for the 1994 season at the company's location in Bicester, England.

== Racing history ==
During the 1994 season, the 94I was raced by Chip Ganassi Racing, Hayhoe Racing, Hall Racing, Galles Racing and Forsythe-Green Racing, and powered by the Ford-Cosworth XB and Ilmor/D engines. An additional 94I was raced at the 1994 Indianapolis 500 by Hemelgarn Racing. The car proved immediately competitive as Ganassi driver Michael Andretti won the first race of the season, held at Surfers Paradise, having started from 2nd place on the grid. Andretti would win again at Toronto later that year. Jacques Villeneuve, in his rookie season, also took his first win for Forsythe-Green at Road America. Despite these results, the teams noted that the 94I was too pitch-sensitive, which would be rectified in the following year's 95I.

The 94I continued to be used by smaller teams in 1995, one of its appeal being that the tub is the same as the 95I and the chassis could be updated to 1995 specifications. During the 1995 season, the 94I were used by Project Indy, Arciero-Wells, Pagan Racing and occasionally by Ganassi Racing. The 94I was also used by Stefan Johansson to qualify for the 1995 Indianapolis 500, when it became evident that his primary Penske chassis had trouble getting up to speed.

For 1996, the car saw competition in the first year of the Indy Racing League (comprising the 1996 season and the first portion of the 1996-97 season) as the league allowed all Indy cars that complied with the 1995 technical regulations. Hence, the grid featured multiple examples of the 94I chassis, mostly from Hemelgarn, Pagan and Treadway Racing (which was formed in conjunction with Project Indy). With engineer Tim Wardrop, Treadway Racing set up Arie Luyendyk's 94I to great effect; Luyendyk went on to set an all-time unofficial lap record of 239.260 mph at Indianapolis, a 1-lap record of 237.498 mph and a 4-lap record of 236.986 mph, all of which still stand as of the present day. The 94I ended the year with a pole and win at Phoenix and pole position at Las Vegas, both achieved by Luyendyk.

=== Complete Indy Car World Series results ===
(key) (Results in bold indicate pole position; results in italics indicate fastest lap)

Year	Entrant	Engine	Tyres	Driver	No.	1	2	3	4	5	6	7	8	9	10	11	12	13	14	15	16	17	Pts	D.C.
1994						SUR	PHX	LBH	INDY	MIL	DET	POR	CLE	TOR	MIC	MDO	LOU	VAN	ROA	NAZ	LAG			
1994	Chip Ganassi Racing	Ford/Cosworth XB	G	(United States) Michael Andretti	8	1*	20	6	6	4	5	31	18	1*	22	5	5	3	17	9	28		118	4th
1994	Chip Ganassi Racing	Ford/Cosworth XB	G	(Brazil) Maurício Gugelmin	88	6	15	7	11	15	8	30	8	20	15	25	14	5	19	10	22		39	16th
1994	Forsythe/Green Racing	Ford/Cosworth XB	G	(Canada) Jacques Villeneuve	12	17	25	15	2	9	7	6	4	9	20	9	26	24	1	7	3		94	6th
1994	Hall Racing	Ilmor Indy/D	G	(Italy) Teo Fabi	11	7	26	9	7	17	4	27	9	8	4	21	20	18	4	6	5		79	9th
1994	Galles Racing	Ilmor Indy/D	G	(Mexico) Adrián Fernández	7	13	10	8	28	16	23	10	7	13	23	6	8	22	5	21	7		46	13th
1994	Hayhoe Racing	Ford/Cosworth XB	G	(United States) Jimmy Vasser	18	4	5	24	4	11	20	32	31	25	25	14	7	15	28	13	26		42	15th
1994	Hemelgarn Racing	Ford/Cosworth XB	G	(United States) Stan Fox	91				13														0	37th
1995						MIA	SUR	PHX	LBH	NAZ	INDY	MIL	DET	POR	ROA	TOR	CLE	MIC	MDO	LOU	VAN	LAG		
1995	Arciero-Wells Racing	Ford/Cosworth XB	F	(Japan) Hiro Matsushita	25	26	11	22	19	DNQ													5^{1}	28th^{1}
1995	Pagan Racing	Mercedes-Benz IC108	G	(United States) Dennis Vitolo	21	18																	0	41st
1995	Pagan Racing	Mercedes-Benz IC108	G	(Colombia) Roberto Guerrero	21			16			12												1	33rd
1995	Bettenhausen Motorsports	Ford/Cosworth XB	G	(Sweden) Stefan Johansson	16						16												60^{2}	13th^{2}
1995	Chip Ganassi Racing	Ford/Cosworth XB	G	(United States) Bryan Herta	4		15					24											30^{3}	20th^{3}
1995	Project Indy	Ford/Cosworth XB	G	(United States) Buddy Lazier	64		21									15							0	35th
1995	Project Indy	Ford/Cosworth XB	G	(France) Franck Fréon	64				15														0	36th
1995	Project Indy	Ford/Cosworth XB	G	(United States) Johnny Parsons, Jr.	64						DNQ												0	NC
1995	Project Indy	Ford/Cosworth XB	G	(Germany) Christian Danner	64								22										6^{4}	25th^{4}
1995	Project Indy	Ford/Cosworth XB	G	(United States) Jeff Wood	64											Wth							0	NC
1995	Project Indy	Ford/Cosworth XB	G	(Austria) Hubert Stromberger	64										16		Wth		DNQ				0	38th
1995	Project Indy	Ford/Cosworth XB	G	(Italy) Domenico Schiattarella	64																18	21	0	40th

^{1} 2 points were scored with the Reynard 94I. The remaining points were scored with a Reynard 95I.
^{2} No points were scored with the Reynard 94I, which only ran at Indy. All points were scored with a Penske PC23
^{3} No points were scored with the Reynard 94I. All points were scored with a Reynard 95I.
^{4} No points were scored with the Reynard 94I. Danner scored 6 points with a Lola T93/00.

=== Complete Indy Racing League results ===
(key) (Results in bold indicate pole position; results in italics indicate fastest lap)

Year	Entrant	Engine	Tyres	Driver	No.	1	2	3	4	5	6	7	8	9	10	Pts	D.C.
1996						WDW	PHX	INDY									
1996	Pagan Racing	Ford/Cosworth XB	G	(Colombia) Roberto Guerrero	21	5	16									237^{1}	4th^{1}
1996	Treadway Racing	Ford/Cosworth XB	F	(Netherlands) Arie Luyendyk	5		**1***	16								225^{1}	7th^{1}
1996	Hemelgarn	Ford/Cosworth XB	F	(United States) Brad Murphey	10			23								12	34th
1996-97						NH1	LV1	WDW	PHX	INDY	TXS	PIK	CMS	NH2	LV2		
1996-97	Treadway Racing	Ford/Cosworth XB	F	(Netherlands) Arie Luyendyk	5		**20**									223^{1}	6th^{1}
1996-97	Treadway Racing	Ford/Cosworth XB	F	(United States) Johnny O'Connell	35		12									23	40th
1996-97	Hemelgarn	Ford/Cosworth XB	F	(United States) Brad Murphey	9	18	27									25	38th

^{1} Points include results scored with another chassis.
