= Honda turbocharged Indy V8 engine =

Automobile engine

Honda turbocharged Indy V-8 engine
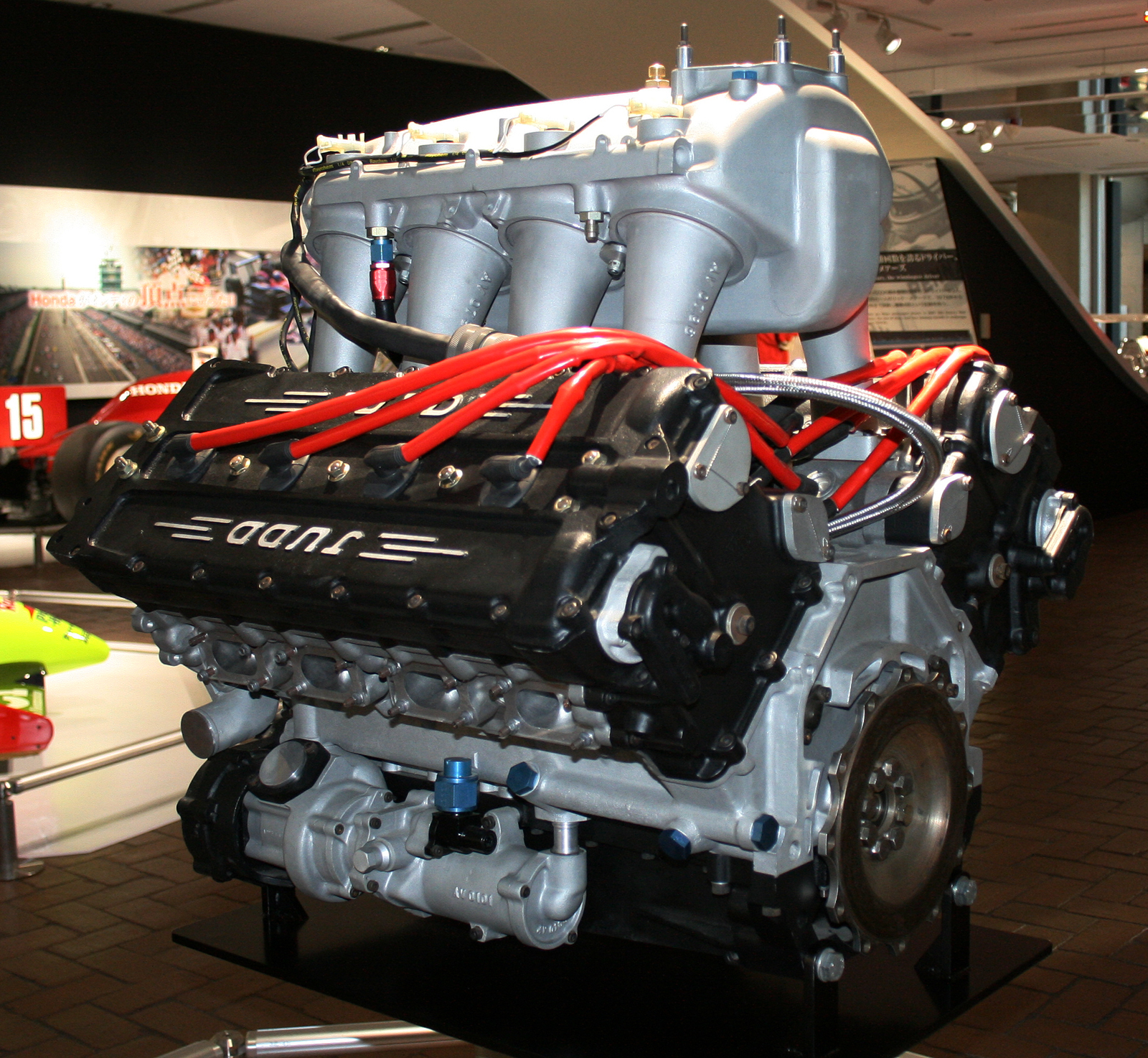

Overview
- Manufacturer: Honda-Judd
- Production: 1985–2002

Layout
- Configuration: 90° V-8
- Displacement: 2.65 L (162 cu in)
- Cylinder bore: 92 mm (3.6 in)
- Piston stroke: 49.7 mm (2 in)
- Valvetrain: 32-valve, DOHC, four-valves per cylinder

Combustion
- Turbocharger: Honda
- Fuel system: Mechanical multi-point fuel injection
- Fuel type: Methanol
- Oil system: Dry sump

Output
- Power output: 740–850 hp (552–634 kW)
- Torque output: 338–354 lb⋅ft (458–480 N⋅m)

Chronology
- Successor: Honda Indy V8 (2003–2011)

The Honda turbocharged Indy V8 engine is a single-turbocharged, 2.65-liter, V-8 Indy car racing engine, originally designed, developed and produced by Honda, in partnership with Judd, for use in the CART championship series between 1986 and 2002.

== Background ==
As a result of Jack Brabham's long-standing relationship with Honda, Judd was hired by them to develop an engine for the company's return to Formula Two in association with Ron Tauranac's Ralt team.

After the demise of Formula Two at the end of the 1984 season, Judd continued to develop new engines for Honda. The first was the Judd AV, a turbocharged V8 engine built for Honda's CART campaign. It was first used on the CART circuit midway through the 1986 season, fielded by Galles Racing and driver Geoff Brabham. It was initially badged as the Brabham-Honda, and scored a fourth-place finish at the 1986 Michigan 500. In 1987, the engine was used for the first time at the Indianapolis 500. Brabham scored second-place finishes in 1987 at Pocono and Road America, as well as a third at the season finale at Miami.

The engine became known for its reliability and superior fuel mileage (particularly in the 500-mile races). However, it was at a decided power disadvantage compared to the top engine of the time, the Ilmor Chevrolet.

In 1988, Truesports with driver Bobby Rahal took over as the primary team, and the "Honda" name was dropped from the powerplant. During the 1988 season.

== Applications ==
- Lola T86/00
- March 87C
- Lola T9400
- Reynard 95I
- Reynard 96I
- Lola T96/00
- Reynard 97I
- Lola T97/00
- Reynard 98I
- Reynard 99I
- Reynard 2KI
- Reynard 01I
- Reynard 02I
- Lola B02/00
