= 1990 Champ Car season =

The 1990 Champ Car season may refer to:

- the 1989–90 USAC Championship Car season, which was just one race, the 74th Indianapolis 500
- the 1990 CART PPG Indy Car World Series, sanctioned by CART, who later became Champ Car
