= 1989 Champ Car season =

The 1989 Champ Car season may refer to:

- the 1988–89 USAC Championship Car season, which was just one race, the 73rd Indianapolis 500
- the 1989 CART PPG Indy Car World Series, sanctioned by CART, who would later become Champ Car
