= Alfa Romeo Indy V8 engine =

Alfa Romeo Indy V8
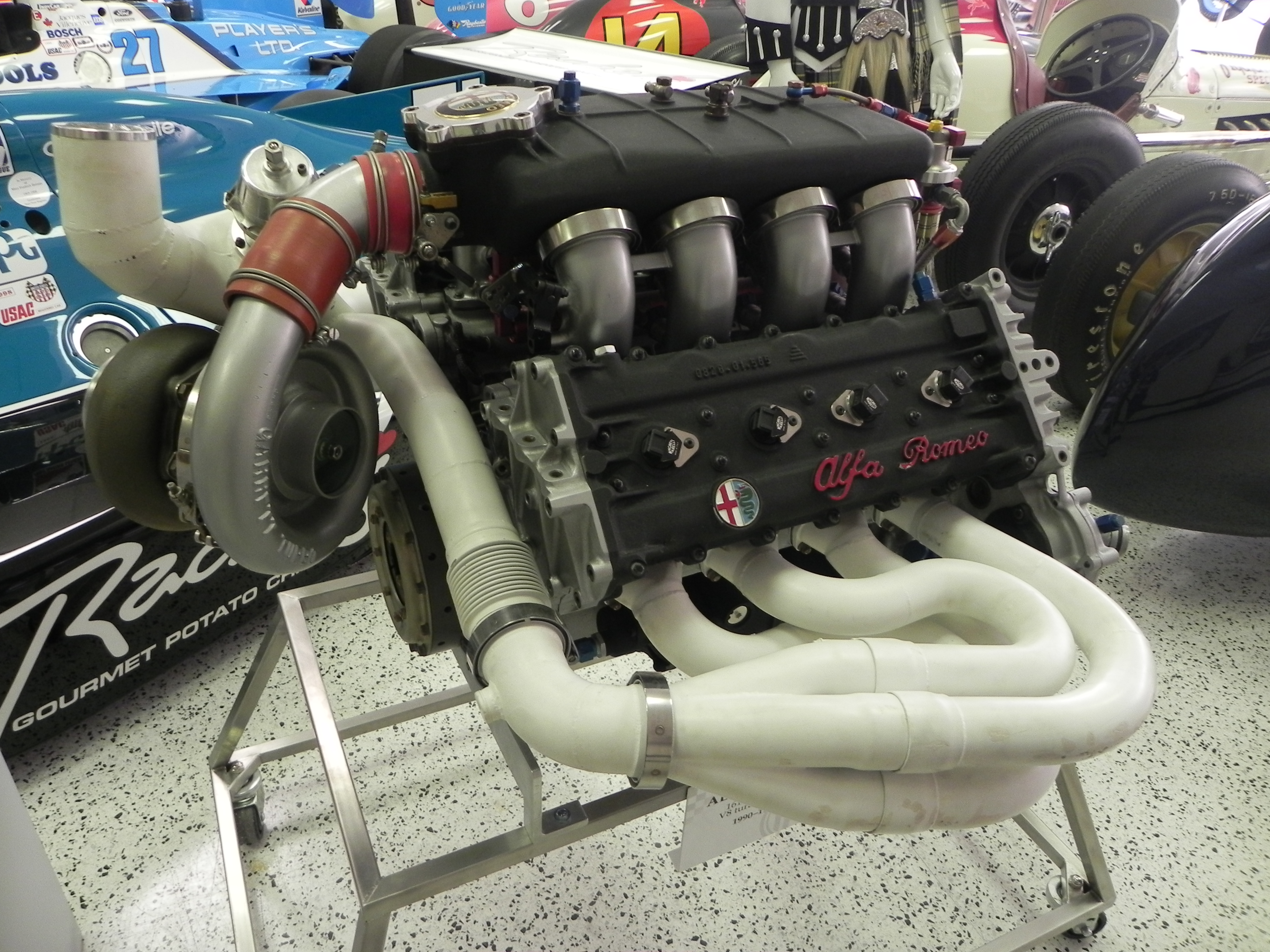

Overview
- Manufacturer: Alfa Lancia Industriale
- Production: 1989–1991

Layout
- Configuration: 90° V8
- Displacement: 2.65 L (162 cu in)
- Cylinder bore: 86 mm (3.39 in)
- Piston stroke: 57 mm (2.24 in)
- Valvetrain: 32-valve, DOHC, four-valves per cylinder
- Compression ratio: 11:1

Combustion
- Turbocharger: Yes
- Fuel system: Mechanical multi-point fuel injection
- Fuel type: Methanol
- Oil system: Dry sump

Output
- Power output: 680–720 hp (507–537 kW)
- Torque output: 400 lb⋅ft (542 N⋅m)

The Alfa Romeo Indy V8 engine is a turbocharged, 2.65-liter, Indy car racing engine, designed and built by Alfa Romeo, for use in the CART PPG Indy Car World Series; between 1989 and 1991. The engine was used in March and Lola car chassis.

== History ==
The Alfa Romeo engine was first campaigned in 1989 by Alex Morales Motorsports with Roberto Guerrero driving. The engine, however, was not ready for the start of the season, and the team missed the first four races, including that year's Indianapolis 500. The engine debuted at the Detroit street circuit, where Guerrero finished eighth. The team saw limited success the remainder of the season, recording only one more points finish and ultimately finishing 23rd in the driver's standings with only 6 total points.

For 1990, Patrick Racing took over the Alfa Romeo engine project, retaining Guerrero's services as driver while also signing Al Unser to a second car for Indianapolis and Michigan. Results were slightly better, with Guerrero scoring a season-high fifth at Toronto, but ultimately the engine proved uncompetitive on most circuits and Guerrero only finish 16th in points. For 1991, Danny Sullivan was enlisted as the primary driver for the program, with Guerrero being moved to a part-time schedule. Sullivan managed several top 10 finishes with the Alfa Romeo engine, but it remained a non-factor for race victories. Sullivan would finish 11th in points. During the 1991 season, rumors arose that Patrick Racing had acquired an Ilmor-Chevrolet engine - the dominant IndyCar engine of the time - and sent it to Alfa Romeo to aid development of Alfa's IndyCar engine. With potential legal action coming from Ilmor over this move, Patrick Racing sold their assets to Bobby Rahal, who they had originally signed to be a driver, prior to 1992. By this point, the original contract Patrick Racing had with Alfa Romeo had expired, and the new Rahal-Hogan Racing team chose to secure a lease for Ilmor-Chevrolet engines instead, thereby ending the use of the Alfa Romeo IndyCar engine.

When Alfa Romeo unveiled their (unrelated) 2.65-liter IndyCar engine, it was in the back of a March chassis; however, it was also seen testing at Fiorano Circuit in the unraced 637 chassis.

== Applications ==
- March 89CE-March 90CE
- Lola T90/00
- Lola T91/00
