= Joe Sposato =

American racing driver

Joe Sposato (born May 25, 1949) is an American former racing driver from Ridgefield, Connecticut. He started his professional career in the Canadian Formula Atlantic series in the mid-1980s where he was fairly successful. He entered the CART Championship Car races at Laguna Seca Raceway in 1989 and 1990 in a Dick Simon Racing entry.

In 1989, Soosato failed to qualify for the race, but in 1990 he started 27th and finished the race 17th. That was his only Champ Car start. He later drove in the SCCA North American Toyota Atlantic series from 1992 to 1999, making 42 starts, although never more than seven starts in a single year (1992). His best Atlantic series finish was 4th place at Long Beach in 1994. He also had his best points result that year, 19th, despite only making three starts. In 2008, he has re-entered racing in the IMSA Porsche Cup series finishing 14th in Montreal and Mid-Ohio.

== CART ==
| Year | Team | 1 | 2 | 3 | 4 | 5 | 6 | 7 | 8 | 9 | 10 | 11 | 12 | 13 | 14 | 15 | 16 | Rank | Points | Ref |
|---|---|---|---|---|---|---|---|---|---|---|---|---|---|---|---|---|---|---|---|---|
| 1989 | Stoops Racing | PHX | LBH | INDY | MIL | DET | POR | CLE | MEA | TOR | MIS | POC | MDO | ROA | NAZ | LAG; DNQ | | NR | - | |
| 1990 | Dick Simon Racing | PHX | LBH | INDY | MIL | DET | POR | CLE | MEA | TOR | MIS | DEN | VAN | MDO | ROA | NAZ | LAG; 17 | 39th | 0 | |
