= Tero Palmroth =

Finnish racing driver

Tero Pentti Palmroth (born 28 May 1953, Tampere, Finland) is a Finnish former racing driver who competed in the CART series. He raced in the 1988–1992 seasons with twelve career starts, including the 1988–1991 Indianapolis 500. His best CART finish was in 12th position at the 1990 Indianapolis 500.

== Racing career results ==
=== PPG Indycar Series ===
(key) (Races in bold indicate pole position)

Year	Team	1	2	3	4	5	6	7	8	9	10	11	12	13	14	15	16	17	Rank	Points	Ref
1988	Dick Simon Racing	PHX	LBH	INDY; 19	MIL	POR; 18	CLE	TOR	MEA	MCH	POC	MDO	ROA	NAZ	LAG	MIA			**42nd**	**0**	
1989	Gohr Racing	PHX	LBH; 16	INDY; 16	MIL														**43rd**	**0**	
1989	Hemelgarn Racing					DET; 27	POR	CLE	MEA	TOR	MCH								**43rd**	**0**	
1989	Euromotorsport											POC; 25	MDO	ROA	NAZ	LAG			**43rd**	**0**	
1990	Dick Simon Racing	PHX	LBH	INDY; 12	MIL	DET; 28	POR	CLE	MEA; 27	TOR	MCH; DNS	DEN	VAN	MDO	ROA	NAZ	LAG		**33rd**	**1**	
1991	Paragon Racing	SRF	LBH	PHX	INDY; 23	MIL	DET	POR	CLE	MEA	TOR	MCH	DEN	VAN	MDO	ROA	NAZ	LAG	**48th**	**0**	
1992	Walker Motorsport	SRF	PHX; DNQ	LBH	INDY	DET	POR	MIL	NHA	TOR	MCH								**58th**	**0**	
1992	Euromotorsport											CLE; 26	ROA	VAN	MDO	NAZ			**58th**	**0**	
1992	Team Losi																LAG; 28		**58th**	**0**	
1994	Dick Simon Racing	SRF	PHX	LBH	INDY; DNQ	MIL	DET	POR	CLE	TOR	MCH	MDO	NHA	VAN	ROA	NAZ	LAG		NC	-	
1995	Dick Simon Racing	MIA	SRF	PHX	LBH	NAZ	INDY; DNQ	MIL	DET	POR	ROA	TOR	CLE	MCH	MDO	NHA	VAN	LAG	NC	-	

=== Indy 500 results ===
Year	Chassis	Engine	Start	Finish
1988	Lola	Cosworth	25th	19th
1989	Lola	Cosworth	16th	16th
1990	Lola	Cosworth	16th	12th
1991	Lola	Cosworth	26th	23rd
1994	Lola	Ford-Cosworth	Did not qualify	
1995	Lola	Buick	Did not qualify	
