= Tom Phillips (racing driver) =

American racing driver

Tom Phillips (born February 5, 1958) is an American former racing driver from Portland, Oregon. He finished in fifth place in the 1986 WCAR/SCCA Pro Formula Atlantic Championship with wins at Laguna Seca Raceway and the Tacoma Dome course. He made his CART Championship Car debut in October of that year at Laguna Seca in the No. 23 Dick Simon Racing Lola-Cosworth but was knocked out of the race after eight laps due to engine trouble after qualifying 20th. The race would be his only CART appearance.

== Racing record ==
=== American open-wheel racing ===
(key)

==== Indy Car World Series ====
| Year | Team | 1 | 2 | 3 | 4 | 5 | 6 | 7 | 8 | 9 | 10 | 11 | 12 | 13 | 14 | 15 | 16 | 17 | Rank | Points | Ref |
|---|---|---|---|---|---|---|---|---|---|---|---|---|---|---|---|---|---|---|---|---|---|
| 1986 | Dick Simon Racing | PHX | LBH | INDY | MIL | POR | MEA | CLE | TOR | MIS | POC | MDO | SAN | MIS2 | ROA | LAG; 24 | PHX2 | MIA | 46th | 0 | |
