= Scott Brayton =

American open-wheel racing driver

- Born: Scott Everts Brayton; February 20, 1959 Coldwater, Michigan, U.S.
- Died: May 17, 1996 (aged 37) Speedway, Indiana, U.S.
- Relatives: Lee Brayton (father)

CART IndyCar World Series
- Years active: 1981–1996
- Teams: Brayton Racing; Hemelgarn Racing; Dick Simon Racing; Team Menard
- Starts: 147
- Wins: 0
- Poles: 2
- Best finish: 12th in 1991

Previous series
- 1996: Indy Racing League

Scott Everts Brayton (February 20, 1959 – May 17, 1996) was an American race car driver on the American open-wheel circuit. He competed in 14 Indianapolis 500s, beginning with the 1981 event. Brayton was killed in practice after qualifying in pole position for the 1996 race.

== Career ==
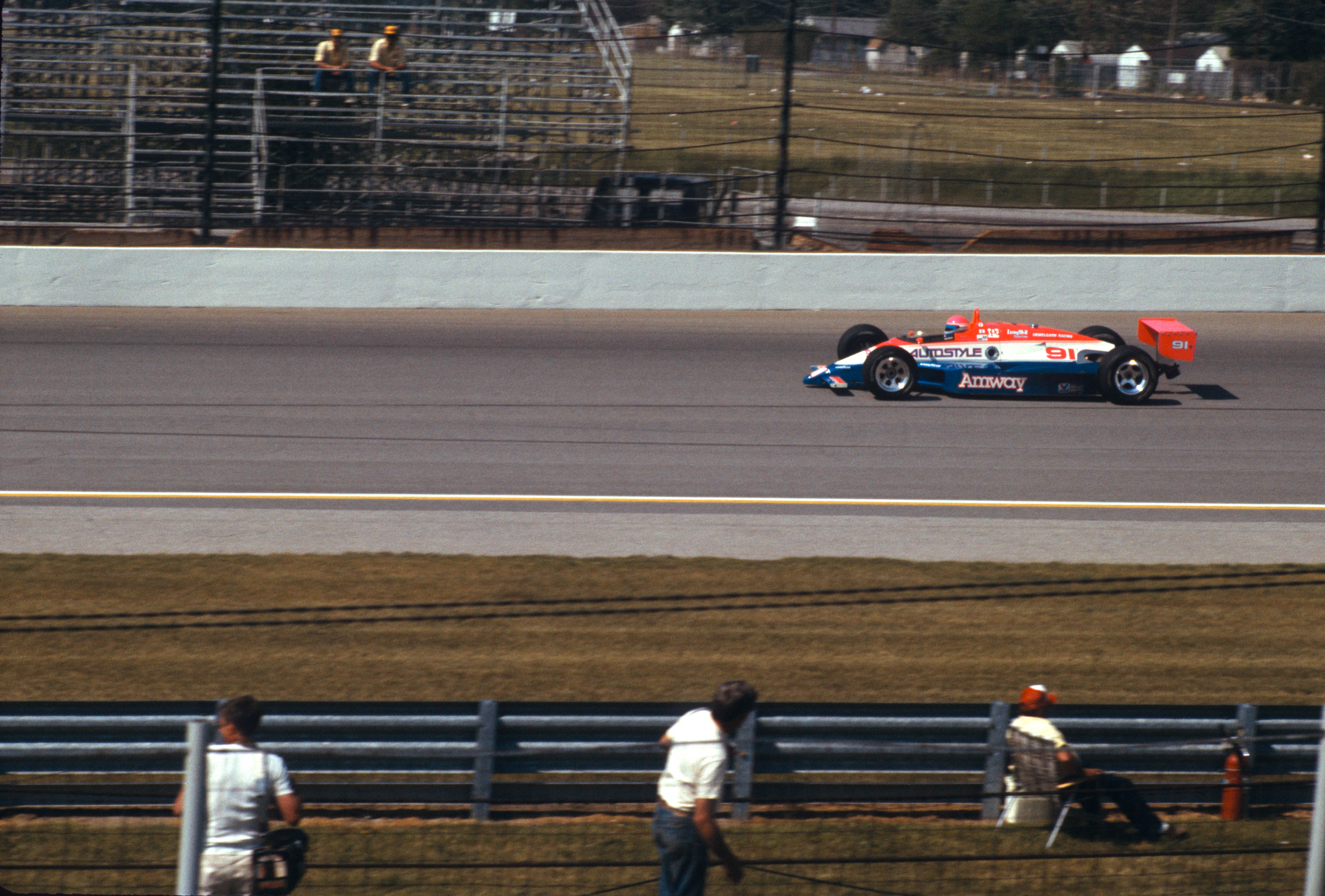
Brayton during qualifying for the 1987 Indianapolis 500

During the mid-1980s, Brayton helped introduce the Buick stock-block V-6 engine to Indianapolis. His father's firm, Brayton Engineering, was a major developer of the race engine. In 1985, he qualified second and set the one-lap Indianapolis Motor Speedway track record in the process. He dropped out early and finished thirtieth when the engine expired. He would not finish the race again until 1989, when he scored his best finish at the Speedway, sixth place but seven laps down. He would equal this finishing position in 1993, driving a Lola-Cosworth for Dick Simon Racing.

When Buick pulled out of IndyCar racing in 1993, John Menard Jr. continued developing the engine, now badged as the Menard V-6. Brayton, now without a regular ride in the CART IndyCar series, joined the Indy-only Menards team in 1994. Their belief in the powerplant paid off when Brayton won his first Indy 500 pole position in 1995, at an average speed of 231.604 mph (372.731 km/h). Turbocharger boost and pop-off valve problems relegated him to a seventeenth place finish.

Brayton was prepared to make his NASCAR debut at the 1995 Brickyard 400. However, he crashed his car during a private test session, and suffered a broken ankle and a concussion.

In 1996, Indianapolis Motor Speedway owner Tony George established the Indy Racing League, and Team Menard signed up to compete in their first full season of IndyCar racing. Because the majority of the established teams and drivers of open-wheel racing competed in the rival CART series, Brayton (and rookie teammate Tony Stewart) were considered legitimate contenders for the IRL title. After a bad start to the season, Brayton asserted his competitiveness by winning his second Indy pole after a dramatic qualifying session in which he withdrew an already-qualified car to get a second chance at taking the top spot.

=== Death ===
Brayton was making a practice run on May 17 in his backup car when a tire blew going into turn two. The car spun, scrubbed off almost no speed while sliding across the track and hit the outside retaining wall at more than 230 mph (370 km/h). Brayton was killed instantly from a basilar skull fracture by the severe impact. His funeral, held in his hometown of Coldwater, Michigan, was attended by a large contingent of drivers and racing personalities.

Teammate Tony Stewart, who qualified second, took over the pole starting position. A substitute driver, Danny Ongais, took over the car with which Brayton had qualified for the pole, and finished seventh.

== Personal life ==
Brayton began dating his future wife, Becky, in 1981 and an 11-year courtship followed. The couple had a daughter, Carly, who was two years old at the time of Brayton's death.

On Easter Sunday 1999, Becky married another IRL driver, Robbie Buhl, who would later become a partner in Dreyer & Reinbold Racing.

== Memorial Street Circuit ==
A street course in Grand Rapids, Michigan, used for SCCA racing was known as the Scott Brayton Memorial Street Circuit. It was used for the West Michigan Grand Prix in 1998 and 1999, after which the event folded.

== Scott Brayton Driver's Trophy ==
Following Brayton's death, the Indianapolis Motor Speedway announced a new trophy for the Indianapolis 500 dedicated to the driver who best exemplifies the attitude, spirit and competitive drive of Brayton. A driver could only be awarded the trophy once in his/her Indy career. It was awarded through 2009.

Year	Winner
1997	John Paul Jr.
1998	Roberto Guerrero
1999	Eliseo Salazar
2000	Eddie Cheever
2001	Davey Hamilton
2002	Arie Luyendyk
2003	Buddy Lazier
2004	Hélio Castroneves
2005	Kenny Bräck
2006	Sam Hornish Jr.
2007	Tony Kanaan
2008	Vítor Meira
2009	Sarah Fisher

== Racing record ==
=== American open-wheel racing results ===
(key) (Races in bold indicate pole position)

==== PPG Indycar World Series ====
(key) (Races in bold indicate pole position)

Year	Team	1	2	3	4	5	6	7	8	9	10	11	12	13	14	15	16	17	Rank	Points	Ref
1981	Brayton Racing	PHX; 15	MIL; 11	ATL; 9	ATL; 10	MCH; 7	RIV; 8	MIL; 21	MCH; 24	WGL; 20	MEX; 23	PHX; DNQ							13th	57	
1982	Brayton Racing	PHX; 14	ATL	MIL; 14	CLE	MCH; 11	MIL	POC; 24	RIV	ROA	MCH; 10	PHX							33rd	11	
1983	Brayton Racing	ATL	INDY; 9	MIL	CLE; 24	MCH; 12	ROA	POC; 28	RIV	MDO	MCH; 13	CPL; 26	LAG	PHX					24th	5	
1984	Brayton Racing	LBH	PHX	INDY; 18	MIL; 22	POR; 25	MEA; 14	CLE; 11	MCH; 13	ROA; 12	POC; 6	MDO; 12	SAN; 11	MCH; DNS	PHX; 23	LAG; 15	CPL; 8		23rd	19	
1985	Brayton Racing	LBH; 11	INDY; 30	MIL; DNQ	POR; 6	MEA; 15	CLE; 25	MCH; 8	ROA	POC; 16	MDO	SAN	MCH; 22						22nd	15	
1985	Hemelgarn Racing													LAG; 26	PHX; 18	MIA; DNQ			22nd	15	
1986	Hemelgarn Racing	PHX; 24	LBH	INDY; 30	MIL	POR	MEA	CLE	TOR	MCH; 13	POC; 27	MDO	SAN	MCH; 19	ROA	LAG	PHX	MIA	NC	0	
1987	Hemelgarn Racing	LBH	PHX	INDY; 12	MIL	POR; 5	MEA; 10	CLE	TOR	MCH; 22	POC; 25	ROA	MDO	NAZ	LAG	MIA			22nd	14	
1988	Hemelgarn Racing	PHX; 15	LBH; 23	INDY; 31	MIL; 10	POR; 9	CLE; 16	TOR; 14	MEA; 11	MCH; 26	POC; 10	MDO	ROA	NAZ; 18	LAG	MIA; 24			23rd	12	
1989	Dick Simon Racing	PHX; 15	LBH; 12	INDY; 6	MIL; 18	DET; DNQ	POR; 13	CLE; 28	MEA; 10	TOR; 14	MCH; 11	POC; 14	MDO; 15	ROA; 13	NAZ; 10	LAG; 20			15th	17	
1990	Dick Simon Racing	PHX; 13	LBH; 9	INDY; 7	MIL; 20	DET; 10	POR; 25	CLE; 22	MEA; 9	TOR; 14	MCH; 16	DEN; 12	VAN; 9	MDO; 8	ROA; 13	NAZ; 12	LAG; 24		15th	28	
1991	Dick Simon Racing	SRF; 6	LBH; 8	PHX; 13	INDY; 17	MIL; 6	DET; 9	POR; 15	CLE; 7	MEA; 9	TOR; 6	MCH; 9	DEN; 16	VAN; 10	MDO; 13	ROA; 11	NAZ; 19	LAG; 27	12th	52	
1992	Dick Simon Racing	SRF; 20	PHX; 9	LBH; 17	INDY; 22	DET; 12	POR; 22	MIL; 3	NHA; 17	TOR; 17	MCH; 10	CLE; 21	ROA; 12	VAN; 8	MDO; 10	NAZ; 8	LAG; 10		15th	39	
1993	Dick Simon Racing	SRF; 16	PHX; 25	LBH; 24	INDY; 6	MIL; 6	DET; 14	POR; 17	CLE; 18	TOR; 19	MCH; 11	NHA; 6	ROA; 7	VAN; 24	MDO; 9	NAZ; 15	LAG; 24		15th	36	
1994	Team Menard	SRF	PHX	LBH	INDY; 20	MIL	DET	POR	CLE	TOR	MCH	MDO	NHA	VAN	ROA	NAZ	LAG		49th	0	
1995	Team Menard	MIA	SRF	PHX	LBH	NAZ	**INDY**; 17	MIL	DET	POR	ROA	TOR	CLE	MCH	MDO	NHA	VAN	LAG	34th	1	

==== Indy Racing League ====
Year	Team	Chassis	Engine	1	2	3	Rank	Points	Ref
1996	Team Menard	Lola T95/00	Menard	WDW; 15	PHX; 18	**INDY**; DNS	**18th**	**111**	

==== Indianapolis 500 ====
Year	Chassis	Engine	Start	Finish	Team
1981	Penske PC-6	Cosworth DFX	29	16	Brayton Racing
1982	Penske PC-7	Cosworth DFX	DNQ		Brayton Racing
1983	March 83C	Cosworth DFX	29	9	Brayton Racing
1984	March 84C	Buick V6	26	18	Brayton Racing
1985	March 85C	Buick V6	2	30	Brayton Racing
1986	March 86C	Buick V6	23	30	Hemelgarn Racing
1987	March 87C	Cosworth DFX	13	12	Hemelgarn Racing
1988	Lola T88/00	Buick V6	7	31	Hemelgarn Racing
1989	Lola T89/00	Buick V6	6	6	Dick Simon Racing
1990	Lola T90/00	Cosworth DFS	26	7	Dick Simon Racing
1991	Lola T91/00	Chevrolet 265A	19	17	Dick Simon Racing
1992	Lola T92/00	Buick V6	7	22	Dick Simon Racing
1993	Lola T93/00	Ford-Cosworth XB	11	6	Dick Simon Racing
1994	Lola T93/00	Menard-Buick V6	23	20	Team Menard
1995	Lola T95/00	Menard-Buick V6	**1**	17	Team Menard
1996	Lola T95/00	Menard-Buick V6	**1**	DNS^{‡}	Team Menard

^{‡} For the 1996 Indianapolis 500, Brayton qualified on the pole. The following Friday he was fatally injured driving a back-up car during practice. In the race Danny Ongais drove the pole car from the back of the field and finished seventh.

== See also ==
- List of Indianapolis Motor Speedway fatalities
