= Dick Simon Racing =

IndyCar racing team between 1999 and 2001

Dick Simon Racing was a race team owned by racer Dick Simon that competed in the CART Championship Car series from 1983 to 1995 and the Indy Racing League from 1999 to 2001.

== CART ==
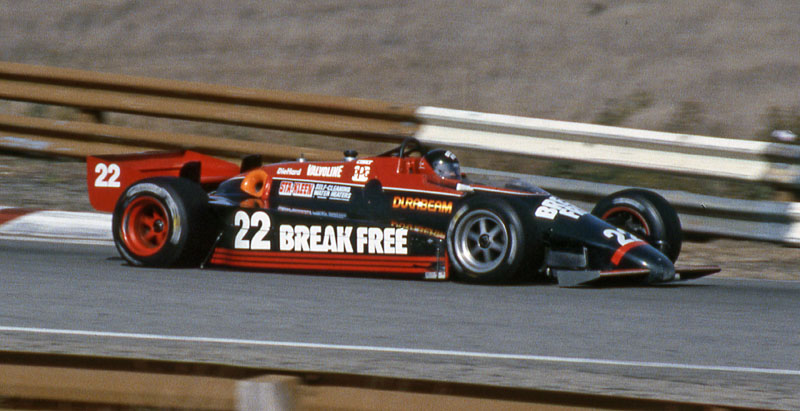
Dick Simon's March 84C at Laguna Seca in 1984.

The team was founded in 1983 when Simon decided to bring his sponsorship from Vermont American to a new team of his own creation. He saw an immediate boost in performance as he qualified for the Indianapolis 500 for the first time since 1980 and was noticeably more competitive than he was with the Leader Card team. In 1985 Simon brought in Brazilian Raul Boesel to drive full-time as he scaled back his own racing to a part-time schedule, occasionally joining Boesel in a second car. Simon only competed in four races in 1986 as Boesel drove the team's primary car to 17th in points and was competitive in nearly every race. A number of other drivers made part-time appearances in Simon's other entry as Dick Simon Racing became one of the premier teams for pay drivers. This trend continued in 1988 which would be Simon's final year of racing as Arie Luyendyk replaced Boesel in the team's full-time entry. In 1989 Scott Brayton joined Luyendyk as the team fielded a pair of full-time fully funded entries for the first time. Luyendyk finished 10th in points while Brayton finished 15th. Luyendyk left the team for 1990 and was replaced by Japanese rookie Hiro Matsushita while Brayton again finished 15th. Matsushita took his Panasonic funding elsewhere for 1991, leaving Brayton to drive a single Simon entry to a respectable 12th-place points finish. Brayton, Matsushita, and Boesel returned to the team in 1992 and Boesel finished 9th in the championship while Brayton finished 15th again. The team also fielded a car in the Indy 500 for female rookie Lyn St. James who became the second woman to compete in the race. St. James returned for a partial schedule in 1993 while Brayton and Boesel drove the full-time cars to 15th and 5th-place points finishes respectively, with Boesel capturing 3 runner-up finishes. In 1994 Matsushita again returned to the team as Boesel continued in the other car, this time finishing 7th in points. In 1995 the team signed Dean Hall and Formula One veteran Eliseo Salazar to drive the team's two cars and they were joined in April by rookie Carlos Guerrero. Hall left the team after failing to qualify for the Indy 500 while Salazar and Guerrero managed 21st and 30th-place points finishes respectively.

The team finished its years in CART without winning a race, but captured two poles, both by Boesel at the Milwaukee Mile in 1993 and 1994. The team had six second-place finishes, one with Arie Luyendyk in 1988, and the rest with Boesel.

As an owner, Simon had a stellar record of his rookie drivers successfully qualifying for the Indy 500. As a tradition, Simon cars frequently made the effort to be "first car(s) on the track" at Indy on the opening day of practice, a popular ceremonial honor.

== Indy Racing League ==
In 1996 Dick Simon sold much of the team's cars and assets to Team Scandia founder Andy Evans and Simon was listed on many of the team's entries in the new Indy Racing League as Simon/Scandia Racing. It was during that year that Scandia set a race record by having 7 of their cars qualify for the Indianapolis 500.

Dick Simon returned to the IRL in 1999 with Stephan Gregoire who competed in a full schedule but failed to qualify for the Indy 500 and finished 15th in points. Gregoire returned in 2000 and finished 14th in points and was joined in the Indianapolis 500 by Lyn St. James who began her IndyCar career with Simon 8 years earlier. Both cars made the race and while St. James wrecked early in the race (after being hit by fellow female driver Sarah Fisher), Gregoire finished 8th. Gregoire was set to return for a full season in 2001, but after the team again failed to qualify for the Indy 500, the team shut down in May of that year.

When his own team failed to qualify at the 2001 Indy 500, on race day Simon was hired to be the team strategist for Robby Gordon at A. J. Foyt Enterprises.

== NASCAR ==
At the 1994 Brickyard 400, Dick Simon was the co-owner of Jim Sauter's entry. The car failed to qualify.

== Drivers ==
=== CART ===
- (United Kingdom) Ian Ashley (1986–1987)
- (Italy) Fulvio Ballabio (1988)
- (Brazil) Raul Boesel (1985–1986, 1992–1994)
- (Australia) Gary Brabham (1993)
- (United States) Scott Brayton (1989–1993)
- (Switzerland) Jean-Pierre Frey (1988)
- (France) Philippe Gache (1992)
- (France) Bertrand Gachot (1993)
- (Brazil) Marco Greco (1995)
- (Mexico) Carlos Guerrero (1995)
- (Brazil) Maurício Gugelmin (1993)
- (United States) Dean Hall (1995)
- (Canada) Ludwig Heimrath Jr. (1987)
- (Peru) Jorge Koechlin (1983)
- (Netherlands) Arie Luyendyk (1988–1989, 1995)
- (Japan) Hideshi Matsuda (1994)
- (Japan) Hiro Matsushita (1990, 1992, 1994)
- (United States) Mike Nish (1984)
- (Finland) Tero Palmroth (1988–1990)
- (United States) Tom Phillips (1986)
- (United States) Scott Pruett (1988)
- (United States) John Richards (1987)
- (United States) Chip Robinson (1986)
- (Chile) Eliseo Salazar (1995)
- (United States) Dick Simon (1983–1988)
- (United States) Joe Sposato (1990)
- (United States) Lyn St. James (1992–1995)
- (Belgium) Didier Theys (1988)
- (United States) Dennis Vitolo (1994)
- (United States) Jeff Wood (1987)

=== IRL ===
- (Italy) Michele Alboreto (1996*)
- (United States) Racin Gardner (1996*)
- (France) Stephan Gregoire (1999–2001)
- (United States) Joe Gosek (1996*)
- (Mexico) Michel Jourdain Jr. (1996*)
- (United States) Lyn St. James (1996*, 2000)
- (Spain) Fermin Velez (1996*)
- (Italy) Alessandro Zampedri (1996*)

* indicates car was entered as Simon/Scandia Racing

== Complete Racing Results ==
=== PPG CART Indycar World Series ===
(key)

Year	Chassis	Engine	Drivers	No.	1	2	3	4	5	6	7	8	9	10	11	12	13	14	15	16	17	Pts Pos	Pos
1983					ATL	INDY	MIL	CLE	MCH	ROA	POC	RIV	MDO	MCH	CPL	LAG	PHX						
1983	March 83C	Cosworth DFX	(United States) Dick Simon	22	DNQ	15	11		14					19	14		23					29th	**2**
1983	Eagle 83	Cosworth DFX	(United States) Dick Simon	22						13		25	15									29th	**2**
1983	Eagle 83	Cosworth DFX	(Peru) Jorge Koechlin **(R)**	19												15						41st	**0**
1984					LBH	PHX	INDY	MIL	POR	MEA	CLE	MCH	ROA	POC	MDO	SAN	MCH	PHX	LAG	CPL			
1984	March 84C	Cosworth DFX	(United States) Dick Simon	22	19	4	23	13	20	24	DNQ	12	15	12	24	12	15	21	14	DNQ		25th	**15**
1984	March 84C	Cosworth DFX	(United States) Mike Nish **(R)**	23														15		DNQ		40th	**0**
1985					LBH	INDY	MIL	POR	MEA	CLE	MCH	ROA	POC	MDO	SAN	MCH	LAG	PHX	MIA				
1985	March 85C	Cosworth DFX	(Brazil) Raul Boesel **(R)**	22	20			11	11	12		8		23			20		23			30th	**10**
1985	March 85C	Cosworth DFX	(Brazil) Raul Boesel **(R)**	23		18					28											30th	**10**
1985	March 85C	Cosworth DFX	(United States) Dick Simon	22		26	13				25		10		17	19		DNQ				36th	**3**
1985	March 85C	Cosworth DFX	(United States) Dick Simon	23					17													36th	**3**
1985	March 84C	Cosworth DFX	(United States) Mike Nish	23		DNQ																NC	—
1986					PHX	LBH	INDY	MIL	POR	MEA	CLE	TOR	MCH	POC	MDO	SAN	MCH	ROA	LAG	PHX	MIA		
1986	Lola T8600	Cosworth DFX	(Brazil) Raul Boesel	22	13	19	13	14	8	23	6	7	5	5	7	9	15	8	14	13	19	13th	**54**
1986	Lola T8600	Cosworth DFX	(United States) Dick Simon	23			14				22			23		20						42nd	**0**
1986	Lola T8600	Cosworth DFX	(United States) Chip Robinson **(R)**	23						14											7	26th	**6**
1986	Lola T8600	Cosworth DFX	(United Kingdom) Ian Ashley	23								15			9			23				28th	**4**
1987					LBH	PHX	INDY	MIL	POR	MEA	CLE	TOR	MCH	POC	ROA	MDO	NAZ	LAG	MIA				
1987	Lola T8700	Cosworth DFX	(United States) Dick Simon	22	20	10	6	20	18	14	23	23	9	21			18					20th	**15**
1987	Lola T8700	Cosworth DFX	(United States) Wally Dallenbach Jr.	22											12							37th	**1**
1987	Lola T8700	Cosworth DFX	(Canada) Ludwig Heimrath	22												26						34th	**5**
1987	Lola T8700	Cosworth DFX	(Canada) Ludwig Heimrath	23	15	22	30	10	12	17	18	19	25	12								34th	**5**
1987	Lola T8700	Cosworth DFX	(Italy) Fulvio Ballabio **(R)**	23															26			48th	**0**
1987	Lola T8700	Cosworth DFX	(United States) Jeff Wood	23											10	15	DNQ	10				33rd	**6**
1987	Lola T8700	Cosworth DFX	(United States) Jeff Wood	22															23			33rd	**6**
1987	Lola T8700	Cosworth DFX	(United States) John Richards **(R)**	22														13				38th	**0**
1987	Lola T8600	Cosworth DFX	(United States) John Richards **(R)**	27						26	13	14										38th	**0**
1987	Lola T8600	Cosworth DFX	(United Kingdom) Ian Ashley	27															20			43rd	**0**
1988					PHX	LBH	INDY	MIL	POR	CLE	TOR	MEA	MCH	POC	MDO	ROA	NAZ	LAG	MIA				
1988	Lola T8800	Cosworth DFX	(Netherlands) Arie Luyendyk	7	9	10	10	15	2*	18	20	20	28	26	25	19	9	22	14			14th	**31**
1988	Lola T8800	Cosworth DFX	(United States) Dick Simon	22			9	12					7				20					24th	**11**
1988	Lola T8700	Cosworth DFX	(United States) Dick Simon	22	19									19								24th	**11**
1988	Lola T8700	Cosworth DFX	(United States) Scott Pruett **(R)**	22		18																38th	**0**
1988	Lola T8800	Cosworth DFX	(Belgium) Didier Theys	22					10	9	18	21			10	23		8	3			15th	**29**
1988	Lola T8700	Cosworth DFX	(Italy) Fulvio Ballabio	23		25									17	18						39th	**0**
1988	Lola T8700	Cosworth DFX	(Finland) Tero Palmroth **(R)**	23			19		18													42nd	**0**
1988	Lola T8700	Cosworth DFX	(Switzerland) Jean-Pierre Frey **(R)**	23														13	19			37th	**0**
1989					PHX	LBH	INDY	MIL	DET	POR	CLE	MEA	TOR	MCH	POC	MDO	ROA	NAZ	LAG				
1989	Lola T8900	Cosworth DFS	(Netherlands) Arie Luyendyk	7	17	7		6	6	3	9	7	24	6	23	8	4	13	9			10th	**75**
1989	Lola T8900	Cosworth DFS	(Netherlands) Arie Luyendyk	9			21															10th	**75**
1989	Lola T8900	Cosworth DFS	(United States) Scott Brayton	22	15	12		18	DSQ	13	28	10	14	11	14	15	13	10	20			15th	**17**
1989	Lola T8900	Buick 3300 V6t	(United States) Scott Brayton	22			6															15th	**17**
1990					PHX	LBH	INDY	MIL	DET	POR	CLE	MEA	TOR	MCH	DEN	VAN	MDO	ROA	NAZ	LAG			
1990	Lola T8900	Cosworth DFS	(Japan) Hiro Matsushita **(R)**	10		19	DNQ		19	12		16			15	23	17	18	21	23		31st	**1**
1990	Lola T9000	Cosworth DFS	(Finland) Tero Palmroth	10										DNS								33rd	**1**
1990	Lola T9000	Cosworth DFS	(Finland) Tero Palmroth	23			12															33rd	**1**
1990	Lola T8900	Cosworth DFS	(Finland) Tero Palmroth	23					28			27										33rd	**1**
1990	Lola T8900	Cosworth DFS	(United States) Johnny Rutherford	23			DNQ															NC	—
1990	Lola T8900	Cosworth DFS	(United States) Joe Sposato **(R)**	23																17		39th	**0**
1990	Lola T9000	Cosworth DFS	(United States) Scott Brayton	22	13	9	7	20	10	25	22	9	14	16	12	9	8	13	12	24		15th	**28**
1991					SFR	LBH	PHX	INDY	MIL	DET	POR	CLE	MEA	TOR	MCH	DEN	VAN	MDO	ROA	NAZ	LAG		
1991	Lola T9000	Cosworth DFS	(Japan) Hiro Matsushita	7	21		14		10	14	14											23rd	**6**
1991	Lola T9100	Cosworth DFS	(Japan) Hiro Matsushita	7		13						14	12	15	19	14	16	14	12	12		23rd	**6**
1991	Lola T9100	Buick 3300 V6t	(Japan) Hiro Matsushita	7				16														23rd	**6**
1991	Lola T9100	Chevrolet 265A	(Japan) Hiro Matsushita	7																	20	23rd	**6**
1991	Lola T9100	Chevrolet 265A	(United States) Scott Brayton	22	6	8	13	17	6	9	15	7	9	6	9	16	10	13	11	19	27	12th	**52**
1991	Lola T9000	Cosworth DFS	(Finland) Tero Palmroth	23				23														48th	**0**
1992					SFR	PHX	LBH	INDY	DET	POR	MIL	NHA	TOR	MCH	CLE	ROA	VAN	MDO	NAZ	LAG			
1992	Lola T9200	Chevrolet 265A	(Japan) Hiro Matsushita	11	DNQ	16	10	DNQ							24	14	13	18	14	15		27th	**3**
1992	Lola T9200	Chevrolet 265A	(Brazil) Raul Boesel	11				7	2	9	10	18		3								9th	**80**
1992	Lola T9200	Chevrolet 265A	(Brazil) Raul Boesel	23									22		6	8	11	7	6	6		9th	**80**
1992	Lola T9200	Chevrolet 265A	(United States) Scott Brayton	22	20	9	17		12	22	3	17	17	10	21	12	8	10	8	10		15th	**39**
1992	Lola T9200	Buick 3300 V6t	(United States) Scott Brayton	22				22														15th	**39**
1992	Lola T9100	Chevrolet 265A	(France) Philippe Gache **(R)**	44				28														60th	**0**
1992	Lola T9100	Chevrolet 265A	(United States) Lyn St. James **(R)**	90				11														33rd	**1**
1993					SFR	PHX	LBH	INDY	MIL	DET	POR	CLE	TOR	MCH	NHA	ROA	VAN	MDO	NAZ	LAG			
1993	Lola T9306	Ford XB	(Brazil) Raul Boesel	9	8	2	12	4	**2***	2	7	7	7	4	21	4	9	4	9	11		5th	**132**
1993	Lola T9200	Ford XB	(United States) Scott Brayton	22	16	25				14												15th	**36**
1993	Lola T9306	Ford XB	(United States) Scott Brayton	22			24	6	6		17	18	19	11	6	7	24	9	15	24		15th	**36**
1993	Lola T9200	Ford XB	(Belgium) Didier Theys	23																15		42nd	**0**
1993	Lola T9200	Buick 3300 V6t	(France) Stéphan Grégoire **(R)**	36				19														46th	**0**
1993	Lola T9200	Chevrolet 265A	(United States) John Brooks	44																DNQ		NC	—
1993	Lola T9200	Chevrolet 265A	(Australia) Gary Brabham **(R)**	90	14																	40th	**0**
1993	Lola T9200	Ford XB	(United States) Lyn St. James	90		13	17															36th	**0**
1993	Lola T9306	Ford XB	(United States) Lyn St. James	90				25		DNQ	20	23		22								36th	**0**
1993	Lola T9306	Ford XB	(France) Bertrand Gachot **(R)**	90									12									34th	**1**
1993	Lola T9306	Ford XB	(United States) Eddie Cheever	90												6						17th	**21**
1993	Lola T9306	Ford XB	(Brazil) Maurício Gugelmin **(R)**	90														21		13		37th	**0**
1993	Lola T9306	Ford XB	(Brazil) Maurício Gugelmin **(R)**	18															24			37th	**0**
1994					SFR	PHX	LBH	INDY	MIL	DET	POR	CLE	TOR	MCH	MDO	NHA	VAN	ROA	NAZ	LAG			
1994	Lola T9400	Ford XB	(Brazil) Raul Boesel	5	27	8	4	21	**8**	28	23	6	12	9*	8	4	23	6	4	2		7th	**90**
1994	Lola T9400	Ford XB	(Japan) Hiro Matsushita	22	15	27	DNQ	14	23	DNQ	21	15	18	6	18	17	DNQ	14	16	23		26th	**8**
1994	Lola T9400	Ford XB	(United States) Lyn St. James	90				19														48th	**0**
1994	Lola T9306	Ford XB	(United States) Dennis Vitolo	79				26														53rd	**0**
1994	Lola T9306	Ford XB	(Finland) Tero Palmroth	79				DNQ														NC	—
1994	Lola T9306	Ford XB	(Japan) Hideshi Matsuda **(R)**	99				24														52nd	**0**
1995					MIA	SFR	PHX	LBH	NAZ	INDY	MIL	DET	POR	ROA	TOR	CLE	MCH	MDO	NHA	VAN	LAG		
1995	Lola T9400	Ford XB	(Chile) Eliseo Salazar **(R)**	7				24														21st	**19**
1995	Lola T9500	Ford XB	(Chile) Eliseo Salazar **(R)**	7	17	10	15		12	4	16	20	15	18	21	10	18	13	13	13	DNQ	21st	**19**
1995	Lola T9500	Ford XB	(Netherlands) Arie Luyendyk	22			25															26th	**6**
1995	Lola T9500	Ford XB	(Mexico) Carlos Guerrero	22				11		33	15		24		24	17	26	18	16	15	18	30th	**2**
1995	Lola T9400	Ford XB	(Mexico) Carlos Guerrero	22					14			21		19								30th	**2**
1995	Lola T9500	Ford XB	(United States) Davy Jones	77						23												43rd	**0**
1995	Lola T9500	Ford XB	(United States) Lyn St. James	90						32							17					39th	**0**
1995	Lola T9400	Ford XB	(United States) Lyn St. James	90							20											39th	**0**
1995	Lola T9400	Ford XB	(Finland) Tero Palmroth	90						DNQ												NC	—
1995	Lola T9500	Ford XB	(United States) Dean Hall	99	12	12	17	17	16	DNQ												31st	**2**
1996					MIA	RIO	SFR	LBH	NAZ	500	MIL	DET	POR	CLE	TOR	MCH	MDO	ROA	VAN	LAG			
1996	Lola T9600	Ford XB	(Brazil) Marco Greco	7	25	12																23nd	**1**
1996	Lola T9600	Ford XB	(Chile) Eliseo Salazar	7							21		18			11	15					30th	**2**
1996	Lola T9600	Ford XB	(Mexico) Carlos Guerrero	22	20	20	14															33rd	**0**
1996	Lola T9600	Ford XB	(Mexico) Michel Jourdain Jr. **(R)**	22				23			23	DNS	22						16	26		37th	**0**

=== Indy Racing League results ===
(key) (Results in bold indicate pole position; results in italics indicate fastest lap)

Year	Chassis	Engine	Drivers	No.	1	2	3	4	5	6	7	8	9	10	11	12	13
1996^{1}					WDW	PHX	INDY										
1996^{1}	Lola T95; Lola T94 (Note: Used by Alessandro Zampedri, Joe Gosek and Racin Gardner.); Lola T93 (Note: Used by Lyn St. James at Walt Disney World); Reynard 95I (Note: Used by Michele Alboreto at Walt Disney World and Lyn St. James at Phoenix.)	Ford Cosworth	(Chile) Eliseo Salazar	7	Wth		6										
1996^{1}	Lola T95; Lola T94; Lola T93; Reynard 95I	Ford Cosworth	(Spain) Fermín Vélez	7		19											
1996^{1}	Lola T95; Lola T94; Lola T93; Reynard 95I	Ford Cosworth	(Spain) Fermín Vélez	34			21										
1996^{1}	Lola T95; Lola T94; Lola T93; Reynard 95I	Ford Cosworth	(Italy) Alessandro Zampedri	8			4										
1996^{1}	Lola T95; Lola T94; Lola T93; Reynard 95I	Ford Cosworth	(Mexico) Michel Jourdain Jr.	22		20	13										
1996^{1}	Lola T95; Lola T94; Lola T93; Reynard 95I	Ford Cosworth	(Italy) Michele Alboreto	33	4	8	30										
1996^{1}	Lola T95; Lola T94; Lola T93; Reynard 95I	Ford Cosworth	(United States) Joe Gosek (Note: Switched from Tempero-Giuffre Racing (car #15) during practice for the Indy 500.)	43			22										
1996^{1}	Lola T95; Lola T94; Lola T93; Reynard 95I	Ford Cosworth	(United States) Lyn St. James	90	8	21											
1996^{1}	Lola T95; Lola T94; Lola T93; Reynard 95I	Ford Cosworth	(United States) Racin Gardner	90			25										
1999					WDW	PHX	CLT	INDY	TXS	PPIR	ATL	DOV	PPIR	LSV	TXS		
1999	G-Force GF01C	Oldsmobile Aurora V8	(France) Stéphan Grégoire	7	16	10	C^{2}	DNQ	4	11	24	14	14	8	15		
2000					WDW	PHX	LSV	INDY	TXS	PPIR	ATL	KTY	TXS				
2000	G-Force GF05	Oldsmobile Aurora V8	(France) Stéphan Grégoire	7	18	8	28	8	11	8	7	5	20				
2000	G-Force GF05	Oldsmobile Aurora V8	(United States) Lyn St. James	90				32									
2001					PHX	HMS	ATL	INDY	TXS	PPIR	RIR	KAN	NSH	KTY	GAT	CHI	TXS
2001	Dallara IR-01	Oldsmobile Aurora V8	(France) Stéphan Grégoire	7	21	22	15	DNQ									
2001	Dallara IR-01	Oldsmobile Aurora V8	(Colombia) Roberto Guerrero	7				DNQ									
2001	Dallara IR-01	Oldsmobile Aurora V8	(Colombia) Roberto Guerrero	17				DNQ									

1. Run in conjunction with Team Scandia.
2. The 1999 VisionAire 500K at Charlotte was cancelled after 79 laps due to spectator fatalities.
