= 1990 Indianapolis 500 =

American motor race

74th Indianapolis 500
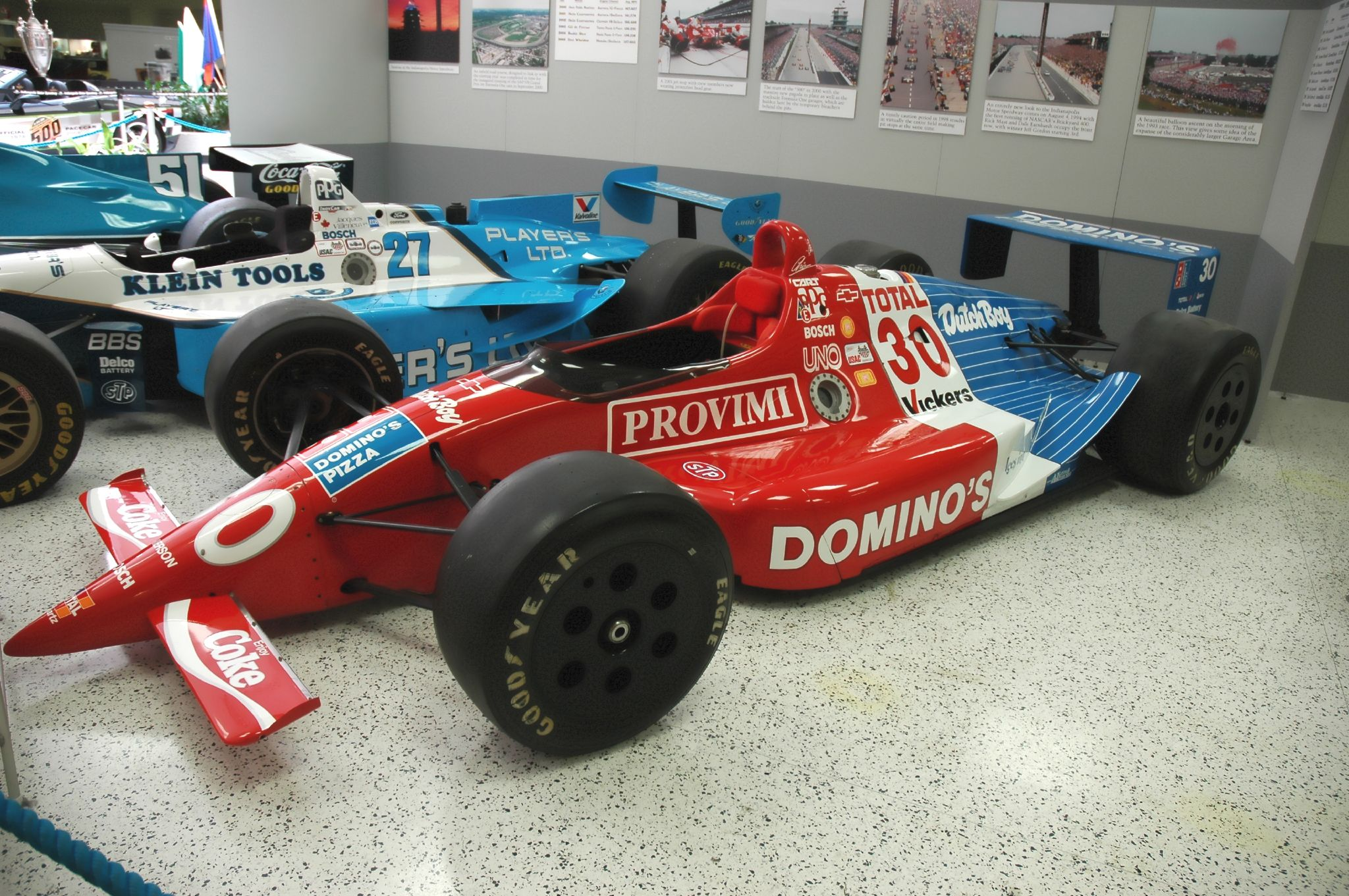

Indianapolis Motor Speedway

Indianapolis 500
- Sanctioning body: USAC
- Season: 1990 CART season 1989–90 Gold Crown
- Date: May 27, 1990
- Winner: (Netherlands) Arie Luyendyk
- Winning team: Doug Shierson Racing
- Winning Chief Mechanic: Michael Battersby
- Time of race: 2:41:18.404
- Average speed: 185.981 mph
- Pole position: (Brazil) Emerson Fittipaldi
- Pole speed: 225.301 mph
- Fastest qualifier: (Brazil) Emerson Fittipaldi
- Rookie of the Year: (United States) Eddie Cheever
- Most laps led: (Brazil) Emerson Fittipaldi (128)

Pre-race ceremonies
- National anthem: Sandi Patti
- "Back Home Again in Indiana": Jim Nabors
- Starting command: Mary F. Hulman
- Pace car: Chevrolet Beretta
- Pace car driver: Jim Perkins
- Starter: Duane Sweeney
- Estimated attendance: 400,000

Television in the United States
- Network: ABC
- Announcers: Host/Lap-by-lap: Paul Page; Color Analyst: Sam Posey; Color Analyst Bobby Unser

Chronology
Previous	Next
1989	1991

The 74th Indianapolis 500 was held at the Indianapolis Motor Speedway in Speedway, Indiana on Sunday, May 27, 1990. Dutchman Arie Luyendyk took the lead with 32 laps to go, and earned his first-ever victory in championship-level competition. It was the second consecutive year the Indy 500 was won by a foreign-born competitor, the first time that had occurred since 1965–1966. Luyendyk completed the 500 miles at an average speed of 185.981 mph (299.307 km/h), a record that stood for 23 years until 2013. (Note: The race average speed record for 500 miles set in 2013 was subsequently broken in 2021. Helio Castroneves won the 2021 Indianapolis 500 at an average speed of 190.690 mph, a record that still stands as of 2026.) In reference to the long-standing speed record, for many years the 1990 race was often referred to as "The Fastest 500".

Defending champion Emerson Fittipaldi started on the pole position and dominated the first half of the race. Setting a new track record in qualifying, Fittipaldi became the first driver to break the 225 mph barrier in time trials. Fittipaldi took the lead at the start, and led the first 92 laps, a new race record. He was looking to become the first back-to-back winner in nineteen years. In the second half of the race, however, he fell victim to blistering tires, fell a lap down, and wound up finishing third. Bobby Rahal, the 1986 winner, was in position to win his second Indy 500, but he too suffered handling problems, which dropped him to second at the finish. Luyendyk, driving for Doug Shierson Racing (the race would be Shierson's final 500), did not experience the handling issues that befell the other competitors, and won the race by a margin of 11.878 seconds.

A. J. Foyt, making his 33rd consecutive Indy start, finished in sixth place. Rookie Jeff Andretti attempted to become the unprecedented fourth member of the Andretti family to qualify for the same race, but was bumped on the final day of time trials. Jim Crawford survived a spectacular airborne crash during practice, and for the second year in a row, three-time winner Johnny Rutherford struggled to get his car up to speed, and failed to qualify.

Rain hampered much of the month, washing out nearly the entire first weekend of time trials as well as two practice days. The 1990 race was also the first Indy 500 presided over by Tony George, who was named president of the Speedway in January. The race was sanctioned by USAC, and was included as part of the 1990 CART PPG Indy Car World Series.

== Background ==
=== Rule changes ===
1990 Indy 500 ticket stub.

Controversy hovered over the month, regarding new aerodynamic rules. All teams utilizing 1989 (or older) model year chassis were required to affix a "diffuser" to the underbody ground effects tunnels, to reduce their depth by 2 inches – a rule intended to reduce downforce and curtail speeds. Teams that had the means to do so could also refabricate the entire undertray to conform to the new specifications. Competitors complained that the diffusers made their cars unstable and unbalanced, and were responsible for the increased number of practice crashes involving the older cars. Despite voiced complaints and meetings with officials, no changes were made to the rules. Ultimately, no major crashes occurred amongst the older cars during the race itself.

The Porsche Indycar team, led by Derrick Walker, was fresh off their first victory at Mid-Ohio in September 1989 with driver Teo Fabi. They planned to roll out a new March chassis for 1990, the first all-carbon fiber monocoque Indy car. Rules were evolving by the CART series (and likewise USAC) to eventually allow for all-carbon fiber chassis. Porsche interpreted the rules as permitting the car for 1990, provided they were granted a waiver, and embarked on the project. However, in January, the board of directors voted to disallow the chassis for competition in 1990. The Porsche team was forced to utilize a March chassis that was constructed with a then-standard aluminum bottom to adhere to the rules. All-carbon fiber monocoques would be delayed until 1991.

With the Pocono 500 disbanded after 1989, the 1990 Indy car season and beyond would no longer feature a "Triple crown" of 500-mile races. The triple crown would not return until 2013.

=== Team and driver changes ===
Team and driver changes for 1990 were highlighted by defending CART champion and defending Indy winner Emerson Fittipaldi (and sponsor Marlboro) departing Patrick Racing and joining Penske Racing. The Penske team would be a three-car effort in 1990 with Fittipaldi, Rick Mears, and Danny Sullivan.

Meanwhile, Chip Ganassi took over the assets of the former Patrick Racing, and it became Chip Ganassi Racing. Eddie Cheever, who had spent the past decade in Formula One, and was the United States' lone F1 participant, switched to the CART series for 1990 and took the seat. Target was brought in as the new sponsor for the budding team, beginning one of the longest tenures for an Indy car sponsor (1990–2016) in the history of the sport.

KRACO Racing (Bobby Rahal) owned by Maurice Kraines, merged with the Rick Galles team. They became a two-car effort known as Galles-KRACO Racing. Al Unser Jr. returned in the Valvoline-sponsored entry, and Rahal got the use of the Chevy Ilmor V-8 engine for the first time.

Arie Luyendyk left Dick Simon Racing, and joined Doug Shierson Racing to drive the #30 Domino's Pizza "Hot One" Chevrolet entry. After the previous two years utilizing Judd power, Shierson also was granted a lease for the Chevy Ilmor engine.

Truesports driver Scott Pruett, who won the rookie of the year award in 1989, had a serious crash at West Palm Beach during preseason testing. He suffered serious leg injuries, and was forced to sit out the season for rehabilitation. Raul Boesel was hired to drive as a substitute. The Truesports team was already in development of their in-house "All American" chassis, which was scheduled to debut in 1991. For the 1990 season, the team utilized 1989 Lola/Judd machines to save cost. However, they re-fabricated the underbody of the cars in order to adhere to the new rules specifications, and avoided the need to use the aforementioned "diffusers".

The Alfa Romeo Indy car effort, formerly headed up by Alex Morales Motorsports, was taken over in 1990 by a re-booted Patrick Racing. The Alfa Romeo engine had not been ready in time to race at the 1989 Indy 500, therefore 1990 would its first appearance at Indy. Roberto Guerrero, who drove for Morales in 1989, was kept on as the driver for 1990 at Patrick. Al Unser Sr., released by Penske, was brought in to enter a second team car at Indy and the other 500-miler at Michigan. Patrick Racing assumed the sponsorship of Miller, previously associated with Penske. It was another "trade" between the two organizations.

=== Construction ===
During the offseason, the Tower Terrace Extension grandstand was razed at the north end of the pit area. In its place, a new 900-foot long, 17,000-seat permanent double-decker grandstand was constructed. It featured aluminum chair-back bench seating, as well as modern restroom facilities and storefront space on the lower level. On the upper deck, 38 luxury suites were built, each with seats for 80 people.

In the south short-chute, near the museum, the first dedicated Wheelchair Accessible grandstand was constructed. With seating for 302 persons, (including non-handicapped "companion" seating), the Speedway introduced its first ADA-compliant grandstand.

Across the street from turn one, a famous Speedway landmark, the brick smokestack of the former Prest-O-Lite company was demolished. For decades, the smokestack was said to be used by drivers to see clues about wind speed and direction. It was taken down by wrecking ball just two months after the 1990 race.

== Schedule ==
Race schedule — April/May, 1990
Sun	Mon	Tue	Wed	Thu	Fri	Sat
22	23	24	25	26	27; ROP	28; ROP
29; ROP	30	1	2	3	4	5 Practice
6 Practice	7 Practice	8 Practice	9 Practice	10; Practice	11; Practice	12; Pole Day
13; Time Trials	14; Practice	15; Practice	16; Practice	17; Practice	18; Practice	19; Time Trials
20; Bump Day	21	22	23	24; Carb Day	25; Mini-Marathon	26; Parade
27; Indy 500	28; Memorial Day	29	30	31		

Color	Notes
Green	Practice
Dark Blue	Time trials
Silver	Race day
Red	Rained out*
Blank	No track activity

* Includes days where track
activity was significantly
limited due to rain

ROP — denotes Rookie
Orientation Program

== Practice (first week) ==
During rookie orientation, driver Steve Barclay was injured in a crash, and was forced to sit out practice.

=== Opening day – Saturday May 5 ===
Tero Palmroth of Dick Simon Racing earned the honor of first car out on the track on opening day. The first day of practice saw moderate activity, with Tom Sneva in a Buick-powered entry setting the fastest lap (215.646 mph).

Several drivers (Al Unser Jr., Emerson Fittipaldi, Geoff Brabham, Bobby Rahal, and Danny Sullivan) were not present for opening day due to their participation in the first round of IROC XIV at Talladega. Unser Jr., who finished second in that race, along with Rahal, did make it to Indianapolis in time to take a few practice laps.

=== Sunday May 6 ===
History was made at Indy when four members of the same family practiced on the track at the same time. Mario, Michael, John, and Jeff Andretti all were on the track together for a brief time at 3:35 p.m.

Jim Crawford crashed in turn one 20 minutes before the track closed for the day.

Emerson Fittipaldi, taking his first laps of the month, topped the speed chart with a lap of 222.607 mph.

=== Monday May 7 ===
Three crashes occurred on Monday. Johnny Rutherford, rookie Buddy Lazier, and Bill Vukovich III all suffered wall contact. Lazier hit the outside wall at the exit of turn four. Rutherford went high exiting turn two, and brushed the wall. Vukovich was the most serious, crashing hard in turn one, suffering a concussion.

Rick Mears (224.398 mph) set the fastest lap, with Arie Luyendyk (222.816 mph) second and Emerson Fittipaldi (222.211 mph) third.

=== Tuesday May 8 ===
Emerson Fittipaldi (223.286 mph) was the fastest of the day. Steve Chassey crashed in turn three.

=== Wednesday May 9 ===
Johnny Rutherford had his second crash of the month. He spun in turn three, and crashed hard into the outside wall, suffering a concussion and knee injury.

Al Unser Jr. (220.507 mph) was the fastest of the day. Arie Luyendyk was second-fastest once again.

=== Thursday May 10 ===
A cold, windy afternoon kept most cars off the track. Jim Crawford, driving his back-up car, was the fastest of the day at only 208.686 mph. Only two cars turned laps over 200 mph, and of the 12 drivers that completed laps, few took any laps at speed.

The track was closed 51 minutes early due to weather conditions. Only 74 laps were turned all day.

=== Friday May 11 ===
On the final day of practice before time trials, the speeds climbed, and activity was heavy. At least 40 drivers took to the track, completing 1,517 laps.

Two minor crashes occurred early in the afternoon. Rookies Jeff Wood and Jeff Andretti both suffered accidents. Wood hit the outside wall exiting turn one, then brushed it three more times as the car came to a stop. He was uninjured. Andretti spun in turn four, hitting the outside wall. The car was heavily damaged, but Andretti suffered only a bruised knee.

Shortly after 4 p.m., Emerson Fittipaldi rans laps of 227.101 mph and 227.181 mph. They were the fastest unofficial laps in Indy history. Not to be upstaged, at 5:09 p.m., Al Unser Jr. blistered the track with a lap of 228.502 mph, the fastest practice lap ever run at Indy.

At 5:24 p.m., Jim Crawford suffered his second crash of the week. This accident, which occurred in the south short chute, was spectacular. He spun in turn one, hit the outside wall, then as the car came off wall, debris lifted the chassis airborne. It flew approximately 15–20 feet off the ground for as much as 280 feet, then came to the ground, upright. It continued to slide for another 360 feet and came to rest along the inside wall. Crawford was not seriously injured.

The first week of practice ended with Unser Jr., Fittipaldi, Rick Mears, and Mario Andretti topping the speed chart. All four had run laps over 225 mph.

== Time trials (First weekend) ==
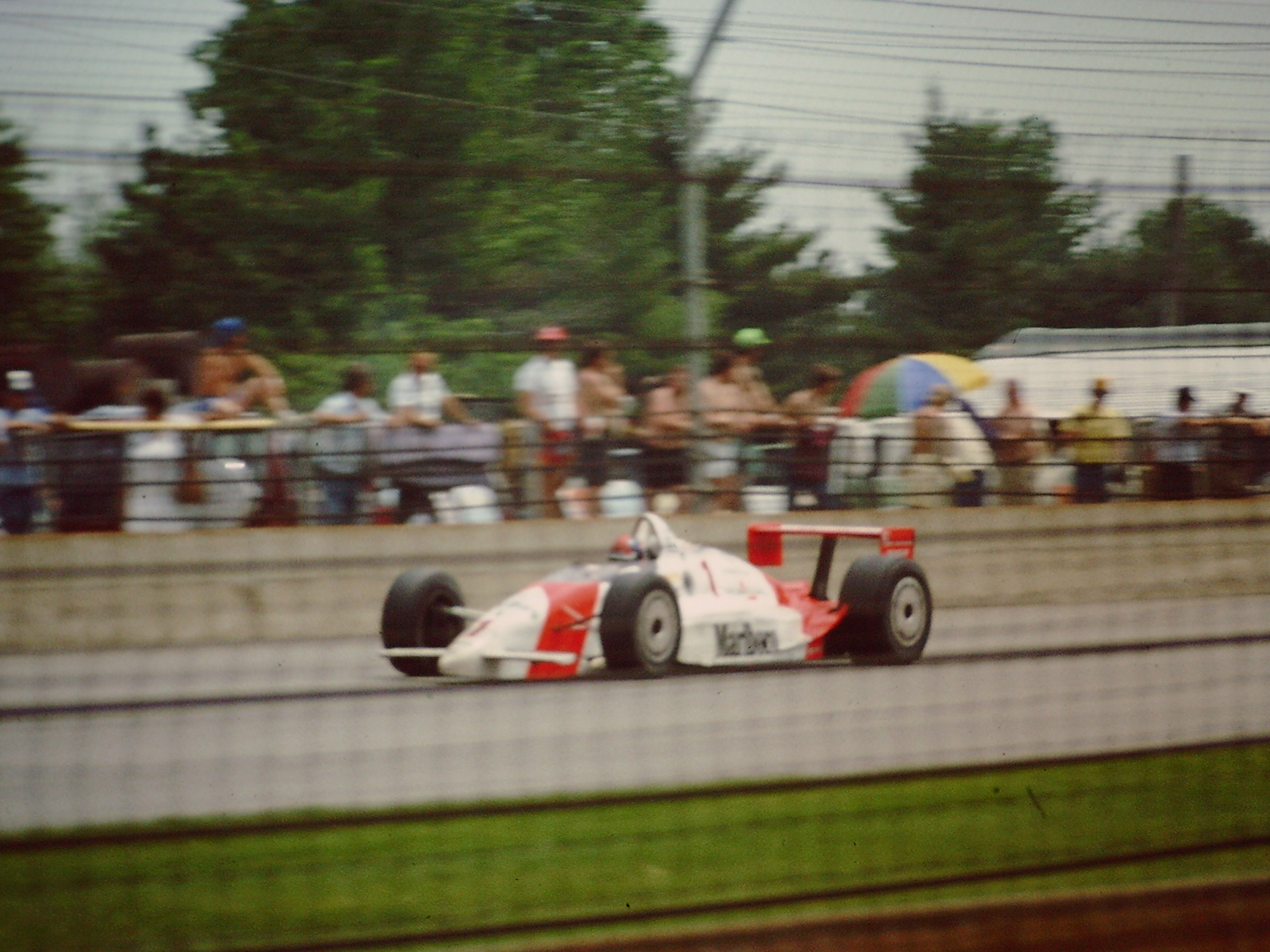
Emerson Fittipaldi won the pole position.

=== Saturday May 12 ===
Pole day was scheduled for Saturday May 12, with Al Unser Jr. and Emerson Fittipaldi the favorites for the pole position. Rain washed out the entire day. Pole qualifying was rescheduled for Sunday.

=== Sunday May 13 ===
On Sunday, rain threatened to wash out the entire weekend. Continuing precipitation, cool temperatures and "weepers" kept the cars off the track until after 2:30 p.m. Time trials finally got underway at 4:34 p.m. Emerson Fittipaldi was the first driver to make a qualifying attempt. Fittipaldi set new one-lap and four-lap qualifying records to secure the provisional pole position. Each lap increased in speed. He became the first driver to officially break the 225 mph barrier at Indy.

- Lap 1 – 39.999 seconds, 225.006 mph (new 1-lap track record)
- Lap 2 – 39.954 seconds, 225.259 mph (new 1-lap track record)
- Lap 3 – 39.935 seconds, 225.366 mph (new 1-lap track record)
- Lap 4 – 39.898 seconds, 225.575 mph (new 1-lap track record)
- Total – 2:39.786, 225.302 mph (new 4-lap track record)

A hectic, abbreviated qualifying session saw 16 attempts before the track closed at 6 p.m. Rick Mears (224.215 mph) and Bobby Rahal (222.694 mph) tentatively rounded out the front row. The day ended when Rich Vogler wrecked in turn two on his third qualifying lap.

Several drivers including Danny Sullivan, Al Unser Jr., Arie Luyendyk, and A. J. Foyt, were left waiting in line at the 6 o'clock gun. They would have to wait until the following Saturday to have a shot at the pole position. Time trials was scheduled to pick up with the remainder of the pole round on Saturday.

Scott Brayton took to the track for his attempt, but his crew forgot to wave the green flag to start the run. His run was negated, and he lost his opportunity to qualify during the pole position round.

== Practice (second week) ==
=== Monday May 14 ===
Arie Luyendyk, who was not able to qualify yet, was the fastest car of the day at 221.773 mph. Al Unser Jr. concentrated on race day setups instead, and ran a lap of 220.496 mph.

=== Tuesday May 15 ===
Practice was rained out.

=== Wednesday May 16 ===
Practice was rained out.

=== Thursday May 17 ===
Arie Luyendyk again led the speed chart, with a lap of 217.854 mph. Rookie Guido Daccò passed his rookie test, and Salt Walther took to the track for the first time.

=== Friday May 18 ===
Al Unser Jr. re-established himself as a threat for the pole position, running a lap of 224.995 mph, the fastest of the day. But before the day was over, he blew his qualifying engine, and the team was forced to install a back-up engine for time trials.

Arie Luyendyk was second-fastest at 223.586 mph, also making him a threat for the front row. Bernard Jourdain wrecked twice in three hours, first in his backup car, then in his primary car, requiring surgery and ending his month.

== Time trials (Second weekend) ==
=== Saturday May 19 ===
On Saturday May 19, pole qualifying resumed at 11 a.m., with 16 cars still eligible for the pole round. Arie Luyendyk (223.304 mph) squeezed onto the front row, bumping Bobby Rahal back to row two. The highly anticipated run by Al Unser Jr. was a disappointment, as he only managed 220.920 mph, putting him in 7th starting position.

By holding on to the second starting position, Rick Mears qualified on the front row in his career for a record tenth time. At 11:45 a.m., the original qualifying draw had exhausted, and the pole round concluded. Emerson Fittipaldi officially won the pole position, and 23 cars were qualified. It was the second year in a row the defending champion had won the pole, and Penske Racing swept 1st–2nd on the grid.

"Third day" qualifying commenced at 11:50 a.m., with Johnny Rutherford waving off a slow run. Scott Brayton and Teo Fabi, who both of whom had missed out on a chance to qualify during the pole round, put in solid speeds. The two Alfa Romeo entries of Roberto Guerrero and Al Unser Sr. put their cars safely in the field, as did Tom Sneva in a Buick.

At 5:45 p.m., the field was filled to 33 cars, Mike Groff (203.643 mph) was on the bubble. Jim Crawford then easily bumped out Groff. After two practice crashes, and two slow qualifying attempts, Johnny Rutherford (204.801 mph) was now on the bubble. Stan Fox bumped him out by over 9 mph, and for the second year in a row, Rutherford was in a position to miss the race.

=== Bump Day – Sunday May 20 ===
Bump Day saw rain in the morning, and the track did not open until 2:30 p.m. As the day opened, rookie Buddy Lazier (209.418 mph) was on the bubble. After two attempts, John Paul Jr. was able to bump out Lazier.

In the final twenty minutes, Salt Walther (attempting to make a comeback to racing) took to the track for his first qualifying attempt in ten years. Rookie Jeff Andretti (210.268 mph) was on the bubble. Andretti was trying to hold on to qualify for the first time, and also be the fourth member of the Andretti family to qualify for the same race. Walther completed his run at 210.558 mph, just fast enough to bump Andretti.

With eight minutes left, Walther was on the bubble, trying to hang on to the 33rd and final starting position. Johnny Rutherford made one last futile effort to bump his way in, but waved off after only two laps. That allowed just enough time for Rocky Moran to take to the track. His speed of 211.076 mph bumped out Salt Walther at the 6 o'clock gun, and the field was set for race day.

== Carburetion Day ==
The final practice session was held Thursday May 17. Rick Mears (222.750 mph) was the fastest driver of the day. All 33 qualifiers, plus the first alternate took laps. No major incidents were reported, but several drivers experienced mechanical problems. Bobby Rahal and Scott Goodyear suffered engine failures. Dean Hall and John Paul Jr. reported water leaks, Billy Vukovich III had brake failure, and Gary Bettenhausen had gearbox problems. Hall also reported a misfire, but the crew changed spark plugs and he returned to the track.

=== Pit Stop Contest ===
The semifinals and finals for the 14th annual Miller Pit Stop Contest were held on Thursday May 24. Ordinarily the top three race qualifiers and their respective pit crews are automatically eligible. However, rain interrupted the first weekend of time trials, and stretched the pole qualifying round into the second weekend. Tentatively, Emerson Fittipaldi, Rick Mears, and Bobby Rahal comprised the front row, but several cars including Arie Luyendyk, Al Unser Jr., and others, had yet to make a qualifying attempt.

On Thursday May 17, the pit stop contest preliminaries were held. The results were Michael Andretti (12.895 seconds), Bobby Rahal (12.915 seconds), Al Unser Jr. (13.300 seconds), Pancho Carter (16.668 seconds), Mario Andretti (17.631 seconds), and Eddie Cheever (no time). Michael Andretti secured a spot in the semifinals. The rest of the drivers had to wait out the final results of race qualifying. When pole qualifying was finally completed on Saturday May 19, Bobby Rahal was knocked off the front row by Arie Luyendyk. The front row for the race was officially Fittipaldi, Mears, and Luyendyk. Fittipaldi accepted his berth in the pit stop contest, but Mears and Luyendyk declined. The two vacant spots in the semifinals were filled by the two next-fastest teams from the May 17 preliminaries, Bobby Rahal and Al Unser Jr. Pancho Carter was named the first alternate.

In the first semifinal, Al Unser Jr. defeated Emerson Fittipaldi. In the second semifinal, Bobby Rahal beat Michael Andretti. That set up a final against the Galles-KRACO Racing teammates. Unser Jr., led by chief mechanic Owen Snider, easily beat Rahal, led by Jim Prescott, after Rahal's crew cross-threaded the lug nut on the left rear wheel. It was Unser Jr.'s second-consecutive victory in the Pit Stop Contest.

Semifinals
5	Al Unser Jr. (Galles-KRACO Racing)	15.349
1	Emerson Fittipaldi (Penske Racing)	22.145
18	Bobby Rahal (Galles-KRACO Racing)	14.364
3	Michael Andretti (Newman/Haas Racing)	17.896

Finals
5	Al Unser Jr. (Galles-KRACO Racing)	14.094
18	Bobby Rahal (Galles-KRACO Racing)	No time

== Starting grid ==
Row	Inside		Middle		Outside	
1	1	(Brazil) Emerson Fittipaldi W	2	(United States) Rick Mears W	30	(Netherlands) Arie Luyendyk
2	18	(United States) Bobby Rahal W	3	(United States) Michael Andretti	6	(United States) Mario Andretti W
3	5	(United States) Al Unser Jr.	14	(United States) A. J. Foyt W	7	(United States) Danny Sullivan W
4	41	(United States) John Andretti	86	(United States) Dominic Dobson	12	(United States) Randy Lewis
5	16	(United States) Tony Bettenhausen Jr.	25	(United States) Eddie Cheever R	11	(United States) Kevin Cogan
6	23	(Finland) Tero Palmroth	19	(Brazil) Raul Boesel	51	(United States) Gary Bettenhausen
7	21	(Australia) Geoff Brabham	70	(Belgium) Didier Theys	28	(Canada) Scott Goodyear R
8	29	(United States) Pancho Carter	4	(Italy) Teo Fabi	39	(United States) Dean Hall R
9	9	(United States) Tom Sneva W	22	(United States) Scott Brayton	97	(United States) Stan Fox
10	20	(Colombia) Roberto Guerrero	15	(United Kingdom) Jim Crawford	40	(United States) Al Unser W
11	81	(United States) Bill Vukovich III	93	(United States) John Paul Jr.	56	(United States) Rocky Moran

=== Alternates ===
- Salt Walther (#77) – Bumped (first alternate)
- Jeff Andretti (#98) – Bumped (second alternate)

=== Failed to qualify ===
- Guido Daccò R (#66) – Passed rookie orientation
- Mike Groff (#10/#50) – Bumped
- Buddy Lazier (#91) – Bumped
- Johnny Rutherford W (#17T/#23) – Bumped, second attempt waived off
- Steve Chassey (#93/#96) – Wrecked practice
- Rich Vogler (#8/#12/#50) – Wrecked qualifying
- Jeff Wood R (#44) – Wrecked practice
- Bernard Jourdain (#69) – Wrecked practice
- George Snider (#51) – Withdrew, replaced
- Hiro Matsushita (#10) – Passed rookie orientation
- Steve Barclay R (#51) – Wrecked, rookie orientation
- Kenji Momota R (#98) – Did not appear for rookie orientation

== Race summary ==
=== Start ===
After rain on Saturday, race day dawned sunny and warm. Temperatures were higher than expected, which ultimately led to poor chassis set ups and handling problems for many drivers.

Emerson Fittipaldi took the lead from the start, and dominated the opening laps. The start was clean, and went 19 laps before the first caution. In turn one, Danny Sullivan's car broke a suspension piece, which sent his car spinning and he crashed hard into the outside wall.

=== First half ===
With Fittipaldi continuing to dominate, the top five was being battled amongst Bobby Rahal, Al Unser Jr., and Arie Luyendyk. Rick Mears dropped back with handling issues, and fell a lap down.

Tony Bettenhausen Jr. brought out the second caution, when he stalled in lap 45. He was towed back to the pits, and would continue for a time in the race. On lap 63, Mario Andretti and Raul Boesel suffered engine failures, and oil was reported on the track. At the same time, Pancho Carter slowed down the backstretch with a broken CV joint. In turn four, he spun due to the bad handling, and tagged the wall in turn 4. Carter was uninjured.

Emerson Fittipaldi continued to lead, and set a new Indy record by leading the first 92 consecutive laps. He lost the lead on lap 93 when he pitted. Arie Luyendyk took the lead for two laps, then relinquished the lead back to Fittipaldi when he himself pitted.

At the halfway point, Fittipaldi had led 98 laps and was averaging 174.192 mph, just shy of the race record.

=== Second half ===
Blistering tires began to be an issue with several drivers. The fast pace and the changing weather conditions were both factors. On lap 116, Emerson Fittipaldi ducked into the pits for a scheduled pit stop. That allowed Bobby Rahal to take the lead for the first time. The rest of the leaders cycled through stops, and Fittipaldi once again found the lead.

On lap 136, leader Fittipaldi suddenly entered the pits for an unscheduled pit stop. He was the victim of a blistered right rear tire. Bobby Rahal took over the lead, and began to pull away. Arie Luyendyk was now running second, with Fittipaldi dropping to third, just in front of fourth place Al Unser Jr.

On lap 140, John Andretti brushed the wall in turn four, damaging the suspension. He continued down the frontstretch, and spun lazily in turn 1. It would be the final caution period of the day. Leader Bobby Rahal pitted under the caution, taking on fuel and only two tires (right sides only). The team was expressing concern about changing all four, as many teams were blistering tires. Luyendyk, however, took on four tires and fuel. Rahal and Luyendyk came back out on the track in that order, a few cars ahead of third place Fittipaldi.

On lap 153, Fittipaldi was forced to make another unscheduled pit stop for yet another blistered tire. This time he fell a lap down. He slipped to fourth, with Al Unser Jr. passing him for third.

Bobby Rahal continued to lead, but handling problems were starting to slow his pace. Having taken on only two tires, coupled with a damaged wing adjuster, was causing a pushing condition. Arie Luyendyk began to reel him in, and took over the lead with a pass in turn three on lap 168. Going into the race, Luyendyk had never led a lap at Indy, and had never won an Indy car race.

=== Finish ===
Both Luyendyk and Rahal needed one final pit stop to make it to the finish. Rahal pitted first, on lap 171. Luyendyk followed two laps later, and was able to get back out on the track ahead of Rahal. With Al Unser Jr. 30 seconds behind in third place, and Fittipaldi now a lap down in fourth, the race became a two-man duel between Luyendyk and Rahal - with Rahal seemingly unable to close the gap. Some observers were unsure if Luyendyk and Rahal could make it to the finish on fuel, but neither team planned to pit.

In the final twenty laps, Luyendyk began to pick up the pace, and the average speed began to climb, well above the existing record. Al Unser Jr.'s chance at a third place were dashed when he was forced to make a pit stop for fuel on lap 187. Fittipaldi passed him for third, and set his sights on Luyendyk, trying to get his lap back. Luyendyk had begun to experience minor blistering on his tires, but not enough to cause concern. Rahal was still trailing in second place by over ten seconds.

With three laps to go, Luyendyk led Rahal by 13.3 seconds. Third place Emerson Fittipaldi caught Luyendyk, and was attempting to un-lap himself. After closely pursuing for a couple laps he made his move on Luyendyk. Fittipaldi did so on the main stretch with one lap to go, which distracted Luyendyk, and he did not see the white flag. The next time around, the checkered flag was displayed, and Luyendyk won his first-career Indy car race.

In victory lane an emotional Luyendyk was thrilled over his victory stating in a post-race interview: "I can't believe this. It feels like a dream. This is unbelievable. I don't care if we won by 60 miles per hour we still got first place and that's what counts."

Third place Emerson Fittipaldi was disappointed about not repeating his victory after dominating the race. “I’m very disappointed,” Fittipaldi said. “It was a shame. Everything was under control. The car, she was flying. It’s the third time I’ve been leading and something happened. It seems that for my wins here, I have to be striving and then I can win.”

=== Legacy ===
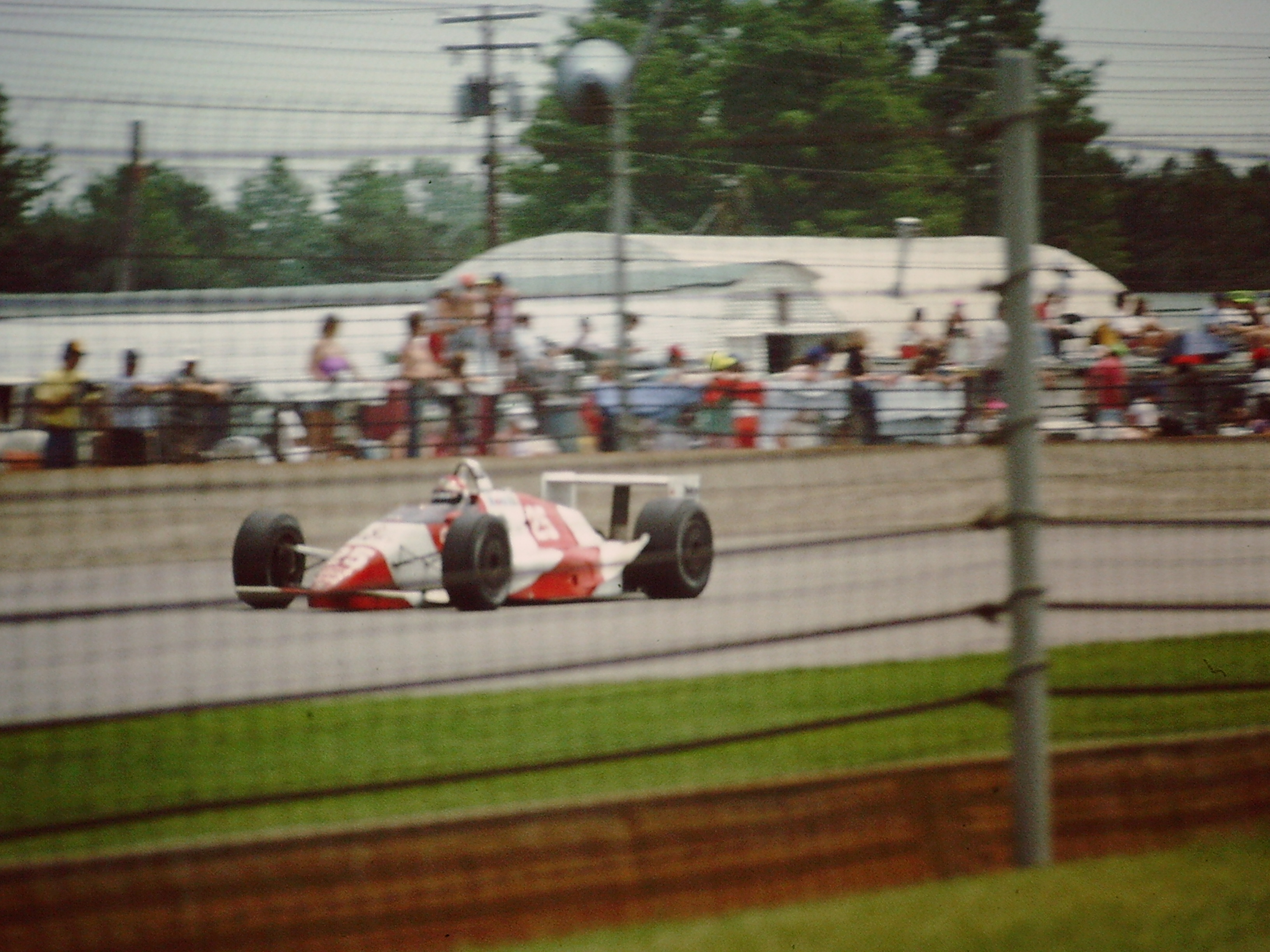
Eddie Cheever won the rookie of the year award.

The record average speed of 185.981 mph (299.307 km/h) marked the fastest Indy 500 to-date, and the fastest 500-mile Indy car race to-date. The 500-mile speed record would later be broken at the 1990 Michigan 500. The 1990 average speed record would stand until 2013.

Eddie Cheever was the highest finishing rookie in 8th place. He was also named the rookie of the year.

Luyendyk's win marked the lone victory for Lola at the Indianapolis 500 in the 1980s and 1990s. Lola returned to Indy car competition in 1983 with Mario Andretti, and quickly became a competitive chassis on the circuit. Despite the manufacturer's high level of success in the sport during that period, which saw six CART championships between 1984 and 1993, and saw them quickly displace March as the prominent customer chassis, Lola failed to win at Indianapolis again. The only previous victories to their credit at Indy were with Graham Hill in 1966 and with Al Unser Sr. in a modified Lola Chaparral in 1978. They would be upstaged numerous times by March, Penske and Reynard, until ceasing participation at the Indy 500 after 1996, as the race would come under the purvue of the Indy Racing League, which switched to a new engine and chassis formula in 1997 completely incompatible with CART.

== Box score ==
Finish	Start	No.	Name	Team	Chassis	Engine	Qual	Laps	Status
1	3	30	(Netherlands) Arie Luyendyk	Doug Shierson Racing	Lola T90/00	Ilmor-Chevrolet	223.304	200	185.981 mph
2	4	18	(United States) Bobby Rahal W	Galles-Kraco Racing	Lola T90/00	Ilmor-Chevrolet	222.694	200	+11.878 seconds
3	1	1	(Brazil) Emerson Fittipaldi W	Team Penske	Penske PC-19	Ilmor-Chevrolet	225.301	200	+41.719 seconds
4	7	5	(United States) Al Unser Jr.	Galles-Kraco Racing	Lola T90/00	Ilmor-Chevrolet	220.920	199	Flagged
5	2	2	(United States) Rick Mears W	Team Penske	Penske PC-19	Ilmor-Chevrolet	224.215	198	Flagged
6	8	14	(United States) A. J. Foyt W	A. J. Foyt Enterprises	Lola T90/00	Ilmor-Chevrolet	220.425	194	Flagged
7	26	22	(United States) Scott Brayton	Dick Simon Racing	Lola T90/00	Cosworth DFS	215.028	194	Flagged
8	14	25	(United States) Eddie Cheever R	Chip Ganassi Racing	Penske PC-18	Ilmor-Chevrolet	217.925	193	Flagged
9	15	11	(United States) Kevin Cogan	Vince Granatelli Racing	Penske PC-18	Buick V-6	217.738	191	Flagged
10	21	28	(Canada) Scott Goodyear R	Doug Shierson Racing	Lola T89/00	Judd AV	213.622	191	Flagged
11	20	70	(Belgium) Didier Theys	Vince Granatelli Racing	Penske PC-18	Buick V-6	214.033	190	Flagged
12	16	23	(Finland) Tero Palmroth	Dick Simon Racing	Lola T90/00	Cosworth DFS	217.423	188	Flagged
13	30	40	(United States) Al Unser W	Patrick Racing	March 90CA	Alfa Romeo	212.086	186	Flagged
14	12	12	(United States) Randy Lewis	Arciero Racing	Penske PC-17	Buick V-6	218.412	186	Flagged
15	29	15	(United Kingdom) Jim Crawford	Team Menard	Lola T89/00	Buick V-6	212.201	183	Flagged
16	32	93	(United States) John Paul Jr.	Mann Motorsports	Lola T89/00	Buick V-6	214.411	176	Flagged
17	24	39	(United States) Dean Hall R	Dale Coyne Racing	Lola T90/00	Cosworth DFS	216.975	165	Radiator
18	23	4	(Italy) Teo Fabi	Porsche Motorsports	March 90P	Porsche	220.022	162	Transmission
19	19	21	(Australia) Geoff Brabham	Truesports	Lola T89/00	Judd AV	216.580	161	Flagged
20	5	3	(United States) Michael Andretti	Newman/Haas Racing	Lola T90/00	Ilmor-Chevrolet	222.055	146	Vibration
21	10	41	(United States) John Andretti	Porsche Motorsports	March 90P	Porsche	219.484	136	Spun T1
22	11	86	(United States) Dominic Dobson	Bayside Motorsports	Lola T90/00	Cosworth DFX	219.230	129	Engine
23	28	20	(Colombia) Roberto Guerrero	Patrick Racing	March 90CA	Alfa Romeo	212.652	118	Suspension
24	31	81	(United States) Billy Vukovich III	Hemelgarn Racing	Lola T88/00	Buick V-6	211.389	102	Engine
25	33	56	(United States) Rocky Moran	Gohr Racing	Lola T89/00	Cosworth DFX	211.076	88	Engine
26	13	16	(United States) Tony Bettenhausen Jr.	Bettenhausen Motorsports	Lola T89/00	Buick V-6	218.369	76	Engine
27	6	6	(United States) Mario Andretti W	Newman/Haas Racing	Lola T90/00	Ilmor-Chevrolet	222.025	60	Engine
28	17	19	(Brazil) Raul Boesel	Truesports	Lola T89/00	Judd AV	217.381	60	Engine
29	22	29	(United States) Pancho Carter	Leader Card Racers	Lola T90/00	Cosworth DFS	213.156	59	Crash T4
30	25	9	(United States) Tom Sneva W	Vince Granatelli Racing	Penske PC-18	Buick V-6	216.142	48	CV Joint
31	18	51	(United States) Gary Bettenhausen	Team Menard	Lola T88/00	Buick V-6	217.264	39	Wheel Bearing
32	9	7	(United States) Danny Sullivan W	Team Penske	Penske PC-19	Ilmor-Chevrolet	220.310	19	Crash T1
33	27	97	(United States) Stan Fox	R Kent Baker Racing	Lola T87/00	Buick V-6	213.812	10	Gearbox

W Former Indianapolis 500 winner

R Indianapolis 500 Rookie

All cars utilized Goodyear tires.

=== Race statistics ===
Lap Leaders
Laps	Leader
1–92	Emerson Fittipaldi
93–94	Arie Luyendyk
95–117	Emerson Fittipaldi
118–122	Bobby Rahal
123–135	Emerson Fittipaldi
136–167	Bobby Rahal
168–200	Arie Luyendyk

Total laps led
Driver	Laps
Emerson Fittipaldi	128
Bobby Rahal	37
Arie Luyendyk	35

Cautions: 4 for 26 laps
Laps	Reason
20–25	Danny Sullivan crash in turn 1
45–51	Tony Bettenhausen stalled on track
63–69	Pancho Carter crash in turn 4
141–146	John Andretti spin in turn 1

== Broadcasting ==
=== Radio ===
The race was carried live on the IMS Radio Network. A new era arrived at the network for 1990. Lou Palmer and the Speedway management parted ways. Bob Jenkins, a veteran on the crew as a turn reporter, as well as his work on ESPN, was named the new chief announcer and newest Voice of the 500.

Brian Hammons, who previously worked as a pit reporter on the ABC-TV crew, moved over to the radio network for 1990. Bob Lamey moved from turn two to the turn four position (vacated by Jenkins), and would remain there until 2000. For 1990, the reporting location in turn four was slightly shifted down the track, closer to the exit of the turn. Newcomer Gary Lee took over turn two, still positioned atop Turn Two Suites.

Longtime broadcast member Ron Carrell, who debuted in 1965 and served as both a turn reporter and pit reporter over the years, would make his final appearance on the crew in 1990. Carrell would die at the age of 75 on the morning of the 2012 race.

For the second year in a row, Johnny Rutherford failed to qualify for the race. As he did in 1989, he joined the radio crew as "driver expert". Bob Forbes conducted the winner's interview in victory lane. One of the first noticeable changes Jenkins made to the broadcast was to eliminate commentary and reporting during the pre-race ceremonies. During the pre-race, the broadcast would instead simulcast the Speedway's public address system (Tom Carnegie, Jim Phillipe, John Totten, and Dave Calabro).

Luke Walton, who was a longtime fixture of the radio network, had only served in a limited pre-race role from 1983 to 1988. He was not part of the crew in 1989 nor 1990. Three weeks after the 1990 race, on June 18, 1990, Walton died at the age of 83.

Indianapolis Motor Speedway Radio Network
Booth Announcers	Turn Reporters	Pit/garage reporters
Chief Announcer: Bob Jenkins; Driver expert: Johnny Rutherford; Historian: Donald Davidson	Turn 1: Jerry Baker; Turn 2: Gary Lee R Backstretch: Howdy Bell; Turn 3: Larry Henry; Turn 4: Bob Lamey	Bob Forbes (north pits); Ron Carrell (center pits); Sally Larvick (center pits); Brian Hammons (south pits) R Chuck Marlowe (garages)

=== Television ===
The race was carried live flag-to-flag coverage in the United States on ABC Sports. Paul Page served as host and play-by-play announcer, accompanied by Bobby Unser and Sam Posey. For the first time, the race was advertised as being broadcast in stereophonic sound.

Pit reporter Brian Hammons departed, and was replaced by Gary Gerould (who switched over from the radio network). Jack Arute and Dr. Jerry Punch returned.

For the second year in a row, the telecast would go on to win the Sports Emmy award for "Outstanding Live Sports Special." For the first time, on board telemetry was featured in one of the cars (Teo Fabi). In addition, the first "crew cam" was mounted on the headset of a pit crew member (for the car of Emerson Fittipaldi).

ABC Television
Booth Announcers	Pit/garage reporters
Host/Announcer: Paul Page; Color: Sam Posey; Color: Bobby Unser	Jack Arute; Gary Gerould; Dr. Jerry Punch

== 1989–90 USAC Gold Crown Championship ==
1989–90 USAC Championship Car season
- USAC Gold Crown Championship

Season
- Races: 1

Awards
- National champion: (Netherlands) Arie Luyendyk

The 1989–90 USAC Gold Crown Championship season consisted of one sanctioned race. The schedule was based on a split-calendar, beginning in June 1989 and running through May 1990. Starting in 1981, USAC scaled back their participation in top-level Indy car racing, and ultimately ceased sanctioning races outside of the Indianapolis 500 following their 1983–84 season. Subsequently, the Gold Crown Championship would consist of only one event annually; the winner of the Indianapolis 500 would be the de facto Gold Crown champion, as it was their lone points-paying event. The preeminent national championship season was instead sanctioned by CART, and the Indy 500 paid championship points separately (on a different scale) toward the CART championship as well.

Arie Luyendyk, by virtue of winning the 1990 Indianapolis 500, also won the 1989–90 USAC Championship.

=== Final points standings (Top five) ===
Pos	Driver	INDY (United States)	Pts
1	(Netherlands) Arie Luyendyk	1	1000
2	(United States) Bobby Rahal	2	800
3	(Brazil) Emerson Fittipaldi	3	700
4	(United States) Al Unser Jr.	4	600
5	(United States) Rick Mears	5	500

== Selected rules and specifications ==
Engine regulations
Engine Type	Maximum Displacement	Turbocharger Boost
Turbocharged DOHC V-8	161.7 cu in (2.65 L)	45 inHg (1,500 mbar)
Turbocharged Stock Block V-6	209.3 cu in (3.43 L)	55 inHg (1,900 mbar)
Normally aspriated OHC	274.6 cu in (4.50 L)	—
Normally aspriated Stock Block	355.1 cu in (5.82 L)	—
Fuel	On-board capacity	Total allotment
Methanol	40 US gal (151.4 L)	280 US gal (1,100 L)

Rookie Test
Phase	Laps	Speed bracket
1	10	185–190 mph
2	10	190–195 mph
3*	10	195–200 mph
4*	10	over 200 mph

*Veteran Refresher tests consisted of Phases 3–4 of the rookie test.

== Notes ==
Previous race: 1990 Toyota Long Beach Grand Prix	CART PPG Indy Car World Series; 1990 season	Next race: 1990 Miller Genuine Draft 200
Previous race: 1989 Indianapolis 500; Emerson Fittipaldi	1990 Indianapolis 500; Arie Luyendyk	Next race: 1991 Indianapolis 500; Rick Mears
Preceded by 170.722 mph (1986 Indianapolis 500)	Record for the Indianapolis 500 fastest average speed 185.981 mph	Succeeded by 187.433 mph (2013 Indianapolis 500)
