= 1990 CART PPG Indy Car World Series =

American motorsport season

1990 CART season
- PPG Indy Car World Series
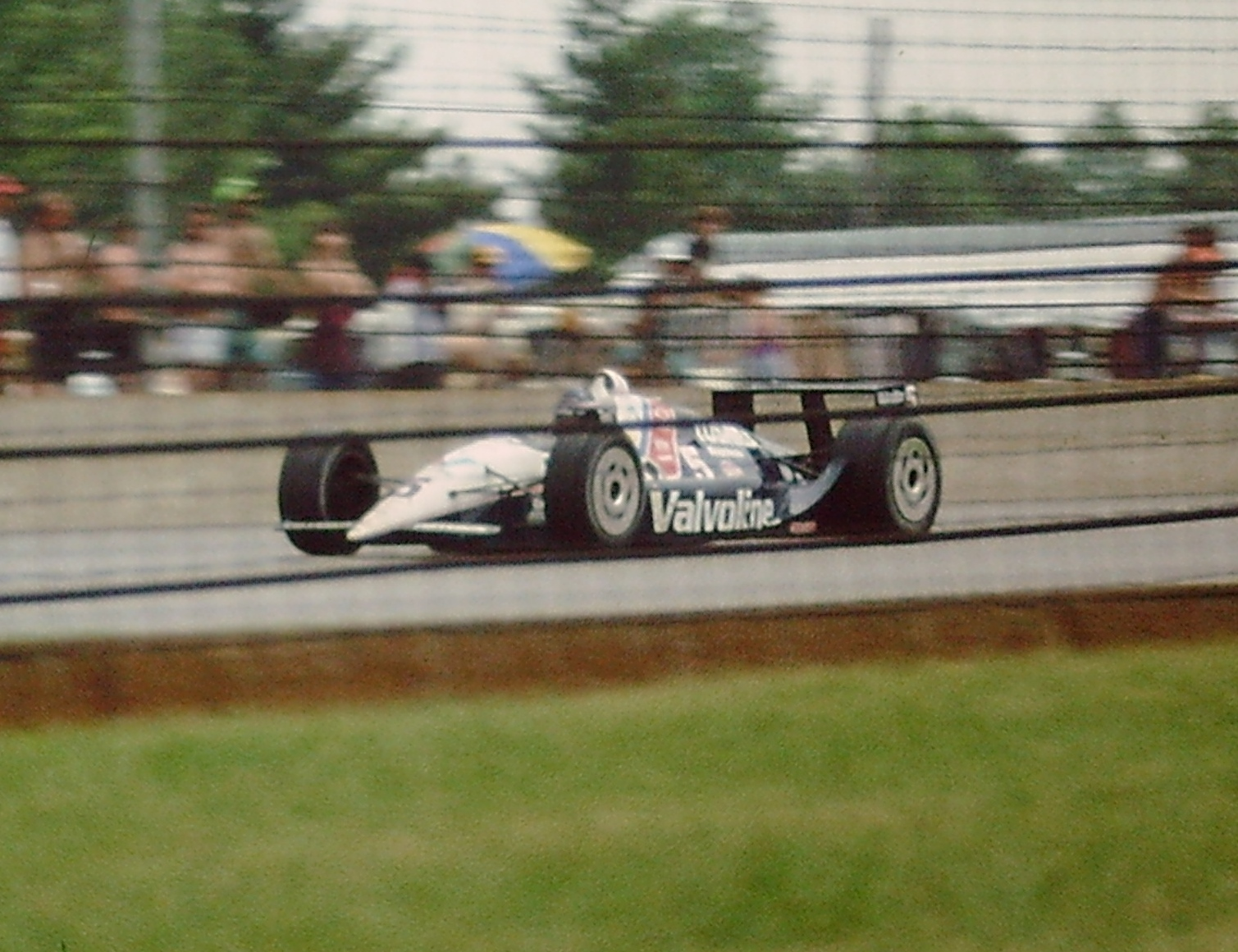
- Al Unser Jr.

Season
- Races: 17
- Start date: April 8
- End date: October 21

Awards
- Drivers' champion: (United States) Al Unser Jr.
- Constructors' Cup: (United Kingdom) Lola
- Manufacturers' Cup: (United States) Chevrolet
- Nations' Cup: United States
- Rookie of the Year: (United States) Eddie Cheever
- Indianapolis 500 winner: (Netherlands) Arie Luyendyk

The 1990 CART PPG Indy Car World Series season was the 12th national championship season of American open wheel racing sanctioned by CART. The season consisted of 16 races, and one non-points exhibition event. Al Unser Jr. was the national champion, and the rookie of the year was Eddie Cheever. The 1990 Indianapolis 500 was sanctioned by USAC, but counted towards the CART points championship. Arie Luyendyk won the Indy 500, his first-ever victory in championship-level competition, and the fastest 500 until the 2013 Indianapolis 500.

Al Unser Jr. won a total of six races, one pole position, and had a total of ten podium finishes en route to the championship. He finished 4th at Indy, and won his first career oval race a week later at Milwaukee. He also tied a series record by winning four consecutive races during a stretch in July–August. Unser's victory at the Michigan 500 was his first superspeedway win. Michael Andretti was Unser's nearest competitor, winning five races and four poles. Andretti narrowed Unser's points lead to 37 points with two key victories late in the season. In the second-to-last race of the season at Nazareth, Unser crashed out, giving Andretti a huge opportunity to close the gap. Andretti managed only a 6th-place finish, and could not capitalize on Unser's misfortune. Unser left Nazareth with a 27-point lead, enough to clinch the championship regardless of the results at the season finale at Laguna Seca.

For 1990, Bobby Rahal's team owned by Maurice Kranes merged with Rick Galles's and it became a two-car effort known as Galles-KRACO Racing. Al Unser Jr. and Rahal became teammates, and Rahal got use of the Chevy Ilmor V-8 engine for the first time. Despite the upgrade in equipment, Rahal suffered a snake bitten season in 1990, finishing second five times, including runner-up finishes at both the Indy 500 and the Michigan 500. Despite finishing in the points in 14 races, it was the first season of his Indy car career he failed to win any races, and he managed only a 4th-place ranking in the final championship standings. Other team and driver shifts for 1990 included shake-ups at Penske and Patrick. Emerson Fittipaldi left Patrick Racing to join the Penske, and the original Patrick Racing Team transferred ownership to Chip Ganassi to become Chip Ganassi Racing. Pat Patrick returned with a new team, taking over the Alfa Romeo Indy car effort.

This was the final year in which March Engineering chassis were run.

== Drivers and constructors ==
The following teams and drivers competed for the 1990 Indy Car World Series. All cars used Goodyear tires.

Team	Chassis	Engine	No	Drivers	Notes
(United States) Newman/Haas Racing	Lola	Chevrolet	3	(United States) Michael Andretti	All
(United States) Newman/Haas Racing	Lola	Chevrolet	6	(United States) Mario Andretti	All
(United States) Doug Shierson Racing	Lola	Judd	11/28	(Canada) Scott Goodyear	All
(United States) Doug Shierson Racing	Lola	Chevrolet	30	(Netherlands) Arie Luyendyk	All
(United States) Patrick Racing	March/ Lola	Alfa Romeo	20	(Colombia) Roberto Guerrero	All except 9
(United States) Patrick Racing	March/ Lola	Alfa Romeo	40	(United States) Al Unser	3, 10
(United States) Porsche North America	March	Porsche	4	(Italy) Teo Fabi	All
(United States) Porsche North America	March	Porsche	41	(United States) John Andretti	All
(United States) Team Penske	Penske	Chevrolet	1	(Brazil) Emerson Fittipaldi	All
(United States) Team Penske	Penske	Chevrolet	2	(United States) Rick Mears	All
(United States) Team Penske	Penske	Chevrolet	7	(United States) Danny Sullivan	All
(United States) Galles-Kraco Racing	Lola	Chevrolet	5	(United States) Al Unser Jr.	All
(United States) Galles-Kraco Racing	Lola	Chevrolet	18	(United States) Bobby Rahal	All
(United States) Truesports	Lola	Judd	8/19	(Brazil) Raul Boesel	All
(United States) Truesports	Lola	Judd	21	(Australia) Geoff Brabham	3
(United States) Chip Ganassi Racing	Penske/Lola	Chevrolet	15/25	(United States) Eddie Cheever	All
(United States) Leader Card Racing	Lola	Cosworth	29	(United States) Pancho Carter	1, 3-10
(United States) Leader Card Racing	Lola	Cosworth	29	(United States) Wally Dallenbach Jr.	11, 13, 16
(United States) U.S. Engineering	Lola	Cosworth	44	(United States) Jeff Wood	1, 3, 5, 7-11, 13-14, 16
(United States) Bettenhausen Motorsports	Lola	Cosworth/Buick	16	(United States) Tony Bettenhausen Jr.	All except 1, 12, and 16
(United States) Bettenhausen Motorsports	Lola	Cosworth/Buick	16	(Italy) Guido Daccò	2
(Italy) Euromotorsport	Lola	Cosworth	50	(Italy) Guido Daccò	1
(Italy) Euromotorsport	Lola	Cosworth	50	(United States) Mike Groff	3, 5-16
(United States) Greenfield Engineering	Lola	Cosworth	42	(United States) Michael Greenfield	4, 7-9, 11, 13-15
(United States) Team Menard	Lola	Buick	51/15	(United Kingdom) Jim Crawford	1, 3
(United States) Team Menard	Lola	Buick	51	(United States) Gary Bettenhausen	3
(United States) Arciero Racing	Penske	Buick/Cosworth	12	(United States) Randy Lewis	All
(United States) Arciero Racing	Penske	Buick/Cosworth	24	(United States) Steve Bren	2
(United States) Arciero Racing	Penske	Buick/Cosworth	24	(United States) Buddy Lazier	10
(United States) Arciero Racing	Penske	Buick/Cosworth	8	(United States) Rich Vogler	3
(United States) Dick Simon Racing	Lola	Cosworth	10	(Japan) Hiro Matsushita	2, 5-6, 8, 11-16
(United States) Dick Simon Racing	Lola	Cosworth	22	(United States) Scott Brayton	All
(United States) Dick Simon Racing	Lola	Cosworth	23/10	(Finland) Tero Palmroth	3, 6, 8, 10
(United States) Dick Simon Racing	Lola	Cosworth	23	(United States) Joe Sposato	16
(United States) Dale Coyne Racing	Lola	Cosworth	19/39	(United States) Dean Hall	All except 15
(United States) Gohr Racing	Lola	Cosworth	56	(United States) Rocky Moran	3
(United States) Gohr Racing	Lola	Cosworth	56	(United States) Jon Beekhuis	10
(United States) Gohr Racing	Lola	Cosworth	56	(United States) John Morton	6
(United States) Gohr Racing	Lola	Cosworth	56	(Italy) Fulvio Ballabio	16
(United States) A. J. Foyt Enterprises	Lola	Chevrolet	14	(United States) A. J. Foyt	All except 15-16
(United States) A. J. Foyt Enterprises	Lola	Chevrolet	14	(Belgium) Didier Theys	16
(United States) Vince Granatelli Racing	Lola/Penske	Buick	9/70	(Belgium) Didier Theys	1-3, 5-9, 11-13
(United States) Vince Granatelli Racing	Lola/Penske	Buick	11	(United States) Kevin Cogan	3
(United States) Vince Granatelli Racing	Lola/Penske	Buick	9	(United States) Tom Sneva	3
(United States) Bayside Motorsports	Lola	Cosworth	86	(United States) Dominic Dobson	1-3, 5-6, 8-9, 11-12, 14, 16
(United States) P. I. G. Racing	Lola	Judd	31	(United States) Jon Beekhuis	2, 5, 9, 11-14, 16
(United States) Raynor Racing	Lola	Judd	25	(United States) Willy T. Ribbs	2, 5, 8-9, 11-13, 16
(United States) Mann Motorsports	Lola	Buick	93	(United States) John Paul Jr.	3
(United States) Hemelgarn Racing	Lola	Buick	71/81	(United States) Bill Vukovich III	3, 10
(United States) Hemelgarn Racing	Lola	Buick	71/91	(United States) Buddy Lazier	3, 5-7, 9, 11-15
(United States) Kent Baker Racing	Lola	Buick	97	(United States) Stan Fox	3
(United States) Andale Racing	Lola	Buick	69	(Mexico) Bernard Jourdain	3
(United States) Burns Racing Team	Lola	Judd	66	(Italy) Guido Daccò	3
(United States) TEAMKAR International	Lola	Cosworth	27/98	(United States) Jeff Andretti	3-4
(United States) TEAMKAR International	Lola	Cosworth	98	(Japan) Kenji Momota	3
(United States) Conseco Racing	Lola	Cosworth	17	(United States) Kevin Cogan	10
(United States) Conseco Racing	Lola	Cosworth	17	(United States) Johnny Rutherford	3
(United States) Walther Motorsports	Penske	Cosworth	77	(United States) Salt Walther	3, 10
(United States) Nu-Tech Motorsports	Lola	Cosworth	33	(Italy) Guido Daccò	5, 9, 14-16
(Canada) Spirit of Vancouver	Lola	Cosworth	27	(Canada) Ross Bentley	12

== Schedule ==
Two new races were added to the schedule in the form of street courses at Denver and Vancouver. Pocono was dropped from the schedule with the series citing safety concerns.

Icon	Legend
O	Oval/Speedway
R	Road course
S	Street circuit
NC	Non-championship race

Rd	Date	Race Name	Track	City
1	April 8	Autoworks 200	O Phoenix International Raceway	Phoenix, Arizona
2	April 22	Toyota Grand Prix of Long Beach	S Long Beach Street Circuit	Long Beach, California
3	May 27	Indianapolis 500*	O Indianapolis Motor Speedway	Speedway, Indiana
4	June 3	Miller Genuine Draft 200	O Milwaukee Mile	West Allis, Wisconsin
5	June 17	Valvoline Detroit Grand Prix	S Detroit Street Circuit	Detroit, Michigan
6	June 24	Budweiser/G. I. Joe's 200	R Portland International Raceway	Portland, Oregon
7	July 8	Budweiser Cleveland Grand Prix	S Burke Lakefront Airport	Cleveland, Ohio
8	July 15	Marlboro Grand Prix	S Meadowlands Street Circuit	East Rutherford, New Jersey
9	July 22	Molson Indy Toronto**	S Exhibition Place	Toronto, Ontario
10	August 5	Marlboro 500	O Michigan International Speedway	Brooklyn, Michigan
11	August 26	Texaco/Havoline Grand Prix of Denver	S Streets of Denver	Denver, Colorado
12	September 2	Molson Indy Vancouver	S Streets of Vancouver	Vancouver, British Columbia
13	September 16	Red Roof Inns 200	R Mid-Ohio Sports Car Course	Lexington, Ohio
14	September 23	Texaco/Havoline 200	R Road America	Elkhart Lake, Wisconsin
NC	October 6	Marlboro Challenge	O Pennsylvania International Raceway	Lehigh Valley, Pennsylvania
15	October 7	Bosch Spark Plug Grand Prix	O Pennsylvania International Raceway	Lehigh Valley, Pennsylvania
16	October 21	Toyota Monterey Grand Prix	R Laguna Seca Raceway	Monterey, California

* Indianapolis was USAC-sanctioned but counted towards the CART title.

** The Toronto race was supposed to run 183 miles, but was shortened by rain.

== Results ==
Rnd	Race Name	Pole position	Winning driver	Winning team	Race time
1	Autoworks 200	(United States) Rick Mears	(United States) Rick Mears	Team Penske	1:35:01
2	Toyota Grand Prix of Long Beach	(United States) Al Unser Jr.	(United States) Al Unser Jr.	Galles-Kraco Racing	1:53:00
3	Indianapolis 500	(Brazil) Emerson Fittipaldi	(Netherlands) Arie Luyendyk	Doug Shierson Racing	2:41:48
4	Miller Genuine Draft 200	(United States) Rick Mears	(United States) Al Unser Jr.	Galles-Kraco Racing	1:29:46
5	Valvoline Detroit Grand Prix	(United States) Michael Andretti	(United States) Michael Andretti	Newman/Haas Racing	1:49:32
6	Budweiser/G.I.Joe's 200	(United States) Danny Sullivan	(United States) Michael Andretti	Newman/Haas Racing	1:48:22
7	Budweiser Cleveland Grand Prix	(United States) Rick Mears	(United States) Danny Sullivan	Team Penske	1:47:24
8	Marlboro Grand Prix	(United States) Michael Andretti	(United States) Michael Andretti	Newman/Haas Racing	1:52:34
9	Molson Indy Toronto	(United States) Danny Sullivan	(United States) Al Unser Jr.	Galles-Kraco Racing	2:13:26
10	Marlboro 500	(Brazil) Emerson Fittipaldi	(United States) Al Unser Jr.	Galles-Kraco Racing	2:38:07
11	Texaco/Havoline Grand Prix of Denver	(Italy) Teo Fabi	(United States) Al Unser Jr.	Galles-Kraco Racing	2:08:00
12	Molson Indy Vancouver	(United States) Michael Andretti	(United States) Al Unser Jr.	Galles-Kraco Racing	2:08:13
13	Red Roof Inns 200	(United States) Michael Andretti	(United States) Michael Andretti	Newman/Haas Racing	2:19:27
14	Texaco/Havoline 200	(United States) Danny Sullivan	(United States) Michael Andretti	Newman/Haas Racing	1:53:00
NC	Marlboro Challenge	(United States) Michael Andretti	(United States) Rick Mears	Team Penske	0:39:06
15	Bosch Spark Plug Grand Prix	(United States) Bobby Rahal	(Brazil) Emerson Fittipaldi	Team Penske	1:46:28
16	Champion Spark Plug 300K	(United States) Danny Sullivan	(United States) Danny Sullivan	Team Penske	1:47:45

=== Final driver standings ===
Pos	Driver	PHX	LBH	INDY	MIL	DET	POR	CLE	MEA	TOR	MIS	DEN	VAN	MOH	ROA	MAR	NAZ	LAG	Pts
1	(United States) Al Unser Jr.	3	**1***	4	1	27	3	15*	11	1*	1	1*	1*	3	4	3	16	2	210
2	(United States) Michael Andretti	20	4	20	5*	**1***	1*	25	**1***	2	15	5	**20**	**1***	1	**6***	5	3	181
3	(United States) Rick Mears	**1***	6	5	**2**	4	5	**8**	2	12	14	7	4	7	3	1	2	4	168
4	(United States) Bobby Rahal	2	12	2	4	2	11	2	25	22	2	3	8	6	7	7	**3**	5	153
5	(Brazil) Emerson Fittipaldi	5	2	**3***	3	7	9	3	6	20	**17***	18	6	12	2	2	1*	6	144
6	(United States) Danny Sullivan	6	3	32	8	14	**4**	1	14	**4**	21	2	2	5	**16***	8	18	**1***	139
7	(United States) Mario Andretti	4	5	27	21	25	2	4	24	6	3	4	3	2	5	5	4	26	136
8	(Netherlands) Arie Luyendyk	9	7	1	19	5	6	6	4	5	19	13	26	21	6	4	17	9	90
9	(United States) Eddie Cheever RY	7	13	8	11	3	19	16	21	3	4	20	14	4	9	10	6	10	80
10	(United States) John Andretti	17	21	21	7	22	21	5	7	13	7	6	5	13	22		19	8	51
11	(United States) A. J. Foyt	22	24	6	9	17	10	7	5	16	6	10	13	15	20				42
12	(Brazil) Raul Boesel	18	8	28	6	6	18	20	13	10	9	28	19	9	10		8	11	42
13	(Canada) Scott Goodyear	10	17	10	10	8	22	18	17	9	10	8	7	22	12		10	14	36
14	(Italy) Teo Fabi	24	10	18	12	24	7	13	3	15	24	**27**	16	19	25	9	11	7	33
15	(United States) Scott Brayton	13	9	7	20	10	25	22	9	14	16	12	9	8	13		12	24	28
16	(Colombia) Roberto Guerrero	16	14	23	18	21	8	19	15		5	17	24	26	8		9	18	24
17	(United States) Mike Groff R			DNQ		15	23	9	26	11	11	14	22	10	17		7	15	17
18	(Belgium) Didier Theys	14	11	11		13	20	23	28	7		9	25	16				12	15
19	(United States) Dominic Dobson	23	15	22		26	24		8	8		25	11		19			20	12
20	(United States) Pancho Carter	8		29	15	9	15	14	18	18	18								9
21	(United States) Jon Beekhuis		16			18				25	8	22	21	24	11			27	7
22	(United States) Jeff Wood	11		DNQ		11		10	20	24	25	19		14	23			19	7
23	(United States) Kevin Cogan			9							20								4
24	(United States) Tony Bettenhausen Jr.		Wth	26	13	16	17	12	10	26	22	24		20	DNS		22		4
25	(United States) Dean Hall R	15	18	17	16	23	14	11	19	19	23	23	15	11	15			21	4
26	(United States) Willy T. Ribbs R		20			20			23	27		26	10	27				13	3
27	(United States) Wally Dallenbach Jr.											11		18				25	2
28	(United States) Randy Lewis	21	22	14	14	12	16	21	22	17	12	16	17	28	21		20	22	2
29	(Italy) Guido Daccò	12	23	Wth		DNQ				23					14		13	16	1
30	(United States) Buddy Lazier R			DNQ		DNQ	13	24		DNS	26	DNS	12	23	DNS		14		1
31	(Japan) Hiro Matsushita R	Wth	19			19	12		16			15	23	17	18		21	23	1
32	(United States) Michael Greenfield R				Wth			17	12	21		21		25	24		15		1
33	(Finland) Tero Palmroth			12		28			27		Wth								1
34	(United States) Bill Vukovich III			24							13								0
35	(United States) Al Unser			13							Wth								0
36	(United Kingdom) Jim Crawford	19		15															0
37	(United States) John Paul Jr.			16															0
38	(United States) Jeff Andretti R			DNQ	17														0
39	(United States) Joe Sposato R																	17	0
40	(Canada) Ross Bentley R												18						0
41	(Australia) Geoff Brabham			19															0
42	(United States) Steve Bren		25																0
43	(United States) Rocky Moran			25															0
44	(United States) Tom Sneva			30															0
45	(United States) Gary Bettenhausen			31															0
46	(United States) Stan Fox			33															0
-	(United States) Salt Walther			DNQ							Wth								0
-	(United States) Johnny Rutherford			DNQ															0
-	(United States) Rich Vogler			DNQ															0
-	(United States) John Morton					DNQ													0
-	(Italy) Fulvio Ballabio																	DNQ	0
-	(United States) Steve Chassey			Wth															0
-	(Mexico) Bernard Jourdain			Wth															0
Pos	Driver	PHX	LBH	INDY	MIL	DET	POR	CLE	MEA	TOR	MIS	DEN	VAN	MOH	ROA	MAR	NAZ	LAG	Pts

Color	Result
Gold	Winner
Silver	2nd place
Bronze	3rd place
Green	4th-6th place
Light Blue	7th-12th place
Dark Blue	Finished (Outside Top 12)
Purple	Did not finish
Red	Did not qualify (DNQ)
Brown	Withdrawn (Wth)
Black	Disqualified (DSQ)
White	Did not start (DNS)
Blank	Did not participate (DNP)
Blank	Not competing

**In-line notation**
**Bold**	Pole position
Italics	Ran fastest race lap
*	Led most race laps
RY	Rookie of the Year
R	Rookie

=== Nations' Cup ===
- Top result per race counts towards Nations' Cup.

Pos	Country	PHX	LBH	INDY	MIL	DET	POR	CLE	MEA	TOR	MIC	DEN	VAN	MOH	ROA	NAZ	LAG	Pts
1	United States	1	1	2	1	1	1	1	1	1	1	1	1	1	1	2	1	312
2	Brazil	5	2	3	3	6	9	3	6	10	9	18	6	9	2	1	6	151
3	Netherlands	9	7	1	19	5	6	6	4	5	19	13	26	21	6	17	9	90
4	Canada	10	16	10	10	8	22	18	17	9	10	8	7	22	12	10	14	39
5	Italy	12	10	18	12	24	7	13	3	15	24	27	16	19	14	11	7	33
6	Colombia	16	14	23	18	21	8	19	15		5	17	24	26	8	9	18	24
7	Belgium	14	11	11		13	20	23	28	7		9	25	16			12	15
8	Japan		19	DNQ		19	12		16			15	23	17	18	21	23	1
9	Finland			12		28			27		DNS							1
10	Scotland	19		15														0
11	Australia			19														0
	Mexico			DNQ														0
Pos	Country	PHX (United States)	LBH (United States)	INDY (United States)	MIL (United States)	DET (United States)	POR (United States)	CLE (United States)	MEA (United States)	TOR (Canada)	MIC (United States)	DEN (United States)	VAN (Canada)	MOH (United States)	ROA (United States)	NAZ (United States)	LAG (United States)	Pts

=== Chassis Constructors' Cup ===
Pos	Chassis	Pts
1	(United Kingdom) Lola T9000/T8900/T8800/T8700	318
2	(United States) Penske PC-19/PC-18/PC-17	264
3	(United Kingdom) March 90P/90CA/89P	75
Pos	Chassis	Pts

=== Engine Manufacturers' Cup ===
Pos	Engine	Pts
1	(United States) Chevrolet A	351
2	(Germany) Porsche	72
3	(United Kingdom) Cosworth DFS/TC/DFX	72
3	(United Kingdom) Judd	59
4	(Italy) Alfa Romeo	24
5	(United States) Buick	22
Pos	Engine	Pts

== See also ==
- 1990 Indianapolis 500
- 1990 American Racing Series season
