= 1989 CART PPG Indy Car World Series =

American motorsport season

1989 CART season
- PPG Indy Car World Series
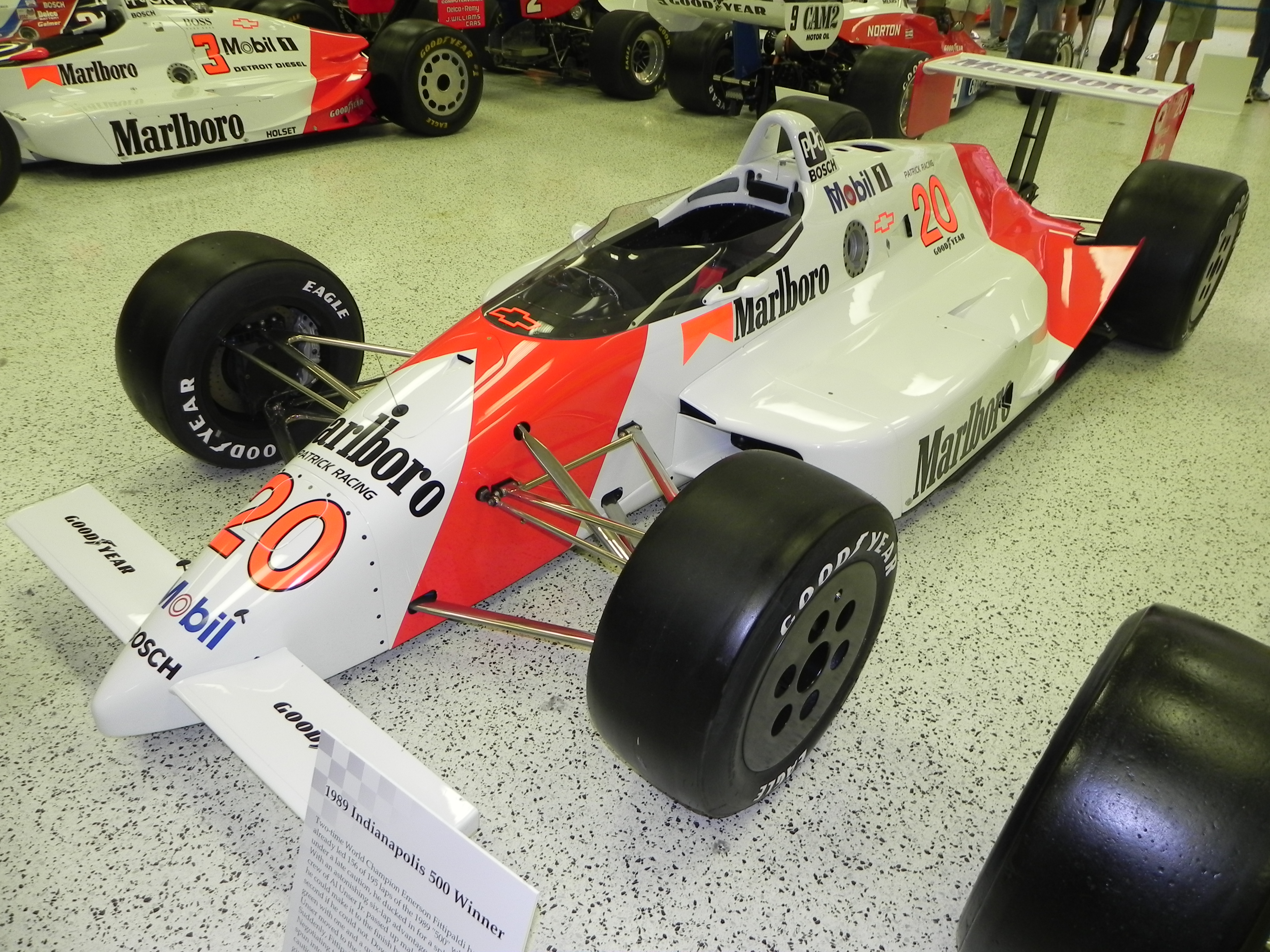
- Emerson Fittipaldi

Season
- Races: 16
- Start date: April 9
- End date: October 15

Awards
- Drivers' champion: (Brazil) Emerson Fittipaldi
- Constructors' Cup: (United States) Penske
- Manufacturers' Cup: (United States) Chevrolet
- Nations' Cup: United States
- Rookie of the Year: (Mexico) Bernard Jourdain
- Indianapolis 500 winner: (Brazil) Emerson Fittipaldi

The 1989 CART PPG Indy Car World Series season was the 11th national championship season of American open wheel racing sanctioned by CART. The season consisted of 15 races, and one non-points exhibition event. Emerson Fittipaldi was the national champion, and the rookie of the year was Bernard Jourdain. Fittipaldi became the second driver after Mario Andretti to win the Formula One World Championship and the CART championship.

The 1989 Indianapolis 500 was sanctioned by USAC, but counted towards the CART points championship. Emerson Fittipaldi won the Indy 500, and would later become the first driver since Bobby Rahal in 1986 to win Indy and the CART championship in the same season.

Emerson Fittipaldi won a total of five races, four pole positions, and had a total of eight podium finishes en route to the championship. Rick Mears won three races, and had a total of 14 top ten finishes, more consistent than Fittipaldi. The championship battle came down to those two drivers. In the second-to-last race of the season at Nazareth, Fittipaldi and Mears finished 1st-2nd. Fittipaldi effectively clinched the championship by virtue of a now 22-point lead over Mears. If Mears were to win the season finale at Laguna Seca, win the pole, and lead the most laps, he could tie Fittipaldi in points if Fittipaldi finished 13th or worse. However, Fittipaldi held the tiebreaker with 5 wins versus Mears with 3. Mears did all three at Laguna Seca (won the pole, won the race and led the most laps), but the tiebreaker scenario was moot as Fittipaldi managed a 5th place in the race. It was Mears' first road course victory since Riverside in 1982, and the first since he suffered serious leg injuries in 1984. It was also the last road course win of his career.

At Mid-Ohio, Teo Fabi scored the first and only win of the Porsche Indy Car team. Fabi had eleven top tens, and finished 4th in points. Cosworth unveiled a new engine, the "short-stroke" DFS to some fanfare, but little success. Bobby Rahal won one race in 1989 with the Cosworth DFS in July at the Meadowlands. It would stand as the only race victory for the DFS powerplant.

== Drivers and constructors ==
The following teams and drivers competed for the 1989 Indy Car World Series. All entries utilized Goodyear tires.

Team	Chassis	Engine	Car #	Drivers	Rounds
Full-time
(United States) Newman/Haas Racing	Lola	Chevrolet	5	(United States) Mario Andretti	All
(United States) Newman/Haas Racing	Lola	Chevrolet	6	(United States) Michael Andretti	All
(United States) Patrick Racing	Penske	Chevrolet	20	(Brazil) Emerson Fittipaldi	All
(United States) Galles Racing	Lola	Chevrolet	2	(United States) Al Unser Jr.	All
(United States) Team Penske	Penske	Chevrolet	1	(United States) Danny Sullivan	All except 6-7
(United States) Team Penske	Penske	Chevrolet	1	(Australia) Geoff Brabham	6
(United States) Team Penske	Penske	Chevrolet	1	(United States) Al Unser	7
(United States) Team Penske	Penske	Chevrolet	4	(United States) Rick Mears	All
(United States) Team Penske	Penske	Chevrolet	25	(United States) Al Unser	3, 10-11
(United States) Porsche North America	March	Porsche	8	(Italy) Teo Fabi	All
(United States) Truesports	Lola	Judd	3	(United States) Scott Pruett	All
(United States) Kraco Racing	Lola	Cosworth	18	(United States) Bobby Rahal	All
(United States) Dick Simon Racing	Lola	Cosworth/Buick	7/9	(Netherlands) Arie Luyendyk	All
(United States) Dick Simon Racing	Lola	Cosworth/Buick	22	(United States) Scott Brayton	All
(United States) Dick Simon Racing	Lola	Cosworth/Buick	28	(United States) Randy Lewis	All except 14
(United States) Dick Simon Racing	Lola	Cosworth/Buick	17	(United States) Joe Sposato	15
(United States) Doug Shierson Racing	Lola	Judd	30	(Brazil) Raul Boesel	All
(United States) Raynor Racing	Lola	Judd	10	(Republic of Ireland) Derek Daly	All
(United States) Machinists Union Racing	March	Cosworth	11	(United States) Kevin Cogan	All except 14
(United States) Machinists Union Racing	March	Cosworth	11	(United States) Johnny Rutherford	14
(United States) Machinists Union Racing	Lola	Cosworth	29/24	(United States) Pancho Carter	All
(United States) Protofab Racing	Lola	Cosworth	15	(United Kingdom) James Weaver	2, 5, 7
(United States) Protofab Racing	Lola	Cosworth	65	(Canada) John Jones	All except 14
(United States) A. J. Foyt Enterprises	Lola	Cosworth	14	(United States) A. J. Foyt	All except 7 and 15
(United States) A. J. Foyt Enterprises	Lola	Cosworth	14	(United States) Rocky Moran	15
(United States) A. J. Foyt Enterprises	March	Cosworth	29	(United States) Rich Vogler	3
(United States) Andale Racing	Lola	Cosworth	69	(Mexico) Bernard Jourdain	All except 13
(Italy) Euromotorsport	Lola	Cosworth	50/16	(Switzerland) Jean-Pierre Frey	1, 4-6
(Italy) Euromotorsport	Lola	Cosworth	50	(United States) Davy Jones	3
(Italy) Euromotorsport	Lola	Cosworth	50	(United States) Scott Atchison	6-8
(Italy) Euromotorsport	Lola	Cosworth	50	(Finland) Tero Palmroth	11
(Italy) Euromotorsport	Lola	Cosworth	50	(Italy) Guido Daccò	10, 12-15
(United States) Alex Morales Motorsports	March	Alfa Romeo	21	(Colombia) Roberto Guerrero	5-15
(United States) Arciero Racing	Penske	Cosworth	12	(Belgium) Didier Theys	1-4
(United States) Arciero Racing	Penske	Cosworth	12	(Italy) Fabrizio Barbazza	5-9, 12-13, 15
(United States) Arciero Racing	Penske	Cosworth	12	(United States) Rich Vogler	10
(United States) Hemelgarn Racing	Lola	Judd/Buick	71	(Canada) Ludwig Heimrath Jr.	1-4, 9-10, 12-15
(United States) Hemelgarn Racing	Lola	Judd/Buick	71	(Finland) Tero Palmroth	5
(United States) Hemelgarn Racing	Lola	Judd/Buick	71/91	(Belgium) Didier Theys	5-8
(United States) Hemelgarn Racing	Lola	Judd/Buick	91	(United States) Gordon Johncock	3, 10-11
(United States) Hemelgarn Racing	Lola	Judd/Buick	91	(Canada) Scott Goodyear	9, 13
(United States) Hemelgarn Racing	Lola	Judd/Buick	91	(United States) Robby Unser	15
(United States) Hemelgarn Racing	Lola	Judd/Buick	81	(United States) Bill Vukovich III	3
(United States) Vince Granatelli Racing	Lola/March	Buick/Cosworth	9	(Belgium) Didier Theys	12-15
(United States) Vince Granatelli Racing	Lola/March	Buick/Cosworth	9/70	(United States) John Andretti	3, 9-11, 14-15
(United States) Vince Granatelli Racing	Lola/March	Buick/Cosworth	9/7	(United States) Tom Sneva	1-8
Part-time
(United States) Bayside Motorsports	Lola	Cosworth	86	(United States) Dominic Dobson	1-3, 5-6, 8-9, 15
(United States) Dale Coyne Racing	Lola	Cosworth	19	(Italy) Guido Daccò	1-8
(United States) Dale Coyne Racing	Lola	Cosworth	19	(United States) Dale Coyne	11
(United States) Dale Coyne Racing	Lola	Cosworth	19	(Italy) Fulvio Ballabio	12-13
(United States) Dale Coyne Racing	Lola	Cosworth	19	(United States) Ken Johnson	15
(United States) Dale Coyne Racing	Lola	Cosworth	19	(United States) John Paul Jr.	10
(United States) ATEC Environmental	Lola	Cosworth	96	(Italy) Guido Daccò	9
(United States) Bernstein Racing	Lola	Buick	15	(United Kingdom) Jim Crawford	3
(United States) Saleen	March	Cosworth	59	(United States) Steve Saleen	2-3, 5, 7, 9, 12-13, 15
(United States) Gohr Racing	Lola/March	Cosworth	56	(United States) Jeff Wood	7-10, 12-15
(United States) Gohr Racing	Lola/March	Cosworth	56	(Finland) Tero Palmroth	2-3
(United States) Bettenhausen Motorsports	Lola	Cosworth	16	(United States) Jon Beekhuis	9, 13, 15
(United States) Bettenhausen Motorsports	Lola	Cosworth	16	(United States) Steve Chassey	8, 10
(United States) Bettenhausen Motorsports	Lola	Cosworth	16	(United States) Michael Greenfield	11
(United States) Bettenhausen Motorsports	Lola	Cosworth	16	(United States) Dennis Vitolo	5, 12
(United States) Bettenhausen Motorsports	Lola	Cosworth	15/16	(United States) John Paul Jr.	7-8
(United States) Bettenhausen Motorsports	Lola	Cosworth	27	(Italy) Fulvio Ballabio	2
(United States) Bettenhausen Motorsports	Lola	Cosworth	27	(United States) Tony Bettenhausen Jr.	11
(United States) Mann Motorsports	Lola	Buick	99	(United States) Gary Bettenhausen	3
(United States) Mann Motorsports	Lola	Buick	96	(United States) John Paul Jr.	5, 15
(United States) Mann Motorsports	Lola	Buick	96	(United States) Mark Dismore	12
(United States) Stoops Freightliner	Lola	Cosworth	17	(United States) Johnny Rutherford	10-11
(United States) Stoops Freightliner	Lola	Cosworth	17	(United States) Steve Butler	3
(United States) U.S. Engineering	Lola	Cosworth	44	(United States) Scott Harrington	3, 13, 15
(United States) U.S. Engineering	Lola	Cosworth	44	(United States) Phil Krueger	10
(United States) Team Lazier	March	Cosworth	35	(United States) Buddy Lazier	3
(United States) Curb Racing	March	Cosworth	33	(United States) Rocky Moran	3

== Schedule ==
Since Miami was dropped from the schedule the season finale and the Marlboro Challenge was moved to Laguna Seca. A race at Fuji Speedway in Japan was originally scheduled for March 26, but was eventually cancelled.

Icon	Legend
O	Oval/Speedway
R	Road course
S	Street circuit
NC	Non-championship race

Rd	Date	Race Name	Track	City
1	April 9	Checker Autoworks 200	O Phoenix International Raceway	Phoenix, Arizona
2	April 16	Toyota Grand Prix of Long Beach	S Long Beach Street Circuit	Long Beach, California
3	May 28	Indianapolis 500*	O Indianapolis Motor Speedway	Speedway, Indiana
4	June 4	Miller High Life 200	O Milwaukee Mile	West Allis, Wisconsin
5	June 18	Valvoline Detroit Grand Prix	S Detroit Street Circuit	Detroit, Michigan
6	June 25	Budweiser/G.I. Joe's 200	R Portland International Raceway	Portland, Oregon
7	July 2	Budweiser Cleveland Grand Prix	S Burke Lakefront Airport	Cleveland, Ohio
8	July 16	Marlboro Grand Prix**	S Meadowlands Street Circuit	East Rutherford, New Jersey
9	July 23	Molson Indy Toronto	S Exhibition Place	Toronto, Ontario
10	August 6	Marlboro 500	O Michigan International Speedway	Brooklyn, Michigan
11	August 20	Quaker State 500	O Pocono International Raceway	Long Pond, Pennsylvania
12	September 3	Red Roof Inns 200	R Mid-Ohio Sports Car Course	Lexington, Ohio
13	September 10	Texaco/Havoline 200	R Road America	Elkhart Lake, Wisconsin
14	September 24	Bosch Spark Plug Grand Prix	O Pennsylvania International Raceway	Lehigh Valley, Pennsylvania
NC	October 14	Marlboro Challenge	R Laguna Seca Raceway	Monterey, California
15	October 15	Toyota Monterey Grand Prix	R Laguna Seca Raceway	Monterey, California

* Indianapolis was USAC-sanctioned but counted towards the CART title.

** Meadowlands was supposed to run for 183 miles (295 kilometers) but was shortened due to rain.

== Results ==
Rnd	Race Name	Pole position	Winning driver	Winning team	Race time
1	Checker Autoworks 200	(United States) Rick Mears	(United States) Rick Mears	Team Penske	1:35:09
2	Toyota Grand Prix of Long Beach	(United States) Al Unser Jr.	(United States) Al Unser Jr.	Galles Racing	1:51:19
3	Indianapolis 500	(United States) Rick Mears	(Brazil) Emerson Fittipaldi	Patrick Racing	2:59:01
4	Miller High Life 200	(United States) Rick Mears	(United States) Rick Mears	Team Penske	1:32:11
5	Valvoline Detroit Grand Prix	(United States) Michael Andretti	(Brazil) Emerson Fittipaldi	Patrick Racing	2:02:11
6	Budweiser/G. I. Joe's 200	(Italy) Teo Fabi	(Brazil) Emerson Fittipaldi	Patrick Racing	1:55:20
7	Budweiser Cleveland Grand Prix	(United States) Michael Andretti	(Brazil) Emerson Fittipaldi	Patrick Racing	1:32:56
8	Marlboro Grand Prix	(Brazil) Emerson Fittipaldi	(United States) Bobby Rahal	Kraco Racing	2:09:20
9	Molson Indy Toronto	(Brazil) Emerson Fittipaldi	(United States) Michael Andretti	Newman/Haas Racing	2:01:00
10	Marlboro 500	(Brazil) Emerson Fittipaldi	(United States) Michael Andretti	Newman/Haas Racing	3:07:15
11	Pocono 500	(Brazil) Emerson Fittipaldi	(United States) Danny Sullivan	Team Penske	2:55:43
12	Red Roof Inns 200	(Italy) Teo Fabi	(Italy) Teo Fabi	Porsche North America	1:54:46
13	Texaco/Havoline 200	(United States) Danny Sullivan	(United States) Danny Sullivan	Team Penske	1:37:43
14	Bosch Spark Plug Grand Prix	(United States) Rick Mears	(Brazil) Emerson Fittipaldi	Patrick Racing	1:29:02
NC	Marlboro Challenge	(Brazil) Emerson Fittipaldi	(United States) Al Unser Jr.	Galles Racing	0:56:37
15	Champion Spark Plug 300K	(United States) Rick Mears	(United States) Rick Mears	Team Penske	1:58:29

=== Final driver standings ===
Pos	Driver	PHX	LBH	INDY	MIL	DET	POR	CLE	MEA	TOR	MIS	POC	MOH	ROA	NAZ	MAR	LAG	Pts
1	(Brazil) Emerson Fittipaldi	5	3	1*	16	1	1*	1*	**2**	**2**	**14**	**19**	4	5	1*	**8**	5	196
2	(United States) Rick Mears	**1***	5	**23**	**1***	5	8	5	4	5	7	2*	6	3	**2**	9	**1***	186
3	(United States) Michael Andretti	4	2	17	2	**13***	6	**18**	18*	1	1*	3	3	6*	5	7	7	150
4	(Italy) Teo Fabi	6	27	30	3	4	**4**	4	9	4	2	4	**1***	2	16	4	19	141
5	(United States) Al Unser Jr.	2	**1***	2	8	21	10	7	5	20	4	9	2	20	4	1*	3	136
6	(United States) Mario Andretti	8	18	4	7	3	25	2	20	26	3	5	7	7	8	5	2	110
7	(United States) Danny Sullivan	3	8	28	10	24			8	3*	23	1	5	**1**	3	2	14	107
8	(United States) Scott Pruett	11	DNS	10	5	2	5	6	3	6	17	8	19	8	6	6	4	101
9	(United States) Bobby Rahal	18	4	26	13	18	2	3	1	19	9	6	22	28	7	3	6	88
10	(Netherlands) Arie Luyendyk	17	7	21	6	6	3	9	7	24	6	23	8	4	13	10	9	75
11	(Brazil) Raul Boesel	14	6	3	4	28	7	8	6	7	20	20	23	9	11		10	68
12	(Republic of Ireland) Derek Daly	12	9	15	21	25	11	22	25	16	5	24	9	27	9		18	25
13	(United States) Pancho Carter	7	17	22	9	10	9	14	13	27	26	12	28	19	18		24	18
14	(United States) Kevin Cogan	10	26	32	19	17	24	11	12	9	25	22	10	18			8	18
15	(United States) Scott Brayton	15	12	6	18	Wth	13	28	10	14	11	14	15	13	10		20	17
16	(United States) Al Unser			24				10			8	7						14
17	(Canada) John Jones	16	20	11	11	11	19	25	11	18	16	10	13	10			22	14
18	(United States) A. J. Foyt	22	25	5	20	26	DNS		23	17	18	21	21	22	14			10
19	(United States) Dominic Dobson	23	19	18		7	18		17	11							11	10
20	(Mexico) Bernard Jourdain RY	19	13	9	12	15	22	19	19	10	19	11	27		15		23	10
21	(Belgium) Didier Theys	20	23	20	17	9	20	12	26				11	11	21		17	9
22	(United States) Davy Jones			7														6
23	(Colombia) Roberto Guerrero					8	23	13	22	28	22	16	12	21	20		25	6
24	(Italy) Fabrizio Barbazza					20	21	26	24	8			20	12			21	6
25	(United States) Rich Vogler			8							28							5
26	(Canada) Ludwig Heimrath Jr.	9	24	13	DNS	Wth				22	DNQ		25	17	17		DNQ	4
27	(United States) Johnny Rutherford			DNQ							10	13			DNS			3
28	(United States) Tom Sneva	DNS	10	27	22	23	26	20	27									3
29	(Italy) Guido Daccò R	24	22		14	12	12	21	DNQ	21	13		26	26	12		26	3
30	(United Kingdom) James Weaver R		11			22		24										2
31	(United States) Steve Saleen R		14	Wth		14		17		12			14	25			13	1
32	(United States) Jeff Wood							15	15	DNQ	12		16	15	Wth		DNQ	1
33	(United States) John Andretti			25						25	24	17			19		12	1
34	(United States) Bill Vukovich III			12														1
35	(United States) Randy Lewis	13	15	29	15	16	16	23	16	15	27	18	17	14			16	0
36	(United States) Jon Beekhuis R									13				24			15	0
37	(United States) Scott Atchison						17	27	14									0
38	(United States) Rocky Moran			14													28	0
39	(Australia) Geoff Brabham						14											0
40	(United States) Gordon Johncock			31							21	15						0
41	(Switzerland) Jean-Pierre Frey	21	DNQ		DNQ	DNQ	15											0
42	(United States) Phil Krueger			DNQ							15							0
43	(Finland) Tero Palmroth		16	16		27						25						0
44	(United States) John Paul Jr.			DNQ		19		16	21		DNQ						DNQ	0
45	(United States) Scott Harrington R			DNQ									DNQ	16			DNQ	0
46	(Italy) Fulvio Ballabio		21										18	DNQ				0
47	(United Kingdom) Jim Crawford			19														0
48	(Canada) Scott Goodyear									23				23				0
49	(United States) Mark Dismore R												24					0
50	(United States) Tony Bettenhausen Jr.			DNQ	DNS							26						0
51	(United States) Dale Coyne			Wth								27						0
52	(United States) Ken Johnson																27	0
53	(United States) Steve Chassey			DNQ					28		29							0
54	(United States) Gary Bettenhausen			33														0
	(United States) Dennis Vitolo					DNQ							DNQ					0
	(United States) Michael Greenfield			DNQ								Wth						0
	(United States) Buddy Lazier			Wth													DNQ	0
	(United States) Tom Bigelow			DNQ														0
	(United States) Steve Butler			DNQ														0
	(United States) Johnny Parsons			DNQ														0
	(United States) Joe Sposato																DNQ	0
	(United States) Robby Unser																DNQ	0
	(United States) Dick Ferguson			Wth														0
	(United States) Stan Fox			Wth														0
	(United States) George Snider			Wth														0
Pos	Driver	PHX	LBH	INDY	MIL	DET	POR	CLE	MEA	TOR	MIS	POC	MOH	ROA	NAZ	MAR	LAG	Pts

Color	Result
Gold	Winner
Silver	2nd place
Bronze	3rd place
Green	4th-6th place
Light Blue	7th-12th place
Dark Blue	Finished (Outside Top 12)
Purple	Did not finish
Red	Did not qualify (DNQ)
Brown	Withdrawn (Wth)
Black	Disqualified (DSQ)
White	Did not start (DNS)
Blank	Did not participate (DNP)
Blank	Not competing

**In-line notation**
**Bold**	Pole position
Italics	Ran fastest race lap
*	Led most race laps
RY	Rookie of the Year
R	Rookie

=== Nations' Cup ===
- Top result per race counts towards Nations' Cup.

Pos	Country	PHX (United States)	LBH (United States)	INDY (United States)	MIL (United States)	DET (United States)	POR (United States)	CLE (United States)	MEA (United States)	TOR (Canada)	MIS (United States)	POC (United States)	MOH (United States)	ROA (United States)	NAZ (United States)	LAG (United States)	Pts
1	United States	**1***	**1***	**2**	**1***	**2***	**2**	**2**	1*	1*	1*	1	2	**1***	**2**	**1***	276
2	Brazil	5	3	1*	4	1	1*	1*	**2**	**2**	**14**	**19**	4	5	1*	5	200
3	Italy	6	22	30	3	4	4	4	9	4	2	4	**1***	2	12	21	139
4	Netherlands	17	7	21	6	6	3	9	7	24	6	23	8	4	13	9	75
5	(Republic of Ireland) Ireland	12	9	15	21	25	11	22	25	16	5	24	9	27	9	18	25
6	Canada	10	20	11	11	11	19	25	11	13	16	10	13	10	17	15	18
7	Mexico	19	13	9	12	15	22	19	19	10	19	11	27		15	23	10
8	Belgium	20	23	20	17	9	20	12	26				11	11	21	17	9
9	Colombia					8	23	13	22	28	22	16	12	21	20	25	6
10	England		11			22		24									2
11	Australia						14										0
12	Switzerland	21		Wth	DNQ	DNQ	15										0
13	Finland		16	16		27						25					0
14	Scotland			19													0
Pos	Country	PHX (United States)	LBH (United States)	INDY (United States)	MIL (United States)	DET (United States)	POR (United States)	CLE (United States)	MEA (United States)	TOR (Canada)	MIS (United States)	POC (United States)	MOH (United States)	ROA (United States)	NAZ (United States)	LAG (United States)	Pts

=== Chassis Constructors' Cup ===
Pos	Chassis	Pts
1	(United States) Penske PC-18/PC-17	283
2	(United Kingdom) Lola T8900/T8800/T8700	254
3	(United Kingdom) March 89CE/89P/88C/86C	149
Pos	Chassis	Pts

=== Engine Manufacturers' Cup ===
Pos	Engine	Pts
1	(United States) Chevrolet A	319
2	(United Kingdom) Cosworth	146
3	(Germany) Porsche	141
4	(United Kingdom) Judd	138
5	(United States) Buick	16
6	(Italy) Alfa Romeo	6
Pos	Engine	Pts.

== See also ==
- 1989 Indianapolis 500
- 1989 American Racing Series season
