= 1991 Indianapolis 500 =

American motor race

75th Indianapolis 500
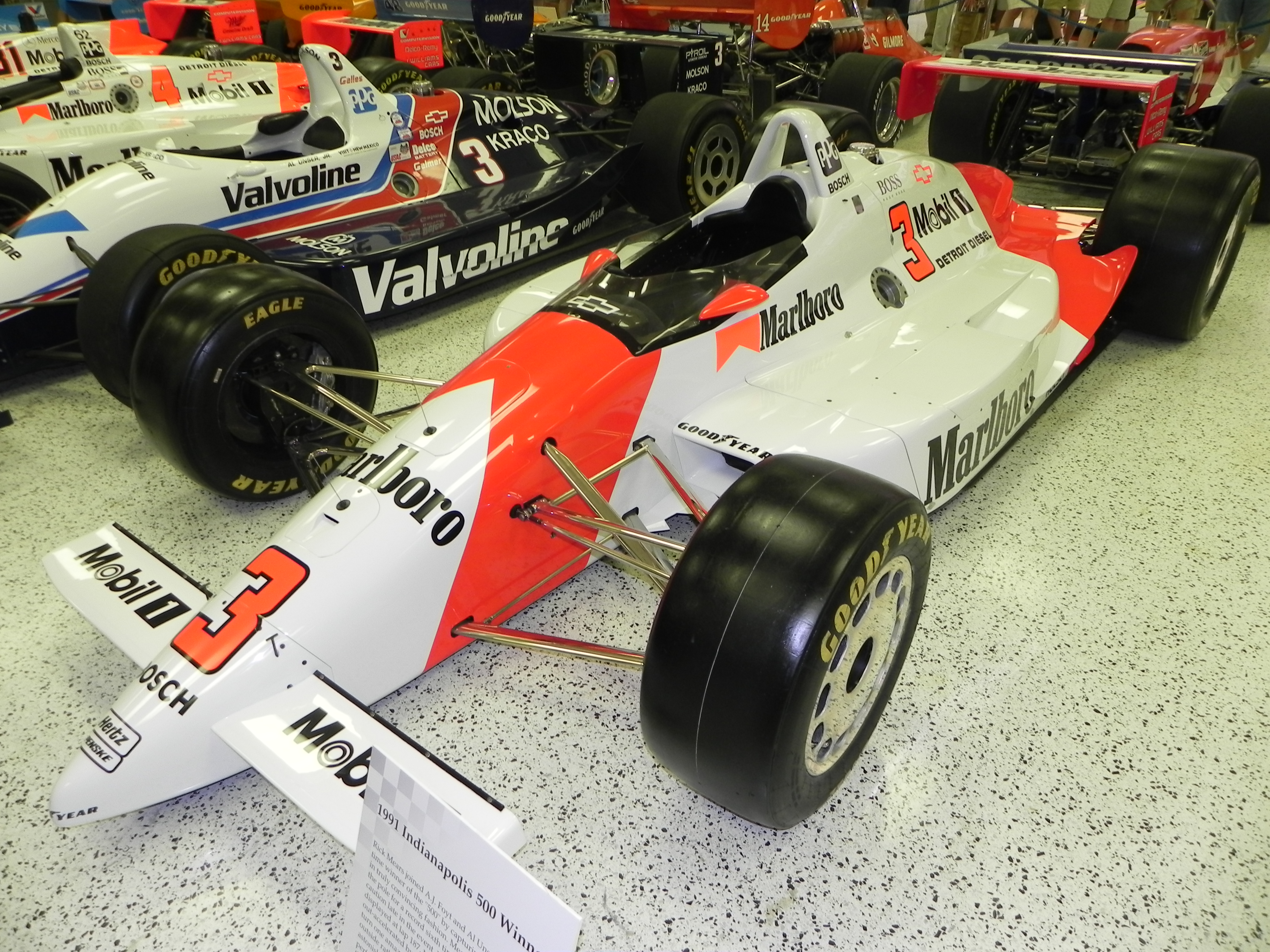

Indianapolis Motor Speedway

Indianapolis 500
- Sanctioning body: USAC
- Season: 1991 CART season 1990–91 Gold Crown
- Date: May 26, 1991
- Winner: (United States) Rick Mears
- Winning team: Team Penske
- Winning Chief Mechanic: Richard Buck
- Time of race: 2:50:00.791
- Average speed: 176.457 mph
- Pole position: (United States) Rick Mears
- Pole speed: 224.113 mph
- Fastest qualifier: (United States) Gary Bettenhausen
- Rookie of the Year: (United States) Jeff Andretti
- Most laps led: (United States) Michael Andretti (97)

Pre-race ceremonies
- National anthem: Sandi Patti
- "Back Home Again in Indiana": Jim Nabors
- Starting command: Mary F. Hulman
- Pace car: Dodge Viper
- Pace car driver: Carroll Shelby
- Starter: Duane Sweeney
- Estimated attendance: 300,000 (estimated)

Television in the United States
- Network: ABC
- Announcers: Host/Lap-by-lap: Paul Page; Color Analyst: Sam Posey; Color Analyst: Bobby Unser
- Nielsen ratings: 8.0 / 27

Chronology
Previous	Next
1990	1992

The 75th Indianapolis 500 was held at the Indianapolis Motor Speedway in Speedway, Indiana, on Sunday, May 26, 1991. Rick Mears won from the pole position, becoming the third four-time winner of the Indy 500, joining A. J. Foyt and Al Unser. During time trials, Mears also established an Indy record by winning his sixth career pole position. The month of May for Mears was tumultuous, as he suffered his first ever crash at Indy since arriving as a rookie in 1977. The wreck during a practice run totaled his primary car, and broke a bone in his right foot. Mears kept the injury mostly secret, and later admitted that the pain he experienced during the race was so bad, he had to cross his legs in the car and push the accelerator pedal down with his left foot.

The race was noteworthy in that it featured the first African American driver to qualify for the Indianapolis 500, Willy T. Ribbs. It also saw its first Japanese driver, Hiro Matsushita. The pre-race attention going into the month focused on A. J. Foyt, who announced that he would retire from driving after the end of the 1991 season. During time trials, Foyt qualified on the front row, his record 34th consecutive Indy 500 appearance. On race day, however, Foyt dropped out early due to suspension damage. He eventually retracted his retirement plans, and returned one final time in 1992.

During time trials, a sudden rain shower halted pole qualifying, unexpectedly shutting out several contenders from a chance at the front row. A number of top drivers were forced to qualify on the second day of time trials. Gary Bettenhausen in a Buick-powered machine was the surprise fastest qualifier, albeit he was ineligible for the pole position. For the first time in Indy history, four members of the same family qualified for the same race. Mario, Michael, Jeff, and John Andretti competed together. Michael, Mario, and John all finished in the top ten, while Jeff was named the Rookie of the Year. Michael Andretti led the most laps during the race and battled Rick Mears for the win in the closing stages. Andretti executed a daring pass for the lead on the outside of turn one on lap 187. Mears, however, made a similar pass one lap later to re-take the lead, and drove to victory. Michael's second-place finish would ultimately be his career best finish at Indy.

The race was sanctioned by USAC, and was included as part of the 1991 CART PPG Indy Car World Series. Morning rain delayed the start of the race by about 55 minutes. The rain stopped, the track was dried, and the race was run to completion without interruption. Later in the year, Rick Mears would also win the Michigan 500, sweeping both 500-mile races for the season, the final two victories of his racing career.

== Background ==
=== Pre May News ===
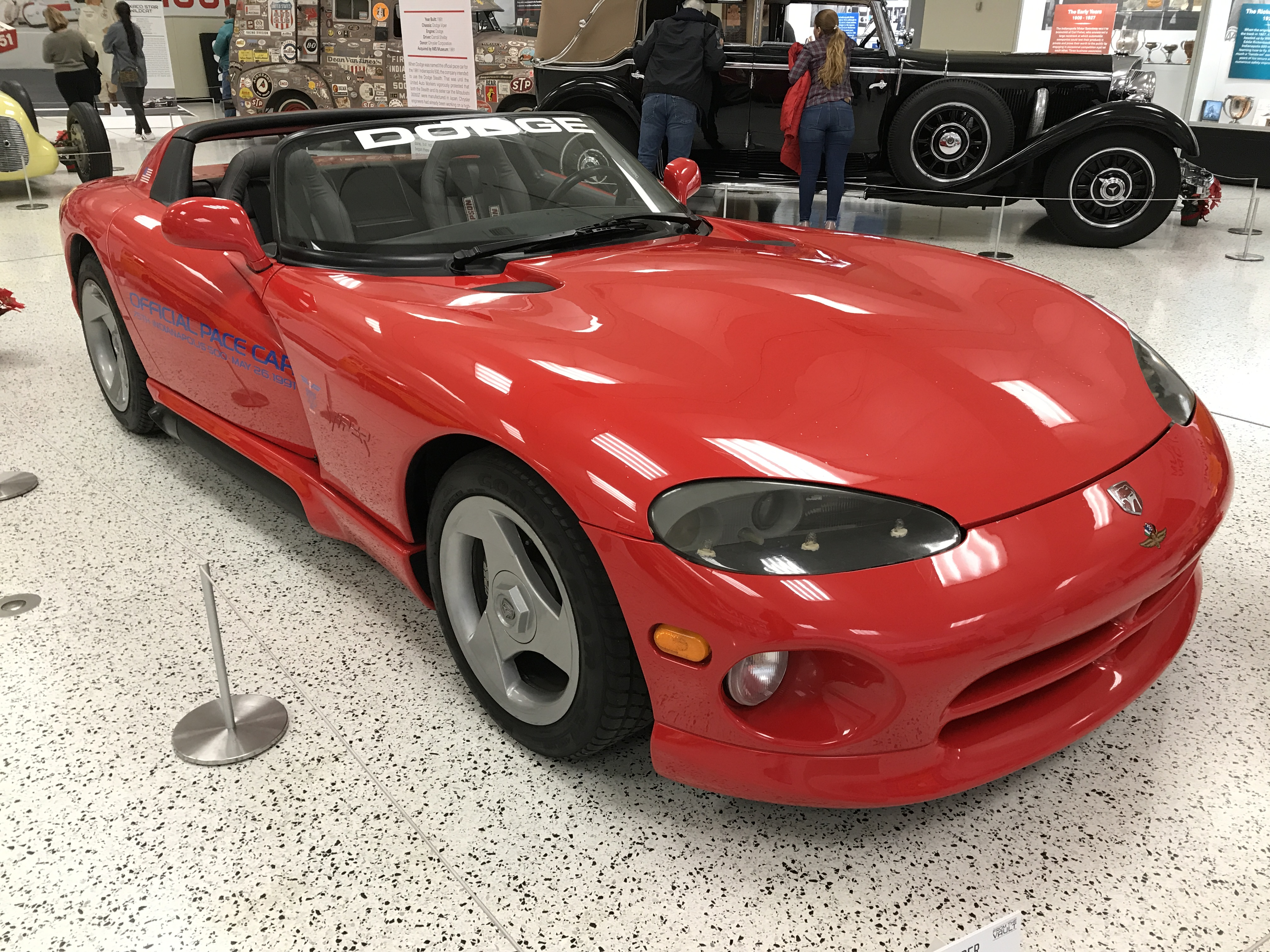
1991 Dodge Viper RT/10 Indy 500 Pace Car, on display at the Indianapolis Motor Speedway's "From the Vault" exhibit, December 2019

A. J. Foyt suffered a crash at Road America in September 1990, which seriously injured both his feet and legs. Foyt underwent rehabilitation during the offseason, supervised by Steve Watterson, the strength and rehabilitation coach for the Houston Oilers. Foyt announced in November 1990 that he would retire at the end of the 1991 season. Foyt was planning a part-time Indy car schedule for 1991, racing at some ovals and a few road courses, and the 1991 Indianapolis 500 would be his last start at Indy. Still unable to drive due to his recuperation, Foyt skipped the Daytona 500 in February, the first time that he missed that race since 1968. Foyt initially planned to race at Phoenix on April 21, but nevertheless took a very cautious approach to his return. He scheduled a private test at Indy on April 4–6, but had to cut the test short due to pain and other factors, and doctors refused to clear him to race. Al Unser filled in for Foyt at Phoenix. Bernard Jourdain and Mike Groff filled for Foyt at the other CART series races, with Jourdain running a second car at Indy. Foyt's comeback was finally complete when he took his first practice laps on Monday May 6.

Only a few team/driver changes occurred during the offseason, while most of the key fixtures from 1990 remained on the same respective teams. Among the handful of changes, Penske Racing reduced from a three-car team down to two cars. Danny Sullivan departed Penske, and joined the Pat Patrick Alfa Romeo effort. Rick Mears' familiar Pennzoil Z-7 Special livery was gone for 1991, as Marlboro sponsored both Penske team cars (Mears and Emerson Fittipaldi).

Doug Shierson Racing, who won the 1990 race with driver Arie Luyendyk, was sold to businessman Bob Tezak. The team was re-organized in a joint effort with Vince Granatelli, and re-booted as UNO/Granatelli Racing. The car's former sponsor Domino's Pizza left the sport, and the livery was changed to the classic day-glow orange utilized by Granatelli entries over the years. Luyendyk's services were retained for 1991 (he won earlier in the season at Phoenix), but the entry suffered from a lack of sponsorship. During most of the season, the car had blank sidepods, but RCA sponsored the entry at Indy.

John Andretti joined the newly rebooted Hall-VDS team, taking over the Pennzoil sponsorship. Andretti kicked off the season by winning his first (and only) career CART race at the season opener, the Gold Coast Grand Prix at Surfers Paradise.

Al Unser Jr. and Bobby Rahal returned together at Galles/KRACO Racing. Unser, the 1990 CART champion, won at Long Beach. Rahal started off the season finishing second at all three of the races prior to Indianapolis.

After sitting out the 1990 season due to injury, Scott Pruett was back behind the wheel at Truesports. The team introduced its brand new "All-American" Truesports 91C chassis, powered by Judd. For the second year in a row, veteran Geoff Brabham was entered at Indy only for a second team car.

Derrick Walker, formerly associated with the Penske and Porsche teams, entered rookie Willy T. Ribbs at Walker Racing. On a shoestring budget, the team was considered a long-shot to make the field.

=== Pace car controversy ===
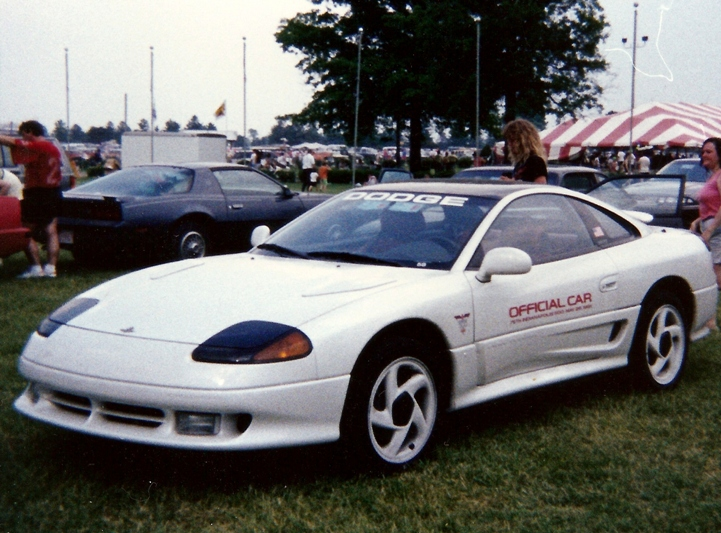
One of the Dodge Stealths used in the race festivities.

The pace car for the 1991 Indy 500 was initially chosen to be the Dodge Stealth. However, the UAW, along with fans and traditionalists, protested since the Stealth was a captive import built by Mitsubishi Motors in Japan. Traditionally, the make of the pace car has always been a domestic American brand. In late February, the Stealth was downgraded to be the "festival" (driven by the event's dignitaries for promotional purposes) and backup pace car. The pre-production Dodge Viper RT/10 replaced the Stealth as the official pace car when the track opened in May. Carroll Shelby served as the driver, thought to be the first person to drive the pace car after having a heart transplant. It was Shelby's second appearance at Indy. He had also driven the pace car in 1987, the last time the pace car was a Chrysler Corporation product. As the Viper did not begin production until later that year, the race winner would win the Stealth instead of the Viper, and dealers sold pace car replica editions of the Stealth.

=== Rule changes ===
Chief steward Tom Binford announced at the drivers meeting that cars were not permitted to run below the yellow line in turn four. In 1989–1990, officials threatened penalties for drivers going below the white line (which designated the apron) in all four turns. But that rule was abandoned once and for all in 1991 after it had proved to be impossible to enforce. Binford instead emphasized the single yellow line in turn four, which was meant to denote the bottom of the apron in that area of the course. Penalties might include a stop-and-go or a 1-lap penalty for "flagrant violation[s]" after warning.

== Race schedule ==
Race schedule — April/May 1991
Sun	Mon	Tue	Wed	Thu	Fri	Sat
21	22	23	34	25	26; ROP	27; ROP
28; ROP	29	30	1	2	3	4 Practice
5 Practice	6 Practice	7 Practice	8 Practice	9 Practice	10; Practice	11; Pole Day
12; Time Trials	13; Practice	14; Practice	15; Practice	16; Practice	17; Practice	18; Time Trials
19; Bump Day	20	21	22	23; Carb Day	24; Mini-Marathon	25; Parade
26; Indy 500	27; Memorial Day	28	29	30	31	

Color	Notes
Green	Practice
Dark Blue	Time trials
Silver	Race day
Red	Rained out*
Blank	No track activity

* Includes days where track
activity was significantly
limited due to rain

ROP — denotes Rookie
Orientation Program

== Practice - week 1 ==
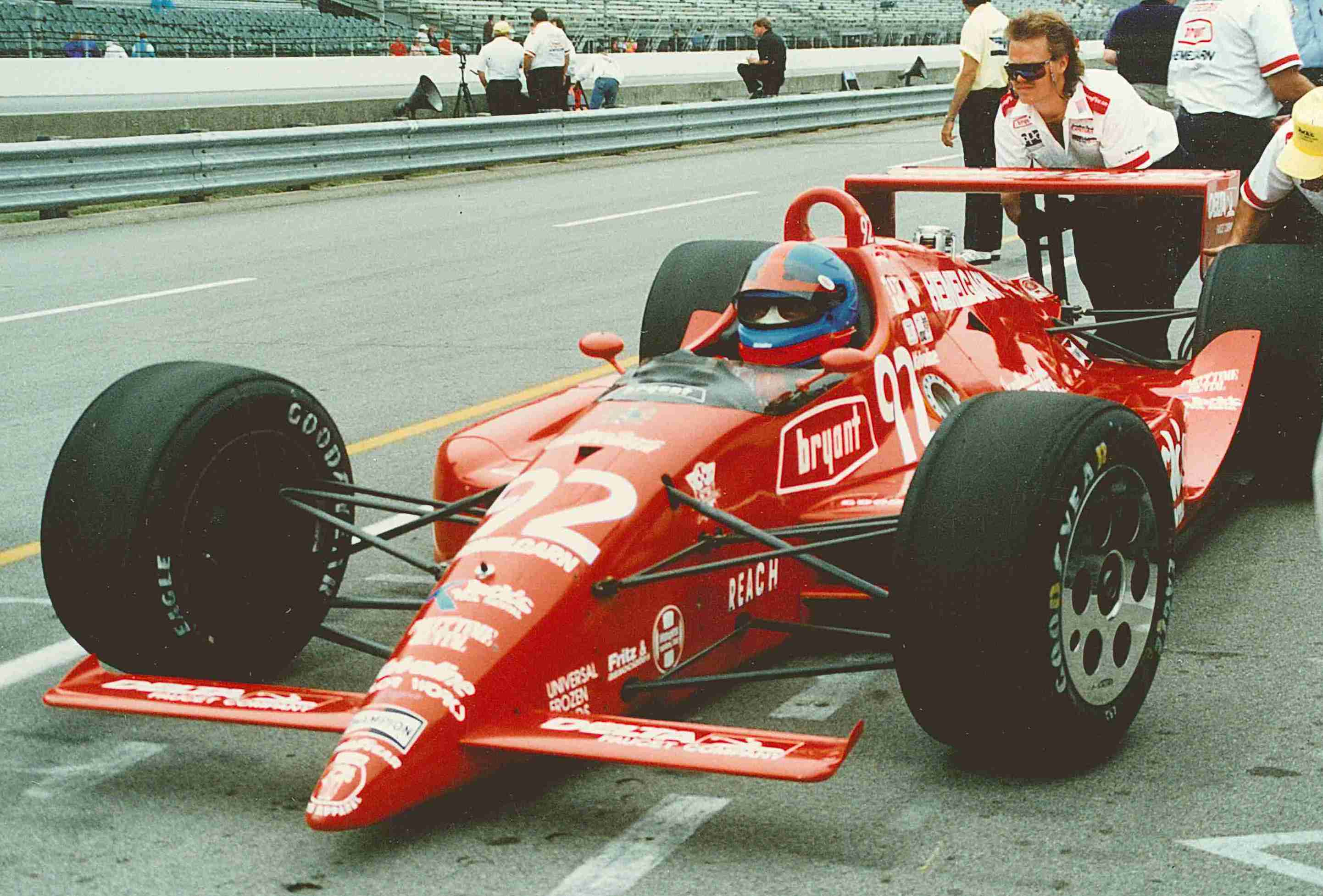
Gordon Johncock during practice.

The first two days of practice (May 4 & May 5) were rained out. The only on-track activity was brief. A limited number of cars took "shake down" laps, but no laps were run at speed.

=== Monday May 6 ===
The first hot laps were run on Monday May 6. Penske teammates Emerson Fittipaldi (223.981 mph) and Rick Mears (223.430 mph) led the speed chart.

=== Tuesday May 7 ===
Rick Mears ran the fastest lap thus far at 226.569 mph. Gary Bettenhausen also gained attention with a lap of 224.888 mph in the stock block Buick V-6.

=== Wednesday May 8 ===
Jim Crawford hit 225.643 mph in a Buick on Wednesday May 8, and Bobby Rahal became the second driver over 226 mph, with a lap of 226.080 to lead the speed chart for the day.

=== Thursday May 9 ===
The speed of the stock block Buicks continued to impress as Kevin Cogan turned a lap of 226.677 mph on Thursday May 9.

=== Friday May 10 - "Fast Friday" ===
On "Fast Friday," the final day of practice before time trials, Rick Mears shocked the establishment, suffering his first-ever crash at Indy since arriving as a rookie in 1977. During a practice run at 2:06 p.m., the locking pin on the right rear wheel sheared off, and his car was sent spinning into the turn one wall. Mears suffered an injured right foot, but was cleared to drive. Emerson Fittipaldi set the fastest lap of the month at 226.705 mph, and became the favorite for the pole. Mears returned to the track in the final hour in his back-up car. His lap of 226.557 mph was second-best for the day, and close to his personal best lap of the month.

At 5:09 p.m., rookie Mark Dismore suffered a terrible crash in turn four. Dismore grazed the outside wall at the exit of turn 4, which broke a right rear wishbone suspension piece. The car pivoted hard to the inside, cutting across the track. The car hit the inside wall with the back of the engine/transmission near the entrance to the pits, punching a 6-foot hole in the concrete barrier, and erupting a brief fireflash. The car then hit the end of the pit wall which separates the track from the pits. The car broke into two pieces, both tumbled down the pit lane. Dismore suffered multiple injuries to his arms, legs, feet, and a fractured neck. Dismore was sidelined for several weeks, but would recover. He attempted a return to Indy the following year, but failed to qualify. He eventually made seven starts at Indy between 1996 and 2002.

The area near the entrance to the pits was littered with debris, the inside wall was damaged, and the attenuator at the end of the pit wall was damaged. Due to lengthy cleanup, the track was closed for the day. As a result of Dismore's crash, officials made a quick change in the pits in the interest of safety for the crews. The two northernmost pit stalls were removed, and replaced instead at the south end of the pit lane. The move added about 80 feet of buffer from the track surface to the first pit box.

== Time Trials - First weekend ==
=== Pole Day - Saturday May 11 ===
Pole day was held on Saturday May 11, and conditions were hot and humid. A. J. Foyt drew #1 in the qualifying order, and was the first car out on the track. Foyt put himself on the provisional pole position, with a four-lap run of 222.443 mph. The second car out to qualify was Randy Lewis, who wrecked in turn one on his first lap.

About an hour into the session, Mario Andretti completed a run of 221.818 mph, which put him tentatively on the front row. Several cars waved off their runs, and others simply pulled out of line, preferring to wait until later in the day, anticipating better conditions. Bobby Rahal, Michael Andretti, and his brother rookie Jeff Andretti completed runs. By 12:45 p.m., there were only eight cars in the field.

At 12:51 p.m., Rick Mears took to the track, one day after suffering his practice crash. He qualified for the pole position with a speed of 224.113 mph. It was not a track record, but it would be Mears' record sixth Indy 500 pole. The track went mostly quiet during the heat of the day, and only two cars went out over the next 2½ hours.

At 3:52 p.m., Emerson Fittipaldi made his first attempt. After three laps in the 223 mph range (fast enough for second starting position, but not fast enough for the pole), his crew waved him off. Not realizing that storm clouds were hovering just to the east, the team planned to go out later and make another run at the pole position. A few minutes later, John Andretti completed his run under a light mist falling at the north end of the track. Lightning from the gathering storm clouds actually struck near turn 3 while the main straightaway remained awash in sunshine. The sun quickly gave way to the storm and the rain washed out the remainder of the day.

Since the original qualifying order had exhausted before the rains came, pole day was officially over. Only twelve cars qualified, and several drivers were left out, including Emerson Fittipaldi, Arie Luyendyk, and Gary Bettenhausen. Roger Penske was later presented with the dubious Jigger Award for having waved off Fittipaldi's run, and effectively giving up second starting position. Meanwhile, the front row was established with Rick Mears on the pole, A. J. Foyt in the middle, and Mario Andretti on the outside. Historians point to this as one of the most storied and historic front rows in Indy history.

=== Second Day - Sunday May 12 ===
Many of the drivers who were left out of qualifying a day earlier returned to qualify on Sunday May 12. The first 45 minutes of the day saw heavy action. Gary Bettenhausen took to the track and completed his run at 224.468 mph, faster than Mears' pole speed, making him the fastest qualifier in the field. Since he was a second-day qualifier, however, he was forced to line up behind the first-day qualifiers, in 13th position.

Arie Luyendyk's qualifying run of 223.881 mph made him the third fastest car in the field, but his second-day status lined him up 14th. Emerson Fittipaldi finally made the field, qualifying 15th at 223.065 mph. The three cars of the 5th row (Bettenhausen, Luyendyk, Fittipaldi) ended up qualifying faster than the three cars of the front row.

The rest of the day saw light action with only one major incident, an accident from Dominic Dobson in turn four which fractured his left leg, wiping out the Burns team 89 Lola, but the injury was not enough to sideline him. However, the crash forced Dominic into a backup 89 Lola that was purchased from Truesports (Truesports ran the car during the 1990 season to save money while developing their own chassis). At the end of the day, the field was filled to 22 cars.

== Practice - Week 2 ==
The second week of practice focused on the non-qualified drivers, and those still looking for rides. Rookie Willy T. Ribbs passed his drivers test on Monday, but suffered through multiple engine failures during the week. Ribbs managed a practice lap of 213.230 mph, but as practice came to a close, it appeared doubtful he might be able to qualify.

Among the drivers named to rides during the week were former winners Gordon Johncock and Tom Sneva. The Patrick Racing Alfa-Romeo team added Roberto Guerrero (their primary driver from 1990) for a second team car. Al Unser Sr., however, was unable to secure a competitive ride, and decided to sit out the race. Initially Unser was expected to drive a back-up car to Arie Luyendyk at UNO/Granatelli Racing, but engine lease issues, and the lack of adequate preparation time prevented the deal from coming to fruition. Unser missed the race for the first time since 1969, the year he broke his leg in a motorcycle crash in the infield the night before time trials.

Rookie Hiro Matsushita led the speed chart for the non-qualified drivers most of the week, with a top lap of 216.570 mph. Roberto Guerrero quickly got up to speed in the Alfa Romeo, with the fastest lap of the week (216.941 mph).

Two days during the second week of practice, Tuesday (May 14) and Thursday (May 16), saw limited track activity due to rain. After concerns earlier in the month about a short field, going into the final weekend of time trials, enough rides had materialized to ensure a full 33-car field.

== Time Trials - Second weekend ==
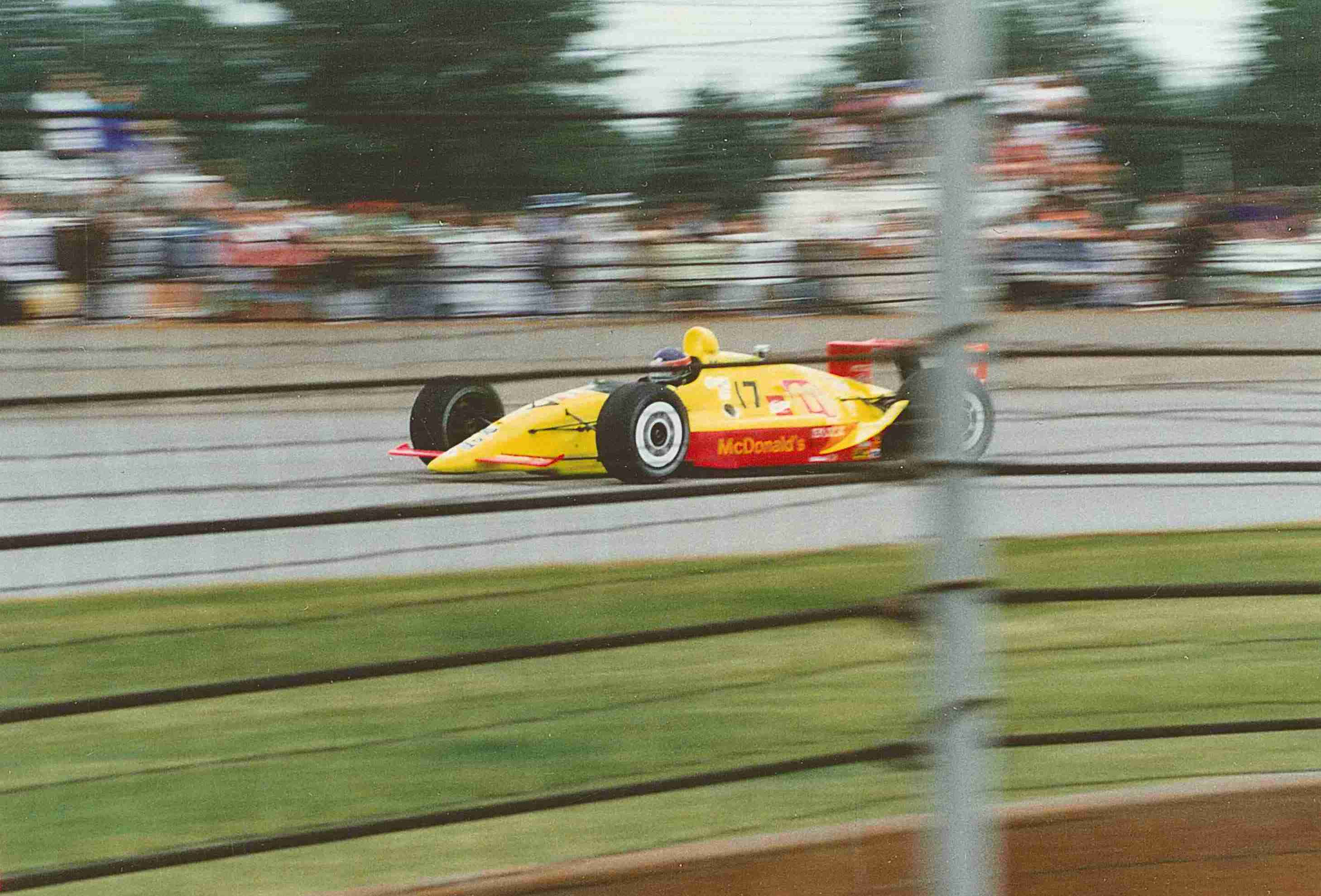
Willy T. Ribbs at the 1991 Indianapolis 500

=== Third Day - Saturday May 18 ===
Twelve cars made attempts in the first hour, and the field was filled to 29 cars. Rookie Hiro Matsushita was the fastest car of the day, qualifying at 218.141 mph, officially becoming the first Japanese driver to qualify for the Indy 500. Other notable qualifiers included Roberto Guerrero, John Paul Jr., and Scott Pruett. Tom Sneva completed a slow run of 213.189 mph, and he sat as the slowest car in the field.

Two crashes occurred during the day. Dean Hall crashed in the morning practice session, and Ted Prappas wrecked in turn 4 later in the afternoon. Both drivers would miss the race.

Willy T. Ribbs' frustrations continued, as his car revved too high, and he broke a valve on his warmup lap.

=== Bump Day - Sunday May 19 ===
Four positions remained open on the final day of time trials. Gordon Johncock was the first driver to complete an attempt, and took a run of 213.812 mph. A few minutes later, Willy T. Ribbs' car started smoking and spewing oil, and suffered a turbocharger failure. Yet another engine-related headache for the team. The team scrambled to replace the turbo, but then discovered a damaged scavenger pump, which delayed them further.

At 2:45 p.m., Pancho Carter filled the field to 33 cars. Tom Sneva (213.189 mph) was now on the bubble.

At about 3:30 p.m., Willy T. Ribbs finally returned to the track to shake down the car. He ran a few practice laps, and was quickly over 214 mph. At 5:05 p.m., the team placed the car in the tech line, and prepared to qualify. With much anticipation from fans and the media, Ribbs completed the four-lap qualifying run at a speed of 217.358 mph, the fastest laps he had run all month. On his cool-down lap, an ecstatic Ribbs hoisted himself partially out of his seat, waving and cheering with both hands out of the cockpit as he pulled into the pits. Ribbs bumped former winner Tom Sneva, and was comfortably in the field.

Randy Lewis was the final car to complete an attempt, and he bumped Johnny Parsons from the field. In the final 15 minutes, three drivers took to the track, but all three waved off. Gordon Johncock survived the bubble, and held on to qualify 33rd.

== Carburetion Day ==
The final practice was held Thursday May 23. Rain delayed the start of the two-hour practice session from 11 a.m. to 12:24 p.m. Officials announced that the field would be guaranteed at least 30 minutes of green flag track time. The session was ended after only 51 minutes, to the surprise of some participants. A total of 32 of the 33 qualified cars took laps, with only Pancho Carter (turbo problems) not getting out on the track. Rookies Buddy Lazier and Willy T. Ribbs both managed only a handful of shake down laps and no laps at speed. Kevin Cogan (223.892 mph) was the fastest of the day. No incidents were reported, but Cogan required a tow-in due to a minor electrical problem.

=== Pit Stop Contest ===
The semifinals and finals for the 15th annual Miller Genuine Draft Pit Stop Contest were held on Thursday May 23. The top three race qualifiers and their respective pit crews were automatically eligible: Rick Mears, A. J. Foyt, and Mario Andretti. However, Mears declined the invitation. Bobby Rahal (who qualified 4th) took that empty spot. A total of 13 other teams entered to compete for the fourth and final spot.

On Wednesday May 15, the first round of pit stop contest preliminaries were held. Participants were required to perform a two-tire pit stop with a simulated fuel coupling. The results were: Eddie Cheever (13.586 seconds) and Arie Luyendyk (13.699 seconds). On Thursday May 16, the second round of preliminaries were held. Danny Sullivan (11.298 seconds) set the fastest time and secured the fourth and final semifinal spot. The rest of the times were as follows: Al Unser Jr. (11.762 seconds), Michael Andretti (12.842 seconds), Emerson Fittipaldi (13.060 seconds), John Andretti (13.538 seconds), Scott Brayton (22.033 seconds), and Gary Bettenhausen (25.511 seconds). Entrants Hiro Matsushita, Tony Bettenhausen, Scott Pruett, and Mike Groff did not participate.

In the first semifinal, Danny Sullivan defeated A. J. Foyt. Sullivan was issued a 5-second penalty for a crew member over the wall too soon, but Foyt's crew had difficulty with the lug nut on the right-front wheel. In the second semifinal, Bobby Rahal beat Mario Andretti. The two teams were neck-and-neck, but when they dropped the jacks, Andretti's car stalled and failed to leave the pit box. That set up a final between Sullivan (Patrick Racing) and Rahal (Galles-KRACO Racing). Sullivan, led by chief mechanic Mike Hull, won by two-tenths of a second, his fourth win in the event individually, and first win for Patrick Racing. Rahal, led by Jim Prescott, finished runner-up in the event for the fourth time in his career, and for the second year in a row with Galles-KRACO.

Semifinals
18	Bobby Rahal (Galles-KRACO Racing)	13.301
6	Mario Andretti (Newman/Haas Racing)	No time
20	Danny Sullivan (Patrick Racing)	20.862
3	A. J. Foyt (A. J. Foyt Enterprises)	25.556

Finals
20	Danny Sullivan (Patrick Racing)	13.114
18	Bobby Rahal (Galles-KRACO Racing)	13.382

== Starting grid ==
Row	Inside		Middle		Outside	
1	3	(United States) Rick Mears W 224.113 mph (360.675 km/h)	14	(United States) A. J. Foyt W 222.443 mph (357.987 km/h)	6	(United States) Mario Andretti W 221.818 mph (356.981 km/h)
2	18	(United States) Bobby Rahal W 221.401 mph (356.310 km/h)	10	(United States) Michael Andretti; 220.943 mph (355.573 km/h)	2	(United States) Al Unser Jr. 219.823 mph (353.771 km/h)
3	4	(United States) John Andretti; 219.059 mph (352.541 km/h)	26	(United Kingdom) Jim Crawford; 218.947 mph (352.361 km/h)	20	(United States) Danny Sullivan W 218.343 mph (351.389 km/h)
4	8	(United States) Eddie Cheever; 218.122 mph (351.033 km/h)	86	(United States) Jeff Andretti R 217.632 mph (350.245 km/h)	15	(Canada) Scott Goodyear; 216.751 mph (348.827 km/h)
5	51	(United States) Gary Bettenhausen; 224.468 mph (361.246 km/h)	1	(Netherlands) Arie Luyendyk W 223.881 mph (360.302 km/h)	5	(Brazil) Emerson Fittipaldi W 223.064 mph (358.987 km/h)
6	9	(United States) Kevin Cogan; 222.844 mph (358.633 km/h)	91	(United States) Stan Fox; 219.501 mph (353.253 km/h)	50	(United States) Mike Groff R 219.015 mph (352.470 km/h)
7	22	(United States) Scott Brayton; 218.627 mph (351.846 km/h)	16	(United States) Tony Bettenhausen Jr. 218.188 mph (351.140 km/h)	48	(Mexico) Bernard Jourdain; 216.683 mph (348.717 km/h)
8	21	(Australia) Geoff Brabham; 214.859 mph (345.782 km/h)	71	(United States) Buddy Lazier R 218.692 mph (351.951 km/h)	7	(Japan) Hiro Matsushita R 218.141 mph (351.064 km/h)
9	93	(United States) John Paul Jr. 217.952 mph (350.760 km/h)	23	(Finland) Tero Palmroth; 215.648 mph (347.052 km/h)	19	(United States) Scott Pruett; 214.814 mph (345.710 km/h)
10	40	(Colombia) Roberto Guerrero; 214.027 mph (344.443 km/h)	17	(United States) Willy T. Ribbs R 217.358 mph (349.804 km/h)	66	(United States) Dominic Dobson; 215.326 mph (346.534 km/h)
11	39	(United States) Randy Lewis; 214.565 mph (345.309 km/h)	12	(United States) Pancho Carter; 214.012 mph (344.419 km/h)	92	(United States) Gordon Johncock W 213.812 mph (344.097 km/h)

Gary Bettenhausen was the fastest qualifier. However, he qualified on the second day of time trials, and thus, was ineligible for the pole position. He lined up as the fastest second day qualifier, behind the 12 drivers who qualified on the first day.

=== Alternates ===
- First alternate: Johnny Parsons (#11) - Bumped; standing by as relief driver for Gordon Johncock, who was ill on race day
- Second alternate: Tom Sneva W (#59) - Bumped

=== Failed to Qualify ===
- Salt Walther (#77) - Too slow
- Didier Theys (#17/#50T) - Too slow
- Mark Dismore (#12) - wrecked in practice on May 10, serious leg, neck, and foot injuries
- Dean Hall (#97) - Wrecked in practice on May 18, knee injury
- Ted Prappas (#31) - wrecked in practice on May 18
- Guido Daccò R (#37) - Completed only 6 practice laps, did not attempt to qualify
- Davey Hamilton (#81) - Did not practice
- Phil Krueger (#25) - Did not practice
- Vinicio Salmi R (#36) - Did not practice
- Paul Tracy (#90) - Replaced by Randy Lewis
- Jeff Wood R

R = Indianapolis 500 rookie	W = Former Indianapolis 500 winner

== Race recap ==
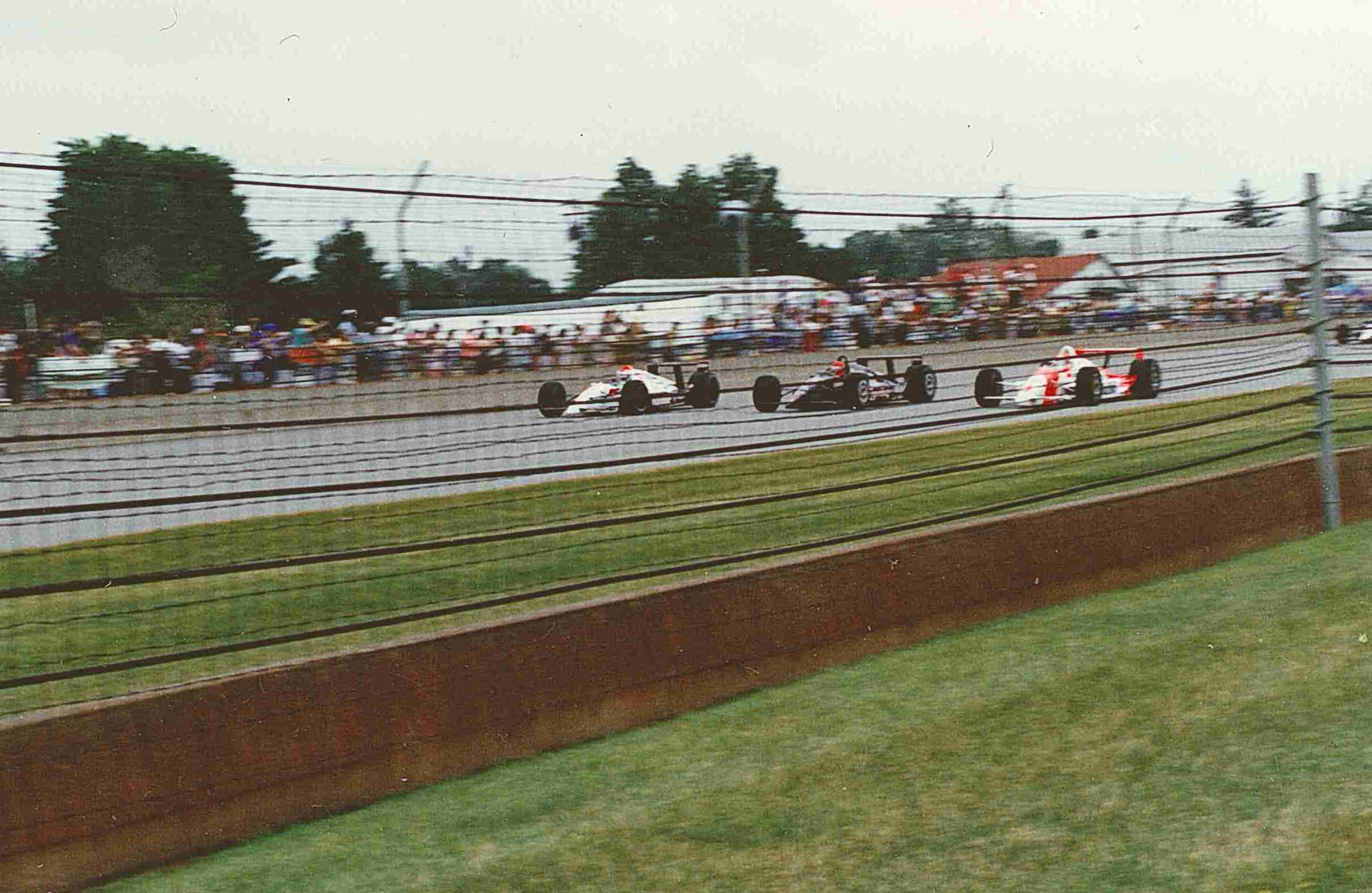
Front row during the pace laps. Outside (Mario Andretti), middle (A. J. Foyt), inside (Rick Mears)

=== Start ===
Morning rain delayed the start of the race by 55 minutes. Mary F. Hulman gave the command to start engines at 11:46 a.m., and the field pulled away. Danny Sullivan's Alfa Romeo car suffered a fuel pump problem, and was he pushed back to the pits. Observers also noted that the engine in the car of Willy T. Ribbs did not sound right. The field circulated for three warm-up laps (two parade laps and one pace lap).

At the start, polesitter Rick Mears took the lead into turn one. Gary Bettenhausen got sideways in turn 1, causing Buddy Lazier to swerve and tag the outside wall with his nosecone. The caution came out, and both Bettenhausen and Lazier made it back to the pits. Bettenhausen changed tires and continued, but Lazier's car was too damaged to continue.

After quick repairs, Danny Sullivan joined the race right after the field took the green flag. However, since he missed the three warm-up laps, he was given a three-lap penalty, and was not scored until his fourth time around (so as to match the other cars). On lap 5, Willy T. Ribbs pulled into the pits with a misfire, and dropped out.

=== First half ===
Mears gave up the lead to Mario Andretti on lap 12. Michael Andretti then took the lead and dominated most of the first half.

On lap 25, Kevin Cogan and Roberto Guerrero clipped wheels in turn one, and the two cars crashed hard into the outside wall. Guerrero was unhurt, but Cogan suffered injuries to his right shoulder and forearm. Debris from the crash littered the track, and A. J. Foyt ran over a large piece of debris, breaking his left front suspension. Foyt limped back to the pits, waving to the crowd, as he felt his day was done. The crowd gave him an ovation as he walked back to the garage area, but he was still non-committal to his retirement decision.

Cogan assigned Guerrero the responsibility for the crash in interviews that evening, and maintained that stance even later in life. Footage from the broadcast was inconclusive of what caused the Cogan-Guerrero crash. At some point later, however, amateur footage shot from a spectator in the grandstand emerged that showed that Cogan may have come down on Guerrero. Blame for the crash has never been fully vetted.

Several cars began dropping out due to mechanical problems. Jim Crawford, John Paul Jr., Mike Groff, Tero Palmroth, and Gary Bettenhausen were all out of the race before the halfway point.

At the halfway point, Michael Andretti continued to lead, with Emerson Fittipaldi holding onto second. Teammates Bobby Rahal and Al Unser Jr. were strong top five contenders. Rick Mears barely clung to the lead lap, and was in danger of being lapped at one point.

=== Second half ===
Michael Andretti continued his dominance, but Emerson Fittipaldi was now a strong challenger. Fittipaldi took the lead on lap 113, and held it for a total of 46 laps in the second half. Fittipaldi suffered a gearbox failure exiting the pits on lap 171, and dropped out of the race.

The field dwindled down to only about 13 cars for the final 50 laps. Early contender Bobby Rahal blew an engine on lap 130, followed by Scott Brayton, who also blew an engine on lap 149. Mario Andretti faded in the second half, falling two laps down and out of contention for the win. Only two cars remained on the lead lap - Michael Andretti and Rick Mears. Arie Luyendyk moved into third, one lap down, with Al Unser Jr. also in the top five. Unser's car though was suffering from wastegate problems.

Gordon Johncock, who started 33rd, and was suffering from flu-like symptoms before the race, was now in the top ten.

=== Finish ===
On lap 183, Danny Sullivan blew his engine down the frontstretch, spewing a huge cloud of smoke, and bringing out the caution flag. Leader Michael Andretti took advantage of the break, and ducked into the pits for much-needed fuel. Andretti's stop was quick, and he came back out onto the track in second. He lined up just behind leader Rick Mears for the restart.

As the leaders came down for the restart to complete lap 186, Andretti diced back and forth down the frontstretch, and passed Mears on the outside of turn one to take the lead in dramatic fashion. It was a rare move drivers would seldom attempt. Immediately after the pass Andretti began to pull away, but Mears reeled him back in after the exit of turn four. At the end of the main stretch, not to be upstaged, Mears pulled the same move, passing Andretti on the outside of turn one to re-take the lead. Almost immediately, Mears began pulling away from Andretti, as Andretti's handling began to go away.

With only 11 laps to go, Mears began to lengthen his lead. Suddenly on lap 190, Andretti's father Mario Andretti stalled at the entrance to the pits. The yellow flag came out for the tow-in and bunched the field for another restart. A controversy erupted, as many felt Mario stopped on purpose in a ploy to aid his son. Mario denied this post-race, saying that he only warned Michael that "Whether he needs a yellow or not, I'm creating one because I can't make it to the pits."

After the race, a fan who had been recording Mario's radio communication presented USAC with a tape of his crew ordering Mario to cause a caution. "Michael needs a yellow. Stop, Mario. Create a yellow!" After a pause in which Mario did not respond, the next communication then said, "We'll come on down and pick you up." USAC spokesman Bill Marvel said the organization would take no action on the matter, saying, "We are doing nothing about the tape. There is no acknowledgement from Mario on it indicating that he did anything wrong, and the bottom line is that the stopping by Mario did not change the outcome of the race."

The green flag came out with six laps to go, and Mears got the jump on the restart. Michael Andretti's handling was not improving, and he was unable to challenge Mears for the lead. Mears cruised over the final five laps to the finish line, and became the third four-time winner of the Indianapolis 500.

In a 2011 interview, Michael Andretti and Roger Penske both stated that had Andretti managed to put Mears a lap down, it likely would have been over for Mears. What changed the complexity of the race was that Andretti suffered a cut tire just before he could have lapped Mears.

== Box score ==
Finish	Start	No	Driver	Team	Chassis	Engine	Laps	Status	Points
1	1	3	(United States) Rick Mears W	Team Penske	Penske PC-20	Ilmor-Chevrolet	200	176.457 mph	21
2	5	10	(United States) Michael Andretti	Newman/Haas Racing	Lola T91/00	Ilmor-Chevrolet	200	+3.149 seconds	17
3	14	1	(Netherlands) Arie Luyendyk W	Granatelli Race Team	Lola T91/00	Ilmor-Chevrolet	199	-1 Lap	14
4	6	2	(United States) Al Unser Jr.	Galles-KRACO Racing	Lola T91/00	Ilmor-Chevrolet	198	-2 Laps	12
5	7	4	(United States) John Andretti	Hall-VDS Racing	Lola T91/00	Ilmor-Chevrolet	197	-3 Laps	10
6	33	92	(United States) Gordon Johncock W	Hemelgarn-Byrd Racing	Lola T90/00	Cosworth DFS	188	-12 Laps	8
7	3	6	(United States) Mario Andretti W	Newman/Haas Racing	Lola T91/00	Ilmor-Chevrolet	187	Engine	6
8	17	91	(United States) Stan Fox	Hemelgarn-Byrd Racing	Lola T91/00	Buick V-6	185	-15 Laps	5
9	20	16	(United States) Tony Bettenhausen Jr.	Bettenhausen Racing	Penske PC-19	Ilmor-Chevrolet	180	-20 Laps	4
10	9	20	(United States) Danny Sullivan W	Patrick Racing	Lola T91/00	Alfa Romeo	173	Turbo	3
11	15	5	(Brazil) Emerson Fittipaldi W	Team Penske	Penske PC-20	Ilmor-Chevrolet	171	Gearbox	2
12	27	19	(United States) Scott Pruett	Truesports	Truesports 91	Judd AV	166	Transmission	1
13	30	66	(United States) Dominic Dobson	Burns Racing	Lola T89/00	Judd AV	164	-36 Laps	
14	31	39	(United States) Randy Lewis	Dale Coyne Racing	Lola T90/00	Cosworth DFS	159	-41 Laps	
15	11	86	(United States) Jeff Andretti R	Bruce Leven	Lola T91/00	Cosworth DFS	150	Engine	
16	24	7	(Japan) Hiro Matsushita R	Paragon-Dick Simon Racing	Lola T91/00	Buick V-6	149	-51 Laps	
17	19	22	(United States) Scott Brayton	Dick Simon Racing	Lola T91/00	Ilmor-Chevrolet	146	Engine	
18	21	48	(Mexico) Bernard Jourdain	A. J. Foyt Enterprises	Lola T91/00	Buick V-6	141	Gearbox	
19	4	18	(United States) Bobby Rahal W	Galles-KRACO Racing	Lola T91/00	Ilmor-Chevrolet	130	Engine	
20	22	21	(Australia) Geoff Brabham	Truesports	Truesports 91	Judd AV	109	Electrical	
21	32	12	(United States) Pancho Carter	Arciero Racing	Lola T89/00	Buick V-6	94	Engine	
22	13	51	(United States) Gary Bettenhausen	Team Menard	Lola T91/00	Buick V-6	89	Radiator	1
23	26	23	(Finland) Tero Palmroth	Paragon-Dick Simon Racing	Lola T90/00	Cosworth DFS	77	Engine	
24	18	50	(United States) Mike Groff R	Euromotorsports	Lola T91/00	Cosworth DFS	68	Water leak	
25	25	93	(United States) John Paul Jr.	D.B. Mann Development	Lola T90/00	Buick V-6	53	Oil leak	
26	8	26	(United Kingdom) Jim Crawford	King Racing	Lola T91/00	Buick V-6	49	Engine	
27	12	15	(Canada) Scott Goodyear	O'Donnell Racing	Lola T91/00	Judd AV	38	Engine	
28	2	14	(United States) A. J. Foyt W	A. J. Foyt Enterprises	Lola T91/00	Ilmor-Chevrolet	25	Suspension	
29	16	9	(United States) Kevin Cogan	Team Menard	Lola T91/00	Buick V-6	24	Crash turn 1	
30	28	40	(Colombia) Roberto Guerrero	Patrick Racing	Lola T91/00	Alfa Romeo	23	Crash turn 1	
31	10	8	(United States) Eddie Cheever	Chip Ganassi Racing	Lola T91/00	Ilmor-Chevrolet	17	Electrical	
32	29	17	(United States) Willy T. Ribbs R	Walker Racing	Lola T90/00	Buick V-6	5	Engine	
33	23	71	(United States) Buddy Lazier R	Hemelgarn-Byrd Racing	Lola T90/00	Buick V-6	1	Crash turn 1	

R = Indianapolis 500 rookie
W = Former Indianapolis 500 winner

All cars utilized Goodyear tires.

=== Race statistics ===
Lap Leaders
Laps	Leader
1–11	Rick Mears
12–33	Mario Andretti
34–54	Michael Andretti
55	Al Unser Jr.
56–79	Michael Andretti
80–82	Al Unser Jr.
83–108	Michael Andretti
109–112	Emerson Fittipaldi
113	Bobby Rahal
114–138	Emerson Fittipaldi
139–140	Rick Mears
141–153	Emerson Fittipaldi
154–165	Michael Andretti
166–169	Emerson Fittipaldi
170	Rick Mears
171–183	Michael Andretti
184–186	Rick Mears
187	Michael Andretti
188–200	Rick Mears

Total laps led
Driver	Laps
Michael Andretti	97
Emerson Fittipaldi	46
Rick Mears	30
Mario Andretti	22
Al Unser Jr.	4
Bobby Rahal	1

Cautions: 7 for 35 laps
Laps	Reason
1–3	Gary Bettenhausen, Buddy Lazier crash in turn 1
20–23	Eddie Cheever stalled in turn 4
25–33	Roberto Guerrero, Kevin Cogan, A. J. Foyt crash in turn 1
84–89	Tero Palmroth blown engine
148–153	Scott Brayton blown engine; Bernard Jourdain stalled on track
184–186	Danny Sullivan blown turbocharger on mainstretch
191–194	Mario Andretti stalled at pit entrance

=== Race notes ===
- The 1991 Indy 500 was held shortly after the conclusion on Operation Desert Storm. General Norman Schwarzkopf was invited to serve as grand marshal.
- Michael Andretti's second-place finish would be the best Indy 500 result in his career. Michael Andretti led the most laps, and led as late as 13 laps to go, but failed to win, adding to the Andretti Curse.
- The race's 75th Running was highly publicized, and the event was advertised as the "Diamond Jubilee Running."
- Three days after the 1991 race, Stephen C. White, 31, of Indianapolis, entered the grounds of the speedway early on Wednesday, May 29. At some point before 7:30 a.m., he started driving around the track in a GMC pickup truck. He completed three or four laps, approaching speeds of 100 mph (160 km/h). Luther Wray, a foreman in the speedway's maintenance department attempted to block his truck by parking a Dodge Caravan minivan on the track near the start-finish line. White was driving approximately 90 mph (140 km/h) when he struck the van, his truck became airborne and landed approximately 150 feet (46 m) away. He was pronounced dead upon arrival at Methodist Hospital.
- With the win in the 1991 Indy 500, Rick Mears joined Bobby Unser in becoming only the second driver to win the Indianapolis 500 in 3 different decades.

== Broadcasting ==
=== Radio ===
The race was carried live on the IMS Radio Network. Bob Jenkins served as chief announcer for the second year. Johnny Rutherford returned as "driver expert" and Bob Forbes conducted the winner's interview in victory lane. The network celebrated its 40th anniversary.

For 1991, the backstretch reporting location was eliminated permanently. Howdy Bell, who revived the position from 1989 to 1990, moved into the booth to serve as "Statistician." Bell updated the running order for the entire field in 25-lap intervals. With Ron Carrell's departure, Chris McClure joined the crew as a new pit reporter.

Due to the rain delay, the broadcast signed on at 10:00 EST, but only for a weather report. The airtime was sent back to the affiliates to wait out the delay. Updates were given through the hour, and the network came back on-air for an abbreviated pre-race show. The race itself, however, was carried in its entirety.

Technical director Tom Allebrandi celebrated his 25th year working the broadcast. Longtime network veteran Ralph "Luke" Walton, who served on the crew for the final time in 1988, died on June 18, 1990, at the age of 83.

Indianapolis Motor Speedway Radio Network
Booth Announcers	Turn Reporters	Pit/garage reporters
Chief Announcer: Bob Jenkins; Driver expert: Johnny Rutherford; Statistician: Howdy Bell; Historian: Donald Davidson	Turn 1: Jerry Baker; Turn 2: Gary Lee; Turn 3: Larry Henry; Turn 4: Bob Lamey	Bob Forbes (north pits); Brian Hammons (north-center pits); Sally Larvick (south-center pits); Chris McClure (south pits); Chuck Marlowe (garages)

=== Television ===
The race was carried live flag-to-flag coverage in the United States on ABC Sports. Paul Page served as host and play-by-play announcer, accompanied by Bobby Unser and Sam Posey. The start of the race was delayed about one hour, and ABC filled the time with interviews, highlights, and other features.

The same exact crew from 1990 returned. To commemorate the 75th anniversary race, Jack Whitaker joined the pre-race coverage as an essayist.

Rick Mears was the first Indy 500 winner to carry an onboard camera for the television broadcast. The top four finishers happened to all be carrying on-board cameras, as well as the pace car. Bobby Rahal also carried a camera, but he dropped out early in the second half.

ABC Television
Booth Announcers	Pit/garage reporters
Host/Announcer: Paul Page; Color: Sam Posey; Color: Bobby Unser; Essayist: Jack Whitaker	Jack Arute; Gary Gerould; Dr. Jerry Punch

== CART championship standings after the race ==
Drivers' Championship standings
Rank	+/–	Driver	Points	Difference
1	1	(United States) Rick Mears	58	Leader
2	1	(Netherlands) Arie Luyendyk	49	-9
3	2	(United States) Bobby Rahal	48	-10
4		(United States) Al Unser Jr.	42	-16
5		(United States) John Andretti	32	26

- Note: Only the top five positions are included for the drivers' standings.

== 1990–91 USAC Gold Crown Championship ==
1990–91 USAC Championship Car season
- USAC Gold Crown Championship

Season
- Races: 1

Awards
- National champion: (United States) Rick Mears

The 1990–91 USAC Gold Crown Championship season consisted of one sanctioned race. The schedule was based on a split-calendar, beginning in June 1990 and running through May 1991. Starting in 1981, USAC scaled back their participation in top-level Indy car racing, and ultimately ceased sanctioning races outside of the Indianapolis 500 following their 1983–84 season. Subsequently, the Gold Crown Championship would consist of only one event annually; the winner of the Indianapolis 500 would be the de facto Gold Crown champion, as it was their lone points-paying event. The preeminent national championship season was instead sanctioned by CART, and the Indy 500 paid championship points separately (on a different scale) toward the CART championship as well.

Rick Mears, by virtue of winning the 1991 Indianapolis 500, also won the 1990–91 USAC Championship.

=== Final points standings (Top five) ===
Pos	Driver	INDY (United States)	Pts
1	(United States) Rick Mears	1	1000
2	(United States) Michael Andretti	2	800
3	(Netherlands) Arie Luyendyk	3	700
4	(United States) Al Unser Jr.	4	600
5	(United States) John Andretti	5	500

== Selected rules and specifications ==
In 1991, in an effort to attract smaller, independent engine builders, USAC amended the specifications for V-8 pushrod engines. The engines were allowed a displacement of 209 in^{3} (3.42 L), but no longer were required to be production-based or include factory production-based parts. In addition, they were permitted 55 inHg (1,900 mbar) of turbocharger boost, the same increased level that the "stock block" V-6 were allowed. Though no teams utilized that engine formula in 1991, it would later see attempted use by the Greenfield team, and more famously (and successfully) by Team Penske in 1994.

Engine regulations
Engine Type	Maximum Displacement	Turbocharger Boost
Turbocharged DOHC V-8	161.7 in^{3} (2.65 L)	45 inHg (1,500 mbar)
Turbocharged Stock Block V-6	209.3 in^{3} (3.43 L)	55 inHg (1,900 mbar)
Turbocharged pushrod V-8	209.3 in^{3} (3.43 L)	55 inHg (1,900 mbar)
Normally aspriated OHC	274.6 in^{3} (4.50 L)	—
Normally aspriated Stock Block	390.0 in^{3} (6.39 L)	—
Fuel	On-board capacity	Total allotment
Methanol	40 US gal (151.4 L)	280 US gal (1,100 L)

Rookie Test
Phase	Laps	Speed bracket
1	10	185–190 mph
2	10	190–195 mph
3*	10	195–200 mph
4*	10	over 200 mph

*Veteran Refresher tests consisted of Phases 3–4 of the rookie test.

- https://www.trackforum.org/forum/motorsports/eagle104-s-nostalgia/6867902-indianapolis-500-rookie-tests-rop
- https://web.archive.org/web/20120329085941/http://johnsonindy500.trackforum.com/indy500/indyspecs.html

== Gallery ==
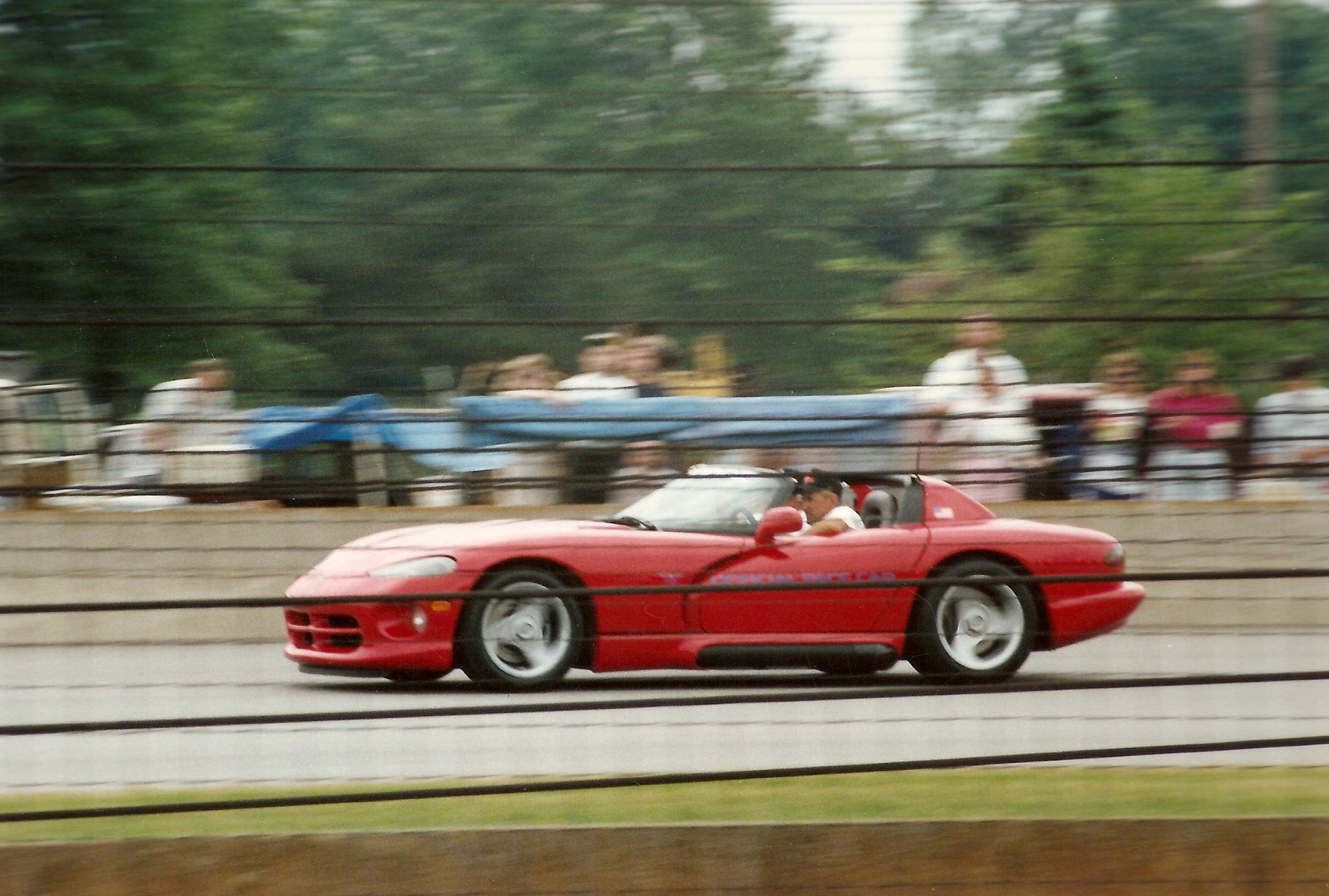
1991 Dodge Viper RT/10 pace car

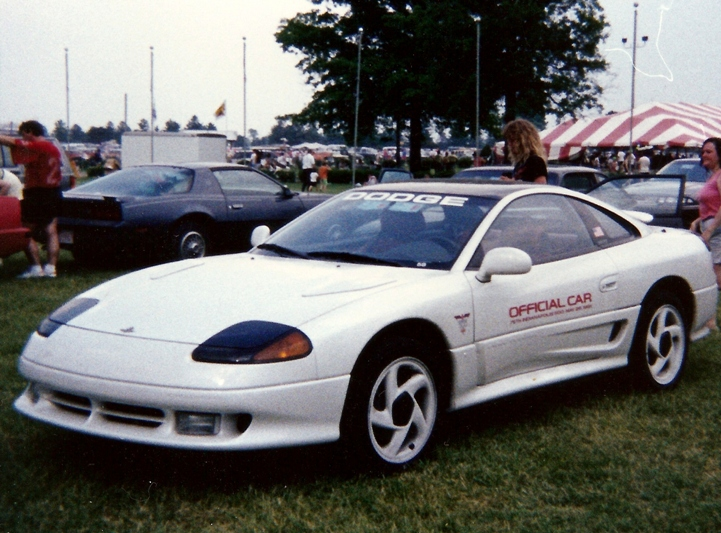
1991 Dodge Stealth Official Car

== Notes ==
=== Works cited ===
- 1991 Indianapolis 500 Day-By-Day Trackside Report For the Media
- Indianapolis 500 History: Race & All-Time Stats - Official Site
- 1991 Indianapolis 500 Radio Broadcast, Indianapolis Motor Speedway Radio Network

== Bibliography ==
- Hunt, Kurt D., ed. (1991). Indy Review, Volume 1: 75th Indianapolis 500. Osceola, WI: Indy 500 Publications / Indianapolis Motor Speedway Corporation. ISBN 978-1-880526-00-2.

1990 Indianapolis 500; Arie Luyendyk	1991 Indianapolis 500; Rick Mears	1992 Indianapolis 500; Al Unser Jr.
