= Rick Mears =

American racing driver (born 1951)

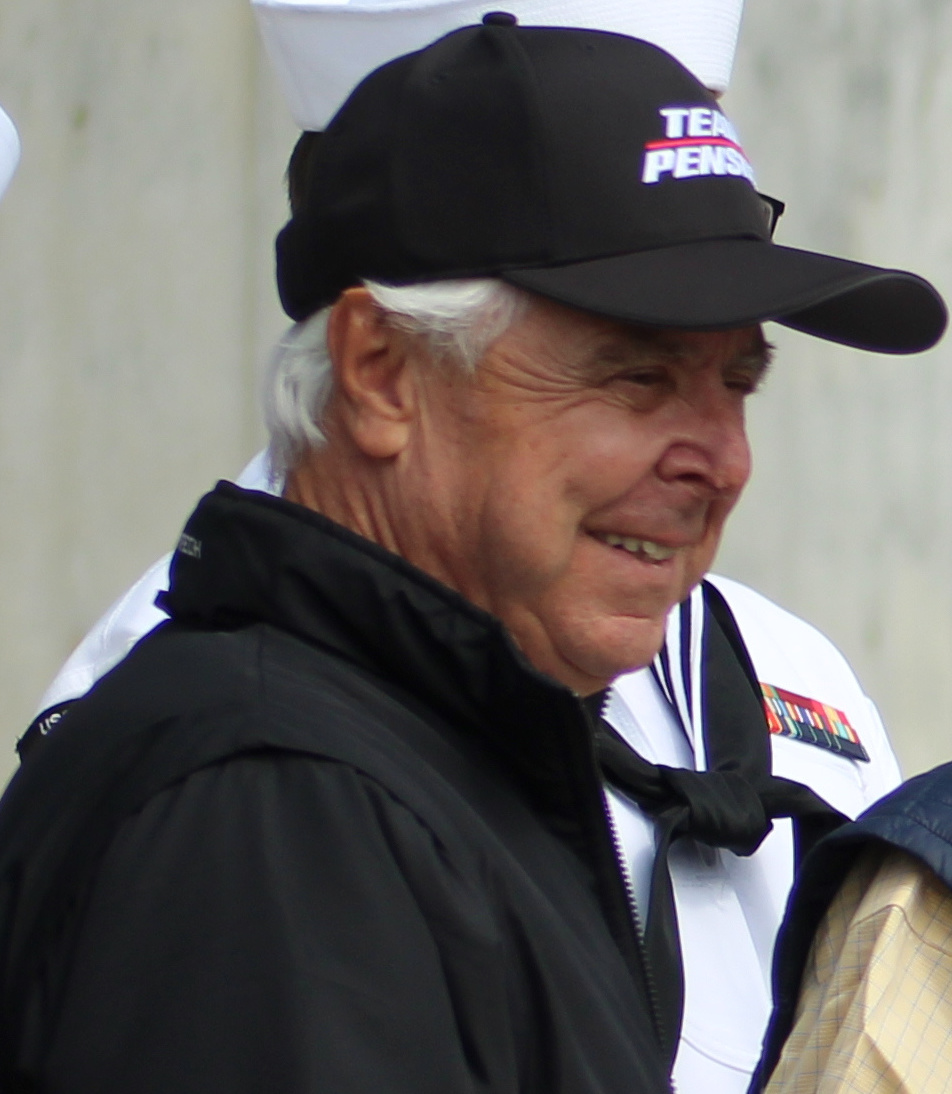
- Mears in 2021
- Born: Richard Ravon Mears; December 3, 1951 (age 74) Wichita, Kansas, U.S.

Championship titles
- CART Championship Car (1979, 1981, 1982); Major victories Pikes Peak Hill Climb (1976); Indianapolis 500 (1979, 1984, 1988, 1991); Pocono 500 (1982, 1985, 1987); Michigan 500 (1991)

Champ Car career
- 203 races run over 17 years
- Best finish: 1st (1979 (CART), 1981, 1982)
- First race: 1976 California 500 (Ontario)
- Last race: 1992 Michigan 500 (Michigan)
- First win: 1978 Rex Mays Classic (Milwaukee)
- Last win: 1991 Michigan 500 (Michigan)
Wins	Podiums	Poles
29	75	40

Richard Ravon Mears (born December 3, 1951) is an American former race car driver. He is one of four men to win the Indianapolis 500 four times (1979, 1984, 1988, 1991) and is the current record-holder for pole positions in the race with six (1979, 1982, 1986, 1988, 1989, 1991). Mears is also a three-time Indycar series/World Series champion (1979, 1981 and 1982).

== Biography ==
=== Early life ===
Mears was born in Wichita, Kansas and raised in Bakersfield, California. He began his racing career in off-road racing. In 1976, he was recommended by a representative of Bill Simpson's helmet company, and Simpson gave him a ride at the USAC Champ Car's California 500 in an old Eagle-Offenhauser, finishing eighth. Simpson then sold the car to Art Sugai, on the condition that Mears would continue driving it. In mid 1977, he switched to Theodore Racing.

Mears' speed attracted the attention of Roger Penske. Although at the time, Penske Racing had the services of Mario Andretti and Tom Sneva, Andretti was also racing with Lotus in Formula One; Penske wanted another young driver who would focus exclusively on American racing. In 1978, Mears was offered a part-time ride in nine of the 18 championship races, filling in when Andretti was overseas. The arrangement also included a ride at the 1978 Indianapolis 500.

In his rookie appearance at Indianapolis, Mears put his car on the front row and was the first rookie to qualify over 200 mph. When the race began, Mears discovered his helmet was not strapped on tight enough. Unfortunately, he had to make a pit stop where the helmet was safely secured. He did not lead a lap in the race and retired at 104 laps with a blown engine. Nonetheless, Mears ended up sharing "Rookie of the Year" honors with Larry Rice.

Two weeks later, at the Rex Mays Classic at Milwaukee, he won his first race. He added another win a month later at Atlanta and rounded out the year with his first road course win at Brands Hatch. Because of his terrific showing as a rookie, Mears was elevated to full-time status at Penske Racing for 1979 after teammate and series champion Tom Sneva parted company with Penske.

=== 1979 ===
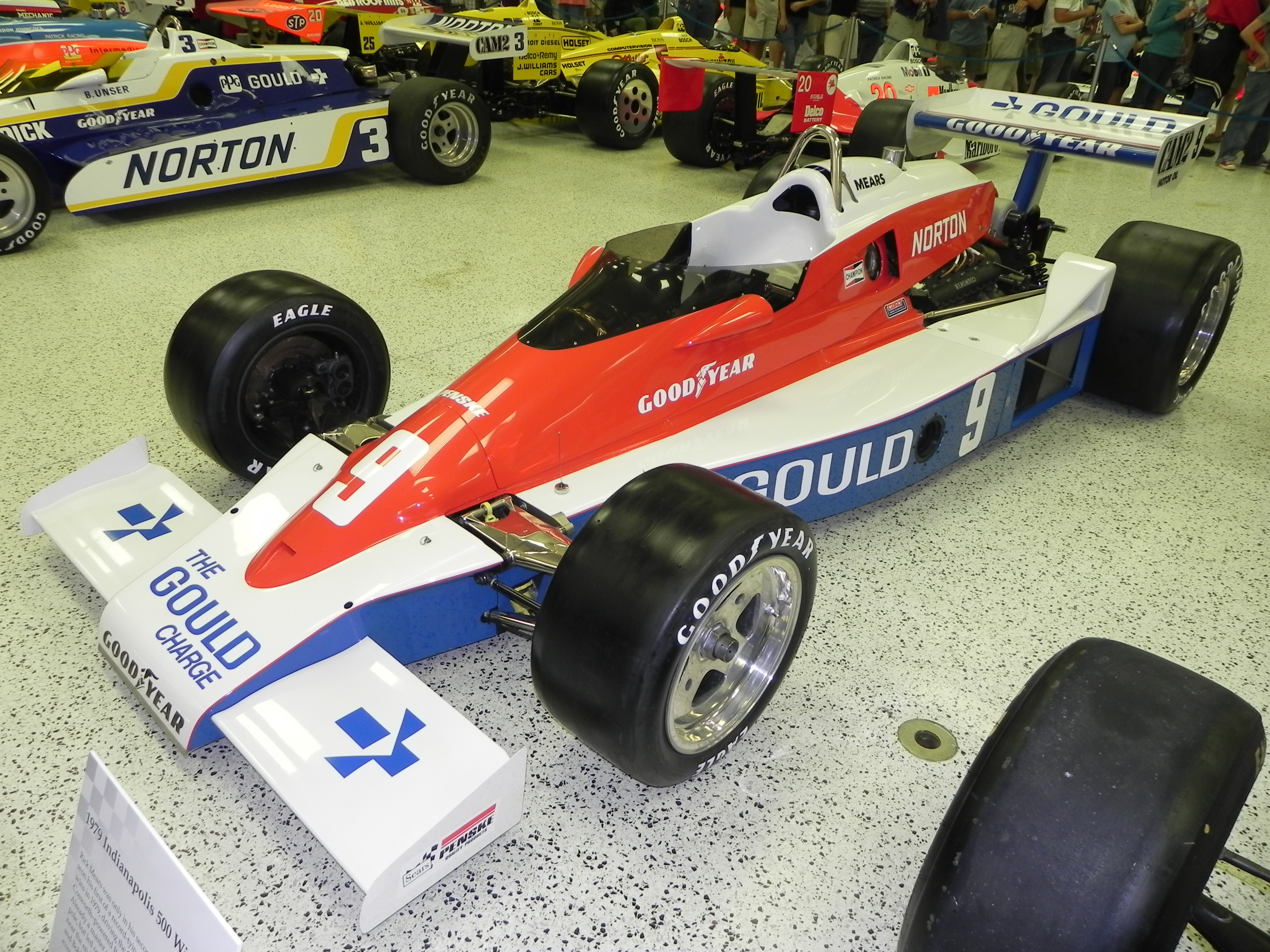
Mears' winning car from the 1979 Indianapolis 500

In 1979, the National Championship sanction was changed from the USAC to CART. At Indianapolis, Mears won his first "500", staying at the front of the field and taking full advantage when Bobby Unser fell out of contention with mechanical trouble. Three wins and four second places in the eleven CART-eligible races won Mears his first championship. His worst finish that season was seventh in Trenton's second heat.

=== 1980 ===
In 1980, the ground effect Chaparral was technologically more advanced than the other chassis, and Johnny Rutherford drove it to his third win at Indianapolis, going on to dominate the season. Mears finished fourth in the points with one win, earned at Mexico City.

In 1980, Mears was offered a Formula One test with Team Brabham by then team boss, Bernie Eccelstone. Mears interest in the test was largely because of the ongoing split between CART and USAC and he wanted to keep his options open should CART fall apart. Mears tested with Brabham twice, once at Paul Ricard and once at Riverside. After adjusting his driving style to the Brabham BT49, Mears posted lap times within half a second of future three time Formula One champion and then Brabham driver Nelson Piquet at the first test.

During the second test, Mears posted lap times faster than Piquet's. Piquet was so impressed with Mears' driving, as well as their time spent together, that he endorsed bringing Mears on as a second driver. Eccelstone offered Mears a contract with Brabham for 1981, but Mears declined. Mears would later say in his memoir that although he felt that Brabham was a strong team and that he had the skill to compete for wins in Formula One, he was unsure about moving to Europe and was still interested in oval racing.

=== 1981–1982 ===
The 1981 and 1982 seasons Mears went on to win two more championships. Despite facial burns during a pit fire in the 1981 Indianapolis 500, Mears' ten race victories in the two-year span were enough for two more Indycar championships. At the 1982 Indianapolis 500, he came within 0.16 of a second from securing his second Indianapolis 500 win. With less than 20 laps to go, on his final pit stop, the crew filled up the entire tank rather than giving him only the amount he needed to finish. The delay left him more than 11 seconds behind Gordon Johncock.

Mears' 1982 Penske PC-10

Nevertheless, Mears made up the difference when Johncock suffered handling problems; however, his valiant effort fell short as he was narrowly beaten out by Johncock. The photo finish stood for ten years as the closest finish at the Indianapolis 500. The photo-finish also quieted the controversy surrounding the pace-lap crash with teammate Kevin Cogan when he appeared to spin out of control for no apparent reason; fellow drivers Gordon Johncock, Johnny Rutherford, and Bobby Unser, said that Mears was to blame for the crash as he brought the field down too slowly at the start of the race.

=== 1983–1984 ===
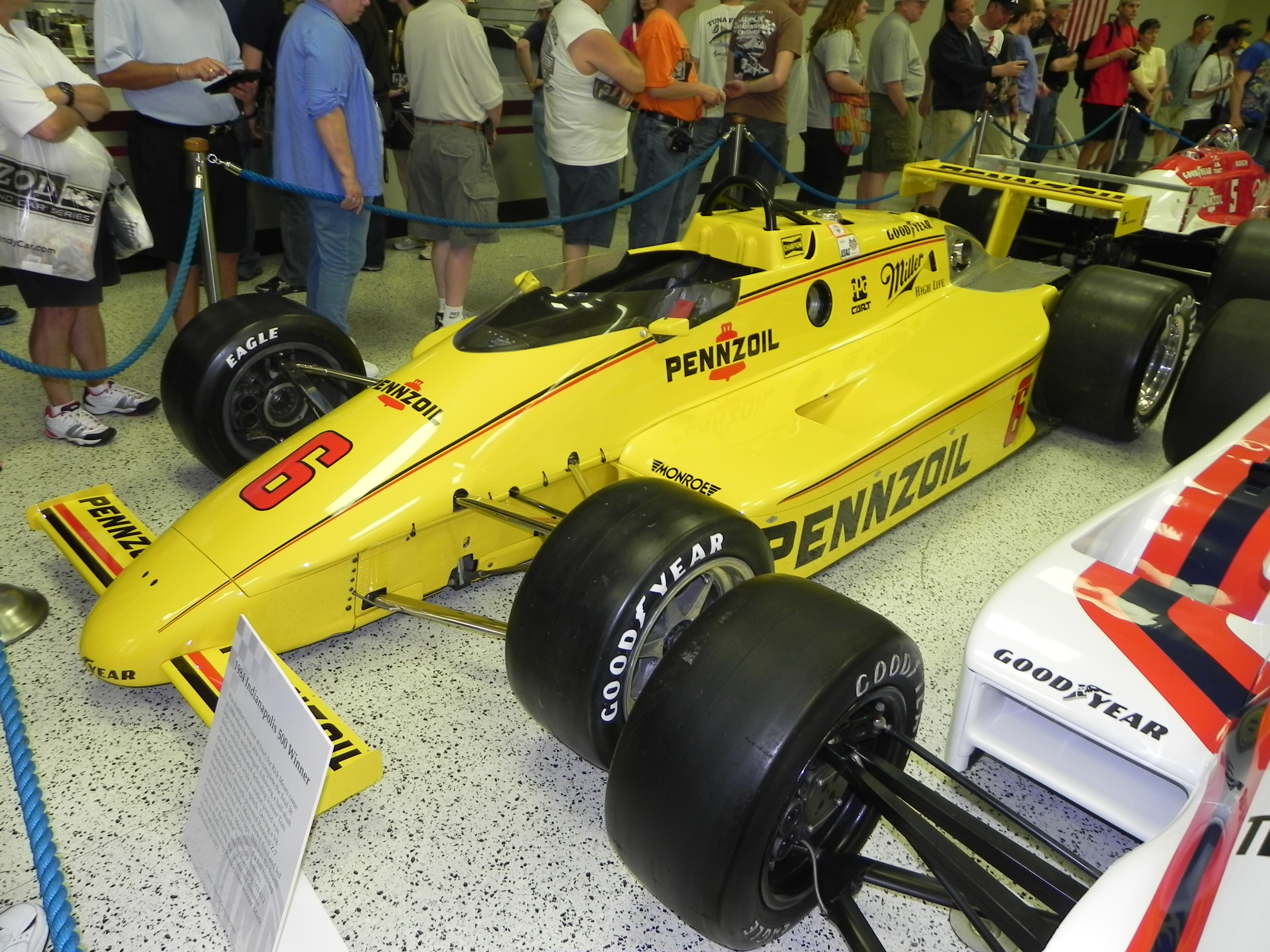
Mears' winning car from the 1984 Indianapolis 500

For 1983, Penske acquired the Pennzoil sponsorship with its yellow paint scheme. Teammate Al Unser took that year's title. The team switched to the March chassis for the 1984 Indianapolis 500 after the Penske chassis proved unsuccessful in the first two races of the year.

Mears scored his second Indianapolis 500 win that May, but suffered severe leg injuries later in the year in a crash at the Sanair Super Speedway. The March chassis, like most contemporary open-wheel racing cars, sat the driver far forward in the nose, with little protection for the legs and feet.

=== 1985–1987 ===
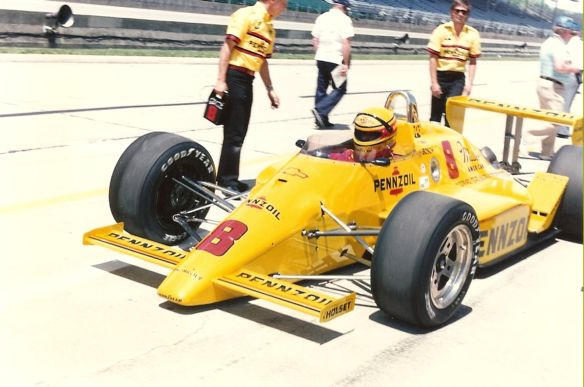
Mears in a Penske PC-16 chassis during practice for the 1987 Indianapolis 500

After the Sanair crash, Mears was slowed down by the injuries to his right foot and that affected him throughout the remainder of his career. Over the next three seasons, he won only two races. Notwithstanding his injuries, he did make a comeback by winning the 1985 Pocono 500. In 1986, he went on to win he pole position for the Indianapolis 500, but finished third in the race. He also went on to win the 1987 Pocono 500.

=== 1988–1990 ===
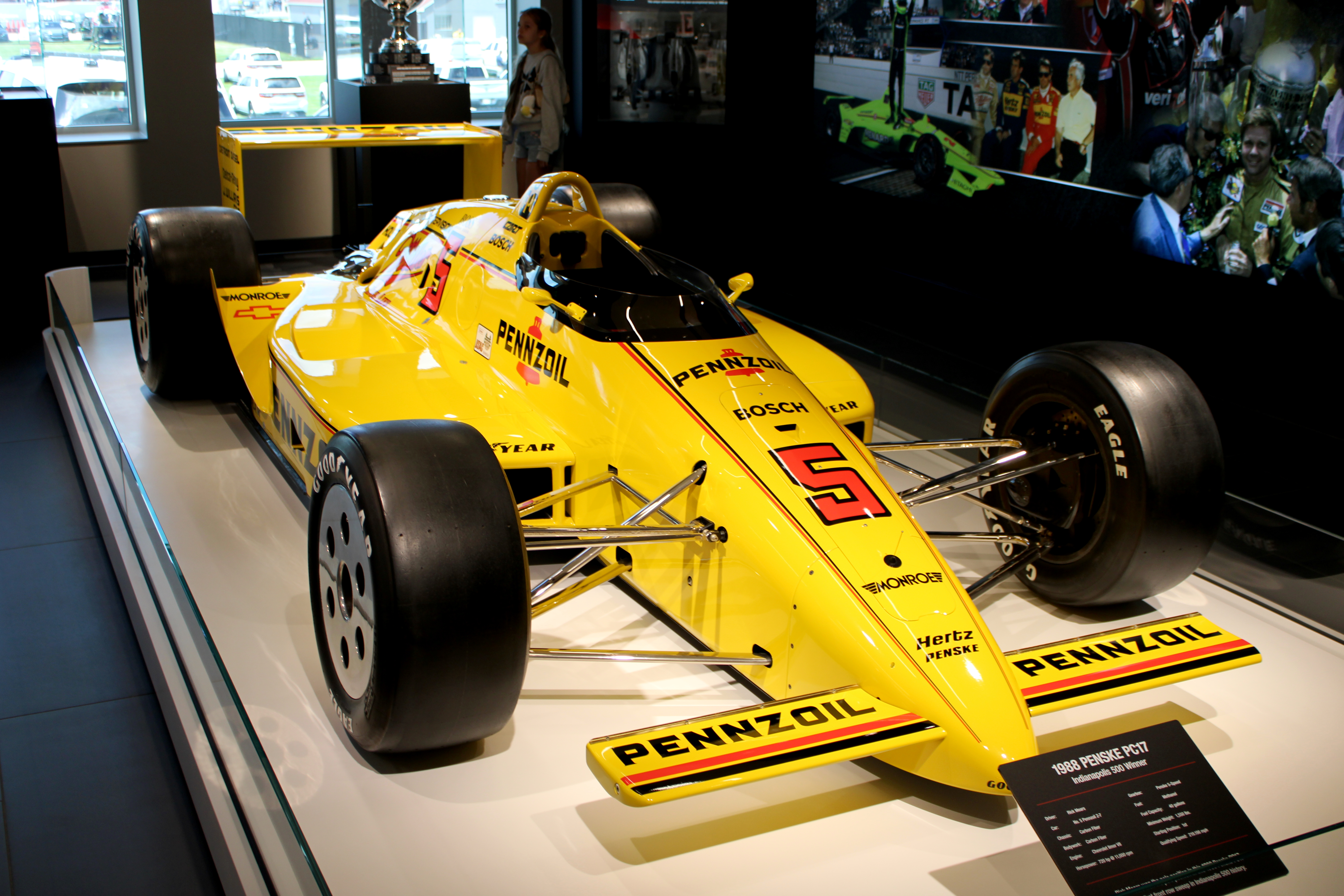
Mears' winning car from the 1988 Indianapolis 500

In 1988, after several years using the March chassis, the Penske team utilized a new car, the PC-17, with a Chevrolet engine. Mears made good use of this new car by winning the Indianapolis 500. A year later in 1989, he took a record-setting fifth pole at Indy, but retired from the race with mechanical problems. Emerson Fittipaldi won the Indianapolis 500 that year and also beat out Mears for the Championship in the last race at Laguna Seca Raceway, despite Mears winning that last race.

Also, that last race of 1989, set Mears apart from all other Indycar racers as he broke a tie with Bobby Rahal for race wins and became the most successful Indycar racer of the 1980s. In the winner's circle interview, when asked about breaking his road course dry spell when his specialty had been ovals throughout the years, he replied to Jack Arute, "Well, I guess there is hope for us old circle track drivers after all."

Fittipaldi joined Mears at Team Penske for 1990, but the year belonged to Al Unser Jr., who registered six wins. 1990 was also Mears' last in the Pennzoil paint scheme as Marlboro took over as sponsor of the team, and Jim Hall re-entered Indycar.

=== 1991–1992 ===
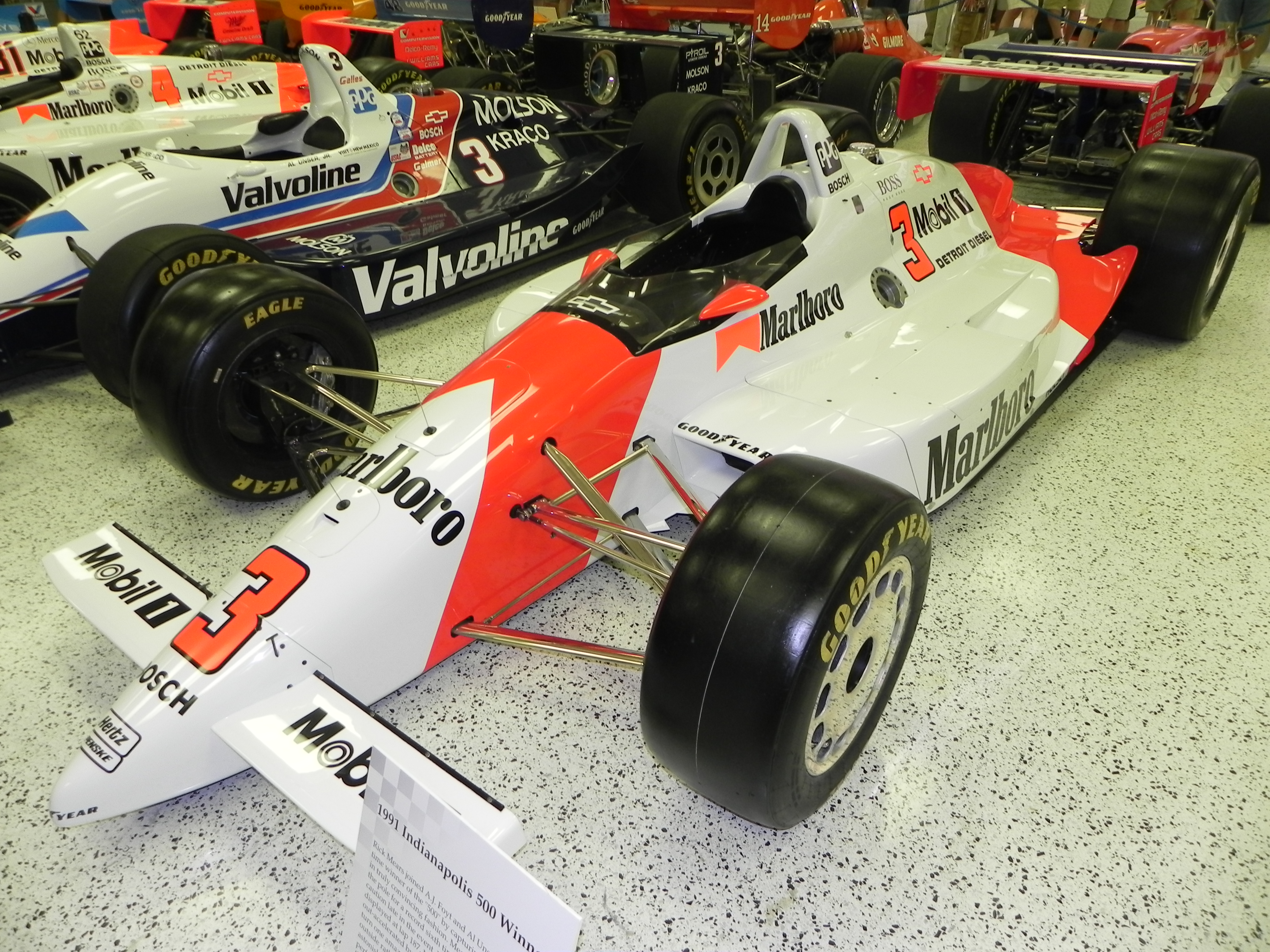
Mears' winning car from the 1991 Indianapolis 500

In 1991, during a practice session, Mears hit the wall in Indianapolis for the first time in his career. The next day, he climbed into his backup car, and claimed his record 6th career pole position.

Twenty laps from the end of the Indianapolis 500, it looked like Mears was set to be the runner-up behind Michael Andretti. However, when a subsequent yellow flag erased Andretti's 15-second lead, Mears gained the lead as Andretti opted to pit for fuel. It was a short-lived lead, as Andretti passed Mears around the outside of the first turn. A lap later Mears regained the lead, using the same move Andretti had used. Turning up his turbocharger, he then pulled away to win a fourth Indy 500, becoming the third driver to win four times at Indianapolis. Then, in August of 1991, he won his last race at the Michigan 500.

At the 1992 Indianapolis 500, Mears broke a wrist in a crash during practice and then crashed out of the race for the first time in his career while trying to avoid Jim Crawford's spinning car in turn 1. He raced only four more times in 1992 and then announced his retirement from racing at the Team Penske's Christmas party. No one except Penske and Rick's wife, Chris, knew of his plans to retire. He had just turned 41 years old.

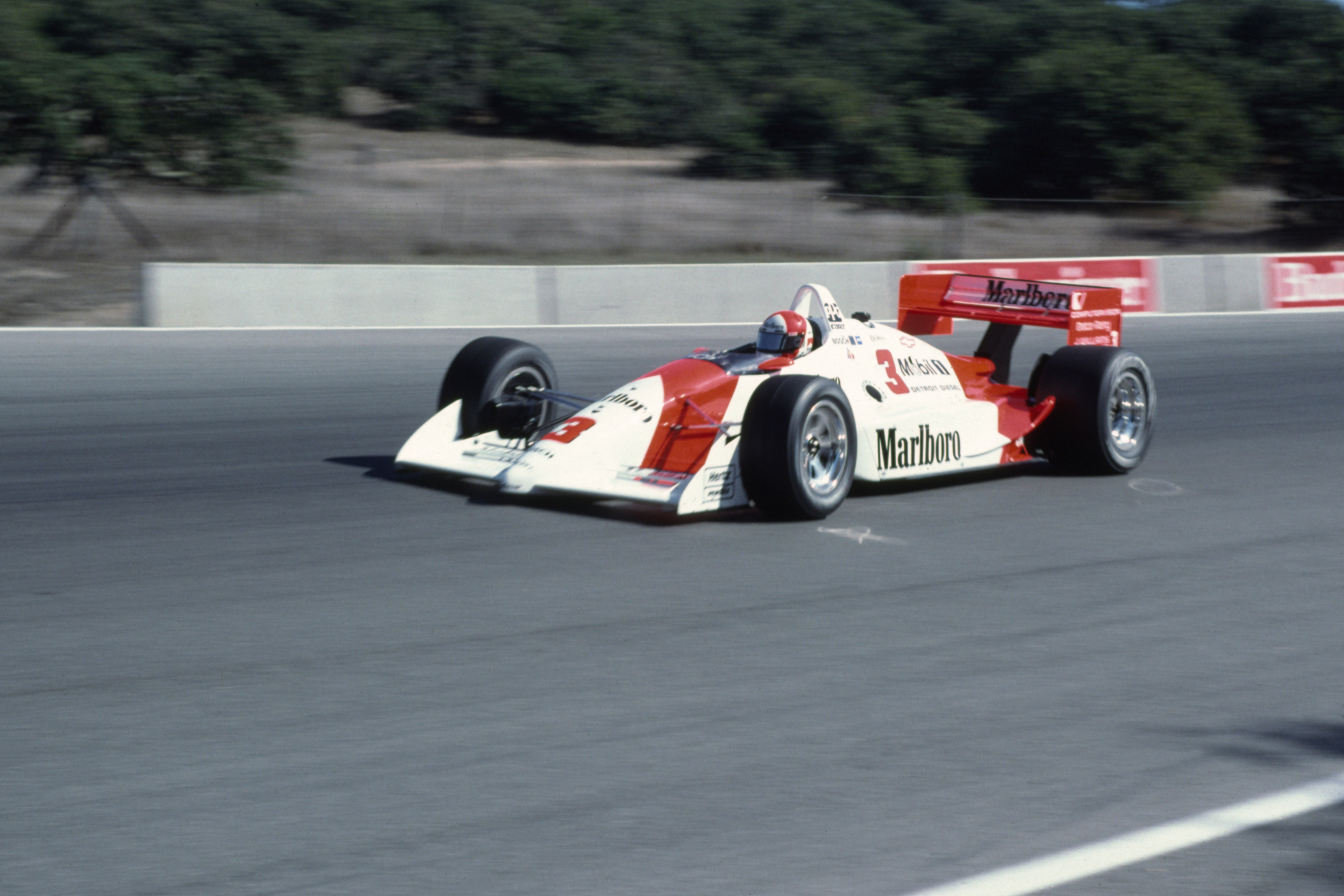
Mears' Penske PC-20 at Laguna Seca in 1991

As of 2026, Mears continues to work as a consultant and driver-mentor for Team Penske, the team where he won all of his IndyCar races. He currently acts as driver-mentor for Scott McLaughlin, Josef Newgarden, and David Malukas.

== Personal life ==
Mears is the brother of Roger Mears, father of off-road and open-wheel racer Clint Mears, and the uncle of part-time NASCAR Cup Series driver Casey Mears. His marriage to his first wife Dina ended in divorce in 1983. He married Chris Bowen in 1986whom he divorced in 2002.

== Awards ==
- In 1997, he was inducted into the International Motorsports Hall of Fame.
- Mears was inducted into the Indianapolis Motor Speedway Hall of Fame in 1998.
- He was inducted in the Motorsports Hall of Fame of America in 1998.
- Inducted into Team Penske Hall of Fame on May 25, 2017

== Motorsports career results ==
=== American Open-Wheel racing ===
==== USAC ====
(key) (Races in bold indicate pole position)

Year	Team	Chassis	Engine	1	2	3	4	5	6	7	8	9	10	11	12	13	14	15	16	17	18	Rank	Points
1976	Bill Simpson	Eagle 72	Offenhauser L4t	PHX	TRE	INDY	MIL	POC	MCH	TWS	TRE	MIL	ONT; 8	MCH								**16th**	**390**
1976	Art Sugai	Eagle 72	Offenhauser L4t												TWS; 9	PHX; 9						**16th**	**390**
1977	Art Sugai	Eagle 72	Offenhauser L4t	ONT; 24	PHX; DNQ	TWS; 15	TRE	INDY; DNQ	MIL													**19th**	**555**
1977	Theodore Racing	McLaren M16C/D	Offenhauser L4t							POC; 30	MOS	MCH; 6	TWS; 7	MIL; 5	ONT; 26	MCH; 8	PHX					**19th**	**555**
1978	Team Penske	Penske PC-6	Cosworth DFX V8t	PHX; 5	ONT	TWS	TRE	INDY; 23	MOS; 2	MIL; 1	POC	MCH; 22	ATL; 1	TWS; 9	MIL; 2	ONT; 9	MCH	TRE	SIL; 2	BRH; 1	PHX	**9th**	**2171**
1979				ONT	TWS	INDY; 1	MIL	POC	TWS	MIL												-	0
1980				ONT; 21	INDY; 5	MIL; 5	POC; 12	MOH; 9														7th	766
1981-82				INDY; 30	POC	ILL	DUQ	ISF	INDY; 2													7th	800
1982-83				SPR	DUQ	NAZ	INDY; 3															3rd	700
1983-84				DUQ	INDY; 1																	1st	1,000

==== CART Series ====
(key) (Races in bold indicate pole position)

Year	Team	Chassis	Engine	1	2	3	4	5	6	7	8	9	10	11	12	13	14	15	16	17	Rank	Points	Ref
1979	Team Penske	Penske PC-7	Cosworth DFX V8t	PHX; 2	ATL; 5	ATL; 2				MCH; 4	MCH; 5		TRE; 1	**ONT**; 2	MCH; 3	ATL; 1	PHX; 3				1st	4060	
1979	Team Penske	Penske PC-6	Cosworth DFX V8t				**INDY**; 1	TRE; 5	TRE; 7			WGL; 2									1st	4060	
1980	Team Penske	Penske PC-7	Cosworth DFX V8t	ONT; 21																	4th	2866	
1980	Team Penske	Penske PC-9	Cosworth DFX V8t		INDY; 5	MIL; 5	POC; 12	MOH; 9	MCH; 4	WGL; 2	MIL; 2	ONT; 3	MCH; 3	MEX; 1	PHX; 7						4th	2866	
1981	Team Penske	Penske PC-9B	Cosworth DFX V8t	PHX; 4	MIL	ATL; 1	**ATL**; 1	MCH; 3	RIV; 1	MIL; 2	**MCH**; 1	WGL; 1	MEX; 1	PHX; 8							1st	304	
1982	Team Penske	Penske PC-10	Cosworth DFX V8t	**PHX**; 1	**ATL**; 1	MIL; 3	CLE; 4	**MCH**; 15	**MIL**; 12	**POC**; 1	RIV; 1	**ROA**; 5	**MCH**; 25	**PHX**; 2							1st	294	
1983	Team Penske	Penske PC-11	Cosworth DFX V8t	**ATL**; 8	INDY; 3	MIL; 3	CLE; 7	MCH; 4	ROA; 17												6th	92	
1983	Team Penske	Penske PC-10B	Cosworth DFX V8t							POC; 3	RIV; 19	MOH; 9	MCH; 1	CPL; 13	LAG; 21	PHX; 17					6th	92	
1984	Team Penske	Penske PC-12	Cosworth DFX V8t	LBH; 21	PHX; 18																5th	110	
1984	Team Penske	March 84C	Cosworth DFX V8t			INDY; 1	**MIL**; 2	POR; 10	MEA; 10	CLE; 4	MCH; 3	ROA; 4	**POC**; 2	MOH; 5	SAN; Wth	MCH	PHX	LAG	CPL		5th	110	
1985	Team Penske	March 85C	Cosworth DFX V8t	LBH	INDY; 21	MIL; 3	POR	MEA	CLE	**MCH**; 30	ROA	**POC**; 1	MOH	SAN	MCH; 2	LAG	PHX	MIA			10th	51	
1986	Team Penske	March 86C	Cosworth DFX V8t	PHX; 19		**INDY**; 3	MIL; 3	POR; 16		CLE; 4	TOR; 8	**MCH**; 12	POC; 8								8th	89	
1986	Team Penske	Penske PC-15	Chevrolet 265A V8t		LBH; 20				MEA; 19						**SAN**; 18			LAG; 17		MIA; 3	8th	89	
1986	Team Penske	March 86C	Chevrolet 265A V8t											MOH; 17		**MCH**; 8	ROA; 3		PHX; 20		8th	89	
1987	Team Penske	Penske PC-16	Chevrolet 265A V8t	LBH; 9	PHX; 20			POR; 3	MEA; 18	CLE; 7	TOR; 10										5th	102	
1987	Team Penske	March 86C	Chevrolet 265A V8t			INDY; 23	MIL; 21					MCH; 21	POC; 1	ROA; 9	MOH; 4	NAZ; 3	LAG; 3	MIA; 5			5th	102	
1988	Team Penske	Penske PC-17	Chevrolet 265A V8t	**PHX**; 22	LBH; 8	**INDY**; 1	MIL; 1	POR; 6	CLE; 23	TOR; 6	MEA; 3	**MCH**; 13	**POC**; 23	MOH; 3	ROA; 12	NAZ; 7	LAG; 5	MIA; 2			4th	129	
1989	Team Penske	Penske PC-18	Chevrolet 265A V8t	**PHX**; 1	LBH; 5	**INDY**; 23	**MIL**; 1	DET; 5	POR; 8	CLE; 5	MEA; 4	TOR; 5	MCH; 7	POC; 2	MOH; 6	ROA; 3	**NAZ**; 2	**LAG**; 1			2nd	186	
1990	Team Penske	Penske PC-19	Chevrolet 265A V8t	**PHX**; 1	LBH; 6	INDY; 5	**MIL**; 2	DET; 4	POR; 5	**CLE**; 8	MEA; 2	TOR; 12	MCH; 14	DEN; 7	VAN; 4	MOH; 7	ROA; 3	NAZ; 2	LAG; 4		3rd	168	
1991	Team Penske	Penske PC-20	Chevrolet 265A V8t	SRF; 3	LBH; 4	**PHX**; 5	**INDY**; 1	**MIL**; 15	DET; 5	POR; 6	CLE; 17	**MEA**; 3	TOR; 20	**MCH**; 1	DEN; 8	VAN; 6	MOH; 6	ROA; 15	**NAZ**; 15	LAG; 5	4th	145	
1992	Team Penske	Penske PC-21	Chevrolet 265B V8t	SRF; 2	PHX; 8	LBH; 6	INDY; 26	DET	POR; 7	MIL; 16	NHA; 4	TOR	MCH; 16	CLE	ROA	VAN	MOH	NAZ	LAG		13th	47	

==== Indianapolis 500 results ====
Year	Chassis	Engine	Start	Finish	Note	Team
1977	Eagle 72	Offenhauser L4t	DNQ		Did not qualify	Art Sugai
1978	Penske PC-6	Cosworth DFX V8t	3	23	Engine Failure	Team Penske
1979	Penske PC-6	Cosworth DFX V8t	**1**	**1**	Running	Team Penske
1980	Penske PC-9	Cosworth DFX V8t	6	5	Running	Team Penske
1981	Penske PC-9B	Cosworth DFX V8t	22	30	Pit lane fire	Team Penske
1982	Penske PC-10	Cosworth DFX V8t	**1**	2	Running	Team Penske
1983	Penske PC-11	Cosworth DFX V8t	3	3	Running	Team Penske
1984	March 84C	Cosworth DFX V8t	3	**1**	Running	Team Penske
1985	March 85C	Cosworth DFX V8t	10	21	Gear linkage	Team Penske
1986	March 86C	Cosworth DFX V8t	**1**	3	Running	Team Penske
1987	March 86C	Chevrolet 265A V8t	3	23	Ignition	Team Penske
1988	Penske PC-17	Chevrolet 265A V8t	**1**	**1**	Running	Team Penske
1989	Penske PC-18	Chevrolet 265A V8t	**1**	23	Engine failure	Team Penske
1990	Penske PC-19	Chevrolet 265A V8t	2	5	Running	Team Penske
1991	Penske PC-20	Chevrolet 265A V8t	**1**	**1**	Running	Team Penske
1992	Penske PC-21	Chevrolet 265B V8t	9	26	Crash	Team Penske

==== Indy 500 qualifying results ====
Year	Att #	Date	Time	Qual; Day	Car #	Laps	Qual; Time	Qual; Speed	Rank	Start	Comment
1977	85	05-22	16:02	4	90	1	—	—	—	—	Incomplete run; pulled off
1977	96	05-22	17:21	4	90	2	—	—	—	—	Incomplete run; waved off
1978	10	05-20	12:13	1	71	4	2:59.93	200.078	4	3	
1979	34	05-13	16:39	1	9	4	3:05.82	193.736	1	1	
1980	1	05-10	11:05	1	1	4	3:12.01	187.490	7	6	
1981	34	05-16	13:41	1	6	2	—	—	—	—	Incomplete run; pulled off
1981	53	05-16	15:52	2	68	4	3:05.55	194.018	10	22	
1982	2	05-15	11:09	1	1	4	2:53.91	207.004	1	1	1 and 4 lap track records
1983	7	05-21	11:39	1	2	4	2:56.211	204.301	3	3	
1984	2	05-12	12:25	1	6	4	2:53.204	207.847	3	3	
1985	29	05-11	17:10	1	1	4	2:51.595	209.796	10	10	
1986	9	05-10	12:40	1	4	4	2:46.030	216.828	1	1	1 and 4 lap track records
1987	3	05-09	11:19	1	8T	4	2:50.239	211.467	3	3	
1988	23	05-14	13:58	1	5	4	2:44.235	219.198	1	1	1 and 4 lap track records
1989	20	05-14	14:09	1	4	4	2:40.797	223.885	1	1	1 and 4 lap track records
1990	6	05-13	16:57	1	2	4	2:40.560	224.215	2	2	
1991	16	05-11	12:51	1	3T	4	2:40.633	224.113	2	1	
1992	21	05-09	17:48	1	4	4	2:40.289	224.594	10	9	

=== International Race of Champions ===
(key) (Bold – Pole position. * – Most laps led.)

International Race of Champions results
Season	Make	Q1	Q2	Q3	1	2	3	4	Pos.	Points	Ref
1978–79	Chevy	MCH	MCH; 7	RSD	RSD	ATL			NA	-	
1979–80	Chevy	MCH	MCH; 3	RSD	RSD; 4	ATL; 2			3rd	31	
1986	Chevy				DAY; 9	MOH; 12	**TAL**; 8	GLN; 9	12th	25	
1989	Chevy				**DAY**; 8	NZH; 10	MCH; 9	GLN; 9	11th	24	

== Books ==
- Tremayne, David (1991). Racers Apart: Memories of motorsport heroes. UK: Motor Racing Publications Ltd. p. 293. ISBN 0-947981-58-6.
- Kirby, Gordon (2008). Rick Mears * Thanks: The Story of Rick Mears and the Mears Gang. US: Crash Media Group. p. 264. ISBN 978-1-905334-30-8.

Sporting positions
Preceded by Jerry Sneva	Indianapolis 500; Rookie of the Year; 1978; With Larry Rice	Succeeded by Howdy Holmes
Preceded by Al Unser	Indianapolis 500; Winner; 1979	Succeeded by Johnny Rutherford
Preceded by Tom Sneva	Indianapolis 500; Winner; 1984	Succeeded by Danny Sullivan
Preceded by Al Unser	Indianapolis 500; Winner; 1988	Succeeded by Emerson Fittipaldi
Preceded by Arie Luyendyk	Indianapolis 500; Winner; 1991	Succeeded by Al Unser Jr.
Preceded by None	PPG Indycar World Series; Champion; 1979	Succeeded by Johnny Rutherford
Preceded by Johnny Rutherford	PPG Indycar World Series; Champion; 1981-1982	Succeeded by Al Unser
