= Rahal-Hogan RH-001 =

Truesports 91C Truesports 92C Rahal/Hogan R/H-001
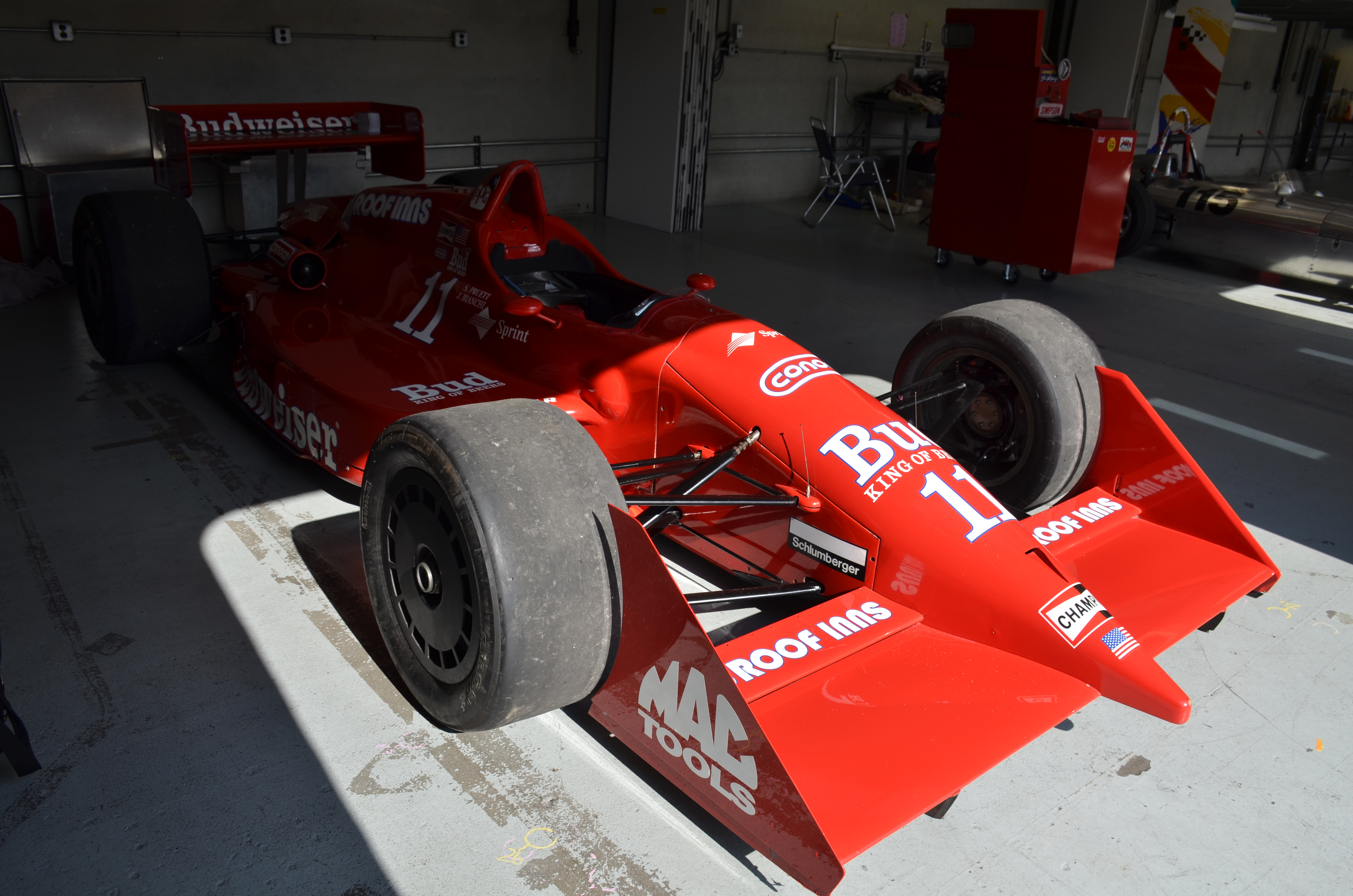
- Truesports 91C
- Category: CART IndyCar
- Constructor: Truesports/Rahal/Hogan
- Designer: Don Halliday

Technical specifications
- Chassis: Molded carbon fiber honeycomb composite tub, with Kevlar and carbon fiber body panels
- Engine: 1991-1992: Judd AV; 1992: Chevrolet Indy/A; 1993: Chevrolet Indy/C 2.65 L (161.7 cu in) V8 Turbocharged
- Transmission: Manual
- Power: 850 hp (633.8 kW) @ 13,000 rpm (Chevrolet Indy/C turbocharged V8)
- Weight: 1,550 lb (703.1 kg)
- Fuel: Methanol
- Tyres: Goodyear Eagle

Competition history
- Notable entrants: Truesports; Robco; Rahal/Hogan Racing
- Notable drivers: (United States) Scott Pruett (Australia) Geoff Brabham (United States) Brian Till (United States) Bobby Rahal (United States) Mike Groff
- Debut: 1991 Gold Coast IndyCar Grand Prix
Races	Wins	Poles
43	0	0
- Constructors' Championships: 0
- Drivers' Championships: 0

The Rahal-Hogan R/H-001, originally known as the Truesports 91C and developed into the Truesports 92C, was a CART racing car used in the early 1990s. It was developed and raced by Truesports between 1991 and 1992 and sold to Rahal-Hogan Racing in 1993, notably failing to qualify for the 1993 Indianapolis 500 with defending series champion Bobby Rahal. The car was also used by customer team Robco, a part-time CART entrant, in 1992. The car started in 43 CART races, scoring no wins before the project was ended.

== History ==
=== Truesports 91C ===
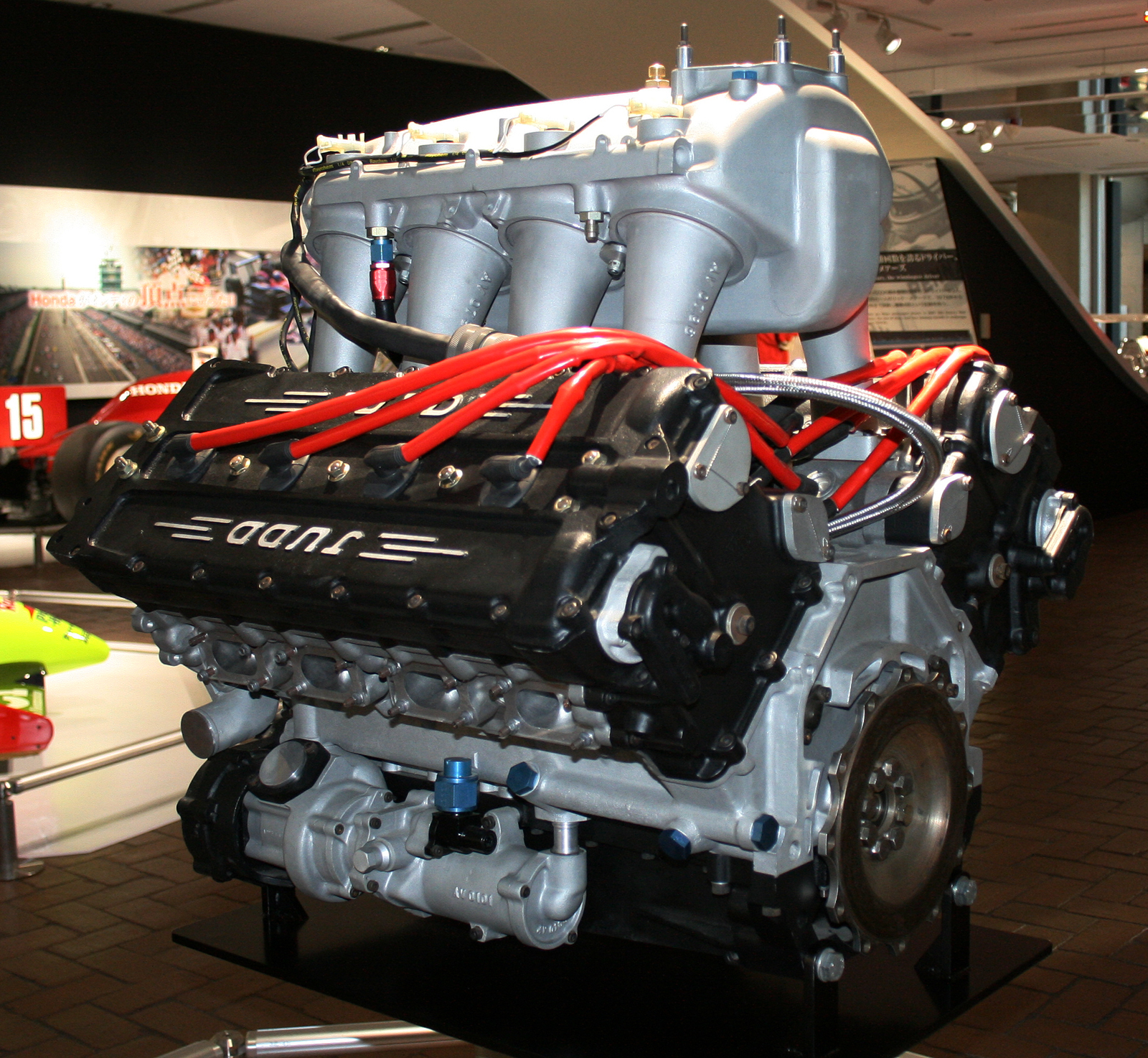
The Truesports 91C used the Judd engine in 1991 and 1992.

Steve Horne, the president of Truesports, commissioned the project in 1989 to develop the first "Made in America" Indy car since the 1986 Eagle, with a design team led by chief engineer Don Halliday and aerodynamicist Gary Grossenbacher. The Truesports 91C was built in Hilliard, Ohio, and the Ohio State University allowed the team to open a wind tunnel formerly used by the U.S. Air Force at Port Columbus, six miles from the Truesports team's workshop.

The 91C was designed around its driver, Scott Pruett, who had started driving for the team in 1989. Following a pre-season testing crash in 1990, which sidelined Pruett for the entire season due to injury, new safety features (designed in consultation with Pruett and Dr. Terry Trammell, Director of Medical Services for CART) were incorporated into the design of the 91C. Aside from the "All-American" concept, the car was designed to be more compact than its rivals with clean aerodynamics. Additionally, the chassis featured an all-composite tub, using a unique construction method whereby the layers of material were hand-fitted around a tool, rather than shaped inside a mold, with the exterior body panels separate from the tub. This was considered to provide structural benefits and more flexibility to make aerodynamic improvements.

The 91C's Judd V8 engine was developed in England by John Judd and serviced by Truesports in Ohio, but proved underpowered compared to its competition. It also suffered from reliability issues with its transverse gearbox.

During the 1991 season, Pruett qualified within the top 10 in 13 out of 17 races, and earned 67 points en route to 10th place in the championship. The car showed pace on road courses and street circuits, highlighted by a 3rd place qualifying at Portland and 4th place finishes at Toronto and Mid-Ohio. Performances on superspeedways were weaker, primarily due to a horsepower deficit.

The 91C was driven by two other drivers in competition. Truesports entered a second car for Geoff Brabham to compete at the 75th Indianapolis 500 in 1991. Brabham retired from the race with an electrical fault. Robco, which previously participated in Toyota Atlantic and Indy Lights, graduated to Indy cars in 1992 with the Truesports 91C powered by the Judd engine. The outfit entered 9 races with rookie Brian Till and scored 8 points, but did not continue onto the 1993 season.

=== Truesports 92C ===
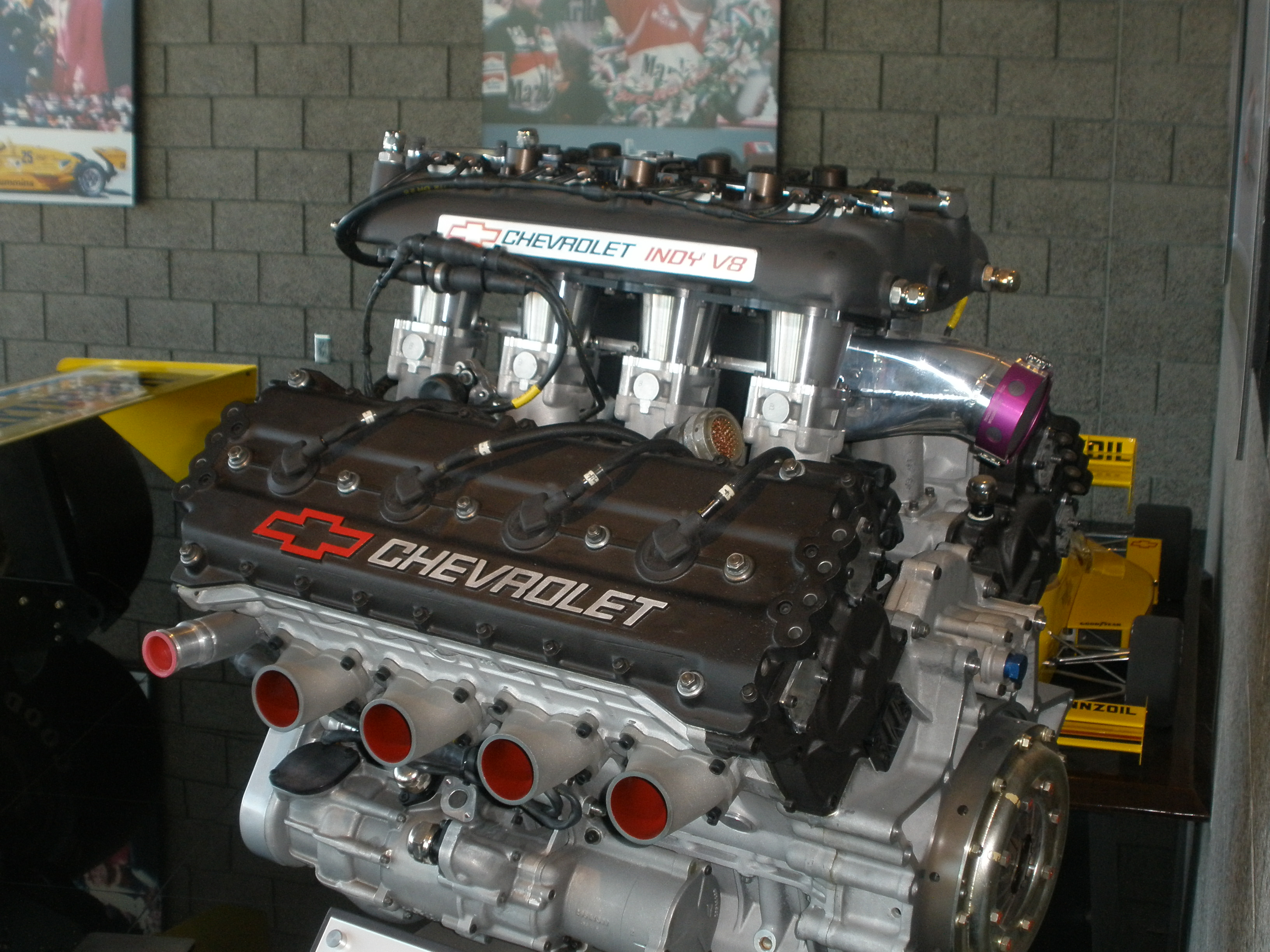
Truesports used the Chevy Indy V-8/A in 1992 and Rahal/Hogan used the Chevy Indy V-8/C in 1993.

Going into the 1992 season, Truesports arranged to use the dominant Ilmor-Chevrolet "A" engine, and developed the chassis into the Truesports 92C. Halliday reported that the car spent "hundreds of hours" in the wind tunnel and possessed excellent aerodynamics, and the team had high expectations that the car would become a winner. The 92C featured a higher nose and Corsair wing, resembling those on Formula One cars of the era. For 1992, the chassis took on the nickname the "Eagle", reviving a legacy name previously used for chassis constructed by All American Racers.

The 92C showed potential during the early season, with Pruett finished 7th at Phoenix and qualifying 3rd at Long Beach. However, following Horne's departure from the team in June 1992, the team announced that it would be disbanded following the season and ceased development of the chassis. By the end of the season, Pruett had accumulated 62 points, placing 11th in the driver's standings, with a top finish of 4th place at Vancouver. In reflection, Pruett noted that "[the car] didn’t handle, it was plagued with problems. It never really did anything. It just came up incredibly short." In total, $4 million was spent developing the chassis.

=== Rahal/Hogan R/H-001 ===
Shortly before the end of the 1992 season, Rahal-Hogan Racing co-owners Bobby Rahal and Carl Hogan elected not to run Indy cars from Lola and instead to develop the Truesports chassis, which Rahal had tested mid-season at Mid-Ohio and deemed to have potential. Halliday and Grossenbacher also joined the Rahal-Hogan team to continue development of the 92C chassis. The 92C chassis was updated to fit the new Ilmor-Chevrolet 265C engine, and the chassis was redesignated the R/H-001. Now in the black-and-yellow Miller livery, the chassis was tested in November 1992 at Phoenix International Raceway, suffering a crash in the process. The chassis would also be tested at Laguna Seca during the winter, with reportedly optimistic results.

At the first race of the 1993 season in Australia, Rahal qualified 13th and finished 6th; however, his qualifying time was over a second slower than what Pruett had achieved in the same car in 1992. Rahal struggled further at Phoenix, retiring from the race with handling problems. However, the chassis showed competitiveness at the Long Beach street circuit, where Rahal achieved the chassis' best-ever finish with a 2nd place finish.

During April, newly appointed test driver Mike Groff tested the R/H-001 at Indianapolis, achieving a top lap of 217.9 mph on April 23, but noted that the car struggled in the turns.

Groff, who was originally slated to begin his racing season after the Indianapolis 500, nonetheless appeared in official practice during the month of May, sharing the R/H-001 with Rahal. Both R/H-001 cars struggled to get up to speed during practice, and Rahal waved off his first qualification attempt on May 15 after a lap of 214.179 mph. On the second qualifying day, Rahal qualified with a 4-lap average of 217.140 mph; however, he noted that the car seemed to be "extremely sensitive to the weather, and the hotter it gets, the worse it handles." Rahal's car stayed in the field until 15 minutes prior to the end of Bump Day qualifying, when Eddie Cheever bumped Rahal with a qualifying speed of 217.599 mph. Rahal subsequently attempted to qualify his spare car in the final moments of Bump Day, but came up short with an average of 216.342 mph.

Rahal originally intended to introduce an all-new design, the R/H-002, in June; however, this project was cancelled following the team's failure to qualify for the 1993 Indianapolis 500. After Indianapolis, Rahal switched to the more conventional Lola chassis, while Groff entered selected races in a Miller Genuine Draft Light-liveried R/H-001, scoring points in 3 races and leading a lap at Milwaukee.

== Complete Indy Car World Series results ==
(key) (Results in bold indicate pole position; results in italics indicate fastest lap)

Year	Entrants	Chassis	Engines	Tyres	Drivers	No.	1	2	3	4	5	6	7	8	9	10	11	12	13	14	16	17	18	Points	D.C.
1991	Truesports	Truesports 91C	Judd AV V8 t	G			SFR	LBH	PHX	INDY	MIL	DET	POR	CLE	MEA	TOR	MCH	DEN	VAN	MOH	ROA	NAZ	LAG		
1991	Truesports	Truesports 91C	Judd AV V8 t	G	(United States) Scott Pruett	11	5	Ret	Ret	Ret	Ret	17	8	Ret	Ret	4	Ret	5	5	4	Ret	Ret	7	67	10th
1991	Truesports	Truesports 91C	Judd AV V8 t	G	(Australia) Geoff Brabham	21				Ret														0	44th
1992	Truesports	Truesports 92C	Chevrolet Indy A V8 t	G			SFR	PHX	LBH	INDY	DET	POR	MIL	NHA	TOR	MCH	CLE	ROA	VAN	MOH	NAZ	LAG			
1992	Truesports	Truesports 92C	Chevrolet Indy A V8 t	G	(United States) Scott Pruett	10	Ret	7	9	Ret	Ret	10	11	6	Ret	5	7	9	4	9	10	14		62	11th
1992	Robco	Truesports 92C	Judd AV V8 t	G	(United States) Brian Till	24			11		Ret	Ret		12	10		15	11		14		Ret		8	23rd
1993	Rahal/Hogan Racing	R/H-001	Chevrolet Indy C V8 t	G			SFR	PHX	LBH	INDY	MIL	DET	POR	CLE	TOR	MCH	NHA	ROA	VAN	MOH	NAZ	LAG			
1993	Rahal/Hogan Racing	R/H-001	Chevrolet Indy C V8 t	G	(United States) Bobby Rahal	1	6	Ret	2	DNQ														133^{1}	4th^{1}
1993	Rahal/Hogan Racing	R/H-001	Chevrolet Indy C V8 t	G	(United States) Mike Groff	1				DNQ														8^{1}	23rd^{1}
1993	Rahal/Hogan Racing	R/H-001	Chevrolet Indy C V8 t	G	(United States) Mike Groff	26					Ret	11	9				11							8^{1}	23rd^{1}

^1 Includes points scored by the Lola T93/00.
