= Penske PC-19 =

- Category: CART IndyCar
- Constructor: Penske Cars Ltd.
- Designer: Nigel Bennett
- Predecessor: Penske PC-18
- Successor: Penske PC-20

Technical specifications
- Suspension (front): pushrod
- Suspension (rear): pushrod
- Engine: Ilmor-Chevrolet 265A V8 90° turbocharged Mid-engined, longitudinally mounted
- Transmission: manual
- Fuel: Methanol
- Tyres: Goodyear Eagle

Competition history
- Notable entrants: Penske Racing
- Notable drivers: Rick Mears; Emerson Fittipaldi; Danny Sullivan; Paul Tracy
- Debut: 1990 Autoworks 200
| Races | Wins | Poles |
|---|---|---|
| 33 | 4 | 9 |

The Penske PC-19 also known as the Penske 90 was a CART Penske Racing car which was constructed for competition in the 1990 season. The chassis was fielded by Penske Racing.

Emerson Fittipaldi won the pole position for the 1990 Indianapolis 500 with the car.

== Complete Indy Car World Series results ==
(key) (Results in bold indicate pole position; results in italics indicate fastest lap)

| Year | Team | Engine | Tyres | Driver | No. | 1 | 2 | 3 | 4 | 5 | 6 | 7 | 8 | 9 | 10 | 11 | 12 | 13 | 14 | 15 | 16 | 17 | Points | D.C. |
|---|---|---|---|---|---|---|---|---|---|---|---|---|---|---|---|---|---|---|---|---|---|---|---|---|
| 1990 | Team Penske | Chevrolet 265A V8t | G | | | PHX | LBH | INDY | MIL | DET | POR | CLE | MEA | TOR | MCH | DEN | VAN | MDO | ROA | NAZ | LAG | | | |
| 1990 | Team Penske | Chevrolet 265A V8t | G | (Brazil) Emerson Fittipaldi | 1 | 5 | 2 | **3** | 3 | 7 | 9 | 3 | 6 | 20 | **17** | 18 | 6 | 12 | 2 | 1 | 6 | | 144 | 5th |
| 1990 | Team Penske | Chevrolet 265A V8t | G | (United States) Rick Mears | 2 | **1** | 6 | 5 | **2** | 4 | 5 | **8** | 2 | 12 | 14 | 7 | 4 | 7 | 3 | 2 | 4 | | 168 | 3rd |
| 1990 | Team Penske | Chevrolet 265A V8t | G | (United States) Danny Sullivan | 7 | 6 | 3 | 32 | 8 | 14 | **4** | 1 | 14 | **4** | 21 | 2 | 2 | 5 | **16** | 18 | **1** | | 139 | 6th |
| 1991 | Team Penske | Chevrolet 265A V8t | G | | | SFR | LBH | PHX | INDY | MIL | DET | POR | CLE | MEA | TOR | MCH | DEN | VAN | MDO | ROA | NAZ | LAG | | |
| 1991 | Team Penske | Chevrolet 265A V8t | G | (Canada) Paul Tracy | 17 | | | | | | | | | | | 21 | | | | | 7 | 25 | 6 | 21st |
| 1991 | Bettenhausen Motorsports | Chevrolet 265A V8t | G | (United States) Tony Bettenhausen Jr. | 16 | 10 | 12 | 18 | 9 | 12 | 13 | 13 | 13 | 21 | 11 | 5 | 10 | 18 | 18 | 13 | 10 | 16 | 27 | 14th |
| 1991 | Bettenhausen Motorsports | Chevrolet 265A V8t | G | (Netherlands) Cornelius Euser | 90 | | | | | | | | | | | | | | | | | 10 | 3 | 27th |
