= Penske PC-20 =

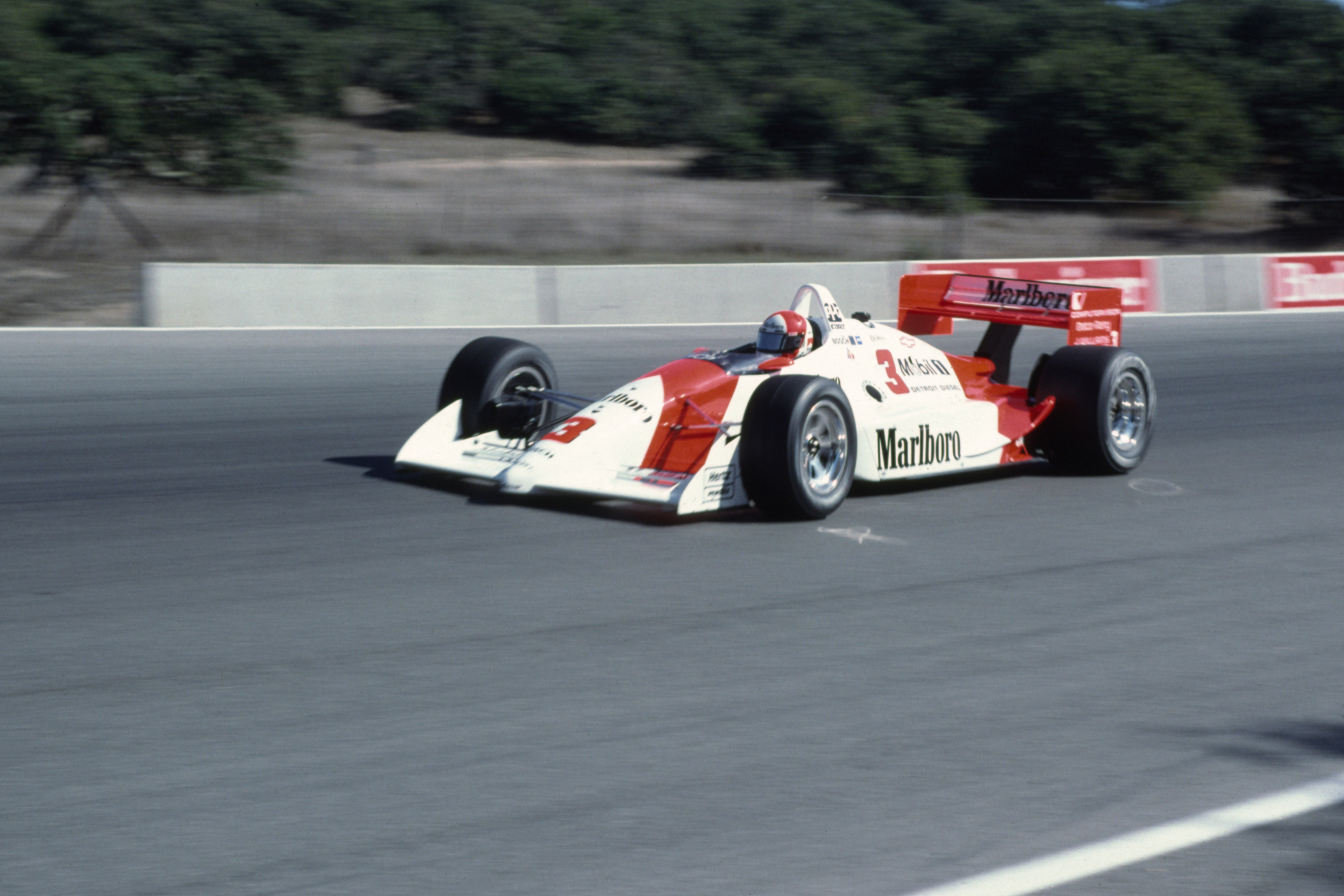
- Category: CART IndyCar
- Constructor: Penske Cars Ltd.
- Designer: Nigel Bennett
- Predecessor: Penske PC-19
- Successor: Penske PC-21

Technical specifications
- Suspension (front): pushrod
- Suspension (rear): pushrod
- Engine: Ilmor-Chevrolet 265A V8 90° turbocharged Mid-engined, longitudinally mounted
- Transmission: manual
- Fuel: Methanol, supplied by Mobil
- Tyres: Goodyear Eagle

Competition history
- Notable entrants: Penske Racing
- Notable drivers: 3 Rick Mears; 5 Emerson Fittipaldi; 17 Paul Tracy
- Debut: 1991 Gold Coast IndyCar Grand Prix
Races	Wins	Poles
32	3	8

The Penske PC-20 was a CART Penske Racing car which competed in the 1991 and 1992 seasons. In 1991, it raced in all seventeen events, scoring 3 wins, two with Rick Mears, and one with Emerson Fittipaldi, placed 4th and 5th at the season's end respectively. The most remarkable success of the PC-20 was the 1991 Indianapolis 500 win by Mears, his 4th win at the Brickyard. The car was designed by Nigel Bennett, his 4th for Penske Racing. In 1992, it also raced alongside the Penske PC-21.

== Racing history ==
The PC-20 was powered by an Ilmor-Chevrolet V8 265A turbo engine and it debuted at the 1991 Gold Coast IndyCar Grand Prix where it qualified 6th and 7th with Fittipaldi and Mears, respectively. In the race Mears scored a 3rd place, while Fittipaldi retired with drive shaft failure. After a 4th place finish in Long Beach with Mears, and a 3rd place finish at Phoenix with Fittipaldi, the PC-20 scored its biggest win at 1991 Indianapolis 500. In qualifying, Mears clinched his 6th pole at Indy 500 (224.113 mph). Mears battled with Michael Andretti during final stages of the race, who led Rick Mears by 15 seconds when a caution flag flies on lap 182. Andretti was able to make it to the pits for fuel under the yellow, while Mears lined up as the leader. Andretti then completed a daring pass around the outside of Mears into turn 1 on the restart. Exactly one lap later, Mears repeated the move on Andretti, passing him on the outside of turn one to re-take the lead. Another caution does not alter the result as Mears powered away again to his record-tying fourth Indianapolis 500 Victory, tying A.J Foyt and Al Unser, Sr. During the rest of the season, the Penskes weren't able to compete with Michael Andretti dominance, who clinched the title with 8 season wins. Nevertheless, Fittipaldi won at Detroit, and Mears scored a win at Michigan 500, as confirmation of the PC-20's competitive form on long ovals.

In 1992, the PC-20 chassis was used by Penske Racing, as a third car for Paul Tracy in early stages of season (Tracy was driving the #4 car in second half of the season as replacement for injured Mears), and for entire season by Bettenhausen Racing, with Tony Bettenhausen Jr. and Stefan Johansson sharing the #16 car, with two 3rd places by Johansson as best results. It raced along the PC-21.

The PC-21 was instead powered by an Ilmor-Chevrolet 265B V8 turbo engine. It made its race debut in the Gold Coast, Australia, at the renamed Daikyo IndyCar Grand Prix where it finished first and second, driven by Fittipaldi and Mears, respectively. It is also the last car that Mears drove to his final career podium finish.

== Complete Indy Car World Series results ==
(key) (Results in bold indicate pole position)

Year	Team	Engine	Tyres	Driver	No.	1	2	3	4	5	6	7	8	9	10	11	12	13	14	15	16	17	Points	D.C.
1991	Team Penske	Chevrolet 265A V8t	G			SFR	LBH	PHX	INDY	MIL	DET	POR	CLE	MEA	TOR	MCH	DEN	VAN	MDO	ROA	NAZ	LAG		
1991	Team Penske	Chevrolet 265A V8t	G	(United States) Rick Mears	3	3	4	**5**	**1**	**15**	5	6	17	**3**	20	**1**	8	6	6	15	**15**	5	**145**	**4th**
1991	Team Penske	Chevrolet 265A V8t	G	(Brazil) Emerson Fittipaldi	5	19	17	3	11	8	1	**2**	**2**	7	21	20	2	17	2	6	8	4	**140**	**5th**
1992	Team Penske	Chevrolet 265A V8t	G			SFR	PHX	LBH	INDY	DET	POR	MIL	NHA	TOR	MCH	CLE	ROA	VAN	MDO	NAZ	LAG			
1992	Team Penske	Chevrolet 265A V8t	G	(Canada) Paul Tracy	7		4		20														**59***	**12th***
1992	Bettenhausen Motorsports	Chevrolet 265A V8t	G	(United States) Tony Bettenhausen Jr.	16	13	11	15	DNQ		21	18			9								**6**	**24th**
1992	Bettenhausen Motorsports	Chevrolet 265A V8t	G	(Sweden) Stefan Johansson	16					3			10	11		9	19	3	6	21	11		**47**	**14th**

*Only results with PC-20 chassis are shown. Tracy raced in a total of 11 events in 1992 season, scoring 59 points and 12th final place.
