= 1991 Gold Coast IndyCar Grand Prix =

Coordinates: 27°59′17.9″S 153°25′42.1″E

(Australia) 1991 Surfers Paradise
Race details
- Race 1 of 17 in the 1991 IndyCar season
- Map of the track
- Date: 17 March, 1991
- Official name: 1991 Gold Coast IndyCar Grand Prix
- Location: Surfers Paradise Street Circuit; Queensland, Australia
- Course: Temporary Street Circuit; 2.794 mi / 4.496 km
- Distance: 65 laps 181.610 mi / 292.240 km

Pole position
- Driver: (United States) Michael Andretti (Newman-Haas Racing)
- Time: 1:40.047

Podium
- First: (United States) John Andretti (Racing Team VDS)
- Second: (United States) Bobby Rahal (Galles-Kraco Racing)
- Third: (United States) Rick Mears (Marlboro Team Penske)

The 1991 Gold Coast IndyCar Grand Prix was the opening round of the 1991 CART PPG Indy Car World Series, held on 17 March 1991 on the Surfers Paradise Street Circuit, Queensland, Australia. This was the first ever race for the North American–based Champ Car World Series held in the Southern Hemisphere.

== Qualifying results ==
Pos	No	Nat	Name	Team	Car	Time
1	2	(United States)	Michael Andretti	Newman-Haas Racing	Lola T91/00 Chevrolet-Ilmor A	1:40.047
2	8	(United States)	Eddie Cheever	Chip Ganassi Racing	Lola T91/00 Chevrolet-Ilmor A	1:40.090
3	1	(United States)	Al Unser Jr.	Galles-Kraco Racing	Lola T91/00 Chevrolet-Ilmor A	1:40.149
4	18	(United States)	Bobby Rahal	Galles-Kraco Racing	Lola T91/00 Chevrolet-Ilmor A	1:40.330
5	6	(United States)	Mario Andretti	Newman-Haas Racing	Lola T91/00 Chevrolet-Ilmor A	1:40.566
6	5	(Brazil)	Emerson Fittipaldi	Team Penske	Penske PC-20 Chevrolet-Ilmor A	1:40.774
7	3	(United States)	Rick Mears	Team Penske	Penske PC-20 Chevrolet-Ilmor A	1:40.998
8	9	(Netherlands)	Arie Luyendyk	Granatelli Racing Team	Lola T91/00 Chevrolet-Ilmor A	1:42.125
9	4	(United States)	John Andretti	Racing Team VDS	Lola T91/00 Chevrolet-Ilmor A	1:42.353
10	20	(United States)	Danny Sullivan	Patrick Racing	Lola T91/00 Alfa Romeo	1:42.392
11	11	(United States)	Scott Pruett	Truesports	Truesports 91C Judd	1:43.229
12	16	(United States)	Tony Bettenhausen Jr.	Bettenhausen Racing	Penske PC-19 Chevrolet-Ilmor A	1:43.700
13	15	(Canada)	Scott Goodyear	Walker Motorsport	Lola T91/00 Judd	1:44.006
14	22	(United States)	Scott Brayton	Dick Simon Racing	Lola T91/00 Chevrolet-Ilmor A	1:44.188
15	31	(United States)	Ted Prappas	P.I.G. Enterprises	Lola T89/00 Judd	1:45.377
16	86	(United States)	Jeff Andretti	Bayside Disposal Racing	Lola T91/00 Cosworth DFS	1:45.396
17	50	(United States)	Mike Groff	Euromotorsport	Lola T90/00 Cosworth DFS	1:45.506
18	42	(Italy)	Franco Scapini	Euromotorsport	Lola T91/00 Cosworth DFS	1:45.839
19	7	(Japan)	Hiro Matsushita	Dick Simon Racing	Lola T90/00 Cosworth DFS	1:46.086
20	19	(United States)	Randy Lewis	Dale Coyne Racing	Lola T90/00 Cosworth DFS	1:47.686
21	39	(United States)	Dennis Vitolo	Dale Coyne Racing	Lola T89/00 Cosworth DFS	1:48.103
22	21	(United States)	Dean Hall	Leader Cards Racing	Lola T90/00 Cosworth DFS	1:48.410
23	12	(United States)	Mark Dismore	Arciero Racing	Penske PC-17 Buick V-6	1:48.518
24	90	(United States)	Buddy Lazier	Dale Coyne Racing	Lola T88/00 Cosworth DFX	1:49.930
25	44	(United States)	Phil Krueger	U. S. Engineering	Lola T89/00 Cosworth DFS	1:52.902

== Race results ==
Pos	No	Driver	Team	Laps	Time/retired	Grid	Points
1	4	(United States) John Andretti	Racing Team VDS	65	2:12:54.820	9	20
2	18	(United States) Bobby Rahal	Galles-Kraco Racing	65	+12.7 secs	4	16
3	3	(United States) Rick Mears	Team Penske	65		7	14
4	20	(United States) Danny Sullivan	Patrick Racing	65		10	12
5	11	(United States) Scott Pruett	Truesports	65		11	10
6	22	(United States) Scott Brayton	Dick Simon Racing	65		14	8
7	86	(United States) Jeff Andretti	Bayside Disposal Racing	65		16	6
8	50	(United States) Mike Groff	Euromotorsport	64	+ 1 lap	17	5
9	9	(Netherlands) Arie Luyendyk	Granatelli Racing Team	64	+ 1 lap	8	4
10	16	(United States) Tony Bettenhausen Jr.	Bettenhausen Racing	62	+ 3 laps	12	3
11	42	(Italy) Franco Scapini	Euromotorsport	59	+ 6 laps	18	2
12	21	(United States) Dean Hall	Leader Cards Racing	58	Contact	22	1
13	19	(United States) Randy Lewis	Dale Coyne Racing	58	Contact	20	
14	2	(United States) Michael Andretti	Newman-Haas Racing	57	Brakes	1	1
15	8	(United States) Eddie Cheever	Chip Ganassi Racing	42	Contact	2	
16	1	(United States) Al Unser Jr.	Galles-Kraco Racing	41	Contact	3	1
17	6	(United States) Mario Andretti	Newman-Haas Racing	41	Contact	5	
18	44	(United States) Phil Krueger	U. S. Engineering	32	Overheated	5	
19	5	(Brazil) Emerson Fittipaldi	Team Penske	27	Driveshaft	6	
20	12	(United States) Mark Dismore	Arciero Racing	22	Engine	23	
21	7	(Japan) Hiro Matsushita	Dick Simon Racing	13	Contact	19	
22	31	(United States) Ted Prappas	P.I.G. Enterprises	8	Engine	15	
23	15	(Canada) Scott Goodyear	Walker Motorsport	5	Engine	13	
24	39	(United States) Dennis Vitolo	Dale Coyne Racing	5	Engine	13	
25	90	(United States) Buddy Lazier	Dale Coyne Racing	1	Suspension	24	

=== Statistics ===
- Average Speed 81.953 mph
- Full-Course Cautions: 3 for 15 laps
- Lead changes: 4

Previous race:	CART PPG Indy Car World Series; 1991 season	Next race: 1991 Toyota Grand Prix of Long Beach
Previous race: inaugural	1991 Gold Coast IndyCar Grand Prix	Next race: 1992 Daikyo IndyCar Grand Prix
