= 1992 Molson Indy Toronto =

1992 CART World Series race held at Toronto, Ontario, Canada

(Canada) 1992 Toronto
Race details
- Race 9 of 16 in the 1992 IndyCar season
- Map of the track
- Date: 19 July, 1992
- Official name: 1992 Molson Indy Toronto
- Location: Exhibition Place; Toronto, Ontario, Canada
- Course: Toronto Street Circuit; 1.780 mi / 2.781 km
- Distance: 103 laps 183.3 mi / 286.4 km
- Weather: Mainly clear with temperatures reaching up to 23 °C (73 °F)

Pole position
- Driver: (United States) Bobby Rahal (Rahal-Hogan Racing)

Podium
- First: (United States) Michael Andretti (Newman-Haas Racing)
- Second: (United States) Bobby Rahal (Rahal-Hogan Racing)
- Third: (United States) Danny Sullivan (Galles-Kraco Racing)

The 1992 Molson Indy Toronto was the ninth round of the 1992 CART World Series season, held on 19 July 1992 at Toronto Street Circuit, Toronto, Ontario, Canada.

== Results ==
| Key | Meaning |
|---|---|
| R | Rookie |
| W | Past winner |

=== Qualifying results ===
| Pos | Nat | Name | Team | Car | Qual |
|---|---|---|---|---|---|
| 1 | (United States) | Bobby Rahal W | Rahal-Hogan Racing | Lola T92/00 Chevrolet-Ilmor A | 108.505 |
| 2 | (Brazil) | Emerson Fittipaldi W | Team Penske | Penske PC21-92 Chevrolet-Ilmor B | 108.416 |
| 3 | (United States) | Michael Andretti W | Newman-Haas Racing | Lola T92/00 Ford XB Cosworth | 108.390 |
| 4 | (Canada) | Paul Tracy | Team Penske | Penske PC21-92 Chevrolet-Ilmor B | 107.958 |
| 5 | (United States) | Mario Andretti | Newman-Haas Racing | Lola T92/00 Ford XB Cosworth | 107.862 |
| 6 | (United States) | Danny Sullivan | Galles-Kraco Racing | Galmer G92 Chevrolet-Ilmor A | 107.717 |
| 7 | (Brazil) | Raul Boesel | Dick Simon Racing | Lola T92/00 Chevrolet-Ilmor A | 107.519 |
| 8 | (United States) | Scott Pruett | Truesports | Truesports 92C Chevrolet-Ilmor A | 107.509 |
| 9 | (United States) | John Andretti | Racing Team VDS | Lola T92/00 Chevrolet-Ilmor A | 107.368 |
| 10 | (United States) | Al Unser Jr. W | Galles-Kraco Racing | Galmer G92 Chevrolet-Ilmor A | 107.263 |
| 11 | (Canada) | Scott Goodyear | Walker Motorsport | Lola T91/00 Chevrolet-Ilmor A | 107.041 |
| 12 | (United States) | Eddie Cheever | Chip Ganassi Racing | Lola T92/00 Ford XB Cosworth | 106.814 |
| 13 | (Sweden) | Stefan Johansson R | Bettenhausen Racing | Penske PC20-92 Chevrolet-Ilmor B | 106.571 |
| 14 | (United States) | Scott Brayton | Dick Simon Racing | Lola T92/00 Chevrolet-Ilmor A | 106.044 |
| 15 | (United States) | Robby Gordon R | Chip Ganassi Racing | Lola T92/00 Ford XB Cosworth | 105.899 |
| 16 | (United States) | Brian Till R | RAL Group | Truesports 91C Judd | 105.769 |
| 17 | (United States) | Ted Prappas | P.I.G. Enterprises | Lola T91/00 Chevrolet-Ilmor A | 105.646 |
| 18 | (Germany) | Christian Danner R | EEI | Lola T91/00 Cosworth DFS | 104.822 |
| 19 | (United States) | Jimmy Vasser R | P.I.G. Enterprises | Lola T91/00 Cosworth DFS | 104.521 |
| 20 | (United States) | Buddy Lazier | Hemelgarn Racing | Lola T91/00 Buick | 103.849 |
| 21 | (Switzerland) | Jon Beekhuis | Gilmore Racing | Lola T92/00 Chevrolet-Ilmor A | 102.576 |
| 22 | (Canada) | Ross Bentley | Edge Superior | Lola T90/00 Buick | 100.757 |
| 23 | (United States) | Jeff Wood | Arciero Racing | Lola T91/00 Buick | 100.690 |
| 24 | (Italy) | Vinicio Salmi R | Euromotorsport | Lola T91/00 Cosworth DFS | 96.494 |
| 25 | (Belgium) | Éric Bachelart R | Dale Coyne Racing | Lola T90/00 Cosworth DFS | no speed |

=== Starting grid ===
| Row | Inside | Outside |
|---|---|---|
| 1 | (United States) 12 – Bobby Rahal W | (Brazil) 5 – Emerson Fittipaldi W |
| 2 | (United States) 1 – Michael Andretti W | (Canada) 4 – Paul Tracy |
| 3 | (United States) 2 – Mario Andretti | (United States) 18 – Danny Sullivan |
| 4 | (Brazil) 23 – Raul Boesel | (United States) 10 – Scott Pruett |
| 5 | (United States) 8 – John Andretti | (United States) 3 – Al Unser Jr. W |
| 6 | (Canada) 15 – Scott Goodyear | (United States) 9 – Eddie Cheever |
| 7 | (Sweden) 16 – Stefan Johansson R | (United States) 22 – Scott Brayton |
| 8 | (United States) 6 – Robby Gordon R | (United States) 24 – Brian Till R |
| 9 | (United States) 31 – Ted Prappas | (Germany) 50 – Christian Danner R |
| 10 | (United States) 47 – Jimmy Vasser R | (United States) 21 – Buddy Lazier |
| 11 | (Switzerland) 14 – Jon Beekhuis | (Canada) 39 – Ross Bentley |
| 12 | (United States) 30 – Jeff Wood | (Italy) 42 – Vinicio Salmi R |
| 13 | (Belgium) 19 – Éric Bachelart R | |

=== Race results ===
| FP | SP | No. | Driver | Qual | C | E | Laps | Status | Team | Pts |
|---|---|---|---|---|---|---|---|---|---|---|
| 1 | 3 | 1 | (United States) Michael Andretti W | 108.390 | L | F | 103 | 97.898 mph | Newman-Haas Racing | 21 |
| 2 | 1 | 12 | (United States) Bobby Rahal W | 108.505 | L | Ch | 103 | +20.833 seconds | Rahal-Hogan Racing | 17 |
| 3 | 6 | 18 | (United States) Danny Sullivan | 107.717 | G | Ch | 102 | Flagged | Galles-Kraco Racing | 14 |
| 4 | 5 | 2 | (United States) Mario Andretti | 107.862 | L | F | 102 | Flagged | Newman-Haas Racing | 12 |
| 5 | 9 | 8 | (United States) John Andretti | 107.368 | L | Ch | 102 | Flagged | Racing Team VDS | 10 |
| 6 | 11 | 15 | (Canada) Scott Goodyear | 107.041 | L | Ch | 101 | Flagged | Walker Motorsport | 8 |
| 7 | 10 | 3 | (United States) Al Unser Jr. W | 107.263 | G | Ch | 101 | Flagged | Galles-Kraco Racing | 6 |
| 8 | 15 | 6 | (United States) Robby Gordon R | 105.899 | L | F | 100 | Flagged | Chip Ganassi Racing | 5 |
| 9 | 12 | 9 | (United States) Eddie Cheever | 106.814 | L | F | 99 | Engine | Chip Ganassi Racing | 4 |
| 10 | 16 | 24 | (United States) Brian Till R | 105.769 | T | J | 99 | Flagged | RAL Group | 3 |
| 11 | 13 | 16 | (Sweden) Stefan Johansson R | 106.571 | P | Ch | 98 | Flagged | Bettenhausen Racing | 2 |
| 12 | 19 | 47 | (United States) Jimmy Vasser R | 104.521 | L | Co | 98 | Flagged | P.I.G. Enterprises | 1 |
| 13 | 23 | 30 | (United States) Jeff Wood | 100.690 | L | B | 95 | Flagged | Arciero Racing | |
| 14 | 22 | 39 | (Canada) Ross Bentley | 100.757 | L | B | 94 | Flagged | Edge Superior | |
| 15 | 20 | 21 | (United States) Buddy Lazier | 103.849 | L | B | 91 | Flagged | Hemelgarn Racing | |
| 16 | 18 | 50 | (Germany) Christian Danner R | 104.822 | L | Co | 87 | Engine | EEI | |
| 17 | 14 | 22 | (United States) Scott Brayton | 106.044 | L | Ch | 67 | Engine | Dick Simon Racing | |
| 18 | 21 | 14 | (Switzerland) Jon Beekhuis | 102.576 | L | Ch | 64 | Rear wing | Gilmore Racing | |
| 19 | 2 | 5 | (Brazil) Emerson Fittipaldi W | 108.416 | P | Ch | 61 | Electrical | Team Penske | |
| 20 | 24 | 42 | (Italy) Vinicio Salmi R | 96.494 | L | Co | 40 | Electrical | Euromotorsport | |
| 21 | 4 | 4 | (Canada) Paul Tracy | 107.958 | P | Ch | 38 | Gearbox | Team Penske | |
| 22 | 7 | 23 | (Brazil) Raul Boesel | 107.519 | L | Ch | 28 | Gearbox | Dick Simon Racing | |
| 23 | 17 | 31 | (United States) Ted Prappas | 105.646 | L | Ch | 18 | Engine | P.I.G. Enterprises | |
| 24 | 25 | 19 | (Belgium) Éric Bachelart R | no speed | L | Co | 8 | Crash T3 | Dale Coyne Racing | |
| 25 | 8 | 10 | (United States) Scott Pruett | 107.509 | T | Ch | 3 | Crash T3 | Truesports | |

*C Chassis: G=Galmer, L=Lola, P=Penske, T=TrueSports

*E Engine: B=Buick, Ch=Ilmor-Chevrolet, Co=Cosworth, F=Ford J=Judd

All cars utilized Goodyear tires.

==== Race statistics ====
Lap Leaders
| Laps | Leader |
|---|---|
| 1–103 | Michael Andretti |

Total laps led
| Laps | Leader |
|---|---|
| Michael Andretti | 103 |

Cautions: 1 for 8 laps
| Laps | Reason |
|---|---|
| 9–16 | Crash turn 3 – Bachelart |

Notes

- Time of race 1:52:21.00

Point Scoring System:

- Points are awarded based on each driver's resulting place (regardless of whether the car is running at the end of the race):

| Position | 1 | 2 | 3 | 4 | 5 | 6 | 7 | 8 | 9 | 10 | 11 | 12 |
| Points | 20 | 16 | 14 | 12 | 10 | 8 | 6 | 5 | 4 | 3 | 2 | 1 |

Bonus Points:

- 1 For Pole Position
- 1 For Leading The Most Laps of the Race

== Championship standings after the race ==
Drivers' Championship standings

| | Pos | Driver | Points |
| | 1 | (United States) Bobby Rahal | 134 |
| 2 | 2 | (United States) Michael Andretti | 100 |
| 1 | 3 | (United States) Al Unser Jr. | 91 |
| 1 | 4 | (Brazil) Emerson Fittipaldi | 82 |
| | 5 | (United States) Danny Sullivan | 71 |

- Note: Only the top five positions are included.

== Media ==
=== Television ===
The race was carried on same day tape delay flag-to-flag coverage in the United States on ABC Sports and live flag-to-flag coverage in Canada on CBC Sports.

ABC
| Booth Announcers | | Pit reporters |
|---|---|---|
| Announcer | Paul Page | Jack Arute; Gary Gerould |
| Color | Sam Posey; Bobby Unser | Jack Arute; Gary Gerould |

=== Radio ===
The race was broadcast on radio by the IMS Radio Network.

| Previous race: 1992 New England 200 | PPG Indy Car World Series; 1992 season | Next race: 1992 Marlboro 500 |
| Previous race: 1991 Molson Indy Toronto | 1992 Molson Indy Toronto | Next race: 1993 Molson Indy Toronto |
