= E. J. Lenzi =

Former American racing driver

Eugene J. Lenzi is a former American racing driver and currently owns a restaurant in Chicago. Lenzi raced in the Atlantic Championship, Formula Super Vee among other series.

== Racing career ==
Lenzi grew up with Bignotti-Cotter Racing team owner Dan Cotter as their neighbor. Lenzi first appeared on the national racing scene in the SCCA National Championship Runoffs in 1984 and a year later, 1985. In 1985 and 1986, Lenzi joined Prather Racing. Prather Racing was headed by Edward Sexton and was the Swift dealer for the SCCA Central division.

With Intercar Racing, Lenzi graduated into the SCCA Formula Super Vee. He started the season in a Martini Mk.47. Lenzi scored his best finish in a Ralt in sixth place at Detroit. Later in the season, Lenzi raced the unsuccessful Anson SA6 (designed by Gary Anderson.

Befriended engineer Peter Jacobs and Lenzi founded Baci Racing in 1987 to race in the SCCA Formula Super Vee. At the Night before the 500, Lenzi won his only race in the series, at Indianapolis Raceway Park. In 1988, Lenzi was successful in the series finishing second in the championship. For 1989, Lenzi graduated into the Atlantic Championship, scoring his best finish at Watkins Glen International. Lenzi finished in third place, behind Jocko Cunningham and Colin Trueman.

== Restaurant business ==
Up until 1994, Lenzi worked at Gene & Georgetti's, a steakhouse founded in Chicago in the 1940s. The restaurant was founded by Lenzi's grandfather, Gene Michelotti. The company sponsored Lenzi's racing career through most of the years. In 1992, Gene & Georgetti's was sold by Michelotti to Marion and Tony Durpetti. In 1994, Lenzi founded his own steakhouse, Erie Cafe, with his wife Toni Lenzi.

=== Great steakhouse lawsuit ===
Lenzi and Gene & Georgetti's came into a legal struggle in 1995. Opening Erie Cafe E.J. and Toni referred to their family ties to E.J.'s grandfather Michelotti. As they actively referred to Gene & Georgetti's, without the latter's consent, Gene & Georgetti's filed a lawsuit. G&G claimed that the opening invitation and other advertisement violated the Lanham Trademark Act.

The case came before United States District Court for the Northern District of Illinois judge Elaine E. Bucklo. Judge Bucklo ruled that the Lanham Trademark Act was in place to protect customers against, for example, confusing advertisements. As the plaintiff did not bring forward any evidence proving any confusion caused, the judge ruled in favor of Erie Cafe.

== Motorsports results ==
=== SCCA National Championship Runoffs ===
Year	Track	Car	Engine	Class	Finish	Start	Status
1984	Road Atlanta	Swift DB1	Ford	Formula Ford	15	21	Running
1985	Road Atlanta	Swift DB1	Ford	Formula Ford	14	15	Running

=== American Open-Wheel racing results ===
(key) (Races in bold indicate pole position, races in italics indicate fastest race lap)

==== Formula Super Vee ====
Year	Team	1	2	3	4	5	6	7	8	9	10	11	12	13	Rank	Points
1988	Turtle Wax / Baci Racing	PHX; 4	LBH; Ret	DAL; 3	**IRP**; 2	MIL; 2	DET; 2	NIA; 6	CLE; 7	MEA; 2	MOH; 2	ROA; 4	NAZ; 3	STP; 4	**2nd**	**163**

==== Atlantic Championship - East Coast ====
Year	Team	1	2	3	4	5	6	7	8	9	10	11	12	Rank	Points
1989	Baci Racing	LBH; 12	LRP; 11	MOH; 15	MTL; 16	MOS	WGI; 3	MOH; 12	TOP	TRO	ROA	TOP	STP	17th	31

==== American Racing Series ====
Year	Team	1	2	3	4	5	6	7	8	9	10	11	12	13	14	Rank	Points
1990	Baci Racing	PHX	LBH; 22	MIL	DET	POR	CLE	MEA	TOR	DEN	VAN	MOH	ROA; 11	NAZ; 11	LS	28th	4

==== Atlantic Championship ====
Year	Team	1	2	3	4	5	6	7	8	9	10	11	12	13	14	Rank	Points
1992	Baci Racing	MIA	PIR; DNS	LBH	LRP	MTL	WGI	TOR	TRR	VAN	MOH	MOS	NAZ	LS1	LS2	-	-
