= 1991 CART PPG Indy Car World Series =

American motorsport season

1991 CART season
- PPG Indy Car World Series
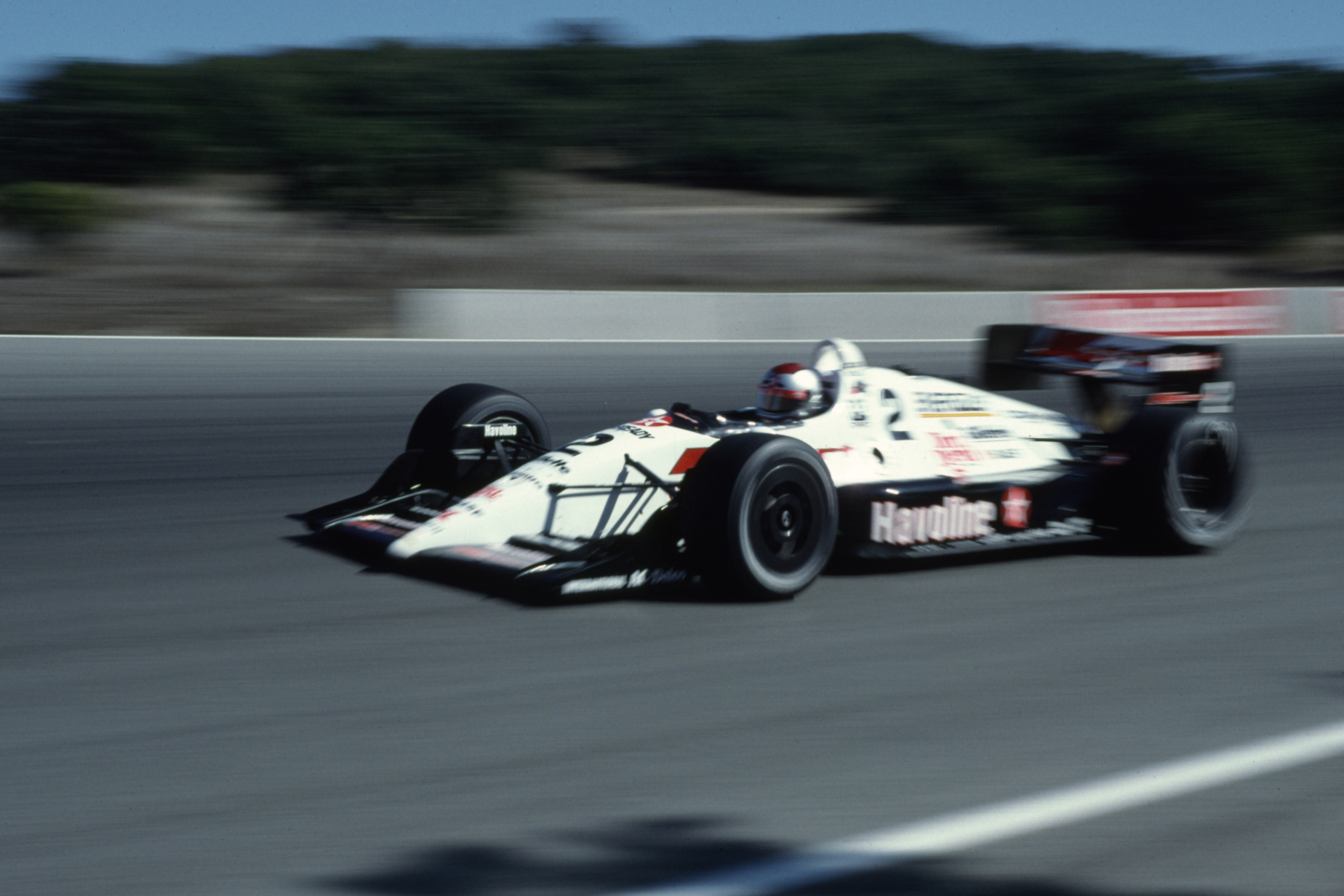
- Michael Andretti

Season
- Races: 18
- Start date: March 17
- End date: October 20

Awards
- Drivers' champion: (United States) Michael Andretti
- Constructors' Cup: (United Kingdom) Lola
- Manufacturers' Cup: (United States) Chevrolet
- Rookie of the Year: (United States) Jeff Andretti
- Indianapolis 500 winner: (United States) Rick Mears

The 1991 CART PPG Indy Car World Series season was the 13th national championship season of American open wheel racing sanctioned by CART. The season consisted of 17 races, and one non-points exhibition event. Michael Andretti was the national champion, and the rookie of the year was his younger brother Jeff Andretti.

The 1991 Indianapolis 500 was sanctioned by USAC, but counted towards the CART points championship. Rick Mears won the Indy 500, his record-tying fourth victory in the event.

Michael Andretti won a total of eight races, eight pole positions, and led more than half of the laps during the season, but the championship battle still went down to the final race of the season. Bobby Rahal won only one race, but had 11 podium finishes and 13 top tens. Rahal's consistent season put him in position to challenge Andretti for the title in the season finale at Laguna Seca. Andretti got off to a slow start to the season, dropping out of the first two races, and finished a heartbreaking second at Indianapolis. But after Indy, he shot to the top of the standings. He won four of the last five races of the season, and needed to finish 6th or better at Laguna Seca to clinch the title. When Bobby Rahal dropped out at Laguna Seca with overheating problems, Andretti cruised to the title.

== Drivers and constructors ==
The following teams and drivers competed for the 1991 Indy Car World Series. All entrants used Goodyear tires.

Team	Chassis	Engine	No.	Driver(s)	Status	Round(s)	Ref(s)
Arciero Racing	Penske PC-17	Buick	12	(United States) Mark Dismore	R	1–4 (Note: Practiced for round 4, but withdrew from the event due to multiple leg injuries.)	
Arciero Racing	Lola T89/00	Buick	12	(United States) Pancho Carter		4–5	
Arciero Racing	Lola T89/00	Buick	12	(United States) Jeff Wood		6–7	
Arciero Racing	Lola T89/00	Buick	12	(Canada) John Jones		8–17	
A. J. Foyt Enterprises	Lola T91/00	Chevrolet	14	(Mexico) Bernard Jourdain		2	
A. J. Foyt Enterprises	Lola T91/00	Chevrolet	14	(United States) Al Unser		3	
A. J. Foyt Enterprises	Lola T91/00	Chevrolet	14	(United States) A. J. Foyt		4–9, 11, 16	
A. J. Foyt Enterprises	Lola T91/00	Chevrolet	14	(United States) Mike Groff		10, 12, 14–15, 17	
A. J. Foyt Enterprises	Lola T90/00	Buick	48	(Mexico) Bernard Jourdain		4	
Bayside Motorsports	Lola T91/00	Cosworth	86	(United States) Jeff Andretti	R	All	
Bettenhausen Motorsports	Penske PC-19	Chevrolet	16	(United States) Tony Bettenhausen Jr.		All	
Chip Ganassi Racing	Lola T91/00	Chevrolet	8	(United States) Eddie Cheever		All	
Dale Coyne Racing; Nu-Tech Racing; Hemelgarn Coyne Racing; Dale Coyne / Bettenhausen	Lola T90/00	Cosworth	19	(United States) Randy Lewis		1–4, 9–12, 14–15, 17	
Dale Coyne Racing; Nu-Tech Racing; Hemelgarn Coyne Racing; Dale Coyne / Bettenhausen	Lola T90/00	Cosworth	19	(United States) Dale Coyne		5, 7	
Dale Coyne Racing; Nu-Tech Racing; Hemelgarn Coyne Racing; Dale Coyne / Bettenhausen	Lola T90/00	Cosworth	19	(United States) Buddy Lazier		8 (Note: Various car owners established partnerships with teams that owned CART franchises by running entries on their behalf, which were entitled to a set amount of money per car entered.: Dale Coyne Racing entered a Hemelgarn Racing-run car for Buddy Lazier as: No. 19 in Round 8; No. 39 in Rounds 10, 12 and 17; No. 90 in Rounds 6 and 15; Walker Motorsports entered a Hemelgarn Racing-run car for Buddy Lazier as No. 10 in Round 14.; Dale Coyne Racing entered a Nu-Tech Motorsports-run car for Dennis Vitolo as: No. 39 in Rounds 1 and 6; No. 90 in Round 2; Dale Coyne Racing entered a Bettenhausen Motorsports-run car for Cor Euser as No. 90 in Round 17.)	
Dale Coyne Racing; Nu-Tech Racing; Hemelgarn Coyne Racing; Dale Coyne / Bettenhausen	Lola T90/00	Cosworth	19	(Canada) Ross Bentley	R	13	
Dale Coyne Racing; Nu-Tech Racing; Hemelgarn Coyne Racing; Dale Coyne / Bettenhausen	Lola T90/00	Cosworth	19	(United States) Dennis Vitolo	R	16	
Dale Coyne Racing; Nu-Tech Racing; Hemelgarn Coyne Racing; Dale Coyne / Bettenhausen	Lola T89/00	Cosworth	39	(United States) Dennis Vitolo	R	1, 6	
Dale Coyne Racing; Nu-Tech Racing; Hemelgarn Coyne Racing; Dale Coyne / Bettenhausen	Lola T90/00	Cosworth	39	(Canada) Paul Tracy	R	2	
Dale Coyne Racing; Nu-Tech Racing; Hemelgarn Coyne Racing; Dale Coyne / Bettenhausen	Lola T90/00	Cosworth	39	(United States) Jeff Wood		3	
Dale Coyne Racing; Nu-Tech Racing; Hemelgarn Coyne Racing; Dale Coyne / Bettenhausen	Lola T90/00	Cosworth	39	(United States) Buddy Lazier		10, 12, 17	
Dale Coyne Racing; Nu-Tech Racing; Hemelgarn Coyne Racing; Dale Coyne / Bettenhausen	Lola T90/00	Cosworth	39	(United States) Michael Greenfield		14–15	
Dale Coyne Racing; Nu-Tech Racing; Hemelgarn Coyne Racing; Dale Coyne / Bettenhausen	Lola T88/00	Cosworth	90	(United States) Buddy Lazier		1	
Dale Coyne Racing; Nu-Tech Racing; Hemelgarn Coyne Racing; Dale Coyne / Bettenhausen	Lola T90/00	Cosworth	90	(United States) Buddy Lazier		6, 15	
Dale Coyne Racing; Nu-Tech Racing; Hemelgarn Coyne Racing; Dale Coyne / Bettenhausen	Lola T89/00	Cosworth	90	(United States) Dennis Vitolo	R	2	
Dale Coyne Racing; Nu-Tech Racing; Hemelgarn Coyne Racing; Dale Coyne / Bettenhausen	Penske PC-19	Chevrolet	90	(Netherlands) Cor Euser	R	17	
D. B. Mann Motorsports	Lola T90/00	Buick	93	(United States) John Paul Jr.		4	
Dick Simon Racing	Lola T90/00 (Note: Used by Matsushita at rounds 1, 3, 6 and 7, and by Palmroth.); Lola T91/00	Cosworth	7	(Japan) Hiro Matsushita		1–3, 5–16	
Dick Simon Racing	Lola T90/00; Lola T91/00	Buick	7	(Japan) Hiro Matsushita		4	
Dick Simon Racing	Lola T90/00; Lola T91/00	Chevrolet	7	(Japan) Hiro Matsushita		17	
Dick Simon Racing	Lola T90/00; Lola T91/00	Chevrolet	22	(United States) Scott Brayton		All	
Paragon Motorsports	Lola T90/00; Lola T91/00	Cosworth	23	(Finland) Tero Palmroth		4	
Euromotorsport Racing	Lola T90/00	Cosworth	42	(Italy) Franco Scapini	R	1	
Euromotorsport Racing	Lola T90/00	Cosworth	42	(Belgium) Didier Theys		4	
Euromotorsport Racing	Lola T90/00	Cosworth	42	(Italy) Tony de Tommaso	R	12	
Euromotorsport Racing	Lola T90/00	Cosworth	42	(Italy) Nicola Marozzo	R	13–15	
Euromotorsport Racing	Lola T90/00	Cosworth	50	(United States) Mike Groff		1–3	
Euromotorsport Racing	Lola T91/00	Cosworth	50	(United States) Mike Groff		4–9	
Euromotorsport Racing	Lola T90/00	Cosworth	50	(Colombia) Roberto Guerrero		10	
Euromotorsport Racing	Lola T91/00	Cosworth	50	(United States) Jeff Wood		12–17	
Galles-Kraco Racing	Lola T91/00	Chevrolet	1	(United States) Al Unser Jr.		All	
Galles-Kraco Racing	Lola T91/00	Chevrolet	18	(United States) Bobby Rahal		All	
Genoa Racing	Lola T90/00	Cosworth	33	(Italy) Guido Daccò		2–4, 6–7	
Hall-VDS Racing	Lola T91/00	Chevrolet	4	(United States) John Andretti		All	
Hemelgarn Racing	Lola T90/00	Buick	71	(United States) Buddy Lazier		4	
Hemelgarn Racing	Lola T90/00	Buick	92	(United States) Gordon Johncock		4	
Hemelgarn-Byrd Racing	Lola T91/00	Buick	91	(United States) Stan Fox		4	
Kent Baker Racing	Lola T89/00	Buick	97	(United States) Dean Hall		4	
King Motorsports	Lola T91/00	Buick	26	(United Kingdom) Jim Crawford		4	
King Motorsports	Lola T91/00	Buick	26	(Colombia) Roberto Guerrero		6, 12, 17	
Leader Card Racing	Lola T90/00	Cosworth	21	(United States) Dean Hall		1	
Leader Card Racing	Lola T90/00	Cosworth	21	(Belgium) Didier Theys		2, 6–10, 12, 14–15, 17	
Leader Card Racing	Lola T90/00	Cosworth	21	(United States) Pancho Carter		4, 11 (Note: Practiced for round 4, but changed teams to Arciero Racing to replace the injured Mark Dismore.)	
Leader Card Racing	Lola T90/00	Cosworth	21	(United States) Johnny Parsons		4–5	
Menard Racing	Lola T91/00	Buick	9	(United States) Kevin Cogan		4	
Menard Racing	Lola T91/00	Buick	51	(United States) Gary Bettenhausen		4	
Menard Racing	Lola T89/00	Buick	59	(United States) Tom Sneva		4	
Newman/Haas Racing	Lola T91/00	Chevrolet	2	(United States) Michael Andretti		All	
Newman/Haas Racing	Lola T91/00	Chevrolet	6	(United States) Mario Andretti		All	
Patrick Racing	Lola T91/00	Alfa Romeo	20	(United States) Danny Sullivan		All	
Patrick Racing	Lola T91/00	Alfa Romeo	40	(Colombia) Roberto Guerrero		4	
Penske Racing	Penske PC-20	Chevrolet	3	(United States) Rick Mears		All	
Penske Racing	Penske PC-20	Chevrolet	5	(Brazil) Emerson Fittipaldi		All	
Penske Racing	Penske PC-19	Chevrolet	17	(Canada) Paul Tracy	R	11, 16–17	
P.I.G. Entreprises	Lola T89/00	Judd	31	(United States) Ted Prappas	R	1–2, 4	
P.I.G. Entreprises	Lola T91/00	Judd	31	(United States) Ted Prappas	R	6–10, 12–15, 17	
Thom Burns Racing	Lola T89/00	Judd	66	(United States) Dominic Dobson		4	
Todd Walther Racing	Lola T89/00	Cosworth	44	(United States) Phil Krueger		1–2 (Note: Practiced for round 2, but was replaced before qualifying.)	
Todd Walther Racing	Lola T89/00	Cosworth	44	(United States) Buddy Lazier		2	
Truesports	Truesports 91C	Judd	11	(United States) Scott Pruett		All	
Truesports	Truesports 91C	Judd	21	(Australia) Geoff Brabham		4	
UNO Racing	Lola T91/00	Judd	15	(Canada) Scott Goodyear		All	
Vince Granatelli Racing	Lola T91/00	Chevrolet	9	(Netherlands) Arie Luyendyk		All	
Walker Motorsport	Lola T90/00	Buick	10	(United States) Willy T. Ribbs		4	
Walker Motorsport	Lola T90/00	Cosworth	10	(United States) Willy T. Ribbs		6, 8–9, 12–13, 15–17	
Walker Motorsport	Lola T90/00	Cosworth	10	(United States) Jon Beekhuis		11	
Walker Motorsport	Lola T90/00	Cosworth	10	(United States) Buddy Lazier		14	
Walther Motorsports	Penske PC-18	Cosworth	77	(United States) Salt Walther		4	

=== Driver changes ===
==== Preseason ====
- On August 6, 1990, Bettenhausen Motorsports confirmed its plans for a full 1991 campaign with driver/owner Tony Bettenhausen Jr. in the No. 16 car.
- On September 18, 1990, Penske Racing announced it would downsize its program back to a two-car team for 1991 by not exercising their option on Danny Sullivan, as sponsorship from Pennzoil had switched to Hall/VDS Racing.
- On October 8, 1990, Hall/VDS Racing announced it had signed John Andretti as their lone driver in a two-year deal. Andretti switched to the No. 4 car from Porsche North America after the German manufacturer stopped its Indy Car program.
- On October 12, 1990, King Motorsports announced the signing of Jim Crawford for its partial schedule in the No. 26 car, including the Indianapolis 500.
- On October 30, 1990, Patrick Racing announced that Danny Sullivan had signed to drive the No. 20 car in 1991, replacing Roberto Guerrero.
- On November 3, 1990, Bayside Racing signed Jeff Andretti as its new driver for the No. 86 car, replacing Dominic Dobson.
- On November 20, 1990, A. J. Foyt announced his plans to retire from competition after the 1991 season, during his recovery from the leg and feet injuries sustained on September 23, 1990, in a crash at Road America. Foyt, who had dismissed the notion of retirement in early press conferences after his crash, clarified it had been his plan all along. However, he remained non-committal for the rest of 1991 regarding his future plans.
- On December 14, 1990, Scott Pruett received the mandatory medical approval to return to the No. 11 Truesports car for 1991. Pruett had been sidelined for the whole 1990 season due to severe leg injuries in a pre-season crash, with Raul Boesel as the fill-in driver throughout the year.
- On January 8, 1991, Menard Racing announced that Kevin Cogan and Gary Bettenhausen would drive its two Buick-powered Lola T91/00 cars at the Indianapolis 500, entered as No. 9 and No. 51. Bettenhausen had driven a year-old Lola with Menard in the previous edition.
- On February 8, 1991, the Indianapolis News reported that Euromotorsport had signed John Jones to drive the No. 50 car, taking the place of Mike Groff. However, the necessary funding for the seat did not materialize, and Jones was replaced for the Surfers Paradise round by the returning Groff, who would remain in the car as the full-time driver.
- On January 30, 1991, Arciero Racing announced the signing of rookie Mark Dismore, who replaced Randy Lewis in the No. 12 car. Dismore was the reigning champion of the Atlantic Championship in the discontinued Pacific Division, and had made one previous Indy Car start in 1989.
- In February 1991, Dale Coyne Racing signed Randy Lewis to drive the No. 19 car in 1991, replacing Dean Hall.
- On February 5, 1991, P.I.G. Enterprises announced that rookie Ted Prappas would drive the No. 31 car, replacing Jon Beekhuis. Prappas had finished second in the American Racing Series standings with one win, behind series champion Paul Tracy. Due to the team's low budget for the season, Prappas skipped all oval races except for the Indianapolis 500, where he failed to qualify after crashing twice. Subsequently, his equipment was upgraded from a Lola T89/00 to a T91/00.
- On February 8, 1991, Dick Simon Racing announced that Hiro Matsushita would be the full-time driver of the No. 7 car, after a partial schedule in his debut season. Matsushita's car was powered by a Cosworth engine, except for his first serious attempt at the Indianapolis 500, which was planned with a Buick stock-block. For the final race of the season at Laguna Seca, Matsushita drove a Chevrolet engine, in anticipation of his supplier switch for 1992.
- On February 14, 1991, Hemelgarn Racing announced the signing of Stan Fox in the No. 91 car for the Indianapolis 500, as part of a new partnership with Jonathan Byrd Racing. Fox was tasked with a Lola T91/00 chassis, the first brand-new car of his Indy Car career. Both team owners had lost their Indy 500 drivers over the previous year, after Rich Vogler and Billy Vukovich III were both killed in separate sprint car races; Vukovich had been due to sign for the joint venture at the time of his death.
- On February 16, 1991, A. J. Foyt Enterprises announced that the team would skip the opening race of the season at Surfers Paradise, and that Bernard Jourdain would drive the No. 14 car at Long Beach in place of the injured A. J. Foyt, who aimed to return at Phoenix. This marked Jourdain's own return since rupturing his spleen in a practice crash at Indianapolis in 1990.
- On February 19, 1991, Dale Coyne Racing announced it had signed the reigning American Racing Series champion Paul Tracy to drive for the team for an undetermined number of races, starting at Long Beach in the No. 39 car. Tracy had previously signed a three-month testing deal with Truesports in October 1990 that failed to evolve into a ride due to a lack of sponsorship.
- On February 27, 1991, Todd Walther Racing announced that Phil Krueger would drive the No. 44 car full-time from Long Beach onwards, replacing Jeff Wood. However, he was later entered for the Surfers Paradise season opener as well.
- On March 4, 1991, Genoa Racing announced that Guido Daccò would drive the No. 33 full-time from Long Beach onwards.
- On March 13, 1991, A. J. Foyt Enterprises entered Bernard Jourdain for the Indianapolis 500 as the driver of the No. 48 car. Jourdain drove a Buickengine, the first and only time in history that a Foyt car carried such powerplant in Indy car racing.
- The following drivers were entered for the Surfers Paradise race and other events without a prior announcement
  - Euromotorsport Racing entered rookie Franco Scapini in the No. 42 car. Scapini was a former International Formula 3000 driver that served as a Formula 1 test driver for the Life F1 team in 1990, and had one previous start in the American Racing Series in 1988. He was featured in The Indianapolis Star as a full-time entrant, and was entered for the events at Long Beach and Phoenix, but failed to appear at either race, and the Indianapolis News reported on April 23 that he had been demoted due to non-payments from his sponsors. In a 2025 interview, Scapini claimed that a steep asking price from Euromotorsport prevented him from continuing.
  - Dale Coyne Racing entered Buddy Lazier in the No. 90 car, with an older Lola T88/00 chassis, and Dennis Vitolo in the car serviced by Nu-Tech Motorsports. Vitolo, who had raced once in 1988 and failed to qualify for two events in 1989, also started under this arrangement at Long Beach and Detroit.
  - Leader Card Motorsports signed one-race deals with Dean Hall and Didier Theys to drive the No. 21 car at Surfers Paradise and Long Beach, respectively. The team later sat out Phoenix in order to preserve its lone chassis for the Indianapolis 500.

==== Mid-season ====
- During March and April, a number of drivers were entered for the Indianapolis 500 without a prior announcement
  - On March 21, 1991, Truesports entered Geoff Brabham in the No. 21 car for the Indianapolis 500, also rekindling the association from the 1990 edition.
  - On March 27, 1991, Genoa Racing entered Vinicio Salmi in a second car for the Indianapolis 500. However, Salmi never turned a wheel in rookie orientation or official practice, due to Genoa's economic issues.
  - On April 2, 1991, Hemelgarn Racing entered Buddy Lazier in the No. 71 car for a second attempt at his first Indianapolis 500, driving a newly rebuilt Lola T90/00.
  - On April 3, 1991, Walther Motorsports entered Salt Walther as the driver of the No. 77 car, again in a two-year-old Penske model.
- On April 3, 1991, Hemelgarn Racing announced that rookie Davey Hamilton would complete its line-up for the Indianapolis 500 in the No. 81 Lola T88/00-Buick. Hamilton, a Supermodified standout from the West Coast, attempted to gather funding for a T90/00 model.
- On April 4, 1991, D. B. Mann Motorsports announced John Paul Jr. as the driver of the No. 93 car for the Indianapolis 500, reprising his role from the 1990 edition.
- On April 12, 1991, during the Long Beach Grand Prix weekend, Todd Walther Racing replaced Phil Krueger with Buddy Lazier in the No. 44 car, after Krueger struggled to register a time during the first practice session.
- On April 16, 1991, A. J. Foyt announced that he would not compete at Phoenix to further heal from his injuries before the Indianapolis 500. Fellow four-time Indy 500 winner Al Unser was selected to drive the No. 14 car, racing on a one-mile oval for the first time since 1987, and five years after his last Phoenix race.
- On April 19, 1991, Kent Baker Racing announced Dean Hall as the driver of the No. 97 entry for the Indianapolis 500.
- On April 20, 1991, Dale Coyne Racing entered Jeff Wood to start the No. 19 for the Phoenix despite not taking part in qualifying, as a 'last-minute substitute' for Paul Tracy. An engine failure in his debut race at Long Beach prevented the low-funded Tracy from executing his plan to keep his schedule alive on purse earnings.
- On April 24, 1991, Walker Motorsports announced it would compete in the Indianapolis 500 with Willy T. Ribbs as the driver of the No. 17 Lola car, with a chance of running more races if sufficient funding was found. This signified Ribbs' return to Indianapolis after his aborted 1985 attempt, looking to become the first African American driver to race at the Indy 500.
- On April 29, 1991, Dale Coyne Racing announced that Paul Tracy would not attempt to compete at the Indianapolis 500 due to a lack of sponsorship, hoping to restart the program at Detroit. His seat would not be taken for the Indy 500, after Randy Lewis crashed his primary car during practice.
- On May 1, 1991, Thom Burns Racing entered two-time Indianapolis 500 winner Gordon Johncock as the driver of the No. 66 car for the Indy 500. Three days later, before official practice for the race began, Johncock was replaced by Dominic Dobson due to the loss of his sponsorship package.
- On May 1, 1991, Leader Card Motorsports entered Pancho Carter for the Indianapolis 500, in a car renumbered as No. 11. Carter had been the lead driver for Leader Card from 1989 until halfway through 1990.
- On May 3, 1991, Dick Simon Racing entered Tero Palmroth for the third time in four years. The No. 23, the third car of the team, was entered by Paragon Motorsports, a new subsidiary of Simon's team that had technical support from TEAMKAR International in its first year. During the month, Paragon also became co-entrant of Hiro Matsushita's car for the rest of the season.
- During the weeks of practice for the Indianapolis 500, the following driver assignments or changes occurred:
  - On May 10, 1991, Mark Dismore suffered season-ending leg injuries in a massive practice crash. His Penske PC-17, who collided with the attenuator at pit lane entry, was destroyed on impact. On May 13, Arciero Racing officially named Pancho Carter, who switched from his ride at Leader Card Motorsports, to drive the No. 12 car, which was now a Lola T89/00 acquired from Bettenhausen Motorsports. In Carter's place, the No. 11 entry at Leader Card was assigned the same day to his half-brother Johnny Parsons, another Indy 500 veteran. Both Carter and Parsons remained in the cars for the following event at Milwaukee.
  - On May 13, 1991, Euromotorsport announced Didier Theys as the driver of the No. 50T car, which was to be renumbered as No. 42 had it qualified for the race. A day earlier, Theys had been shaking down the No. 17 Walker car as a stand-in for Willy T. Ribbs, who couldn't practice during a qualifying weekend without passing his rookie test.
  - On May 14, 1991, Hemelgarn Racing announced that Gordon Johncock would take over the third entry for the team, replacing Davey Hamilton. Johncock was assigned to the No. 92 Lola T90/00-Cosworth, the spare car for Stan Fox, after Hamilton crashed his Lola T88/00-Buick in April during Rookie Orientation, having been unable to secure funding to take part in official practice.
  - On May 15, 1991, Patrick Racing announced that Roberto Guerrero had rejoined the team as the driver of the No. 40 car for the Indianapolis 500. Guerrero indicated that expanding his schedule with Patrick for two more races was a possibility, but it fizzled out after he crashed during the race.
  - On May 17, 1991, Menard Racing announced it would field its third car, to be driven by Tom Sneva, the 1983 Indianapolis 500 winner. The car was a 1989 Lola reserved for pit stop practice, entered as the No. 59. Other notable Indy 500 winners, such as Al Unser and Johnny Rutherford, failed to find a seat for the month.
- On May 31, 1991, Dale Coyne Racing announced that Randy Lewis would miss the Milwaukee race. Team owner Dale Coyne came out of retirement to start the No. 19 car, planning to have Paul Tracy at Detroit and Lewis back in the cockpit at Portland, but Tracy withdrew his program a day later to join Penske Racing as a test driver. Coyne remained entered at Detroit before being scratched, as the team already had Buddy Lazier and Dennis Vitolo in its shared entries with other teams. On June 17 it was announced that Lewis would return to the cockpit at the Meadowlands, being replaced again by Dale Coyne at Portland and by Buddy Lazier at Cleveland, who was entered by Hemelgarn Coyne Racing.
- In the lead-up to the Detroit Grand Prix, a number of rides were assigned without an official announcement reported in press sources at the time
  - Arciero Racing fielded Jeff Wood, who would remain in the No. 12 car at Portland.
  - Dale Coyne Racing entered Buddy Lazier under their Hemelgarn Coyne Racing partnership. Lazier was also entered in five other races with this program, which included driving the primary No. 19 entry at the Grand Prix of Cleveland after Paul Tracy vacated his planned part-time schedule with the team.
  - Leader Card Racing entered Didier Theys, who would drive all of the remaining road course races in the No. 21 car, except for Vancouver.
- On June 11, 1991, Walker Motorsports announced it would race the No. 10 car at the Detroit Grand Prix with Willy T. Ribbs, in an out-of-pocket venture without sponsorship. The team switched back to a Cosworth engine, after multiple failures on the Buick units during the Indy 500 month. On June 27, the program was expanded to the races at Cleveland and the Meadowlands.
- On June 13, 1991, King Motorsports announced that Roberto Guerrero would drive the No. 26 car at Detroit, and potentially later in the year at Denver and Laguna Seca, which did happen in both events. Guerrero effectively inherited the part-time schedule that had been initially announced for Jim Crawford, who declined after feeling uncomfortable in a test due to previous feet injuries.
- On July 3, 1991, Arciero Racing announced that John Jones had signed a three-race deal to drive the No. 12 car at Cleveland, the Meadowlands and Toronto. Jones returned to Indy Car racing after a year in the International Formula 3000, finishing 12th in his third stint in the series. On July 21, during the Toronto weekend, it was announced that the deal was extended to the Michigan 500, where Jones confirmed he would remain in the seat for the rest of the year.
- On July 15, 1991, Penske Racing announced that test driver Paul Tracy would drive the No. 17 entry, a third car with a PC-19 chassis, at the Michigan 500, after impressing in a test session with the team.
- On July 17, 1991, A. J. Foyt Enterprises announced that Mike Groff would take over the No. 14 car for the remaining six road course and street races of the schedule, starting at Toronto. Driver/owner A. J. Foyt, who had already interviewed various candidates during the Meadowlands weekend, argued his feet were giving him too much trouble on the road courses, and reduced his own program to the final two oval races at Michigan and Nazareth. Groff switched over from Euromotorsports, which replaced him with Roberto Guerrero for the Toronto race.
- On July 29, 1991, Walker Motorsports announced it would race the No. 10 car at the Michigan 500 with Jon Beekhuis, instead of its regular driver Willy T. Ribbs. Walker claimed that Ribbs had a conflict with his IMSA contract with All American Racers as a back-up driver that prevented him from racing at Michigan, while Ribbs blamed his absence on the lack of sponsorship.
- On August 1, 1991, Leader Card Racing entered Pancho Carter for the Michigan 500, rekindling the failed Indianapolis 500 association.
- In August and September, Euromotorsport Racing fielded the No. 42 car at four events for two Italian newcomers. Tony de Tommaso, an Italian Formula 2000 race winner who had failed to qualify for International Formula 3000 events, took over the car at Denver, while Nicola Marozzo, who had last raced a privateer Lancia LC2 in the World Sportscar Championship in 1988, drove at Vancouver, Mid-Ohio and Road America.
- On August 13, 1991, Dale Coyne Racing announced that Ross Bentley would race the No. 19 car at his home track of Vancouver, with Randy Lewis stepping down for this event over the funded effort. Bentley's lone Indy Car start came at Vancouver a year before.
- On August 15, 1991, Walker Motorsports announced that Willy T. Ribbs would be back in the No. 10 car for the races at Denver and Vancouver after purchasing a new chassis, following the destruction of the previous model at Michigan. On September 11, 1991, team owner Derrick Walker confirmed that the team had secured enough funding to compete in the final three races of the season. Although Walker Motorsport announced it would miss Mid-Ohio after their primary car was crashed at Vancouver, they eventually entered the race on behalf of Hemelgarn Racing, with Buddy Lazier as the driver.
- On August 22, 1991, Penske Racing announced that Paul Tracy would return to the No. 17 car in the final two events of the season at Nazareth and Laguna Seca, once healed from injuries sustained at the Michigan 500.
- On August 27, 1991, Euromotorsport Racing announced that Jeff Wood would drive the No. 50 car from Vancouver until the end of the season, two days after filling in at Denver.
- Over the final four races of the season, Dale Coyne Racing entered several drivers to complete its lineup once again. Michael Greenfield drove the No. 39 car at Mid-Ohio and Road America; Dennis Vitolo took the No. 19 car at Nazareth, with Randy Lewis again sitting out, and Dutch driver Cor Euser drove the No. 90 at Laguna Seca, in a Penske PC-19-Chevrolet that was entered for, and serviced by, Bettenhausen Motorsports. Euser, who had last driven an open-wheel car in 1989, had enjoyed moderate success in the World Sportscar Championship, and was a regular competitor in the Deutsche Tourenwagen Meisterschaft that year.

=== Team changes ===
==== 1990 and preseason ====
- On April 20, 1990, Truesports announced plans to build its own chassis for the 1991 season. The Truesports 91C, which began its design phase in 1989, was built in the team's shops in Hillard, Ohio. It was powered by a custom Judd engine developed in-house with American parts, with the goal of designing an 'All-American car'.
- On July 21, 1990, Chaparral founder and former driver Jim Hall announced his return to team ownership in Indy Car with support from engine builders VDS Racing. This led to the formation of Hall/VDS Racing, which would use Lola chassis.
- On August 6, 1990, Chevrolet announced that it would expand its engine program to supply Bettenhausen Motorsports, Dick Simon Racing and Hall/VDS Racing in 1991.
- On August 11, 1990, King Motorsports announced its return to the Indianapolis 500, as well as selected events, after missing the 1990 season. The team took over the development contract for the Buick engines that had been previously assigned to Vince Granatelli Racing, with custom-built Lola T91/00 chassis as part of the deal.
- On September 15, 1990, former team manager Roy Winkleman announced the formation of a new team with John Paul Jr. as a driver and a Lola T91/00-Cosworth combination, provided that enough sponsorship was procured. However, the effort did not materialize.
- On September 18, 1990, Porsche North America announced it would discontinue its involvement in Indy Car competition at the end of the 1990 season, in order to concentrate resources on its new Formula 1 program with Footwork Arrows. Team manager Derrick Walker bought Porsche's Indy Car assets and race shop and, on November 27, 1990, announced the formation of Walker Motorsport, using a Lola chassis with Kevin Cogan as the driver. However, just three days later, Walker put the program on hold due to the lack of promised funding from his partner Jim Gillespie. A subsequent search for funding eventually resulted in a partial schedule for 1991. The team used a Cosworth engine, except at the Indianapolis 500, where it changed to a Buick during the first week of practice for cost reasons. The choice of a Lola chassis signified the end of the line for March Engineering as a chassis supplier in Indy Car racing.
- In October 1990, Bettenhausen Motorsports secured the use of Penske PC-19 chassis, having previously raced with Lola chassis.
- On January 10, 1991, Vince Granatelli Racing and Doug Shierson Racing, which had been bought out by Bob Tezak from team founder Doug Shierson, announced a merger for the 1991 season, with Tezak's team being integrated into the Granatelli organization. Resources and employees were transferred to Granatelli's headquarters in Phoenix, Arizona, as well as the Uno sponsorship and the Lola-Chevrolet package. Shierson's subsidiary entry, fielded by O'Donnell Racing, became an independent team under direct ownership from Tezak. It was renamed as UNO Racing and moved from Indianapolis, inheriting Shierson's former headquarters in Adrian, Michigan.
- During the off-season, a number of part-time or Indy 500-only teams closed their operations, most notably Gohr Racing, who had raced in CART since 1981. Stoops Racing sold off its equipment after their main sponsorship moved to Team Menard with Kevin Cogan, while Greenfield Engineering and Andale Racing did not continue after extensive damage to their limited equipment during 1990. Both driver/owners Michael Greenfield and Bernard Jourdain continued their careers elsewhere.
- On March 4, 1991, Genoa Racing announced it would enter the Indy Car World Series as a full-time, one-car effort starting at the Long Beach Grand Prix, with a Lola T90/00-Cosworth combination and a potential second car at selected events. At the time, Genoa also raced in the Atlantic Championship and BCRA Midgets, having previously featured in Can-Am and Formula 3000.
- On March 7, 1991, the Raynor/Cosby Racing Team closed its operations after five seasons in CART due to the lack of sponsorship. The team had previously been disbanded and had hoped to find sponsorship, to no avail.
- Dale Coyne Racing and Nu-Tech Motorsports, owned by Gino Gagliano, entered into a partnership for the 1991 season, with Coyne entering a car serviced by the Nu-Tech crew on a part-time basis, either as the No. 39 or the No. 90 depending on the number of cars entered by the team. This was done in order for both teams to benefit from the purse earnings obtained by Coyne from using their second CART franchise.

==== Mid-season ====
- On April 19, 1991, it was reported that Todd Walther Racing had been disbanded, after just two races in their second CART season.
- From June onwards, Hemelgarn Racing partnered with Dale Coyne Racing to field a car in a variety of races for Buddy Lazier, with the same strategy employed by Nu-Tech to share franchising earnings. The partnership was known as Hemelgarn Coyne Racing.
- On June 21, 1991, Bob Tezak warned that Vince Granatelli Racing risked shutting down for the season due to a lack of sponsorship, despite Arie Luyendyk running third in the standings at the time. The next week, Granatelli severed ties with Tezak, who was blamed by Luyendyk of mismanagement and failure to pay his salary, and the team scrambled to find funding to compete on a race-by-race basis.
- After the June 23, 1991, race at Portland, Genoa Racing discontinued its short-lived Indy Car program. The team had suffered from economic woes due to the crash of Guido Daccò at Phoenix, the loss of major sponsorship during the Month of May and the subsequent withdrawal from the Indianapolis 500, also skipping the following event at Milwaukee.
- In August 1991, Euromotorsport skipped the Michigan 500 entirely, due to an alleged engine testing session. The team had both their primary and spare cars damaged to various degrees during the previous Toronto event.
- On August 27, 1991, A. J. Foyt Enterprises announced they would skip the race at Vancouver due to a lack of a spare car. One week earlier, the team had not been allowed to race at Denver after Mike Groff wrote off his primary car in a practice crash, as the spare car had not been entered.

== Schedule ==
Icon	Legend
O	Oval/Speedway
R	Road course
S	Street circuit
NC	Non-championship race

Rd.	Date	Race Name	Track	Location
1	March 17	Gold Coast IndyCar Grand Prix	S Surfers Paradise Street Circuit	Surfers Paradise, Australia
2	April 14	Toyota Grand Prix of Long Beach	S Long Beach Street Circuit	Long Beach, California
3	April 21	Valvoline 200	O Phoenix International Raceway	Phoenix, Arizona
4	May 26	Indianapolis 500	O Indianapolis Motor Speedway	Speedway, Indiana
5	June 2	Miller Genuine Draft 200	O Milwaukee Mile	West Allis, Wisconsin
6	June 16	Valvoline Detroit Grand Prix	S Detroit Street Circuit	Detroit, Michigan
7	June 23	Budweiser/G. I.Joe's 200	R Portland International Raceway	Portland, Oregon
8	July 8	Budweiser Cleveland Grand Prix	R Burke Lakefront Airport	Cleveland, Ohio
9	July 14	Marlboro Grand Prix	S Meadowlands Street Circuit	East Rutherford, New Jersey
10	July 21	Molson Indy Toronto	S Exhibition Place	Toronto, Ontario, Canada
11	August 4	Marlboro 500	O Michigan International Speedway	Brooklyn, Michigan
12	August 25	Texaco/Havoline Grand Prix of Denver	S Streets of Denver	Denver, Colorado
13	September 1	Molson Indy Vancouver	S Streets of Vancouver	Vancouver, British Columbia
14	September 15	Pioneer Electronics 200	R Mid-Ohio Sports Car Course	Lexington, Ohio
15	September 22	Texaco/Havoline 200	R Road America	Elkhart Lake, Wisconsin
16	October 6	Bosch Spark Plug Grand Prix	O Pennsylvania International Raceway	Lehigh Valley, Pennsylvania
NC	October 19	Marlboro Challenge	R Laguna Seca Raceway	Monterey, California
17	October 20	Toyota Monterey Grand Prix	R Laguna Seca Raceway	Monterey, California

* Indianapolis was USAC-sanctioned but counted towards the PPG Indy Car title.

== Results ==
Rd.	Race	Pole position	Most laps led	Race winner			
Rd.	Race	Pole position	Most laps led	Driver	Team	Chassis	Engine
1	Surfers Paradise	(United States) Michael Andretti	(United States) Al Unser Jr.	(United States) John Andretti	Hall-VDS Racing	Lola T91/00	Chevrolet
2	Long Beach	(United States) Michael Andretti	(United States) Al Unser Jr.	(United States) Al Unser Jr.	Galles-Kraco Racing	Lola T91/00	Chevrolet
3	Phoenix	(United States) Rick Mears	(Netherlands) Arie Luyendyk	(Netherlands) Arie Luyendyk	Vince Granatelli Racing	Lola T91/00	Chevrolet
4	Indianapolis	(United States) Rick Mears	(United States) Michael Andretti	(United States) Rick Mears	Marlboro Team Penske	Penske PC-20	Chevrolet
5	Milwaukee	(United States) Rick Mears	(United States) Michael Andretti	(United States) Michael Andretti	Newman/Haas Racing	Lola T91/00	Chevrolet
6	Detroit	(United States) Michael Andretti	(Brazil) Emerson Fittipaldi	(Brazil) Emerson Fittipaldi	Marlboro Team Penske	Penske PC-20	Chevrolet
7	Portland	(Brazil) Emerson Fittipaldi	(United States) Michael Andretti	(United States) Michael Andretti	Newman/Haas Racing	Lola T91/00	Chevrolet
8	Cleveland	(Brazil) Emerson Fittipaldi	(Brazil) Emerson Fittipaldi	(United States) Michael Andretti	Newman/Haas Racing	Lola T91/00	Chevrolet
9	Meadowlands	(United States) Rick Mears	(United States) Bobby Rahal	(United States) Bobby Rahal	Galles-Kraco Racing	Lola T91/00	Chevrolet
10	Toronto	(United States) Michael Andretti	(United States) Michael Andretti	(United States) Michael Andretti	Newman/Haas Racing	Lola T91/00	Chevrolet
11	Michigan	(United States) Rick Mears	(United States) Michael Andretti	(United States) Rick Mears	Marlboro Team Penske	Penske PC-20	Chevrolet
12	Denver	(United States) Michael Andretti	(United States) Al Unser Jr.	(United States) Al Unser Jr.	Galles-Kraco Racing	Lola T91/00	Chevrolet
13	Vancouver	(United States) Michael Andretti	(United States) Michael Andretti	(United States) Michael Andretti	Newman/Haas Racing	Lola T91/00	Chevrolet
14	Mid-Ohio	(United States) Michael Andretti	(United States) Michael Andretti	(United States) Michael Andretti	Newman/Haas Racing	Lola T91/00	Chevrolet
15	Road America	(United States) Bobby Rahal	(United States) Michael Andretti	(United States) Michael Andretti	Newman/Haas Racing	Lola T91/00	Chevrolet
16	Nazareth	(United States) Rick Mears	(United States) Michael Andretti	(Netherlands) Arie Luyendyk	Vince Granatelli Racing	Lola T91/00	Chevrolet
NC	Marlboro Challenge	(United States) Michael Andretti	(United States) Rick Mears	(United States) Michael Andretti	Newman/Haas Racing	Lola T91/00	Chevrolet
17	Laguna Seca	(United States) Michael Andretti	(United States) Michael Andretti	(United States) Michael Andretti	Newman/Haas Racing	Lola T91/00	Chevrolet

== Points standings ==
=== Driver standings ===
Pos	Driver	SUR (Australia)	LBH (United States)	PHX (United States)	INDY (United States)	MIL (United States)	DET (United States)	POR (United States)	CLE (United States)	MEA (United States)	TOR (Canada)	MIS (United States)	DEN (United States)	VAN (Canada)	MOH (United States)	ROA (United States)	NAZ (United States)	MAR (United States)	LAG (United States)	Pts
1	(United States) Michael Andretti	**14**	**16**	4	2*	1*	**19**	1*	1	16	**1***	14*	**3**	**1***	**1***	1*	3*	**1**	**1***	234
2	(United States) Bobby Rahal	2	2	2	19	4	2	3	3	1*	3	11	20	2	3	**4**	2	7	24	200
3	(United States) Al Unser Jr.	16*	1*	6	4	19	4	4	4	2	23	3	1*	3	5	2	4	4	2	197
4	(United States) Rick Mears	3	4	**5**	**1**	**15**	5	6	17	**3**	20	**1**	8	6	6	15	**15**	2*	5	145
5	(Brazil) Emerson Fittipaldi	19	17	3	11	8	1*	**2**	**2***	7	21	20	2	17	2	6	8	3	4	140
6	(Netherlands) Arie Luyendyk	9	5	1*	3	17	3	7	5	18	19	2	22	19	9	5	1	8	8	134
7	(United States) Mario Andretti	17	19	9	7	3	7	5	6	15	2	4	15	4	7	3	5	5	3	132
8	(United States) John Andretti	1	18	11	5	2	6	19	15	4	5	6	7	7	10	19	9	6	19	105
9	(United States) Eddie Cheever	15	3	8	31	7	12	9	8	5	17	7	4	12	8	7	6	10	6	91
10	(United States) Scott Pruett	5	24	12	12	13	17	8	23	17	4	13	5	5	4	17	18		7	67
11	(United States) Danny Sullivan	4	11	7	10	5	10	21	9	6	14	18	18	9	17	16	20	9	9	56
12	(United States) Scott Brayton	6	8	13	17	6	9	15	7	9	6	9	16	10	13	11	19		27	52
13	(Canada) Scott Goodyear	23	7	21	27	9	8	10	19	8	7	15	24	8	11	9	21		11	42
14	(United States) Tony Bettenhausen Jr.	10	12	18	9	12	13	13	13	21	11	5	10	18	18	13	10		16	27
15	(United States) Jeff Andretti RY	7	9	10	15	11	16	12	16	23	9	12	12	11	22	18	11		13	26
16	(United States) Mike Groff	8	23	16	24	18	22	11	10	11	8		Wth		20	8			15	22
17	(United States) Willy T. Ribbs				32		11		22	10			6	21		10	17		12	17
18	(Canada) John Jones								21	19	10	8	11	15	21	21	13		21	10
19	(United States) Ted Prappas R	22	6		DNQ		25	17	18	22	16		21	14	12	23			23	9
20	(United States) Gordon Johncock				6															8
21	(Canada) Paul Tracy R		22									21					7		25	6
22	(United States) Buddy Lazier	25	25		33		18		11		22		9		24	24			22	6
23	(Japan) Hiro Matsushita	21	13	14	16	10	14	14	14	12	15	19	14	16	14	12	12		20	6
24	(United States) Stan Fox				8															5
25	(Belgium) Didier Theys		10		DNQ		DNS	22	12	20	13		23		23	25			14	4
26	(United States) Pancho Carter				21	14						10								3
27	(Netherlands) Cor Euser R																		10	3
28	(Italy) Franco Scapini R	11																		2
29	(United States) Gary Bettenhausen				22^{F}															1
30	(United States) Randy Lewis	13	15	19	14					14	12	16	17		15	22			26	1
31	(United States) Dean Hall	12			DNQ															1
32	(United States) Jeff Wood			22			24	20					13	20	19	14	DNS		17	0
33	(United States) A. J. Foyt				28	16	23	16	20	13		17					16			0
34	(Canada) Ross Bentley R													13						0
35	(United States) Dominic Dobson				13															0
36	(Italy) Guido Daccò		14	20	Wth		21	18												0
37	(United States) Dennis Vitolo R	24	26				20										14			0
38	(Colombia) Roberto Guerrero				30		15				18		19						18	0
39	(United States) Mark Dismore R	20	21	15	Wth															0
40	(United States) Michael Greenfield														16	20				0
41	(United States) Al Unser			17																0
42	(Mexico) Bernard Jourdain		20		18															0
43	(United States) Phil Krueger	18	Wth																	0
44	(United States) Johnny Parsons				DNQ	20														0
45	(Australia) Geoff Brabham				20															0
46	(United States) Dale Coyne					21		23												0
47	(Italy) Nicola Marozzo R													22	DNS	DNQ				0
48	(Finland) Tero Palmroth				23															0
49	(United States) John Paul Jr.				25															0
50	(United Kingdom) Jim Crawford				26															0
51	(United States) Kevin Cogan				29															0
	(United States) Jon Beekhuis											DNS								0
	(United States) Tom Sneva				DNQ															0
	(United States) Salt Walther				DNQ															0
	(Italy) Tony de Tommaso R												DNQ							0
Pos	Driver	SUR (Australia)	LBH (United States)	PHX (United States)	INDY (United States)	MIL (United States)	DET (United States)	POR (United States)	CLE (United States)	MEA (United States)	TOR (Canada)	MIS (United States)	DEN (United States)	VAN (Canada)	MOH (United States)	ROA (United States)	NAZ (United States)	MAR (United States)	LAG (United States)	Pts

Color	Result
Gold	Winner
Silver	2nd place
Bronze	3rd place
Green	4th-6th place
Light Blue	7th-12th place
Dark Blue	Finished (Outside Top 12)
Purple	Did not finish
Red	Did not qualify (DNQ)
Brown	Withdrawn (Wth)
Black	Disqualified (DSQ)
White	Did not start (DNS)
Blank	Did not participate (DNP)
Blank	Not competing

**In-line notation**
**Bold**	Pole position
Italics	Ran fastest race lap
*	Led most race laps
^{F}	Fastest qualifier at the Indy 500
RY	Rookie of the Year
R	Rookie

=== Results by entrant ===
- Only full-time entrants and points scoring cars shown.

Pos	Driver	SUR (Australia)	LBH (United States)	PHX (United States)	INDY (United States)	MIL (United States)	DET (United States)	POR (United States)	CLE (United States)	MEA (United States)	TOR (Canada)	MIS (United States)	DEN (United States)	VAN (Canada)	MOH (United States)	ROA (United States)	NAZ (United States)	LAG (United States)	Pts
1	#2 Newman/Haas Racing	**14**	**16**	4	2*	1*	**19**	1*	1	16	**1***	14*	**3**	**1***	**1***	1*	3*	**1***	234
2	#18 Galles-Kraco Racing	2	2	2	19	4	2	3	3	1*	3	11	20	2	3	**4**	2	24	200
3	#1 Galles-Kraco Racing	16*	1*	6	4	19	4	4	4	2	23	3	1*	3	5	2	4	2	197
4	#3 Penske Racing	3	4	**5**	**1**	**15**	5	6	17	**3**	20	**1**	8	6	6	15	**15**	5	145
5	#5 Penske Racing	19	17	3	11	8	1*	**2**	**2***	7	21	20	2	17	2	6	8	4	140
6	#9 Vince Granatelli Racing	9	5	1*	3	17	3	7	5	18	19	2	22	19	9	5	1	8	134
7	#6 Newman/Haas Racing	17	19	9	7	3	7	5	6	15	2	4	15	4	7	3	5	3	132
8	#4 Hall-VDS Racing	1	18	11	5	2	6	19	15	4	5	6	7	7	10	19	9	19	105
9	#8 Chip Ganassi Racing	15	3	8	31	7	12	9	8	5	17	7	4	12	8	7	6	6	91
10	#11 Truesports	5	24	12	12	13	17	8	23	17	4	13	5	5	4	17	18	7	67
11	#20 Patrick Racing	4	11	7	10	5	10	21	9	6	14	18	18	9	17	16	20	9	56
12	#22 Dick Simon Racing	6	8	13	17	6	9	15	7	9	6	9	16	10	13	11	19	27	52
13	#15 UNO Racing	23	7	21	27	9	8	10	19	8	7	15	24	8	11	9	21	11	42
14	#16 Bettenhausen Motorsports	10	12	18	9	12	13	13	13	21	11	5	10	18	18	13	10	16	27
15	#86 Bayside Motorsports	7	9	10	15	11	16	12	16	23	9	12	12	11	22	18	11	13	26
16	#17 Walker Motorsport				32		11		22	10			6	21	24	10	17	12	17
17	#50 Euromotorsport Racing	8	23	16	24	18	22	11	10	11	18		13	20	19	14	DNS	17	12
18	#14 A. J. Foyt Enterprises		20	17	28	16	23	16	20	13	8	17	Wth		20	8	16	15	10
19	#12 Arciero Racing	20	21	15	21	14	24	20	21	19	10	8	11	15	21	21	13	21	10
20	#31 P.I.G. Enterprises	22	6		DNQ		25	17	18	22	16		21	14	12	23		23	9
21	#92 Hemelgarn Racing				6														8
22	#21 Leader Card Racing	12	10		DNQ	20	DNS	22	12	20	13	10	23		23	25		14	8
23	#17 Penske Racing											21					7	25	6
24	#7 Dick Simon Racing	21	13	14	16	10	14	14	14	12	15	19	14	16	14	12	12	20	6
25	#91 Hemelgarn-Byrd Racing				8														5
26	#39 Dale Coyne Racing	24	22	22			20				22		9		16	20		22	4
27	#90 Dale Coyne Racing	25	26				18									24		10	3
28	#19 Dale Coyne Racing	13	15	19	14	21		23	11	14	12	16	17	13	15	22	14	26	3
29	#42 Euromotorsport Racing	11			DNQ								DNQ	22	DNS	DNQ			2
30	#51 Menard Racing				22^{F}														1
Pos	Driver	SUR (Australia)	LBH (United States)	PHX (United States)	INDY (United States)	MIL (United States)	DET (United States)	POR (United States)	CLE (United States)	MEA (United States)	TOR (Canada)	MIS (United States)	DEN (United States)	VAN (Canada)	MOH (United States)	ROA (United States)	NAZ (United States)	LAG (United States)	Pts

=== Chassis Constructors' Cup ===
Pos	Chassis	Pts
1	(United Kingdom) Lola T9100/T9000/T8900/T8800	352
2	(United States) Penske PC-20/PC-19/PC-17	229
3	(United States) Truesports 91	67
Pos	Chassis	Pts

=== Engine Manufacturers' Cup ===
Pos	Engine	Pts
1	(United States) Chevrolet A	374
2	(United Kingdom) Judd	93
3	(United Kingdom) Cosworth DFS/DFX	57
4	(Italy) Alfa Romeo	56
5	(United States) Buick	15
Pos	Engine	Pts

== See also ==
- 1991 Indianapolis 500
- 1991 Toyota Atlantic Championship season
- 1991 Indy Lights season
