= Tommy Byrne (racing driver) =

Irish racing driver (born 1958)

- Born: Thomas Byrne; 6 May 1958 (age 68); Dundalk, County Louth, Ireland

Formula One World Championship career
- Nationality: (Republic of Ireland) Irish
- Active years: 1982
- Team: Theodore
- Entries: 5 (2 starts)
- Championships: 0
- Wins: 0
- Podiums: 0
- Career points: 0
- Pole positions: 0
- Fastest laps: 0
- First entry: 1982 German Grand Prix
- Last entry: 1982 Caesars Palace Grand Prix

Thomas Byrne (born 6 May 1958) is a former racing driver from Ireland. He participated in two Formula One Grands Prix in 1982 with the backmarker Theodore team, failing to qualify for another three. He failed to finish in either of the Grands Prix he started and scored no Formula One championship points.

== Career ==
After performing well in the Irish Formula Ford Championship in 1981, Byrne won the 1982 British Formula 3 Championship even though he missed some races while he competed in Formula One. At that time, he also tested a McLaren MP4/1 Formula One car in October 1982 against Marlboro-backed Spirit Racing's European F2 drivers like Stefan Johansson and Thierry Boutsen. During this test, he set a time quicker than the works drivers, Watson and Lauda, despite the car being specifically detuned for him and not the other drivers at the test. After a brief return to Formula Three in 1983, where he raced for Eddie Jordan, Byrne moved to the United States and began racing in the American Racing Series in 1986, where he won ten races in 55 starts, both second place in the series record books. He also was the championship runner-up in 1988 and 1989. He raced in the series until 1992 and then retired. Despite his extended career in the States, Byrne never made a Champ Car start. He lives in Florida, and teaches Honda Teen/Adult Defensive Driving, Advanced Defensive Driving, Acura High Performance and Acura Advanced Performance Driving during the race season at the Mid-Ohio Sports Car Course in Lexington, Ohio. He was also a driver coach for Indy Lights team Brian Stewart Racing.

Byrne co-authored a book with Mark Hughes which was released in the UK on 8 August 2008, titled Crashed and Byrned: The Greatest Racing Driver You Never Saw. The book won the William Hill Irish Sports Book of the Year for 2009.

Byrne was the subject of Seán Ó Cualáin's documentary Crash and Burn in 2016.

== Racing record ==
=== Career summary ===
Year	Series	Pos.
1982	Formula One	NC
1982	British Formula Three	**1st**
1983	British Formula Three	NC
1983	European Formula Three	4th
1983	1983 Macau Grand Prix	NC
1983	Formula Mondial North American Cup	15th
1984	European Formula Three	6th
1984	1984 Macau Grand Prix	8th
1984	Formula Super Vee	13th
1985	Formula Super Vee	NC
1986	Formula 3000	NC
1986	GT	24th
1986	Indy Lights	7th
1987	Indy Lights	**3rd**
1988	Indy Lights	**2nd**
1989	HFC American Racing Series Championship	**2nd**
1990	Firestone American Racing Series Championship	13th
1991	Firestone Indy Lights Championship	12th
1992	Firestone Indy Lights Championship	10th
2001	Grand American Road Racing	13th
2001	American Le Mans	NC
2002	Grand American Road Racing	**3rd**

=== Complete Formula One results ===
(key)

Year	Entrant	Chassis	Engine	1	2	3	4	5	6	7	8	9	10	11	12	13	14	15	16	WDC	Points
1982	Theodore Racing Team	Theodore TY02	Cosworth V8	RSA	BRA	USW	SMR	BEL	MON	DET	CAN	NED	GBR	FRA	GER; DNQ	AUT; Ret	SUI; DNQ	ITA; DNQ	CPL; Ret	NC	0

=== Complete FIA European Formula 3 Championship results ===
(key) (Races in bold indicate pole position) (Races in italics indicate fastest lap)

Year	Team	Chassis	Engine	1	2	3	4	5	6	7	8	9	10	11	12	13	14	15	16	DC	Points
1983	Eddie Jordan Racing	Ralt RT3	Volkswagen	VLL	NÜR; C	**ZOL**; 4	**MAG**; 5	ÖST; 1	LAC; Ret	SIL; 2	MNZ; 3	**MIS**; 1	ZAN; 7	KNU; 8	NOG; 5	JAR; Ret	IMO; Ret	DON; 12	CET; Ret	4th	35
1984	Anson Racing	Anson SA4	Alfa Romeo	DON; 2	ZOL; 9	MAG; 3	LAC; 7	ÖST; Ret	SIL; 9	NÜR; Ret	MNZ; Ret	PER; 5	MUG; 14	KNU; 6	NOG; 6	JAR				6th	14

=== Complete International Formula 3000 results ===
(key) (Races in bold indicate pole position; races in italics indicate fastest lap.)

Year	Entrant	Chassis	Engine	1	2	3	4	5	6	7	8	9	10	11	Pos.	Points
1986	Eddie Jordan Racing	March 86B	Cosworth	SIL	VAL	PAU	SPA	IMO	MUG	PER	ÖST	BIR; 15	BUG	JAR	41st	0

=== American open wheel racing results ===
(key)

==== Indy Lights ====
Year	Team	1	2	3	4	5	6	7	8	9	10	11	12	13	14	Rank	Points
1986	Agapiou Racing	PHX	MIL; 8	MEA; 2	TOR; 8	POC; 4	MOH; 12	ROA; 3	**LGA**; 13	PHX	MIA; 6					7th	62
1987	Opar Racing	PHX; 10	MIL; 4	MEA; 7	CLE; 2	**TOR**; 1	**POC**; 1	**MOH**; 4	NAZ; 7	LGA; 3	MIA; 7					3rd	120
1988	Opar Racing	PHX; 17	MIL	**POR**; 1		**TOR**; 2	MEA; 3	POC; 2	MOH; 2	ROA; 10	NAZ; 7	LGA; 1	MIA; 1			2nd	144
1988	R&K Racing				CLE; 6											2nd	144
1989	Landford Racing	PHX; 12	**LBH**; 4	MIL; 1	DET; 12	**POR**; 1	MEA; 2	**TOR**; 10	**POC**; 1	**MOH**; 13	ROA; 1	NAZ; 2	**LGA**; 4			2nd	153
1990	Genoa Racing	PHX; 9	LBH; 3	MIL; 6	DET; 1	POR; 7	CLE	MEA	TOR	DEN	VAN	MOH	ROA	NAZ	LAG	13th	52
1991	P.I.G. Racing	LBH; 8	PHX; 4	MIL	DET; 8	POR; 8	CLE	MEA	TOR	DEN	MOH	NAZ	LAG; 6			12th	35
1992	P.I.G. Racing	PHX; 5	LBH; 6	DET; 4	POR; 3	MIL; 13	NHA	TOR	CLE	VAN	MDO	NAZ	LGA			10th	44

Awards and achievements
Preceded by first winner	Autosport; National Racing Driver of the Year; 1982	Succeeded by Martin Brundle
Sporting positions
Preceded by Roberto Moreno	Formula Ford Festival Winner; 1981	Succeeded by Julian Bailey
Preceded by Jonathan Palmer	British Formula Three Champion; 1982	Succeeded by Ayrton Senna
