= 1989 American Racing Series season =

The 1989 HFC American Racing Series Championship consisted of 12 races. Mike Groff and Tommy Byrne each won 4 races and Groff edged out Byrne by 10 points for the championship.

== Calendar ==
Race No	Track	State	Date	Laps	Distance	Time	Speed	Winner	Pole position	Most leading laps	Fastest race lap
1	Phoenix	Arizona	April 8, 1989	65	1.6093=104.6045 km	0'44:49.340	140.026 km/h	Mike Groff	Mike Groff	Mike Groff	?
2	Long Beach	California	April 16, 1989	33	2.687531=120.938895 km	0'51:21.937	141.268 km/h	Tommy Byrne	Tommy Byrne	Tommy Byrne	?
3	Milwaukee	Wisconsin	June 4, 1989	100	1.6607976=166.07976 km	0'49:34.940	200.975 km/h	Mike Groff	Mike Groff	Mike Groff	?
4	Detroit	Michigan	June 18, 1989	30	4.02325=120.6975 km	0'56:22.334	128.465 km/h	Ted Prappas	Johnny O'Connell	Paul Tracy	?
5	Portland	Oregon	June 25, 1989	40	3.0930746=123.722984 km	0'44:07.160	168.257 km/h	Tommy Byrne	Tommy Byrne	Tommy Byrne	?
6	Meadowlands	New Jersey	July 16, 1989	63	1.9585181=123.38664 km	0'46:04.670	160.667 km/h	Mike Groff	Mike Groff	Mike Groff	?
7	Toronto	Canada	July 23, 1989	42	2.8709912=120.58163 km	0'49:56.568	144.864 km/h	Gary Rubio	Tommy Byrne	Tommy Byrne	?
8	Pocono	Pennsylvania	August 19, 1989	28	4.02325=112.651 km	0'34:16.943	197.158 km/h	Tommy Byrne	Tommy Byrne	Tommy Byrne	?
9	Mid-Ohio	Ohio	September 3, 1989	32	3.86232=123.59424 km	0'50:32.067	146.744 km/h	P. J. Jones	Tommy Byrne	P. J. Jones	?
10	Road America	Wisconsin	September 10, 1989	19	6.4372=122.3068 km	0'43:34.654	168.399 km/h	Tommy Byrne	Ted Prappas	Tommy Byrne	?
11	Nazareth	Pennsylvania	September 24, 1989	75	1.5223978=114.179835 km	0'59:07.610	115.866 km/h	Mike Groff	Dave Kudrave	Mike Groff	?
12	Laguna Seca	California	October 15, 1989	34	3.5629902=121.1416668 km	0'46:48.277	155.294 km/h	Johnny O'Connell	Tommy Byrne	Tommy Byrne	?

== Race summaries ==
=== Phoenix race ===
Held April 8 at Phoenix International Raceway. Mike Groff won the pole.

Top Five Results

1. Mike Groff
2. Paul Tracy
3. Dave Kudrave
4. Johnny O'Connell
5. Ted Prappas

=== Long Beach race ===
Held April 16 at Long Beach Street Circuit. Tommy Byrne won the pole.

Top Five Results

1. Tommy Byrne
2. P. J. Jones
3. Mitch Thieman
4. Daniel Campeau
5. Roberto Quintanilla

=== Milwaukee race ===
Held June 4 at The Milwaukee Mile. Mike Groff won the pole.

Top Five Results

1. Mike Groff
2. Dave Kudrave
3. Gary Rubio
4. Tommy Byrne
5. Steve Shelton

=== Detroit race ===
Held June 18 at the Detroit Street Circuit. Johnny O'Connell won the pole.

Top Five Results

1. Ted Prappas
2. Calvin Fish
3. Gary Rubio
4. Mike Groff
5. Steve Shelton

=== Portland race ===
Held June 25 at Portland International Raceway. Tommy Byrne won the pole.

Top Five Results

1. Tommy Byrne
2. Paul Tracy
3. Ted Prappas
4. Gary Rubio
5. Mike Groff

=== Meadowlands race ===
Held July 16 at the Meadowlands Sports Complex. Mike Groff won the pole.

Top Five Results

1. Mike Groff
2. Tommy Byrne
3. Gary Rubio
4. Paul Tracy
5. Steve Shelton

=== Toronto race ===
Held July 23 at Exhibition Place. Tommy Byrne won the pole.

Top Five Results

1. Gary Rubio
2. P. J. Jones
3. Dave Kudrave
4. Ted Prappas
5. Hunter Jones

=== Pocono race ===
Held August 19 at Pocono Raceway. Tommy Byrne won the pole.

Top Five Results

1. Tommy Byrne
2. Gary Rubio
3. Ted Prappas
4. Dave Kudrave
5. Johnny O'Connell

=== Mid-Ohio race ===
Held September 3 at The Mid-Ohio Sports Car Course. Tommy Byrne won the pole.

Top Five Results

1. P. J. Jones
2. Mike Groff
3. Paul Tracy
4. Ted Prappas
5. Gary Rubio

=== Elkhart Lake race ===
Held September 10 at Road America. Ted Prappas won the pole.

Top Five Results

1. Tommy Byrne
2. Johnny O'Connell
3. Gary Rubio
4. Mike Groff
5. Dave Kudrave

=== Nazareth race ===
Held September 24 at Nazareth Speedway. Dave Kudrave won the pole.

Top Five Results

1. Mike Groff
2. Tommy Byrne
3. Dave Kudrave
4. Marty Roth
5. Gary Rubio

=== Laguna Seca race ===
Held October 15 at Laguna Seca. Tommy Byrne won the pole.

Top Five Results

1. Johnny O'Connell
2. Mike Groff
3. P. J. Jones
4. Tommy Byrne
5. Dave Kudrave

== Final points standings ==
=== Driver ===
For every race the points were awarded: 20 points to the winner, 16 for runner-up, 14 for third place, 12 for fourth place, 10 for fifth place, 8 for sixth place, 6 seventh place, winding down to 1 points for 12th place. Additional points were awarded to the pole winner (1 point) and to the driver leading the most laps (1 point).

Place	Name	Country	Team	Total points	(United States)	(United States)	(United States)	(United States)	(United States)	(United States)	(Canada)	(United States)	(United States)	(United States)	(United States)	(United States)
1	Mike Groff	United States	Leading Edge Motorsport	163	22	4	22	12	10	22	6	-	16	12	21	16
2	Tommy Byrne	Ireland	Landford Racing	153	1	22	12	1	22	16	5	22	1	21	16	14
3	Gary Rubio	United States	Performance Motorsports	131	-	1	14	14	12	14	20	16	10	11	10	6
4	Dave Kudrave	United States	Leading Edge Motorsport	100	14	-	16	-	4	-	14	12	5	10	15	10
5	Ted Prappas	United States	TEAMKAR International	99	10	3	-	20
5	Ted Prappas	United States	P.I.G. Racing	99					14	6	12	14	12	2	6	-
6	P. J. Jones	United States	P.I.G. Racing	90	-	16	4	-	3	4	16	4	21	4	4	14
7	Johnny O'Connell	United States	C. P. Racing	72	12	-	-	1	5	8	-	10	-	16	-	20
8	Paul Tracy	Canada	Maple Leaf Racing	65	16	-	-	3	16	12	-	1	14	3	-	-
9	Steve Shelton	United States	Stuart Moore Racing	58	6	-	10	10	6	10	-	-	6	5	-	8
10	Roberto Quintanilla	Mexico	Roquin Motorsports	41	-	10	2	-	-	3	4	8	-	6	8	-
11	Hunter Jones	Canada	Baci Racing	34	-	-	-	6	-	5	10	5	8	-	-	-
	Tony George	United States	A. J. Foyt Enterprises	34	5	6	1	4	-	-	5	3	3	5	2	-
13	Daniel Campeau	Canada	McNeill Motorsports	33	-	12	8	8	1	-	2	2	-	-	-	-
14	Vinicio Salmi	Italy	Genoa Racing	23	2	-	-	-	8	-	1	-	1	8	1	2
15	Tom Christoff	Canada	Landford Racing	20	4	-	5	3	2	2	-	-	4	-	-	-
16	Calvin Fish	United Kingdom	P.I.G. Racing	16	-	-	-	16	-	-	-	-	-	-	-	-
17	Mitch Thieman	United States	Thieman Racing	14	-	14	-	-	-	-	-	-	-	-	-	-
	John Thompson	United States	Stuart Moore Racing	14	3	5	6	-	-	-	-	-	-	-	-	-
	Hiro Matsushita	Japan	Panasonic Racing	14	-	-	-	-	-	1	8	-	-	-	5	-
20	Marty Roth	Canada	Stuart Moore Racing	12	-	-	-	-	-	-	-	-	-	-	12	-
21	Dean Hall	United States	P.I.G. Racing	11	-	8	3	-	-	-	-	-	-	-	-	-
22	Steve Barclay	United States	R & K Racing	10	8	2	-	-	-	-	-	-	-	-	-	-
23	Salt Walther	United States	Walther Racing	6	-	-	-	-	-	-	-	6	-	-	-	-
24	Jeff Purner	United States	Stuart Moore Racing	5	-	-	-	5	-	-	-	-	-	-	-	-
	Jimmy Vasser	United States	Barclay Racing	5	-	-	-	-	-	-	-	-	-	-	-	5
26	Cathy Muller	France	McNeill Motorsports	4	-	-	-	-	-	-	-	-	-	-	-	4
27	Jeff Andretti	United States	Baci Racing	3	-	-	-	-	-	-	-	-	-	-	3	-
	Harald Huysman	Norway	McNeill Motorsports	3	-	-	-	-	-	-	-	-	-	-	-	3
	Brian Bonner	United States	TEAMKAR International	3	-	-	-	-	-	-	-	-	2	-	-	1

== Complete Overview ==
first column of every race	10	= grid position

second column of every race	10	= race result

R9=retired, but classified NS=did not start

Place	Name	Country	Team	(United States)		(United States)		(United States)		(United States)		(United States)		(United States)		(Canada)		(United States)		(United States)		(United States)		(United States)		(United States)
1	Mike Groff	United States	Leading Edge Motorsport	1	1	4	R9	1	1	8	4	8	5	1	1	6	7	4	R13	5	2	3	4	2	1	8	2
2	Tommy Byrne	Ireland	Landford Racing	6	12	1	1	13	4	3	R12	1	1	2	2	1	R10	1	1	1	13	2	1	4	2	1	4
3	Gary Rubio	United States	Performance Motorsports	12	R15	2	R12	2	3	5	3	4	4	4	3	5	1	2	2	7	5	8	3	7	5	10	7
4	Dave Kudrave	United States	Leading Edge Motorsport	3	3	5	R15	8	2	2	R16	5	9	5	R14	9	3	5	4	10	8	5	5	1	3	5	5
5	Ted Prappas	United States	TEAMKAR International	8	5	3	R10	-	-	6	1
5	Ted Prappas	United States	P.I.G. Racing									3	3	7	7	3	4	3	3	9	4	1	R12	10	7	6	R17
6	P. J. Jones	United States	P.I.G. Racing	14	R14	12	2	7	9	11	R14	6	10	11	9	12	2	6	8	2	1	4	9	9	9	2	3
7	Johnny O'Connell	United States	C. P. Racing	4	4	6	R16	3	R13	1	R13	9	8	8	6	11	R13	8	5	4	R18	7	2	5	R13	3	1
8	Paul Tracy	Canada	Maple Leaf Racing	2	2	7	R13	4	R14	4	R11	2	2	9	4	2	R16	13	R12	3	3	9	R10	3	R15	-	-
9	Steve Shelton	United States	Stuart Moore Racing	7	7	9	R14	5	5	7	5	10	7	6	5	4	R15	-	-	8	7	6	R11	-	-	4	6
10	Roberto Quintanilla	Mexico	Roquin Motorsports	11	R13	13	5	14	11	14	R15	-	-	14	10	17	9	9	6	13	R16	11	7	12	6	13	13
11	Hunter Jones	Canada	Baci Racing	-	-	-	-	-	-	12	7	-	-	10	8	13	5	7	8	6	6	10	R14	-	-	-	-
	Tony George	United States	A. J. Foyt Enterprises	16	8	18	7	12	12	17	9	17	R17	17	13	16	8	12	10	15	10	12	8	15	11	17	16
13	Daniel Campeau	Canada	McNeill Motorsports	17	R17	10	4	6	6	10	6	7	12	10	R15	8	11	14	11	17	R15	-	-	-	-	-	-
14	Vinicio Salmi	Italy	Genoa Racing	10	11	11	NS	-	-	-	-	11	6	3	R17	7	R12	-	-	11	12	14	6	8	12	7	11
15	Tom Christoff	Canada	Landford Racing	13	9	17	R17	9	8	15	10	15	11	13	11	10	R14	11	R14	14	9	13	R13	11	R14	16	15
16	Calvin Fish	United Kingdom	P.I.G. Racing	-	-	-	-	-	-	9	2	-	-	-	-	-	-	-	-	-	-	-	-	-	-	-	-
17	Mitch Thieman	United States	Thieman Racing	-	-	8	3	-	-	-	-	12	R16	-	-	-	-	-	-	-	-	-	-	-	-	-	-
	John Thompson	United States	Stuart Moore Racing	15	10	14	8	11	7	-	-	14	15	-	-	-	-	-	-	-	-	-	-	-	-	-	-
	Hiro Matsushita	Japan	Panasonic Racing	-	-	-	-	-	-	-	-	13	13	15	12	15	6	-	-	-	-	-	-	13	8	-	-
20	Marty Roth	Canada	TEAMKAR International	-	-	-	-	-	-	16	NS	-	-	16	R16	14	R17	-	-	-	-	-	-
20	Marty Roth	Canada	Stuart Moore Racing																					6	4	-	-
21	Dean Hall	United States	P.I.G. Racing	9	R16	15	R6	10	10	-	-	-	-	-	-	-	-	-	-	-	-	-	-	-	-	-	-
22	Steve Barclay	United States	R & K Racing	5	6	16	R11	-	-	-	-
22	Steve Barclay	United States	Barclay Racing									16	14	-	-	-	-	-	-	-	-	-	-	-	-	-	-
23	Salt Walther	United States	Walther Racing	-	-	-	-	-	-	-	-	-	-	-	-	-	-	10	7	18	R17	-	-	-	-	-	-
24	Jeff Purner	United States	Stuart Moore Racing	-	-	-	-	-	-	13	8	-	-	-	-	-	-	-	-	-	-	-	-	-	-	-	-
	Jimmy Vasser	United States	Barclay Racing	-	-	-	-	-	-	-	-	-	-	-	-	-	-	-	-	-	-	-	-	-	-	12	8
26	Cathy Muller	France	McNeill Motorsports	-	-	-	-	-	-	-	-	-	-	-	-	-	-	-	-	-	-	-	-	-	-	11	9
27	Jeff Andretti	United States	Baci Racing	-	-	-	-	-	-	-	-	-	-	-	-	-	-	-	-	-	-	-	-	14	10	-	-
	Harald Huysman	Norway	McNeill Motorsports	-	-	-	-	-	-	-	-	-	-	-	-	-	-	-	-	-	-	-	-	-	-	9	10
	Brian Bonner	United States	TEAMKAR International	-	-	-	-	-	-	-	-	-	-	-	-	-	-	-	-	12	11	-	-	-	-	15	12
-	Harry Sauce	United States	Barclay Racing	-	-	-	-	-	-	-	-	-	-	-	-	-	-	-	-	16	14	-	-	-	-	-	-
-	Arthur Abrahams	Australia	Baci Racing	-	-	-	-	-	-	-	-	-	-	-	-	-	-	-	-	-	-	-	-	-	-	14	14
