= Steve Barclay (disambiguation) =

Steve Barclay (born 1972) is a British politician.

Steve Barclay may also refer to:

- Steve Barclay (actor) (1918–1994), American actor in Italian films
- Steve Barclay (racing driver) (born 1944), American competitor during 1980s and 1990s
