= 1991 Champ Car season =

The 1991 Champ Car season may refer to:

- the 1990–91 USAC Championship Car season, which was just one race, the 75th Indianapolis 500
- the 1991 CART PPG Indy Car World Series, sanctioned by CART, who would later become Champ Car
