= Jeff Wood (racing driver) =

American Champ car driver

Jeff Wood (born January 20, 1957) is an American former race car driver born in Wichita, Kansas. He was Formula Atlantic Rookie of the Year in 1977. He drove in the CanAm series for Carl Haas in 1981 and finished fifth in the series behind Danny Sullivan. In 1982, driving for Bob Garretson Racing, finished third place in the 24 Hours of Daytona. He then made his CART debut in 1983 at the Caesars Palace Grand Prix driving for Dan Gurney. He then drove in the Formula Atlantic West Series where he won the 1985 championship.

Wood returned to CART in 1987 and made four starts for Dick Simon with his best finish being tenth. He was away from the series in 1988, then returned in 1989 to make five starts for Gohr Racing, where he finished 12th at the Michigan 500. In 1990 he drove for a new team, Todd Walther Racing, where he made his first attempt to qualify for the Indianapolis 500, but crashed in practice. He made ten other starts, with a tenth-place finish at Phoenix, finishing 22nd in points.

In 1991, Wood made eight starts for Dale Coyne Racing, Arciero Racing, and Euromotorsports with the best finish being 13th. He then made seven starts in '92 for Arciero, and earned a best finish of 12th-place and a single point. In 1993, Wood attempted a nearly full season for Andrea Moda Formula/Euromotorsports but failed to qualify for six races and only made eight starts and again failed to score points. He made four more unsuccessful starts in 1994 for Euromotorsports in what would be his final races in the series. He was named to an entry for the 1996 Indianapolis 500, but the car failed to appear. His best finish in his 49 CART races was an 8th place that came in his second series start back in 1983 at Laguna Seca Raceway.

== Racing record ==
=== SCCA National Championship Runoffs ===
Year	Track	Car	Engine	Class	Finish	Start	Status
1977	Road Atlanta	March 77B	Cosworth	Formula B	4	5	Running

=== Complete USAC Mini-Indy Series results ===
Year	Entrant	1	2	3	4	5	6	Pos	Points
1980		MIL	POC	MOH	MIN1	MIN2	ONT; 6	19th	80

==== PPG Indy Car Series ====
PPG Indy Car Series results
Year	Team	Chassis	Engine	1	2	3	4	5	6	7	8	9	10	11	12	13	14	15	16	17	Rank	Points	Ref
1983	All American Racers	Eagle 83	Chevrolet V8	ATL	INDY	MIL	CLE	MCH	ROA	POC	RIV	MOH	MCH	CPL; 22	LAG; 8	PHX					24th	5	
1985	Hess Racing	Lola T900	Cosworth DFX V8t	LBH	INDY	MIL	POR	MEA	CLE; 23	MCH	ROA	POC	MOH	SAN	MCH	LAG	PHX	MIA			-	0	
1987	Dick Simon Racing	Lola T87/00	Cosworth DFX V8t	LBH	PHX	INDY	MIL	POR	MEA	CLE	TOR	MCH	POC	ROA; 10	MOH; 15	NAZ; DNQ	LAG; 10	MIA; 23			33rd	6	
1989	Gohr Racing	Lola T88/00	Cosworth DFS V8t	PHX	LBH	INDY	MIL	DET	POR	CLE; 15	MEA; 15	TOR; DNQ	MCH; 12	POC	MOH; 16	ROA; 15	NAZ; DNQ	LAG; DNQ			32nd	1	
1990	U.S. Engineering	Lola T88/00	Cosworth DFS / DFX V8t	PHX; 11	LBH																22nd	7	
1990	U.S. Engineering	Lola T89/00	Cosworth DFS / DFX V8t			INDY; DNQ	MIL	DET; 11	POR	CLE; 10	MEA; 20	TOR; 24	MCH; 25	DEN; 19	VAN	MOH; 14	ROA; 23	NAZ	LAG; 19		22nd	7	
1991	Dale Coyne Racing	Lola T89/00	Cosworth DFX V8t	SRF	LBH	PHX; 22	INDY	MIL													32nd	0	
1991	Arciero Racing	Lola T89/00	Buick 3300 V6 tc						DET; 24	POR; 20	CLE	MEA	TOR	MCH							32nd	0	
1991	Euromotorsport	Lola T91/00	Cosworth DFS V8t												DEN; 13	VAN; 20	MOH; 19	ROA; 14	NAZ; DNS	LAG; 17	32nd	0	
1992	Arciero Racing	Lola T91/00	Buick 3300 V6 tc	SRF	PHX	LBH	INDY; DNQ	DET; 13	POR; 19	MIL; 19	NHA; 15	TOR; 13	MCH; 12	CLE	ROA	VAN					34th	1	
1992	Euromotorsport	Lola T91/00	Cosworth DFS V8t														MOH; 13	NAZ	LAG		34th	1	
1993	Euromotorsport	Lola T91/00	Cosworth DFS V8t	SRF	PHX; Wth	LBH; 20	INDY	MIL; DNQ	DET; DNQ	POR; 28	CLE; 17	TOR; 28	MCH; 20	NHA; 24	ROA; 27	VAN; 15	MOH; DNQ	NAZ	LAG; DNQ		41st	0	
1994	Euromotorsport	Lola T92/00	Ilmor 265A V8t	SRF	PHX	LBH	INDY	MIL	DET	POR; 29	CLE; 23	TOR; 28	MCH; 17	MOH; DNQ	NHA; DNQ	VAN	ROA				43rd	0	
1994	Euromotorsport	Lola T93/07	Ilmor 265C V8t															NAZ; DNQ	LAG; DNQ		43rd	0	
1995	Project Indy	Reynard 94I	Ford XB V8t	MIA	SRF	PHX	LBH	NAZ	INDY	MIL	DET	POR	ROA	TOR; Wth	CLE	MCH	MOH	NHA	VAN	LAG	-	0	

Sporting positions
Preceded by Dan Marvin	North American Formula Atlantic; Pacific Division Champion; 1985	Succeeded by Ted Prappas
