= Cheryl Glass =

American racing driver (1961–1997)

- Glass on the cover of Pacific Northwest magazine, 1984
- Born: Cheryl Linn Glass; December 24, 1961 Mountain View, California, U.S.
- Died: July 15, 1997 (aged 35) Seattle, Washington, U.S.

Indy Lights career
- Debut season: 1990
- Car number: No. 18
- Former teams: Glass Racing
- Starts: 3
- Wins: 0
- Poles: 0
- Fastest laps: 0
- Best finish: 22nd in 1990

Cheryl Linn Glass (December 24, 1961 – July 15, 1997) was an American racing driver. She was among the first African-American, female racing drivers in the United States. She began her career racing sprint cars in the Northwestern United States, before attempting to race at a national level. She briefly competed in Indy Lights, a level below that of Indy car racing.

== Biography ==
Glass was born on December 24, 1961, in Mountain View, California, the first of two daughters born to Marvin and Shirley Glass. She moved with her family to Seattle, Washington in 1963. Her father was a vice president of Pacific Northwest Bell and her mother was an engineer for Boeing. She attended Nathan Hale High School, graduating with honors at 16, and studied electrical engineering at Seattle University.

At the age of nine, Glass started her own business, making high-end ceramic dolls and selling them to local businesses such as Frederick & Nelson. The dolls, which took about three months to complete, sold for $150–$300 each. At around the same time, she became interested in racing after reading a newspaper article about local children driving quarter-midget race cars. She was able to buy equipment with her own earnings, and with her father's support began racing in the midget circuit. In her first year of competition, she was the first girl ever to be named Rookie of the Year. For five consecutive years she was state and regional champion and was one of the top ten drivers nationally. She later switched to racing the heavier, faster, half-midgets.

At the age of 18, Glass dropped out of college, bought her first sprint car, and began racing at Skagit Speedway in Mount Vernon, Washington, where she was the first woman sprint car driver. That year the Northwest Sprint Car Association named her Rookie of the Year. After winning the season championship race at Skagit Speedway, she went on to compete in more than 100 professional races, making her the first African American female professional race car driver. She was nicknamed "The Lady." Her dream was to compete in Indy car and the Indianapolis 500, before eventually moving to Formula One racing. Her career was cut short, however, either due to injuries, as reported by the LA Times, or lack of funds. Her last race, at the Phoenix International Raceway in April 1991, ended in a crash.

In February 1983, Glass married Richard Lindwall, designing her own silk and lace gown for the ceremony. Soon afterwards she opened a custom design studio, Cheryl Glass Designs, where she worked for 12 years designing wedding and formal evening wear. She also gave speeches to groups of students and political action groups; for example, she spoke to 1,500 junior high school students in Washington D.C. in support of the U.S. Department of Transportation's drunk driving and drug abuse prevention program.

In 1991, Glass survived a rape that occurred in her home during a burglary. The intruders also defaced her wall with a hate symbol. Authorities dismissed her rape report, claiming there was not enough evidence to bring charges. On July 15, 1997, she died by suicide by jumping from the Aurora Bridge in Seattle.

== Awards and honors ==
- Candace Award for Trailblazing from the National Coalition of 100 Black Women, 1987
- Wendell Scott Greased Lightning Award from the Wendell Scott Foundation
- Named one of America's Top 100 Black Business and Professional Women by Dollars and Sense magazine
- One of five African Americans featured in an hour-long TBS special, The Achievers, during Black History Month, 1988
