= Cathy Muller =

French racing driver

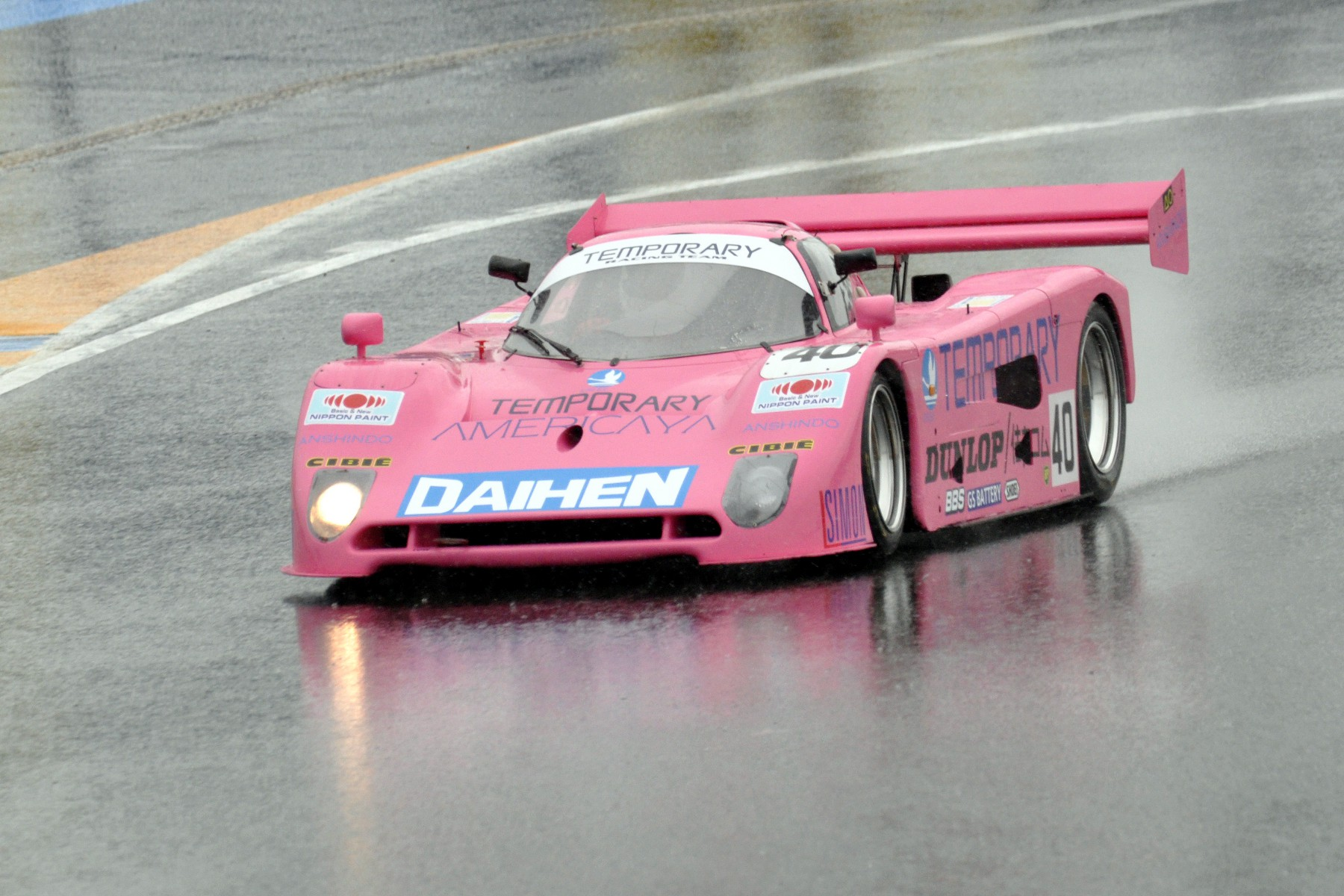
- The Spice SE90C of Desiré Wilson, Cathy Muller and Lyn St. James at the 1991 24 Hours of Le Mans
- Nationality: (France) French
- Born: Catherine Marie Muller; 21 November 1962 (age 63) Haut-Rhin, France
- Relatives: Yves Ehrlacher (husband); Yvan Muller (brother); Yann Ehrlacher (son)

Previous series
- 1981 1982-85 1984,1989 1984,87,91 1985 1986,1988 1987 1987 1989-90 1993-94 2010: Renault 5 Turbo Eurocup; European Formula 3 French Formula 3 World Sportscar Championship; British Formula 3 Formula 3000; German Formula 3 Italian Formula 3 Indy Lights; Peugeot 905 Spider Cup; SEAT Leon Supercopa

Catherine Marie "Cathy" Muller (born 21 November 1962) is a French former racing driver. She is the older sister of racing driver Yvan Muller and the mother of racing driver Yann Ehrlacher.

== Racing career ==
=== Junior formulae ===
Muller started racing in the Renault 5 Turbo series in the early 1980s. From there, she graduated into the French Formula Renault Turbo Championship finishing fifth driving a Martini Mk36. She then moved to European Formula 3 driving for David Price Racing in 1983 and Pavesi Racing in 1984. In 1985, she raced in the British Formula Three Championship again driving for David Price Racing finishing ninth. After a few seasons in Formula 3000, she returned to the French Formula Three Championship finishing tenth.

=== Formula 3000 and Indy Lights ===
In 1986, Muller raced in Formula 3000 for the first time, qualifying for four events. She returned in 1988, failing to qualify for the season opening race. In 1990, she moved to the American Indy Lights Championship after racing in one race in 1989, finishing sixteenth for the season.

=== Sportscars ===
Muller made her debut in the World Sportscar Championship at the 1984 Sandown 1000 driving for Gebhardt Motorsport. In 1987, she finished seventh in the 1000 km of Nürburgring and raced in the 1991 24 Hours of Le Mans where she did not finish.

In 1993 and 1994, Muller raced in the Peugeot 905 Spider Cup, finishing fifth and second in the championship respectively.

== Racing record ==
=== Complete International Formula 3000 results ===
(key) (Races in bold indicate pole position; races in italics indicate fastest lap.)

| Year | Entrant | 1 | 2 | 3 | 4 | 5 | 6 | 7 | 8 | 9 | 10 | 11 | DC | Points |
|---|---|---|---|---|---|---|---|---|---|---|---|---|---|---|
| 1986 | Hotz-Horag Racing/FTL | SIL | VAL | PAU; DNQ | SPA; 17 | IMO; Ret | MUG; 17 | PER; DNQ | | | | | **NC** | **0** |
| 1986 | Oreca Motorsport | | | | | | | | ÖST; DNQ | BIR | | JAR; Ret | **NC** | **0** |
| 1986 | Gethin Racing | | | | | | | | | | BUG; 17 | | **NC** | **0** |
| 1988 | Pavesi Racing | JER; DNQ | VAL | PAU | SIL | MON | PER | BRH | BIR | BUG | ZOL | DIJ | **NC** | **0** |

=== Complete Indy Lights results ===
| Year | Team | 1 | 2 | 3 | 4 | 5 | 6 | 7 | 8 | 9 | 10 | 11 | 12 | 13 | Rank | Points | Ref |
|---|---|---|---|---|---|---|---|---|---|---|---|---|---|---|---|---|---|
| 1989 | McNeill Motorsports | PHX | LBH | DET | POR | NHM | TOR | POC | ROA | VAN | MDO | NZR | LS; 9 | | **24th** | **4** | |
| 1990 | McNeill Racing | PHX; 12 | LBH; 7 | | | | | | | | | | | | **16th** | **28** | |
| 1990 | Stuart Moore Racing | | | MIL; 17 | DET; 16 | POR; 15 | NHM; 12 | TOR; 5 | DEN; 5 | VAN | ROA | MDO | NZR | LS | **16th** | **28** | |

=== Complete 24 Hours of Le Mans results ===
| Year | Class | No | Tyres | Car | Team | Co-Drivers | Laps | Pos. | Class Pos. |
|---|---|---|---|---|---|---|---|---|---|
| 1991 | C1 | 40 | **D** | Spice SE90C; Ford Cosworth DFZ 3.5L V8 | (Netherlands) Euro Racing (Japan) A.O. Racing | (South Africa) Desiré Wilson (United States) Lyn St. James | 47 | DNF | DNF |
