= Ted Prappas =

American racing driver (1955–2022)

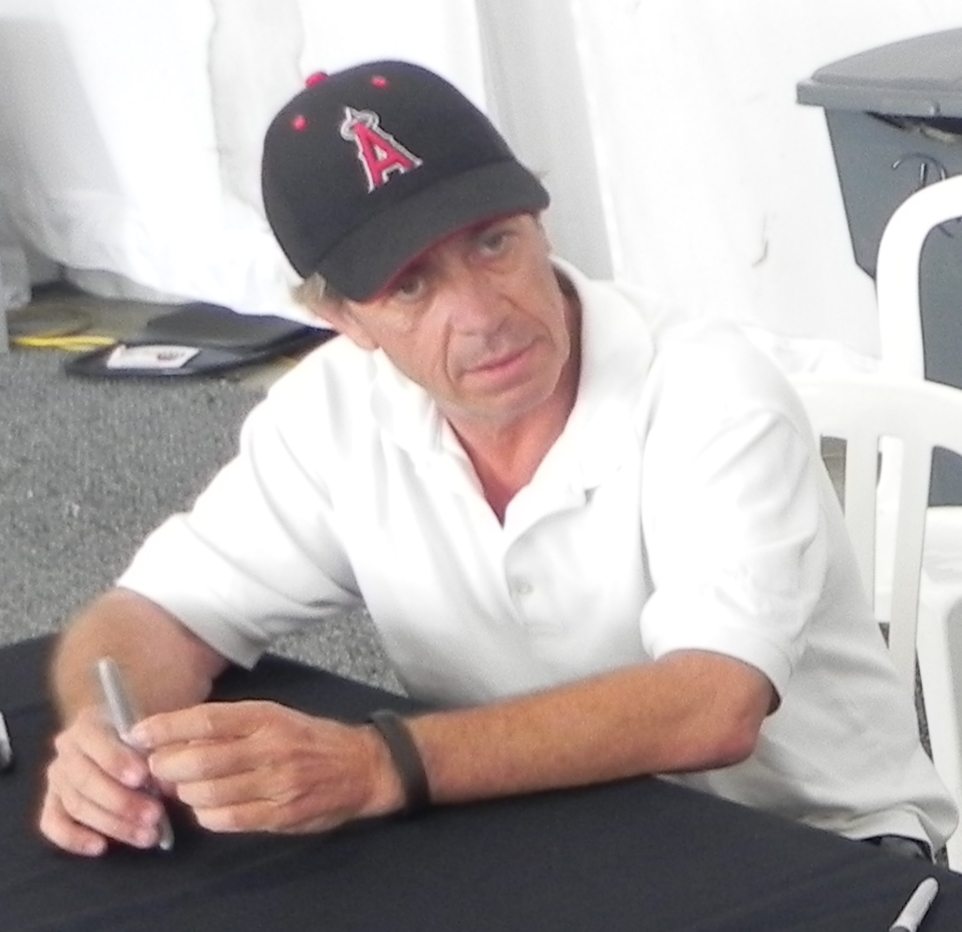
Prappas at the 2014 Indianapolis 500

Theodore Panos Prappas (November 14, 1955 – April 22, 2022), was a driver in the CART Championship Car series. He raced in the 1991-1992 seasons with 26 career starts, including the 1992 Indianapolis 500. He finished in the top-ten four times and his best career finish was in sixth position at the 1991 Grand Prix of Long Beach. He finished the 1991 season as runner-up to Jeff Andretti for Rookie of the Year.

Before moving to CART, Prappas was the 1986 West Coast Atlantic Racing champion and was runner up in the 1990 Indy Lights championship. He started racing in Super Vee in 1983, in a car bought for him by James Stewart, who had previously hired his mother as his business agent.

Prappas died April 22, 2022, aged 66 of colon cancer.

== Career results ==
=== American Racing Series ===
American Racing Series / Indy Lights results
Year	Team	1	2	3	4	5	6	7	8	9	10	11	12	13	14	Rank	Points
1988	TEAMKAR International	PHX; 5	MIL; 6	POR; 12	CLE; 8	TOR; 5	MEA; 4	POC; 5	MDO; 3	ROA; 3	NAZ; 10	LS; 6	MIA; 6			6th	103
1989	TEAMKAR International	PHX; 5	LBH; 10	MIL	DET; 1											5th	99
1989	P.I.G. Racing					POR; 3	MEA; 7	TOR; 4	POC; 3	MDO; 4	ROA; 12	NAZ; 7	LS; 17			5th	99
1990	P.I.G. Racing	PHX; 4	LBH; 8	MIL; 4	DET; 5	POR; 5	CLE; 5	MEA; 2	TOR; 2	DEN; 11	VAN; 10	MDO; 11	ROA; 12	NAZ; 3	LS; 1	2nd	135

=== CART ===
PPG IndyCar World Series results
Year	Team	Chassis	Engine	1	2	3	4	5	6	7	8	9	10	11	12	13	14	15	16	17	Rank	Points	Ref
1991	P.I.G. Enterprises	Lola T91/00	Judd V8t	SRF; 22	LBH; 6	PHX	INDY; DNQ	MIL	DET; 25	POR; 17	CLE; 18	MEA; 22	TOR; 16	MIC	DEN; 21	VAN; 14	MDO; 12	ROA; 23	NAZ	LAG; 23	19th	9	
1992	P.I.G. Enterprises	Lola T92/00	Chevrolet 265A V8t	SRF; 10	PHX	LBH; 14	INDY; 16	DET; 14	POR; 15	MIL; 15	NHA; 20	TOR; 23	MIC	CLE; 13	ROA; 10	VAN; 9	MDO; 11	NAZ; 19	LAG; 18		17th	12	

Sporting positions
Preceded by Jeff Wood	North American Formula Atlantic; Pacific Division Champion; 1986	Succeeded by Johnny O'Connell
