= 1990 American Racing Series season =

The 1990 Firestone American Racing Series Championship consisted of 14 races. Paul Tracy won nine times and captured seven poles on his way to the championship.

== Calendar ==
Race No	Track	State	Date	Laps	Distance	Time	Speed	Winner	Pole position	Most leading laps	Fastest race lap
1	Phoenix	Arizona	April 7, 1990	100	1.6093=160.93 km	1'02:25.213	154.690 km/h	Paul Tracy	Mark Smith	Paul Tracy	?
2	Long Beach	California	April 22, 1990	43	1.834602=78.887886 km	0'51:49.703	91.326 km/h	Paul Tracy	Paul Tracy	Paul Tracy	?
3	Milwaukee	Wisconsin	June 3, 1990	87	1.6607976=144.489391 km	0'49:03.020	176.744 km/h	Paul Tracy	Robbie Buhl	Paul Tracy	?
4	Detroit	Michigan	June 17, 1990	24	4.02325=96.558 km	0'58:28.764	99.069 km/h	Tommy Byrne	Paul Tracy	Paul Tracy	?
5	Portland	Oregon	June 24, 1990	40	3.0930746=123.722984 km	0'46:01.151	161.311 km/h	Paul Tracy	Paul Tracy	Paul Tracy	?
6	Cleveland	Ohio	July 8, 1990	32	3.8124317=121.9978144 km	0'37:52.520	193.262 km/h	Paul Tracy	Paul Tracy	Paul Tracy	?
7	Meadowlands	New Jersey	July 15, 1990	63	1.9585181=123.38664 km	0'48:32.089	152.534 km/h	Paul Tracy	Paul Tracy	Paul Tracy	?
8	Toronto	Canada	July 22, 1990	42	2.8709912=120.58163 km	0'51:50.015	139.579 km/h	Paul Tracy	Ted Prappas	Paul Tracy	?
9	Denver	Colorado	August 26, 1990	25	3.05767=76.44175 km	0'46:41.156	98.242 km/h	Mark Rodrigues	P. J. Jones	Robbie Buhl	?
10	Vancouver	Canada	September 2, 1990	44	2.8500703=125.4030932 km	0'52:28.220	143.399 km/h	Vinicio Salmi	Paul Tracy	Paul Tracy	?
11	Mid-Ohio	Ohio	September 16, 1990	29.5	3.86232=113.45565 km	0'53:43.000	126.727 km/h	Brian Till	Robbie Buhl	Paul Tracy	?
12	Road America	Wisconsin	September 23, 1990	19	6.4372=122.3068 km	0`53:43.000	km/h	Paul Tracy	Mike Snow	Paul Tracy	?
13	Nazareth	Pennsylvania	October 7, 1990	75	1.5223978=114.179835 km	0'33:55.189	201.970 km/h	Robbie Groff	Robbie Buhl	Robbie Groff	?
14	Laguna Seca	California	October 21, 1990	34	3.5629902=121.1416668 km	0'55:03.40	132.018 km/h	Ted Prappas	Paul Tracy	Ted Prappas	?

== Race summaries ==
=== Phoenix race ===
Held April 7 at Phoenix International Raceway. Mark Smith won the pole.

Top Five Results

1. Paul Tracy
2. Mark Smith
3. Éric Bachelart
4. Ted Prappas
5. Marty Roth

=== Long Beach race ===
Held April 22 at Long Beach Street Circuit. Paul Tracy won the pole.

Top Five Results

1. Paul Tracy
2. Mark Smith
3. Tommy Byrne
4. Steve Shelton
5. Johnny O'Connell

=== Milwaukee race ===
Held June 3 at The Milwaukee Mile. Robbie Buhl won the pole.

Top Five Results

1. Paul Tracy
2. Robbie Buhl
3. Robbie Groff
4. Ted Prappas
5. P. J. Jones

=== Detroit race ===
Held June 17 at the Detroit Street Circuit. Paul Tracy won the pole.

Top Five Results

1. Tommy Byrne
2. Éric Bachelart
3. Mike Snow
4. Justin Bell
5. Ted Prappas

=== Portland race ===
Held June 24 at Portland International Raceway. Paul Tracy won the pole.

Top Five Results

1. Paul Tracy
2. P. J. Jones
3. Mike Snow
4. Mitch Thieman
5. Ted Prappas

=== Cleveland race ===
Held July 8 at Burke Lakefront Airport. Paul Tracy won the pole.

Top Five Results

1. Paul Tracy
2. P. J. Jones
3. Éric Bachelart
4. Mark Smith
5. Ted Prappas

=== Meadowlands race ===
Held July 15 at the Meadowlands Sports Complex. Paul Tracy won the pole.

Top Five Results

1. Paul Tracy
2. Ted Prappas
3. Mike Snow
4. Robbie Buhl
5. Cathy Muller

=== Toronto race ===
Held July 22 at Exhibition Place. Ted Prappas won the pole.

Top Five Results

1. Paul Tracy
2. Ted Prappas
3. P. J. Jones
4. Vinicio Salmi
5. Cathy Muller

=== Denver race ===
Held August 26 at the Denver, Colorado street circuit. P. J. Jones won the pole.

Top Five Results

1. Mark Rodrigues
2. Robbie Buhl
3. Vinicio Salmi
4. Marty Roth
5. Roberto Quintanilla

=== Vancouver race ===
Held September 2 at Pacific Place. Paul Tracy won the pole.

Top Five Results

1. Vinicio Salmi
2. Mark Smith
3. Marty Roth
4. Tom Christoff
5. Paul Tracy

=== Mid-Ohio race ===
Held September 16 at The Mid-Ohio Sports Car Course. Robbie Buhl won the pole.

Top Five Results

1. Paul Tracy
2. Robbie Buhl
3. Robbie Groff
4. Tom Christoff
5. Mark Rodrigues

=== Elkhart Lake race ===
Held September 23 at Road America. Mike Snow won the pole.

Top Five Results

1. Paul Tracy
2. Robbie Buhl
3. Mark Smith
4. Éric Bachelart
5. Robbie Groff

=== Nazareth race ===
Held October 7 at Nazareth Speedway. Robbie Buhl won the pole.

Top Five Results

1. Robbie Groff
2. Robbie Buhl
3. Ted Prappas
4. Mark Rodrigues
5. Mark Smith

=== Laguna Seca race ===
Held October 21 at Laguna Seca. Paul Tracy won the pole.

Top Five Results

1. Ted Prappas
2. Mike Snow
3. Robbie Groff
4. Vinicio Salmi
5. Mark Smith

== Final points standings ==
=== Driver ===
For every race the points were awarded: 20 points to the winner, 16 for runner-up, 14 for third place, 12 for fourth place, 10 for fifth place, 8 for sixth place, 6 seventh place, winding down to 1 points for 12th place. Additional points were awarded to the pole winner (1 point) and to the driver leading the most laps (1 point).

Place	Name	Country	Team	Total points	(United States)	(United States)	(United States)	(United States)	(United States)	(United States)	(United States)	(Canada)	(United States)	(Canada)	(United States)	(United States)	(United States)	(United States)
1	Paul Tracy	Canada	Landford Racing	214	21	22	21	5	22	22	22	21	-	12	21	21	3	1
2	Ted Prappas	United States	P.I.G. Racing	135	12	5	12	10	10	10	16	17	2	3	2	1	14	21
3	Mark Smith	United States	Evergreen Racing	128	17	16	4	2	8	12	3	8	4	16	4	14	10	10
4	Robbie Buhl	United States	Leading Edge Motorsport	118	-	-	17	-	4	8	12	2	17	8	17	16	17	-
5	Robbie Groff	United States	Groff Motorsports	104	5	8	14	6	1	4	4	-	3	-	14	10	21	14
6	Mike Snow	United States	Bradley Motorsports	89	-	-	1	14	14	6	11	-	5	1	8	6	4	16
7	Mark Rodrigues	United States	Leading Edge Motorsport	76	3	-	6	-	-	2	5
7	Mark Rodrigues	United States	McNeill Motorsports	76								4	20	6	10	8	12	-
8	P. J. Jones	United States	P.I.G. Racing	68	-	-	10	1	16	16	1	14	2	2	1	-	5	-
	Vinicio Salmi	Italy	Genoa Racing	68	-	-	-	-	5	-	2	12	14	20	-	3	-	12
10	Éric Bachelart	Belgium	Ganassi-Stimola Racing ARS	63	14	2	17	16	-	14	-	-	-	5	-	12	-	-
11	Marty Roth	Canada	Stuart Moore Racing	59	10	-	-	8	-	-	6	6	12	14	3	-	-	-
	Tom Christoff	Canada	Landford Racing	59	-	-	3	-	-	3	8	-	8	12	12	4	8	1
13	Tommy Byrne	Ireland	Genoa Racing	52	4	14	8	20	6	-	-	-	-	-	-	-	-	-
14	Roberto Quintanilla	Mexico	Roquin Motorsports	38	-	-	2	-	2	-	-	-	10	4	6	6	-	8
15	Justin Bell	United Kingdom	Ganassi-Stimola Racing ARS	29	-	4	-	12	-	5	-	3	-	-	5	-	-	-
16	Cathy Muller	France	McNeill Motorsports	28	1	6
16	Cathy Muller	France	Stuart Moore Racing	28			-	-	-	1	10	10	-	-	-	-	-	-
17	Steve Sheldon	United States	Stuart Moore Racing	21	8	12	-	-	-	-	-
17	Steve Sheldon	United States	McNeill Motorsport	21								1	-	-	-	-	-	-
18	Hunter Jones	Canada	Baci Racing	17	6	1	5	-	-	-	-	5	-	-	-	-	-	-
19	Johnny O'Connell	United States	R & K Racing	16	-	10	-	-	-	-	-	-	-	-	-	-	-
19	Johnny O'Connell	United States	Essex Racing	16														6
20	Mitch Thieman	United States	Thieman Racing	12	-	-	-	-	12	-	-	-	-	-	-	-	-	-
21	Colin Trueman	United States	TrueSports Racing	7	-	-	-	4	3	-	-	-	-	-	-	-	-	-
22	John Brooks	United States	Baci Racing	6	-	-	-	-	-	-	-	-	6	-	-	-	-	-
	Cheryl Glass	United States	Glass Racing	6	-	-	-	-	-	-	-	-	-	-	-	-	6	-
24	Dave Kudrave	United States	Dave White Motorsports	5	2	3	-	-	-	-	-	-	-	-	-	-	-	-
	Brian Bonner	United States	TEAMKAR International	5	-	-	-	5	-	-	-	-	-	-	-	-	-	-
	John Marconi	United States	Leading Edge Motorsport	5	-	-	-	-	-	-	-	-	-	-	-	-	-	5
27	E.J. Lenzi	United States	Baci Racing	4	-	-	-	-	-	-	-	-	-	-	-	2	2	-
	Mark Ritchey	United States	P.I.G. Racing	4	-	-	-	-	-	-	-	-	-	-	-	-	-	4
29	Bob Dorricott Jr.	United States	Cameron-McGee Motorsports	3	-	-	-	-	-	-	-	-	-	-	-	-	-	3
30	Dale Evans	United States	Bradley Motorsports	2	-	-	-	-	-	-	-	-	-	-	-	-	-	2

Note:

Race 13 not all points were awarded (not enough competitors).

== Complete Overview ==
first column of every race	10	= grid position

second column of every race	10	= race result

R15=retired, but classified NS=did not start (11)=place after practice, but grid position not held free

Place	Name	Country	Team	(United States)		(United States)		(United States)		(United States)		(United States)		(United States)		(United States)		(Canada)		(United States)		(Canada)		(United States)		(United States)		(United States)		(United States)
1	Paul Tracy	Canada	Landford Racing	3	1	1	1	2	1	1	10	1	1	1	1	1	1	2	1	2	R15	1	5	2	1	2	1	5	R10	1	R15
2	Ted Prappas	United States	P.I.G. Racing	7	4	2	R8	9	4	4	5	6	5	6	5	2	2	1	2	2	R11	2	R10	3	R11	8	R12	3	3	2	1
3	Mark Smith	United States	Evergreen Racing	1	2	4	2	12	9	14	R11	7	6	5	4	6	10	8	6	4	R9	3	2	4	R9	4	3	4	5	8	5
4	Robbie Buhl	United States	Leading Edge Motorsport	15	R22	11	13	1	2	9	R18	8	9	10	6	9	4	5	R11	6	2	4	6	1	2	5	2	1	2	3	R16
5	Robbie Groff	United States	Groff Motorsports	4	8	15	6	3	3	11	7	11	R12	7	9	8	R9	(11)	NS	7	R10	-	-	6	3	6	5	2	1	5	3
6	Mike Snow	United States	Bradley Motorsports	26	R20	25	21	8	12	12	3	3	3	3	7	5	3	9	R14	5	8	10	R12	9	6	1	8	6	R9	6	2
7	Mark Rodrigues	United States	Leading Edge Motorsport	16	10	17	18	11	7	15	R19	14	R16	12	11	12	8
7	Mark Rodrigues	United States	McNeill Motorsports															14	9	10	1	12	7	12	5	10	6	7	4	12	R14
8	P. J. Jones	United States	P.I.G. Racing	11	13	6	17	5	5	2	R12	2	2	4	2	3	R12	3	3	1	R12	9	R11	7	R12	11	R13	11	8	4	R13
	Vinicio Salmi	Italy	Genoa Racing	-	-	-	-	-	-	-	-	12	8	-	-	11	R11	4	4	8	3	6	1	-	-	3	10	-	-	7	4
10	Éric Bachelart	Belgium	Ganassi-Stimola Racing ARS	6	3	14	11	4	15	6	2	-	-	2	3	-	-	-	-	-	-	5	R8	-	-	7	4	-	-	-	-
11	Marty Roth	Canada	Stuart Moore Racing	10	5	10	R24	10	16	18	6	13	14	14	14	10	7	11	7	11	4	7	3	5	10	-	-	-	-	-	-
	Tom Christoff	Canada	Landford Racing	18	15	19	15	7	10	13	R13	10	13	11	10	13	6	13	R13	15	6	8	4	11	4	12	9	8	6	11	R12
13	Tommy Byrne	Ireland	Genoa Racing	17	9	3	3	6	6	3	1	5	7	-	-	-	-	-	-	-	-	-	-	-	-	-	-	-	-	-	-
14	Roberto Quintanilla	Mexico	Roquin Motorsports	22	16	12	14	15	11	16	R15	16	11	-	-	-	-	-	-	13	5	11	9	10	7	13	7	-	-	10	6
15	Justin Bell	United Kingdom	Ganassi-Stimola Racing ARS	-	-	16	9	17	13	5	4	-	-	9	8	7	R13	6	10	9	R13	-	-	8	8	-	-	-	-	-	-
16	Cathy Muller	France	McNeill Motorsports	14	12	13	7
16	Cathy Muller	France	Stuart Moore Racing					14	R17	7	R16	9	R15	8	12	4	5	10	5	-	-	-	-	-	-	-	-	-	-	-	-
17	Steve Sheldon	United States	Stuart Moore Racing	8	6	5	4	-	-	-	-	-	-	-	-	-	-
17	Steve Sheldon	United States	McNeill Motorsports															12	R12	-	-	-	-	-	-	-	-	-	-	-	-
18	Hunter Jones	Canada	Baci Racing	2	7	20	12	13	8	8	R17	-	-	-	-	-	-	7	8	-	-	-	-	-	-	-	-	-	-	-	-
19	Johnny O'Connell	United States	R & K Racing	-	-	9	5	-	-	-	-	-	-	-	-	-	-	-	-	-	-	-	-	-	-	-	-	-	-
19	Johnny O'Connell	United States	Essex Racing																											9	7
20	Mitch Thieman	United States	Thieman Racing	20	14	8	R25	-	-	-	-	4	4	-	-	-	-	-	-	-	-	-	-	-	-	-	-	-	-	-	-
21	Colin Trueman	United States	TrueSports Racing	23	18	22	16	-	-	19	9	15	10	13	13	-	-	-	-	-	-	-	-	-	-	-	-	-	-	-	-
22	John Brooks	United States	Baci Racing	-	-	-	-	-	-	-	-	-	-	-	-	-	-	-	-	14	7	-	-	-	-	-	-	-	-	-	-
	Cheryl Glass	United States	Glass Racing	-	-	-	-	-	-	-	-	-	-	-	-	-	-	-	-	-	-	-	-	-	-	-	-	9	7	17	NS
24	Dave Kudrave	United States	Dave White Motorsports	13	11	7	10	-	-	-	-	-	-	-	-	-	-	-	-	-	-	-	-	-	-	-	-	-	-	-	-
	Brian Bonner	United States	TEAMKAR International	-	-	-	-	-	-	17	8	-	-	-	-	-	-	-	-	-	-	-	-	-	-	-	-	-	-	-	-
	John Marconi	United States	Leading Edge Motorsport	-	-	-	-	-	-	-	-	-	-	-	-	-	-	-	-	-	-	-	-	-	-	-	-	-	-	14	8
27	E.J. Lenzi	United States	Baci Racing	-	-	-	23	R22	-	-	-	-	-	-	-	-	-	-	-	-	-	-	-	-	-	9	R11	10	11	-	-
	Mark Ritchey	United States	P.I.G. Racing	-	-	-	-	-	-	-	-	-	-	-	-	-	-	-	-	-	-	-	-	-	-	-	-	-	-	16	9
29	Bob Dorricott Jr.	United States	Cameron-McGee Motorsports	-	-	-	-	-	-	-	-	-	-	-	-	-	-	-	-	-	-	-	-	-	-	-	-	-	-	15	R10
30	Dale Evans	United States	Bradley Motorsports	-	-	-	-	-	-	-	-	-	-	-	-	-	-	-	-	-	-	-	-	-	-	-	-	-	-	13	R11
-	Jay Cochran	United States	Essex Racing	21	R24	18	R23	16	14	10	R14	-	-	-	-	-	-	-	-	-	-	-	-	-	-	-	-	-	-	-	-
-	Rusty Scott	United States	Leading Edge Motorsport	-	-	-	-	-	-	-	-	-	-	-	-	-	-	-	-	12	R14	-	-	-	-	-	-	-	-	-	-
-	Kenji Momota	Japan	TEAMKAR International	24	17	24	20	-	-	-	-	-	-	-	-	-	-	-	-	-	-	-	-	-	-	-	-	-	-	-	-
-	Peter Lockhart	Canada	Leading Edge Motorsport	19	R23	21	19	-	-	-	-	-	-	-	-	-	-	-	-	-	-	-	-	-	-	-	-	-	-	-	-
-	Steve Barclay	United States	R & K Racing	9	R19	-	-	-	-	-	-	-	-	-	-	-	-	-	-	-	-	-	-	-	-	-	-	-	-	-	-
-	Arthur Abrahams	Australia	Baci Racing	12	R21	-	-	-	-	-	-	-	-	-	-	-	-	-	-	-	-	-	-	-	-	-	-	-	-	-	-
