= Toronto Grand Prix =

Toronto Grand Prix may refer to:

== Motorsports ==
Races at Mosport, part of the Greater Toronto Area (GTA)

- Mosport Grand Prix (disambiguation)

Other races

- Grand Prix of Toronto (Molson Indy Toronto), USAC-CART-PPG-Champ-IndyCar race on the streets of Toronto

== Figure skating ==
ISU Grand Prix - Skate Canada International

- 2000 Skate Canada International, in Mississauga, GTA
- 2003 Skate Canada International, in Mississauga, GTA
- 2016 Skate Canada International, in Mississauga, GTA
