= Dean Hall (racing driver) =

American racing driver

Dean Hall (born November 16, 1957, in Palo Alto, California), is a former driver in the CART Championship Car series. He raced in the 1990, 1991 and 1995 seasons with 21 career starts, including the 1990 Indianapolis 500. His best CART finish was in 11th position at the 1990 Cleveland Budweiser Grand Prix and the 1990 Ohio Red Roof Inns 200.

Before moving to CART, Hall was the 1988 West Coast Formula Atlantic Racing champion and the 1989 Formula Pacific champion. He also won the 1989 New Zealand Grand Prix while competing in New Zealand Formula Atlantic.

== Racing record ==
=== American open–wheel racing results ===
(key)

==== Indy Lights ====
Year	Team	1	2	3	4	5	6	7	8	9	10	11	12	Rank	Points
1987	TEAMKAR International	PHX	MIL	MWL	CLE	TOR	POC; 7	MDO	NAZ	LAG	MIA			22nd	6
1989	P.I.G. Racing	PHX; 16	LBH; 6	MIL; 10	DET	POR	MWL	TOR	POC	MDO	ROA	NAZ	LAG	21st	11

==== CART ====
Year	Team	1	2	3	4	5	6	7	8	9	10	11	12	13	14	15	16	17	Rank	Points	Ref
1990	Dale Coyne Racing	PHX; 15	LBH; 18	INDY; 17	MIL; 16	DET; 23	POR; 14	CLE; 11	MEA; 19	TOR; 19	MIS; 23	DEN; 23	VAN; 15	MDO; 11	ROA; 15	NAZ	LS; 21		25th	4	
1991	Leader Card Racing	SRF; 12	LBH	PHX															31st	1	
1991	Kent Baker Racing				INDY; DNQ	MIL	DET	POR	CLE	MEA	TOR	MIS	DEN	VAN	MDO	ROA	NAZ	LS	31st	1	
1995	Dick Simon Racing	MIA; 12	SRF; 12	PHX; 17	LBH; 17	NAZ; 16	INDY; DNQ	MIL	DET	POR	ROA	TOR	CLE	MIS	MDO	NHM	VAN	LS	31st	2	

==== Indianapolis 500 ====
Year	Chassis	Engine	Start	Finish	Team
1990	Lola T90/00	Ford Cosworth DFS	24	17	Dale Coyne Racing
1991	Lola T89/00	Buick	DNQ		Kent Baker Racing
1995	Lola T95/00	Ford XB	DNQ		Dick Simon Racing

Sporting positions
Preceded by Johnny O'Connell	North American Formula Atlantic; Pacific Division Champion; 1988	Succeeded by Hiro Matsushita
Preceded by Paul Radisich	Winner of the New Zealand Grand Prix; 1989	Succeeded by Ken Smith
Preceded by Paul Radisich	Winner of the Lady Wigram Trophy; 1989	Succeeded by Hiro Matsushita
