= Jocko Cunningham =

American racing driver

Joseph Oliver "Jocko" Cunningham (born October 30, 1950) is a former racing driver who competed in the SCCA/ECAR Formula Atlantic series from 1986 to 1990. He finished second in the championship in 1988 and won the championship in 1989. Among his seven race victories was the series' first oval race on the Milwaukee Mile in 1988. His last season in the series was 1990. He currently resides in Harbor Springs, Michigan.

Sporting positions
Preceded by Steve Shelton	North American Formula Atlantic; Atlantic Division Champion; 1989	Succeeded by Brian Till
