= Calvin Fish =

British racing driver

- Nationality: (United Kingdom) British
- Born: Calvin Fish; 22 July 1961 (age 65) Norwich, Norfolk, United Kingdom

Championship titles
- 1987 East: Atlantic Championship

Calvin Fish (born 22 July 1961 in Norwich) is a British television commentator for NBC Sports and a former racing driver.

Fish began his career in karts at 13. He then moved to Formula Ford in 1979 at age 18 and then British Formula Three. He finished fourth in the 1983 British Formula Three Championship and was the only other driver besides Ayrton Senna and Martin Brundle to win a race that year. He then came to the United States and competed in various classes of SCCA competition as well as IMSA GT. He was the 1987 Formula Atlantic champion and then made 14 starts in the Indy Lights series. He returned to sports cars following a good showing at a Roush Racing gong-show shoutout. He was the GTO class winner at the 12 Hours of Sebring and 24 Hours of Daytona in 1990. He drove sporadically until 1995.

Fish is currently an analyst and commentator for NBC Sports on IMSA broadcasts, and for CBS Sports Network on GT World Challenge America broadcasts.

Sporting positions
Preceded by Scott Goodyear	North American Formula Atlantic; Atlantic Division Champion; 1987	Succeeded by Steve Shelton
