= Mosport Grand Prix =

Mosport Grand Prix may refer to:

- Grand Prix of Mosport, IMSA GT prototype sports car race at Mosport
- Canadian Grand Prix, in the 1970s, Formula 1 grand prix
- Canadian motorcycle Grand Prix, in the 1960s, MotoGP grand prix
