= Steve Barclay (racing driver) =

American race car driver (born 1944)

- Nationality: (United States) American
- Born: December 13, 1944 (age 81) Orange, California, U.S.

American Racing Series
- Years active: 1988-1990
- Starts: 13
- Wins: 0
- Poles: 0
- Best finish: 13th in 1988

Steve Barclay (born December 13, 1944) is an American race car driver who competed in the American Racing Series and attempted rookie orientation for the 1990 Indianapolis 500.

== Motorsports Career Results ==
=== American Open-Wheel ===
==== American Racing Series ====
(key)

Year	Team	1	2	3	4	5	6	7	8	9	10	11	12	13	14	Rank	Points
1988	R & K Racing	PIR; 18	MIL; 8	POR; 10	CLE; 12	TOR	MEA; 11	POC; 9	MDO; 9	ROA	NAZ; 8	LAG; 11	MIA			14th	26
1989	R & K Racing	PIR; 6	LB; 11	MIL	DET	POR; 14	MEA	TOR	POC	MDO	ROA	NAZ	LAG			22nd	10
1990	R & K Racing	PIR; 19	LB	MIL	DET	POR	CLE	MEA	TOR	DEN	VAN	MDO	ROA	NAZ	LAG	35th	0
