= Meadowlands Grand Prix =

CART PPG IndyCar World Series
- Location: Meadowlands Sports Complex, East Rutherford, New Jersey
- Corporate sponsor: Marlboro
- First race: 1984
- Last race: 1991
- Distance: 182.55 mi (293.79 km)
- Most wins (driver): Bobby Rahal (3)
- Most wins (team): Newman-Haas Racing (2); Galles Racing (2)
- Most wins (manufacturer): Lola (6)

Circuit information
- Surface: Asphalt
- Length: 1.959 km (1.217 mi)
- Turns: 6
- Lap record: 0:37.219 ( (Brazil) Emerson Fittipaldi, Penske PC-18, 1989, CART)

The Meadowlands Grand Prix was a CART IndyCar race held at the Meadowlands Sports Complex in East Rutherford, New Jersey from 1984 until 1991. The event was the first major auto race in the New York City metropolitan area since the 1937 Vanderbilt Cup, and came with high expectations, including the potential of rivaling the Indianapolis 500 in stature, and crowds of up to 60,000.

The 1988 race saw a late-race battle for the lead between Al Unser Jr. and Emerson Fittipaldi, and in 1989, it was the venue for the final victory for the Cosworth DFX/DFS. However, after eight years, and two separate course layouts, the event was cancelled due to poor attendance and lack of profitability. Both course layouts were criticized, and the event is generally regarded as one of the worst CART races in the series' history.

== History ==
In 1982, Formula One announced a race in the New York City area for the 1983 season. However, the race, which was to take place in Flushing Meadows-Corona Park, was first postponed, then canceled. At the same time, CART and the Meadowlands Sports Complex in East Rutherford, New Jersey, with the help of Long Beach promoter Chris Pook, announced a race for the 1984 season. The race would take place on a 15-turn, 1.682 mi (2.707 km), temporary road course set up in the parking lots around Giants Stadium.

The inaugural event's purse of $536,000 made it the richest race in CART history apart from Indianapolis. The race carried high expectations, was televised nationally, and came on the heels of high-profile successes at former Formula One events in Long Beach and Las Vegas. A crowd of 50,000 was expected. During practice and qualifying, drivers criticized the tight nature of the course. The race began on a damp track, and Mario Andretti led all 100 laps to win. Despite the rainy weather, 34,388 spectators watched the race.

The 1985 event saw better weather and better attendance, but still fell short of expectations. The organizers signed a 3-year contract to continue the race, but the circuit's parking lot nature, giving neither the park-like setting of a natural terrain road course nor the atmosphere of a downtown street race, began to draw criticism from drivers and journalists. In 1988, officials changed the layout to a 1.217 mi (1.959 km) semi-oval layout surrounding Brendan Byrne Arena in an attempt to improve competition and sight lines for spectators, and the race attracted a record 45,025. In addition, new race sponsor Marlboro offered a $1 million bonus for any driver who could win at the Meadowlands, Michigan, and the Marlboro Challenge in Miami in the same season; no driver ever won the bonus. In the 1988 race, Al Unser Jr. and Emerson Fittipaldi touched while battling for the lead, and Fittipaldi veered into a bank of tire barriers. Unser Jr. went on to win.

In the 1989 event, Bobby Rahal scored his only victory of the season. It was the lone victory for the "short stroke" Cosworth DFS, and the 153rd and final race win for the Cosworth DFX/DFS in Indy car racing. The race was halted five laps early due to heavy rain and standing water on the course. Rahal held off points leader Emerson Fittipaldi for the victory.

In 1990, Michael Andretti led 105 of the 150 laps en route to victory, in a crash-filled race. Bobby Rahal and Mario Andretti tangled and crashed on lap 41, while Arie Luyendyk ran into a tire barrier trying to lap Dominic Dobson. Later, Luyendyk missed the turn into turn one, and veered off onto an escape road. He had to drive up an exit ramp and into the Giants Stadium parking lot to turn around and return to the race course. The 1991 race saw Bobby Rahal win his first CART race in nearly two years.

The 1991 race was the final Meadowlands Grand Prix. Despite the layout revisions and increasing purses, attendance dipped and the race failed to turn a profit. The promoters considered moving the event to Washington, D. C., Miami, or a permanent circuit that would be built using the drag strip, return roads, and pit sections of Old Bridge Township Raceway Park in Englishtown, New Jersey, 70 kilometers away from East Rutherford. The race was eventually scheduled for 1992 on a circuit in Manhattan on the roads surrounding the World Trade Center and West Street. However, it was postponed until 1993 then cancelled due to cost and conflicts between sponsor Marlboro and Mayor David Dinkins' anti-tobacco advertising policies.

== Lap records ==
The fastest official race lap records at the Meadowlands Grand Prix are listed as:

Category	Time	Driver	Vehicle	Event	Track Map
Grand Prix Circuit (1988–1991): 1.217 mi (1.959 km)
CART	0:37.219	Emerson Fittipaldi	Penske PC-18	1989 Marlboro Grand Prix	
Indy Lights	0:41.776	Jon Beekhuis	Wildcat-Buick	1988 Meadowlands Indy Lights round	
IMSA GTO	0:45.109	Pete Halsmer	Mazda RX-7	1990 Grand Prix of the Meadowlands	
Trans-Am	0:46.122	Willy T. Ribbs	Chevrolet Camaro	1988 Meadowlands Trans-Am round	
IMSA GTU	0:48.452	David Loring	Nissan 240SX	1990 Grand Prix of the Meadowlands	
IMSA AAC	0:51.062	Clay Young	Chevrolet Beretta	1990 Grand Prix of the Meadowlands	
Original Circuit (1984–1987): 1.682 mi (2.707 km)
CART	1:00.535	Mario Andretti	March 86C	1986 Chase Grand Prix	
Indy Lights	1:05.717	Fabrizio Barbazza	Wildcat-Buick	1986 Meadowlands Indy Lights round	

== Race winners ==
Year	Date	Winning driver	Chassis	Engine	Team	Race title	Report
1984	July 1	(United States) Mario Andretti	Lola	Cosworth	Newman-Haas Racing	Meadowlands Grand Prix	Report
1985	June 30	(United States) Al Unser Jr.	Lola	Cosworth	Doug Shierson Racing	Meadowlands United States Grand Prix	Report
1986	June 29	(United States) Danny Sullivan	March	Cosworth	Penske Racing	Chase Grand Prix at the Meadowlands	Report
1987	June 28	(United States) Bobby Rahal	Lola	Cosworth	Truesports	Meadowlands Indy	Report
1988	July 24	(United States) Al Unser Jr.	March	Cosworth	Galles Racing	Marlboro Grand Prix at the Meadowlands	Report
1989	July 16	(United States) Bobby Rahal	Lola	Cosworth	Kraco Racing	Marlboro Grand Prix	Report
1990	July 15	(United States) Michael Andretti	Lola	Chevrolet	Newman-Haas Racing	Marlboro Grand Prix at the Meadowlands	Report
1991	July 14	(United States) Bobby Rahal	Lola	Chevrolet	Galles Racing	Marlboro Grand Prix	Report

=== ARS/Indy Lights winners ===
Year	Date	Winning driver
1986	June 29	(Italy) Fabrizio Barbazza
1987	June 28	(Belgium) Didier Theys
1988	July 24	(Switzerland) Jon Beekhuis
1989	July 16	(United States) Mike Groff
1990	July 15	(Canada) Paul Tracy
1991	July 14	(Belgium) Éric Bachelart

=== Trans-Am winners ===
Year	Winning driver Winning car
1988	(West Germany) Hans-Joachim Stuck; Audi 200 quattro

=== IMSA GT winners ===
Year	GTO winning driver GTO winning car	GTU winning driver GTU winning car	AAC winning driver AAC winning car
1990	(United States) Robby Gordon; Mercury Cougar XR-7	(United States) David Loring; Nissan 240SX	(United States) Clay Young; Chevrolet Beretta
