= Steve Shelton =

American racing driver

Steve Shelton (born May 16, 1949) is an American former racing driver from Fort Lauderdale, Florida. He raced in the SCCA/ECAR Formula Atlantic Championship from 1985 to 1990. He won in his first start which was that particular incarnation of the Atlantic series' first race. He captured five race wins and won the 1988 championship. Shelton still holds the record for most pole positions in Formula Atlantic history with 14.

Sporting positions
Preceded by Calvin Fish	North American Formula Atlantic; Atlantic Division Champion; 1988	Succeeded by Jocko Cunningham
