= Vinicio Salmi =

Italian motorcycle racer (born 1956)

- Nationality: Italian
Motorcycle racing career statistics
Grand Prix motorcycle racing
Active years	1977
First race	1977 250cc German Grand Prix
Last race	1977 250cc Spanish Grand Prix
Starts / Wins / Podiums / Poles / F. laps / Points; 3 / 0 / 0 / 0 / 0 / 8

Vinicio Salmi (born 3 July 1956) is an Italian former Grand Prix motorcycle road racer and racing driver from Ferrara.

Salmi competed in the 1977 250cc motorcycle road racing world championship on a Yamaha. His best result was a fourth-place finish at the 1977 250cc German Grand Prix held at the Hockenheimring circuit.

Salmi competed in the FIA European Formula Three Championship part-time from 1979 to 1981 and Italian Formula Three in 1981. He raced motorcycles from 1982 until 1988. In 1989, he returned to professional racing in the American Racing Series which would later be known as Indy Lights. In 1990, he captured a win in Vancouver and finished ninth in series points despite missing the first four races of the season. He entered for the 1991 Indianapolis 500, but never appeared on track. In 1992, he competed in a partial road course season in the CART Indy Car World Series for Euromotorsport using an outdated Lola chassis. His best finish was 15th place at Road America and he scored no championship points. Little has been heard of him after his CART experience.

== Racing record ==
=== American open-wheel racing ===
(key)

==== PPG Indy Car World Series ====
Year	Team	1	2	3	4	5	6	7	8	9	10	11	12	13	14	15	16	Pos.	Pts	Ref
1992	Euromotorsport	SRF	PHX	LBH	INDY	DET	POR; 18	MIL	NHA	TOR; 20	MCH	CLE	ROA; 15	VAN; 20	MDO	NAZ	LAG; 24	44th	0	
