= Giupponi =

Giupponi is both a surname and a given name. Notable people with the name include:

- Flavio Giupponi (born 1964), Italian cyclist
- Matteo Giupponi (born 1988), Italian racewalker
- Giupponi Franca, Brazilian racing driver
