= 1988 Champ Car season =

The 1988 Champ Car season may refer to:

- the 1987–88 USAC Championship Car season, which was just one race, the 72nd Indianapolis 500
- the 1988 CART PPG Indy Car World Series, sanctioned by CART, who later became Champ Car
