= 1988 CART PPG Indy Car World Series =

American motorsport season

1988 CART season
- PPG Indy Car World Series

Season
- Races: 16
- Start date: April 10
- End date: November 6

Awards
- Drivers' champion: (United States) Danny Sullivan
- Constructors' Cup: (United Kingdom) Lola
- Manufacturers' Cup: (United States) Chevrolet
- Nations' Cup: United States
- Rookie of the Year: (Canada) John Jones
- Indianapolis 500 winner: (United States) Rick Mears

The 1988 CART PPG Indy Car World Series season was the 10th national championship season of American open wheel racing sanctioned by CART. The season consisted of 15 races, and one non-points exhibition event. Danny Sullivan was the national champion, winning for Team Penske. The rookie of the year was John Jones. The 1988 Indianapolis 500 was sanctioned by USAC, but counted towards the CART points championship. Rick Mears won the Indy 500, his third victory at Indy.

The 1988 season was the breakout year for the Ilmor Chevrolet Indy V-8 engine. After being introduced in 1986, and earning its first victory in 1987, the Ilmor Chevy dominated the series in 1988, and established itself as the best powerplant on the circuit. Chevy won 14 of the 15 races, and all 15 pole positions. Along the way, the Ilmor Chevy earned its first victory at Indianapolis in 1988, with Rick Mears winning from the pole.

== Season recap ==
Danny Sullivan won four races, nine pole positions, and had 11 top five finishes en route to the championship title. Sullivan got off to a slow start, but at Indy, he and his Penske teammates (Rick Mears and Al Unser) dominated the month of May. The Penske team swept all three spots on the front row, and led 192 of the 200 laps. Sullivan himself qualified second and dominated the first half of the race. He dropped out just beyond the halfway point when a wing adjuster failed and sent his car into the wall. He rebounded over the next six races, posting two wins and no finish worse than 4th.

Sullivan's nearest competitors during the season were Al Unser Jr. and Bobby Rahal. Unser Jr. left Doug Shierson Racing after a winless 1987 campaign and returned to Galles Racing for 1988, and also got use of the coveted Chevrolet engine. Unser won at Long Beach and Toronto, then won a controversial race at the Meadowlands. Battling for the lead in the late stages of the race, he tangled with Emerson Fittipaldi, sending Fittipaldi into the tire barrier.

Back-to-back defending CART champion, and 1986 Indy winner Bobby Rahal returned for his last season at Truesports. The team dropped the Cosworth DFX and the took up development of the Judd AV engine. The engine was known to be down on horsepower, but excelled in fuel mileage and reliability, particularly in the 500-mile races. Rahal finished 4th at Indy, second at the Michigan 500, and won the Pocono 500. His ten top five finishes kept him in contention for the title, but with only one win, he was struggling to keep pace with the Chevy-powered teams.

After winning the Michigan 500, Danny Sullivan took the points lead for the first time all year. The lead was short-lived, however, as he wrecked at Pocono. Rahal and Unser Jr. finished 1–2 at Pocono, and the top three in the standings were separated by only 5 points with five races remaining.

At Mid-Ohio, Rahal crashed out, and his title hopes began to fade. Sullivan and Unser were separated by 1 point with four races to go. All three drivers finished strong at Road America, and the championship battle pushed on. The turning point of the season came at Nazareth. Al Unser Jr. blew his engine, Rahal was not a factor, but Sullivan dominated. Sullivan started from the pole, and led the final 74 laps to score a crucial victory. With only two races left, Sullivan had a commanding 25-point lead. At the second-to-last race of the season at Laguna Seca, Sullivan pulled out a hat trick by winning the pole, leading the most laps, and winning the race. With still one race left, Sullivan clinched the 1988 CART title, holding an insurmountable 35-point lead. It was Sullivan's first and only championship title and Penske's first since 1985.

With the championship decided for Sullivan, the season finale at Miami became a race to see who would finish second in points. Rahal held an 8-point lead over Al Unser Jr., with Mario Andretti and Rick Mears also lurking in 4th and 5th, respectively. Unser Jr. dominated the race, leading 82 (of 112) laps and winning for the second time at the Tamiami Park circuit. Rahal blew an engine, Mario Andretti dropped out, and Mears finished second. The results saw a shake up in the standings, with Unser Jr. finishing second in points, Rahal third, and Mears slipping ahead of Andretti by 3 points for 4th and 5th.

Other stories from 1988 included A. J. Foyt returning to a full-time schedule (from 1980 to 1987, he only ran a partial schedule), and the Porsche Indy car team expanding to full-time with driver Teo Fabi. Rookie John Andretti suffered a devastating crash at the Pocono 500, but would recover before the end of the season. Jim Crawford, who suffered serious leg injuries in a crash in 1987, returned to the cockpit with a notable run at Indianapolis where he led 8 laps and finished 6th, the best result to-date for the Buick V-6 engine.

Another story was the continued downward spiral of March. After Portland the Patrick Racing Team changed from the latest March to a Lola fleet which consisted of the current model and a year old Lola.

== Drivers and constructors ==
The following teams and drivers competed for the 1988 Indy Car World Series. All cars used Goodyear tires.

Team	Chassis	Engine	No	Drivers	Rounds
Full-time
(United States) Newman/Haas Racing	Lola T8800	Chevrolet	6	(United States) Mario Andretti	All
(United States) Patrick Racing	March 88C	Chevrolet	20	(Brazil) Emerson Fittipaldi	1–5
(United States) Patrick Racing	Lola T8700; Lola T8800	Chevrolet	20	(Brazil) Emerson Fittipaldi	6–15
(United States) Galles Racing	March 88C	Chevrolet (2–8, 10–15) Cosworth (1,9)	3	(United States) Al Unser Jr.	All
(United States) Team Penske	Penske PC-17	Chevrolet	5	(United States) Rick Mears	All
(United States) Team Penske	Penske PC-17	Chevrolet	9	(United States) Danny Sullivan	All
(United States) Team Penske	Penske PC-17	Chevrolet	1	(United States) Al Unser	3
(United States) Team Penske	Penske PC-17	Chevrolet	60	(United States) Al Unser	9–10
(United States) Porsche North America	Porsche 2708	Porsche	8	(Italy) Teo Fabi	All
(United States) Truesports	Lola T8800	Judd (1–7, 9–15) Cosworth (8)	1/4	(United States) Bobby Rahal	All
(United States) Kraco Racing	March 88C	Cosworth	18	(United States) Michael Andretti	1–9
(United States) Kraco Racing	Lola	Cosworth	18	(United States) Michael Andretti	10–15
(United States) Doug Shierson Racing	March	Cosworth	30	(Brazil) Raul Boesel	1–2, 4–5
(United States) Doug Shierson Racing	Lola	Cosworth	30	(Brazil) Raul Boesel	3, 6–15
(United States) Raynor Racing	Lola	Cosworth	10	(Republic of Ireland) Derek Daly	All
(United States) Arciero Racing	March	Cosworth	12	(Canada) John Jones	All
(United States) Vince Granatelli Racing	Lola/March	Cosworth	2/4	(Colombia) Roberto Guerrero	All except 7–8
(United States) Vince Granatelli Racing	Lola/March	Cosworth	2/4	(United States) Al Unser	7–8
(United States) Vince Granatelli Racing	Lola/March	Cosworth	58/71/85	(United States) Gordon Johncock	3, 9–10
(United States) Machinists Union Racing	March	Cosworth	11	(United States) Kevin Cogan	All except 8–11
(United States) Machinists Union Racing	March	Cosworth	11	(United States) Scott Pruett	8, 11
(United States) Machinists Union Racing	March	Cosworth	55	(United States) Scott Atchison	All except 3, 13
(United States) Machinists Union Racing	March	Cosworth	29/11	(United States) Rich Vogler	3, 9–10
(United States) Machinists Union Racing	March	Buick	28	(United States) Pancho Carter	3
(United States) Dick Simon Racing	Lola	Cosworth	7	(Netherlands) Arie Luyendyk	All
(United States) Dick Simon Racing	Lola	Cosworth	22	(United States) Dick Simon	1, 3–4, 9–10, 13
(United States) Dick Simon Racing	Lola	Cosworth	22	(United States) Scott Pruett	2
(United States) Dick Simon Racing	Lola	Cosworth	22	(Belgium) Didier Theys	5–8, 11–12, 14–15
(United States) Dick Simon Racing	Lola	Cosworth	23	(Italy) Fulvio Ballabio	2, 11–12
(United States) Dick Simon Racing	Lola	Cosworth	23	(Finland) Tero Palmroth	3, 5
(United States) Dick Simon Racing	Lola	Cosworth	23	(Switzerland) Jean-Pierre Frey	14–15
(United States) A. J. Foyt Enterprises	Lola	Cosworth	14	(United States) A. J. Foyt	All except 9
(United States) A. J. Foyt Enterprises	Lola	Cosworth	14	(United States) Johnny Rutherford	9
(United States) A. J. Foyt Enterprises	March	Cosworth	48	(United States) Rocky Moran	3
(United States) A. J. Foyt Enterprises	March	Chevrolet	84	(United States) Stan Fox	3
(United States) Bettenhausen Motorsports	Lola/March	Cosworth/Judd	16	(United States) Tony Bettenhausen Jr.	All except 5 and 15
(United States) Bettenhausen Motorsports	Lola/March	Cosworth/Judd	16	(United States) Dennis Vitolo	15
(United States) Alex Morales Motorsports	March	Cosworth	21	(United States) Howdy Holmes	All
(United States) Hemelgarn Racing	Lola	Judd/Cosworth/Buick	91	(United States) Scott Brayton	All except 11-12 and 14
(United States) Hemelgarn Racing	Lola	Judd/Cosworth/Buick	71	(Canada) Ludwig Heimrath Jr.	2–3, 5–8, 11–12, 15
(United States) Hemelgarn Racing	Lola	Judd/Cosworth/Buick	71	(United States) Ken Johnson	14
(United States) Hemelgarn Racing	Lola	Judd/Cosworth/Buick	81/71	(United States) Tom Sneva	3, 9
(United States) Gohr Racing	March	Cosworth	56	(United States) Rocky Moran	2, 5–8, 11–12, 14–15
(United States) Gohr Racing	March	Cosworth	56	(United States) Bill Vukovich III	1, 3, 9–10
(United States) Curb Racing	Lola	Cosworth	98	(United States) John Andretti	All except 11-12 and 14–15
(United States) Leader Card Racing	Lola	Cosworth	24	(United States) Randy Lewis	All except 13
(United States) Leader Card Racing	Lola	Cosworth	16	(United States) Dominic Dobson	5
Part-time
(United States) Dobson Motorsports	Lola	Cosworth	17/92	(United States) Dominic Dobson	3, 14
(United States) Dale Coyne Racing	March	Chevrolet	19	(United States) Dale Coyne	3–11, 13–15
(United States) Dale Coyne Racing	March	Chevrolet	19	(United States) Dominic Dobson	2
(United States) Los Angeles Drywall	March	Cosworth	27	(United States) Dick Ferguson	2
(United States) Los Angeles Drywall	March	Cosworth	27	(United States) Ed Pimm	3
(United States) Bernstein Racing	Lola	Buick	15	(United Kingdom) Jim Crawford	3
(United States) Bernstein Racing	Lola	Buick	17	(United States) Johnny Rutherford	3
(United States) KargoStopper	Lola	Cosworth	88	(United States) Darin Brassfield	11, 14
(United States) BDR Racing	March	Cosworth	43	(United States) Steve Bren	14
(United States) Gary Trout Motorsports	March	Cosworth	33	(United States) Steve Chassey	3
(United States) Gary Trout Motorsports	March	Cosworth	33	(United States) Ed Pimm	11-12
(United States) Andale Racing	March	Cosworth	69	(Mexico) Bernard Jourdain	14–15
(United States) U.S. Engineering	March	Cosworth	77	(United States) Phil Krueger	6, 9–10
(United States) Kent Baker Racing	March	Cosworth	97	(United States) Phil Krueger	3
(United States) Scheid Tire Centers	March	Cosworth	46	(United States) Gary Bettenhausen	3
(United States) Calumet Farms	March	Chevrolet	84	(United States) George Snider	3
(Brazil) GF Racing	March	Cosworth	25	(Brazil) Giupponi Franca	11, 14
(Brazil) GF Racing	March	Cosworth	25	(Brazil) José Romano	12, 15
(United States) Indiana Carbon	March	Cosworth	87	(United States) Spike Gehlhausen	3
(United States) Mergard	March	Cosworth	36	(United States) Harry Sauce	3
(United States) Performers, Inc.	March	Cosworth	77	(United States) Tom Bigelow	3

== Schedule ==
Icon	Legend
O	Oval/Speedway
R	Road course
S	Street circuit
NC	Non-championship race

Rd	Date	Race Name	Track	City
1	April 10	Checker 200	O Phoenix International Raceway	Phoenix, Arizona
2	April 17	Toyota Grand Prix of Long Beach	S Long Beach Street Circuit	Long Beach, California
3	May 29	Indianapolis 500*	O Indianapolis Motor Speedway	Speedway, Indiana
4	June 5	Miller High Life 200	O Milwaukee Mile	West Allis, Wisconsin
5	June 19	Budweiser/G.I. Joe's 200	R Portland International Raceway	Portland, Oregon
6	July 3	Budweiser Cleveland Grand Prix	S Burke Lakefront Airport	Cleveland, Ohio
7	July 17	Molson Indy Toronto	S Exhibition Place	Toronto, Ontario
8	July 24	Marlboro Grand Prix	S Meadowlands Street Circuit	East Rutherford, New Jersey
9	August 7	Marlboro 500	O Michigan International Speedway	Brooklyn, Michigan
10	August 21	Quaker State 500	O Pocono International Raceway	Long Pond, Pennsylvania
11	September 4	Escort Radar Warning 200	R Mid-Ohio Sports Car Course	Lexington, Ohio
12	September 11	Briggs & Stratton 200	R Road America	Elkhart Lake, Wisconsin
13	September 25	Bosch Spark Plug Grand Prix	O Pennsylvania International Raceway	Lehigh Valley, Pennsylvania
14	October 16	Nissan Monterey Grand Prix	R Laguna Seca Raceway	Monterey, California
NC	November 5	Marlboro Challenge	S Tamiami Park	Miami, Florida
15	November 6	Nissan Indy Challenge	S Tamiami Park	Miami, Florida

* Indianapolis was USAC-sanctioned but counted towards the CART title.

== Results ==
Rnd	Race Name	Pole position	Winning driver	Winning team	Race time	Report
1	Checker 200	(United States) Rick Mears	(United States) Mario Andretti	Newman/Haas Racing	1:38:22	Report
2	Long Beach Grand Prix	(United States) Danny Sullivan	(United States) Al Unser Jr.	Galles Racing	1:53:47	Report
3	Indianapolis 500	(United States) Rick Mears	(United States) Rick Mears	Team Penske	3:27:10	Report
4	Miller High Life 200	(United States) Michael Andretti	(United States) Rick Mears	Team Penske	1:37:42	Report
5	Budweiser/G. I. Joe's 200	(United States) Danny Sullivan	(United States) Danny Sullivan	Team Penske	1:57:17	Report
6	Budweiser Grand Prix of Cleveland	(United States) Danny Sullivan	(United States) Mario Andretti	Newman/Haas Racing	1:35:46	Report
7	Molson Indy Toronto	(United States) Danny Sullivan	(United States) Al Unser Jr.	Galles Racing	1:59:34	Report
8	Meadowlands Grand Prix	(Brazil) Emerson Fittipaldi	(United States) Al Unser Jr.	Galles Racing	1:50:14	Report
9	Marlboro 500	(United States) Rick Mears	(United States) Danny Sullivan	Team Penske	2:46:03	Report
10	Quaker State 500	(United States) Rick Mears	(United States) Bobby Rahal	Truesports	3:44:21	Report
11	Escort Radar Warning 200	(United States) Danny Sullivan	(Brazil) Emerson Fittipaldi	Patrick Racing	2:14:18	Report
12	Briggs & Stratton 200	(United States) Danny Sullivan	(Brazil) Emerson Fittipaldi	Patrick Racing	1:38:11	Report
13	Bosch Spark Plug Grand Prix	(United States) Danny Sullivan	(United States) Danny Sullivan	Team Penske	1:20:47	Report
14	Champion Spark Plug 300	(United States) Danny Sullivan	(United States) Danny Sullivan	Team Penske	1:58:35	Report
NC	Marlboro Challenge	(United States) Danny Sullivan	(United States) Michael Andretti	Kraco Racing	0:48:52	Report
15	Nissan Indy Challenge	(United States) Danny Sullivan	(United States) Al Unser Jr.	Galles Racing	1:58:08	Report

=== Final driver standings ===
Pos	Driver	PHX	LBH	INDY	MIL	POR	CLE	TOR	MEA	MIS	POC	MOH	ROA	NAZ	LAG	MAR	TAM	Pts
1	(United States) Danny Sullivan	23	**13**	23*	2	**1**	**3***	**2**	4	1	18	**5**	**4**	**1**	**1***	**8**	**5**	182
2	(United States) Al Unser Jr.	18	1*	13	20	4	4	1*	1	21	2	4	7	19	6	4	1*	149
3	(United States) Bobby Rahal	16	2	5	6	12	2	5	5	2	1	18	2	12	4	7	18	136
4	(United States) Rick Mears	**22**	8	**1**	1*	6	23	6	3	**13***	**23**	3	12	7*	5	5	2	129
5	(United States) Mario Andretti	1*	15	20	17	5	1	25	2	12	17	2	3	3	3	6	15	126
6	(United States) Michael Andretti	3	7	4	**7**	11	14	3	6	3	25	26	5	2	2	1*	17	119
7	(Brazil) Emerson Fittipaldi	21	16	2	3	3	19	4	**14***	19	21	1*	1*	8	16	2	20	105
8	(Brazil) Raul Boesel	5	4	7	4	26	5	8	9	11	5	6	14	5	21	3	22	89
9	(Republic of Ireland) Derek Daly	13	5	29	11	19	6	23	24	16	4	9	6	10	7	10	23	53
10	(Italy) Teo Fabi	7	24	28	9	7	24	10	18	25	24	8	8	4	10		21	44
11	(Canada) John Jones RY	20	12	DNQ	14	8	7	7	7	8	8	7	13	11	11		16	44
12	(Colombia) Roberto Guerrero	2	19	32	Wth	14	20			20	3	11	22	6	14		26	40
13	(United States) Kevin Cogan	8	3	11	22	20	10	24					24	15	9		4	40
14	(Netherlands) Arie Luyendyk	9	10	10	15	2*	18	20	20	28	26	25	19	9	22		14	31
15	(Belgium) Didier Theys					10	9	18	21			10	23		8		3	29
16	(United States) A. J. Foyt	4	11	26	5	15	11	15	17		16	22	10	17	24		25	29
17	(United States) Tony Bettenhausen Jr.	6	Wth	33	19		15	17	8	4	15	16	16	13	26			25
18	(United States) Howdy Holmes	10	17	12	8	16	13	11	23	23	7	14	11	14	23		8	24
19	(United States) Al Unser			3				9	19	9	13*					9		23
20	(United States) Scott Atchison R	12	9	DNQ	16	25	12	13	10	10	12	15	20	Wth	25		9	17
21	(United States) Gordon Johncock			DNQ						6	6							16
22	(United States) Phil Krueger			8			17			5	22							15
23	(United States) Scott Brayton	15	23	31	10	9	16	14	11	26	10			18			24	12
24	(United States) Dick Simon	19		9	12					7	19			20				11
25	(United States) Rocky Moran		6	16		13	22	12	15			13	17		28		13	9
26	(Mexico) Bernard Jourdain R														20		6	8
27	(United Kingdom) Jim Crawford			6														8
28	(Canada) Ludwig Heimrath Jr.		14	25		23	26	19	12			19	21				7	7
29	(United States) Randy Lewis	17	21	15	21	22	21	21	13	14	20	21	9		15		10	7
30	(United States) Bill Vukovich III R	11		14						17	9							6
31	(United States) John Andretti	14	20	21	18	17	8	22	25	24	14			16				5
32	(United States) Rich Vogler			17						15	11							2
33	(United States) Dennis Vitolo R																11	2
34	(United States) Dale Coyne	Wth		Wth	13	24	25	16	22	27	DNQ	24	DNQ	DNQ	27		12	1
35	(United States) Ed Pimm			DNQ								12	15					1
36	(United States) Ken Johnson R														12			1
37	(Switzerland) Jean-Pierre Frey R														13		19	0
38	(United States) Scott Pruett R		18						16			20						0
39	(Italy) Fulvio Ballabio		25									17	18					0
40	(United States) Steve Bren														17			0
41	(United States) Dominic Dobson		26	18		21									18			0
42	(Finland) Tero Palmroth R			19		18												0
43	(United States) Johnny Rutherford			22						18								0
44	(United States) Darin Brassfield											23			19			0
45	(United States) Tom Sneva			27						22								0
46	(United States) Dick Ferguson		22															0
47	(United States) Steve Chassey			24														0
48	(United States) Stan Fox			30														0
	(Brazil) Giupponi Franca											DNQ			DNQ			0
	(Brazil) José Romano												DNQ				DNQ	0
	(United States) Gary Bettenhausen			DNQ														0
	(United States) Tom Bigelow			DNQ														0
	(United States) Pancho Carter			DNQ														0
	(United States) Spike Gehlhausen			DNQ														0
	(United States) Johnny Parsons			DNQ														0
	(United States) Harry Sauce			Wth														0
	(United States) George Snider			Wth														0
Pos	Driver	PHX	LBH	INDY	MIL	POR	CLE	TOR	MEA	MIS	POC	MOH	ROA	NAZ	LAG	MAR	TAM	Pts

Color	Result
Gold	Winner
Silver	2nd place
Bronze	3rd place
Green	4th-6th place
Light Blue	7th-12th place
Dark Blue	Finished (Outside Top 12)
Purple	Did not finish
Red	Did not qualify (DNQ)
Brown	Withdrawn (Wth)
Black	Disqualified (DSQ)
White	Did not start (DNS)
Blank	Did not participate (DNP)
Blank	Not competing

**In-line notation**
**Bold**	Pole position
Italics	Ran fastest race lap
*	Led most race laps
RY	Rookie of the Year
R	Rookie

=== Nations' Cup ===
- Top result per race counts towards Nations' Cup.

Pos	Country	Pts
1	United States	317
2	Brazil	158
3	Italy	52
4	Canada	50
5	(Republic of Ireland) Ireland	45
6	Colombia	40
7	Netherlands	31
8	Belgium	29
9	Mexico	8
10	England	8
11	Switzerland	0
12	Finland	0
Pos	Country	Pts

=== Chassis Constructors' Cup ===
Pos	Chassis	Pts
1	(United Kingdom) Lola T8800/T8700	248
2	(United States) Penske PC-17	231
3	(United Kingdom) March 88C/87C/86C/85C	222
Pos	Chassis	Pts

=== Engine Manufacturers' Cup ===
Pos	Engine	Pts
1	(United States) Chevrolet A	320
2	(United Kingdom) Cosworth	206
3	(United Kingdom) Judd	131
4	(Germany) Porsche	44
5	(United States) Buick	8
Pos	Engine	Pts

== See also ==
- 1988 Indianapolis 500
- 1988 American Racing Series season
