= Porsche 928 =

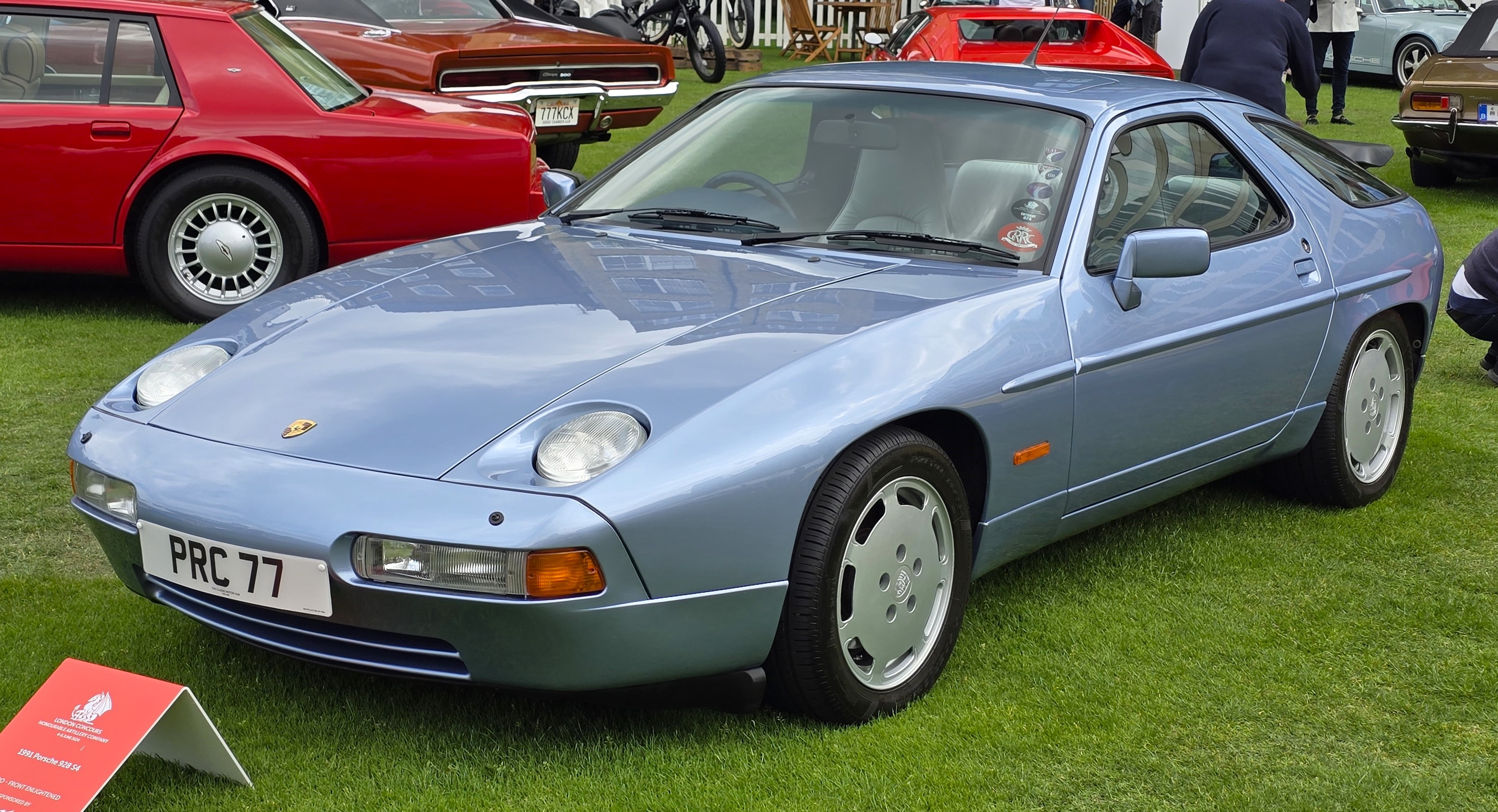
- 1991 Porsche 928 S4

Overview
- Manufacturer: Porsche AG
- Production: May 1977–1995; 61,056 produced
- Assembly: Germany: Zuffenhausen
- Designer: Wolfgang Möbius; Anatole Lapine

Body and chassis
- Class: Grand tourer (S)
- Body style: 2-door 2+2 liftback coupé
- Layout: Front-engine, rear-wheel-drive

Powertrain
- Engine: 4.5 L M28/01–M28/18 V8; 4.7 L M28/19–M28/22 V8; 5.0 L M28/41–M28/47 DOHC V8; 5.4 L M28/49–M28/50 DOHC V8; Note
- Transmission: 5-speed manual; 3-speed automatic; 4-speed automatic

Dimensions
- Wheelbase: 2,500 mm (98.4 in)
- Length: 4,520 mm (178.0 in); 1988–1995: 4,524 mm (178.1 in)
- Width: 1987–1992: 1,837 mm (72.3 in); 1993–1995: 1,890 mm (74.4 in)
- Height: Pre-1989: 1,275 mm (50.2 in); 1990–1995: 1,282 mm (50.5 in)
- Curb weight: 1,450–1,620 kg (3,197–3,571 lb)

The Porsche 928 is a grand touring car which was manufactured and marketed by Porsche AG of Germany from 1977 to 1995 across a single generation with an intermediate facelift. It is a 2+2 coupé with a rear hatchback. The 928 has a water-cooled engine which is mounted in the front and drives the rear wheels. It was Porsche's first production car with a V8 engine.

Initially conceived to address changes in the automotive market, it represented Porsche's first fully in-house design for a production vehicle and was intended to potentially replace the Porsche 911 as the company's flagship model. The 928 aimed to blend the performance and handling characteristics of a sports car with the comfort, spaciousness, and ride quality of a luxury car. Porsche executives believed that the 928 would have broader appeal compared to the compact, somewhat outdated, and slow-selling air-cooled 911.

The 928 earned recognition upon its 1978 release by winning the European Car of the Year award, one of the few occasions that the prize did not go to a mass-produced family car.

== Conception ==
In the late 1960s, Porsche had solidified its reputation as a manufacturer of high-performance sports cars. Amidst the 1970s oil crisis, there were discussions among executives regarding the potential addition of a more fuel-efficient luxury touring car to the company's lineup. Managing director Ernst Fuhrmann advocated for the development of this new model, expressing concerns about the 911, Porsche's flagship model at the time, nearing its performance limits. Fuhrmann believed that expanding into grand touring cars with conventional engines could be essential for the company's future, contrasting with the unconventional sports cars like the 911. The declining sales of the 911 in the mid-1970s suggested a possible downturn in its market appeal. Fuhrmann envisioned the new range-topping grand tourer as a blend of sports coupé and luxury sedan, distinguishing it from the 911 with its more utilitarian interior and pure sports car performance. In the view to please the very important USA market, it switched to front-engined, V8 power and a more spacious interior that included two real child seats (rather than the dog seats in the 911). The goal was to create a model that could compete with offerings from Mercedes-Benz and BMW while also appealing to the American market, which was Porsche's primary market at the time.

Ordered by Ferdinand Porsche to develop a production-feasible concept for the new model, Fuhrmann commenced a design study in 1971, resulting in the creation of the 928. This model marked Porsche's first clean-sheet design for its own model. Previous Porsche models had been iterations or collaborations: the 356 bore similarities to the Volkswagen Beetle, the 911 evolved from the 356, the 914 was a joint venture aimed at replacing the Volkswagen Karmann Ghia and 912, and the 924 stemmed from a discontinued Volkswagen and Audi project.

Various drivetrain layouts were considered during early development, including rear- and mid-engine configurations, but many were dismissed due to technical and regulatory challenges. Issues with emissions and noise control, similar to those experienced with the 911, arose from cramming the engine, transmission, catalytic converter(s), and exhaust into a small rear engine bay. After determining that the mid-engine layout lacked sufficient space in the passenger compartment, Porsche opted for a front-engine, rear-wheel drive configuration.

Porsche engineers sought a large-displacement engine for the 928, and prototype units were initially equipped with a 5-liter V8 engine producing 300 PS (220 kW; 300 hp). There were discussions about utilizing a 4.6-liter 90-degree V10 engine with 88 mm bore spacing, which was a derivative of the Audi 5-cylinder engine (also used in the Lamborghini Gallardo) and based on the Volkswagen EA827 unit. However, this proposal faced objections from the Porsche board due to concerns that it might lead to rumors of a new 911 model with a front-mounted Volkswagen-based engine. Additionally, it is speculated that the board aimed to maintain some separation from the Volkswagen Group.

The resulting all-alloy M28 engine incorporated several distinctive features. Its bore spacing was 122 mm, indicating the use of thick, all-aluminum cylinder barrels without steel liners. The water jackets were notably large, hinting at the engine's potential for racing applications. To maintain a low hood line, the engine prioritized airflow, resulting in the placement of spark plugs at the top of the head. The four-bolt bearings were substantial and received oil via grooves in the block's bottom surface. They were supported by a large one-piece structure forming a lower block, with the cast aluminum oil pan bolted onto this component.

The oil and water pumps were driven by a timing belt. In 1985, DOHC engines introduced a hybrid timing system where the timing belt operated only the exhaust camshafts, while the intake camshafts were driven via an internally-mounted simplex roller chain from the exhaust camshaft. This approach simplified the timing belt layout, requiring fewer components and leading to easier and less costly maintenance. This timing system was later adopted by Porsche 944 and also by Audi and Volkswagen in their belt-driven DOHC engines.

The first two running prototypes of Porsche's M28 V8 initially utilized a single four-barrel carburetor for initial testing. However, the production cars ultimately employed the planned Bosch K-Jetronic fuel injection system. As concerns over fuel prices and availability during the 1970s oil crisis grew within the company, discussions emerged regarding the feasibility of smaller engines to improve fuel economy. There was a proposal for the development of a 3.3-litre, 182 PS (134 kW; 180 bhp) powerplant, suggested by Fuhrmann, but this was met with resistance from company engineers. Eventually, both sides reached a consensus on a 4.5-litre, SOHC (per bank) 16-valve V8 engine producing 240 PS (177 kW; 237 bhp), 219 hp (163 kW) in North America. This design was deemed to strike an acceptable balance between performance and fuel efficiency.

By 1973, essential development was finished and a prototype was built and under testing. At this moment, the Arab-Israeli war broke out and brought the threat of energy crisis. Sales of large and thirsty cars plunged. It was a big hit to both 928 and Porsche. The project was put into low gear and production postponed until 1977.

The finished car made its debut at the 1977 Geneva Motor Show and was subsequently released for sale later that year as a 1978 model. Despite earning early acclaim for its comfort, power, and futuristic design, sales were initially sluggish. The base prices of the 928 were considerably higher than the previous range-topping 911 model, and the shift to a front-engined, water-cooled design unsettled some traditional Porsche enthusiasts.

Following the departure of Fuhrmann, Peter Schutz, his successor, opted to continue selling both models concurrently, believing that the 911 still had a place in the company's lineup. However, legislative restrictions against rear-engined vehicles never materialized. Although the 928 didn't achieve the sales targets envisioned by Fuhrmann, it garnered a devoted following and enjoyed an 18-year production run.

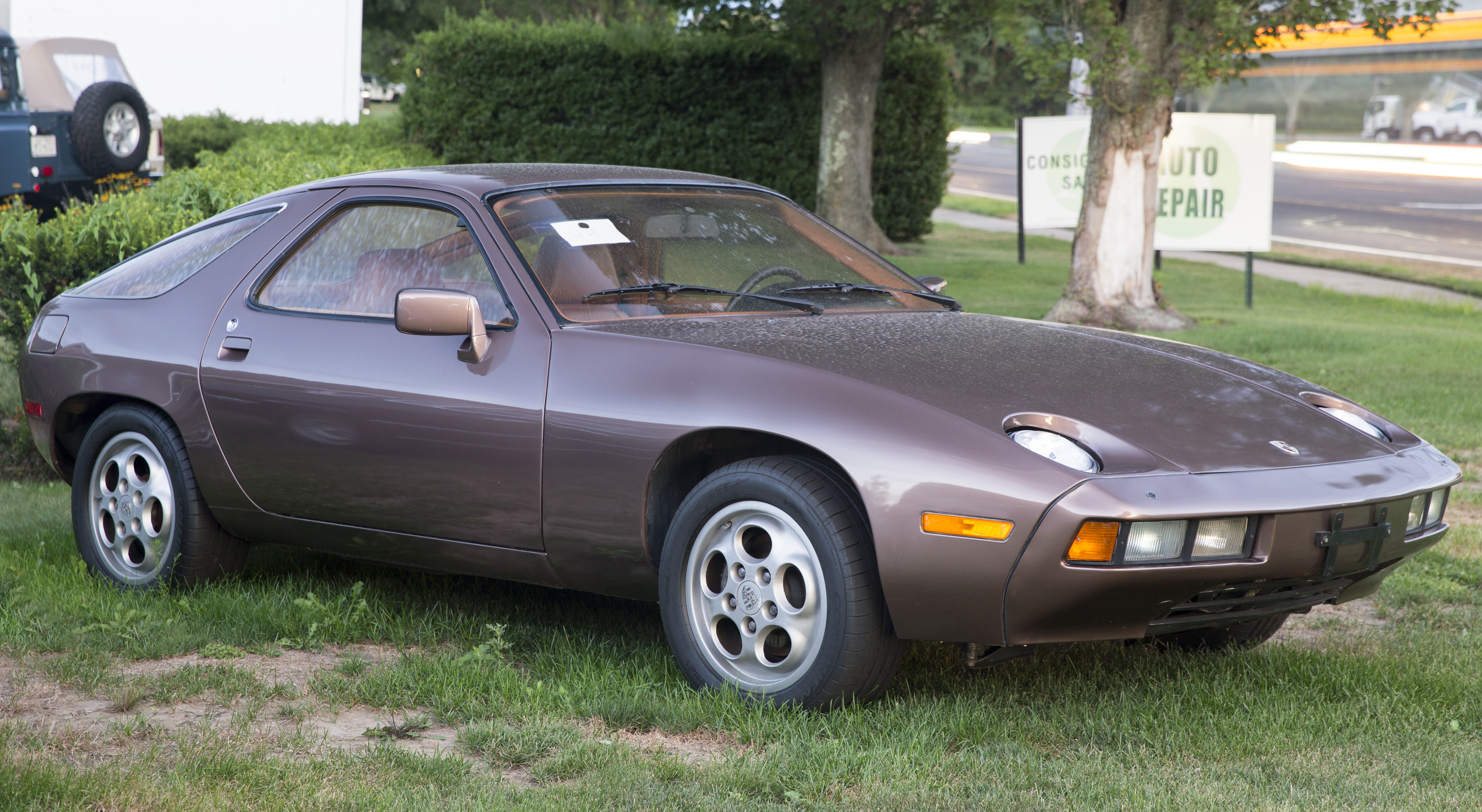
Pre-facelift Porsche 928 (1978; US)

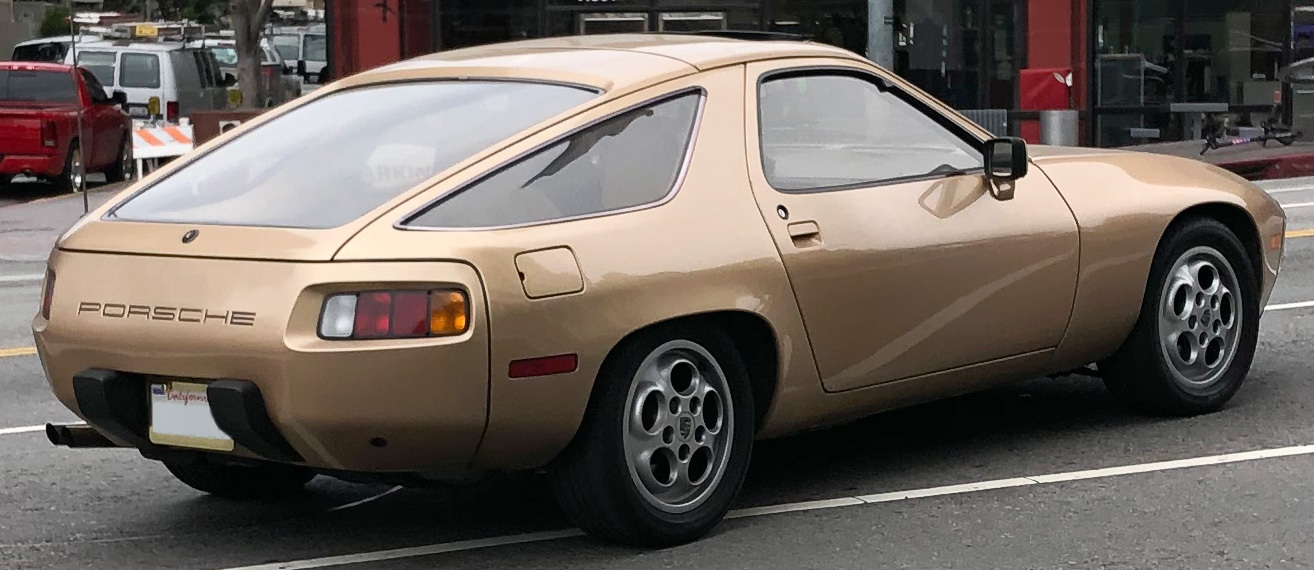
Early Porsche 928 (rear)

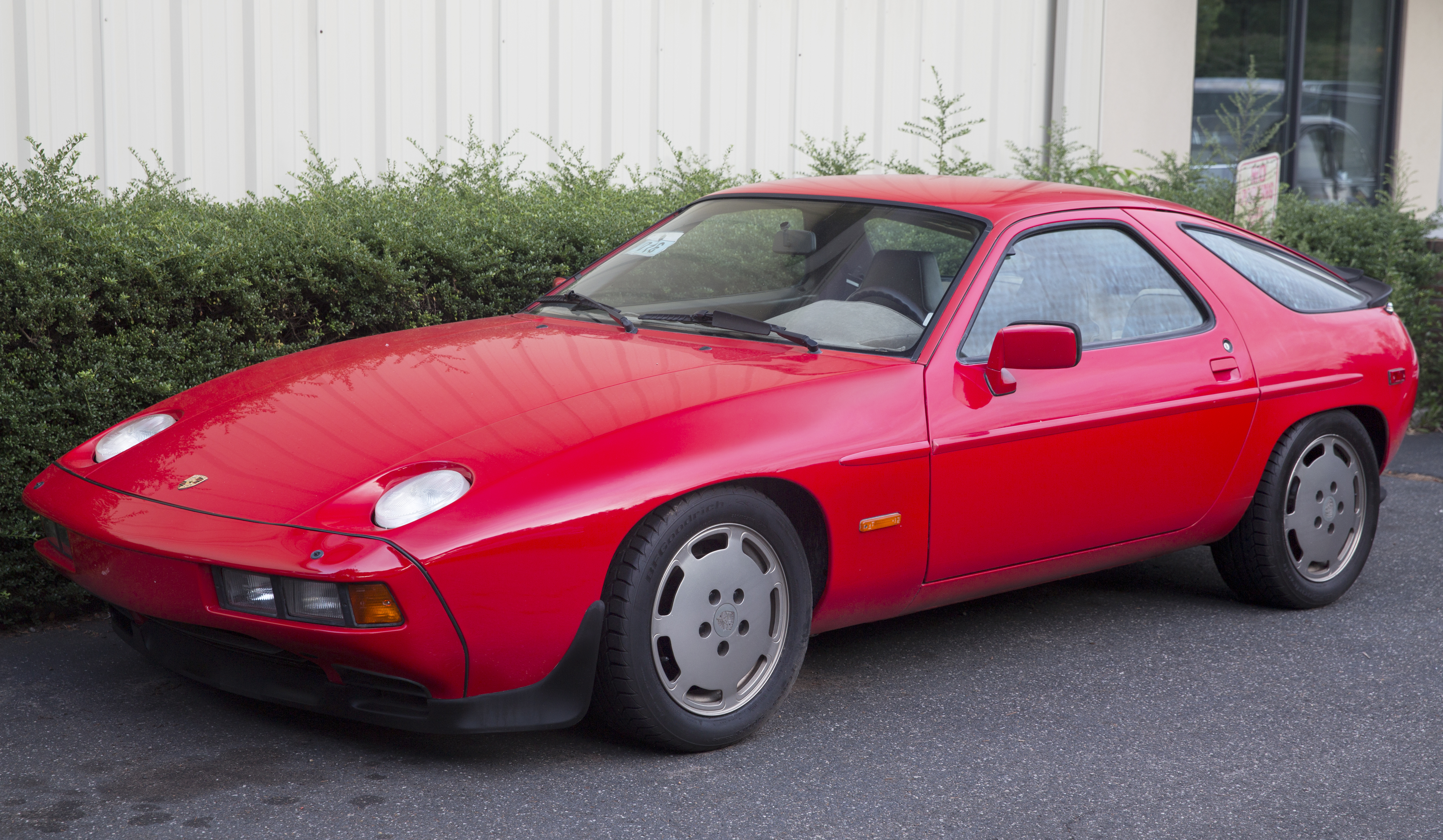
1984 Porsche 928S

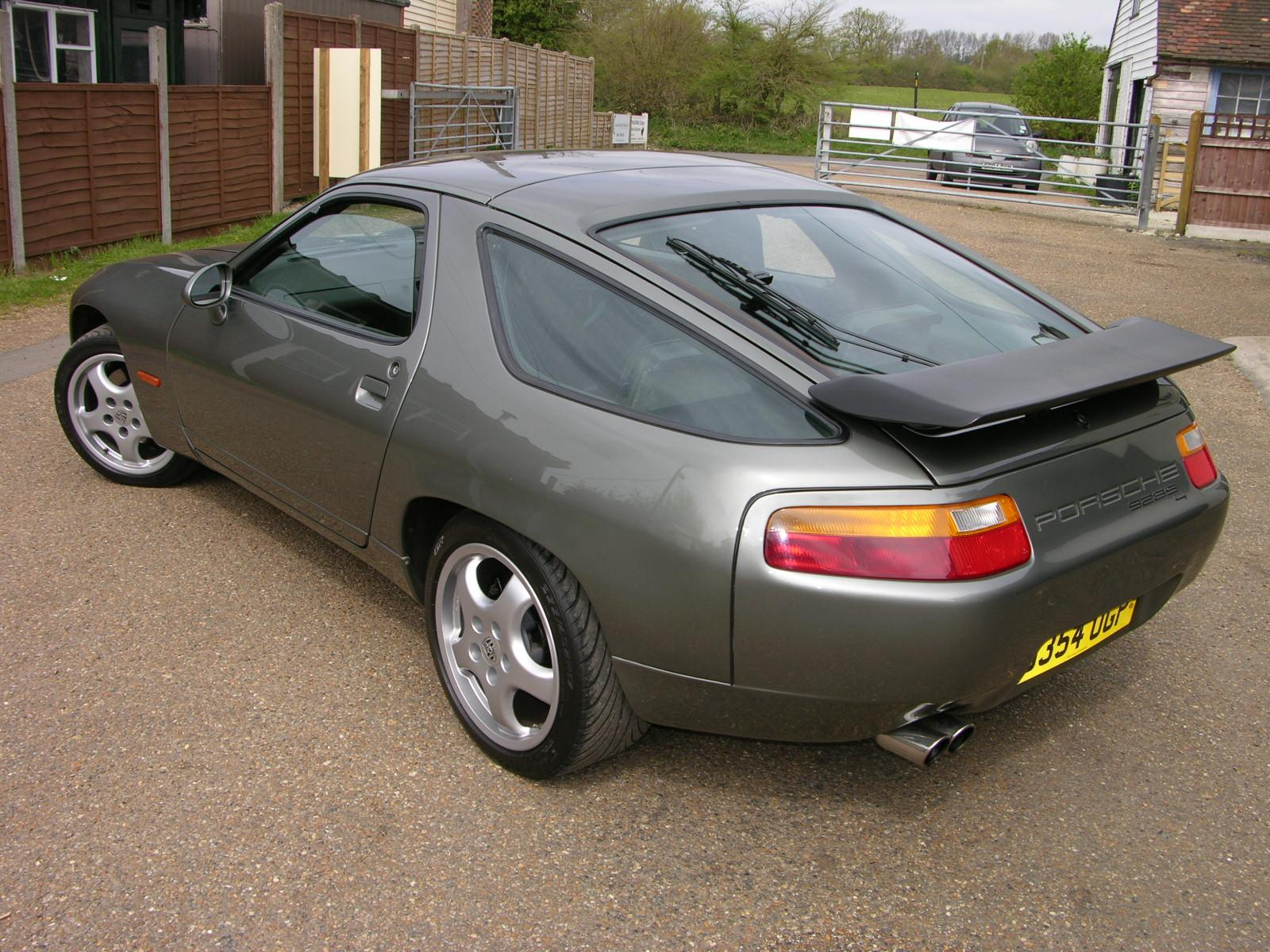
Porsche 928 S4 (rear view)

== Design and specifications ==
Porsche 928 headlights

During its 18-year production run, the fundamentals of the 928's design remained the same, though the engine and styling underwent several changes, with a distinct ‘facelift’ separating the first generation and second generation cars.

The original 928 design was seen in both 1978 and 1979, with the body lacking both front and rear spoilers. From 1980 (1983 in North America) through 1986, front and rear spoilers were present on "S" and "S2" models, being integrated into the fastback. The first generation cars, which terminated in 1986 with the "S"/"S2" models, all featured a sharper, more angular front end with a distinct 'Shark Nose' profile. From 1987 the overall exterior design was revised and it was this shape that followed the 928 through to final production in 1995. The 1987 redesign integrated the front spoiler into the nose, smoothing out the overall nose profile to fit in with the tastes of contemporary car design & ditching the more angular, shark-nose wedge of the original cars. The rear spoiler became a separate wing rather than an integrated piece and side skirts were also added. The rear tail-light configuration was also different from previous models, with more modern light covers that brought the rear light cluster away from the inset design of the original. GTS models featured flared rear wheel arches to give more room for wider 9-inch wide wheels. Another easily noticeable visual difference between versions is the style of the wheels. Early 928s had 15-inch or 16-inch "phone dial"-style wheels, while most 1980s 928s had 16-inch slotted "flat disc" wheels, with other wheels available as an option. CSs, SEs and 1989 GTs had 16-inch "Club Sport" wheels, later GTs had 16-inch "Design 90" style wheels which were also option on same period S4s (shared with the 944 as well), the GTS used two variations of the 17-inch "CUP" wheels.

The 928 featured a front-mounted and water-cooled V8 engine driving the rear wheels. Power was transmitted according to the transaxle principle. Originally displacing 4.5 L and featuring a single overhead camshaft design, it was rated at 240 PS (177 kW; 237 bhp) in Europe, while smog equipment reduced the output to 219 hp (163 kW) for cars sold in the North American market. The car would first see an increase in both displacement and output for the 1980 model year, with the introduction of the 4.7 L 928 S. The original 16v engine would continue to be developed until its final iteration in the 1985 model year with the S/S2 model, which produced a 310 PS (228 kW; 306 hp) in European specification, thanks to higher compression, twin distributors with EZK ignition and Bosch LH-Jetronic fuel injection. After 1986 the 16v engine was replaced by the Porsche 32v 5.0 L V8, which Porsche used until the 928 ceased production in 1995.

In combination with the water-cooled V8 engine, Porsche utilised a transaxle in the 928 to help achieve 50/50 front/rear weight distribution. Performance of early cars were similar to the contemporary 911, despite being heavier. By the time the S/S2 specification was in production, the 928 was outperforming even the 911 Turbo in top speed tests. Early cars came with either a five-speed dog leg manual transmission, or a 3 speed Mercedes-Benz-derived automatic transmission. A four-speed automatic transmission replaced the three-speed option from 1983 in North America and 1984 in other markets. Of cars produced in 1978 and 1979, the majority were fitted with the 5 speed manual gearbox while the optional 3 speed automatic was specified less regularly. Later model years number of automatic cars was larger. 1980-95 percentage of manual cars was 34%. As so many 1978 and 1979 were with manual gearbox actual split can be 60% automatic and 40% manual.

The body, styled by Wolfgang Möbius under the guidance of Anatole Lapine used aluminium for the doors, front wing, front fenders, and bonnet to save weight, while the underlying chassis was made from galvanised steel. It had a substantial luggage area accessed via a large hatchback. Newly developed polyurethane elastic bumpers were integrated into the nose and tail and covered in body-coloured plastic; an advanced feature for the time that aided the car visually and reduced its drag. The distinctive pop-up headlamps, which remained visible in the wings even when they were retracted, completed the 928's shark-like appearance and were based on the units found on the Lamborghini Miura.

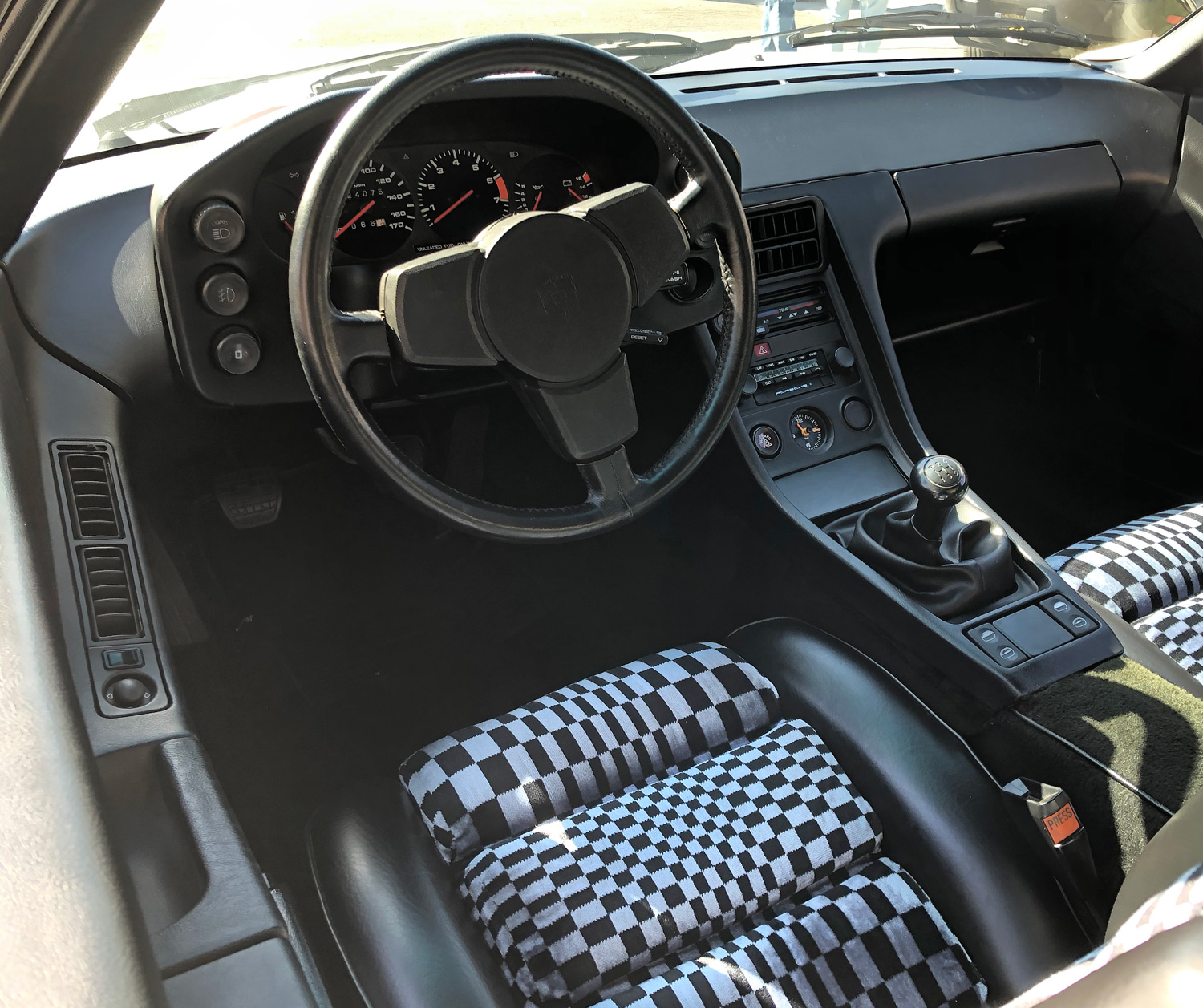
Interior from an early car with "Pasha" pattern seat trim

The Porsche 928 was classified as a 2+2, featuring two small rear seats. Both rear seats were designed to fold down, providing additional space in the luggage area. Sun visors were available for both front and rear occupants. However, the rear seats were limited in size due to the transmission hump, resulting in minimal legroom. They were generally suitable for short trips or for accommodating children rather than adults.

One notable feature of the 928 was its innovative instrument cluster, which moved along with the adjustable steering wheel to ensure maximum visibility for the driver.

The 928 also incorporated the "Weissach Axle", a passive rear-wheel steering system aimed at enhancing stability while braking and during turns. The engine was distinguished by its unsleeved, silicon alloy engine block made of aluminum, contributing to reduced weight and durable cylinder bore.

Porsche's design and development efforts were recognized when the 928 won the European Car of the Year award in 1978, surpassing competitors like the BMW 7 Series and the Ford Granada. It remains the only sports car to have received this accolade.

== Later variants ==
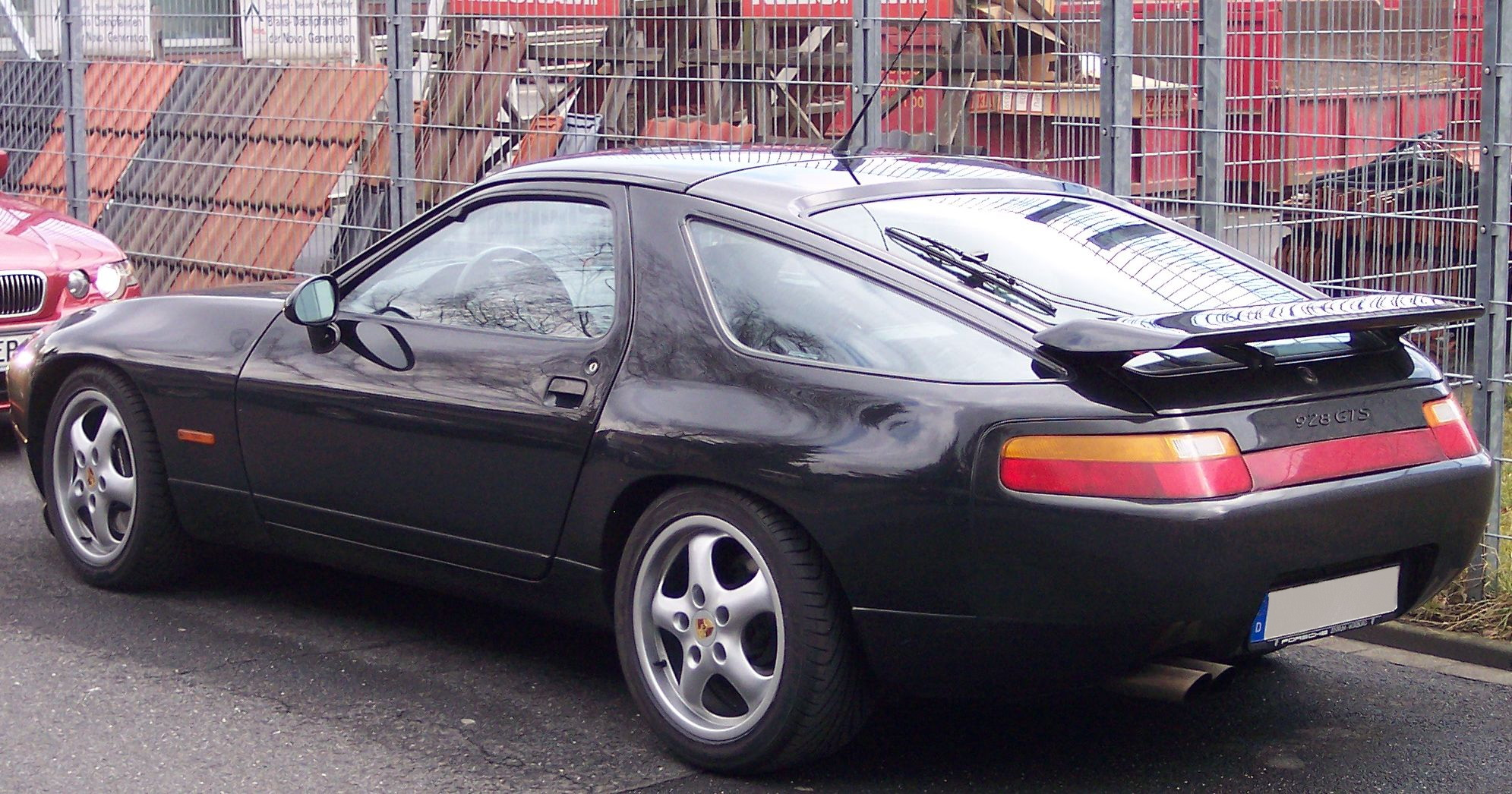
Porsche 928 GTS

Porsche introduced a refreshed 928 S into the European market in the 1980 model year, although it was the summer of 1982 and MY 1983 before the model reached North America. Externally, the S wore new front and rear spoilers and sported wider wheels and tires than the older variant, but the main change for the 928 S was under the hood, where a revised 4.7 L engine was used. European versions debuted with 300 PS (221 kW; 296 bhp), and were upgraded to 310 PS (228 kW; 306 bhp) for the 1984 model year. From 1984 to 1986, the S model was called S2 in United Kingdom. These cars used Bosch LH-Jetronic fuel injection system and purely electronic Bosch ignition, the same systems used on the later 32-valve cars. North American-spec 1983 and 1984 S models used among other differences, smaller valves, milder camshafts, smaller diameter intake manifolds, and additional pollution equipment in order to meet emissions regulations, and were limited to 234 hp (174 kW; 237 PS) as a result. Due to low-grade fuel, the 16-valve low compression S engine was made for the Australian market in the 1985 model year. It had a 9.3:1 compression ratio pistons as opposed to the normal 10.4:1 but used the same large intake, high lift cams, large valves, etc. of other S engines.

During the initial three years of its production, the faster European variant of the Porsche 928 was not available in the United States and Canada. To address this, Porsche introduced a "Competition Group" option for North American customers, offering them a package that mimicked the appearance of the S model. This package included front and rear spoilers, 16-inch flat disc wheels, sport seats, sport springs, and Bilstein Shock Absorbers. Customers had the flexibility to choose paint and interior colors just like with a standard 928. Only two cars were produced with this option in the late 1980 model year for the U.S. market. The package officially became available for the 1981 and 1982 model years but was discontinued in 1983 with the introduction of the S model in these markets. Over time, many cars have been modified by subsequent owners to include S model features, making original "Competition Group" cars difficult to identify without checking option codes.

In the 1982 model year, two special models were introduced for different markets. North America received 202 "Weissach Edition" cars, featuring champagne gold metallic paint, matching brushed gold flat disc wheels, two-tone leather interior, a production number plaque on the dashboard, and a three-piece Porsche luggage set. It's worth noting that these cars were believed not to be equipped with S spoilers, despite the availability of S spoilers in the U.S. during this period as part of the "Competition Group" option. A "Weissach Edition" option was also offered for the US market 911 for the 1980 model year and on the 924 for the 1981 model year.

140 special "50th Jubilee" 928 S models were made available outside the U.S. and Canada in late 1981, to celebrate the company's 50-year existence as a car manufacturer. This model is also sometimes referred to as the "Ferry Porsche Edition" because his signature was embroidered into the front seats. It featured meteor metallic paint and was fitted with flat disc wheels, wine red leather and special striped fabric seat centers. Similar 911 and 924 specials were also made for world markets.

Porsche updated the North American 928 S for 1985, replacing the 4.7 L SOHC engine with a new 5.0-liter DOHC unit sporting four valves per cylinder and producing 288 hp (215 kW; 292 PS). Seats were also updated to a new style, these cars are sometimes unofficially called S3 to distinguish them from 16-valve "S" models. European models kept the 4.7 engine, which was somewhat more powerful as standard, though a lower compression (9.3:1) 32-valve engine together with catalytic converters became an option in some European countries and Australia for 1986. In 1986, revised suspension settings, larger brakes with 4-piston callipers, and a modified exhaust system was available on the 928S, marking the final changes to old body style cars. These were straight from the 928S4, which was to debut a few months later. These changes came starting from VIN 1001, which means that the first thousand 1986 cars had the old brakes, but later cars had this equipment available. This later 1986 model is sometimes referred to as a 1986 1/2 or 1986.5 because of these changes. The name is a little misleading as more than 3/4 of the 1986 production had these updates.

=== 928 S4 ===
The 928 S4 variant debuted in the second half of 1986 as a 1987 model, an updated version of the 5.0 L V8 for all markets producing 320 PS (235 kW; 316 bhp), sporting a new single-disc clutch in manual transmission cars, a larger torque converter in automatic transmission cars and fairly significant styling updates which gave the car a cleaner, sleeker look. The 928 S4 had a rounded front end with air intakes. The rear had a slope between the wide, flush-fitting rear lights and a black rear spoiler standing up from the body. S4 was much closer to being a true world car than previous models as the only major differences for North American models were instrumentation in either kilometers or miles, lighting, front and rear bumper shocks, and the availability of catalytic converters in many other markets. The Australian market version was the only one with different horsepower rating at 221 kW; 296 hp (300 PS) due to preparation for possible low grade fuel. Even this was achieved without engine changes.

A Club Sport variant which was up to 100 kg (220 lb) lighter became available to continental Europe and U.S. in 1988. This model was the toned down version of the 1987 factory prototype which had a lightened body. Also in 1987, the factory made five white lightweight S4 models with a manual transmission for racecar drivers who were on their payroll at the time (Derek Bell, Jochen Mass, Hans Stuck, Bob Wollek and Jacky Ickx). These were close to same as later actual Club Sport models and can also be considered prototypes for it. An SE (sometimes called the S4 Sport due to model designation on rear bumper), a sort of halfway point between a normally equipped S4 and the more race-oriented Club Sport, became available for the UK market. It's generally believed that these cars have more power than the usual S4. They utilize parts which later became known as GT pistons, cams and engine ECU programs. Some of them had stronger, short ratio manual transmission. The automatic transmission was not available for this model.

For the 1989 model year, a visible change inside was digital trip computer in the dashboard. At the same time Australian models received the same 235 kW; 316 hp (320 PS) engine management setup as other markets. Porsche debuted the 928 GT in the late winter 1988/89 after dropping the slow-selling CS and SE. In terms of equipment, the GT was like the 928 SE, having more equipment than a Club Sport model but less than a 928 S4 to keep the weight down somewhat. It had the ZF 40% limited-slip differential as standard like the Club Sport and SE before it. Also, like the CS and SE, the GT was only available with a manual gearbox. European 1989 CS and GT wheels had an RDK tire pressure monitoring system as standard, which was also optional for the same year S4. For the 1990 model year Porsche made RDK and a 0-100% variable ratio limited-slip called PSD (Porsche Sperr Differential) standard in both GT and S4 models for all markets. This system is much like the one from the flagship 959 and gives the vehicle even more grip on the track. In 1990, the S4 was no longer available with a manual transmission.

=== 928 GTS ===
The S4 and GT variants halted production at the end of the 1991 model year, making way for the final version of the 928. The 928 GTS was available for sale in late 1991 as a 1992 model in Europe and in spring of 1992 as an early 1993 model in North America. Changed bodywork, larger front brakes and a new, more powerful 5.4 L, 350 PS (257 kW; 345 bhp) engine were the big advertised changes; what Porsche wasn't advertising was the price. Loaded GTS models could eclipse US$100,000 in 1995, making them among the most expensive cars on the road at the time. This severely hampered sales despite the model's high competency and long standard equipment list. Porsche discontinued the GTS model that year after shipping only 77 of them to the United States. Total worldwide production for all years was a little over 61,000 cars.

Second-hand models' value decreased as a result of high maintenance costs due to spare parts that are expensive to manufacture. Many parts suppliers and enthusiast networks exist, especially in the United States, Germany and the UK.

== Timeline ==
		1970s		1980s										1990s					
		8	9	0	1	2	3	4	5	6	7	8	9	0	1	2	3	4	5
European	928	4.5L 16V 240 PS																	
European	928 S			4.7L 16V 300 PS				4.7L 16V 310 PS											
European	928 S 50th Jubilee M406					4.7L 16V; 300 PS													
European	928 S4										5.0L 32V 320 PS								
European	928 CS											5.0L 32V; 320 PS							
European	928 GT													5.0L 32V; 330 PS					
European	928 GTS															5.4L 32V 350 PS			
UK	928 S2							4.7L 16V 310 PS											
UK	928 SE											5.0L 32V 320 PS							
Australia	928 S M151								4.7L 16V; 275 PS										
Australia	928 S4										5.0L 32V 300 PS								
Germany; Austria; Australia; Japan	928 S M298/M299									5.0L 32V; 288 PS									
		1970s		1980s										1990s					
		8	9	0	1	2	3	4	5	6	7	8	9	0	1	2	3	4	5
U.S. Canada	928	4.5L 16V 219 hp		4.5L 16V 228 hp															
U.S. Canada	928 Competition Group M471				4.5L 16V 228 hp														
U.S. Canada	928 Weissach Edition M462					4.5L 16V 228 hp													
U.S. Canada	928 S						4.7L 16V; 239 hp												
U.S. Canada	928 S								5.0L 32V; 288 hp										
U.S. Canada	928 S4										5.0L 32V 316 hp								
U.S. Canada	928 CS											5.0L 32V 316 hp							
U.S. Canada	928 GT													5.0L 32V; 326 hp					
U.S. Canada	928 GTS																5.4L 32V; 345 hp		
		8	9	0	1	2	3	4	5	6	7	8	9	0	1	2	3	4	5
		1970s		1980s										1990s					

== Worldwide production numbers ==
All production numbers are approximate figures collected from several sources, as Porsche has not published actual numbers.

Model	Model years	Numbers made
928 ^{(1, 2}	1978–82	17,669
928 S ^{(3}	1980–83	8,315
928 S/S2 ^{(4, 5, 6, 7}	1984–86	14,347
928 S4 ^{(8}	1987–91	15,682
928 CS ^{(9}	1988–89 1/2	19
928 SE	1988	42
928 GT ^{(10}	1989 1/2–91	2,078
928 GTS ^{(11}	1992–95	2,904
Total	1978–95	61,056

^{1) Count contains 2 1980, 458 1981 and 1,084 1982 US "Competition Group" models made.}
^{2) Count contains 202 US "Weissach edition" models made in 1982 model year. 205 is official number which don't seem to be correct. Cars with higher production number than 202 or 205 exist. 217 is known existing plaque number but there were only 202 cars made with M462 option code.}
^{3) Count contains 141 European "50th Jubilee" models made in 1982 model year.}
^{4) Count contains 44 M151 low compression 16V 4.7L S engine models made in 1985 model year for Australian market.}
^{5) Count contains 2,219 so-called S3 US models made in 1985 model year and 877 1986 models made in early part of 1986 model year up to November 1985.}
^{6) Count contains 517 1986 European 32-valve S models. Most were Australian and Japanese models. 266 were optional M298/M299 catalytic converter models sold in Germany, Switzerland and Austria.}
^{7) Count contains 2,071 so-called S3.5 US models made in later part of 1986 model year starting from November 1985.}
^{8) Count contains 6 Club Sport prototypes made in the 1987 model year.}
^{9) Count contains 10 European models and 2 US models made in 1988 model year and 7 European models made in early part of 1989 model year. Last Club Sport cars were made in early winter 1988/89.}
^{10) Count contains 358 European and 115 US/CDN model made in 1989 model year, 808 European and 142 US made in 1990, 516 European and 145 US made in 1991 resulting 1682 European and 396 US model made over two and half year time period. GT production started in around February 1989.}
^{11) Count contains 955 1992, 621 1993, 523 1994 and 399 1995 European models resulting 2,498 cars made. Count contains 88 early VIN 1993, 102 late VIN 1993, 19 + 120 1994 and 77 1995 US models resulting 406 cars made.}

== Special versions ==
=== Porsche 942 ===
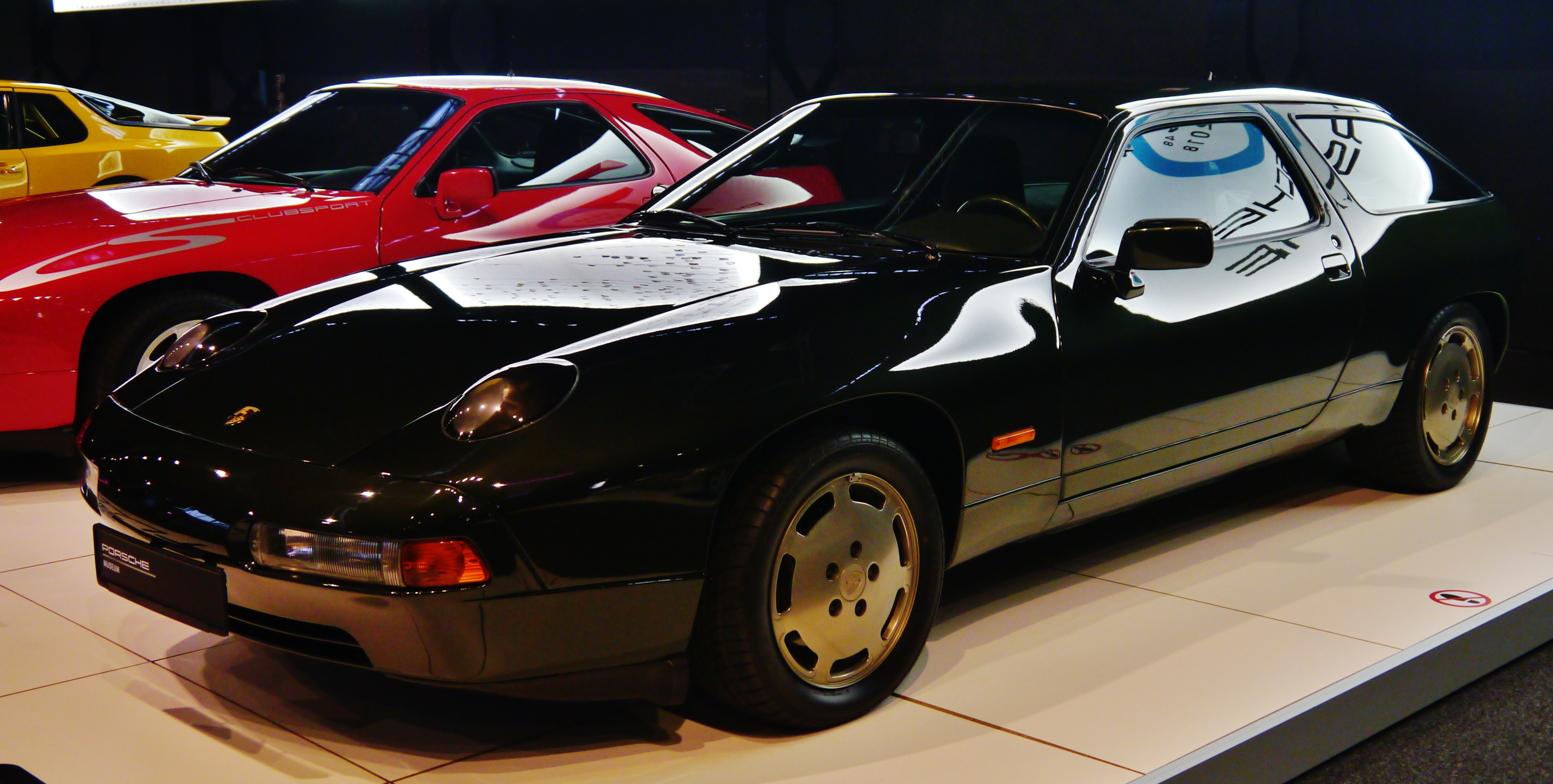
Porsche 942 at Autoworld in Brussels

The Porsche 942 was a special edition 928 presented by the company as a gift to Ferry Porsche on his 75th birthday in 1984. It's also known as the 928–4. It featured a 25 cm (10 in) longer wheelbase than the normal 928 production model, including an extended roof above the rear seats to better accommodate tall passengers, and what were at the time very advanced projector headlights. The weight increased marginally, by 75 kg (165 lb). It also received the new front and rear bumpers two years before they entered production on the S4 and the 5.0-litre 32-valve engine before it was introduced in the US market. This early model of the engine was slightly less powerful, producing 310 PS (228 kW) and 420 N⋅m (310 lb⋅ft) of torque at 2700 rpm.

=== "Study H50" Four-door 928 based prototype ===
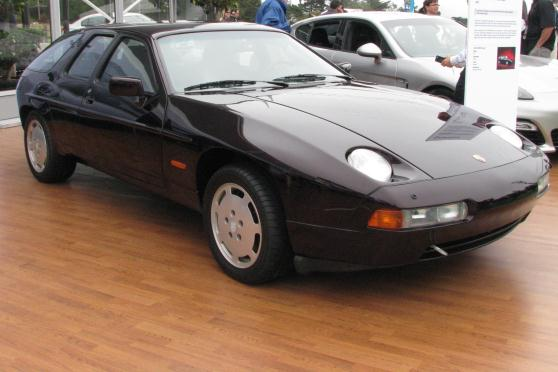
H50 Four-door 928

Three years later, in 1987, the lengthened 928 that had been presented to the company's founder on his 75th birthday turned up as a "Feasibility Study", now with a second (rather narrow) set of doors, apparently opening in the same way as the suicide doors seen on the later Mazda RX-8. At the time "Study H50" appeared to sink with little trace, but two decades later, with the launch of the larger four-door Porsche Panamera saloon, the 928 based four-door saloon prototype from 1987 acquired greater significance.

=== 928 long wheelbase specials ===
In 1986 Porsche together with tuning company AMG made a few long-wheelbase 928 specials. Unlike the 942, these had normal 928 headlights. One was presented to American Sunroof Corporation (ASC) founder and CEO Heinz Prechter. ASC was later partly responsible for manufacturing Porsche 944 S2 cabriolets.

== Racing ==
=== The Max Moritz 'Semi Works' 928 GTR ===
The Porsche 928 GTR (front view)

Porsche's Racing Department never officially entered or prepared a racing 928 for a pure works entry. Porsche did arrange for the creation of a 928 GTR, to compete against the then-dominant 911 (993 GTR) on the race track. In order not to offend the sensibilities of their traditional 911 customers by openly challenging them with a works offering, Porsche asked Max Moritz Racing, their longtime private racing partner from nearby Reutlingen to enter a 928GTR Cup as a 'semi-works' car.

=== All-aluminium 928 ===
For the 1984 24 hours of Daytona, Porsche sent one of its experimental "All-aluminium" 928S to the Brumos Racing Team to be prepared with specific instruction not to modify the car in any way. Porsche wanted to promote the performance of the 928 to North America. The drivers Richard Attwood (GB), Vic Elford (GB), Howard Meister (USA) and Bob Hagestad (USA) were told to just "drive the car". During practice for the 24-hour race the drivers found the car to be somewhat unstable on the high banks of Daytona and wanted to add a rear wing to the car; Porsche denied the request. The Brumos team tinkered with the suspension set up to make the car more stable. The car finished in 15th overall and 4th in the GTO class. One driver stated in an interview later on, that were it not for a lengthy pit stop to fix some body damage, they would have finished in the top 5 overall. The car was then returned to Porsche and is now in the Porsche Museum. A 928S from Raymond Boutinaud also competed at the 24 Hours of Le Mans in 1983 & 1984 with a 22nd-place finish in 1984. The same car also competed in 1000k races at Spa, Brands Hatch and Silverstone in 1984, but with little success.

=== Closed Course Speed Record ===
A new closed course speed record was set for the Porsche 928 at the Transportation Research Center (TRC) proving grounds in Ohio on October 5, 2020. Race car builder and driver Carl Fausett reached 234.434 MPH (377.28 km/h) on the high-banked paved oval. The vehicle was the same car he took to Bonneville (above) with further enhancements. At the time of this race, it had 1134 BHP from a specially constructed and supercharged Porsche 928 V8 and had been named The Meg in reference to the Megalodon. Speeds were measured by Tag/Heuer laser traps and certified by TRC staff. The 234.434 MPH (377.28 km/h) top speed eclipsed the previous record of 216.635 MPH (348.62 km/h) and made the Meg the worlds' fastest 928, and set a new Porsche closed-course record.
