= Porsche V8 engines =

Reciprocating internal combustion engines

Porsche has produced a number of V8 automotive engines over the years. Their first V8 debuted in 1977. Porsche has used their V8 engines in GTs, racing cars, sedans, sportscars, and SUVs.

== Type M28 ==
M28
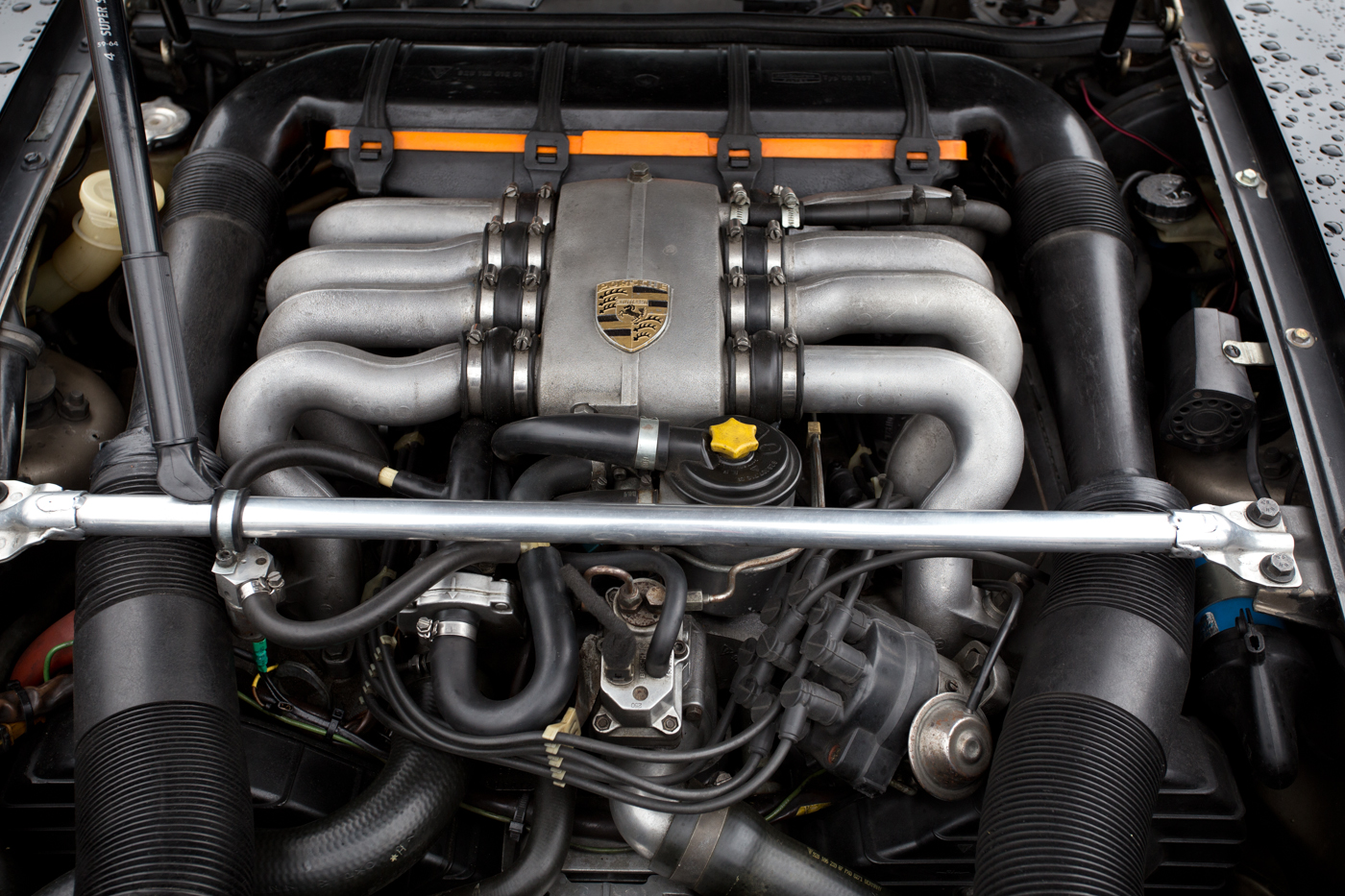

Overview
- Manufacturer: Porsche
- Production: 1977–1995

Layout
- Configuration: 90° V8
- Displacement: 4.5 L (4,474 cc); 4.7 L (4,664 cc); 5.0 L (4,957 cc); 5.4 L (5,397 cc)
- Cylinder bore: 95 mm (3.7 in); 97 mm (3.8 in); 100 mm (3.9 in)
- Piston stroke: 78.9 mm (3.1 in); 85.9 mm (3.4 in)
- Valvetrain: SOHC or DOHC; Two- or four-valves per cylinder

Combustion
- Oil system: Wet sump
- Cooling system: Water-cooled

Porsche's first V8 engine is the Type M28, which debuted in the Porsche 928 in 1977. It is an all-alloy design with a linerless block cast of a hypereutectic aluminum-silicon alloy whose bore surfaces are created by etching the aluminum back, exposing the precipitated silicon using the Alusil process. The M28 was introduced with a single overhead camshaft per cylinder bank operating two valves per cylinder, and bore × stroke measurements of 95 mm × 78.9 mm (3.74 in × 3.11 in), giving a displacement of 4.5 L (4,474 cc; 273.0 cu in). A compression ratio of just 8.5:1 allows it to use regular 91-octane gasoline. This early version makes 176 kW (236 hp) at a 5,500 rpm, which delivered a top speed of 230 km/h (143 mph). Torque is 350 N⋅m (258 lb⋅ft) at 3,600 rpm.

The 928S was released in 1980 with a slightly enlarged version of the M28. Bore was increased to 97 mm (3.82 in), bringing total displacement up to 4.7 L (4,664 cc; 284.6 cu in). Compression was raised to 10.0:1, which required the use of premium gasoline (compression in US models was 9.0:1). Power output rose to 221 kW (296 hp), and top speed was above 250 km/h (155 mph). Another increase of the compression ratio to 10.4:1 in 1984 and a switch to electronic fuel injection boosted power to 228 kW (306 hp).

=== Multi-valve, DOHC redesign ===
The M28 received a substantial redesign in 1985 with the adoption of redesigned cylinder heads with four valves per cylinder and two overhead camshafts per cylinder bank. The bore was increased again, this time to 100 mm (3.94 in), giving a new displacement of 5.0 L (4,957 cc; 302.5 cu in). The European version with its new catalytic conversion emissions control system and 10.1:1 compression ratio produced 212 kW (284 hp). In 1987 the 928 S4 arrived with a 5-litre M28 tuned for premium fuel that produced 235 kW (320 PS). In 1989 a 5-litre 928 GT was released, whose engine made 243 kW (326 hp), thanks to tighter valve timing.

In 1992, Porsche released the 928 GTS, with the largest M28 of all. Bore remained at 100 mm, but the stroke was lengthened to 85.9 mm (3.38 in), for a displacement of 5.4 L (5,397 cc; 329.3 cu in). With compression back up at 10.4:1, this engine produced 369 PS (271 kW).

Production of the M28 V8 engine family ended in 1995, with the end of the 928 model.

=== Applications ===
- Porsche 928

== Type 9M0 ==
9M0
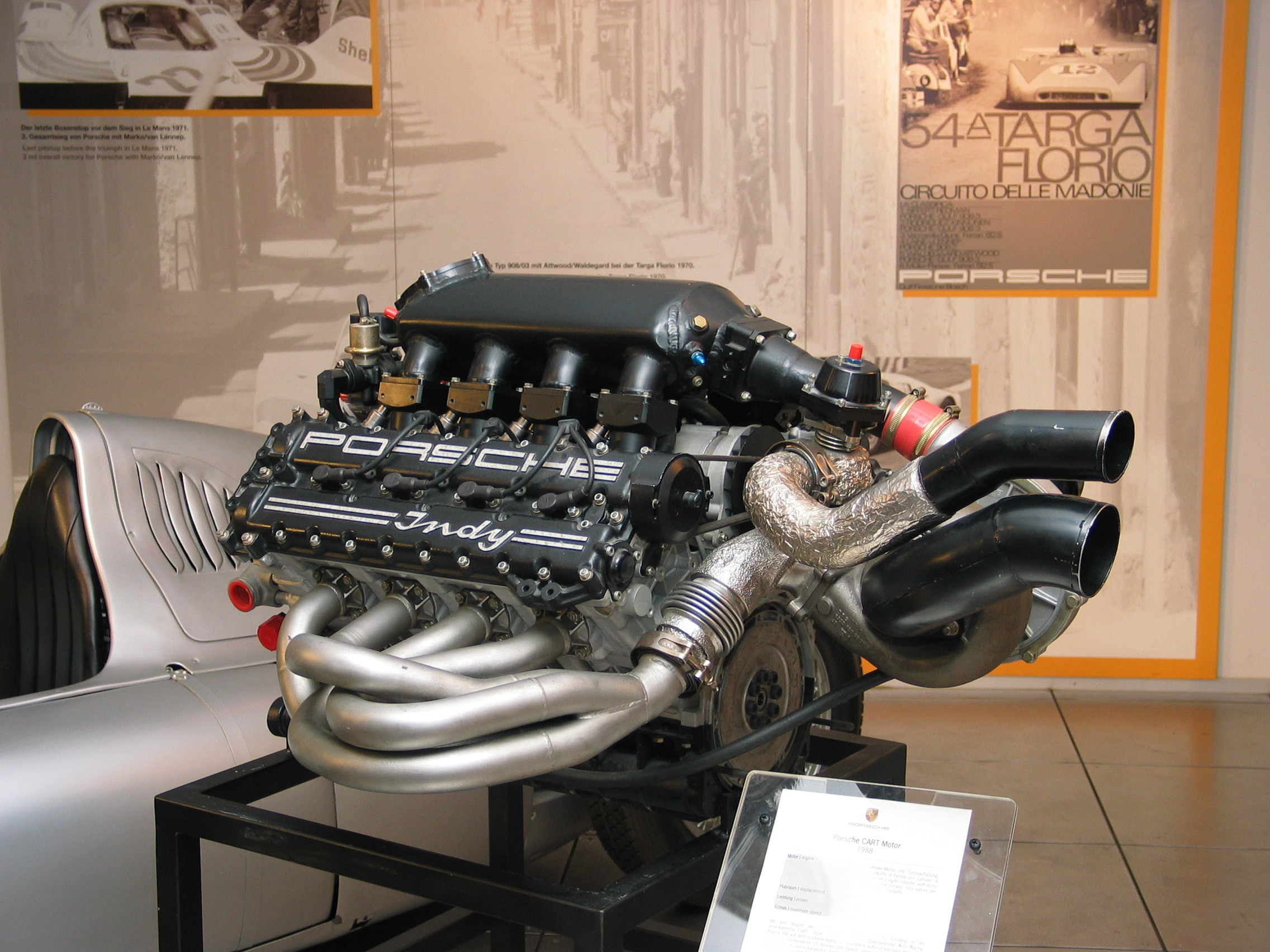

Overview
- Manufacturer: Porsche
- Designer: Hans Mezger
- Also called: 2708/80

Layout
- Configuration: 90° V8
- Displacement: 2.65 L (2,649 cc)
- Cylinder bore: 88.2 mm
- Piston stroke: 54.2 mm
- Cylinder block material: Aluminum
- Cylinder head material: Aluminum
- Valvetrain: DOHC, 4 valves/cyl.

Combustion
- Turbocharger: Single KKK
- Fuel type: Methanol
- Cooling system: Water-cooled

Output
- Power output: 749 PS (551 kW) at 11,200 rpm
- Torque output: 343 lb⋅ft (465 N⋅m) at 8,500 rpm

Porsche developed a new 90° V8 engine for use in Indycar racing in 1988. Called the Type 9M0, it had bore and stroke measures of 88.2 and 54.2 mm (3.47 and 2.13 in) respectively, and displaced 2.65 L (2,649 cc; 161.65 cu in). The 9M0 used a single turbocharger in compliance with Indycar rules. Development was led by Hans Mezger. On methanol fuel, the engine was capable of producing 800 bhp (811 PS; 597 kW) at 11,200 rpm, and 342 lb⋅ft (464 N⋅m) at 8,500 rpm.

=== Applications ===
- Porsche 2708
- March 88C
- March 89P
- March 90P

== Type M48 ==
M48
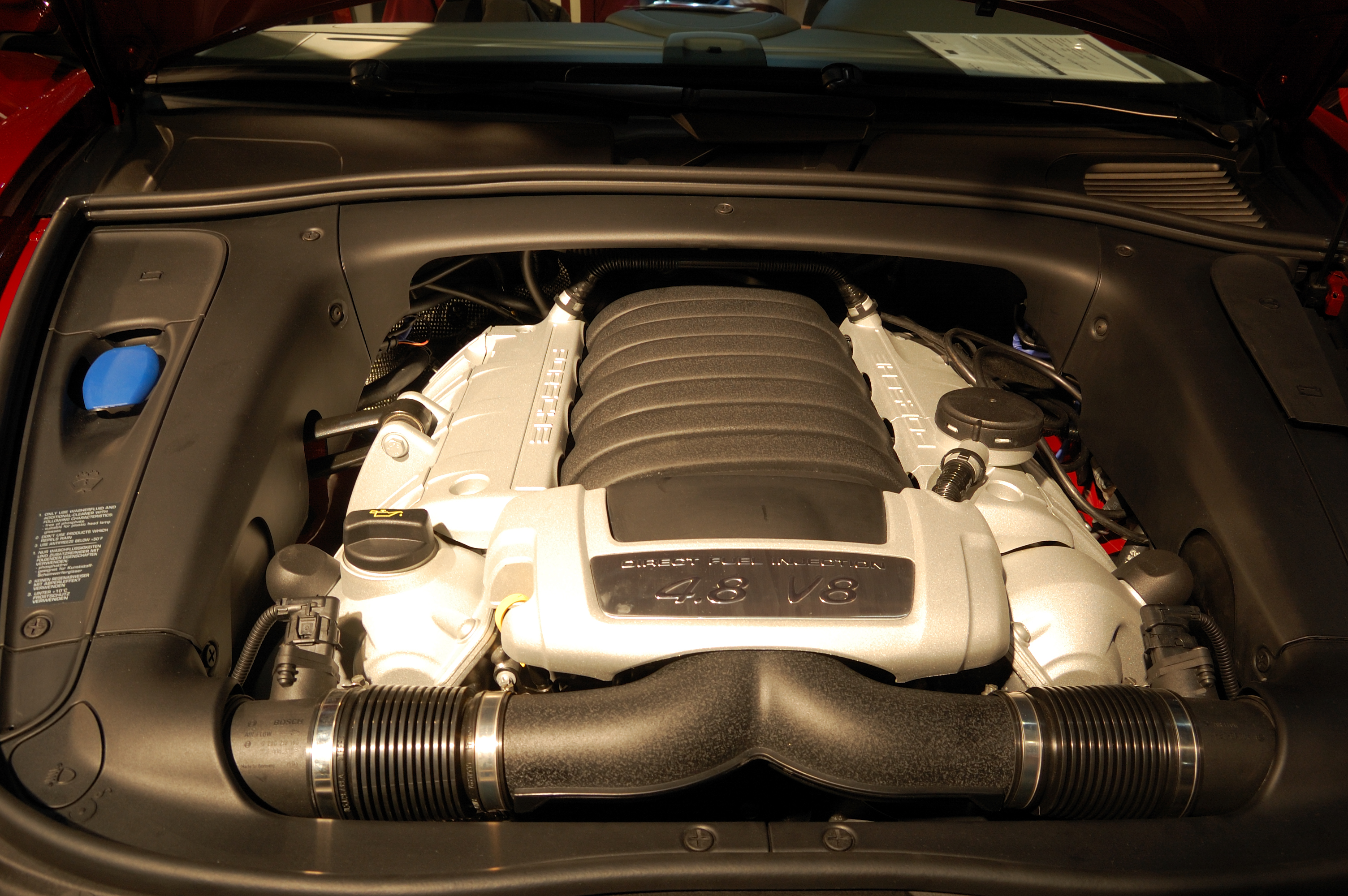
- 4.8 L M48 in Porsche Cayenne

Overview
- Manufacturer: Porsche
- Production: 2002–2016

Layout
- Configuration: 90° V8
- Displacement: 4.5 L (4,510 cc); 4.8 L (4,806 cc)
- Cylinder bore: 93 mm 96 mm
- Piston stroke: 83 mm
- Cylinder block material: Aluminum
- Cylinder head material: Aluminum
- Valvetrain: DOHC, 4 valves/cyl.

Combustion
- Oil system: Dry sump
- Cooling system: Water-cooled

The Type M48 V8 debuted in the Cayenne S SUV in 2003. Like the M28, the first version of the M48 had a nominal displacement of 4.5-litres, but its internal dimensions were different from its predecessor. Bore × stroke are 93 mm × 83 mm (3.7 in × 3.3 in), for a true displacement of 4,510 cc (275.2 cu in). The Type M48 engine was offered in both naturally-aspirated (NA) and forced induction forms, with an unboosted version making 250 kW (335 hp), and an engine with twin turbochargers making 331 kW (444 hp) from the same displacement.

In 2006, Porsche revisited the turbocharged engine and boosted its output to 383 kW (521 PS) for use in the new Cayenne Turbo S.

The M48 line was updated in 2007. Gasoline direct injection arrived as Porsche phased the system in across their product line. Cylinder bores were increased to 96 mm (3.78 in), bringing displacement to 4.8 L (4,806 cc; 293.3 cu in). The Turbo engine received new turbochargers with larger radial turbines. With these changes, the unboosted engine in the Cayenne S had an output of 283 kW (380 hp), while the turbo engine now made 368 kW (493 hp) of power.

The M48 was also offered in the Panamera released in 2009. In the sedan, the naturally-aspirated engine produced 294 kW (394 hp) and 500 N⋅m (369 ft⋅lb) of torque, while the twin-turbo 4.8-litre made 368 kW (493 hp) and 700 N⋅m (516 ft⋅lb). Extensive use of lightweight alloys and design changes reduced engine mass by several kilograms. Less than one year later, these versions were introduced to the Cayenne lineup as well.

Even higher-power versions for the sports models of the Panamera and Cayenne were developed. The naturally-aspirated engine made 316 kW (424 hp) in the Panamera GTS, and 309 kW (414 hp) in the Cayenne GTS. The turbocharged engine in the Cayenne Turbo delivered 382 kW (512 hp), the one in the Panamera Turbo S 405 kW (543 hp), and the version in the Cayenne Turbo S peaked at 419 kW (562 hp).

=== Daytona Prototype engine ===
A Daytona Prototype car built by the Spirit of Daytona team was to use a Fabcar FDSC/03 chassis and a 5.0-litre V8 derived from the engine used in the Porsche Cayenne, making it likely to have been some type of M48 engine. The 5.0-litre engine is a special version built by the team, and did not carry Porsche badging.

=== Applications ===
- Porsche Cayenne
- Porsche Panamera
- Fabcar FDSC/03

== Type MR6 ==
MR6
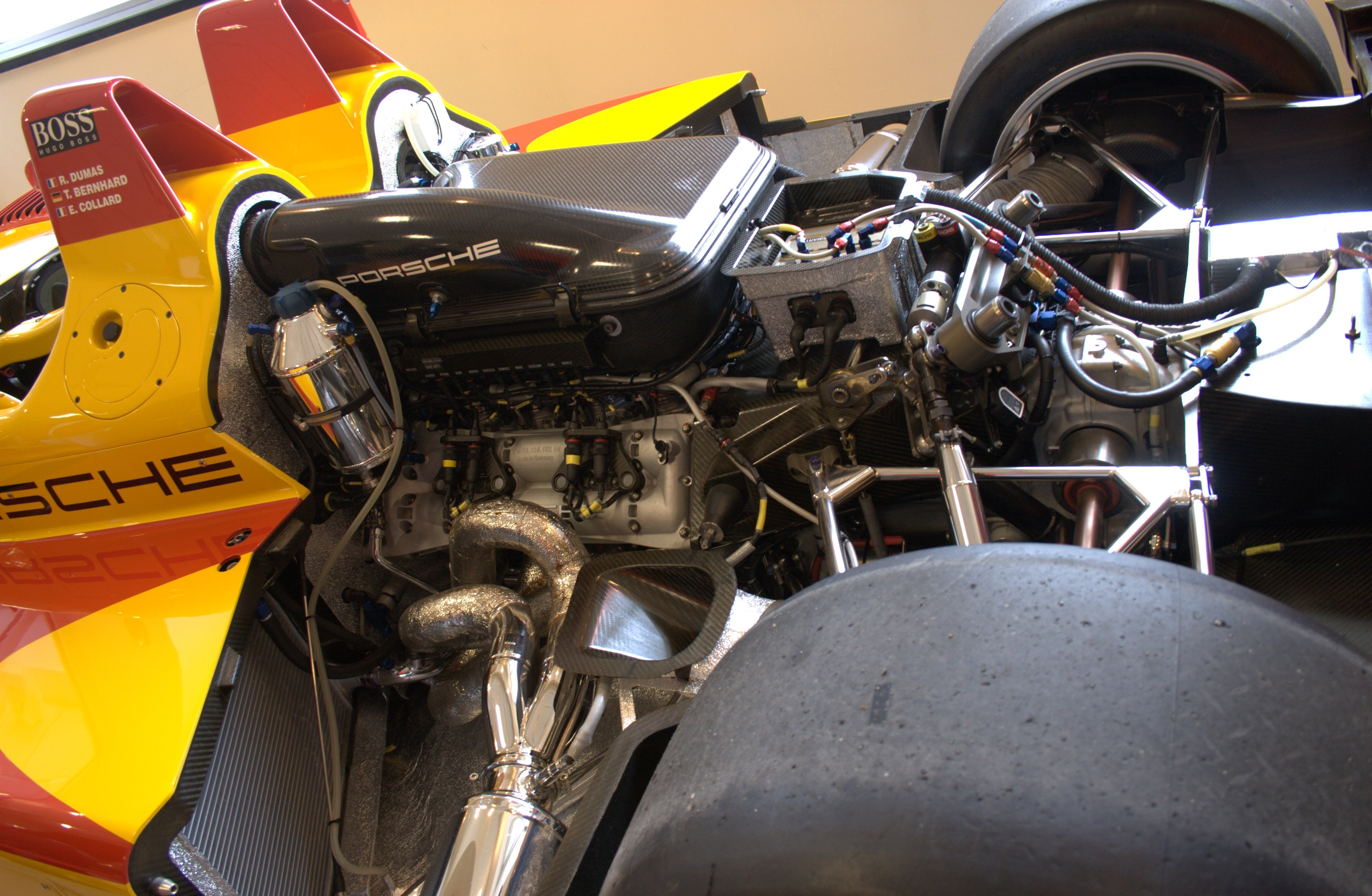
- 3.4 L MR6 V8 in Porsche RS Spyder

Overview
- Manufacturer: Porsche
- Production: 2005–2010

Layout
- Configuration: 90° V8
- Displacement: 3.4 L (3,397 cc)
- Cylinder bore: 95 mm (3.74 in)
- Piston stroke: 59.9 mm (2.36 in)
- Cylinder block material: Aluminum
- Cylinder head material: Aluminum
- Valvetrain: DOHC, 4 valves/cyl.

Combustion
- Oil system: Dry sump
- Cooling system: Water-cooled

Output
- Power output: 480 bhp (358 kW) at 10,100 rpm

The MR6 engine was designed by Porsche with input from Penske Racing. Bore and stroke are 95 and 59.9 mm (3.7 and 2.4 in) respectively, for a total displacement of 3.4 L (3,397 cc; 207.3 cu in). The engine uses a flat-plane crankshaft. The MR6 was used in the Porsche RS Spyder, where the engine drove the rear wheels through a six-speed electro-pneumatic sequential gearbox.

When introduced in 2005 the engine produced 478 horsepower (356 kW). In 2007, the car was renamed the Porsche RS Spyder Evo, and engine output was up to 503 PS (370 kW). In mid-2008 the engine received direct fuel injection. Peak power was unchanged from 2007, and fell to 440 metric horsepower (324 kW) in 2009-spec with air restrictor limitations.

=== Applications ===
- Porsche RS Spyder

== Type M18 ==
M18

Overview
- Manufacturer: Porsche
- Production: 2013–2015

Layout
- Configuration: 90° V8
- Displacement: 4.6 L (4,593 cc)
- Cylinder bore: 95 mm
- Piston stroke: 81 mm
- Cylinder block material: Aluminum
- Cylinder head material: Aluminum
- Valvetrain: DOHC, 4 valves/cyl.

Combustion
- Oil system: Dry sump
- Cooling system: Water-cooled

Dimensions
- Dry weight: 135 kg (298 lb)

Porsche's next V8 was the Type M18, which went into production in 2013 and was used in the 918 Spyder. The M18 is a 4,593 cc (4.6 L; 280.3 cu in) naturally aspirated V8 engine built on the same architecture as the MR6 used in the RS Spyder Le Mans Prototype racing car. The M18 has a flat-plane crankshaft with 180 degrees of offset between crank throws. In the 918 Spyder, the engine is part of a gas/electric hybrid drive system.

In developing the M18 from the MR6, the bore remained at 95 mm, while the stroke was increased to 81 mm for 4.6 L (4,593 cc; 280.3 cu in). The engine runs to 9,200 rpm.

The M18 uses direct fuel injection with centrally located solenoid injectors that deliver fuel at pressures up to 200 bar (2,901 psi). Features such as titanium connecting rods and thin-walled, low-pressure castings of the crankcase and cylinder heads keep weight to a minimum.

The M18 delivers 447 kW (608 PS; 599 hp) at 8,700 rpm and 540 N⋅m (398 lbf⋅ft) of torque at 6,700 rpm. This is supplemented by two electric motors delivering an additional 210 kW (286 PS; 282 hp) total: a 115 kW (156 PS; 154 hp) electric motor drives the rear wheels in parallel with the engine and also serves as the main generator, and a 95 kW (129 PS; 127 hp) motor drives the front wheels. In 2011, a more highly tuned M18 was used in the 918 Spyder RSR that offered 563 bhp (420 kW) at 10,300 rpm.

At 132 hp/litre displacement, it had the highest specific power of any contemporary street-legal naturally-aspirated engine, and was also the lightest naturally-aspirated production V8 engine, weighing only 135 kilograms (298 lb).

The M18 has a distinct sound, partly attributable to its flat-plane crankshaft, but additionally due to it having a "top pipes" exhaust system. The M18 is a "Hot Side Inside" (HSI) design, with the intake ports on the cylinder heads facing outwards, and the exhaust ports mounted inwards, facing the other side of the cylinder block vee. The "top pipes" mean that the balance of the very short exhaust system is also mounted above the engine, exiting through the engine deck lid. Advantages of this arrangement include reduced weight, improved aerodynamics, and reduced back pressure. It also allows Porsche to more easily manage the heat output from the V8, and keep it from affecting the performance of the battery pack.

The M18 influenced the development of the 9RD engine used in the Porsche 963.

=== Applications ===
- Porsche 918 Spyder

== Type EA825 TT ==
EA825TT

Overview
- Manufacturer: Porsche
- Production: 2016–

Layout
- Configuration: 90° V8
- Displacement: 4.0 L (3,996 cc)
- Cylinder bore: 86 mm
- Piston stroke: 86 mm

Combustion
- Management: Bosch MG1CS008
- Oil system: Wet sump
- Cooling system: Water-cooled

Dimensions
- Dry weight: 231 kg (509 lb)

The Type EA825 V8 is the result of a collaboration between Porsche and Audi. It was the successor to the EA824, which was an Audi design and a further development of their earlier 4.2 TFSI V8.

The EA825 draws on the design of the Volkswagen-Audi Group's EA839 90 degree V6. Production took place at Porsche's engine facility in Zuffenhausen. Bore and stroke are identical at 86 mm (3.39 in), yielding an engine size of 4.0 L (3,996 cc; 243.9 cu in). The linerless cylinder block is of a eutectic aluminum-silicon alloy, and the bores have an iron coating deposited onto their surfaces. Forced induction is provided by two turbochargers mounted inside the vee of the block in a "Hot vee" configuration.

The EA825 TT was offered as a petrol engine option in both the second generation Panamera and third generation Cayenne in 2017. It became available as part of a hybrid petrol/electric powertrain in the Panamera in 2017, and in the Cayenne in 2019.

== Type 9RD ==
9RD
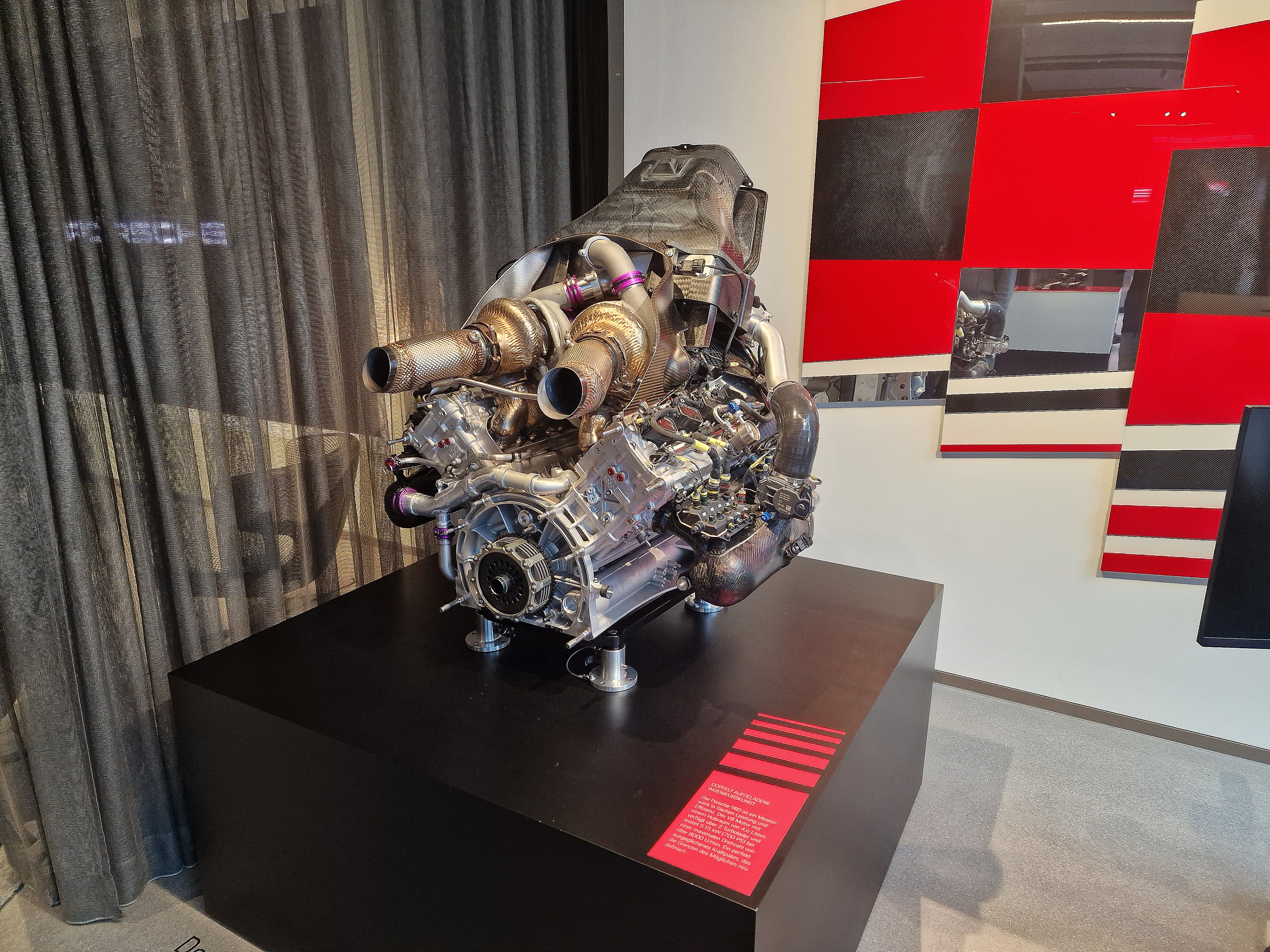

Overview
- Manufacturer: Porsche
- Production: 2023–2026

Layout
- Configuration: 90° V8
- Displacement: 4.6 L (4,593 cc)
- Cylinder bore: 95 mm
- Piston stroke: 81 mm
- Cylinder block material: Aluminum
- Cylinder head material: Aluminum
- Valvetrain: DOHC, 4 valves/cyl.

Combustion
- Turbocharger: Dual Van der Lee
- Oil system: Dry sump
- Cooling system: Water-cooled

For the 963 Le Mans Daytona hybrid LMDh class car, Porsche developed another V8 engine called the Type 9RD. Its most recent antecedent was the M18 used in the Porsche 918 Spyder, with which it shared about 80% of its components, but the engine's lineage goes all the way back to the MR6. Like the M18, the 9RD displaces 4.6-litres, and is part of a hybrid powertrain that produces 500 kW (671 hp) total. The engine weighs 180 kilograms (400 lb). Unlike the naturally aspirated M18, the 9RD has a low-pressure twin turbo system by Van der Lee mounted inside the 90-degree engine's cylinder bank vee.

=== Applications ===
- Porsche 963

== See also ==
- Porsche flat-eight engines
- Ruf RGT-8
