= Porsche 2708 =

Porsche open-wheel racing car

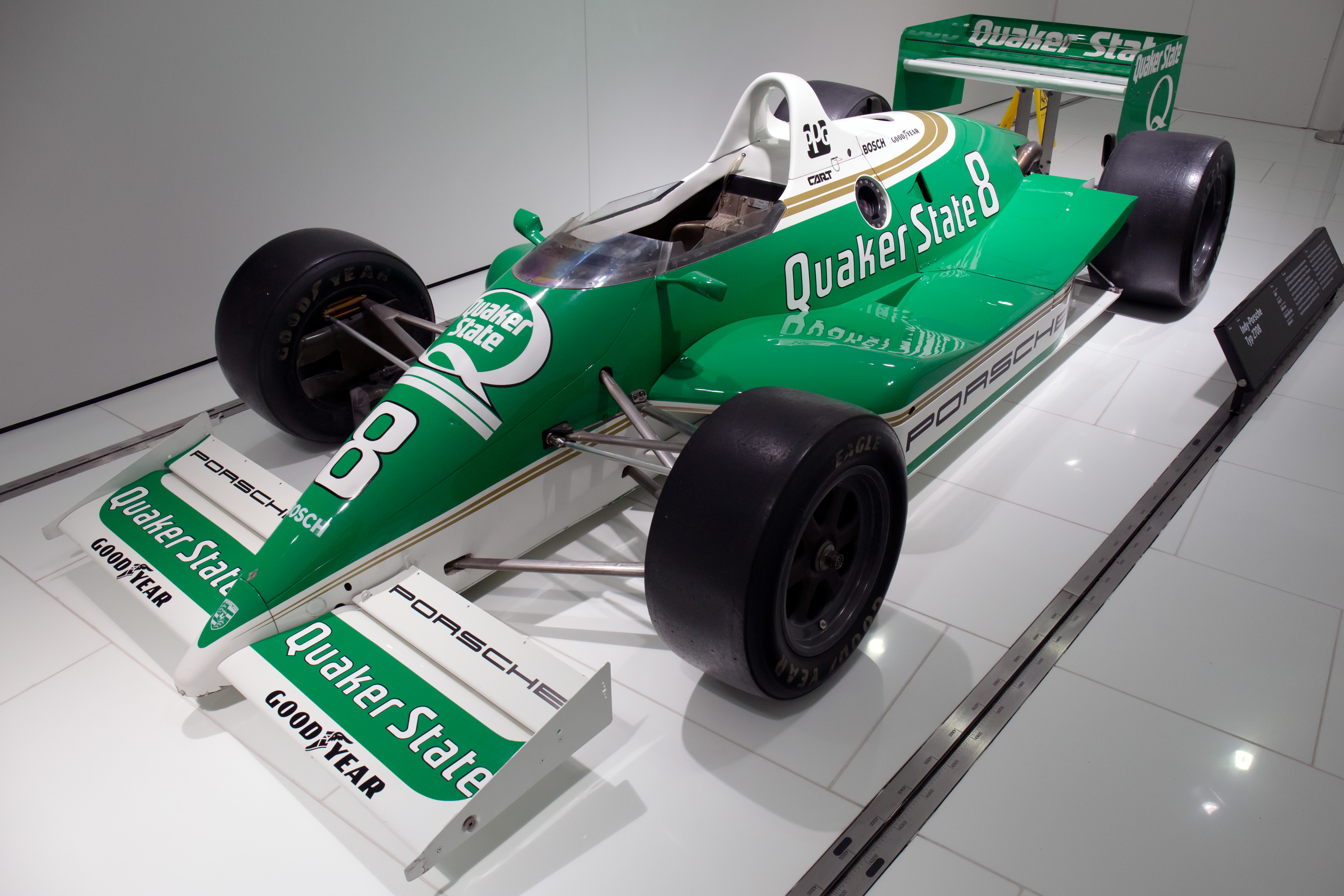
- Category: IndyCar
- Constructor: Porsche
- Designer: Norbert Singer

Technical specifications
- Chassis: Aluminium/plastic sandwich monocoque
- Length: 4,660 mm (183 in)
- Width: 2,010 mm (79 in)
- Height: 980 mm (39 in)
- Wheelbase: 2,800 or 2,850 mm (110 or 112 in)
- Engine: Porsche 9M0 2.65 L (2,649 cc; 161.65 cu in) V8 Turbocharged
- Power: 750 hp (560 kW)
- Weight: 1,550 lb (700 kg)
- Fuel: Methanol (Shell)
- Tires: Goodyear

Competition history
Races	Wins	Poles	F/Laps
0	0	0	0

The Porsche 2708 is an open-wheel race car developed and fielded by Porsche in CART Indy car racing from 1987 to 1990.

== History ==
=== 1987/1988: Porsche chassis ===
Porsche entered American CART racing late in 1987 with a new car created specifically for the series. This was a new, all-Porsche design, with an aluminum-plastic monocoque chassis developed by Norbert Singer and a V8 engine developed by Hans Mezger. The Type 9M0 engine is a load-bearing element of the chassis. The engine has a single turbocharger, and is fueled by methanol, as per CART regulations.

Al Holbert, who had won Le Mans three times in a Porsche 956 sports car and was fourth in the Indianapolis 500 in 1984, was chosen to head up the team and serve as a test driver. Holbert died in a plane crash in September 1988. Another driver was 1987 Indy winner Al Unser, who was 49 years old at the time. Early on, the car was disappointing on both high-speed ovals and road courses. In Indianapolis, Teo Fabi and his green and white Quaker State March/Porsche qualified seventeenth, but retired after thirty laps with a wheel failure.

One of the three vehicles built is on loan to the Cité de l'Automobile - Musée National - Collection Schlumpf in Mühlhausen, but belongs to the Porsche Museum in Zuffenhausen. One is now part of the permanent exhibition "Success story: Porsche Motorsport" in the EFA Museum for German automobile history in Amerang / Chiemgau.

=== 1989/1990: March chassis ===
With the exceptions of Penske Racing and AAR Eagle, most CART teams at the time did not build their own cars, but bought a chassis from a constructor like Lola, and then fitted it with an engine from Chevrolet, Ford-Cosworth, Judd, or Buick. Porsche opted for March Engineering, manufacturer of the CART championship car from 1986 and 1987 and a five-time Indy winner with Cosworth engines. The March 89 was adapted to the Porsche engine and called the 89 P, which is why the vehicle ran as the March-Porsche 89 P until the end of its use in 1990.

Fabi qualified thirteenth in Indy in 1989, but retired after 23 laps with an engine failure.

In 1990 John Andretti joined the team, and started in tenth place at the 1990 Indianapolis 500. The two car team, now trimmed in blue to reflect new sponsorship from Foster's Lager, managed over two-thirds of the distance of approximately 800 km (500 mi), but retired due to an accident and gearbox damage.

Porsche's largely unsuccessful involvement in the CART series ended late in 1990, although it did produce Porsche's first Indy Car victory - that of Fabi on September 3, 1989, at the Mid-Ohio Sports Car Course. Porsche's attention soon turned to another single-seater project with the naturally aspirated Porsche 3512 V12 in the Footwork FA12 in Formula 1.

A total of 15 copies of the Porsche 2708 and March-Porsche 89 P were produced. A blue number 4 is at the Boxenstop Automobile and Toy Cars Museum in Tübingen, Germany.

== Technical Data ==
Porsche 2708 specifications
Feature	Detail
Engine	Porsche V8 with single turbocharger
Bore × stroke	88.2 mm × 54.2 mm (3.5 in × 2.1 in)
Displacement	2.65 L (2,649 cc; 161.65 cu in)
Power	749 PS (551 kW) at 11,200 rpm (1989/90)
Torque	343 lb⋅ft (465 N⋅m) at 8,500 rpm
Compression ratio	12.0:1
Valvetrain	Four valves per cylinder, DOHC, gear-driven
Cooling	Water-cooled
Transmission	6-speed manual transmission
Brakes	Disc brakes
Front suspension	Double wishbone suspension, inboard springs and dampers
Rear suspension	Double wishbone suspension, inboard springs and dampers
Chassis	Monocoque
Track width (front/rear)	1,710 / 1,620 mm (67.3 / 63.8 in)
Wheelbase	2,800 or 2,850 mm (110.2 or 112.2 in)
Tires	Goodyear 9.5"/25"–15" (front), 14.5"/27"–15" (rear)
Length; Width; Height	4,660 mm (183.5 in); 2,010 mm (79.1 in); 980 mm (38.6 in)
Weight	703 kg (1,549.8 lb)
Top speed	360 km/h (224 mph)

== Gallery ==
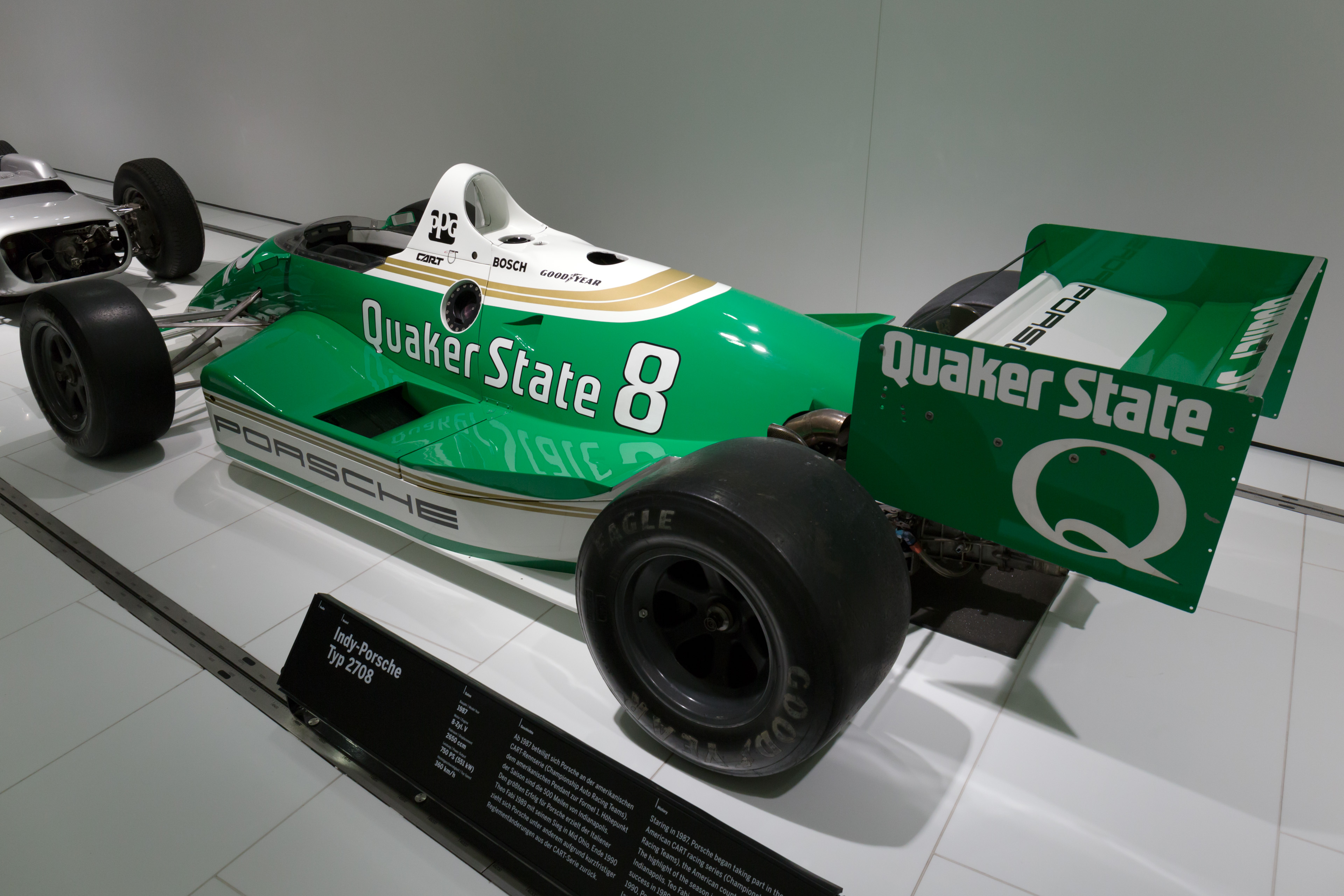
Porsche 2708 at the Porsche Museum

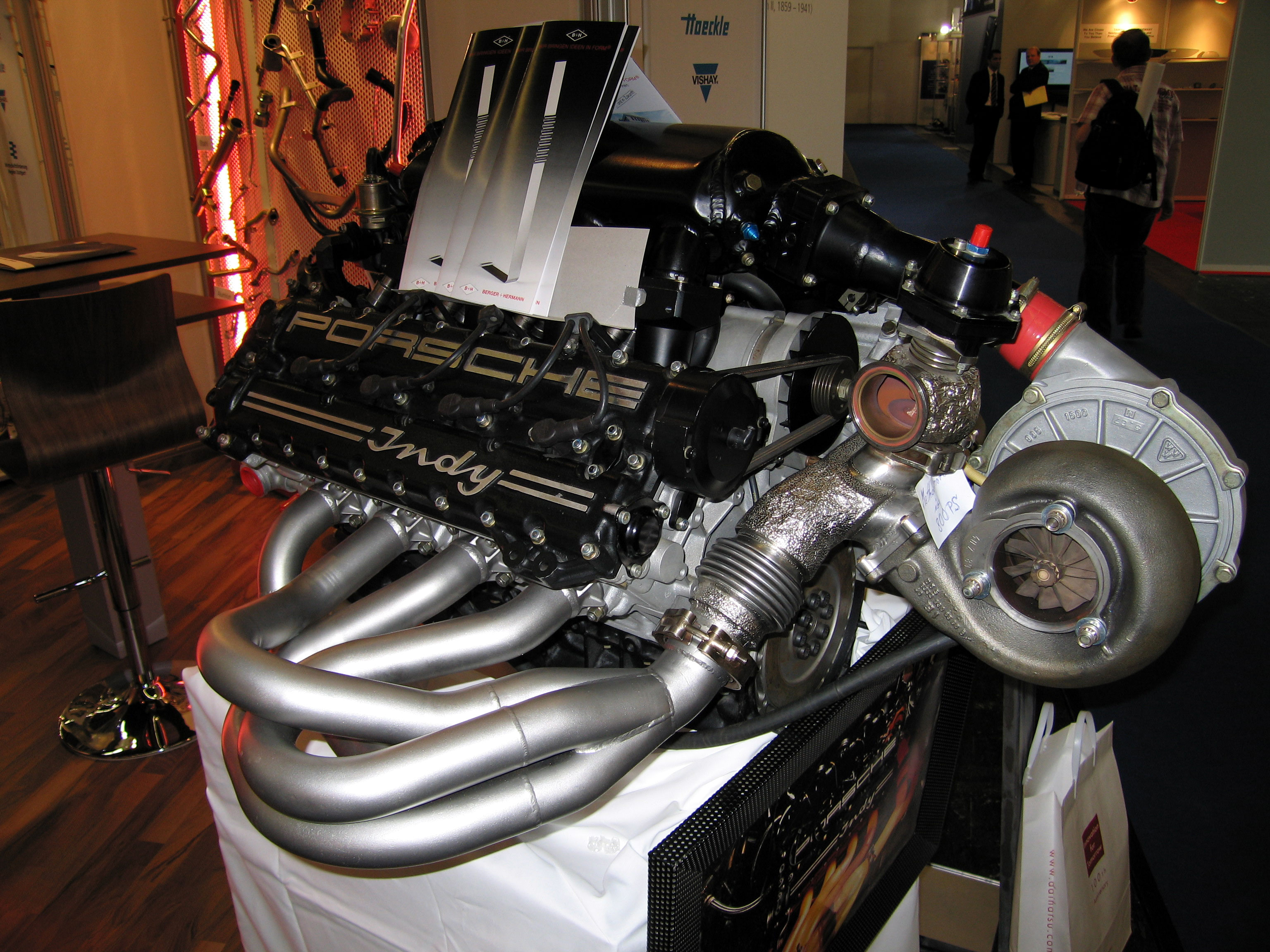
Porsche Type 9M0 engine

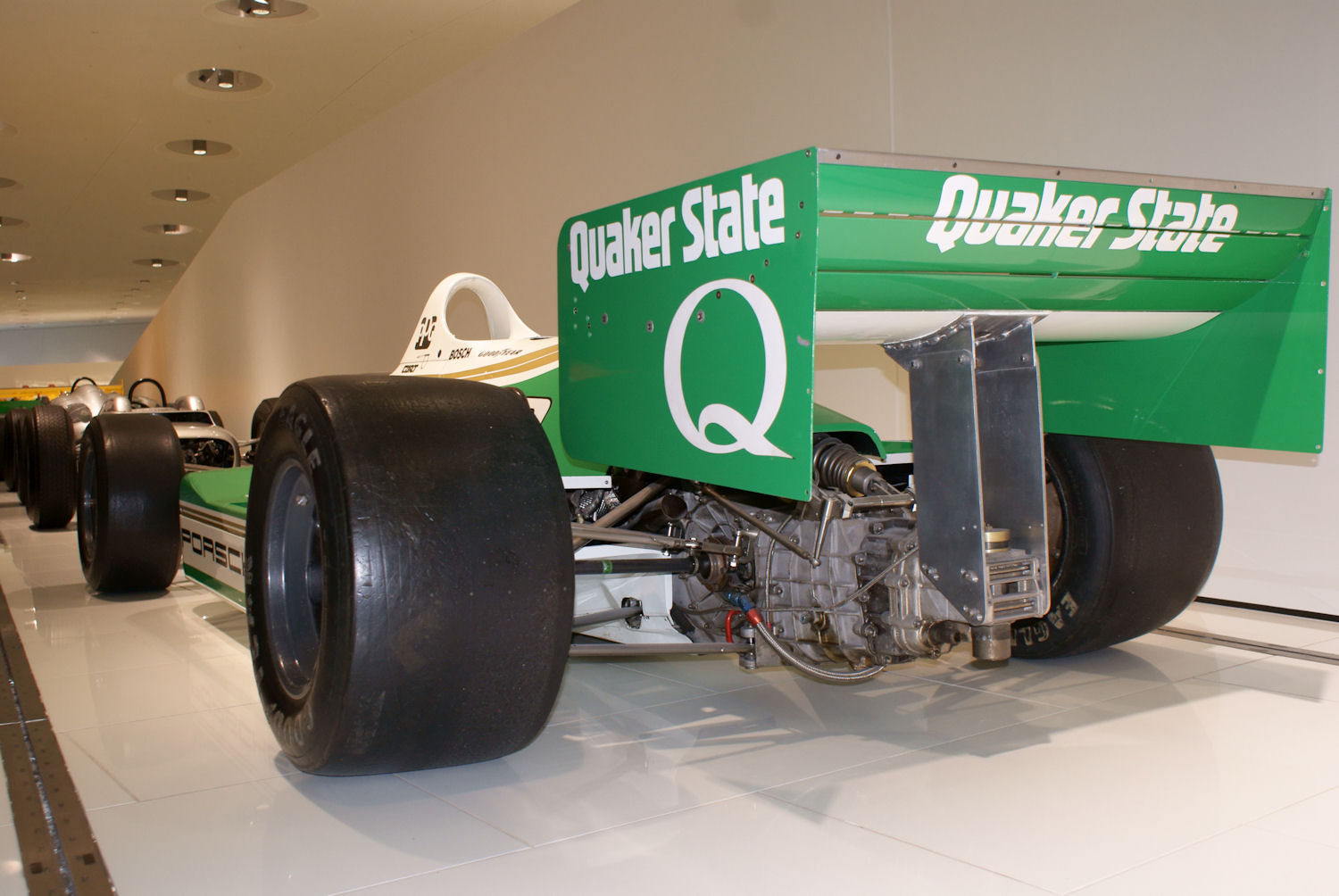
Porsche 2708
