= Porsche Indy V8 engine =

Porsche 9M0 Indy V8
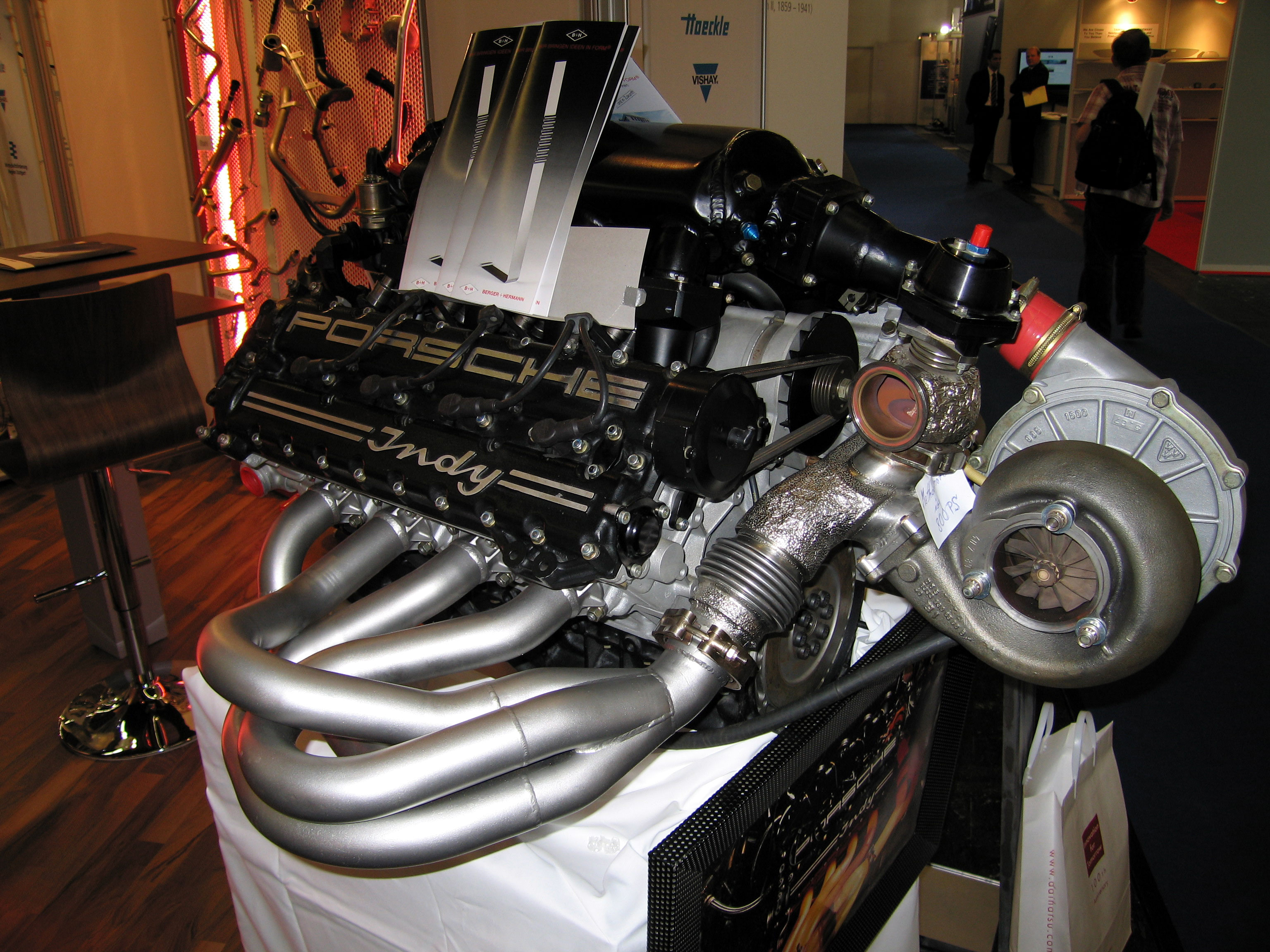

Overview
- Manufacturer: Porsche
- Designer: Hans Mezger
- Production: 1987–1990

Layout
- Configuration: 90° V8
- Displacement: 2.65 L (2,649 cc; 161.65 cu in)
- Cylinder bore: 88.2 mm (3.47 in)
- Piston stroke: 54.2 mm (2.13 in)
- Valvetrain: 32-valve, DOHC, four-valves per cylinder

Combustion
- Turbocharger: KKK
- Fuel system: Mechanical multi-point fuel injection
- Fuel type: Methanol
- Oil system: Dry sump

Output
- Power output: 749 PS (551 kW) at 11,200 rpm
- Torque output: 343 lb⋅ft (465 N⋅m) at 8,500 rpm

The Porsche Typ 9M0 is a 90° four-stroke turbocharged 2.65-liter V8 Indy car racing engine that was designed, developed, and produced by Porsche. It ran in the CART PPG Indy Car World Series from late 1987 to 1990. The engine was used in the Porsche 2708, and later in various cars from March Engineering.

== Applications ==
- Porsche 2708
- March 88C
- March 89P
- March 90P
