= Giupponi Franca =

Brazilian race car driver

José Giupponi Franca
- Nationality: (Brazil) Brazilian
- Born: 12 October 1950

Formula Super Vee
- Best finish: 31st in 1985

Giupponi Franca is a Brazilian race car driver who competed in the Formula Super Vee and attempted to qualify for two Indycar races in 1988. In the 1985 Super Vee season, Franca finished 31st in points.

== Motorsports Career Results ==
=== American Open-Wheel ===
(key)

==== CART ====
Year	Team	1	2	3	4	5	6	7	8	9	10	11	12	13	14	15	Rank	Points	Ref
1988	GF Racing	PHX	LBH	INDY	MIL	POR	CLE	TOR	MEA	MIC	POC	MDO; DNQ	ROA	NAZ	LAG; DNQ	MIA	NR	0	
