= 1993 Michigan 500 =

Coordinates: 42°03′58.68″N 84°14′29.18″W

(United States) 1993 Michigan 500
Race details
- Race 10 of 16 in the 1993 CART season
- Date: August 1, 1993
- Official name: 1993 Marlboro 500
- Location: Michigan International Speedway, Brooklyn, Michigan, United States
- Course: Permanent racing facility 2.000 mi / 3.219 km
- Distance: 250 laps 500.000 mi / 804.672 km
- Weather: Partly Cloudy with temperatures up to 87 °F (31 °C); wind speeds reaching up to 14 miles per hour (23 km/h)

Pole position
- Driver: (United States) Mario Andretti (Newman-Haas Racing)
- Time: 234.275 mph (377.029 km/h)

Podium
- First: (United Kingdom) Nigel Mansell (Newman-Haas Racing)
- Second: (United States) Mario Andretti (Newman-Haas Racing)
- Third: (Netherlands) Arie Luyendyk (Chip Ganassi Racing)

The 1993 Michigan 500, the thirteenth running of the event, was held at the Michigan International Speedway in Brooklyn, Michigan, on Sunday, August 1, 1993. Branded as the 1993 Marlboro 500 for sponsorship reasons, the race was won by Nigel Mansell, his only Michigan 500 win. The event was race number 10 of 16 of the 1993 PPG Indy Car World Series.

== Background ==
During the offseason, four-time Indy 500 winner Rick Mears announced his retirement from racing. Mears' last victory in Indy car came in the 1991 Michigan 500. Penske driver Paul Tracy was elevated into the ride, taking over full-time after finishing second in the 1992 Michigan 500.

The biggest story going into the season surrounded Newman/Haas Racing. Michael Andretti left the CART series and signed with McLaren to drive in Formula One. Taking Andretti's place would be reigning Formula One World Champion Nigel Mansell. Mansell came to the American open wheel series with considerable fanfare and huge media attention. Mansell joined fellow former World Driving champion Mario Andretti as teammates. Mansell won the CART season-opener at Surfers Paradise. At the 1993 Indianapolis 500, Mansell finished third.

On Friday, July 30, the head of Ford's Director of Special Vehicle Operations, Michael Kranefuss announced he would step down from his position and start his own racing team. Kranefuss was instrumental in Ford's return to Indy Car racing in 1992.

On Sunday, August 1, Academy Award-winning actor Gene Hackman announced he had become a part-owner of the Galles Racing team and intended to attend all Indy car races in 1994.

== Practice and Time Trials ==
For the first time, the Michigan 500 had a reduced schedule of only three days of on-track activity. Practice began on Friday, July 30. Nigel Mansell posted the fastest practice speed at 231.120 mph. Teammate Mario Andretti was second fastest at 230.664 mph.

Mansell was unapproving of the bumpy asphalt surface, saying, "It's very impressive to average 230 mph on any track, but I must confess, it's the bumpiest circuit I've driven anywhere in the world. I'm certainly not happy and don't mind voicing it. They (drivers) asked for the track to be resurfaced a year ago. Nothing was done. When someone gets killed it's too late."

Mansell walked back his comments on Sunday, saying, "The track itself is a fantastic circuit. It stands alone. As an oval, it's totally different to Indianapolis. It's tremendous. I'd just like it to be smoother, that's all."

Danny Sullivan was sick with Giardiasis. Adrián Fernández practiced Sullivan's car and was 12th fastest. With two minutes left in practice, Fernandez scraped the wall and suffered significant damage to the right side, necessitating a backup car.

Qualifying was held on Saturday. Nigel Mansell made his qualifying run early and posted a lap of 233.462 mph. Later in the session, 53 year-old Mario Andretti ran a lap of 234.275 mph to take the pole away from his teammate. At the time, it was the fastest speed ever run in an Indy car. Andretti had also won the pole for the first Indy car race at Michigan in 1968, 25 years earlier.

Danny Sullivan decided he was too ill to drive in the Michigan 500 and returned to his home. Adrian Fernandez qualified Sullivan's backup car 20th fastest, but the car was withdrawn from the race. Team owner Rick Galles said he never intended for the inexperienced Fernandez to race in the Michigan 500.

On Saturday, the International Race of Champions competed at Michigan. Geoff Brabham won the 100 mile race. Davey Allison posthumously won the championship after he lost his life on July 13. Al Unser Jr. and Arie Luyendyk were the only two drivers to compete in IROC and the Michigan 500.

== Race ==
Spectators estimates ranged between 60,000 and near 70,000 for the Michigan 500. That marked a sizable increase since the crowds of 50,000 in the 1991 Michigan 500.

From the start, Mario Andretti took the lead and led the first 27 laps. On lap 28, Nigel Mansell caught his teammate and made the pass for the lead on the outside of Andretti in turns one and two.

Stefan Johansson crashed exiting turn four on lap 37. When the race restarted, Mansell continued his domination. He lapped fifth-place Arie Luyendyk on lap 76, fourth-place Scott Goodyear on lap 90, third-place Andretti on lap 95, and second-place Raul Boesel on lap 101.

Paul Tracy blew an engine and brought out the second caution on lap 119. When Mansell took a more conservative pace, Andretti was able to unlap himself on lap 145. The bumpy surface was taking its toll on Mansell. On his final pit stop, he asked for an aspirin pain reliever.

Marco Greco brought out the third and final caution on lap 206 when he blew an engine. For the lap 212 restart, Andretti was now close to Mansell's rear wing, but Mansell's car was too fast and he pulled away from Andretti. Mansell won the Michigan 500 by 9.434 seconds. He led 222 of the 250 laps. It was his third victory of the year and propelled him into the Indycar points lead.

An exhausted Mansell had to be helped from his car, but was joyous over his first 500-mile race victory. "This stands alone," he said. "I've never been in a race like this with the G-loading and passing. It's tougher than 120 degrees in Brazil and I'm beat. But this is one of the greatest victories of my career."

Ford engines led every lap and swept the top-five finishing positions. It was the first win for Ford in a 500-mile Indycar race since Joe Leonard won the California 500 in 1971.

== Box score ==
Finish	Grid	No	Name	Team	Chassis	Engine	Laps	Time/Status	Led	Points
1	2	5	(United Kingdom) Nigel Mansell	Newman/Haas Racing	Lola T93/00	Ford-Cosworth	250	2:39:24.131	222	21
2	1	6	(United States) Mario Andretti	Newman/Haas Racing	Lola T93/00	Ford-Cosworth	250	+9.434	27	17
3	3	10	(Netherlands) Arie Luyendyk	Chip Ganassi Racing	Lola T93/00	Ford-Cosworth	249	+1 Lap	1	14
4	4	9	(Brazil) Raul Boesel	Dick Simon Racing	Lola T93/00	Ford-Cosworth	248	+2 Laps	0	12
5	6	2	(Canada) Scott Goodyear	Walker Racing	Lola T93/00	Ford-Cosworth	247	+3 Laps	0	10
6	8	8	(Italy) Teo Fabi	Hall-VDS Racing	Lola T93/00	Ilmor-Chevrolet	246	+4 Laps	0	8
7	11	40	(Colombia) Roberto Guerrero	Budweiser King Racing	Lola T93/00	Ilmor-Chevrolet	245	+5 Laps	0	6
8	17	3	(United States) Al Unser Jr.	Galles Racing	Lola T93/00	Ilmor-Chevrolet	245	+5 Laps	0	5
9	16	1	(United States) Bobby Rahal	Rahal-Hogan Racing	Lola T93/00	Ilmor-Chevrolet	243	+7 Laps	0	4
10	13	75	(United States) Willy T. Ribbs	Walker Racing	Lola T92/00	Ford-Cosworth	243	+7 Laps	0	3
11	7	22	(United States) Scott Brayton	Dick Simon Racing	Lola T93/00	Ford-Cosworth	241	+9 Laps	0	2
12	19	42	(United States) Dave Kudrave	Euromotorsport	Lola T92/00	Ilmor-Chevrolet	239	+11 Laps	0	1
13	15	4	(Brazil) Emerson Fittipaldi	Marlboro Team Penske	Penske PC-22	Ilmor-Chevrolet	237	+13 Laps	0	0
14	12	15	(Japan) Hiro Matsushita	Walker Racing	Lola T93/00	Ford-Cosworth	231	+19 Laps	0	0
15	9	14	(United States) Robby Gordon	A. J. Foyt Enterprises	Lola T93/00	Ford-Cosworth	229	Engine	0	0
16	23	39	(Canada) Ross Bentley	Dale Coyne Racing	Lola T92/00	Ilmor-Chevrolet	222	+28 Laps	0	0
17	20	29	(France) Olivier Grouillard	Indy Regency Racing	Lola T92/00	Ilmor-Chevrolet	184	Engine	0	0
18	21	30	(Brazil) Marco Greco	Sovereign Racing	Lola T92/00	Ilmor-Chevrolet	163	Engine	0	0
19	5	12	(Canada) Paul Tracy	Marlboro Team Penske	Penske PC-22	Ilmor-Chevrolet	114	Engine	0	0
20	22	50	(United States) Jeff Wood	Euromotorsport	Lola T91/00	Cosworth	52	Handling	0	0
21	18	20	(United States) Buddy Lazier	Leader Card Racers	Lola T92/00	Buick	43	Oil pressure	0	0
22	10	90	(United States) Lyn St. James	Dick Simon Racing	Lola T93/00	Ford-Cosworth	39	Electrical	0	0
23	14	16	(Sweden) Stefan Johansson	Bettenhausen Motorsports	Penske PC-22	Ilmor-Chevrolet	36	Crash	0	0

=== Race statistics ===
Lap Leaders
Laps	Leader
1–27	Mario Andretti
28-82	Nigel Mansell
83	Arie Luyendyk
84–250	Nigel Mansell

Cautions: 3 for 24 laps
Laps	Reason
38–45	Stefan Johansson crash turn 4
119–127	Paul Tracy tow-in
206–212	Marco Greco engine

== Standings after the race ==
Drivers' Championship standings

Pos	Driver	Points
1	(United Kingdom) Nigel Mansell	123
2	(Brazil) Emerson Fittipaldi	105
3	(Brazil) Raul Boesel	98
4	(United States) Mario Andretti	97
5	(Canada) Paul Tracy	83

== Broadcasting ==
The Michigan 500 was broadcast live on television by ABC. Paul Page was the lead announcer and was joined by Bobby Unser and Sam Posey as color commentators.
