= 1992 Michigan 500 =

Coordinates: 42°03′58.68″N 84°14′29.18″W

(United States) 1992 Michigan 500
Race details
- Race 10 of 16 in the 1992 CART season
- Date: August 2, 1992
- Official name: 1992 Marlboro 500
- Location: Michigan International Speedway, Brooklyn, Michigan, United States
- Course: Permanent racing facility 2.000 mi / 3.219 km
- Distance: 250 laps 500.000 mi / 804.672 km
- Weather: Partly Cloudy with temperatures up to 78 °F (26 °C); wind speeds reaching up to 18 miles per hour (29 km/h)

Pole position
- Driver: (United States) Mario Andretti (Newman-Haas Racing)
- Time: 230.15 mph (370.39 km/h)

Podium
- First: (Canada) Scott Goodyear (Walker Racing)
- Second: (Canada) Paul Tracy (Team Penske)
- Third: (Brazil) Raul Boesel (Dick Simon Racing)

The 1992 Michigan 500, the twelfth running of the event, was held at the Michigan International Speedway in Brooklyn, Michigan, on Sunday, August 2, 1992. Branded as the 1992 Marlboro 500 for sponsorship reasons, the race was won by Scott Goodyear, his first Indy Car victory. It was the first time a Canadian won a 500-mile Indy Car race. The race was also the last race of Rick Mears' racing career. The event was race number 10 of 16 in the 1992 PPG Indy Car World Series.

== Background ==
After years of Chevrolet engine domination in IndyCar, the 1992 season marked the return of Ford to the Indy car ranks. The Ford Cosworth XB was introduced to replace the aging DFX and the lesser-used DFS. It quickly became an engine of choice, and for 1992, was the powerplant for Newman/Haas Racing and Chip Ganassi Racing. For 1992, Ilmor introduced an updated motor (the 265-B), badged as the "Chevrolet-B", and it was fielded by Penske Racing singly. The rest of the Chevrolet teams utilized the existing Ilmor (265-A), now being referred to as the "Chevy-A".

In the 1992 Indianapolis 500, Al Unser Jr. beat Scott Goodyear by 0.043 seconds, the closest finish in Indy history. At Indianapolis, Rick Mears suffered a broken wrist in practice.

== Practice and Time Trials ==
The first day of practice on Thursday, July 30, was canceled because of rain.

Rains again delayed track activity on Friday. A shortened practice session before qualifying had Michael Andretti as the fastest speed at 230.2 mph. His father Mario Andretti was second quickest at 229.9 mph.

52 year-old Mario Andretti won the pole for the Marlboro 500 with a speed of 230.150 mph. It was Mario's first Indy car pole since 1987 and set the record for oldest driver to win a pole. Second place was Michael Andretti with a speed of 230.056 mph. Chip Ganassi Racing teammates Eddie Cheever and Arie Luyendyk completed the second row. 19 cars posted speeds in round one.

Saturday's second round of qualifying saw only one driver post a speed. Jon Beekhuis qualified in the 20th starting spot. Without setting qualifying speeds, Steve Chassey, George Snider, Ross Bentley, and Eric Bachelart were added to the starting field based on practice speeds.

On Saturday, the International Race of Champions competed at Michigan. Geoff Brabham won the 100 mile race. Al Unser Jr., Scott Pruett, and Arie Luyendyk were the only three drivers to compete in IROC and the Michigan 500.

== Race ==
An estimated 55,000 spectators attended the race, a 10% increase from the year before.

At the start, Michael Andretti took the lead from the outside of the front row. The caution came out on lap two for debris. Andretti led the first 48 laps.

Running second on lap 36, Eddie Cheever crashed in turn two. Leading the race on lap 49, Michael Andretti slowed and entered the pits. He retired from the race with ignition failure. The lead was assumed by his father Mario, who led for the next 38 laps.

Scott Goodyear climbed from the ninth starting position and passed Mario Andretti for the lead on lap 87. Running two laps down on lap 92, Rick Mears pulled into the pits and retired from the race, suffering severe pain from his broken wrist suffered at Indianapolis. Unbeknownst to all, it was the last race of Mears' career, as he soon underwent surgery to repair his wrist and retired from auto racing in December 1992 during the Team Penske Christmas party.

Running a part-time schedule for Team Penske, Paul Tracy took the lead for the first time when Goodyear was slowed by lapped traffic on lap 101. After green flag pit stops, Goodyear repassed Tracy on lap 110 and led for the next 65 laps. After leading 38 laps, Mario Andretti retired from the race after 122 laps with engine failure.

Paul Tracy retook the lead on lap 175 and held it for the next 58 laps. Tracy extended his lead over Goodyear to 13.2 seconds by lap 220. At that moment, Scott Brayton crashed in turn three.

After the debris from Brayton's crash was cleaned up, the race restarted on lap 231. Two laps later, Goodyear pulled to the outside of Tracy in turn two. They raced side-by-side down the backstretch before Goodyear pulled ahead in turn three.

Goodyear led the final 18 laps and won by 5.932 seconds over Tracy. The win was the first for Scott Goodyear and also the first for the team owned by Derrick Walker.

Immediately after the race, fourth-place finisher Al Unser Jr. went to confront Tracy over blocks he deemed dangerous. "I just wanted to tell Paul that he can't move over on anybody down the straightaway at any of the ovals. He moved over on Scott (Goodyear) and tried to block him and then tried to block Boesel and tried to block me. I wanted to teach him and make him learn that you can't do that at 200 (m.p.h.) on these ovals because you'll end up hurting somebody very badly. It's a closed issue. I think Paul understands now."

== Box score ==
Finish	Grid	No	Name	Team	Chassis	Engine	Laps	Time/Status	Led	Points
1	9	15	(Canada) Scott Goodyear	Walker Racing	Lola T92/00	Chevy-A	250	2:48:53.699; 177.625 mph	97	21
2	6	7	(Canada) Paul Tracy	Marlboro Team Penske	Penske PC-21	Chevy-B	250	+5.932	67	16
3	8	11	(Brazil) Raul Boesel	Dick Simon Racing	Lola T92/00	Chevy-A	249	+1 Lap	0	14
4	15	3	(United States) Al Unser Jr.	Galles-Kraco Racing	Galmer G92	Chevy-A	249	+1 Lap	0	12
5	11	10	(United States) Scott Pruett	Truesports	Truesports 92C	Chevy-A	249	+1 Lap	0	10
6	14	8	(United States) John Andretti	Hall-VDS Racing	Lola T92/00	Chevy-A	249	+1 Lap	0	8
7	18	21	(United States) Buddy Lazier	Hemelgarn Racing	Lola T91/00	Buick-V6	236	+14 Laps	0	6
8	16	18	(United States) Danny Sullivan	Galles-Kraco Racing	Galmer G92	Chevy-A	233	+17 Laps	0	5
9	17	16	(United States) Tony Bettenhausen Jr.	Bettenhausen Motorsports	Penske PC-20	Chevy-A	232	+18 Laps	0	4
10	13	22	(United States) Scott Brayton	Dick Simon Racing	Lola T92/00	Chevy-A	214	Crash T3	0	3
11	12	12	(United States) Bobby Rahal	Rahal-Hogan Racing	Lola T92/00	Chevy-A	181	Overheating	0	2
12	19	30	(United States) Jeff Wood	Arciero Racing	Lola T91/00	Buick-V6	144	Fire	0	1
13	7	5	(Brazil) Emerson Fittipaldi	Marlboro Team Penske	Penske PC-21	Chevy-B	133	Handling	0	0
14	4	6	(Netherlands) Arie Luyendyk	Chip Ganassi Racing	Lola T92/00	Ford-Cosworth XB	131	Clutch	0	0
15	1	2	(United States) Mario Andretti	Newman/Haas Racing	Lola T92/00	Ford-Cosworth XB	122	Engine	38	1
16	5	4	(United States) Rick Mears	Marlboro Team Penske	Penske PC-21	Chevy-B	92	Driver injury (wrist)	0	0
17	10	14	(United States) Pancho Carter	A. J. Foyt Enterprises	Lola T91/00	Chevy-A	73	Transmission	0	0
18	2	1	(United States) Michael Andretti	Newman/Haas Racing	Lola T92/00	Ford-Cosworth XB	49	Ignition	48	0
19	21	42	(United States) Steve Chassey	Euromotorsport	Lola T90/00	Cosworth DFS	36	Engine	0	0
20	3	9	(United States) Eddie Cheever	Chip Ganassi Racing	Lola T92/00	Ford-Cosworth XB	35	Crash T2	0	0
21	20	17	(United States) Jon Beekhuis	Walker Racing	Lola T91/00	Chevy-A	33	Clutch	0	0
22	24	19	(Belgium) Éric Bachelart	Dale Coyne Racing	Lola T90/00	Cosworth DFS	22	Handling	0	0
23	23	39	(Canada) Ross Bentley	Dale Coyne Racing	Lola T90/00	Cosworth DFS	7	Transmission	0	0
24	22	50	(United States) George Snider	Euromotorsport	Lola T91/00	Cosworth DFS	6	Manifold	0	0

=== Race statistics ===
Lap Leaders
Laps	Leader
1–48	Michael Andretti
49–86	Mario Andretti
87–100	Scott Goodyear
101–109	Paul Tracy
110–174	Scott Goodyear
175–232	Paul Tracy
233–250	Scott Goodyear

Cautions: 5 for 38 laps
Laps	Reason
2–4	Debris
36–43	Eddie Cheever crash turn 2
65–69	Debris
134–142	Debris
220–230	Scott Brayton crash turn 3

== Broadcasting ==
The Michigan 500 was broadcast live on television by ABC. Paul Page was the lead announcer and was joined by Bobby Unser and Sam Posey as color commentators. The pit lane reporters were Gary Gerould and Jack Arute.
