= 1991 Michigan 500 =

Coordinates: 42°03′58.68″N 84°14′29.18″W

(United States) 1991 Michigan 500
Race details
- Race 11 of 17 in the 1991 CART season
- Date: August 4, 1991
- Official name: 1991 Marlboro 500
- Location: Michigan International Speedway, Brooklyn, Michigan, United States
- Course: Permanent racing facility 2.000 mi / 3.219 km
- Distance: 250 laps 500.000 mi / 804.672 km
- Weather: Partly Cloudy with temperatures up to 81 °F (27 °C); wind speeds reaching up to 18 miles per hour (29 km/h)

Pole position
- Driver: (United States) Rick Mears (Team Penske)
- Time: 225.169 mph (362.374 km/h)

Podium
- First: (United States) Rick Mears (Team Penske)
- Second: (Netherlands) Arie Luyendyk (Granatelli Racing)
- Third: (United States) Al Unser Jr. (Galles Racing)

The 1991 Marlboro 500, the eleventh running of the event, was held at the Michigan International Speedway in Brooklyn, Michigan, on Sunday, August 4, 1991. Branded as the 1991 Marlboro 500 for sponsorship reasons, the race was won by Rick Mears, his final Indy Car victory. It was also Mears' only win in the Michigan 500. The event was race number 11 of 17 in the 1991 CART PPG Indy Car World Series.

== Background ==
In May, Rick Mears won the Indianapolis 500 for a record-tying fourth time.

By 1991, the Chevy Indy V-8 engine had won every Indy car race since September 1989. The dominant engine was necessary for teams to compete for wins. Entering the Michigan 500, Ilmor announced they had approved engine leases for 1992 for the Dick Simon-owned car of Hiro Matsushita and deny leases to Patrick Racing and Truesports. Some believed the denials for the teams were political. In 1989, Patrick Racing left Chevrolet for Alfa Romeo and sent a Chevrolet engine to Alfa Romeo to copy for development. Truesports had led the development of the Judd engine. The controversy over who was allowed to lease engines was called "an embarrassment to CART" by journalist Robin Miller.

== Practice and Time Trials ==
Practice began on Thursday, August 1. Emerson Fittipaldi set the fastest speed at 224.134 mph. Rick Mears was second fastest at 223.678 mph. Mario Andretti was third at 223.653 mph.

Arie Luyendyk was sidelined from practice after Total Petroleum obtained a restraining order to prevent his Vince Granatelli team from racing. Granatelli had partnered to co-own the team with Bob Tezak, a partnership that was dissolved in June. Granatelli pulled Total logos from the car, claiming their deal was with Tezak and not a part of the team going forward. Total demanded the logos remain on the car and went to court over it. Until the dispute was dissolved, Luyendyk and the team were forbidden from competing in IndyCar. Luyendyk was also suing Tezak for missed salary payments.

On Friday afternoon, Rick Mears won the pole at a speed of 225.169 mph, breaking the track record he set in the 1986 Michigan 500. The slowest qualifier was John Jones with a speed of 200.198 mph. Emerson Fittipaldi joined Mears on the front row.

A. J. Foyt suffered a blown engine in practice on Friday morning. His crew rushed to change the engine and was told he would be able to qualify at his drawn position. When the car was presented at the qualifying line, the crew was told they were too late and would have to go to the rear of the qualifying line, plus be penalized one of their two qualifying laps. Foyt called the penalty a "cheap shot" by CART. Foyt withdrew from the race and loaded his equipment back onto the hauler. After meetings with MIS track president Walt Czarnecki and CART President Johnny Capels, Foyt announced he would reconsider his participation in the event. On Saturday morning, Foyt announced he would compete.

A court hearing in a Detroit dissolved the restraining order and denied an injunction against the Granatelli team and allowed Luyendyk to begin activities on Saturday.

On Saturday morning practice, Jon Beekhuis crashed hard in turn three. Beekhuis was briefly knocked unconscious. He was transported to a local hospital where he was diagnosed with a broken right hand, badly bruised right thigh, and was released later that day. Beekhuis had qualified 12th for the race but withdrew from the event. Beekhuis was driving the same chassis that Willy T. Ribbs qualified at the Indianapolis 500.

In the second round of qualifying, Arie Luyendyk and A. J. Foyt qualified for the race. Luyendyk's speed was the seventh fastest of the race. Foyt's was the twelfth fastest speed.

On Saturday, the International Race of Champions competed at Michigan. Rusty Wallace won the 100 mile race. Al Unser Jr. and Scott Pruett were the only two drivers to compete in IROC and the Michigan 500.

On hand for the IROC race, NASCAR driver Bill Elliott tested the backup car Eddie Cheever Jr., owned by Chip Ganassi Racing on Saturday morning. After making adjustments, Elliott ran a lap of 210.760 mph.

== Race ==
21 cars started the race, the smallest 500 mile Indy car race since the 1916 Indianapolis 500, which also had 21 starters. The race also saw a then-record low attendance of 50,000 spectators. By comparison, the NASCAR Winston Cup race two months earlier attracted 90,000 spectators.

For the first time, the Michigan 500 was started with the cars lined up in rows of two instead of rows of three. Emerson Fittipaldi led the first lap but was overtaken by Mario and Michael Andretti on the backstretch on lap two. After starting 20th, Arie Luyendyk charged to 8th after two laps. Paul Tracy, in his debut race for Team Penske, crashed exiting turn four on lap three. Tracy suffered a broken left leg and underwent surgery to repair it later that night at Methodist Hospital in Indianapolis.

On the restart, Michael Andretti took the lead from his father. Shortly after, the caution came back out when John Andretti slowed on the backstretch. When racing resumed, Rick Mears took the lead.

Emerson Fittipaldi hit the wall in turn three and exited the race on lap 23. On the restart, Al Unser Jr. took the lead and paced the field for 17 laps. Michael Andretti retook the lead and built a sizable advantage. Between lap 53 and 132, Andretti led all but three laps.

The sixth caution came out on lap 125 when Scott Goodyear blew an engine and stopped on track. On the restart, Arie Luyendyk took the lead for the first time. Ten laps later, Michael Andretti blew an engine and fell out of the race. He had led a race high 82 laps. Luyendyk continued to lead with the exception of three laps during green flag pit stops.

On lap 183, Bobby Rahal blew an engine and brought out a caution flag. On the restart, Arie Luyendyk jumped the restart and passed the lapped car of John Andretti before the green flag waved. A trackside caution light was damaged by debris in the Tracy crash and Luyendyk was unable to judge when the green flag was waved. He was given a stop and go penalty. Mears extended his lead over Mario Andretti and Luyendyk.

After Eddie Cheever blew an engine and brought out the final caution flag, there was a 15 lap run to the finish. Mears held his advantage over Luyendyk by several seconds. With five laps remaining, Mario Andretti blew an engine and retired. He finished fourth.

Mears won his first Michigan 500 by 3.143 seconds over Luyendyk. Mears won $173,182, which pushed his career earnings above $10 million, the first IndyCar driver to reach that mark. Mears became the first driver since Gordon Johncock in 1982 to win both the Indianapolis 500 and Michigan 500 in the same year.

== Box score ==
Finish	Grid	No	Name	Team	Chassis	Engine	Laps	Time/Status	Led	Points
1	1	3	(United States) Rick Mears	Marlboro Team Penske	Penske PC-20	Ilmor-Chevrolet	250	2:59:23.650	71	21
2	20	9	(Netherlands) Arie Luyendyk	Vince Granatelli Racing	Lola T91/00	Ilmor-Chevrolet	250	+3.143	52	16
3	11	1	(United States) Al Unser Jr.	Galles-Kraco Racing	Lola T91/00	Ilmor-Chevrolet	246	+4 Laps	17	14
4	3	6	(United States) Mario Andretti	Newman/Haas Racing	Lola T91/00	Ilmor-Chevrolet	245	Engine	14	12
5	7	16	(United States) Tony Bettenhausen Jr.	Bettenhausen Motorsports	Penske PC-19	Ilmor-Chevrolet	245	+5 Laps	0	10
6	6	4	(United States) John Andretti	Hall-VDS Racing	Lola T91/00	Ilmor-Chevrolet	241	+9 Laps	0	8
7	13	8	(United States) Eddie Cheever	Chip Ganassi Racing	Lola T91/00	Ilmor-Chevrolet	226	Engine	0	6
8	19	12	(Canada) John Jones	Arciero Racing	Lola T89/00	Buick	220	+30 Laps	0	5
9	10	22	(United States) Scott Brayton	Dick Simon Racing	Lola T91/00	Ilmor-Chevrolet	219	+31 Laps	12	4
10	14	21	(United States) Pancho Carter	Leader Card Racers	Lola T90/00	Cosworth	187	Engine	0	3
11	4	18	(United States) Bobby Rahal	Galles-Kraco Racing	Lola T91/00	Ilmor-Chevrolet	182	Engine	1	2
12	16	86	(United States) Jeff Andretti	Bayside Motorsports	Lola T91/00	Cosworth	174	Oil line	0	1
13	12	11	(United States) Scott Pruett	Truesports	Truesports 91C	Judd	169	Clutch	0	0
14	5	2	(United States) Michael Andretti	Newman/Haas Racing	Lola T91/00	Ilmor-Chevrolet	143	Engine	82	1
15	15	15	(Canada) Scott Goodyear	Walker Racing	Lola T91/00	Judd	125	Engine	0	0
16	18	19	(United States) Randy Lewis	Dale Coyne Racing	Lola T90/00	Cosworth	93	Engine	0	0
17	21	14	(United States) A. J. Foyt	A. J. Foyt Enterprises	Lola T91/00	Ilmor-Chevrolet	61	Engine	0	0
18	17	20	(United States) Danny Sullivan	Patrick Racing	Lola T91/00	Alfa Romeo	48	Electrical	0	0
19	9	7	(Japan) Hiro Matsushita	Dick Simon Racing	Lola T91/00	Cosworth	41	Gearbox	0	0
20	2	5	(Brazil) Emerson Fittipaldi	Marlboro Team Penske	Penske PC-20	Ilmor-Chevrolet	22	Crash	1	0
21	8	17	(Canada) Paul Tracy	Marlboro Team Penske	Penske PC-19	Ilmor-Chevrolet	3	Crash	0	0

=== Race statistics ===
Lap Leaders
Laps	Leader
1	Emerson Fittipaldi
2–13	Mario Andretti
14–18	Michael Andretti
19–20	Mario Andretti
21–23	Rick Mears
24–35	Scott Brayton
36–52	Al Unser Jr.
53–64	Michael Andretti
65	Bobby Rahal
66–103	Michael Andretti
104–105	Rick Mears
106–132	Michael Andretti
133–166	Arie Luyendyk
167–169	Rick Mears
170–185	Arie Luyendyk
186–218	Rick Mears
219–220	Arie Luyendyk
221–250	Rick Mears

Cautions: 9 for 52 laps
Laps	Reason
3–13	Paul Tracy crash front straight
14–17	John Andretti slow on track
24–34	Emerson Fittipaldi crash turn 3
73–76	Jeff Andretti stalled on track
103–105	oil on track
130–132	Scott Goodyear stalled on track
143–145	Michael Andretti engine
183–190	Bobby Rahal engine
231–235	Eddie Cheever engine

== Broadcasting ==
The Michigan 500 was broadcast live on television by ABC. Paul Page was the lead announcer and was joined by Bobby Unser and Sam Posey as color commentators.
