= Jay Hill (racing driver) =

American racing driver

Jay Hill (born December 8, 1964) is an American former racing driver from Lake Geneva, Wisconsin.

Hill participated in one Toyota Atlantic race in 1991 at the Mid-Ohio Sports Car Course, finishing ninth. In 1992, he drove in the CART IndyCar World Series' Detroit Grand Prix in a year old Buick powered Lola fielded by Burns Racing. Starting last on the 25 car grid, he finished the race seven laps down in 15th.

== Racing record ==
=== SCCA National Championship Runoffs ===
Year	Track	Car	Engine	Class	Finish	Start	Status
1987	Road Atlanta	Lola T87/90	Ford	Sports 2000	4	6	Running
1988	Road Atlanta	Lola T87/90	Ford	Sports 2000	2	2	Running
1989	Road Atlanta	Lola T87/90	Ford	Sports 2000	1	1	Running

=== Indy Car World Series ===
(key)

Year	Team	1	2	3	4	5	6	7	8	9	10	11	12	13	14	15	16	Pos.	Pts	Ref
1992	Burns Racing Team	SRF	PHX	LBH	INDY	DET; 15	POR	MIL	NHA	TOR	MCH	CLE	ROA	VAN	MOH	NAZ	LAG	45th	0	
