= Éric Bachelart =

Belgian former race car driver

- Nationality: Belgian
- Born: 28 February 1961 (age 65); Brussels

Champ Car career
- 24 races run over 2 years
- Years active: 1992, 1995
- Team: Payton/Coyne Racing
- Best finish: 18th (1992)
- First race: 1992 Daikyo Indy Car Grand Prix (Surfers Paradise)
- Last race: 1995 Miller Genuine Draft 200 (Mid-Ohio
Wins	Podiums	Poles
0	0	0

Éric Bachelart (born 28 February 1961) is a Belgian former race car driver and Conquest Racing team owner.

== Racing career ==
Bachelart started his racing career in Belgium and ended in the United States. He was a star in Belgian Procar, a national touring car championship, driving for Audi and Peugeot.

In 1991, Bachelart became the inaugural Indy Lights champion. He then entered a near-full CART season with the tail-enders team of Dale Coyne, simultaneously racing in the Belgian Procar series. His highest CART finish was seventh. He failed to qualify for the 1993 Indianapolis 500. After the 1995 CART season, again only racing when his Belgian Procar schedule allowed it, he ended his single-seater career.

In 1996, Bachelart entered the 24 Hours of Le Mans endurance race for Belgium in a Ferrari 333SP. He also raced in the 24 Hours of Spa-Francorchamps with the Peugeot 806 multi-purpose vehicle. After this season, he concluded his racing career, with the exception of the 24 Hours of Spa-Francorchamps in 1998 and 2000.

== Team ownership ==
Bachelart founded the Conquest Racing team in 1997, initially running in the Indy Lights championship. The team entered Laurent Rédon in the 2002 Indy Racing League (IRL). The team switched to Champ Car, after Honda and Toyota switched to the IRL. Mario Haberfeld raced for the team in 2003. Future F1 driver Tiago Monteiro raced in a satellite team ran by Conquest Racing for Emerson Fittipaldi.

England's Justin Wilson joined for 2004, ran from mid-season by Nelson Philippe. For 2005, they ran Philippe and Andrew Ranger, one of the youngest teams in the championship's history. Ranger was partnered by Dutchman Charles Zwolsman for 2006. In 2007, Bachelart signed young New Zealander Matt Halliday to his Champ Car entry for four races. Halliday was then replaced by Jan Heylen. The team moved to the IRL as a result of open-wheel unification.

In 2012, Conquest left IndyCar and joined the American Le Mans Series with a Morgan-Nissan LMP2 prototype.

In 2017, Bachelart started entering cars in Ferrari Challenge winning multiple championship with gentleman drivers.

In 2018, Bachelart co-founded Quest Racing to compete at the IMSA Continental Tire SportsCar Challenge.

In 2019, Conquest also joins the Imsa Prototype Challenge ( IPC ) and in 2021 ran a Mercedes GT4 winning the last four races of the season.

== Racing record ==
=== Complete International Formula 3000 results ===
(key) (Races in bold indicate pole position) (Races in italics indicate fastest lap)

Year	Entrant	1	2	3	4	5	6	7	8	9	10	11	DC	Points
1988	Spirit/TOM's Racing	JER	VAL	PAU	SIL	MNZ	PER	BRH	BIR	BUG; DNQ	ZOL; DNQ	DIJ	NC	0

=== American Open Wheel ===
(key)

==== CART ====
Year	Team	1	2	3	4	5	6	7	8	9	10	11	12	13	14	15	16	17	Rank	Points	Ref
1992	Coyne	SRF; 22	PHX; 13	LBH; 8	INDY; 32	DET; 7	POR; 16	MIL; 13	NHM	TOR; 24	MIS; 22	CLE; 17	ROA; 21	VAN; DNS	MOH; 20	NZR; DNQ	LS; 23		**18th**	**11**	
1993	Coyne	SRF	PHX	LBH	INDY; DNQ	MIL	DET	POR	CLE	TOR	MIS	NHM	ROA	VAN	MOH	NZR	LS		**NC**	**0**	
1995	Payton/Coyne	MIA; 19	SRF; 22	PHX; 18	LBH; 7	NZR	INDY; 28	MIL	DET; 23	POR; 19	ROA; 11	TOR; 22	CLE; 21	MIS	MOH; 16	NHM	VAN	LS	**23rd**	**8**	

=== 24 Hours of Le Mans results ===
Year	Team	Co-Drivers	Car	Class	Laps	Pos.	Class Pos.
1993	(France) Écurie Toison d'Or	(Belgium) Marc Duez (Belgium) Philip Verellen	Venturi 500LM	GT	267	25th	9th
1996	Racing for Belgium Team Scandia	(Belgium) Marc Goossens (Belgium) Eric van der Poele	Ferrari 333 SP	WSC	208	DNF	DNF

Sporting positions
Preceded by Paul Tracy	Indy Lights Champion; 1991	Succeeded by Robbie Buhl
