= Thom Burns Racing =

- Owner(s): Thomas Burns; Bob Lazier
- Base: Indianapolis, Indiana, United States
- Series: IndyCar Series

Career
- Debut: 1989
- Latest race: 2018
- Races competed: 5
- Drivers' Championships: 0
- Indy 500 victories: 0
- Race victories: 0
- Pole positions: 0

Thom Burns Racing (also known as Milligan/Burns Racing Team, Burns Racing Team, Burns Motor Sports, Burns Motorsports and Lazier-Burns Racing) was an American auto racing team that competed in the IndyCar Series from 1989 to 2018.

The team was owned by Thomas Burns, an Indianapolis, Indiana-based property developer.

== History ==
=== 1989 ===
In 1989, the team intended to make their debut at the Indianapolis 500 with Tom Bigelow driving for Milligan/Burns Racing Team. He would drive the No. 66 Dianetics: The Modern Science of Mental Health March 86C-Cosworth DFX.

On the third day of qualifying, Bigelow blew an engine and the team parked the car on Bump Day, when it was determined that Bigelow would not be fast enough to qualify for the field.

=== 1990 ===
For 1990, the team was rebranded as Burns Racing Team and Guido Daccò drove the No. 66 Lola T88/00-Judd V8 at the Indianapolis 500. However, after struggling to reach qualifying speed in practice, Daccò failed to qualify.

Daccò ultimately tied for 29th place in the final standings with one point, although he also drove races for Euromotorsport, Bettenhausen Motorsports and Nu-Tech Motorsports.

=== 1991 ===
In 1991, Burns entered the Indianapolis 500 with two-time 500 winner Gordon Johncock driving the No. 66 Kroger Lola T89/00-Judd AV. However, Dominic Dobson would replace Johncock due to bringing additional sponsorship.

On the morning practice of the second day of qualifying, Dobson lost control of his car in turn four and hit the outer wall. In the crash, Dobson suffered a fractured left thigh bone at the knee, although he could race with a brace. Dobson would eventually qualify for the race in 30th place.

For the race, Coors and Rally's began to sponsor the car. In the race, Dobson made a pit stop on lap 43, while running in 16th place, when it was discovered that the right-rear half shaft was broken. He would ultimately finish 13th with 164 of 200 laps complete, in a race that had only 11 cars running at the finish.

With no points, Dobson tied for 32nd place in the final CART standings.

=== 1992 ===
For 1992, Burns expanded to two cars, each for just Indianapolis: Mark Dismore in the No. 66 Comet Kart Sales Lola T90/00-Buick Indy V6 and Dobson in the No. 68 Tobacco Free America Lola T91/00-Chevrolet Indy V8.

On Bump Day, the final day of qualifying, the two entries made attempts to qualify. Dismore would have his attempt be waived off, so he left for D. B. Mann Motorsports, while Dobson qualified at an average speed of 220.359 miles per hour in 29th place.

In the race, Dobson initially stayed about where he started, as he was in 26th after 10 laps, with two retirements having occurred by that point. By lap 100, with 14 of the 33 starters retired, Dobson was in 14th place, albeit four laps down. Ultimately, Dobson finished seven laps down in 12th place.

With one point, Dobson tied for 34th place in the final standings.

=== 1993 ===
In 1993, the team (now known as Burns Motor Sports) entered Indianapolis with Johnny Parsons in the No. 66 Mortgage Group of America Lola T92/00-Chevrolet Indy V8 A. However, Dobson ended up driving the entry, as a Galmer 92B with sponsorship from Coors Light.

On the third day of qualifying, Dobson had a four-lap average speed of 218.276 miles per hour, which would qualify him in 27th place.

In the race, by lap 40, Dobson was two laps down in 30th. He would lose two more laps by the halfway point. Ultimately, with 193 laps completed, Dobson finished in 23rd place.

Later in the year, Burns helped set-up PacWest Racing.

With no points, Dobson finished 34th in points.

=== 1996 ===
After a three-year hiatus, the newly renamed Burns Motorsports entered Indianapolis, with Jeff Wood driving the No. 66 Lola T92/00-Buick Indy V6. The team would not appear.

=== 2016 ===
In 2016, Burns became a part of Lazier Partners Racing and formed Lazier Burns Racing. There were considerations to field, for Indianapolis, Gabby Chaves, Jay Howard or Katherine Legge, Buddy Lazier remained as the driver. They would enter the No. 4 Dallara DW12-Chevrolet Indy V6.

On the first qualifying day, Lazier posted an average speed of 224.341 miles per hour and, on the second day, his average speed was 222.154 miles per hour, which qualified Lazier in 32nd place. After qualifying, Quiznos became the entry's primary sponsor.

During the parade laps for the race, Lazier made a pit stop, due to having a stuck throttle. Eventually, on lap 47, Lazier joined the race. On lap 150, Lazier lost his left front tire, as he was exiting pit lane. He would retire, due to the issue, and finish in 30th place, with 100 laps complete.

In the championship, Lazier finished 35th with one point.

=== 2018 ===
For 2018, Thom Burns Racing partnered with Dale Coyne Racing to field Conor Daly in the No. 17 United States Air Force Dallara UAK18-Honda V6.

On Bump Day, Daly initially posted an average speed of 222.684 miles per hour. This speed got him bumped by Ed Carpenter. Daly then re-qualified at an average speed of 224.736 miles per hours, which ended up being bumped by Oriol Servià. Afterwards, Daly made a third attempt, which had an average speed of 224.874 miles per hour, which would be good enough to qualify.

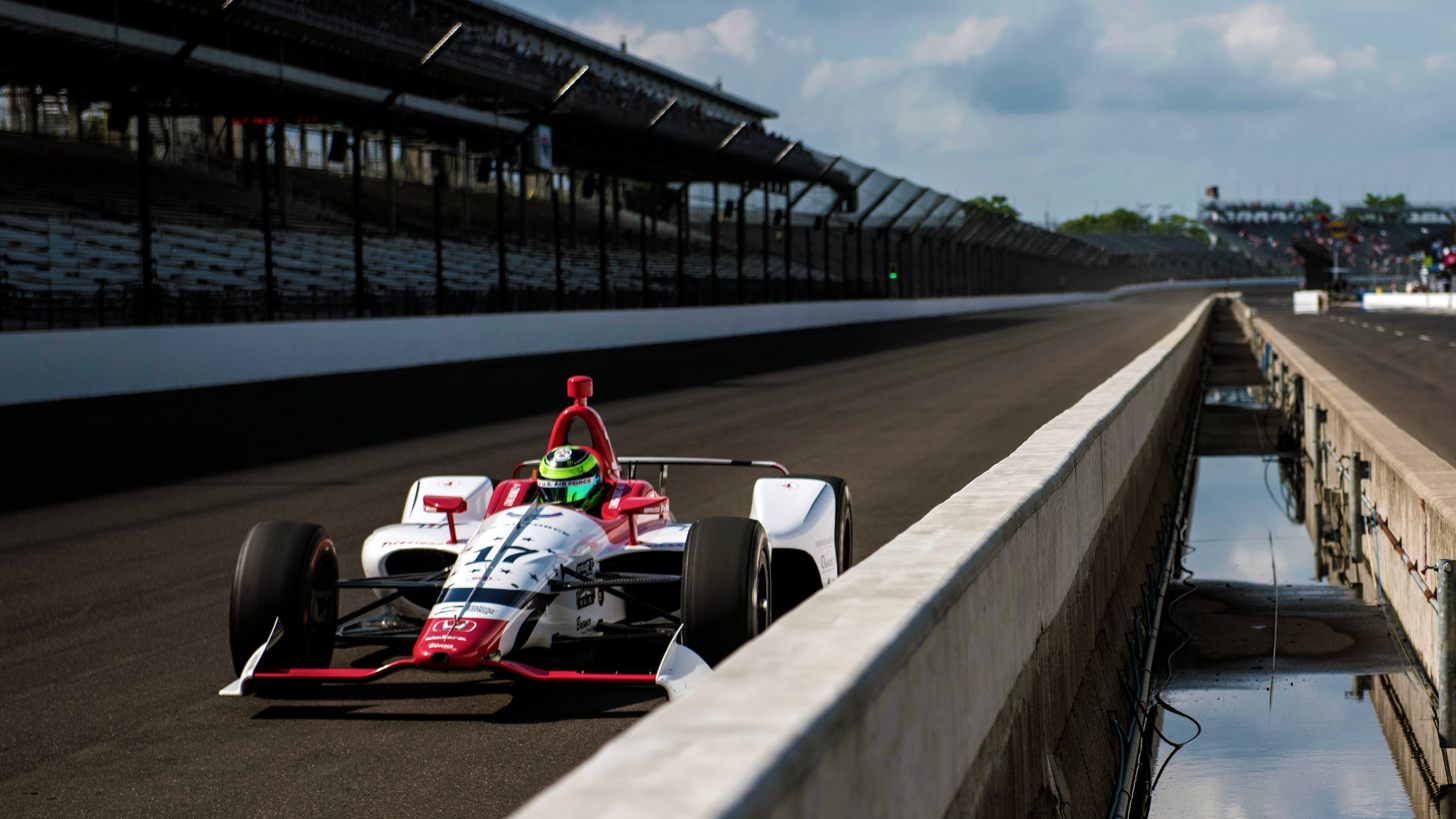
Daly during Bump Day qualifying at Indianapolis.

In the Pole Day qualifying session, Daly had an average speed of 224.429 miles per hour, which put him in the 33rd (last) starting position.

For the race, Daly would finish in 21st place, one laps down. He would finish 29th in the final standings, with 58 points (Daly also drove for Harding Racing).
