= 1992 Champ Car season =

The 1992 Champ Car season may refer to:

- the 1991–92 USAC Championship Car season, which was just one race, the 76th Indianapolis 500
- the 1992 PPG Indy Car World Series, sanctioned by CART, who later became Champ Car
