= 1992 PPG Indy Car World Series =

American motorsport season

1992 CART season
- PPG Indy Car World Series
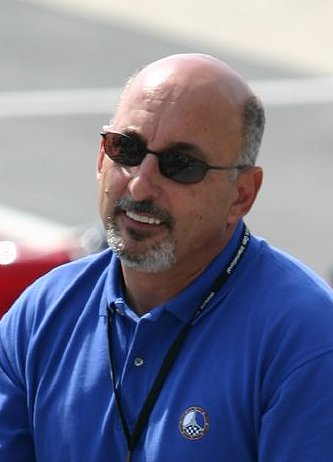
- Bobby Rahal

Season
- Races: 17
- Start date: March 22
- End date: October 18

Awards
- Drivers' champion: (United States) Bobby Rahal
- Constructors' Cup: (United Kingdom) Lola
- Manufacturers' Cup: (United States) Chevrolet
- Nations' Cup: United States
- Rookie of the Year: (Sweden) Stefan Johansson
- Indianapolis 500 winner: (United States) Al Unser Jr.

The 1992 PPG Indy Car World Series season was the 14th national championship season of American open wheel racing sanctioned by CART (d.b.a "IndyCar"). The season consisted of 16 races. Bobby Rahal was the national champion, his third and final career CART title. Stefan Johansson was named the Rookie of the Year. The 1992 Indianapolis 500 was sanctioned by USAC, but counted towards the CART points championship. Al Unser Jr. won the Indy 500 in the closest finish in the history of that event.

Starting in 1992, and continuing through 1996, the CART organization began operating under the name IndyCar. The term IndyCar was a registered trademark of IMS, Inc., and was licensed to CART from 1992 to 1996. The use of the term "CART" was curtailed in the series and in the media in favor of IndyCar during this period.

The circuit welcomed a new venue in 1992, New Hampshire International Speedway.

Bobby Rahal, who was in his first season as an owner/driver, won four races and three poles en route to the title. Rahal's three oval wins included a dominating wire-to-wire victory at Phoenix, where he led all 200 laps. Rahal fielded the "tried and true" Lola/Ilmor Chevrolet "A" combination. It was the final championship for the Ilmor Chevy A engine. Rahal managed to outperform the newer engines that joined the series in 1992, the Ford/Cosworth XB, as well as the Ilmor Chevy "B" engine, which was used by the Penske team. For the third time, Michael Andretti finished runner-up to Rahal in the points. Andretti promptly left Indy car racing the following year to race in Formula One.

A bevy of crashes, some serious, at the 1992 Indianapolis 500 injured several drivers, and shook up the driver lineup during parts of the season. Jovy Marcelo was fatally injured in a practice crash, while Nelson Piquet suffered devastating leg injures in another practice crash. Hiro Matsushita suffered a fractured leg and missed several races over the summer. Mario Andretti, Rick Mears, and Jimmy Vasser all sat out the race at Detroit while they recovered from injuries. In July, Mears dropped out of the Michigan 500 with nagging injuries, and ultimately sat out the rest of the season. Mears then unexpectedly retired from racing in December.

== Drivers and constructors ==
All entries utilized Goodyear tires. The following teams and drivers competed in the 1992 Indy Car World Series season.

Team	Chassis	Engine	No	Driver(s)	Status	Round(s)	Ref(s)
A. J. Foyt Enterprises	Lola T91/00; Lola T92/00 (Note: Used by the No. 14 car at rounds 4, 8, 10, 12–13 and 15–16)	Chevrolet V8/A	14	(Switzerland) Gregor Foitek	R	1, 3	
A. J. Foyt Enterprises	Lola T91/00; Lola T92/00	Chevrolet V8/A	14	(United States) A. J. Foyt		2, 4 (Note: Practiced for round 2, but withdrew from the event due to a shoulder injury.)	
A. J. Foyt Enterprises	Lola T91/00; Lola T92/00	Chevrolet V8/A	14	(United States) George Snider		2	
A. J. Foyt Enterprises	Lola T91/00; Lola T92/00	Chevrolet V8/A	14	(United States) Brian Bonner	R	5	
A. J. Foyt Enterprises	Lola T91/00; Lola T92/00	Chevrolet V8/A	14	(United States) Ross Cheever	R	6–7, 11–13	
A. J. Foyt Enterprises	Lola T91/00; Lola T92/00	Chevrolet V8/A	14	(United States) Pancho Carter		8, 10	
A. J. Foyt Enterprises	Lola T91/00; Lola T92/00	Chevrolet V8/A	14	(United States) Jon Beekhuis		9	
A. J. Foyt Enterprises	Lola T91/00; Lola T92/00	Chevrolet V8/A	14	(United States) Mike Groff		14–16	
A. J. Foyt Enterprises	Lola T91/00; Lola T92/00	Chevrolet V8/A	48	(United States) Jeff Andretti		4	
Bettenhausen Motorsports	Penske PC-20	Chevrolet V8/A	16	(United States) Tony Bettenhausen Jr.		1–4, 6–7, 10	
Bettenhausen Motorsports	Penske PC-20	Chevrolet V8/A	16	(Sweden) Stefan Johansson	R	5, 8–9, 11–16	
Burns Racing Team	Lola T91/00	Chevrolet V8/A	68	(United States) Dominic Dobson		4	
Chip Ganassi Racing	Lola T92/00	Ford-Cosworth XB	6	(Netherlands) Arie Luyendyk		4, 10	
Chip Ganassi Racing	Lola T92/00	Ford-Cosworth XB	6	(United States) Robby Gordon	R	5–7, 9, 11–13	
Chip Ganassi Racing	Lola T91/00	Chevrolet V8/A	6	(Belgium) Didier Theys		16 (Note: Entry run by P.I.G. Racing)	
Chip Ganassi Racing	Lola T91/00	Ford-Cosworth XB	9	(United States) Eddie Cheever		1	
Chip Ganassi Racing	Lola T92/00	Ford-Cosworth XB	9	(United States) Eddie Cheever		2–17	
Concept Motorsports	Lola T90/00	Buick	66	(United States) Mark Dismore	R	4 (Note: Deserted the ride on Bump Day to drive for D. B. Mann Motorsports.)	
Dale Coyne Racing	Lola T90/00; Lola T91/00 (Note: Used by Brian Bonner at round 4, and by the No. 19 car at rounds 13-16)	Cosworth; Buick (Note: Used at Round 4 (Indianapolis 500).)	19	(Belgium) Éric Bachelart	R	1–7, 9–14	
Dale Coyne Racing	Lola T90/00; Lola T91/00	Cosworth; Buick	19	(United States) Dennis Vitolo		8, 15–16	
Dale Coyne Racing	Lola T90/00; Lola T91/00	Cosworth; Buick	39	(United States) Dennis Vitolo		2	
Dale Coyne Racing	Lola T90/00; Lola T91/00	Cosworth; Buick	39	(Canada) Ross Bentley	R	1, 3, 5–6, 9–13	
Dale Coyne Racing	Lola T90/00; Lola T91/00	Cosworth; Buick	39	(United States) Brian Bonner	R	4, 7–8, 14	
Dale Coyne Racing	Lola T90/00; Lola T91/00	Cosworth; Buick	39	(Belgium) Éric Bachelart	R	16	
D.B. Mann Motorsports	Lola T90/00	Buick	93	(United States) John Paul Jr.		4	
D.B. Mann Motorsports	Lola T90/00	Buick	93T	(United States) Mark Dismore	R	4	
Dick Simon Racing	Lola T92/00	Chevrolet V8/A; Buick (Note: Used by Scott Brayton at round 4 (Indianapolis 500).)	11	(Japan) Hiro Matsushita		1–4, 9, 11–16 (Note: Practiced for round 4, but withdrew from the event due to a leg injury.)	
Dick Simon Racing	Lola T92/00	Chevrolet V8/A; Buick	11	(Brazil) Raul Boesel		4–8, 10	
Dick Simon Racing	Lola T92/00	Chevrolet V8/A; Buick	23	(Brazil) Raul Boesel		9, 11–16, NC	
Dick Simon Racing	Lola T92/00	Chevrolet V8/A; Buick	22	(United States) Scott Brayton		All	
Formula Project	Lola T91/00	Chevrolet V8/A; Buick	44	(France) Philippe Gache	R	4	
Paragon Racing	Lola T91/00	Chevrolet V8/A; Buick	90	(United States) Lyn St. James	R	4	
Euromotorsport Racing	Lola T91/00	Cosworth	42	(Italy) Nicola Marozzo	R	1	
Euromotorsport Racing	Lola T91/00	Cosworth	42	(Italy) Fabrizio Barbazza		4	
Euromotorsport Racing	Lola T90/00	Cosworth	42	(Italy) Vinicio Salmi	R	6, 9, 12–13, 16	
Euromotorsport Racing	Lola T90/00	Cosworth	42	(United States) Steve Chassey		7–8, 10	
Euromotorsport Racing	Lola T90/00	Cosworth	42	(United States) Mike Groff		11 (Note: Withdrew from the event after a practice crash.)	
Euromotorsport Racing	Lola T90/00	Cosworth	42	(Finland) Tero Palmroth		11	
Euromotorsport Racing	Lola T90/00	Cosworth	42	(United States) Jeff Wood		14	
Euromotorsport Racing	Lola T90/00	Cosworth	42	(Italy) Guido Daccò		15	
Euromotorsport Racing	Lola T91/00	Cosworth	50	(Philippines) Jovy Marcelo	R	1–4	
Euromotorsport Racing	Lola T91/00	Cosworth	50	(Germany) Christian Danner	R	5, 9, 11–16	
Euromotorsport Racing	Lola T91/00	Cosworth	50	(Italy) Nicola Marozzo	R	6	
Euromotorsport Racing	Lola T91/00	Cosworth	50	(United States) Mike Groff		7–8	
Euromotorsport Racing	Lola T91/00	Cosworth	50	(United States) George Snider		10	
Galles-Kraco Racing	Galmer G92; Galmer G92B (Note: Used by Al Unser Jr. at round 15.)	Chevrolet V8/A	3	(United States) Al Unser Jr.		All, NC	
Galles-Kraco Racing	Galmer G92; Galmer G92B	Chevrolet V8/A	18	(United States) Danny Sullivan		All, NC	
Hall-VDS Racing	Lola T92/00	Chevrolet V8/A	8	(United States) John Andretti		All, NC	
Hall-VDS Racing	Lola T91/00	Chevrolet V8/A	38	(Belgium) Didier Theys		4	
Hayhoe-Cole Racing	Lola T91/00	Chevrolet V8/A	47	(United States) Jimmy Vasser	R	1–4, 9, 14, 16	
Hemelgarn-Byrd Racing	Lola T91/00	Buick	81	(United States) Pancho Carter		4	
Hemelgarn-Byrd Racing	Lola T91/00	Buick	91	(United States) Stan Fox		4	
Hemelgarn Racing	Lola T91/00	Buick	92	(United States) Gordon Johncock		4	
King Motorsports	Lola T91/00	Buick	26	(Colombia) Roberto Guerrero		3	
King Motorsports	Lola T92/00	Buick	26	(United Kingdom) Jim Crawford		4	
King Motorsports	Lola T92/00	Buick	36	(Colombia) Roberto Guerrero		4	
Leader Cards Racing (Note: Team run by Hemelgarn Racing from round 9 onwards.)	Lola T91/00	Buick	21	(United States) Buddy Lazier		1–7, 9–10	
Leader Cards Racing	Lola T91/00	Chevrolet V8/A	21	(United States) Buddy Lazier		11–16	
McCormack Motorsports-Arciero Racing; McCormack Motorsports	Lola T90/00	Buick	30	(Italy) Fabrizio Barbazza		1–4 (Note: Practiced for round 4, but was replaced.)	
McCormack Motorsports-Arciero Racing; McCormack Motorsports	Lola T90/00	Buick	30	(United States) Johnny Parsons		4	
McCormack Motorsports-Arciero Racing; McCormack Motorsports	Lola T91/00	Buick	30	(United States) Jeff Wood		5–10	
McCormack Motorsports-Arciero Racing; McCormack Motorsports	Lola T91/00	Buick	30	(Canada) Jacques Villeneuve Sr.		11–12	
McCormack Motorsports-Arciero Racing; McCormack Motorsports	Lola T91/00	Buick	30	(Canada) John Jones		13–15	
McCormack Motorsports-Arciero Racing; McCormack Motorsports	Lola T91/00	Buick	30	(Finland) Tero Palmroth		16	
McCormack Motorsports-Arciero Racing; McCormack Motorsports	Lola T91/00	Buick	34	(United States) Jeff Wood		4	
Newman/Haas Racing	Lola T92/00; Lola T91/00 (Note: Used by Mario Andretti at round 1, and by Michael Andretti at rounds 1-2.)	Ford-Cosworth XB	1	(United States) Michael Andretti		All, NC	
Newman/Haas Racing	Lola T92/00; Lola T91/00	Ford-Cosworth XB	2	(United States) Mario Andretti		1–4, 6–16, NC	
Newman/Haas Racing	Lola T92/00; Lola T91/00	Ford-Cosworth XB	2	(Italy) Teo Fabi		5	
Nu-Tech Racing	Lola T91/00	Cosworth	28	(United States) Jay Hill	R	5	
Nu-Tech Racing	Lola T91/00	Cosworth	28	(Italy) Tony de Tommaso	R	16	
Penske Racing	Penske PC-21	Chevrolet V8/B	4	(United States) Rick Mears		1–4, 6–8, 10	
Penske Racing	Penske PC-21	Chevrolet V8/B	4	(Canada) Paul Tracy	R	5, 9, 11–13, 16, NC	
Penske Racing	Penske PC-21	Chevrolet V8/B	4	(United States) Al Unser		15	
Penske Racing	Penske PC-21	Chevrolet V8/B	5	(Brazil) Emerson Fittipaldi		All, NC	
Penske Racing	Penske PC-20	Chevrolet V8/B	7	(Canada) Paul Tracy	R	2, 4	
Penske Racing	Penske PC-21	Chevrolet V8/A	7	(Canada) Paul Tracy	R	10, 14–15	
P.I.G. Racing	Lola T91/00	Chevrolet V8/A	31	(United States) Ted Prappas		1, 3–9, 11–16	
Rahal-Hogan Racing	Lola T92/00	Chevrolet V8/A	12	(United States) Bobby Rahal		All, NC	
RAL Group; Robco Racing	Truesports 91C	Judd	24	(United States) Brian Till	R	3, 5–6, 8–9, 11–12, 14, 16	
Team Menard	Lola T92/00	Buick	27	(Brazil) Nelson Piquet	R	4 (Note: Practiced and withdrew from the event due to extensive leg injuries.)	
Team Menard	Lola T92/00	Buick	27	(United States) Al Unser		4	
Team Menard	Lola T92/00	Buick	51	(United States) Gary Bettenhausen		4	
Team Menard	Lola T91/00	Buick	59	(United States) Rocky Moran		4 (Note: Practiced and withdrew from the event because he didn't fit in the car.)	
Team Menard	Lola T91/00	Buick	59	(United States) Tom Sneva		4	
TEAMKAR International	Lola T91/00	Chevrolet V8/A	88	(Japan) Kenji Momota	R	4	
Truesports	Truesports 92C	Chevrolet V8/A	10	(United States) Scott Pruett		All	
Walker Motorsports	Lola T92/00; Lola T91/00 (Note: At the Indianapolis 500, Scott Goodyear qualified his spare car, a Lola T91/00, due to a mechanical issue in his primary car. On the second week of qualifications, Groff was signed to qualify the former primary car as the No. 15T entry, and was set to switch rides with Goodyear for the race. However, Groff had to relinquish his spot in the starting field after Goodyear was bumped.)	Chevrolet V8/A	15	(Canada) Scott Goodyear		All, NC	
Walker Motorsports	Lola T92/00; Lola T91/00	Chevrolet V8/A	15T	(United States) Mike Groff		4	
Walker Motorsports	Lola T92/00; Lola T91/00	Chevrolet V8/A	17	(United States) Mike Groff		5, 12	
Walker Motorsports	Lola T90/00	Cosworth	17	(United States) A. J. Foyt		1 (Note: Car loaned by Leader Cards Racing.)	
Walker Motorsports	Lola T91/00	Chevrolet V8/A	17	(United States) Johnny Rutherford		4	
Walker Motorsports	Lola T91/00	Chevrolet V8/A	17	(United States) Jimmy Vasser	R	6, 11, 13, 15 (Note: Entry run by Hayhoe-Cole Racing.)	
Walker Motorsports	Lola T91/00	Chevrolet V8/A	17	(United States) Jon Beekhuis		10	
Walker Motorsports	Lola T91/00	Chevrolet V8/A	17	(United States) Dennis Vitolo		14	
Walker Motorsports	Lola T91/00	Chevrolet V8/A	17	(United States) Willy T. Ribbs		16	

=== Driver changes ===
==== Preseason ====
- On September 5, 1991, Patrick Racing announced that Bobby Rahal would leave Galles-Kraco Racing to drive the No. 20 car in 1992, replacing Danny Sullivan. One day later, Galles-Kraco Racing announced the opposite move by signing Sullivan to drive the No. 18 car vacated by Rahal in a three-year deal.
- On October 23, 1991, the newly reformed Hayhoe-Cole Racing announced that Jimmy Vasser would drive "as many (races) as we can afford" for the team in 1992, aiming to complete the full season. Vasser had won six races on route to a second-place finish in the Atlantic Championship behind Jovy Marcelo, but was hampered by a lack of reliability.
- On November 21, 1991, A. J. Foyt expressed an intention to postpone his retirement and compete in the 1992 Indianapolis 500, which was confirmed on January 24, 1992.
- On January 4, 1992, the RAL Group announced that Brian Till would drive the No. 24 car in at least eight events, starting at the Grand Prix of Long Beach and competing in every subsequent road course event except for Vancouver. His limited schedule, later under the Robco Racing name, went on to include an additional race at the New Hampshire oval. Till finished fifth in Indy Lights points in 1991, a year after winning the Atlantic Championship driving for Robco.
- On January 8, 1992, Concept Motorsports announced that Dominic Dobson would drive their car for a part-time, 5-race schedule. It was due to begin at the Indianapolis 500, where the car would be entered as the No. 66 in conjunction with Burns Racing Team.
- On January 24, 1992, Hemelgarn-Byrd Racing announced that Stan Fox would return as the driver of the No. 91 car at the Indianapolis 500, with updated Buick engines on the same Lola T91/00 chassis.
- On February 4, 1992, King Motorsports announced an expansion of its Indianapolis 500 program to two cars, to be driven by Roberto Guerrero and Jim Crawford, having both raced for the team in 1991 and served as test drivers during the winter. It was also announced that Guerrero would drive at Long Beach as a warm-up for the 500, with no further races planned despite the increased manifold pressure for Buick engines at CART-sanctioned races.
- On February 13, 1992, Hemelgarn Racing announced that Gordon Johncock would return to drive the No. 92 car at the Indianapolis 500, this time around on the same Lola T91/00 machinery as the rest of the team.
- On February 14, 1992, Chip Ganassi Racing announced it would field a second car on a part-time basis for Arie Luyendyk and rookie Robby Gordon. Luyendyk would drive the No. 6 car at the Indianapolis 500, with the possibility of other oval races subject to additional funding. Gordon, a Ford-backed competitor with multiple wins in the IMSA GT series and off-road racing, was slated to drive at least six of the eight road course races after the Indianapolis 500.
- On February 17, 1992, Menard Racing announced that the former three-time Formula One world champion Nelson Piquet would drive the No. 27 car at the Indianapolis 500, making his Indy Car debut. Piquet had retired from Formula One in January, after finishing sixth in the last of his 14 seasons with the Benetton team. Piquet took the car that had been intended for Kevin Cogan, who was due to have reconstructive surgery on the shoulder injury he incurred in the 1991 edition. In the same announcement, Gary Bettenhausen was confirmed to return to the No. 51 for the third straight year.
- On February 22, 1992, Dale Coyne Racing announced that rookie Brian Bonner had signed a deal to compete in select races, including New Hampshire. He would eventually make his debut at the Indianapolis 500. Bonner had finished 8th in the IMSA GTP class standings in 1991, after brief appearances in the American Racing Series.
- On March 6, 1992, Dale Coyne Racing announced that Ross Bentley would drive the No. 39 car at six events, starting with the season opener at Surfers Paradise and including the Vancouver event he had raced in 1990 and 1991.
- On March 11, 1992, A. J. Foyt Enterprises announced that rookie Gregor Foitek would drive the No. 14 car at Surfers Paradise and Long Beach, being slated to contest the rest of the road course races and, potentially, the Indianapolis 500. It also confirmed that team owner A. J. Foyt would drive at Phoenix to prepare for the Indianapolis 500. Foitek, who had no family connection to Foyt despite the similar surnames, was a former Formula One driver with the Brabham and Onyx teams in 1990, and had contested a partial schedule in the World Sportscar Championship in 1991 with a privateer Porsche 962.
- On March 13, 1992, McCormack Motorsports-Arciero Racing announced the signing of Fabrizio Barbazza, who returned for his third stint with the team after the 1987 and 1989 seasons, to drive the No. 30 car. Barbazza switched from Formula 1, where he failed at all of his 12 attempts to qualify for a Grand Prix with the AGS team during his rookie season.
- As a part of his role as Penske Racing's test driver, Paul Tracy was scheduled to compete again in a third car for selected events, including the Indianapolis 500. It was reported that his schedule was limited to the oval events and potentially the two Canadian races, although Penske did not made any specific announcements beforehand. Tracy drove the older Penske PC-20 at Phoenix and Indianapolis.
- The following drivers were entered for the Surfers Paradise race and other events without a prior announcement:
  - Dale Coyne Racing signed reigning Indy Lights champion Éric Bachelart to drive the No. 19 car. Bachelart had been reported in February to have signed an eight-race deal for an unnamed team, but he ended up contesting an almost full season. Bachelart took the place of Randy Lewis, who retired from racing.
  - Leader Cards Racing would contest the full 1992 season with Buddy Lazier, who had raced for various outfits in 1991. His sponsorship package prevented the team from downsizing to an Indy 500-only program.
  - Euromotorsport Racing signed rookie Jovy Marcelo to contest the full season in the No. 50 car, and fielded the returning Nicola Marozzo in the No. 42 car on a one-race deal, both on year-old Lola T91/00. Marcelo, the first Filipino driver in Indy car racing, was the reigning Formula Atlantic champion, with the deal being signed after Marcelo contested the first round of the 1992 Atlantic Championship season in February.

==== Mid-season ====
- Newman/Haas Racing and Chip Ganassi Racing started the season with the older Lola T91/00 chassis due to the delayed delivery of newer Lola T92/00 chassis, custom-built for the Ford-Cosworth XB powerplant. At Phoenix, Michael Andretti remained in the T91/00, as Newman/Haas Racing assigned their only Lola T92/00 at the time to Mario Andretti.
- At the season opener in Surfers Paradise, Walker Motorsports fielded its second CART franchise, as the No. 17, in a joint effort with Leader Cards Racing, which provided their Lola T90/00-Cosworth spare car. The entry did not feature a driver until after qualifying, being included in the starting field regardless. On race day morning, March 22, 1992, A. J. Foyt was named as the driver in a start and park effort, to allow the entry to collect prize money.
- On March 31, 1992, a number of entries were posted for the Indianapolis 500:
  - D. B. Mann Motorsports entered John Paul Jr. to drive the No. 93 car for the third year in a row. The team entered the race one more time after they couldn't find a buyer in 1991, and announced it would shut down definitely after the race, although it would eventually return in 1993.
  - Truesports entered Geoff Brabham to drive the No. 21 car for the third year in a row. However, the effort was aborted on May 5 because of Scott Pruett destroying his primary car in a practice crash at Grand Prix of Long Beach, the lack of additional sponsorship to build a new model in time and Brabham suffering a minor neck injury in late April.
  - R. Kent Baker Racing entered Steve Chassey to drive the No. 97 car, which was supposed to be a Lola T91/00 chassis. However, neither the car or the driver took part in any practice session, and the Indy-only team disappeared.
- At Phoenix, Dale Coyne Racing entered Dennis Vitolo for an start and park effort in the No. 39 car. Vitolo drove again for Coyne at New Hampshire in the No. 19, instead of its regular driver Éric Bachelart.
- On April 1, 1992, Dick Simon Racing announced that Lyn St. James would drive the No. 90 car for the team at the Indianapolis 500 under the Paragon Racing banner, trying to become the second women in history to qualify for the race. She had previously driven in IMSA GT, with six wins in the GTO class, and Trans-Am. As a long-time Ford factory driver, St. James was scheduled to race a Cosworth engine, but she received permission to qualify and race a back-up car with a Chevrolet engine after encountering issues with her primary machine.
- On April 3, 1992, A. J. Foyt withdrew from the Phoenix event after injuring his shoulder blade in a practice crash. He was replaced the following day by veteran collaborator George Snider, who also worked as a refueller for the team and agreed to start and park the No. 14 car. This was Snider's first Indy Car start since 1987, and the first at Phoenix since 1978.
- On April 8, 1992, further new combinations were entered for the Indianapolis 500:
  - TEAMKAR International entered the Indianapolis 500 as a standalone team with rookie Kenji Momota in the No. 88 car, a Lola T91/00 with Chevrolet engines. Momota had previous experience in Indy Lights and Formula Atlantic competition, although he had not taken part in a race since 1990.
  - Dick Simon Racing entered Raul Boesel in the No. 29 car and rookie Philippe Gache in the No. 44 car. Boesel returned to Indy car racing and his first CART team after a year in IMSA GT, while Gache, the first Frenchman to attempt the Indianapolis 500 since 1940, was driving in the French Supertouring Championship after low-scoring seasons in International Formula 3000. Gache's entry, with a Lola T91/00, was an associate effort run by Formula Project, a French Formula 3 team.
- On April 21, 1992, Concept Motorsports announced that Mark Dismore would attempt to qualify at the Indianapolis 500 in the No. 66 instead of Dominic Dobson. Dismore was making his return to Indy Car competition after the extensive injuries he suffered the previous year at Indianapolis during practice. The agreement with Burns Racing Team was voided, but the car retained Burns' regular No. 66.
- On April 24, 1992, Gregor Foitek abandoned his A. J. Foyt Enterprises ride before the rookie orientation practice for the Indianapolis 500, after his wife imposed him an ultimatum to return their family to Europe. On April 28, 1992, Foyt announced that Jeff Andretti would attempt to qualify for the Indianapolis 500 in the No. 48 car. Andretti was expected to complete the rest of the season in the No. 14 car before the leg injuries he suffered in the race, though no announcement had been made beforehand.
- On April 24, 1992, Walker Motorsports announced that Johnny Rutherford would drive the No. 17 car at the Indianapolis 500, in his third attempt to make his 25th start at the race after not landing a ride in 1991. On May 4, 1992, it was announced that Rutherford would drive the rest of the season, but the sponsorship deal was voided just three days later, and the car was parked until Rutherford found additional sponsorship on May 15.
- On April 30, 1992, McCormack Motorsports-Arciero Racing announced that Jeff Wood would drive the No. 34 car, a Lola T91/00 chassis acquired to Hall-VDS Racing, for his second attempt at the Indianapolis 500.
- During the weeks of practice for the Indianapolis 500, the following driver assignments or changes occurred:
  - On May 6, 1992, Hall-VDS Racing announced that Didier Theys would drive their spare Lola T91/00 as the No. 38 car.
  - On May 7, 1992, Nelson Piquet suffered multiple leg and foot fractures in a practice crash. The next day, Menard Racing announced that four-time winner Al Unser would take over the No. 27 car, making his return to the Indianapolis 500 after not having a ride in 1991.
  - Early in May, it was reported that Raul Boesel had lost his financial backing and was working to find enough sponsorship to qualify the No. 29 car. On May 10, 1992, one day after Hiro Matsushita fractured his right femur in a practice crash, Boesel took his place in Dick Simon Racing's No. 11 car. On May 16, it was confirmed that Boesel would remain in the car during Matsushita's recovery. On May 23, Boesel signed a deal to run the rest of the season, which would see him step into the No. 23 machine once Matsushita returned.
  - On May 12, 1992, Burns Racing Team announced that Dominic Dobson would drive the No. 68 car, a Lola T91/00. It had been originally entered with a Buick engine, but Dobson's announcement was held off until the team was able to get second-hand Chevrolet engines.
  - On May 13, 1992, Hemelgarn-Byrd Racing announced that Pancho Carter would drive the No. 81 car, which had been tested regularly by Stan Fox.
  - On May 13, 1992, McCormack Motorsports-Arciero Racing announced that it had parted ways with Fabrizio Barbazza after crashing twice during the month. Two days later, veteran Johnny Parsons was announced as the new driver of the No. 30 car, while Barbazza stepped into the No. 42 car for Euromotorsport Racing.
  - On May 14, 1992, Menard Racing announced that Rocky Moran would drive the No. 59 car, two years after his last Indy 500 appearance. However, after just six practice laps, the deal was withdrawn due to Moran being too tall to fit in the tight confines of his Lola T91/00. On May 16, he was replaced by former Indy 500 winner Tom Sneva, who had failed to qualify with the same team one year before.
  - On May 15, 1992, Jovy Marcelo died in a practice crash due to blunt force trauma to the head, exactly 10 years to the date after the last driver fatality at the Speedway. The Euromotorsport Racing team, with Fabrizio Barbazza in the sister car, took no further part in the last two days of qualifying.
  - On May 15, 1992, Walker Motorsports announced that Mike Groff would attempt to qualify the No. 15T car, a Lola T92/00, which was the original primary machine for Scott Goodyear before he elected to qualify his spare Lola T91/00 car on Pole Day due to last-minute mechanical issues. The deal called for Groff to qualify the car and swap rides with Goodyear, taking over the T91/00 if both cars made the show. After Goodyear was bumped from the field, Groff relinquished his spot, and the No. 15T was again renumbered as No. 15.
  - On May 17, 1992, during Bump Day morning, Mark Dismore deserted his ride with Concept Motorsports after struggling during the month and switched to a back-up car for D. B. Mann Motorsports, labelled as No. 93T, on which he failed to qualify. Concept did not attempt to qualify after failing to reach a deal with Johnny Parsons.
- On May 27, 1992, Euromotorsport Racing announced that Christian Danner would make his Indy Car debut at the Detroit Grand Prix in the No. 50 car, vacant after the death of Jovy Marcelo. Danner, the first German-born driver in Indy car racing since Lothar Motschenbacher in the 1960s, competed in 36 Formula One races between 1985 and 1989, later racing in the Japanese Formula 3000 and the DTM with limited success.
- On June 1, 1992, Newman/Haas Racing announced that Mario Andretti would miss the Detroit Grand Prix after fracturing his toes, this being only the second time in his career he had been sidelined due to injury. He was replaced by Teo Fabi, the reigning World Sportscar champion with Jaguar, who had last raced an Indy car in 1990 with the defunct Porsche program.
- On June 1, 1992, Bettenhausen Motorsports announced that Swedish driver Stefan Johansson would drive the No. 16 car at the Detroit Grand Prix. Johansson, a former driver for the McLaren and Ferrari F1 teams with 79 career starts until 1991, replaced team owner Tony Bettenhausen Jr., who elected to reduce his schedule to the oval races after failing to qualify for the Indianapolis 500, for sporting and business reasons. Bettenhausen also announced that he would drive at Portland due to Johansson's previous commitment with Mazda at the 24 Hours of Le Mans. Johansson had previously reached an agreement to drive a second car for Truesports, which was never signed due to internal disagreements within the team.
- On June 1, 1992, A. J. Foyt Enterprises announced that Brian Bonner would race at the Detroit Grand Prix in the No. 14 car, which was set to be driven by Jeff Andretti before his injury.
- On June 3, 1992, Penske Racing announced that Rick Mears would miss the Detroit Grand Prix due to soreness in his injured wrist, being replaced in the No. 4 by reserve driver Paul Tracy.
- Other drivers were entered for the Detroit Grand Prix without a prior announcement:
  - Walker Motorsports entered the No. 17 car for Mike Groff, who didn't start the race after being a late qualifier. Groff would get to start a race in the No. 17 car later in the year at Road America, also as a late qualifier.
  - McCormack Motorsports-Arciero Racing entered Jeff Wood in the No. 30 car, which was vacant after the departure of Fabrizio Barbazza, and remained in the seat for the following five races.
  - Nu-Tech Motorsports entered the No. 28 car for rookie Jay Hill, a former champion of the SCCA Sports 2000 class who had also raced once in the Atlantic Championship.
- On June 16, 1992, Foyt announced that rookie Ross Cheever would drive at Portland instead of Brian Bonner, who claimed he had been promised a full-time ride. Cheever, twice a runner-up in the Japanese Formula 3000 standings with six wins, was hoped to race at most of the events that didn't collide with his Japanese campaign, competing in five races over the year. Bonner returned to Dale Coyne Racing, being entered at Milwaukee for practice purposes before competing at New Hampshire and Mid-Ohio.
- At Portland, Hayhoe-Cole Racing fielded the No. 17 car for Jimmy Vasser instead of their regular No. 47 as part of a partnership with Walker Motorsports, which was the entrant for the car and shared the related earnings for fielding its second franchised entry. This was done again at Cleveland, Vancouver and Nazareth, the last of which Vasser withdrew from, after fulfilling the franchise requirement by taking part in practice.
- At Portland, Euromotorsport Racing fielded an all-Italian lineup, with Nicola Marozzo in the No. 50 car and rookie Vinicio Salmi, a former race winner in the American Racing Series, in the No. 42 car, which was now a Lola T90/00 after their second T91/00 was destroyed on Jovy Marcelo's fatal crash. In the following oval races at Milwaukee and New Hampshire, Mike Groff drove the No. 50 car, while veteran Steve Chassey drove the No. 42 car, making his first Indy car starts since 1989. Chassey remained in the seat at the Michigan 500, where George Snider made a start and park effort in the No. 50 before resuming his refuelling duties for A. J. Foyt Enterprises.
- On June 31, 1992, Bettenhausen Motorsports announced that Stefan Johansson would make his oval debut at New Hampshire and complete the rest of the season in the No. 16 car, except for the Michigan 500, where Tony Bettenhausen Jr. would race instead.
- On July 2, 1992, A. J. Foyt Enterprises announced that veteran Pancho Carter would drive the No. 14 car at New Hampshire instead of Ross Cheever, who had a difficult oval debut at Milwaukee and would miss the following race at Toronto due to his racing commitments in Japan. Carter drove the No. 14 again at the Michigan 500. On July 13, 1992, Jon Beekhuis was announced as the driver of the No. 14 car for Toronto.
- On July 13, 1992, Penske Racing announced that Paul Tracy would replace Mears for the second time at the Toronto race, due to his lingering wrist issues, and that both drivers would compete at the Michigan 500 as part of a three-car effort. Penske also revealed that Tracy had been scheduled to drive the No. 7 car at his home race before Mears stepped down.
- On July 18, 1992, Hiro Matsushita announced he would not compete at the Michigan 500 after his aborted return at Toronto, where he withdrew after practice due to lingering leg pain. Boesel, who had driven the No. 23 car for the first time at Toronto, went back to the No. 11 at Michigan before Matsushita returned to the cockpit at Cleveland.
- At Toronto, Christian Danner resumed driving duties in Euromotorsport Racing's No. 50 car for all remaining road course races, later making his oval debut at Nazareth. In the same race, Vinicio Salmi returned to the No. 42 car, later racing at Road America, Vancouver and Laguna Seca.
- On July 30, 1992, Walker Motorsports announced it would enter the No. 17 car at the Michigan 500 for Jon Beekhuis, who was injured one year before with the same team at the same track.
- On August 4, 1992, Penske Racing announced that Paul Tracy would again replace Rick Mears at the Grand Prix of Cleveland, after Mears withdrew mid-race from the Michigan 500 because of his injured wrist. On August 12, 1992, it was announced that Mears would miss the rest of the season after having surgery on his wrist, with Tracy taking his spot.
- On August 6, 1992, the newly renamed McCormack Motorsports entered Jacques Villeneuve Sr. as the driver of the No. 30 car for the Cleveland Grand Prix, a deal that was extended to Road America. Villeneuve made his first Indy Car appearance since 1986, having remained active since in snowmobile racing among occasional cameos in Formula Atlantic and IMSA. On August 26, 1992, it was announced that John Jones would drive at Vancouver, later remaining in the car for the following two races. Veteran Tero Palmroth would finish the season at Laguna Seca.
- At Cleveland, Euromotorsport Racing entered Mike Groff in the No. 42 car, but he withdrew from the event after a practice crash. While Jeff Wood was initially entered to replace Groff, the car was eventually started by Tero Palmroth.
- At Mid-Ohio, Walker Motorsports fielded Dennis Vitolo in the No. 17 car, which was a team effort instead of a leased operation.
- Starting at Mid-Ohio, A. J. Foyt Enterprises hired Mike Groff to contest the final three races of the season, replacing Ross Cheever. Groff, who had already driven for the team at the end of 1991, became Foyt's ninth different driver over the year, including the team owner himself.
- At Mid-Ohio and Nazareth, Euromotorsport Racing entered the No. 42 car for Jeff Wood and Guido Daccò, both former drivers for the team.
- On September 17, 1992, Penske Racing announced that Al Unser would drive the No. 4 car at Nazareth, three years after his last race for Penske. Paul Tracy was set to drive the No. 7 car due to a previous sponsorship commitment with Mobil 1, as it had been the case at Mid-Ohio, where the No. 4 car with Marlboro colors was not run.
- At Nazareth and Laguna Seca, Dale Coyne Racing fielded Dennis Vitolo in the No. 19 car, which was its newly acquired Lola T91/00 chassis, because of Vitolo's new sponsorship, which can be traced as early as September 13, 1992. Bachelart was moved to the No. 39, although he did not took to the track at Nazareth.
- On October 17, 1992, Walker Motorsports announced that Willy T. Ribbs would drive the No. 17 car that weekend at the Laguna Seca season finale. Ribbs had driven for Walker for most of the 1991 season.
- At Laguna Seca, Chip Ganassi Racing entered Didier Theys in the No. 6 car on behalf of P.I.G. Racing, who ran the effort as their second car.
- At Laguna Seca, Nu-Tech Motorsports entered Tony de Tommaso in the No. 28 car for his first Indy car start, after failing to qualify at Denver in 1991.

=== Team changes ===
==== Preseason ====
- On January 24, 1991, Galles-Kraco Racing announced its plans to build its own car, to be named as Galmer G92, for the 1992 season. The car was first unveiled to the public on August 24, 1991.
- On August 2, 1991, Chevrolet announced that it would expand its engine program in 1992 to supply Dick Simon Racing's second car, with driver Hiro Matsushita switching from a Cosworth, and Bob Tezak's UNO Racing, who was using Judd engines. Vince Granatelli Racing also received their own Chevrolet contract, as the one they had was initially awarded to Doug Shierson Racing before its merger with Granatelli and Tezak's eventual departure in June 1991. The programme would be further expanded on September 13, 1991, with Truesports, and on January 8, 1992, with P.I.G. Racing, as both teams ditched the Judd engines.
- On October 20, 1991, Alfa Romeo announced its withdrawal from Indy Car racing after three seasons, ending its two-year relationship with Patrick Racing. On the same day, Patrick reported to the press that Chevrolet had denied the team an engine contract earlier in the month, because of a trangression in late 1989 when they had sent a unit to Alfa Romeo engineers, who tore it apart and studied it. An offer to run a limited, unsupported batch of Alfa engines was rejected, and a tentative agreement with Newman/Haas Racing to use their 1991 Chevrolet engines was discarded in November because of a lack of guarantees for rebuilds and electronics supply from Chevrolet builders Ilmor.
- On October 23, 1991, Jim Hayhoe announced the reformation of the Hayhoe Racing team, which had fielded Indy Cars in 1967–68 and 1970. The team reached a deal with Galles-Kraco Racing, who sold two Lola T91/00 chassis, facilitated the use of Chevrolet engines and recommended their test driver Jimmy Vasser. In February, it was reported that race car collector Rick Cole was a co-owner in the team, which was known as Hayhoe-Cole Racing.
- On October 30, 1991, Ford Motor Company announced its return to Indy Car racing in an official capacity for the first time since 1971, teaming up with Cosworth. The new Ford-Cosworth XB engines would be supplied to Newman/Haas Racing and Chip Ganassi Racing, with both teams switching from Chevrolet. The same day, Chevrolet announced a new version of their engine, to be used exclusively by Penske Racing in 1992.
- On December 17, 1991, former Indy Lights team Concept Motorsports announced it would enter Indy Car racing, with a five race programme starting at the Indianapolis 500. The team was owned by Cliff Haverson, a former chief mechanic for All American Racers and Patrick Racing, and was set to use a Buick engine with a Lola T90/00 development chassis.
- On December 19, 1991, Bobby Rahal announced he had bought out Patrick Racing along with his business partner Carl Hogan, a former team owner in Can-Am and Formula 5000. The organization was renamed as Rahal-Hogan Racing, signed an engine supply deal with Chevrolet and changed numbers on the car to No. 12. Former team owner Pat Patrick claimed he felt forced to sell after being 'black-listed' by Chevrolet, so the team could receive a competitive engine, and thus retain sponsorship from the Miller Brewing Company.
- On January 4, 1992, the provisionally named RAL Group, a team with former Indy Lights and Atlantic Championship experience under the Cole Performance banner, announced it would step up to the Indy Cars in 1992. The team became the first and only customer for the Truesports chassis, using the 91C model with Judd engines. The name of the team was later stablished as Robco Racing in late May.
- On January 22, 1992, Vince Granatelli Racing announced the team would be shut down after five seasons in the series due to a lack of sponsorship. Despite winning two races with Arie Luyendyk, Granatelli run half of the 1991 season without corporate support after its split with co-owner Bob Tezak.
- On February 13, 1992, it was reported that Bayside Motorsports had shut down after three seasons in Indy Car racing, leaving Jeff Andretti without a drive. The team had lost the Texaco sponsorship, and its owner Bruce Leven had sold all of his auto franchises after a costly divorce settlement.
- On February 20, 1992, Walker Motorsports announced the assimilation of UNO Racing, after Derrick Walker bought a 51% controlling stake from Bob Tezak. The team inherited the last of Scott Goodyear's three-year deal, his sponsorship and the Chevrolet engine, paired with a new Lola T92/00.
- After the Buick engines received an additional 5 inches of manifold pressure, Leader Cards Racing switched engines as a result, having raced with Cosworth powerplants since 1980. Dale Coyne Racing, which was a Cosworth customer, elected to make an Indy 500-only switch to the Buick engine, first with Eric Bachelart and then during May with Brian Bonner by acquiring a back-up car from King Motorsports.
- After partnering with Dale Coyne Racing in 1991, Nu-Tech Motorsports returned as an independent operation, entering two events.

==== Mid-season ====
- Walther Motorsports did not enter the Indianapolis 500 after failing to qualify in the last two editions, putting a definite end to the team after decades in Indy car racing. Driver Salt Walther was arrested in March 1992 over the theft of a golf cart owned by the Indianapolis Motor Speedway after the 1991 race.
- For the 1992 season, Arciero Racing changed names to McCormack Motorsports-Arciero Racing, reflecting the ownership change that had already taken place the previous season between team manager Dennis McCormack and franchise owner Frank Arciero. In August 1992, the team came to be known only as McCormack Motorsports, as both entities were set to split for 1993.
- For the Indianapolis 500, Dick Simon Racing entered cars for Scott Brayton that featured both its regular Chevrolet engines and stock-block Buick engines, built by Brayton Engineering. After practising with both cars, Brayton elected to qualify with a Buick.
- After failing to qualify for the Indianapolis 500, and the departure of its former driver Dominic Dobson, Concept Motorsport failed to appear at any other race during the season due to a lack of sponsorship, and was closed shortly after.
- After missing the New Hampshire race, Leader Cards Racing struck a deal with Hemelgarn Racing to lease its racing operation for the remainder of the season. The car was run in Hemelgarn colors, and it switched to a Chevrolet engine from Cleveland onwards. Although it was reported during the year that Leader Cards had closed up shop, the team retained its franchise and retook control after the season.

== Schedule ==
Icon	Legend
O	Oval/Speedway
R	Road course
S	Street circuit
NC	Non-championship race

Rd.	Date	Race Name	Track	Location
1	March 22	Daikyo IndyCar Grand Prix	S Surfers Paradise Street Circuit	Surfers Paradise, Australia
2	April 5	Valvoline 200	O Phoenix International Raceway	Phoenix, Arizona
3	April 12	Toyota Grand Prix of Long Beach	S Streets of Long Beach	Long Beach, California
4	May 24	Indianapolis 500	O Indianapolis Motor Speedway	Speedway, Indiana
5	June 7	ITT Automotive Detroit Grand Prix	S The Raceway on Belle Isle Park	Detroit, Michigan
6	June 21	Budweiser/G. I. Joe's 200	R Portland International Raceway	Portland, Oregon
7	June 28	Miller Genuine Draft 200	O Milwaukee Mile	West Allis, Wisconsin
8	July 5	New England 200	O New Hampshire International Speedway	Loudon, New Hampshire
9	July 19	Molson Indy Toronto	S Exhibition Place	Toronto, Ontario
10	August 2	Marlboro 500	O Michigan International Speedway	Brooklyn, Michigan
11	August 9	Budweiser Grand Prix of Cleveland	S Cleveland Burke Lakefront Airport	Cleveland, Ohio
12	August 23	Texaco/Havoline 200	R Road America	Elkhart Lake, Wisconsin
13	August 30	Molson Indy Vancouver	S Streets of Vancouver	Vancouver, British Columbia
14	September 13	Pioneer Electronics 200	R Mid-Ohio Sports Car Course	Lexington, Ohio
NC	October 3	Marlboro Challenge	O Pennsylvania International Raceway	Nazareth, Pennsylvania
15	October 4	Bosch Spark Plug Grand Prix	O Pennsylvania International Raceway	Nazareth, Pennsylvania
16	October 18	Toyota Monterey Grand Prix	R Laguna Seca Raceway	Monterey, California

* Indianapolis was USAC-sanctioned but counted towards the PPG Indy Car title.

== Results ==
Rd.	Race	Pole position	Most laps led	Race winner			
Rd.	Race	Pole position	Most laps led	Driver	Team	Chassis	Engine
1	Surfers Paradise	(United States) Al Unser Jr.	(United States) Michael Andretti	(Brazil) Emerson Fittipaldi	Marlboro Team Penske	Penske PC-21	Chevrolet V8/B
2	Phoenix	(United States) Michael Andretti	(United States) Bobby Rahal	(United States) Bobby Rahal	Rahal-Hogan Racing	Lola T92/00	Chevrolet V8/A
3	Long Beach	(United States) Michael Andretti	(United States) Al Unser Jr.	(United States) Danny Sullivan	Galles-Kraco Racing	Galmer G92	Chevrolet V8/A
4	Indianapolis	(Colombia) Roberto Guerrero	(United States) Michael Andretti	(United States) Al Unser Jr.	Galles-Kraco Racing	Galmer G92	Chevrolet V8/A
5	Belle Isle	(United States) Michael Andretti	(United States) Michael Andretti	(United States) Bobby Rahal	Rahal-Hogan Racing	Lola T92/00	Chevrolet V8/A
6	Portland	(Brazil) Emerson Fittipaldi	(United States) Michael Andretti	(United States) Michael Andretti	Newman/Haas Racing	Lola T92/00	Ford-Cosworth XB
7	Milwaukee	(United States) Bobby Rahal	(United States) Michael Andretti	(United States) Michael Andretti	Newman/Haas Racing	Lola T92/00	Ford-Cosworth XB
8	New Hampshire	(United States) Bobby Rahal	(United States) Bobby Rahal	(United States) Bobby Rahal	Rahal-Hogan Racing	Lola T92/00	Chevrolet V8/A
9	Toronto	(United States) Bobby Rahal	(United States) Michael Andretti	(United States) Michael Andretti	Newman/Haas Racing	Lola T92/00	Ford-Cosworth XB
10	Michigan	(United States) Mario Andretti	(Canada) Scott Goodyear	(Canada) Scott Goodyear	Walker Motorsport	Lola T92/00	Chevrolet V8/A
11	Cleveland	(Brazil) Emerson Fittipaldi	(Brazil) Emerson Fittipaldi	(Brazil) Emerson Fittipaldi	Marlboro Team Penske	Penske PC-21	Chevrolet V8/B
12	Road America	(Canada) Paul Tracy	(Brazil) Emerson Fittipaldi	(Brazil) Emerson Fittipaldi	Marlboro Team Penske	Penske PC-21	Chevrolet V8/B
13	Vancouver	(United States) Michael Andretti	(United States) Michael Andretti	(United States) Michael Andretti	Newman/Haas Racing	Lola T92/00	Ford-Cosworth XB
14	Mid-Ohio	(United States) Michael Andretti	(United States) Michael Andretti	(Brazil) Emerson Fittipaldi	Marlboro Team Penske	Penske PC-21	Chevrolet V8/B
NC	Marlboro Challenge	(United States) Michael Andretti	(United States) Bobby Rahal	(Brazil) Emerson Fittipaldi	Marlboro Team Penske	Penske PC-21	Chevrolet V8/B
15	Nazareth	(United States) Michael Andretti	(United States) Michael Andretti	(United States) Bobby Rahal	Rahal-Hogan Racing	Lola T92/00	Chevrolet V8/A
16	Laguna Seca	(United States) Michael Andretti	(United States) Michael Andretti	(United States) Michael Andretti	Newman/Haas Racing	Lola T92/00	Ford-Cosworth XB

== Point standings ==
=== Driver standings ===
Pos	Driver	SUR (Australia)	PHX (United States)	LBH (United States)	INDY (United States)	BEL (United States)	POR (United States)	MIL (United States)	NHS (United States)	TOR (Canada)	MIS (United States)	CLE (United States)	ROA (United States)	VAN (Canada)	MOH (United States)	MAR (United States)	NAZ (United States)	LAG (United States)	Pts
1	(United States) Bobby Rahal	3	1*	2	6	1	14	**2**	**1***	**2**	11	4	3	22	24	6*	1	3	196
2	(United States) Michael Andretti	17*	**10**	**16**	13*	**4***	1*	1*	2	1*	18	2	4	**1***	**21***	**2**	**2***	**1***	192
3	(United States) Al Unser Jr.	**4**	5	4*	1	9	3	7	8	7	4	3	2	2	3	8	11	9	169
4	(Brazil) Emerson Fittipaldi	1	3	3	24	8	**2**	4	21	19	13	**1***	1*	19	1	1	7	19	151
5	(Canada) Scott Goodyear	9	18	5	2	22	8	8	3	6	1*	10	20	5	16	4	4	26	108
6	(United States) Mario Andretti	7	17	23	23		6	6	7	4	**15**	5	5	6	5	9	5	2	105
7	(United States) Danny Sullivan	5	12	1	5	5	12	12	9	3	8	20	7	7	8	10	17	7	99
8	(United States) John Andretti	6	6	20	8	21	5	9	5	5	6	12	6	15	4	7	18	5	94
9	(Brazil) Raul Boesel				7	2	9	10	18	22	3	6	8	11	7	5	6	6	80
10	(United States) Eddie Cheever	8	2	22	4	11	4	5	16	9	20	11	23	16	12		9	4	80
11	(United States) Scott Pruett	18	7	9	30	19	10	11	6	25	5	7	9	4	9		10	14	62
12	(Canada) Paul Tracy		4		20	16				21	2	19	**17**	23	2	3	3	16	59
13	(United States) Rick Mears	2	8	6	26		7	16	4		16								47
14	(Sweden) Stefan Johansson RY					3			10	11		9	19	3	6		21	11	47
15	(United States) Scott Brayton	20	9	17	22	12	22	3	17	17	10	21	12	8	10		8	10	39
16	(United States) Al Unser				3												12		15
17	(United States) Ted Prappas	10		14	16	14	15	15	20	23		13	10	9	11		19	18	12
18	(Belgium) Éric Bachelart R	22	13	8	32	7	16	13		24	22	17	21	DNS	20			23	11
19	(United States) Buddy Lazier	16	14	12	14	24	25	17		15	7	23	13	10	22		15	21	10
20	(United States) Robby Gordon R					17	13	21		8		8	18	17					10
21	(Italy) Teo Fabi					6													8
22	(United States) Jimmy Vasser R	15	15	7	21		23			12		14		18	25		Wth	12	8
23	(United States) Brian Till R			11		23	20		12	10		15	11		14			27	8
24	(United States) Tony Bettenhausen Jr.	13	11	15	DNQ		21	18			9								6
25	(United States) Mike Groff				Wth	DNS		14	13			Wth	24		15		16	8	5
26	(United States) A. J. Foyt	23	Wth		9														4
27	(Japan) Hiro Matsushita	Wth	16	10	Wth					Wth		24	14	13	18		14	15	3
28	(United States) Brian Bonner R				19	10		Wth	Wth						17				3
29	(United States) John Paul Jr.				10														3
30	(Canada) Ross Bentley R	11		Wth		20	17			14	23	18	Wth	14					2
31	(United States) Pancho Carter				DNQ				11		17								2
32	(United States) Ross Cheever R						11	20				25	25	Wth					2
33	(United States) Lyn St. James R				11														2
34	(United States) Jeff Wood				DNQ	13	19	19	15	13	12				13				1
35	(Italy) Fabrizio Barbazza	12	20	21	DNQ														1
36	(Canada) John Jones													12	23		22		1
37	(United States) Dominic Dobson				12														1
38	(Colombia) Roberto Guerrero			13	**33**														1
39	(Germany) Christian Danner R					18				16		16	16	21	19		13	20	0
40	(Belgium) Didier Theys				DNQ													13	0
41	(Netherlands) Arie Luyendyk				15						14								0
42	(United States) Dennis Vitolo		21						14						DNS		20	17	0
43	(Philippines) Jovy Marcelo R	14	19	19	Wth^{1}														0
44	(Italy) Vinicio Salmi R						18			20			15	20				24	0
45	(United States) Jay Hill R					15													0
46	(United States) Gary Bettenhausen				17														0
47	(Switzerland) Gregor Foitek R	21		18															0
48	(United States) Jon Beekhuis									18	21								0
49	(United States) Jeff Andretti				18														0
50	(United States) Steve Chassey							22	19		19								0
51	(Italy) Nicola Marozzo R	19					24												0
52	(Canada) Jacques Villeneuve Sr.											22	22						0
53	(United States) George Snider		22								24								0
54	(Italy) Tony de Tommaso R																	22	0
55	(Italy) Guido Daccò																23		0
56	(United Kingdom) Jim Crawford				25														0
57	(United States) Willy T. Ribbs																	25	0
58	(Finland) Tero Palmroth											26						28	0
59	(United States) Stan Fox				27														0
60	(France) Philippe Gache R				28														0
61	(United States) Gordon Johncock				29														0
62	(United States) Tom Sneva				31														0
	(United States) Mark Dismore R				DNQ														0
	(Japan) Kenji Momota R				DNQ														0
	(United States) Johnny Parsons				DNQ														0
	(United States) Johnny Rutherford				DNQ														0
	(United States) Rocky Moran				Wth														0
	(Brazil) Nelson Piquet R				Wth														0
Pos	Driver	SUR (Australia)	PHX (United States)	LBH (United States)	INDY (United States)	BEL (United States)	POR (United States)	MIL (United States)	NHA (United States)	TOR (Canada)	MIS (United States)	CLE (United States)	ROA (United States)	VAN (Canada)	MOH (United States)	MAR (United States)	NAZ (United States)	LAG (United States)	Pts

Color	Result
Gold	Winner
Silver	2nd place
Bronze	3rd place
Green	4th-6th place
Light Blue	7th-12th place
Dark Blue	Finished (Outside Top 12)
Purple	Did not finish
Red	Did not qualify (DNQ)
Brown	Withdrawn (Wth)
Black	Disqualified (DSQ)
White	Did not start (DNS)
Blank	Did not participate (DNP)
Blank	Not competing

**In-line notation**
**Bold**	Pole position
Italics	Ran fastest race lap
*	Led most race laps
RY	Rookie of the Year
R	Rookie

Note: ^{1} Jovy Marcelo was killed in practice for the 1992 Indianapolis 500. He was 27 years old.

=== Results by entrant ===
- Only full-time entrants and points scoring cars shown.

Pos	Driver	SUR (Australia)	PHX (United States)	LBH (United States)	INDY (United States)	BEL (United States)	POR (United States)	MIL (United States)	NHS (United States)	TOR (Canada)	MIS (United States)	CLE (United States)	ROA (United States)	VAN (Canada)	MOH (United States)	NAZ (United States)	LAG (United States)	Pts
1	#12 Rahal-Hogan Racing	3	1*	2	6	1	14	**2**	**1***	**2**	11	4	3	22	24	1	3	196
2	#1 Newman/Haas Racing	17*	**10**	**16**	13*	**4***	1*	1*	2	1*	18	2	4	**1***	**21***	**2***	**1***	192
3	#3 Galles-Kraco Racing	**4**	5	4*	1	9	3	7	8	7	4	3	2	2	3	11	9	169
4	#5 Penske Racing	1	3	3	24	8	**2**	4	21	19	13	**1***	1*	19	1	7	19	151
5	#2 Newman/Haas Racing	7	17	23	23	6	6	6	7	4	**15**	5	5	6	5	5	2	113
6	#15 Walker Motorsports	9	18	5	2	22	8	8	3	6	1*	10	20	5	16	4	26	108
7	#18 Galles-Kraco Racing	5	12	1	5	5	12	12	9	3	8	20	7	7	8	17	7	99
8	#8 Hall-VDS Racing	6	6	20	8	21	5	9	5	5	6	12	6	15	4	18	5	94
9	#9 Chip Ganassi Racing	8	2	22	4	11	4	5	16	9	20	11	23	16	12	9	4	80
10	#10 Truesports	18	7	9	30	19	10	11	6	25	5	7	9	4	9	10	14	62
11	#7 Penske Racing		4		20						2				2	3		58
12	#16 Bettenhausen Motorsports	13	11	15	DNQ	3	21	18	10	11	9	9	19	3	6	21	11	53
13	#4 Penske Racing	2	8	6	26	16	7	16	4	21	16	19	**17**	23		12	16	49
14	#11 Dick Simon Racing	Wth	16	10	7	2	9	10	18	Wth	3	24	14	13	18	14	15	46
15	#22 Dick Simon Racing	20	9	17	22	12	22	3	17	17	10	21	12	8	10	8	10	39
16	#23 Dick Simon Racing									22		6	8	11	7	6	6	37
17	#14 A. J. Foyt Enterprises	21	22	18	9	10	11	20	11	18	17	25	25	Wth	15	16	8	16
18	#27 Team Menard				3													14
19	#31 P.I.G. Racing	10		14	16	14	15	15	20	23		13	10	9	11	19	18	12
20	#19 Dale Coyne Racing	22	13	8	32	7	16	13	14	24	22	17	21	DNS	20	20	17	11
21	#21 Leader Card Racing	16	14	12	14	24	25	17		15	7	23	13	10	22	15	21	10
22	#6 Chip Ganassi Racing				15	17	13	21		8	14	8	18	17			13	10
23	#47 Hayhoe-Cole Racing	15	15	7	21					12					25		12	8
24	#24 Robco Racing			11		23	20		12	10		15	11		14		27	8
25	#93 D. B. Mann Motorsports				10													3
26	#30 McCormack Motorsports	12	20	21	DNQ	13	19	19	15	13	12	22	22	12	23	22	28	3
27	#39 Dale Coyne Racing	11	21	Wth	19	20	17	Wth	Wth	14	23	18	Wth	14	17		23	2
28	#90 Paragon Racing				11													2
29	#68 Burns Racing Team				12													1
30	#36 King Motorsports				**33**													1
31	#50 Euromotorsport Racing	14	19	19	Wth	18	24	14	13	16	24	16	16	21	19	13	20	0
32	#42 Euromotorsport Racing	19			Wth		18	22	19	20	19	26	15	20	13	23	24	0
33	#17 Walker Motorsports	23			DNQ	DNS	23				21	14	24	18	DNS	Wth	25	0
Pos	Driver	SUR (Australia)	PHX (United States)	LBH (United States)	INDY (United States)	BEL (United States)	POR (United States)	MIL (United States)	NHS (United States)	TOR (Canada)	MIS (United States)	CLE (United States)	ROA (United States)	VAN (Canada)	MOH (United States)	NAZ (United States)	LAG (United States)	Pts

=== Chassis Constructors' Cup ===
Pos	Chassis	Pts
1	(United Kingdom) Lola T9200/T9100/T9000	311
2	(United States) Penske PC-21/PC-20	218
3	(United States) Galmer G92	170
4	(United States) Truesports 92C/91C	68
Pos	Chassis	Pts

=== Engine Manufacturers' Cup ===
Pos	Engine	Pts
1	(United States) Chevrolet A/B	472
2	(United States) Ford-Cosworth XB	232
3	(United States) Buick	24
4	(United Kingdom) Judd	8
5	(United Kingdom) Cosworth DFS	2
Pos	Engine	Pts

== See also ==
- 1992 Indianapolis 500
- 1992 Toyota Atlantic Championship season
- 1992 Indy Lights season
- 1992 Formula One season
