= Penske PC-21 =

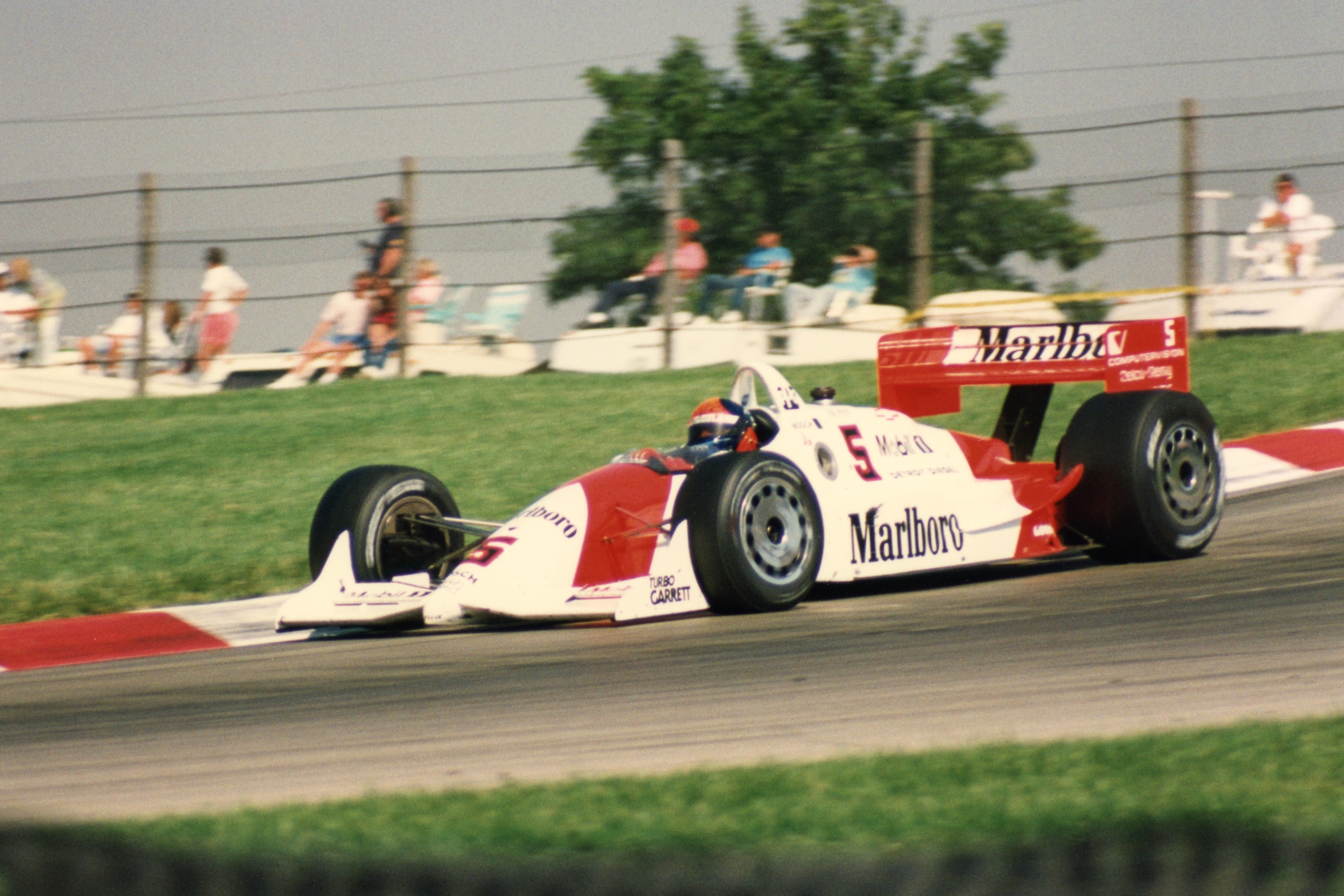
- Category: CART IndyCar
- Constructor: Penske Cars Ltd.
- Designer: Nigel Bennett
- Predecessor: Penske PC-20
- Successor: Penske PC-22

Technical specifications
- Suspension (front): pushrod
- Suspension (rear): pushrod
- Engine: Ilmor-Chevrolet 265A 2,647 cc (161.5 cu in) V8 90° turbocharged Mid-engined, longitudinally mounted
- Transmission: manual
- Weight: 1,550 lb (703.1 kg)
- Fuel: Methanol, supplied by Mobil
- Tires: Goodyear Eagle

Competition history
- Notable entrants: Penske Racing
- Notable drivers: 3 Rick Mears; 5 Emerson Fittipaldi; 17 Paul Tracy
- Debut: 1992 Daikyo IndyCar Grand Prix
Wins	Poles
5	3

The Penske PC-21 was a CART Penske Racing car which competed in the 1992 IndyCar season, alongside the older PC-20 chassis. In 1992, it scored 5 race wins, all with Emerson Fittipaldi, including the season-opening round in Australia, and the special Marlboro Challenge at Nazareth, eventually placing 4th at the season's end respectively. The car was designed by Nigel Bennett, his 3rd for Penske Racing. It was powered by the Ilmor-Chevrolet 265-A turbo engine.

Ayrton Senna famously did a test with the car on December 20, 1992, at Firebird International Raceway in Arizona. He showed signs of competitiveness, posting the fastest lap record of 49.09 seconds, while veteran Emerson Fittipaldi set a benchmark lap time of 49.7 seconds.
