= Lola T92/00 =

Racing car designed and built by Lola Cars

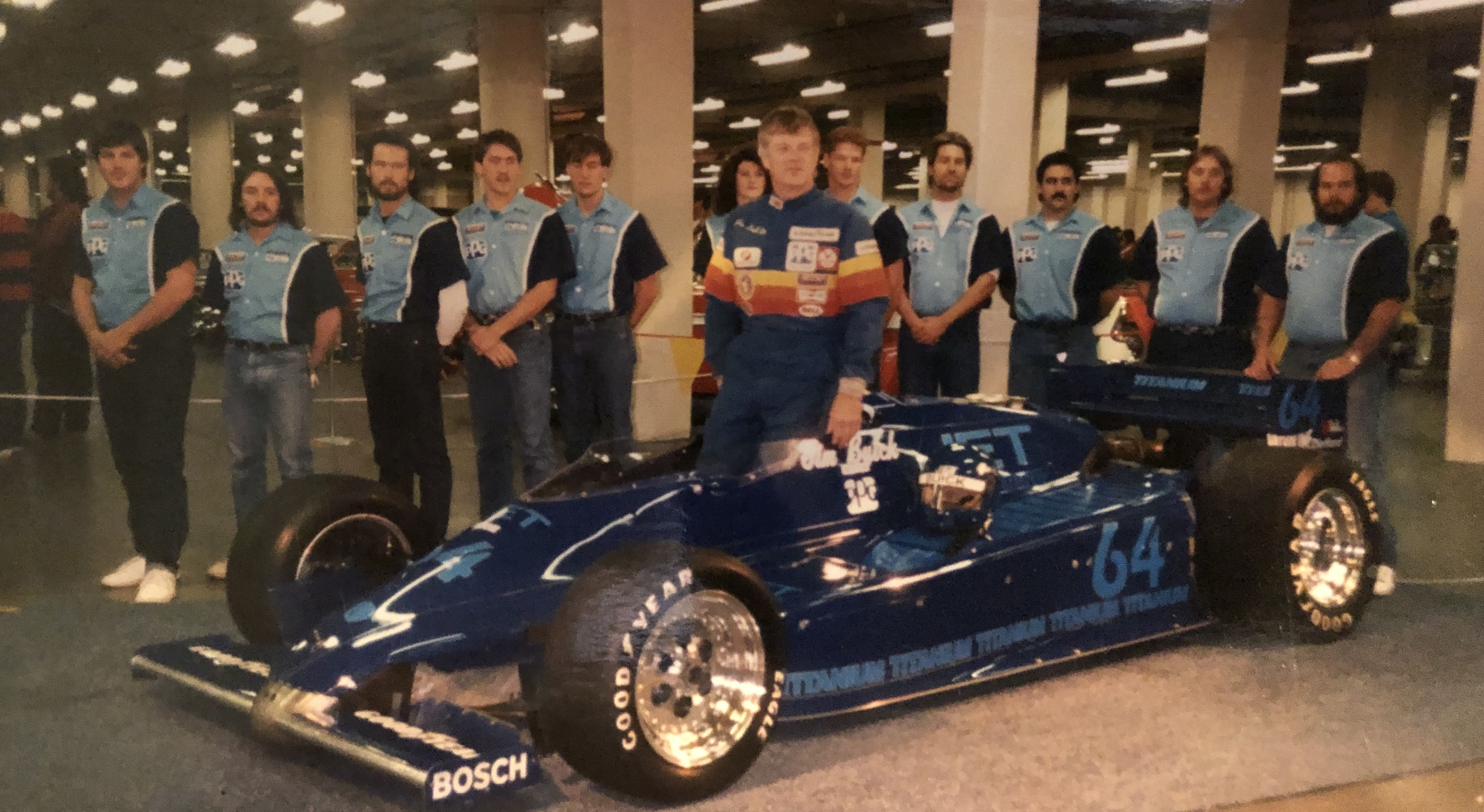
- Category: CART IndyCar
- Constructor: Lola
- Predecessor: Lola T91/00
- Successor: Lola T93/00

Technical specifications
- Length: 4,978 mm (196 in)
- Width: 2,032 mm (80 in)
- Height: 940 mm (37 in)
- Axle track: 1,753 mm (69 in) (Front); 1,638 mm (64 in) (Rear)
- Wheelbase: 3,048 mm (120 in)
- Engine: Ford-Cosworth XB V8 turbo engine Ilmor-Chevrolet 265-A V8 turbo engine Buick Indy V6 turbo engine 2.65–3.43 L (2,650–3,430 cc; 162–209 cu in) mid-engined
- Transmission: 6-speed manual
- Weight: 1,550 lb (700 kg)
- Fuel: Methanol
- Tyres: Goodyear

Competition history
- Debut: 1992 Daikyo IndyCar Grand Prix

The Lola T92/00 is a highly successful open-wheel racing car chassis, designed and built by Lola Cars that competed in the CART open-wheel racing series, for competition in the 1992 IndyCar season. It was extremely competitive, winning 10 out of the 16 races that season, and clinching 14 total pole positions, including the opening round in Australia, and the special Marlboro Challenge event at Nazareth. It was mainly powered by the 800–850 hp (600–630 kW) Ford/Cosworth XB turbo engine, but some also used the Ilmor-Chevrolet 265-A V8 turbo engine, or the Buick Indy V6 turbo engine with this chassis. It powered Bobby Rahal to his third and final IndyCar World Drivers' Championship.

A total of 26 chassis were manufactured and Newman/Haas Racing owned 5.
