= Marlboro Challenge =

Auto race held 1987-92

The Marlboro Challenge was an all-star race in the CART series held from 1987 to 1992, sponsored by cigarette brand Marlboro. After 1992, the race was discontinued, in part because Phillip Morris reorganized its race sponsorship after the Marlboro Grand Prix of New York fell through. The race was considered a non-points exhibition race, and did not count towards championship standings or official statistics.

Twelve drivers qualified for the 1987 race, although only ten started the race. In the other editions, ten drivers were selected. The selection criteria were as follows: all race winners and pole position winners since the previous year's Marlboro Challenge; previous year's season champion; and defending Indianapolis 500 winner. If the field was still small, it could be filled out by top race finishers (most second places, third places, etc.) in the current season's standings.

In most years the event was held in conjunction with the final race weekend of the season, but in some years it was at the second-to-last race. The race distance each year was approximately 100 miles, which normally required one pit stop for fuel. The distance was typically one half the accompanying points-paying race distance (≈200 miles). It was held at three different locations during its history:

- Tamiami Park (1987–1988)
- Laguna Seca (1989, 1991)
- Pennsylvania International Raceway (1990, 1992)

== Winners ==
Season	Date	Location	Driver	Chassis	Engine	Team	Ref
1987	October 31	Tamiami Park	(United States) Bobby Rahal	Lola	Cosworth	Truesports	
1988	November 5	Tamiami Park	(United States) Michael Andretti	Lola	Cosworth	Kraco Racing	
1989	October 14	Laguna Seca	(United States) Al Unser Jr.	Lola	Chevrolet	Galles Racing	
1990	October 6	Nazareth	(United States) Rick Mears	Penske	Chevrolet	Penske Racing	
1991	October 19	Laguna Seca	(United States) Michael Andretti	Lola	Chevrolet	Newman/Haas Racing	
1992	October 3	Nazareth	(Brazil) Emerson Fittipaldi	Penske	Chevrolet	Penske Racing	

=== Race summaries ===
==== 1987 ====
The inaugural Marlboro Challenge was held at Tamiami Park, and featured a field of race winners, pole position winners, and top drivers in the points standings from the 1987 season. Drivers were required to make at least one pit stop (changing at least two tires and adding at least 5 gallons of fuel) during the 42-lap race. Raul Boesel started from the pole, but Bobby Rahal jumped into the lead at the start. Rahal gave up the lead when he pitted on lap 18, handing the lead to Emerson Fittipaldi. Fittipaldi pulled out to a 20-second lead, but he had to make his pit stop on lap 32. Meanwhile, after pitting early, Rahal was charging through the field and re-assumed the lead during Fittipaldi's stop. Fittipaldi charged to catch Rahal, but ran out of fuel on the final lap as Rahal drove to victory.

==== 1988 ====
Heavy rain delayed the start of the race by over an hour, and the race started with a damp track at Tamiami Park. Al Unser Jr. took the early lead, but Michael Andretti who started sixth charged through the field in the early going. On lap 20, Unser and Andretti became locked in a fierce battle all the way to the finish. With the track beginning to dry, Andretti switched to slicks during his pit stop on lap 30, as did Unser. On lap 33. Andretti emerged as the leader, but the two cars were nose-to-tail. With two laps to go, the leaders were dicing through traffic, and Unser attempted to pass for the lead going into turn 9. Unser hit a deep puddle of standing water which caused the car to bobble, spin, and crash into the outside wall. Michael Andretti avoided contact, and drove to victory.

==== 1989 ====
The race turned into a battle of fuel mileage calculations. Al Unser Jr. stretched his fuel to the finish, and captured the Marlboro Challenge in its first running at Laguna Seca. Unser ran out of fuel pulling into victory lane, after holding off second place Danny Sullivan by 4 seconds at the finish line. Sullivan grabbed second when Emerson Fittipaldi ran out of fuel on the final lap. Bobby Rahal came home third, throwing an aggressive block on Teo Fabi down the homestretch.

==== 1990 ====
The race moved to Nazareth, the first time being held on an oval. Rick Mears started 3rd, but slipped to 4th position after the start. He worked his way to the front of the field by lap 66 (of 100). After a pit stop on lap 72, Mears made the handling adjustments he needed to pull out to a 9-second lead. However, over the final handful of laps, Mears was stuck behind the lapped car of Mario Andretti, which slowed his pace. Second place Emerson Fittipaldi closed the gap; but Fittipaldi had trouble himself getting around Arie Luyendyk. Mears finally cleared the traffic, and held on for a 4.2 second victory over Fittipaldi.

==== 1991 ====
The event was back at Laguna Seca for 1991. Rick Mears led 42 of the 45 laps, and was leading second place Michael Andretti on the final lap. Mears was poised to win a total of $425,000 which included a $125,000 bonus for winning two of the three legs of the Marlboro Million. On the final corner of the final lap, Mears suddenly slowed. A fuel pickup problem caused the car to sputter, and Michael Andretti pounced, darting by and taking the lead in the final few hundred yards. Andretti won, becoming the first two-time winner of the Marlboro Challenge.

==== 1992 ====
The final edition of the Marlboro Challenge was held at Nazareth, the second time at that track. Bobby Rahal and Michael Andretti dominated much of the race, leading the first 62 laps between themselves, but controversy erupted after a caution came out on lap 54. On lap 56, Rahal, Andretti, and Emerson Fittipaldi all ducked into the pits for their mandatory pit stop. Exiting the pits, CART officials ruled that both Rahal and Andretti passed the pace car before crossing the blend line, and issued both drivers a stop-and-go penalty. Rahal was later issued a second black flag penalty for an alleged fuel leak, which dropped him to 6th. The competition went from a three-car battle to just Fittipaldi, who cruised unchallenged the remainder of the race to victory.

== Marlboro Million ==
During its tenure, from 1988–1991, the race was part of the Marlboro Million bonus program, which was similar to NASCAR's Winston Million. Any driver who won the Marlboro Grand Prix at the Meadowlands, the Marlboro 500 at Michigan, and Marlboro Challenge in the same season, would win a $1,000,000 bonus. The first driver to win two of the three races was eligible for a $150,000 bonus. The award was never achieved, and no driver won two of the three races in the set in a year.

In 1991, Rick Mears was leading the Marlboro Challenge on the final lap when his car sputtered in the final turn due to low fuel pressure. He had won the Marlboro 500 earlier that year, and would have won the $150,000 bonus had he held on over the final few seconds to win.

=== Marlboro Million results ===
Season	Meadowlands	Michigan	Challenge	Notes
1988	Al Unser Jr.	Danny Sullivan	Michael Andretti	
1989	Bobby Rahal	Michael Andretti	Al Unser Jr.	
1990	Michael Andretti	Al Unser Jr.	Rick Mears	
1991	Bobby Rahal	Rick Mears	Michael Andretti	Mears finished 2nd in the Challenge

== See also ==
- 2024 $1 Million Challenge - non-championship event held by the IndyCar Series in 2024
