= Buick Indy V6 engine =

Buick Indy V6
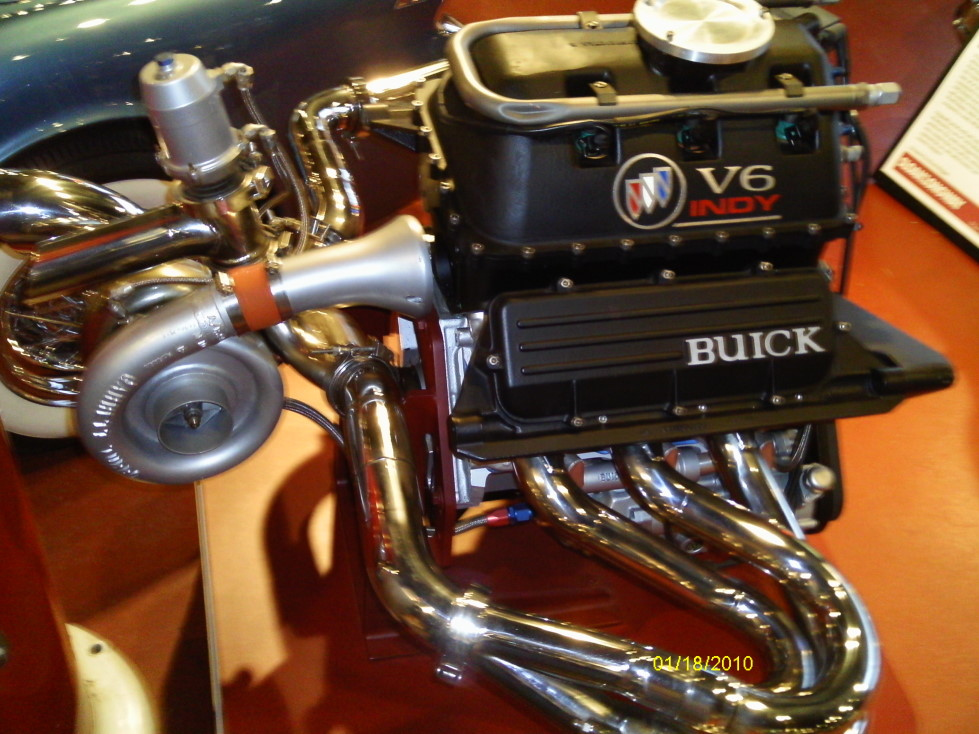

Overview
- Manufacturer: Buick
- Production: 1982–1997

Layout
- Configuration: 90° V6
- Displacement: 3.0–3.42 L (183–209 cu in)
- Cylinder bore: 4 in (100 mm)
- Piston stroke: 2.75–3.625 in (70–92 mm)
- Valvetrain: OHV, two-valves per cylinder
- Compression ratio: 9.5:1

Combustion
- Turbocharger: Garrett
- Fuel system: Mechanical multi-point fuel injection
- Fuel type: Gasoline/Methanol
- Oil system: Dry sump

Output
- Power output: 800–900 hp (597–671 kW)
- Torque output: 550 lb⋅ft (746 N⋅m)

The Buick Indy V6 engine is a turbocharged, 3.0–3.4 L (180–210 cu in), V6, Indy car racing internal combustion engine, designed and produced by Buick for use in the CART PPG Indy Car World Series, and later the IRL IndyCar Series; between 1982 and 1997. It shares the same architecture, and mechanical design, and is based on the Buick V6 road car engine. A slightly destroked 3.0-liter V6 engine was also used in the March 85G and March 86G IMSA GTP sports prototypes.

Though the Buick engine never won a CART series race, it did see some success at the Indianapolis 500, which was sanctioned singly by USAC. This was largely because USAC permitted the non-overhead cam "stock block" pushrod engines a higher level of turbocharger "boost" (55 inHG) than CART's rules allowed. This made the engine attractive to smaller teams competing in the Indy 500; giving them a chance to compete with the higher budget teams, many of which ran the powerful Ilmor-Chevy or the Cosworth.

Though the Buick engine had notorious reliability issues for the 500 miles, it often excelled in qualifying. Pancho Carter won the pole position with a Buick at the 1985 Indianapolis 500, and Gary Bettenhausen was the fastest qualifier in 1991. Roberto Guerrero became the first driver to break the 230 mph barrier in time trials, winning the pole for the 1992 race. Jim Crawford led eight laps and finished 6th in 1988, and Al Unser Sr. notched Buick's best Indy finish with a third in 1992. A derivative engine known as the Menard V-6 was released in 1993 and utilized through 1996, however, without Buick factory support.

== Applications ==
=== Indy Cars ===
- March 82C
- March 83C
- March 84C
- March 85C
- March 86C
- March 87C
- March 88C
- Lola T89/00
- Lola T90/00
- Lola T91/00
- Lola T92/00
- Lola T93/00
- Lola T95/00

=== IMSA GTP/Group C sports prototypes ===
- Alba AR3-001
- March 85G
- March 86G
- Alba AR8-001
- Alba AR9-001
- Alba AR20-01
