= Lola T91/00 =

Racing car designed and built by Lola Cars

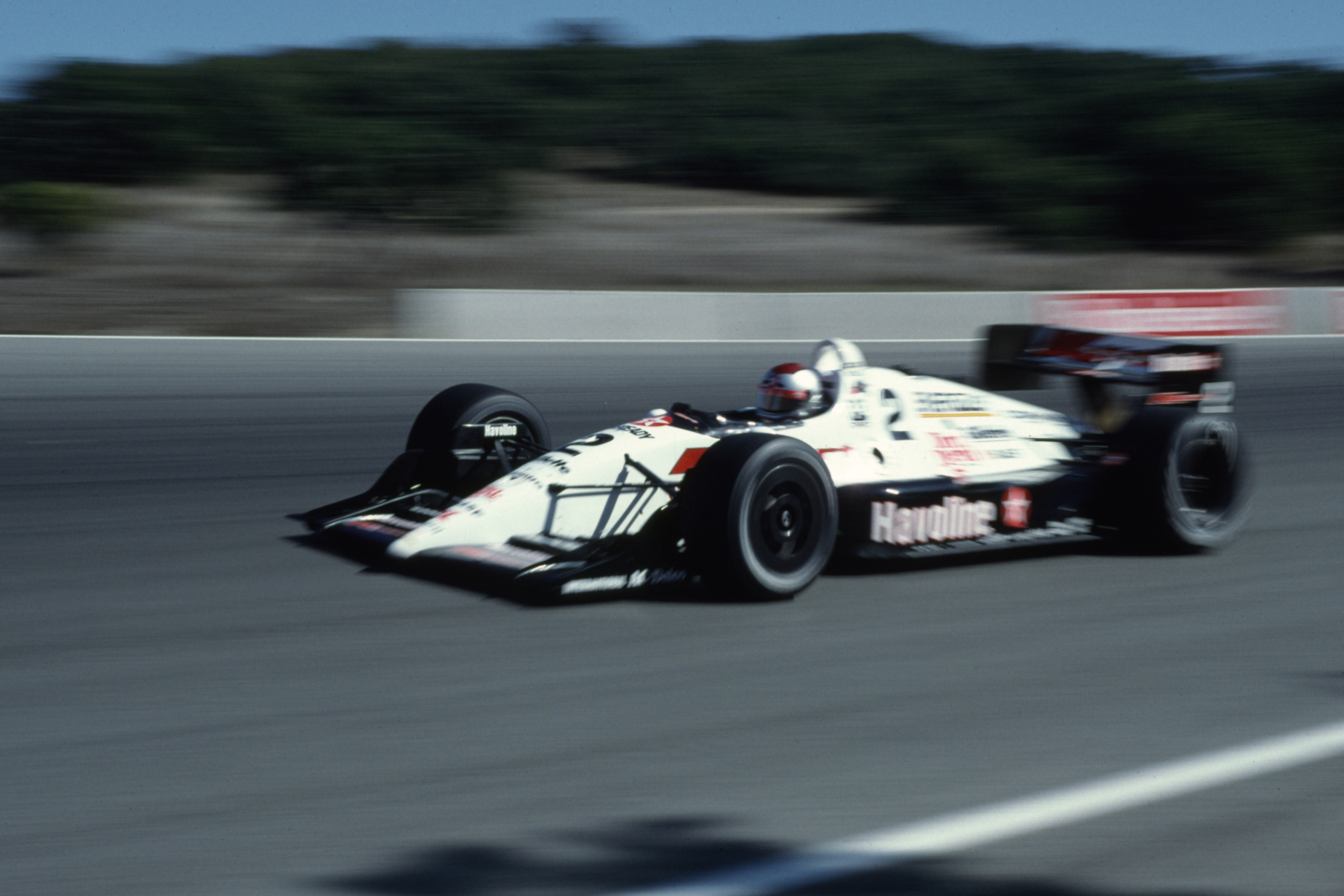
- Category: CART IndyCar
- Constructor: Lola
- Predecessor: Lola T90/00
- Successor: Lola T92/00

Technical specifications
- Length: 4,978 mm (196 in)
- Width: 2,032 mm (80 in)
- Height: 940 mm (37 in)
- Axle track: 1,753 mm (69 in) (Front); 1,638 mm (64 in) (Rear)
- Wheelbase: 3,048 mm (120 in)
- Engine: Chevrolet 2.65 L (2,650 cc; 162 cu in) V8 mid-engined
- Transmission: 6-speed manual
- Weight: 1,550 lb (700 kg)
- Fuel: Methanol
- Tyres: Goodyear

Competition history
- Notable drivers: Michael Andretti; Mario Andretti; Bobby Rahal; Al Unser Jr. Arie Luyendyk; Eddie Cheever
- Debut: 1991 Gold Coast IndyCar Grand Prix; Surfers Paradise, Australia
Wins	Poles
14	16

The Lola T91/00 is a highly successful open-wheel racing car chassis, designed and built by Lola Cars that competed in the CART open-wheel racing series, for competition in the 1991 IndyCar season. It was the most dominant car that season, and extremely competitive, winning a total of 14 out of the 17 races during the 1991 season, with Michael Andretti enjoying the most considerable success, scoring 8 wins, taking 8 pole positions, and leading more laps than any other driver that season. Al Unser Jr. and Arie Luyendyk scored 2 wins, while Bobby Rahal and John Andretti scored one win each. Even though Bobby Rahal won only one race, he had 11 podium finishes, and 13 top 10s, making him a very serious challenger and competitor for the title that year. Michael Andretti eventually went on to win the 1991 IndyCar World Drivers' Championship with this car. It was powered by the 720–800 hp (540–600 kW) Ilmor-Chevrolet 265-A turbo engine.

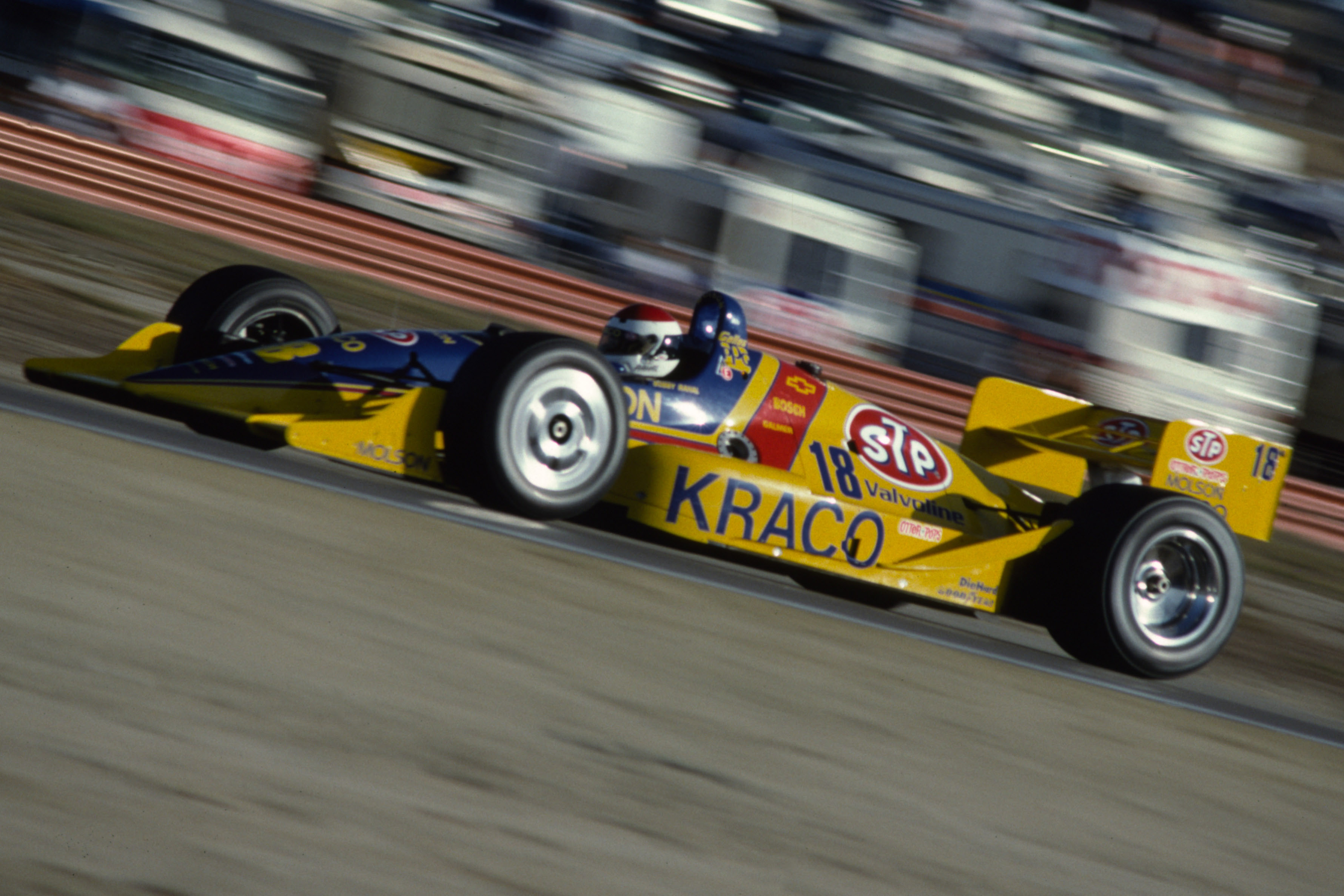
Bobby Rahal's T91/00 at Laguna Seca in 1991

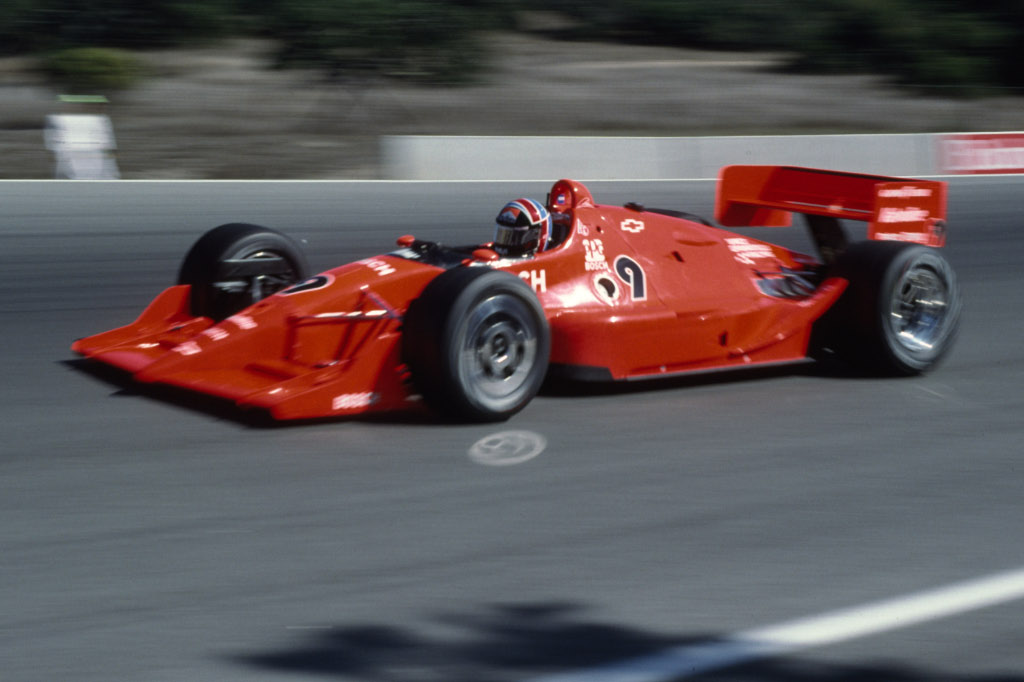
Arie Luyendyk's T91/00 at Laguna Seca in 1991

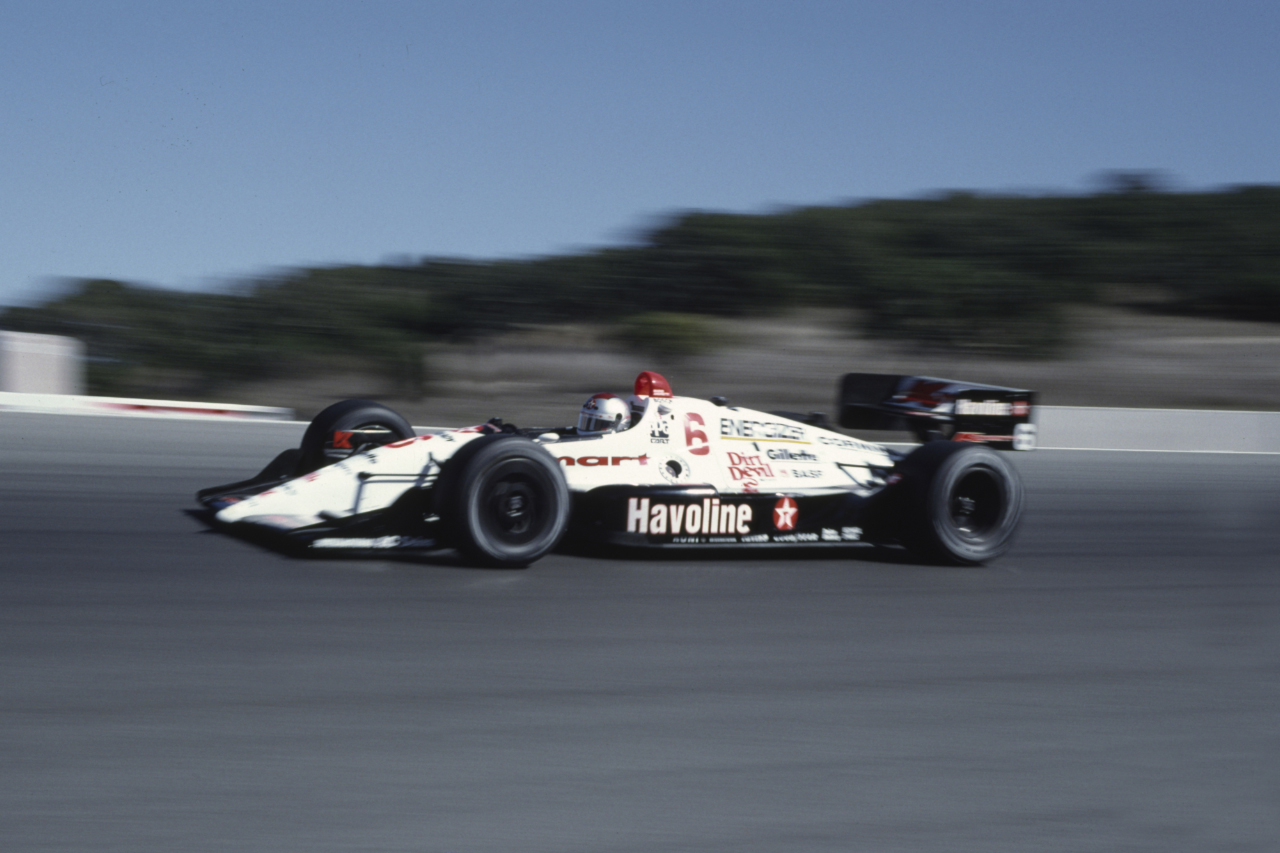
Mario Andretti's T91/00 at Laguna Seca in 1991

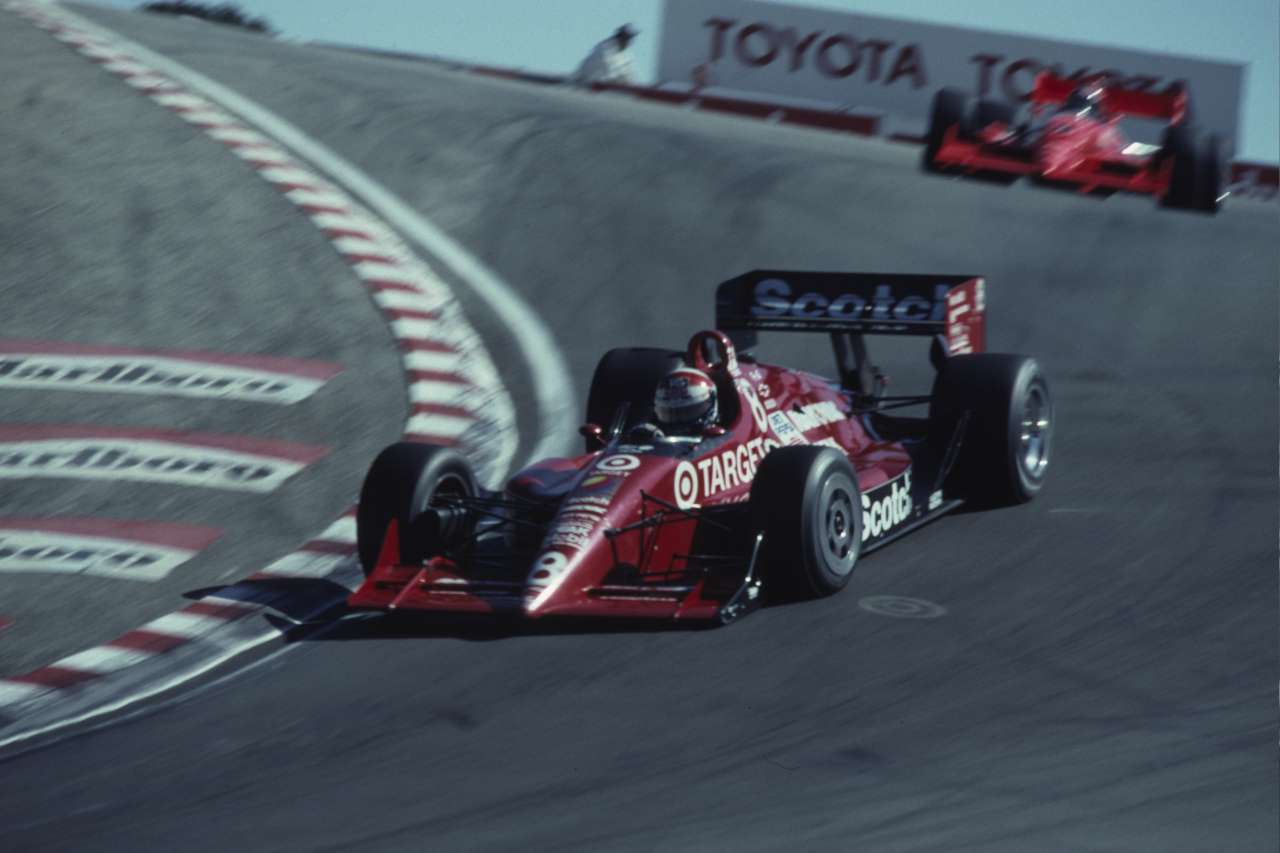
Eddie Cheever rounding the corkscrew in his T91/00 at Laguna Seca in 1991
