= 1988 Pocono 500 =

(United States) 1988 Pocono 500
Race details
- 10th round of the 1988 CART PPG Indy Car World Series season
- Date: August 21, 1988
- Official name: 1988 Quaker State 500
- Location: Long Pond, Pennsylvania
- Course: Permanent racing facility 2.5 mi / 4.023 km
- Distance: 200 laps 500 mi / 804.672 km
- Weather: Temperatures up to 76 °F (24 °C); wind speeds up to 21 miles per hour (34 km/h)

Pole position
- Driver: (United States) Rick Mears (Team Penske)
- Time: 204.564 mph

Podium
- First: (United States) Bobby Rahal (Truesports)
- Second: (United States) Al Unser Jr. (Galles Racing)
- Third: (Colombia) Roberto Guerrero (Vince Granatelli Racing)

The 1988 Pocono 500, the 18th running of the event, was held at the Pocono Raceway in Long Pond, Pennsylvania, on Sunday, August 21, 1988. Branded as the 1988 Quaker State 500 for sponsorship reasons, the race was won by Bobby Rahal, the first and only win for the Judd engine in Indy car racing. It was also the last win for the Truesports team.

== Background ==
Rick Mears won his third Indianapolis 500 in May. Danny Sullivan won the Michigan 500.

The 1988 CART Season was dominated by the Ilmor Chevrolet Indy V-8 engine. The first nine races were won by the Chevrolet engine while Cosworth and Judd were winless entering the Pocono 500.

== Practice and Time Trials ==
=== Practice - Thursday, August 18 ===
During practice on Thursday, August 18, Mario Andretti posted the fastest speed at 199.358 mph. Derek Daly was second fastest at 196.083 mph. Phil Krueger and Rich Vogler crashed in turn one in separate accidents but the cars were repaired. An estimated 10 tires were cut during practice, blamed on Pocono's boiler-plate metal wall that did not sit flush with the asphalt surface like a concrete wall. Debris was able to get under the wall and roll onto the track. Andretti was quoted as saying, "if you had a concrete wall, you wouldn't have that problem."

=== Qualifying - Friday, August 19 ===
In Friday morning's practice, Rick Mears posted the fastest speed at 205.761 mph.

Early in the afternoon qualifying session, Danny Sullivan posted a speed of 203.358 mph. Sullivan's time was the fastest until Rick Mears went out late and took pole position with a speed of 204.564 mph. Bobby Rahal was third fastest at 202.520 mph. Rick Mears became the first driver to win the pole for all three 500 mile races in a single season.

1983 Pocono 500 winner, Teo Fabi, crashed on lap one of his qualifying run when he ran wide in turn three and hit the wall. He went to a backup car and qualified on Saturday. In Saturday's qualifying session, Phil Krueger posted a speed of 187.825 mph, but was disqualified due to the rear wing being set back too far. Krueger was allowed to start the race with a promoter's option.

Dale Coyne qualified at a speed of 167.835 mph. He was not allowed to start the race because his speed did not meet CART's rule that all qualifiers must be within 115% of the pole speed.

== Support Races ==
The 40 lap, American Racing Series event was held on Saturday. Jon Beekhuis led the first two laps. Tommy Byrne took the lead on lap three. Michael Greenfield, in a car co-owned by Chip Ganassi and Pat Patrick, took the lead on lap eight and led for the next 29 laps. A spin by Beekhuis and Mike Snow set up a four-lap run to the finish. On the restart, Byrne passed Greenfield entering turn one and pulled out to a sizable lead. On the final lap, Byrne caught a slow car in turn two and had to let off the throttle, allowing Greenfield to catch and pass him. It was Greenfield's first win in the series.

A 24-lap, 60 mile race for the SCCA RaceTruck Challenge was held on Saturday afternoon. 19 year-old actor, Jason Bateman, was making his second start in the series, driving a Mitsubishi Mighty Max. On lap one, polesitter, Richie Agresti spun in turn two. Agresti slid across the track and was hit hard by Bateman in the left front. Bateman's truck got airborne and landed on its roof. The impact pushed the left-front wheel back into the cockpit and broke Bateman's left ankle.

Driving a Jeep Comanche, Al Unser led the first seven laps before dropping back to 19th. Tommy Archer beat his brother Bobby by 0.06 seconds to win the race.

== Race ==
Sławomir Wałęsa, the 15-year-old son of Polish statesman Lech Wałęsa, delivered the command to start engines in Polish and English. The pace car was a custom Ferrari Mondial built at a cost of one million dollars as a gift to series sponsor, PPG. It was driven by Kevin Cogan who was missing the race due to a broken left forearm suffered at Toronto in July.

Polesitter, Rick Mears held the lead on the start. On lap two, the caution came out when Dick Simon's engine started smoking. On the restart, Danny Sullivan took the lead. Before one lap was completed, Arie Luyendyk crashed in turn three. He was hospitalized for a fractured right heel.

On lap 28, Michael Andretti blew an engine and brought out the third caution. Sullivan pitted after the restart, which gave the lead to Al Unser. Phil Krueger crashed after completing 42 laps. Rick Mears hit debris and damaged his suspension.

53 year-old A. J. Foyt took the lead on lap 87. It was the first time Foyt had led multiple laps in an Indy car race since Michigan in July 1984. Foyt led 14 laps before gearbox issues put him out after 132 laps. It was the last time he would lead an Indy car race.

On lap 117, Dick Simon and Mario Andretti collided entering turn three. Simon, who was 18 laps down, failed to see Andretti passing inside and cut him off. The two cars hit the wall, collecting Danny Sullivan who wrecked trying to avoid the debris. The 54 year-old Simon was heavily criticized by both Sullivan and Andretti, who suffered a bruised right thigh. "He was in the way all day," Andretti said. "He should be more concerned with the leaders. He should not be running, in my opinion."

Sullivan asked, "How many times does he have to cause something like this before someone realizes that something has to be done?" Simon only drove one more Indy car race before retiring.

During green flag pit stops on lap 168, John Andretti broke a half-shaft exiting the pits and crashed hard into an I-beam supporting the steel boiler-plate wall separating the pit road from the race track. The car split in half with the cockpit flipping several times. Andretti was extracted from the car and suffered only a fractured metatarsal bone in his left foot.

49 year-old Unser appeared headed to his first Pocono 500 win since 1978 until he suffered ignition failure while leading with 28 laps remaining. Unser had led a race-high 79 laps.

Bobby Rahal assumed the lead after Unser's retirement. He led the final 28 laps and beat Al Unser Jr. by 17 seconds. The race was slowed by 11 cautions for 65 laps. Rahal's average speed was 133.713 mph, the slowest average speed in 18 races at Pocono. It was the first and only Indy car win for the Judd engine. It was the only race in the 1988 CART season that the Ilmor Chevrolet Indy V-8 didn't win.

== Box score ==
Finish	Grid	No	Name	Entrant	Chassis	Engine	Laps	Time/Status	Led	Points
1	3	1	(United States) Bobby Rahal	Truesports	Lola T88/00	Judd	200	3:44:21.673	32	20
2	11	3	(United States) Al Unser Jr.	Galles Racing	March 88C	Ilmor-Chevrolet	200	+17.047	15	16
3	16	2	(Colombia) Roberto Guerrero	Vince Granatelli Racing	Lola T88/00	Cosworth	199	+1 Lap	0	14
4	10	10	(Republic of Ireland) Derek Daly	Raynor Motorsports	Lola T88/00	Cosworth	199	+1 Laps	0	12
5	9	30	(Brazil) Raul Boesel	Doug Shierson Racing	Lola T88/00	Cosworth	197	+3 Laps	0	10
6	17	71	(United States) Gordon Johncock	Hemelgarn Racing	Lola T88/00	Cosworth	195	+5 Laps	0	8
7	18	21	(United States) Howdy Holmes	Alex Morales Motorsports	March 88C	Cosworth	195	+5 Laps	0	6
8	24	12	(Canada) John Jones	Arciero Racing	March 88C	Cosworth	195	+5 Laps	0	5
9	20	56	(United States) Billy Vukovich III	Gohr Racing	March 88C	Cosworth	195	+5 Laps	0	4
10	7	91	(United States) Scott Brayton	Hemelgarn Racing	Lola T88/00	Judd	194	+6 Laps	0	3
11	22	11	(United States) Rich Vogler	Machinists Union Racing	March 87C	Cosworth	192	+8 Laps	0	2
12	23	55	(United States) Scott Atchison	Machinists Union Racing	March 86C	Cosworth	187	+13 Laps	0	1
13	4	60	(United States) Al Unser	Penske Racing	Penske PC-17	Ilmor-Chevrolet	182	Ignition	79	1
14	13	98	(United States) John Andretti	Mike Curb Racing	Lola T88/00	Cosworth	166	Crash	0	0
15	15	16	(United States) Tony Bettenhausen Jr.	Bettenhausen Motorsports	Lola T87/00	Cosworth	135	Engine	0	0
16	6	14	(United States) A. J. Foyt	A. J. Foyt Enterprises	Lola T88/00	Cosworth	132	Gearbox	14	0
17	5	6	(United States) Mario Andretti	Newman/Haas Racing	Lola T88/00	Ilmor-Chevrolet	116	Crash	25	0
18	2	9	(United States) Danny Sullivan	Penske Racing	Penske PC-17	Ilmor-Chevrolet	116	Crash	31	0
19	21	22	(United States) Dick Simon	Dick Simon Racing	Lola T87/00	Cosworth	98	Crash	0	0
20	19	24	(United States) Randy Lewis	Leader Card Racers	Lola T88/00	Cosworth	78	Gearbox	0	0
21	8	20	(Brazil) Emerson Fittipaldi	Patrick Racing	Lola T87/00	Ilmor-Chevrolet	59	Oil leak	0	0
22	26	77	(United States) Phil Krueger	US Engineering	March 86C	Cosworth	42	Crash	0	0
23	1	5	(United States) Rick Mears	Penske Racing	Penske PC-17	Ilmor-Chevrolet	42	Crash	4	1
24	25	8	(Italy) Teo Fabi	Porsche Motorsports	March 88C	Porsche	35	Suspension	0	0
25	12	18	(United States) Michael Andretti	Kraco Racing	Lola T88/00	Cosworth	28	Engine	0	0
26	14	7	(Netherlands) Arie Luyendyk	Dick Simon Racing	Lola T88/00	Cosworth	5	Crash	0	0

=== Failed to qualify ===
- (United States) Dale Coyne (#19)

=== Race statistics ===
Lap Leaders
Laps	Leader
1–4	Rick Mears
5–33	Danny Sullivan
34–75	Al Unser
76–84	Mario Andretti
85–86	Danny Sullivan
87–100	A. J. Foyt
101–116	Mario Andretti
117–131	Al Unser Jr.
132–145	Al Unser
146–149	Bobby Rahal
150–172	Al Unser
173–200	Bobby Rahal

Cautions: 11 for 65 laps
Laps	Reason
2–5	Dick Simon smoking
5–12	Arie Luyendyk crash turn 3
28–31	Michael Andretti engine
36–39	Teo Fabi stopped on track
45–51	Rick Mears and Phil Krueger crash turn 2
62–68	Emerson Fittipaldi stopped on track
93–99	Debris
117–127	Mario Andretti, Danny Sullivan, and Dick Simon crash turn 3
135–138	A. J. Foyt stopped on track
143–149	Tony Bettenhausen Jr. engine
169–181	John Andretti crash pit lane

== Aftermath ==
Criticism of the track conditions became more vocal in 1988. Drivers were upset with the bumpy and weathered asphalt and openly hoped that the track would be repaved. Race-winner Rick Mears said "this is a great place to come to race, provided they do resurface it. The drivers think it's a fun track, a great track." Danny Sullivan said, "It would be nice if they would resurface it like they're doing at Indianapolis now." Emerson Fittipaldi said, "If you want my opinion, we shouldn't run here. The surface is so rough, in one practice session, I missed my pit twice because I couldn't get the car stopped, it bounced."

== Broadcasting ==
While the race began at noon, NBC aired a delayed broadcast of the race at 4 p.m. that afternoon. Charlie Jones and Johnny Rutherford were the play-by-play announcers. Gary Gerould and Sally Larvick were the pit reporters.
