= 1988 Michigan 500 =

Coordinates: 42°03′58.68″N 84°14′29.18″W

(United States) 1988 Michigan 500
Race details
- Race 9 of 15 in the 1988 CART season
- Date: August 7, 1988
- Official name: 1988 Marlboro 500
- Location: Michigan International Speedway, Brooklyn, Michigan, United States
- Course: Permanent racing facility 2.000 mi / 3.219 km
- Distance: 250 laps 500.000 mi / 804.672 km
- Weather: Partly Cloudy with temperatures up to 91 °F (33 °C); wind speeds reaching up to 13 miles per hour (21 km/h)

Pole position
- Driver: (United States) Rick Mears (Team Penske)
- Time: 218.427 mph (351.524 km/h)

Podium
- First: (United States) Danny Sullivan (Team Penske)
- Second: (United States) Bobby Rahal (Truesports)
- Third: (United States) Michael Andretti (Kraco Enterprises)

The 1988 Michigan 500, the eighth running of the event, was held at the Michigan International Speedway in Brooklyn, Michigan, on Sunday, August 7, 1988. Branded as the 1988 Marlboro 500 for sponsorship reasons, the race was won by Danny Sullivan, his first Michigan 500 victory and the first Michigan 500 win for Team Penske at the track Roger Penske owned. The event was race number 9 of 15 in the 1988 CART PPG Indy Car World Series.

== Background ==
In 1988, Marlboro introduced the Marlboro Million, offering a one million dollar prize should a driver win the Marlboro Grand Prix at the Meadowlands, the Marlboro 500 at Michigan, and the Marlboro Challenge. Two weeks before the Marlboro 500, Al Unser Jr. won the Marlboro Grand Prix and entered Michigan still eligible for the Marlboro Million.

In May, Rick Mears won the 1988 Indianapolis 500.

Roberto Guerrero suffered severe head injuries in a testing crash at Indianapolis in September 1987. After spending 17 days in a coma, he recovered and returned to racing in early 1988. After finishing second in the season opener, Guerrero had a series of poor runs. Feeling he was performing poorly, he stepped out of the car. After a month away, Guerrero returned at the Michigan 500.

A. J. Foyt was hospitalized a day before practice began with abdominal ailments. He hired Johnny Rutherford to drive his car. Rutherford was scheduled to do color commentary for ESPN's broadcast of the race.

== Practice and Time Trials ==
In Thursday's opening practice, Rick Mears set the fastest speed at 218.612 mph. His teammate Al Unser was second at 216.028 mph. Mario Andretti was third at 215.892 mph. Gordon Johncock impressed with the 8th fastest speed at 210.422 mph. It was Johncock's first race at Michigan since 1984.

In Friday morning's practice session, Rick Mears ran a lap of 221.2 mph with cool, overcast conditions. Wind picked up for the afternoon time trials. On his first attempt at qualifying, Rick Mears returned to the pits after a gust of wind pushed him towards the wall on his warmup lap. After putting on an old set of tires, Mears returned to the track and ran a lap of 218.427 mph to win the pole. Al Unser qualified second with a speed of 216.060 mph. Mario Andretti joined the Penske cars on the front row with a speed of 215.673 mph.

On Saturday, the International Race of Champions competed at Michigan. NASCAR Winston Cup driver Geoff Bodine took Dick Simon's backup car out for four test laps on Saturday morning. Bodine's fastest lap was 200.781 mph. Bodine went on to win the IROC race that afternoon.

== Race ==
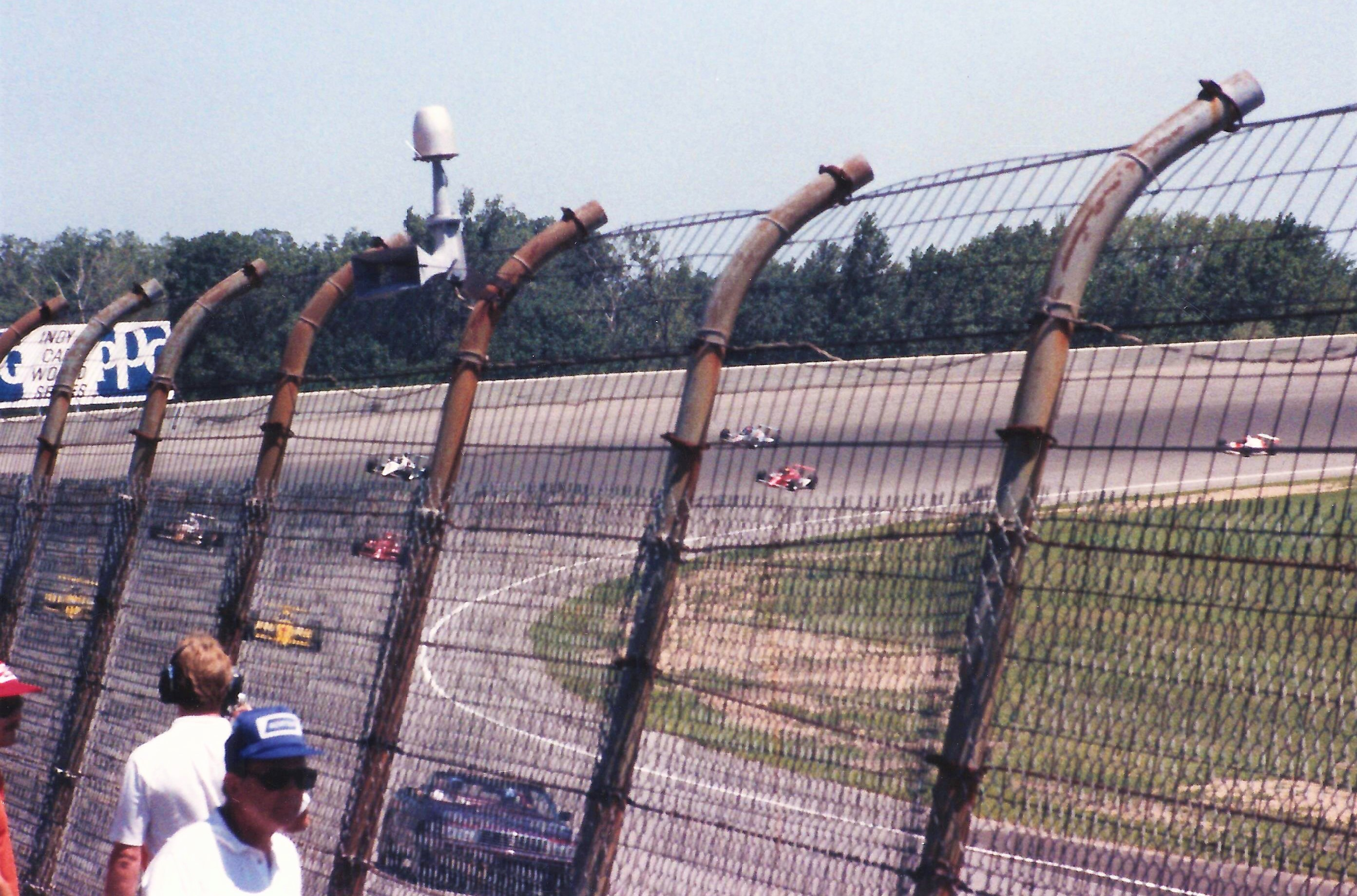
The start of the 1988 Marlboro 500

A crowd of 65,000 spectators filled the grandstands for the eighth annual Michigan 500. Prior to the race, Danny Sullivan was suffering from the flu and was unsure if he could run the entire race.

When the race began, Rick Mears pulled out to a sizable lead. He was remained in the lead for most of the first 150 laps, leading 94 laps in total. Mears was challenged at times by Emerson Fittipaldi, Al Unser, Mario Andretti, and Bobby Rahal, who all took turns at the lead.

On lap 143, Derek Daly hit oil on the track and hit the wall in turn three. Daly was unhurt. Under caution, Al Unser spun on pit road. On the restart from Daly's crash, Mears suffered a failure of the CV Joint. His team replaced the part in 30 laps, but retired from the race with engine failure after completing 177 laps.

Danny Sullivan inherited the lead following Mears's mechanical failure. Al Unser led 19 laps but also dropped out of the race with engine failure after 216 laps were completed.

The final caution came out with 11 laps remaining when Dick Simon's car dropped fluid on the track. That set up a seven lap run to the finish with Sullivan winning by one lap over Bobby Rahal.

Sullivan's win allowed him to become the third driver to win all three of IndyCar's current 500 mile Triple Crown races. He joined Johnny Rutherford and Mario Andretti by winning at Indianapolis, Pocono, and Michigan.

It was the first win for Team Penske in the Michigan 500 at the track Roger Penske owned. Only eight of the 28 starters finished the race and Sullivan was the only Chevrolet to finish.

The race's average speed of 180.564 mph made the event the fastest 500 mile IndyCar race, breaking the record set one year prior in the 1987 Michigan 500.

== Box score ==
Finish	Grid	No	Name	Entrant	Chassis	Engine	Laps	Time/Status	Led	Points
1	5	9	(United States) Danny Sullivan	Penske Racing	Penske PC-17	Ilmor-Chevrolet	250	2:46:03.820	92	20
2	4	1	(United States) Bobby Rahal	Truesports	Lola T88/00	Judd	249	+1 Lap	18	16
3	14	18	(United States) Michael Andretti	Kraco Racing	Lola T88/00	Cosworth	247	+3 Laps	0	14
4	18	16	(United States) Tony Bettenhausen Jr.	Bettenhausen Motorsports	Lola T87/00	Cosworth	240	+10 Laps	0	12
5	22	77	(United States) Phil Krueger	US Engineering	March 86C	Cosworth	239	+11 Laps	0	10
6	9	85	(United States) Gordon Johncock	Hemelgarn Racing	Lola T88/00	Cosworth	237	+13 Laps	0	8
7	17	22	(United States) Dick Simon	Dick Simon Racing	Lola T88/00	Cosworth	227	+23 Laps	0	6
8	26	12	(Canada) John Jones	Arciero Racing	March 88C	Cosworth	221	+29 Laps	0	5
9	2	60	(United States) Al Unser	Penske Racing	Penske PC-17	Ilmor-Chevrolet	216	Engine	19	4
10	25	55	(United States) Scott Atchison	Machinists Union Racing	March 86C	Cosworth	214	+36 Laps	0	3
11	10	30	(Brazil) Raul Boesel	Doug Shierson Racing	Lola T88/00	Cosworth	211	Engine	0	2
12	3	6	(United States) Mario Andretti	Newman/Haas Racing	Lola T88/00	Ilmor-Chevrolet	180	Engine	10	1
13	1	5	(United States) Rick Mears	Penske Racing	Penske PC-17	Ilmor-Chevrolet	177	Engine	94	2
14	24	24	(United States) Randy Lewis	Leader Card Racers	Lola T88/00	Cosworth	174	Engine	0	0
15	21	11	(United States) Rich Vogler	Machinists Union Racing	March 87C	Cosworth	157	Engine	0	0
16	8	10	(Republic of Ireland) Derek Daly	Raynor Motorsports	Lola T88/00	Cosworth	135	Crash	0	0
17	23	56	(United States) Billy Vukovich III	Gohr Racing	March 88C	Cosworth	129	Oil leak	0	0
18	13	14	(United States) Johnny Rutherford	A. J. Foyt Enterprises	Lola T88/00	Cosworth	129	Fire	0	0
19	7	20	(Brazil) Emerson Fittipaldi	Patrick Racing	Lola T87/00	Ilmor-Chevrolet	121	Electrical	17	0
20	16	2	(Colombia) Roberto Guerrero	Vince Granatelli Racing	Lola T88/00	Cosworth	99	Engine	0	0
21	6	3	(United States) Al Unser Jr.	Galles Racing	March 88C	Ilmor-Chevrolet	99	Water hose	0	0
22	15	71	(United States) Tom Sneva	Hemelgarn Racing	Lola T88/00	Cosworth	93	Engine	0	0
23	27	21	(United States) Howdy Holmes	Alex Morales Motorsports	March 88C	Cosworth	85	Fatigue	0	0
24	19	98	(United States) John Andretti	Mike Curb Racing	Lola T88/00	Cosworth	60	Overheating	0	0
25	12	8	(Italy) Teo Fabi	Porsche Motorsport	March 88C	Porsche	56	Mechanical	0	0
26	20	91	(United States) Scott Brayton	Hemelgarn Racing	Lola T88/00	Judd	56	Engine	0	0
27	28	19	(United States) Dale Coyne	Dale Coyne Racing	March 86C	Chevrolet stock-block	12	Oil pressure	0	0
28	11	7	(Netherlands) Arie Luyendyk	Dick Simon Racing	Lola T88/00	Cosworth	7	Engine	0	0

=== Race statistics ===
Lap Leaders
Laps	Leader
1–34	Rick Mears
35	Mario Andretti
36–39	Al Unser
40–58	Rick Mears
59–69	Emerson Fittipaldi
70–75	Mario Andretti
76–80	Al Unser
81–86	Emerson Fittipaldi
87–104	Bobby Rahal
105–111	Al Unser
112–122	Rick Mears
123–125	Mario Andretti
126–155	Rick Mears
156–186	Danny Sullivan
187–189	Al Unser
190–250	Danny Sullivan

Cautions: 5 for 33 laps
Laps	Reason
4–8	Al Unser Jr. tow-in
41–45	Debris in turn 3
85–92	Johnny Rutherford tow-in
144–155	Derek Daly crash turn 3
239–243	Dick Simon leaking fluid

== Broadcasting ==
Pole Qualifying for the Michigan 500 was broadcast for the first time on ESPN. A one-hour, delayed telecast was aired on Saturday.

ESPN broadcast the race live, marking the first time it was broadcast on a cable network. Bob Jenkins and Steve Chassey were the play-by-play commentators. Larry Nuber reported from the pits.
