= 1988 Indianapolis 500 =

American motor race

72nd Indianapolis 500
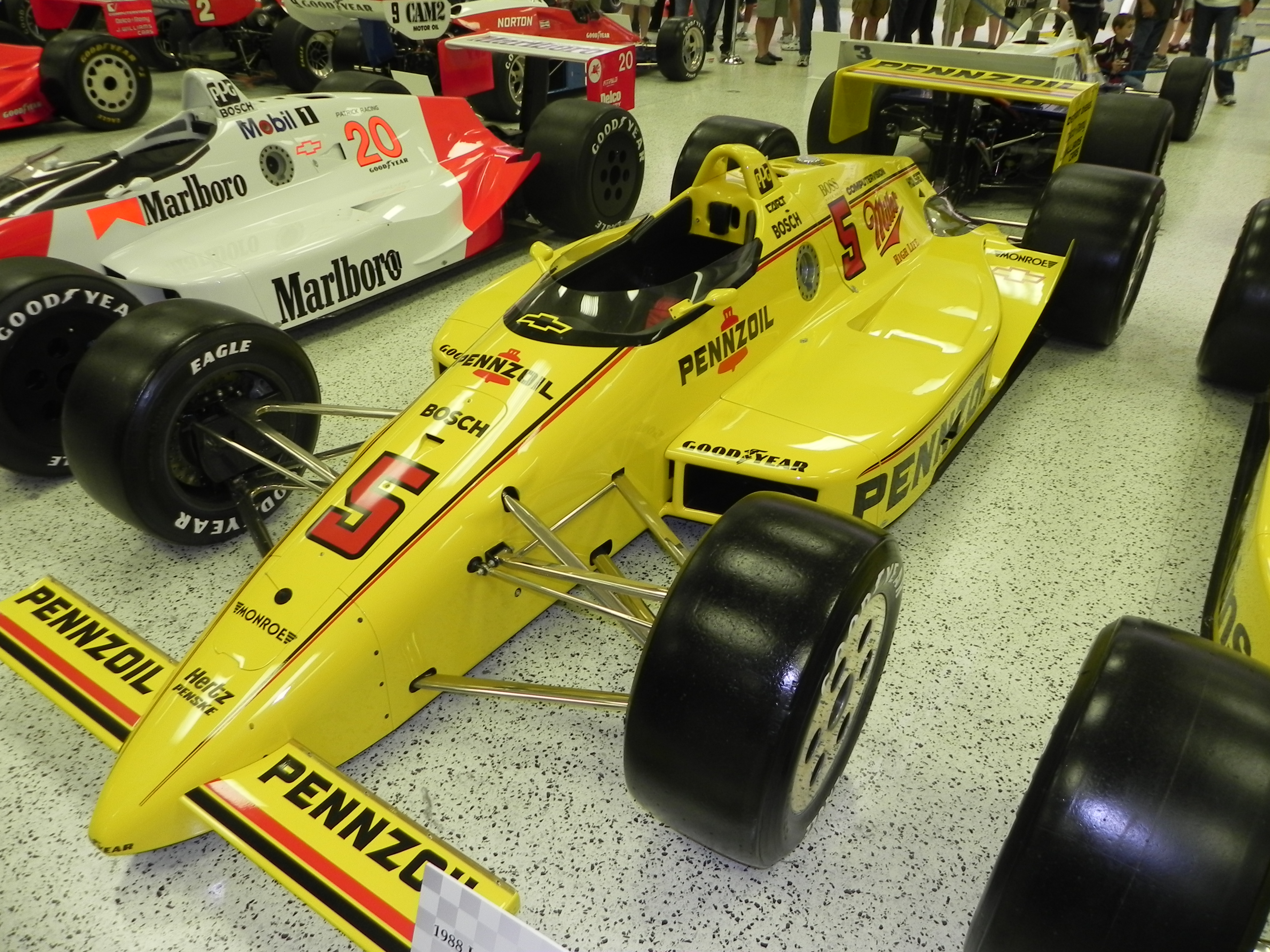

Indianapolis Motor Speedway

Indianapolis 500
- Sanctioning body: USAC
- Season: 1988 CART season 1987–88 Gold Crown
- Date: May 29, 1988
- Winner: (United States) Rick Mears
- Winning team: Penske Racing
- Winning Chief Mechanic: Peter Parrott
- Time of race: 3:27:10.204
- Average speed: 144.809 mph
- Pole position: (United States) Rick Mears
- Pole speed: 219.198 mph
- Fastest qualifier: (United States) Rick Mears
- Rookie of the Year: (United States) Billy Vukovich III
- Most laps led: (United States) Danny Sullivan (91)

Pre-race ceremonies
- National anthem: Sandi Patty
- "Back Home Again in Indiana": Jim Nabors
- Starting command: Mary F. Hulman
- Pace car: Oldsmobile Cutlass Supreme
- Pace car driver: Chuck Yeager
- Starter: Duane Sweeney
- Estimated attendance: 400,000

Television in the United States
- Network: ABC
- Announcers: Host/Lap-by-lap: Paul Page; Color Analyst: Sam Posey; Color Analyst: Bobby Unser

Chronology
Previous	Next
1987	1989

The 72nd Indianapolis 500 was held at the Indianapolis Motor Speedway in Speedway, Indiana, on Sunday May 29, 1988. Team Penske dominated the month, sweeping the top three starting positions with Rick Mears winning the pole position, Danny Sullivan at the center of the front row, and Al Unser on the outside. Mears set a new track record, becoming the first driver to break the 220 mph barrier in time trials. On race day, the three Penske teammates proceeded to lead 192 of the 200 laps, with Rick Mears taking the checkered flag, his third-career Indy 500 victory. The race represented the milestone 50th victory in Championship car racing for owner Roger Penske and Penske Racing.

The victory was the first of six consecutive Indy 500 wins by the Chevrolet Indy V-8 engine, and the first of seven consecutive overall by Ilmor-constructed powerplants. Chevrolet-powered cars swept the first five starting positions, and the top three finishing positions. The victory also marked a triumphant return of success for the Penske chassis (in this case the PC-17), after dismal results in 1987 (PC-16), and sparse use during the previous four seasons.

One year after suffering severe leg injuries, Jim Crawford returned to the cockpit, and led eight laps during the race (the only laps not led by the Penske team). Crawford finished 6th, the best finish at the time for the Buick V-6 engine. Three-time winner and Indy legend Johnny Rutherford, driving as a teammate to Crawford, turned his final lap of competition at Indy during the 1988 race. Rutherford crashed out on lap 107. He failed to qualify in 1989–1990, and again in 1992, and he formally retired in 1994.

The race was the third round of the 1988 CART PPG Indy Car World Series, and was sanctioned by USAC. Also notable for 1988 was that veteran announcer Paul Page, formerly the radio "Voice of the 500", called the race on television for the first time. It was the first of 14 years that Page anchored the telecast on ABC. Off the track, Mary F. Hulman, the widow of Tony Hulman, stepped down and was named chairman of the board emeritus of the Indianapolis Motor Speedway. Her daughter Mari Hulman George was elevated to chairperson. Mary F. Hulman, however, would continue to deliver the starting command for the race through 1996.

== Background ==
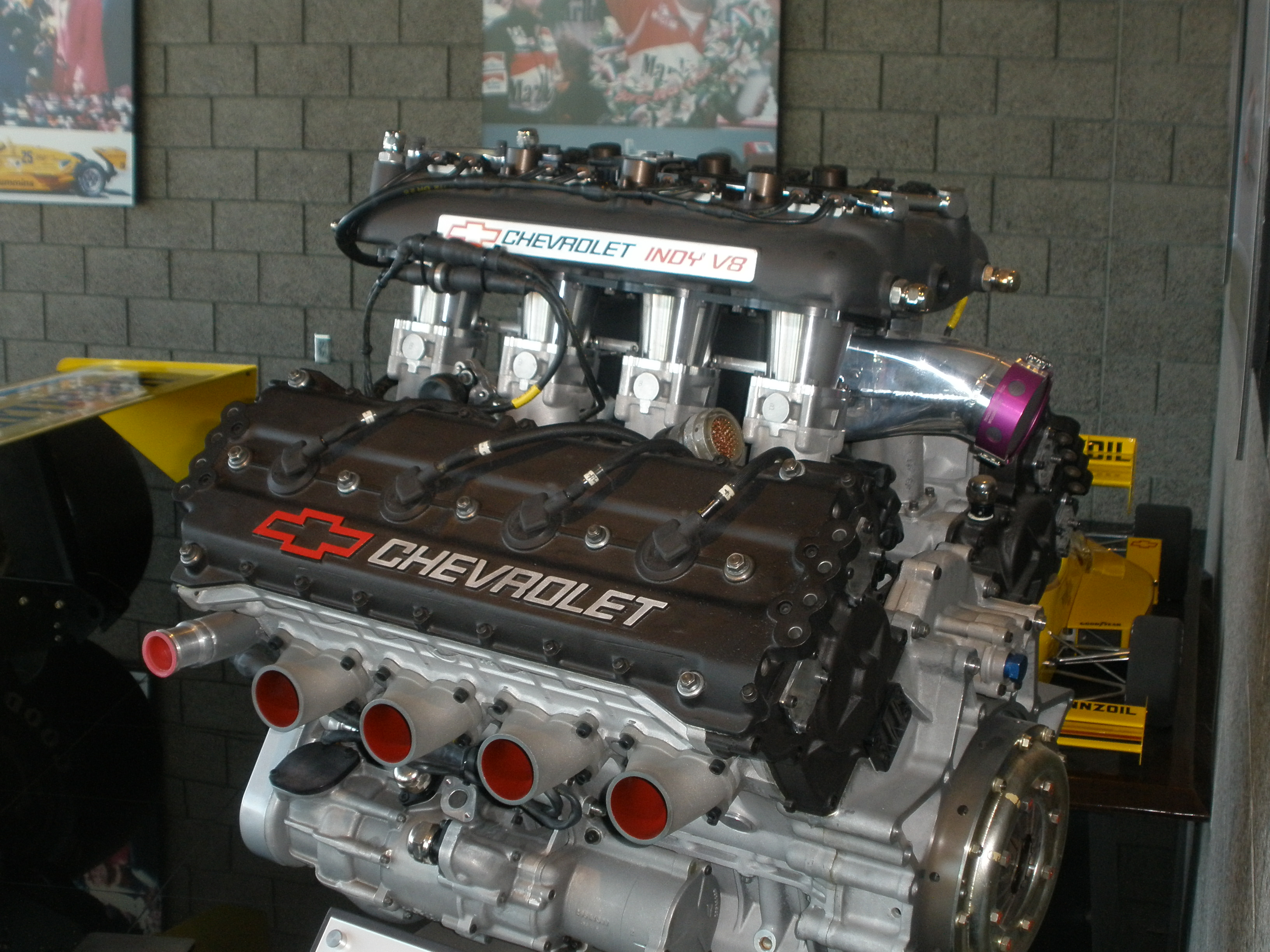
The Chevy Indy V-8 engine

After a dismal go around with the PC-16 in 1987, Penske Racing introduced the brand-new PC-17. Rick Mears and Danny Sullivan, respectively, won the pole positions for the first two races of the CART season. For the third year, Penske was fielding the Ilmor-Chevy Indy V-8 engine. Defending Indy 500 winner Al Unser Sr. joined Mears and Sullivan as a third entry for the three 500-mile races (Indianapolis, Michigan, and Pocono).

Back-to-back defending CART champion, and 1986 Indy 500 winner Bobby Rahal returned for what would be his last season at Truesports. The team dropped the Cosworth DFX and they took up the development of the Judd AV engine. The engine was known to be down on horsepower, but excelled in fuel mileage and reliability, particularly in the 500-mile races.

Among the other changes included Al Unser Jr., who left Shierson after a winless 1987 campaign and re-joined the Galles team. Galles was now running the Ilmor-Chevy engine, after running the Brabham-Honda and Buick in previous years. Raul Boesel took Unser's place in the #30 Domino's Pizza entry.

During a tire test session at the Speedway in September 1987, Roberto Guerrero had a crash, and suffered a serious head injury that put him in a coma for seventeen days. After a lengthy recovery, Guerrero was back in the cockpit for 1988. Jim Crawford, who suffered serious leg injuries during time trials in 1987, also returned, signing with King Racing.

Billy Vukovich III, son of Bill Vukovich II, and grandson of two-time winner Bill Vukovich, would become the first third-generation driver in Indy history.

Many of the cars in the field were sporting new style wheels with flush discs, giving the 1988 month of May a unique visual appearance.

After becoming famous for being "first in line" at the Indy 500 from 1950 to 1987, longtime fan Larry Bisceglia of Chicago, and later from Phoenix, fell ill and missed the 1988 race. With failing health, he died December 7, 1988.

=== Rule changes ===
Starting in 1988, teams were allowed to have six crew members over the wall during a pit stop. The crews would consist of four tire changers, a fueler, and a fuel vent/airhose man. Previously they were only allowed five (i.e., three tire changers). This was due in part to the fact that after the series changed from bias-ply tires to radials, the left-front tire (which at the time was seldom changed) would now be changed much more frequently.

For 1988, turbocharger "boost" pressure was reduced from 47 to 45 inHG. Stock-block engines were permitted 55 inHG.

== Race schedule ==
Race schedule — April/May 1988
Sun	Mon	Tue	Wed	Thu	Fri	Sat
24	25	26	27	28	29; ROP	30; ROP
1 ROP	2	3	4	5	6	7 Practice
8 Practice	9 Practice	10; Practice	11; Practice	12; Practice	13; Practice	14; Time Trials
15; Time Trials	16; Practice	17; Practice	18; Practice	19; Practice	20; Practice	21; Time Trials
22; Bump Day	23	24	25	26; Carb Day	27; Mini-Marathon	28; Parade
29; Indy 500	30; Memorial Day	31				

Color	Notes
Green	Practice
Dark Blue	Time trials
Silver	Race day
Red	Rained out*
Blank	No track activity

* Includes days where track
activity was significantly
limited due to rain

ROP — denotes Rookie
Orientation Program

== Practice - Week 1 ==
=== Rookie Orientation ===
Six drivers took part in rookie orientation. John Andretti led the group, putting in 220 laps with a top speed of 201.974 mph. After being denied entry five years ago, Harry Sauce returned to attempt the program once again.

=== Saturday May 7 ===
Opening day saw Raul Boesel first out on the track for Shierson. Dick Simon (211.665 mph) posted the best lap of the day, with less than 15 minutes to go in the session.

=== Sunday May 8 ===
The track closed about two hours early due to rain. Mario Andretti set the best lap of the day (210.970 mph), but did not eclipse Simon's speed from Saturday.

=== Monday May 9 ===
Rick Mears turned the fastest lap of the month thus far at 213.118 mph. Two cars, Teo Fabi in the Porsche entry, and Ludwig Heimrath suffered mechanical/engine-related problems.

=== Tuesday May 10 ===
Rick Mears turned the fastest unofficial practice lap in Indy history, breaking the 220 mph for the first time. His lap of 220.048 mph was just a tick faster than Mario Andretti's lap of 219.995 mph.

Roberto Guerrero was involved in the first crash of the week. He spun in turn one and tapped the outside wall. His car suffered damage to the rear wing. He was not injured.

=== Wednesday May 11 ===
After two days of Mears topping the speed chart, Mario Andretti moved back into the top spot. His lap of 221.565 mph broke the day-old unofficial track record at 5:45 p.m.

=== Thursday May 12 ===
Ludwig Heimrath went high in turn 2 and brushed the outside wall, the second crash of the month. His car whipped around, and hit the wall again. He was not injured, and car had light damage.

Mario Andretti (219.084 mph) led the speed chart, with Scott Brayton second.

=== Friday May 13 ===
The final day of practice was anticipated to be a duel between Rick Mears and Mario Andretti, the two drivers who had distanced themselves from the rest of the field. Mears and Andretti finished the day with identical laps at 221.465 mph to tie at the top of the speed chart. Danny Sullivan came in third-best with a lap of 218.446 mph.

Andretti finished the week of practice with the fastest over speed, set on Wednesday. Mears was second, and the pair went into time trials as the favorites for the pole position.

== Time Trials - First weekend ==
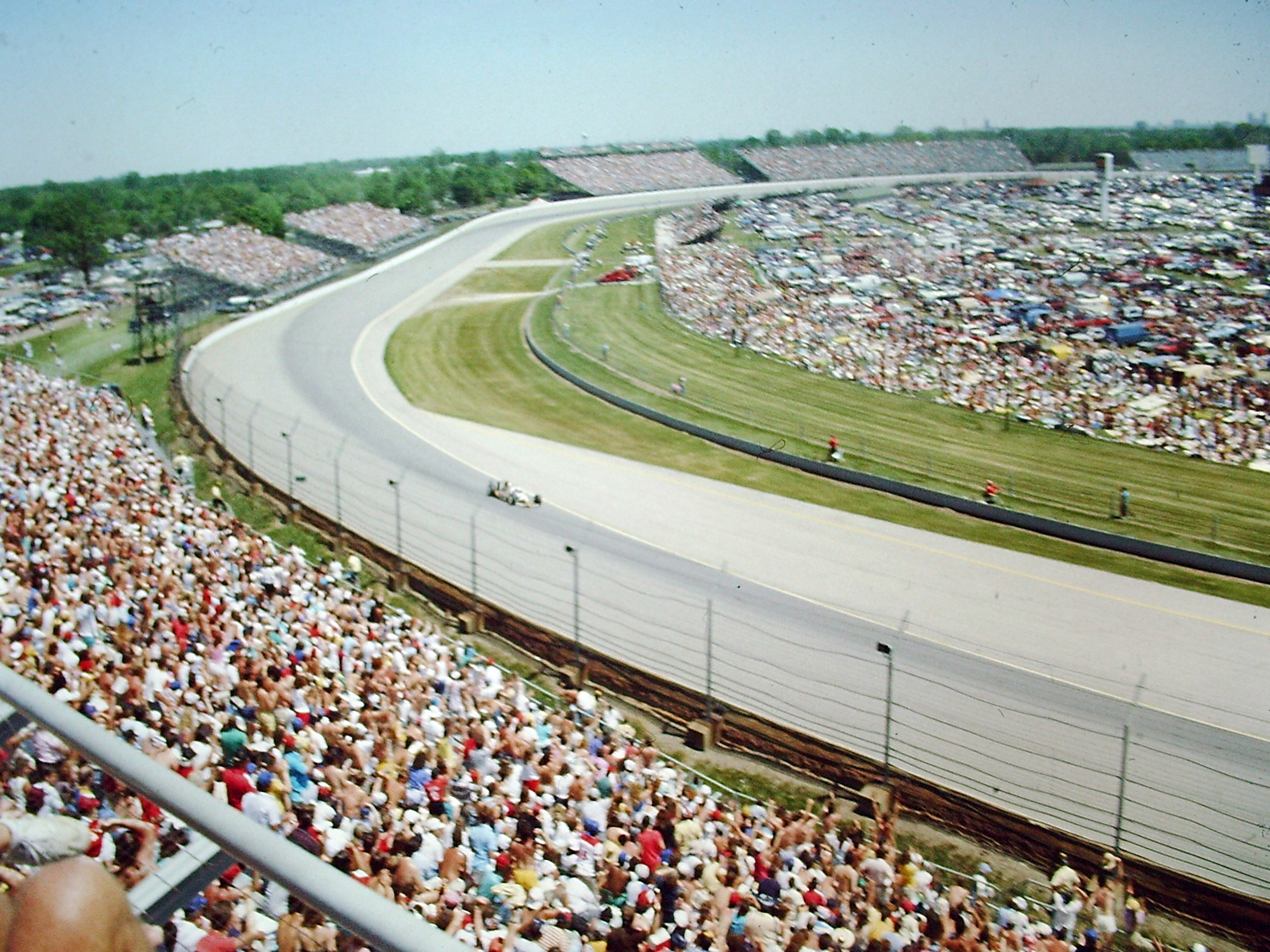
Danny Sullivan makes his time trial run

=== Pole day - Saturday May 14 ===
On pole day morning, Rick Mears blistered the track with a lap of 222.827 mph during the morning practice session. It was a new all-time unofficial track record. Mario Andretti (220.372 mph) was close behind with the second-fastest. Raul Boesel and Tom Bigelow suffered single-car crashes during the session.

Mario Andretti drew the coveted first qualifying attempt. After leading the speed charts in practice much of the week, his qualifying speed was inconsistent and disappointingly slow. His first lap of 217.014 mph was his fastest, but 4 mph slower than he practiced a day earlier. His final lap of 212.761 mph pulled his four-lap average down to 214.692 mph. He claims to have hit a patch of oil-dry in turn four, which was laid down earlier that morning due to Boesel's crash.

At 12:07 p.m., just over an hour into the session, Al Unser Sr. completed his attempt at 215.270 mph, good enough to take over the provisional pole position, and secure a spot on the front row. Derek Daly and Scott Brayton completed runs over 212 mph, and by 1 p.m., the field was filled to ten cars.

At 1:21 p.m., Danny Sullivan took to the track and on his second lap, he set a new one-lap track record of 217.749 mph. His four-lap average fell short of a record, but his speed of 216.214 mph took over the pole position for the moment. Rick Mears, the third of the three Penske cars, took to the track at 1:58 p.m. With Sullivan and Unser tentatively sitting 1st–2nd, the attention focused on Mears and if he could make it an all-Penske front row. His first lap of 220.453 mph was an all-time official track record, and he became the first driver to break the 220 mph barrier at Indy.

- Lap 1 – 40.825 seconds, 220.453 mph (new 1-lap track record)
- Lap 2 – 40.932 seconds, 219.877 mph
- Lap 3 – 41.137 seconds, 218.781 mph
- Lap 4 – 41.341 seconds, 217.702 mph
- Total – 2:44.235, 219.198 mph (new 4-lap track record)

The third and fourth laps dropped off a bit, but Mears still set a record four-lap average of 219.198 mph. Mears won his then-record fourth Indy 500 pole. With Penske cars Mears, Sullivan, and Unser, ranked 1st–2nd–3rd, the team became the first team in Indy history to sweep all three spots on the front row of the starting grid. After Mears' run, the track stayed mostly quiet due to the hot conditions. Several teams pulled out of line and elected to wait until the final hour.

With better conditions at 5 p.m., Arie Luyendyk put his car in the field at just over 213 mph. Al Unser Jr. was the last car with a realistic shot at the front row. Unser Jr. fell short, with a speed of 214.186 mph, good enough for 5th position.

At the end of the day, Bobby Rahal was among those not yet in the field. His first presentation to the line was aborted when the car would not crank. He waved off two attempts, the second attempt was averaging 212.8 mph after three laps. A. J. Foyt went out early, but debris on the track forced him to pull off. His second attempt was too slow, and he waved off. At the end of the day, the field was filled to 19 cars.

=== Second day - Sunday May 15 ===
A hot, 88 degree day kept cars off the track most of the afternoon. Only two cars would complete qualifying attempts, both in the final hour. At about 5:30 p.m., Jim Crawford put his car in the field at 210.564 mph. Bobby Rahal was the other qualifier, with a speed of 208.526 mph, slower than his speeds from Saturday.

At the close of the first weekend of time trials, there were 21 cars in the field. Among those not yet in the field were A. J. Foyt, Raul Boesel, Johnny Rutherford, and rookie John Andretti.

== Practice - Week 2 ==
=== Monday May 16 ===
Rookie Harry Sauce spun in turn one during the final phase of his rookie test. The car was not damaged. Mario Andretti (216.398 mph) was the fastest of the day.

=== Tuesday May 17 ===
Gordon Johncock took to the track for his first shakedown laps of the month. Rookie Dominic Dobson completed his refresher test. Danny Sullivan (214.183 mph), was the fastest of the day.

=== Wednesday May 18 ===
Spike Gehlhausen wrecked hard in turn 1, and was taken to the hospital. X-rays were negative, however he was out for the rest of the month. After struggling getting up to speed, Harry Sauce withdrew. Rookie Dale Coyne also announced he would not attempt to qualify. Pancho Carter (208.574 mph) was the fastest non-qualified driver, while Al Unser Sr. (210.280 mph) was the fastest overall.

=== Thursday May 19 ===
Raul Boesel (213.270 mph) topped the speed chart for the day. Rookie Scott Atchison wrecked in turn 4. he spent the night in the hospital, but was cleared to drive.

=== Friday May 20 ===
The final full day of practice saw Pancho Carter (213.878 mph) and Raul Boesel (213.068 mph) lead the non-qualified drivers. Mario Andretti drove a back-up car to 212.314 mph.

== Time Trials - Second weekend ==
=== Third Day - Saturday May 21 ===
Nine cars completed qualifying runs, filling the field to 30 cars. Raul Boesel (211.058 mph) was the fastest of the day, with Dominic Dobson (210.096 mph) second fastest, and the fastest rookie. A. J. Foyt secured a starting position in his record 31st consecutive Indy 500.

Pancho Carter crashed twice during the day. On his final qualifying lap, he brushed the wall in the final turn, and slid and spun down the mainstretch. Later in the day, he wrecked his backup car in turn 2 during a practice run. He was uninjured.

Billy Vukovich III, grandson of two-time winner Bill Vukovich, and son of race veteran Bill Vukovich II qualified with a solid run in the final hour. He became the first third-generation driver in Indy 500 history. As time expired, Steve Chassey made his third and final attempt, which was good enough to make the field.

=== Bump Day - Sunday May 22 ===
The final day of time trials opened with three positions left unfilled. Johnny Rutherford was the first car to make an attempt, and qualified comfortably at 208.442 mph. Later, Howdy Holmes and Stan Fox (driving Foyt backup car) filled the field to 33 cars. Scott Atchison (205.142 mph) was the first car on the bubble.

Atchison survived three attempts, but Ludwig Heimrath finally bumped him out at 3:45 p.m. The move put Rich Vogler (206.463 mph) on the bubble. Ed Pimm made an attempt but wrecked, and Gordon Johncock waved off after a lap of only 206.049 mph. Vogler waited, and the team wheeled out a back-up car just in case.

After crashing twice on Saturday, Pancho Carter's team purchased a back-up car from Hemelgarn Racing, but with practice time running out, they were having difficulty getting the car up to speed. Meanwhile, A. J. Foyt rolled another backup car out of the garage area. George Snider decided he did not want to qualify the car, and Foyt quickly consummated a deal with Johnny Parsons. Foyt shook the car down, and Parsons took it out for a practice run. At 5:29 p.m., he went high and smacked the wall in the northchute, ending his chances to qualify.

At 5:43 p.m., Gordon Johncock made his third and final attempt, this time bumping Vogler. However, Johncock himself was now on the bubble (206.693 mph) with less than ten minutes renaming. Rich Vogler quickly climbed into his backup car, and as time expired, bumped his way back into the field with a speed of 207.126 mph. Johncock was out, and Pancho Carter was left waiting in line.

== Carburetion Day ==
A total of 31 of the 33 qualified cars took to the track for the final practice session on Thursday May 26. Two of the alternates took laps, for a total of 33 cars on the track. A few cars experienced minor mechanical problems, but there were no accidents. Mario Andretti (215.105 mph) was the fastest car of the day. Penske teammates Danny Sullivan and pole-sitter Rick Mears were second and third.

The day before the race, Al Unser Jr. reportedly came down with a stomach flu or possibly food poisoning. However, he rested and planned to drive on race day.

=== Pit Stop Contest ===
The semifinals and finals for the 12th annual Miller Pit Stop Contest were held on Thursday May 26. The top three race qualifiers and their respective pit crews were automatically eligible: Rick Mears, Danny Sullivan, Al Unser Sr., all of the Penske team. However, both Mears and Unser declined their invitations. Sullivan (whose car was sponsored by Miller), was the only Penske car to accept the invitation; he pitted with an "all-star" crew from Penske Racing. Mario Andretti and Al Unser Jr. (who qualified 4th and 5th for the race, respectively) filled those two spots. Roberto Guerrero secured the fourth and final spot in the contest during preliminaries which were on held on Thursday May 19. Guerrero (13.791 seconds) advanced ahead of Derek Daly and Dick Simon.

In the final round, Danny Sullivan of Penske and led by chief mechanic Chuck Sprague, faced Mario Andretti of Newman/Haas Racing, led by chief mechanic Colin Duff. Sullivan beat Andretti, however, Sullivan was penalized five seconds for having a tire changer jump over the wall too soon. Andretti was penalized for using the wrong spec tire. After a lengthy discussion and debate with officials, both teams agreed to re-run the final round from scratch. Sullivan prevailed, notching his third win in the Pit Stop Contest, and Penske Racing's sixth overall.

Semifinals
9	Danny Sullivan (Penske Racing)	15.279
2	Roberto Guerrero (Vince Granatelli Racing)	15.387
6	Mario Andretti (Newman/Haas Racing)	15.654
3	Al Unser Jr. (Galles Racing)	20.127

Finals
9	Danny Sullivan (Penske Racing)	14.782
6	Mario Andretti (Newman/Haas Racing)	15.006

== Starting grid ==
Row	Inside		Middle		Outside	
1	5	(United States) Rick Mears W Pennzoil Z-7; Penske Racing; Penske PC-17, Chevrolet 265; 219.198 mph (352.765 km/h)	9	(United States) Danny Sullivan W Miller High Life; Penske Racing; Penske PC-17, Chevrolet 265; 216.214 mph (347.963 km/h)	1	(United States) Al Unser W Hertz; Penske Racing; Penske PC-17, Chevrolet 265; 215.27 mph (346.44 km/h)
2	6	(United States) Mario Andretti W Amoco/Kmart; Newman/Haas Racing; Lola T8800, Chevrolet 265; 214.692 mph (345.513 km/h)	3	(United States) Al Unser Jr. Valvoline/Stroh's; Galles Racing; March 88C, Chevrolet 265; 214.186 mph (344.699 km/h)	7	(Netherlands) Arie Luyendyk; Provimi Veal; Dick Simon Racing; Lola T8800, Cosworth DFX; 213.611 mph (343.774 km/h)
3	91	(United States) Scott Brayton; Amway Products; Hemelgarn Racing; Lola T8800, Buick V-6; 212.624 mph (342.185 km/h)	20	(Brazil) Emerson Fittipaldi; Marlboro; Patrick Racing; March 88C, Chevrolet 265; 212.512 mph (342.005 km/h)	10	(Republic of Ireland) Derek Daly; Raynor Garage Door; Raynor Racing; Lola T8800, Cosworth DFX; 212.295 mph (341.656 km/h)
4	18	(United States) Michael Andretti; Kraco Stereo; Kraco Racing; March 88C, Cosworth DFX; 207.591 mph (334.085 km/h)	24	(United States) Randy Lewis; Toshiba/Oracle; Leader Card Racing; Lola T8800, Cosworth DFX; 209.774 mph (337.599 km/h)	2	(Colombia) Roberto Guerrero; STP/Dianetics; Vince Granatelli Racing; Lola T8800, Cosworth DFX; 209.633 mph (337.372 km/h)
5	11	(United States) Kevin Cogan; Schaefer/Playboy Fashion; Machinists Union Racing; March 88C, Cosworth DFX; 209.552 mph (337.241 km/h)	81	(United States) Tom Sneva W Pizza Hut/WRTV-6; Hemelgarn Racing; Lola T8800, Judd; 208.659 mph (335.804 km/h)	9	(United States) Phil Kruegar; CNC Systems; Gohr Racing; March 86C, Cosworth DFX; 208.212 mph (335.085 km/h)
6	22	(United States) Dick Simon; Uniden/Soundesign; Dick Simon Racing; Lola T88000, Chevrolet 265; 207.555 mph (334.027 km/h)	8	(Italy) Teo Fabi; Quaker State; Porsche; March 88C, Porsche North America; 207.244 mph (333.527 km/h)	15	(United Kingdom) Jim Crawford; Mac Tools; Bernstein Racing; Lola T8700, Buick V-6; 210.564 mph (338.870 km/h)
7	4	(United States) Bobby Rahal W Budweiser; Truesports; Lola T8800, Judd; 208.526 mph (335.590 km/h)	30	(Brazil) Raul Boesel; Domino's Pizza; Doug Shierson Racing; March 88C, Cosworth DFX; 211.058 mph (339.665 km/h)	92	(United States) Dominic Dobson R Moore Industries; Dobson Motorsports; Lola T8700, Cosworth DFX; 210.096 mph (338.117 km/h)
8	14	(United States) A. J. Foyt W Copenhagen/Gilmore; A. J. Foyt Enterprises; Lola T8800, Cosworth DFX; 209.696 mph (337.473 km/h)	56	(United States) Bill Vukovich III R Genesee Beer Wagon; Gohr Racing; March 88C, Cosworth DFX; 208.545 mph (335.621 km/h)	16	(United States) Tony Bettenhausen Jr. Scot Lad Foods; Bettenhausen Motorsports; Lola T8700, Cosworth DFX; 208.342 mph (335.294 km/h)
9	23	(Finland) Tero Palmroth R Neste/Editor; Dick Simon Racing; Lola T8800, Cosworth DFX; 208.001 mph (334.745 km/h)	35	(United States) Steve Chassey; Gary Trout Motorsports; Gary Trout Motorsports; March 87C, Cosworth DFX; 207.951 mph (334.665 km/h)	98	(United States) John Andretti R Skoal Bandit; Curb Racing; Lola T8800, Cosworth DFX; 207.894 mph (334.573 km/h)
10	48	(United States) Rocky Moran R Greer; A. J. Foyt Enterprises; March 86C, Chevy V6; 207.181 mph (333.425 km/h)	84	(United States) Stan Fox; Calumet Farms; A. J. Foyt Enterprises; March 86C, Chevy V6; 208.578 mph (335.674 km/h)	17	(United States) Johnny Rutherford W Mac Tools; Bernstein Racing; Lola T8700, Buick V-6; 208.442 mph (335.455 km/h)
11	71	(Canada) Ludwig Heimrath Jr, Mackenzie Financial; Hemelgarn Racing; Lola T8800, Cosworth DFX; 207.215 mph (333.480 km/h)	29	(United States) Rich Vogler; Byrd/Pepsi/Bryant Heating; Machinists Union Racing; March 87C, Cosworth DFX; 207.126 mph (333.337 km/h)	33	(United States) Howdy Holmes; Jiffy Mix; Alex Morales Motorsports; March 88C, Cosworth DFX; 206.97 mph (333.09 km/h)

=== Alternates ===
- First alternate: Gordon Johncock W (#60) - Bumped
- Second alternate: Rich Vogler (#27T) - Back up car
- Third alternate: Scott Atchison R (#55) - Bumped

=== Failed to Qualify ===
- Gary Bettenhausen (#46) - Waved off, too slow
- John Jones (#12) - Waved off, too slow
- Pancho Carter (#28) - Waved off, too slow
- Johnny Parsons (#36) - Incomplete run
- Ed Pimm (#27) - Wrecked during qualifying
- Tom Bigelow (#77) - Practiced, but did not attempt to qualify
- Dick Ferguson (#27)- Car taken over by Pimm
- George Snider (#84) - Practiced, but did not attempt to qualify
- Spike Gehlhausen (#87) - Practice crash, injured
- Harry Sauce R (#36) - Withdrew
- Dale Coyne R (#39) - Withdrew

R = Indianapolis 500 rookie
W = Former Indianapolis 500 winner

== Race summary ==
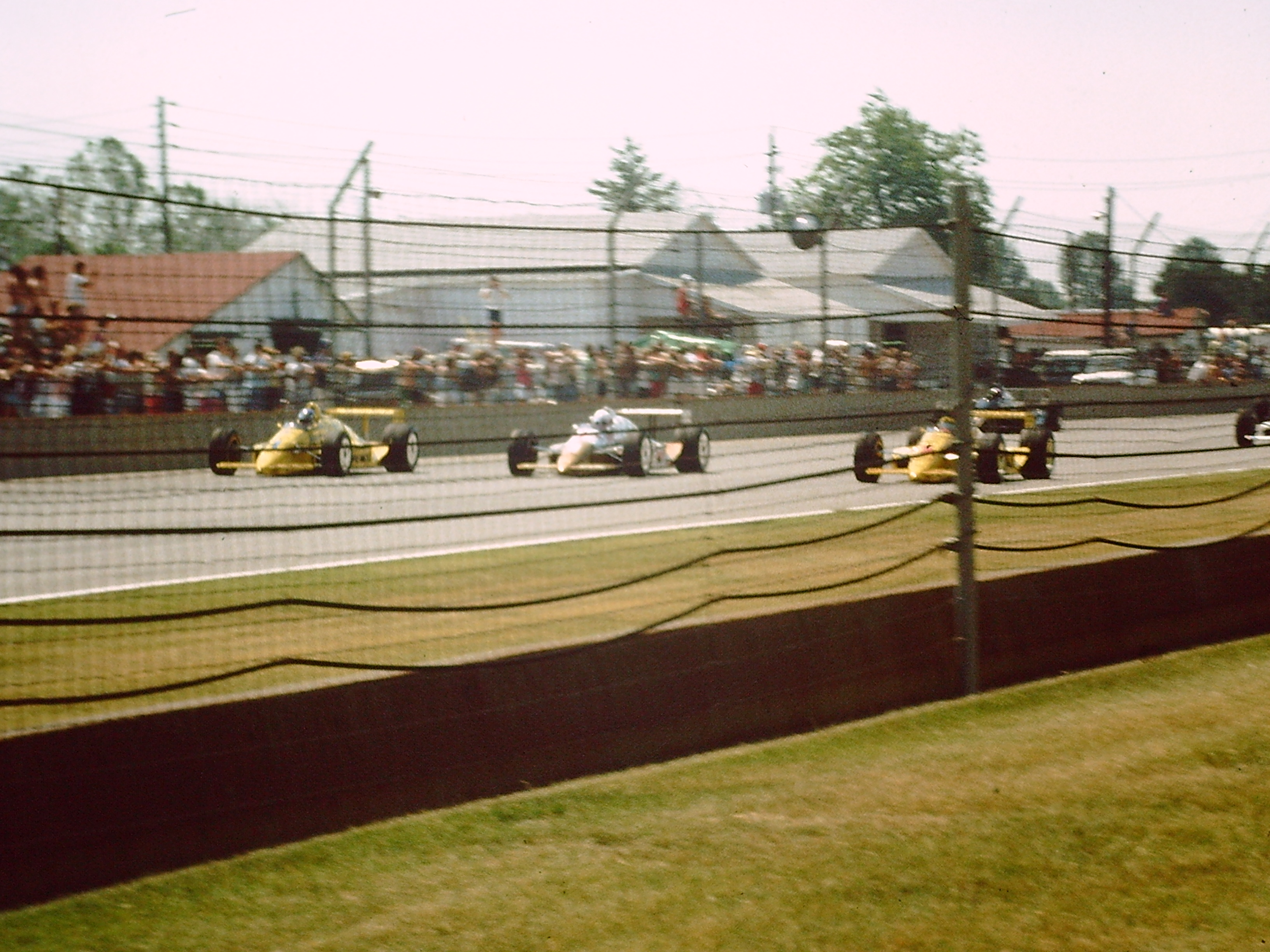
The front row during the pace lap. From left to right: Al Unser Sr. (outside), Danny Sullivan (middle), Rick Mears (pole position)

=== Start ===
Danny Sullivan darted into the lead at the green flag, with Rick Mears in second. In turn two, Scott Brayton spun, collecting Roberto Guerrero, and both cars crashed into the outside wall. Tony Bettenhausen Jr., behind the incident, also crashed. On lap 6, the green flag came back out. Danny Sullivan got the jump on the start, and pulled out to a comfortable lead.

The top five would be Sullivan, Rick Mears, Al Unser Sr., Al Unser Jr., and Mario Andretti.

=== First half ===
During the first sequence of pit stops, Tom Sneva crashed coming out of turn four on lap 34. Under the yellow, Teo Fabi, using the Porsche engine, pulled out of his pit stall with one of the rear wheels not secured. The wheel came off, and the car bottomed out, creating a terminal oil leak. Danny Sullivan continued to dominate in the lead, with Rick Mears falling to 10th place with handling problems. Al Unser Sr. and Al Unser Jr. continued to hold on to the top five, with Arie Luyendyk also lurking. Jim Crawford also began working his way into the top ten.

Three additional single-car crashes occurred prior to the halfway point. A. J. Foyt wrecked coming out of turn two on lap 58, due to handling problems and slick conditions. On the ensuing restart on lap 64, Arie Luyendyk tagged Ludwig Heimrath Jr., sending Heimrath spinning and crashing out of turn four. Steve Chassey crashed in turn 4 on lap 81, suffering a concussion.

Both Mario Andretti (gearbox) and Al Unser Jr. (CV joint) came to the pits for long repairs. Both cars re-entered the race several laps down.

After suffering early handling issues, Rick Mears radioed his crew and requested that they switch to the old style wheels. The car was not handling well with the new style flush disc wheels. The crew had to scramble back to the transporter to collect sets of older style wheels, and have all the tires re-mounted back in the garage area.

On lap 93, the caution came out for debris on the track. Rick Mears had just un-lapped himself, and got back on to the lead lap. Leader Danny Sullivan pitted, giving the lead for the first time to Jim Crawford in the Buick-powered machine. Crawford blistered the track for the next several laps, with a noticeably drastic racing line, dipping deep below the white line, and aggressive dicing through traffic.

=== Second half ===
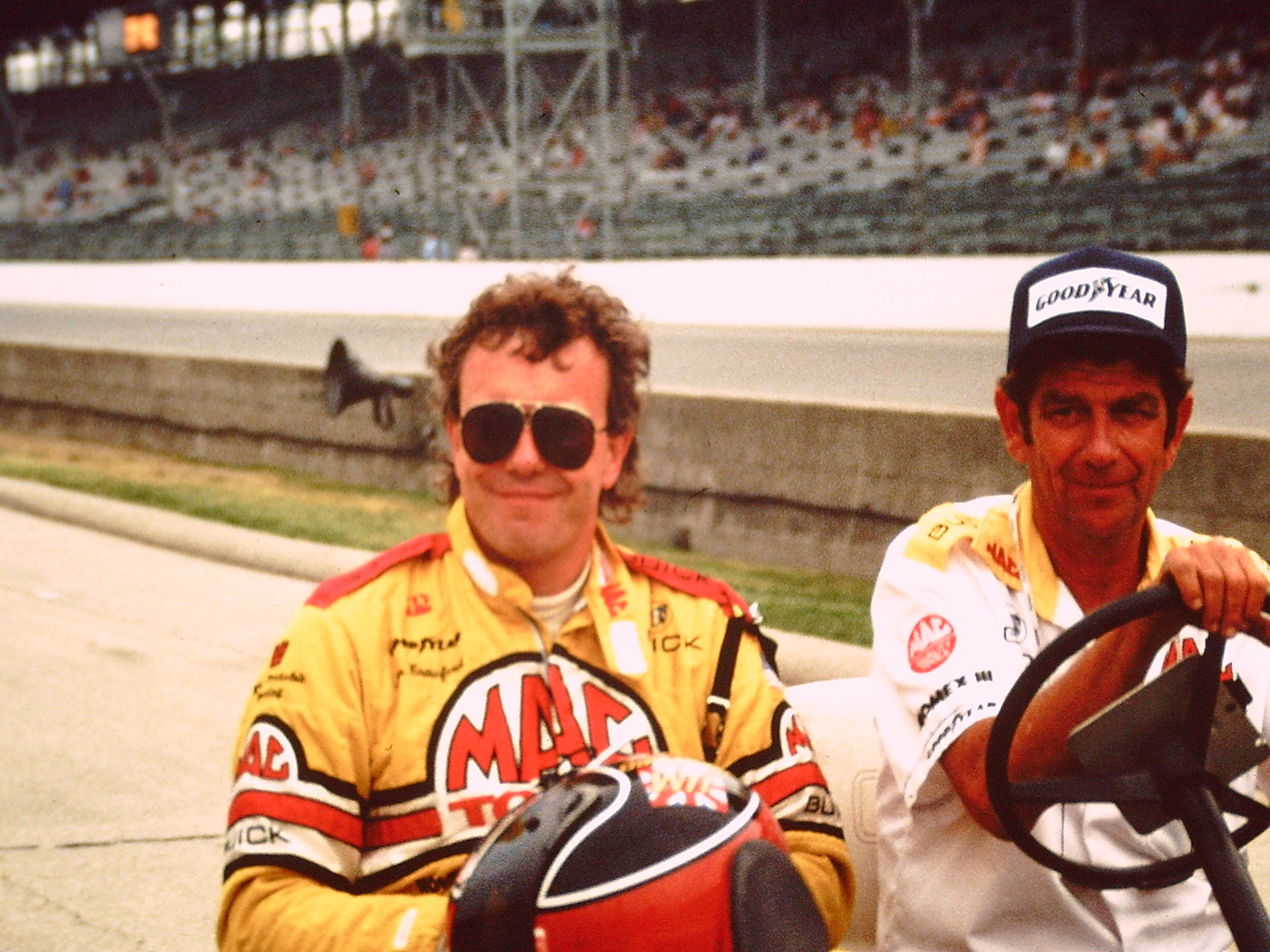
Jim Crawford led 8 laps.

At lap 100, Jim Crawford led, with Rick Mears finally back up to second, Al Unser Sr. third. Danny Sullivan had slipped back to fourth. On lap 102, Sullivan's front wing adjusters broke, sending his car up into the outside wall in turn one. After leading 92 laps, Sullivan was out, but Penske teammates Rick Mears and Al Unser Sr. were now in control.

Crawford's turn at the front totaled eight laps, which would be the only laps not led by the Penske team. After a caution for debris (Unser ran over a rabbit), Rick Mears took the lead on lap 113.

Johnny Rutherford crashed in turn one, similar to Sullivan's crash. At age 50, it would be Rutherford's final lap in Indy 500 competition (he would fail to qualify in subsequent years and officially retired in 1994). After trading positions, Rick Mears took over the lead for good on lap 129.

With Mears pulling away, the rest of the top three was being battled out amongst Al Unser Sr. and Jim Crawford. Emerson Fittipaldi worked his way up to the top five, as did Bobby Rahal with the Judd.

After several long pit stops to repair gearbox problems, an oil leak, and electrical gremlins, Mario Andretti finally called it quits. With the leaders nearing lap 170, Mario was about 50 laps down with a dead engine. Mario was credited with 118 laps in 20th place.

=== Finish ===
With Rick Mears seemingly in control, the only battle that remained was for second place. Emerson Fittipaldi was running second, but he was deep in traffic. In the final twenty laps, USAC officials were contemplating issuing a two-lap penalty to Fittipaldi for allegedly passing a car under the yellow while exiting the pits on lap 164. Indecisive, USAC officials first penalized Fittipaldi, retracted the penalty, then re-instated it over a matter of minutes. This infuriated Fittipaldi and car owner Pat Patrick, who threatened to file a protest once the race was over. Fittipaldi was dropped to 7th place, two laps down. The resulting scoring adjustments elevated Jim Crawford to second place, and Al Unser Sr. into third.

On lap 194, Jim Crawford got sideways in turn three, which flat-spotted his tires. He ducked into the pit area to change tires, but the crew had difficulty changing them, and he lost several seconds. He dropped back to 6th on the track. Suddenly Penske teammates Rick Mears and Al Unser Sr. were running 1st-2nd. Moments later, on lap 197 a piece of bodywork flew off of Michael Andretti's car. The yellow came out, and the safety crews rushed out to fetch the debris. However, the caution was extended when another piece of debris fell off one of the safety trucks. They were unable to clear the track before the white flag was displayed for the final lap. The race finished under caution with Rick Mears winning his third Indy 500. Some confusion hovered over the placement of other cars, but for the moment, Al Unser Sr. was second, Michael Andretti third, and Bobby Rahal worked all the way up to 4th in the Judd-powered entry.

=== Post-race ===
After the race, during the post-race scoring evaluation, Patrick Racing was prepared to protest Emerson Fittipaldi's two-lap penalty. USAC claimed that while exiting the pits, Fittipaldi passed the lapped car of Rich Vogler, and did not properly honor the blend-in rule. Fittipaldi claimed that Vogler waved him by as they exited turn two to the backstretch. When Vogler got word of Fittipaldi's penalty, he immediately rushed to the USAC officials and corroborated Fittipaldi's account. Vogler claimed that he was 8–10 laps down at the time and purposely waved Fittipaldi by, and that the penalty was "unjust". Under the rules at the time, slower cars that were a lap or more down were permitted to wave other faster cars by during caution periods. It was a move primarily used by backmarkers in order not to impede the leaders on the ensuring restart.

USAC re-evaluated the situation, and when official results were posted Monday morning, they retracted Fittipaldi's penalty once and for all. Fittipaldi's laps were reinstated, which elevated him to a second-place finish. Al Unser Sr. was officially third, denying Penske Racing of their first 1st–2nd Indy sweep. Jim Crawford's exciting day finished with a 6th place, the Buick V-6's best finish to-date.

One year after his best ever finish in the Indianapolis 500, Dick Simon raced from 16th starting spot to finish 9th in his final "500" as a driver. During the season finale weekend in Miami, Simon would announce his retirement from driving to concentrate running his race team.

== Box score ==
Finish	Start	No	Name	Team	Chassis	Engine	Qual	Laps	Status
1	1	5	(United States) Rick Mears W	Penske Racing	Penske PC-17	Ilmor-Chevrolet	219.198	200	144.809 mph
2	8	20	(Brazil) Emerson Fittipaldi	Patrick Racing	March 88C	Ilmor-Chevrolet	212.512	200	+7.072 seconds
3	3	1	(United States) Al Unser Sr. W	Penske Racing	Penske PC-17	Ilmor-Chevrolet	215.270	199	-1 Lap
4	10	18	(United States) Michael Andretti	Kraco Racing	March 88C	Cosworth DFX	210.183	199	-1 Lap
5	19	4	(United States) Bobby Rahal W	Truesports	Lola T88/00	Judd AV	208.526	199	-1 Lap
6	18	15	(United Kingdom) Jim Crawford	King Racing	Lola T87/00	Buick V-6	210.564	198	-2 Laps
7	20	30	(Brazil) Raul Boesel	Doug Shierson Racing	March 88C	Cosworth DFX	211.058	198	-2 Laps
8	15	97	(United States) Phil Krueger	R Kent Baker Racing	March 86C	Cosworth DFX	208.212	196	-4 Laps
9	16	22	(United States) Dick Simon	Dick Simon Racing	Lola T88/00	Cosworth DFX	207.555	196	-4 Laps
10	6	7	(Netherlands) Arie Luyendyk	Dick Simon Racing	Lola T88/00	Cosworth DFX	213.611	196	-4 Laps
11	13	11	(United States) Kevin Cogan	Machinists Union Racing	March 88C	Cosworth DFX	209.552	195	-5 Laps
12	33	21	(United States) Howdy Holmes	Alex Morales Motorsports	March 88C	Cosworth DFX	206.970	192	-8 Laps
13	5	3	(United States) Al Unser Jr.	Galles Racing	March 88C	Ilmor-Chevrolet	214.186	180	-20 Laps
14	23	56	(United States) Billy Vukovich III R	Gohr Racing	March 88C	Cosworth DFX	208.545	179	-21 Laps
15	11	24	(United States) Randy Lewis	Leader Card Racers	Lola T88/00	Cosworth DFX	209.774	175	-25 Laps
16	28	48	(United States) Rocky Moran R	A. J. Foyt Enterprises	March 86C	Cosworth DFX	207.181	159	Engine
17	32	29	(United States) Rich Vogler	Machinists Union Racing	March 87C	Cosworth DFX	207.126	159	Crash T3
18	21	92	(United States) Dominic Dobson R	Dobson Motorsports	Lola T87/00	Cosworth DFX	210.096	145	Lost Coolant
19	25	23	(Finland) Tero Palmroth R	Dick Simon Racing	Lola T88/00	Cosworth DFX	208.001	144	Engine
20	4	6	(United States) Mario Andretti W	Newman/Haas Racing	Lola T88/00	Ilmor-Chevrolet	214.692	118	Electrical
21	27	98	(United States) John Andretti R	Mike Curb Racing	Lola T88/00	Cosworth DFX	207.894	114	Engine
22	30	17	(United States) Johnny Rutherford W	King Racing	Lola T87/00	Buick V-6	208.442	107	Crash T1
23	2	9	(United States) Danny Sullivan W	Penske Racing	Penske PC-17	Ilmor-Chevrolet	216.214	101	Crash T1
24	26	35	(United States) Steve Chassey	Gary Trout Motorsports	March 87C	Cosworth DFX	207.951	73	Crash T4
25	31	71	(Canada) Ludwig Heimrath	Hemelgarn Racing	Lola T88/00	Cosworth DFX	207.214	59	Crash T4
26	22	14	(United States) A. J. Foyt W	A. J. Foyt Enterprises	Lola T88/00	Cosworth DFX	209.696	54	Crash BS
27	14	81	(United States) Tom Sneva W	Hemelgarn Racing	Lola T88/00	Judd	208.659	32	Crash T4
28	17	8	(Italy) Teo Fabi	Porsche Motorsports	March 88C	Porsche	207.244	30	Accident Pits
29	9	10	(Republic of Ireland) Derek Daly	Raynor Motorsports	Lola T88/00	Cosworth DFX	212.295	18	Gearbox
30	29	84	(United States) Stan Fox	A. J. Foyt Enterprises	March 86C	Chevy V-6	208.579	2	Half Shaft
31	7	91	(United States) Scott Brayton	Hemelgarn Racing	Lola T88/00	Buick V-6	212.624	0	Crash T2
32	12	2	(Colombia) Roberto Guerrero	Vince Granatelli Racing	Lola T88/00	Cosworth DFX	209.632	0	Crash T2
33	24	16	(United States) Tony Bettenhausen Jr.	Bettenhausen Motorsports	Lola T87/00	Cosworth DFX	208.342	0	Crash T2

W Former Indianapolis 500 winner

R Indianapolis 500 Rookie

All cars utilized Goodyear tires.

=== Race statistics ===
Lap Leaders
Laps	Leader
1–30	Danny Sullivan
31–33	Al Unser Sr.
34–94	Danny Sullivan
95–101	Jim Crawford
102–103	Rick Mears
104	Jim Crawford
105–112	Al Unser Sr.
113–121	Rick Mears
122	Al Unser Sr.
123–200	Rick Mears

Total Laps Led
Driver	Laps
Danny Sullivan	91
Rick Mears	89
Al Unser Sr.	12
Jim Crawford	8

Cautions: 14 for 68 laps
Laps	Reason
1–5	Brayton, Guerrero, Bettenhausen crash in turn 2
34–39	Tom Sneva crash in turn 4
58–63	A. J. Foyt crash in turn 2
64–70	Ludwig Heimrath crash in turn 4
82–88	Steve Chassey crash in turn 4
93–95	Debris
102–106	Danny Sullivan crash in turn 1
109–111	Debris; Al Unser Sr. hit rabbit
117–120	Johnny Rutherford crash in turn 1
140–145	Mario Andretti stalled on track
160–163	Tero Palmroth stalled on track
167–170	Rocky Moran blown engine
175–179	Rich Vogler crash in turn 3
198–200	Debris; Michael Andretti lost bodywork

== Broadcasting ==
=== Radio ===
The race was carried live on the IMS Radio Network. In September 1987, Paul Page left NBC Sports and joined ABC. As a result, Page left the IMS Radio Network, and vacated his position as Voice of the 500. Veteran personality Lou Palmer, who debuted with the network in 1958, was elevated to the chief announcer position for 1988.

Outside of Page's departure, a few changes were made to the crew for 1988. Pancho Carter, who failed to qualify for the race, served as "driver expert". Bob Lamey debuted on the crew, taking the Turn 2 location on top of the VIP Suites. Howdy Bell, who was previously in that spot, moved to the pit area and shared the north pits with Chuck Marlowe. Luke Walton covered the starting command during the pre-race, but did not have a role during the race itself.

After the race, with Palmer now in the booth, Bob Forbes conducted the victory lane winner's interview. Sally Larvick (Paul Page's wife), who had worked on the crew from 1982 to 1987 in only a limited role (conducting interviews with celebrities, etc.), elevated to a full pit reporter starting in 1988.

This would also be the final 500 for statistician John DeCamp as the position would be eliminated for 1989. DeCamp also known as the voice of Purdue University football and basketball would pass away in 2003.

Indianapolis Motor Speedway Radio Network
Booth Announcers	Turn Reporters	Pit/garage reporters
Chief Announcer: Lou Palmer; Driver expert: Pancho Carter; Statistician: John DeCamp; Historian: Donald Davidson	Turn 1: Jerry Baker; Turn 2: Bob Lamey R Turn 3: Larry Henry; Turn 4: Bob Jenkins	Luke Walton (pre-race); Bob Forbes (garages)
Chief Announcer: Lou Palmer; Driver expert: Pancho Carter; Statistician: John DeCamp; Historian: Donald Davidson	Turn 1: Jerry Baker; Turn 2: Bob Lamey R Turn 3: Larry Henry; Turn 4: Bob Jenkins	Howdy Bell (north pits); Chuck Marlowe (north pits); Sally Larvick (center pits); Ron Carrell (south/center pits); Gary Gerould (south pits)

=== Television ===
The race was carried live flag-to-flag coverage in the United States on ABC Sports. Major changes were ushered in for 1988. Don Ohlmeyer was brought in as one of the directors, and a new style of the broadcast reflected Ohlmeyer's influence. The opening tease featured Alan Silvestri's score from the film The Delta Force, in a medley with the instrumental song "Katydid's Ditty" by Mason Williams. The Delta Force intros (known as the "Page Teases"), narrated by Paul Page, would become a popular fixture of the ABC telecasts of the Indy 500, Brickyard 400, and other Indycar races, through 1998 and reprised again in 2001.

With Jim McKay departed, Paul Page served as both host and play-by-play announcer. Bobby Unser and Sam Posey returned as color commentators, and this three-man booth crew would cover the Indy 500 and other Indycar races on ABC through 1995.

Jack Arute and Brian Hammons served as pit reporters, the only time a crew of only two men covered the pits since going to a live broadcast.

New RaceCam angles debuted for 1988. Along with the "over-the-shoulder" camera, there were also cameras facing backwards from the cars, as well as a cockpit camera looking up at the driver.

ABC Television
Booth Announcers	Pit/garage reporters
Host/Announcer: Paul Page; Color: Sam Posey; Color: Bobby Unser	Jack Arute; Brian Hammons

== 1987–88 USAC Gold Crown Championship ==
1987–88 USAC Championship Car season
- USAC Gold Crown Championship

Season
- Races: 1

Awards
- National champion: (United States) Rick Mears

The 1987–88 USAC Gold Crown Championship season consisted of one sanctioned race. The schedule was based on a split-calendar, beginning in June 1987 and running through May 1988. Starting in 1981, USAC scaled back their participation in top-level Indy car racing, and ultimately ceased sanctioning races outside of the Indianapolis 500 following their 1983–84 season. Subsequently, the Gold Crown Championship would consist of only one event annually; the winner of the Indianapolis 500 would be the de facto Gold Crown champion, as it was their lone points-paying event. The preeminent national championship season was instead sanctioned by CART, and the Indy 500 paid championship points separately (on a different scale) toward the CART championship as well.

Rick Mears, by virtue of winning the 1988 Indianapolis 500, also won the 1987–88 USAC Championship.

=== Final points standings (Top five) ===
Pos	Driver	INDY (United States)	Pts
1	(United States) Rick Mears	1	1000
2	(Brazil) Emerson Fittipaldi	2	800
3	(United States) Al Unser Sr.	3	700
4	(United States) Michael Andretti	4	600
5	(United States) Bobby Rahal	5	500

== Selected rules and specifications ==
Engine regulations
Engine Type	Maximum Displacement	Turbocharger Boost
Turbocharged DOHC V-8	161.7 cu in (2.65 L)	45 inHg (1,500 mbar)
Turbocharged Stock Block V-6	209.3 cu in (3.43 L)	55 inHg (1,900 mbar)
Normally aspriated OHC	274.6 cu in (4.50 L)	—
Normally aspriated Stock Block	355.1 cu in (5.82 L)	—
Fuel	On-board capacity	Total allotment
Methanol	40 US gal (151.4 L)	280 US gal (1,100 L)

Rookie Test
Phase	Laps	Speed bracket
1	10	180–185 mph
2	10	185–190 mph
3*	10	190–195 mph
4*	10	195–200 mph

*Veteran Refresher tests consisted of Phases 3–4 of the rookie test.

== Notes ==
=== Works cited ===
- 1988 Indianapolis 500 Day-By-Day Trackside Report For the Media
- Indianapolis 500 History: Race & All-Time Stats - Official Site
- 1988 Indianapolis 500 Radio Broadcast, Indianapolis Motor Speedway Radio Network

1987 Indianapolis 500; Al Unser	1988 Indianapolis 500; Rick Mears	1989 Indianapolis 500; Emerson Fittipaldi
