= Ilmor-Chevrolet 265-A engine =

Ilmor-Chevrolet 265-A Ilmor-Chevrolet 265-B Ilmor-Chevrolet 265-C
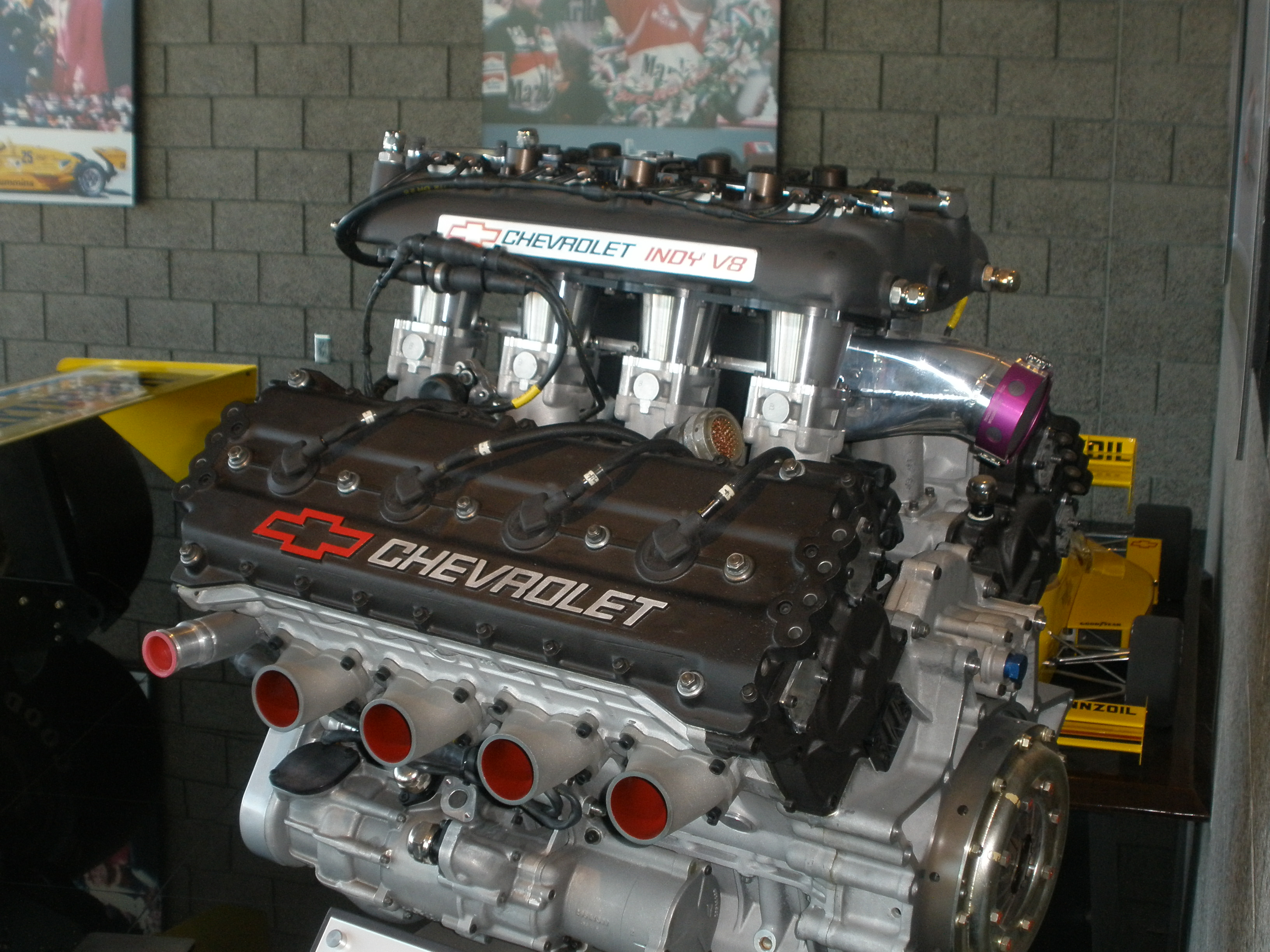

Overview
- Manufacturer: Ilmor
- Production: 1986–1993

Layout
- Configuration: 80°–90° V8
- Displacement: 2.65 L (162 cu in)
- Cylinder bore: 3.465 in (88.0 mm)
- Piston stroke: 2.142 in (54.4 mm)
- Valvetrain: 32-valve, DOHC, four-valves per cylinder
- Compression ratio: 11:1

Combustion
- Turbocharger: Holset
- Fuel system: Mechanical multi-point fuel injection
- Fuel type: Methanol
- Oil system: Dry sump

Output
- Power output: 720–850 hp (537–634 kW)
- Torque output: 350–510 lb⋅ft (475–691 N⋅m)

Chronology
- Successor: Ilmor Mercedes-Benz 265-D (1994)

The Ilmor 265-A is a turbocharged, 2.65 L (162 cu in), V8 Indy car racing engine, designed and developed by Ilmor, for use in the CART PPG Indy Car World Series; between 1986 and 1993.

== History ==
Mario Illien and Paul Morgan were working at Cosworth on the Cosworth DFX turbocharged methanol engine for the CART Indy Car Series; differences of opinion over the direction in which DFX development should go (Cosworth were inherently conservative as they had a near monopoly) led them to break away from their parent company to pursue their own ideas. There was some acrimony in their split from Cosworth, their former employer claiming that the Ilmor engine was little different from their planned modifications to the DFX.

=== 1986 ===
Founded as an independent British engine manufacturer in 1983, Ilmor started building engines for Indy cars with financial backing from team owner and chassis manufacturer Roger Penske. The Ilmor 265-A, badged initially as the Ilmor-Chevy Indy V8, debuted in 1986. The engine was used part-time by Penske team drivers, with Al Unser Sr. racing it at the 1986 Indianapolis 500. Mears notched two poles and two 3rd place finishes with the engine late in the season.

=== 1987–1991 ===
In 1987, the 265-A engine program expanded to full time at Penske Racing. Penske's primary drivers Rick Mears and Danny Sullivan raced it full-time. A third car was entered at Indianapolis for Danny Ongais. However, Ongais was injured in a crash during practice. He was replaced by Al Unser Sr. (who instead fielded a Cosworth). The 265-A was also fielded by Newman/Haas Racing (Mario Andretti) and at Patrick Racing (Emerson Fittipaldi and Kevin Cogan). Andretti won at Long Beach, the engine's first Indy car victory. He also won the pole position for the 1987 Indianapolis 500.

With the 265-A engine now badged as the Chevrolet Indy V8, Rick Mears won the 1988 Indianapolis 500, the engine's first win at Indianapolis. The engine went on to have a stellar record in CART. From 1987 to 1991, the "Chevy-A" engine won 64 of 78 races including the Indy 500 from 1988 to 1991.

=== 1992 ===
In 1992, the 265-B engine was introduced. The "Chevy-B" was fielded singly by Penske Racing (Rick Mears and Emerson Fittipaldi) in 1992 and won four CART series races. All other Ilmor teams remained with the venerable 265-A for 1992. Bobby Rahal, driving a "Chevy-A" won the 1992 CART championship, the fifth consecutive (and final) for the 265-A. Al Unser Jr. won the 1992 Indianapolis 500 driving a "Chevy-A", also the fifth consecutive (and final) Indy 500 win for the 265-A. Emerson Fittipaldi drove a "Chevy-B" to 4th place in points, but both he and Mears dropped out of that year's Indy 500 due to crashes.

At this time Ilmor faced new competition from Cosworth, which had just introduced their new Ford-Cosworth XB V8.

=== 1993–1994 ===
For the 1993 season, the 265-C engine was introduced as a replacement for both the 265-A and the 265-B. The "Chevy-C" was used widely, and brought continued success for Ilmor. Some backmarker teams continued to run 265-A or 265-B engines during the 1993 season, but neither the "A" nor the "B" would win another Indy car race. Chevrolet dropped its badging support after the 1993 season.

In 1994, Ilmor introduced two new engines, the 265-D and the 265-E. The "D" would later be badged as the "Ilmor Mercedes-Benz D". The "E" was a top-secret 209 in^{3} (3.42 L) purpose-built, V8 pushrod engine developed for Team Penske for the 1994 Indianapolis 500. While most Ilmor teams upgraded to the "D", the "C" and a variant called the "C+" saw some limited use during the 1994 season.

== Applications ==
- Truesports 91C
- Truesports 92C
- Rahal-Hogan R/H-001
- Lola T87/00
- Lola T88/00
- Lola T89/00
- Lola T90/00
- Lola T91/00
- Galmer G92
- Lola T92/00
- Lola T93/00
- March 86C
- March 87C
- March 88C
- March 89C
- Penske PC-12
- Penske PC-15
- Penske PC-16
- Penske PC-17
- Penske PC-18
- Penske PC-19
- Penske PC-20
- Penske PC-21
- Penske PC-22
