= Penske PC-12 =

- Category: CART IndyCar
- Constructor: Penske
- Designer: Geoff Ferris
- Predecessor: Penske PC-11
- Successor: Penske PC-15

Technical specifications
- Chassis: Aluminum Monocoque
- Suspension: Inboard springs and Fox shocks front and rear, operated by top rocker arm with front and lower rear A arms of streamline tubing
- Engine: Ford-Cosworth 2,650 cc (161.7 cu in) V8 80° Mid-engined, longitudinally mounted
- Transmission: Hewland V.G. 4 speed manual
- Weight: 1,550 lb (703.1 kg)
- Fuel: Methanol, supplied by Mobil
- Tyres: Goodyear Eagle Speedway Specials - Rear 27.0x14.5-15 - Front 25.5x10.0-15

Competition history
- Notable entrants: Penske Racing
- Notable drivers: Rick Mears; Al Unser; Johnny Rutherford; Mike Thackwell
Races	Wins	Podiums	Poles
16	1	1	2

The Penske PC-12 was a CART open-wheel race car, designed by Penske Racing, which was constructed for competition in the 1984 IndyCar season.
