= Harry Sauce =

American racing driver

- Nationality: American
- Born: September 2, 1946 (age 80) Jackson, Mississippi
- Retired: 2008

Previous series
- 1989 1983, 1988: American Racing Series; Indianapolis 500

Harry L. Sauce, Jr. (born September 2, 1946) is an attorney, former circuit judge of Hamilton County, Indiana, and a former American racing driver, primarily in SCCA.

Born in Jackson, Mississippi, Sauce received a B.A. in political science from Ole Miss, and J.D. from the Indiana University Maurer School of Law in 1972. He was a judge of the Indiana Circuit Court for 15 years, from 1975 to 1990. Sauce drove one race in the ARS series, and tried to race in Indy car racing, but was unsuccessful.

Sauce entered into the Indianapolis 500 twice (1983 and 1988), but he did not qualify either time. In 1983, his entry was declined due to not having enough experience. In 1988, he returned and tried to take his rookie test in Johnny Rutherford's back-up car. On the final phase of his rookie test, he spun out and slid into the grass in turn one. Two days later, he withdrew from the event due to mechanical issues.

Sauce continued to race SCCA into the 2000s with his brother, Mike Sauce and his niece, Megan Sauce, but was severely injured in a crash in 2008 - ending his career. He continues to be a partner in his law firm Sauce & Tardy in Noblesville, Indiana.

== Racing record ==
=== SCCA National Championship Runoffs ===
Year	Track	Car	Engine	Class	Finish	Start	Status
1975	Road Atlanta	Triumph Spitfire	BMC	F Production	17	17	Retired
1977	Road Atlanta	Triumph Spitfire	BMC	F Production	11	10	Running
1983	Road Atlanta	Toyota Corolla	Toyota	GT3	28	25	Retired
1992	Road Atlanta	Swift DB1	Ford	Formula Ford	25	21	Retired
1993	Road Atlanta	Shelby Can-Am	Dodge	Shelby Can-Am			Did not start
1993	Road Atlanta	Swift DB1	Ford	Formula Ford	30	22	Running
1998	Mid-Ohio	Swift Cooper SC94	Ford	Formula Continental	21	21	Running
1999	Mid-Ohio	Swift Cooper SC99	Ford	Formula Continental	14	23	Running
2000	Mid-Ohio	Swift Cooper SC94	Ford	Formula Ford	8	23	Running
2001	Mid-Ohio	Swift DB6	Ford	Formula Ford	11	28	Running
2002	Mid-Ohio	Swift DB6	Ford	Formula Ford	13	23	Running
2003	Mid-Ohio	Swift DB6	Ford	Formula Ford	15	22	Running
2004	Mid-Ohio	Swift DB6	Ford	Formula Ford	27	17	Retired
2005	Mid-Ohio	Swift DB6	Ford	Formula Ford	25	20	Retired
2006	Heartland Park	Swift DB6	Ford	Formula Ford	27	8	Retired
2007	Heartland Park	Swift DB6	Ford	Formula Ford	24	13	Retired

=== American open–wheel racing results ===
(key) (Races in bold indicate pole position) (Races in italics indicate fastest lap)

==== American Racing Series ====
Year	Team	1	2	3	4	5	6	7	8	9	10	11	12	Rank	Points
1989	Barclay Racing	PHX	LBH	MIL	DET	POR	MED	TOR	POC	MOH; 14	ROA	NZR	LS	—	0

==== Indy 500 results ====
Year	Chassis	Engine	Start	Finish
1983	Entry denied			
1988	March	Cosworth	Spun during rookie test	
