= Penske PC-17 =

Racing car

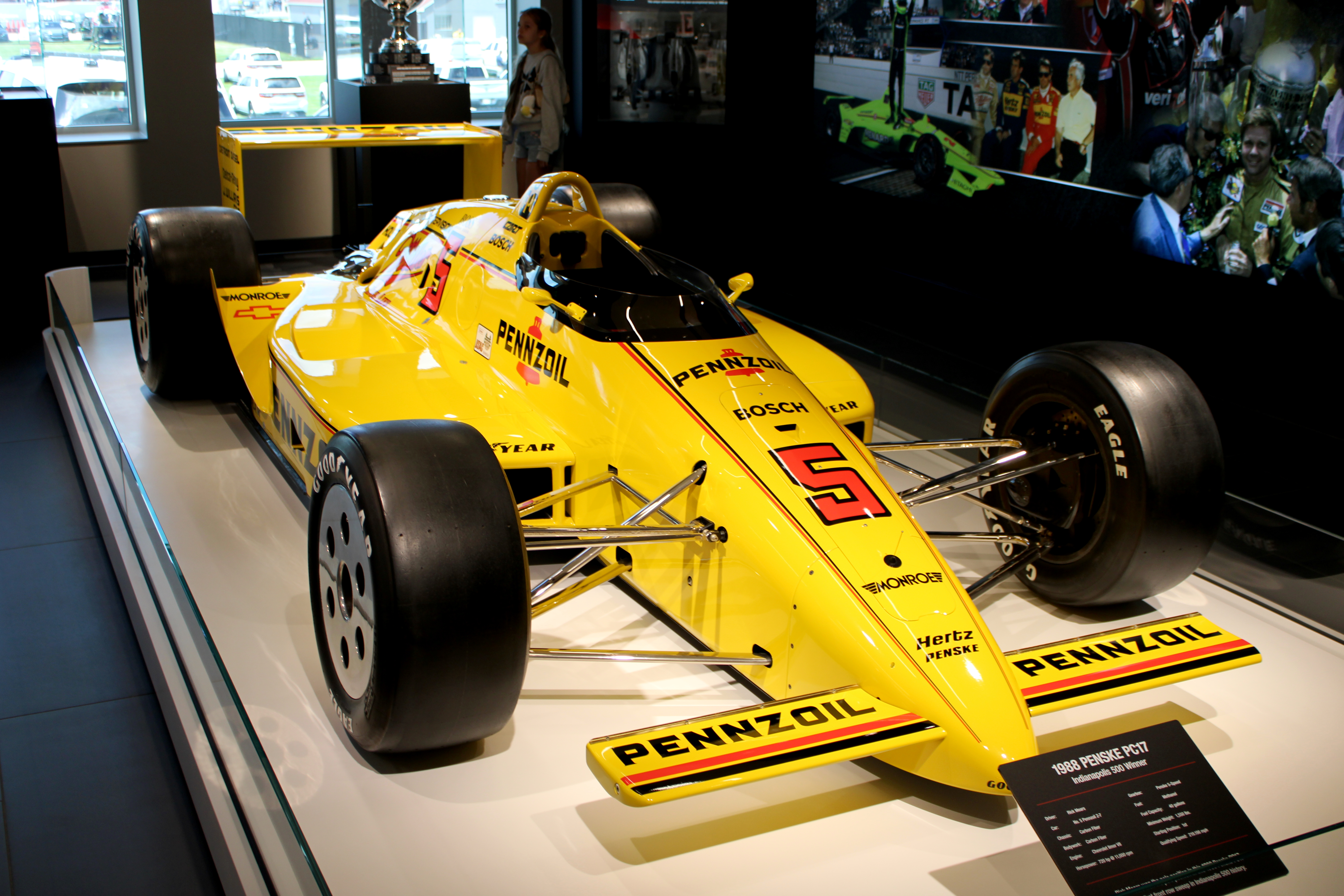
Rick Mears' winning PC-17 at the 1988 Indianapolis 500.

The Penske PC-17 was a CART Penske Racing car which was constructed for competition in the 1988 season. The car was designed by Nigel Bennett. The chassis swept the front row at the 1988 Indianapolis 500 with Rick Mears winning the pole position, Danny Sullivan qualifying second and Al Unser, Sr. third. Mears went on to win the Indy 500 and Sullivan the season championship.

The PC-17 ushered in a new era of success for the Penske chassis program, which had suffered in the past few seasons of competition.

== Complete Indy Car World Series results ==
(key) (Results in bold indicate pole position)

Year	Team	Engine	Tyres	Driver	No.	1	2	3	4	5	6	7	8	9	10	11	12	13	14	15	16	17	Points	D.C.
1988	Team Penske	Chevrolet 265A V8t	G			PHX	LBH	INDY	MIL	POR	CLE	TOR	MEA	MIC	POC	MDO	ROA	NAZ	LAG	MIA				
1988	Team Penske	Chevrolet 265A V8t	G	(United States) Rick Mears	5	**22**	8	**1**	1	6	23	6	3	**13**	**23**	3	12	7	5	2			**129**	**4th**
1988	Team Penske	Chevrolet 265A V8t	G	(United States) Danny Sullivan	9	23	**13**	23*	2	**1**	**3**	**2**	4	1	18	**5**	**4**	**1**	**1**	**5**			**182**	**1st**
1988	Team Penske	Chevrolet 265A V8t	G	(United States) Al Unser	1			3															**23***	**19th***
1988	Team Penske	Chevrolet 265A V8t	G	(United States) Al Unser	60									9	13								**23***	**19th***
1989	Patrick Racing	Chevrolet 265A V8t	G			PHX	LBH	INDY	MIL	DET	POR	CLE	MEA	TOR	MCH	POC	MDO	ROA	NAZ	LAG				
1989	Patrick Racing	Chevrolet 265A V8t	G	(Brazil) Emerson Fittipaldi	20	5	3																**196***	**1st***
1989	Arciero Racing	Cosworth DFX V8t	G	(Belgium) Didier Theys	12	20	23	20	17														**9***	**21st***
1989	Arciero Racing	Cosworth DFX V8t	G	(Italy) Fabrizio Barbazza	12					20	21	26	24	8			20	12		21			**6**	**24th**
1989	Arciero Racing	Cosworth DFX V8t	G	(United States) Rich Vogler	12										28								**5***	**25th***
1990	Arciero Racing	Buick 3300 V6t	G			PHX	LBH	INDY	MIL	DET	POR	CLE	MEA	TOR	MCH	DEN	VAN	MDO	ROA	NAZ	LAG			
1990	Arciero Racing	Buick 3300 V6t	G	(United States) Rich Vogler	8			DNQ															-	NC
1990	Arciero Racing	Buick 3300 V6t	G	(United States) Randy Lewis	12	21	22	14	14	12	16	21	22	17	12	16	17	28	21	20	22		**2**	**28th**
1990	Arciero Racing	Buick 3300 V6t	G	(United States) Buddy Lazier	24										26								**1***	**30th***
1990	Arciero Racing	Cosworth DFX V8t	G	(United States) Steve Bren	24		25																**0**	**42nd**
1990	Walther Motorsports	Cosworth DFS V8t	G	(United States) Salt Walther	77			DNQ							DNS								-	NC
1991	Arciero Racing	Buick 3300 V6t	G			SFR	LBH	PHX	INDY	MIL	DET	POR	CLE	MEA	TOR	MCH	DEN	VAN	MDO	ROA	NAZ	LAG		
1991	Arciero Racing	Buick 3300 V6t	G	(United States) Mark Dismore	12	20	21	15	DNQ														**0**	**38th**
1991	Arciero Racing	Buick 3300 V6t	G	(United States) Pancho Carter	12				21	14													**3***	**26th***
1991	Arciero Racing	Buick 3300 V6t	G	(United States) Jeff Wood	12						24	20											**0**	**31st**

*Includes points scored by other cars.
