= Billy Vukovich III =

American racing driver

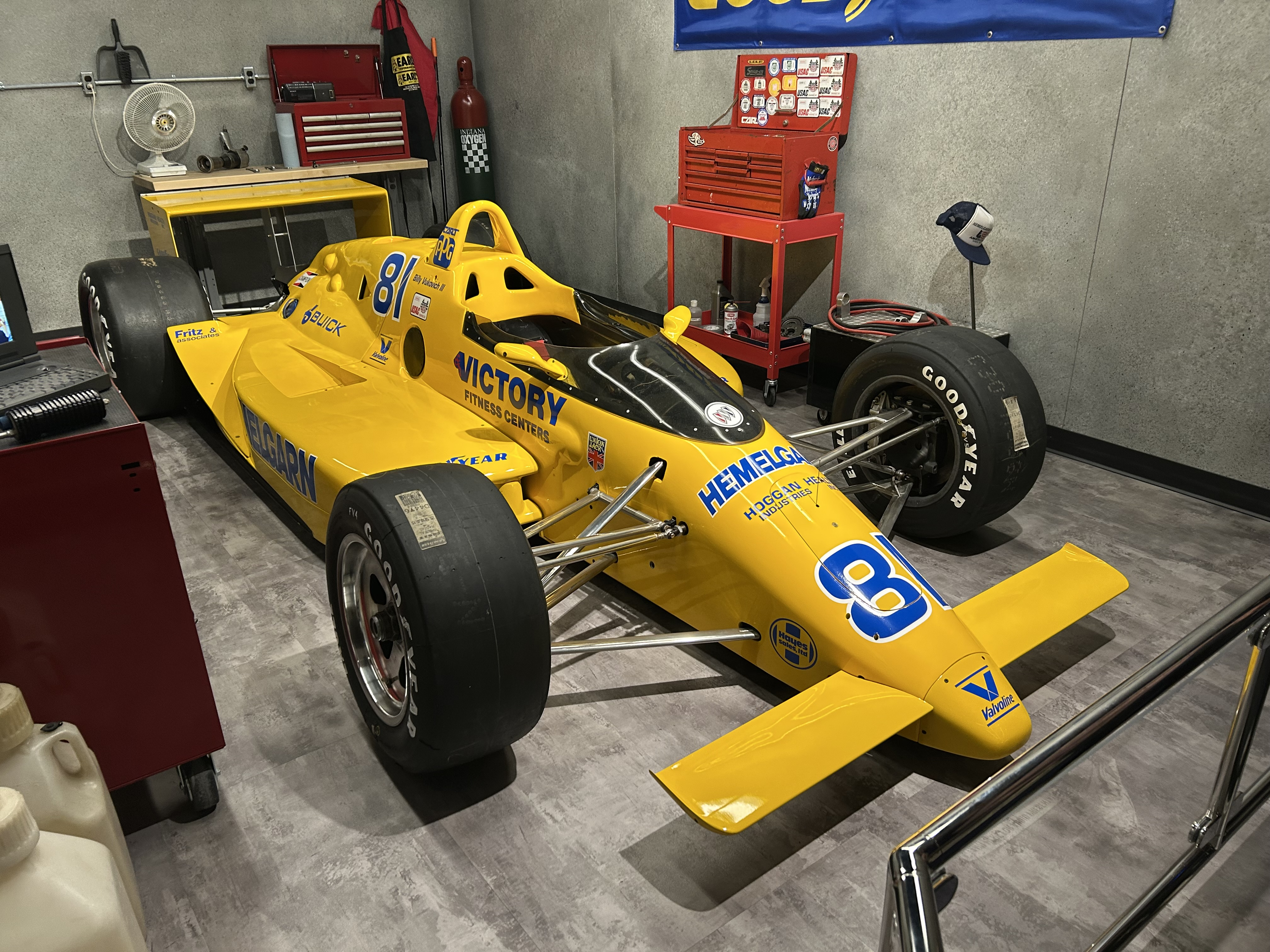
- Born: William John Vukovich III; August 31, 1963; Fresno, California, U.S.
- Died: November 25, 1990 (aged 27); Bakersfield, California, U.S.
- Cause of death: Racing accident
- Relatives: Bill Vukovich (grandfather); Bill Vukovich II (father)

William John Vukovich III (August 31, 1963 – November 25, 1990) was an American race car driver. He was a three-time starter of the Indianapolis 500. The grandson of two-time Indianapolis 500 winner Bill Vukovich and the son of Bill Vukovich II, Vukovich III was the 1988 Indianapolis 500 Rookie of the Year. Billy Vukovich III was killed in practice for a CRA race at Mesa Marin Raceway, in Bakersfield, California, when his throttle stuck open which caused his car to swerve into the wall. He was 27 years old.

Vukovich became the first third-generation driver to qualify in Indy 500 history. His grandfather was killed while leading the 1955 Indianapolis 500.

Vukovich got his start in racing driving for the John Runjavac racing team.

== Motorsports career results ==
=== American open–wheel results ===
(key) (Races in bold indicate pole position)

==== CART/Indy Car ====
Year	Team	1	2	3	4	5	6	7	8	9	10	11	12	13	14	15	16	Rank	Points	Ref
1988	Gohr Racing	PHX; 11	LBH	INDY; 14	MIL	POR	CLE	TOR	MEA	MIS; 17	POC; 9	MDO	ROA	NAZ	LAG	MIA		**30th**	**6**	
1989	Hemelgarn Racing	PHX	LBH	INDY; 12	MIL	DET	POR	CLE	MEA	TOR	MIS	POC	MDO	ROA	NAZ	LAG		**34th**	**1**	
1990	Hemelgarn Racing	PHX	LBH	INDY; 24	MIL	DET	POR	CLE	MEA	TOR	MIS; 13	DEN	VAN	MDO	ROA	NAZ	LAG	**34th**	**0**	

==== Indy 500 results ====
Year	Car	Start	Qual	Rank	Finish	Laps	Led	Retired
1988	56	23	208.545	20	14	179	0	Flagged
1989	81	30	216.698	13	12	186	0	Flagged
1990	81	31	211.389	32	24	102	0	Engine
**Totals**						467	0	

Starts	3
Poles	0
Front Row	0
Wins	0
Top 5	0
Top 10	0
Retired	1

Sporting positions
Preceded by Fabrizio Barbazza	Indianapolis 500; Rookie of the Year; 1988	Succeeded by Bernard Jourdain; Scott Pruett
