= Lola T88/00 =

Racing car designed and built by Lola Cars

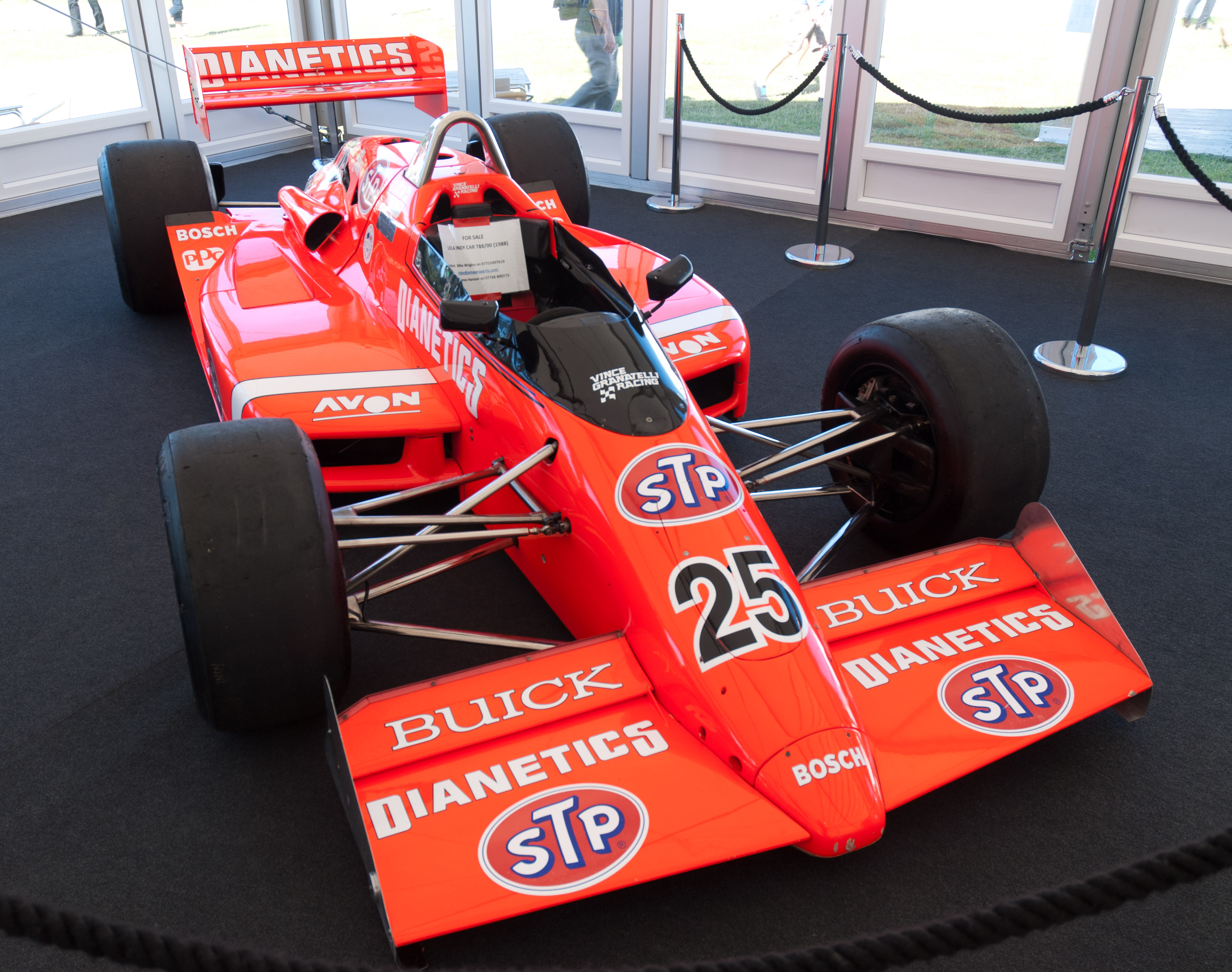
- Category: CART IndyCar
- Constructor: Lola
- Predecessor: Lola T87/00
- Successor: Lola T89/00

Technical specifications
- Length: 4,978 mm (196 in)
- Width: 2,032 mm (80 in)
- Height: 940 mm (37 in)
- Axle track: 1,753 mm (69 in) (Front); 1,638 mm (64 in) (Rear)
- Wheelbase: 3,048 mm (120 in)
- Engine: Ilmor-Chevrolet 265-A; Ford-Cosworth DFX; Judd AV 2.65 L (2,650 cc; 162 cu in) V8 mid-engined
- Transmission: 6-speed manual
- Weight: 1,550 lb (700 kg)
- Fuel: Methanol
- Tyres: Goodyear

Competition history
- Notable drivers: Mario Andretti
- Debut: 1988 Checker 200
Entries	Wins	Poles
15	4	0

The Lola T88/00 is an open-wheel racing car chassis, designed and built by Lola Cars that competed in the CART open-wheel racing series, for competition in the 1988 IndyCar season. It won a total of 4 races that season; 2 for Bobby Rahal, and 2 for Mario Andretti. It was powered by the Ilmor-Chevrolet 265-A turbo engine, but also used the Ford-Cosworth DFX, and the Judd AV.
