= March 88C =

The March 88C is an open-wheel race car, designed and built by March Engineering, to compete in the 1988 IndyCar season. The 88C chassis won four out of the 15 races, all with Al Unser Jr., but only managed to score 1 pole position, with Michael Andretti in Milwaukee. It was powered by numerous engines, including the Cosworth DFX turbo engine, the Ilmor-Chevrolet 265-A engine, the Porsche Indy V8 engine, the Buick Indy V6 engine, and the Judd AV.
