= Dale Coyne =

American racing driver

- Born: July 8, 1954 (age 72) Minooka, Illinois, U.S.
- Retired: 1991

CART World Series
- Years active: 1984–1989, 1991
- Teams: Dale Coyne Racing
- Starts: 34
- Wins: 0
- Poles: 0
- Best finish: 34th in 1986 & 1988

Dale Coyne (born July 8, 1954 in Minooka, Illinois) is an IndyCar Series team owner and former CART auto racing team owner and driver.

== Driving career ==
Coyne made his CART debut in 1984 at Portland, but failed to qualify. He attempted to make five other races that year, but only made the field in one of them, the race at Mid-Ohio where he finished 14th in his first race.

Coyne returned in 1985 and again failed to qualify or had mechanical issues that prevented him from qualifying in the first five races he attempted. The first race that season that he made was his first oval start, at Michigan International Speedway and he was knocked out after 40 laps due to engine trouble. Coyne made four more starts that season and was sidelined in all of them by mechanical problems.

Coyne and his team built their new proprietary chassis, the DC-1, for 1986 but results did not substantially improve. The car missed the field in its first attempt at Phoenix and caught on fire in pit lane at Long Beach. It wasn't until September that the car managed to finish a race, with Coyne bringing home a 12th-place finish at Sanair Super Speedway. Coyne was earlier credited with 12th place at Cleveland even though he was taken out of the race by a broken half-shaft. The two points that he earned for these races would be the most he would earn in a season in his career and he was credited with 34th place in the championship standings.

The DC-1 was disposed of for 1987 and Coyne switched to the more reliable year-old March 86C chassis. However, Coyne again missed the first three races of the season and made his first start in June at Portland. He made 8 starts but only finished one race and did not earn any championship points.

Coyne returned with the same, now two-year-old, March chassis in 1988 and after failing to qualify for the Phoenix race, made his first attempt to qualify for the Indianapolis 500, but failed to make that race as well. He made nine starts in 14 attempts that year and finished two of them. He was credited with a single point and 12th place in the Miami race despite being knocked out by engine failure.

Coyne attempted to make the Indy 500 again in 1989 but missed the field. He also drove in the Pocono Raceway race but was knocked out after four laps by gearbox failure.

Coyne returned to the cockpit in 1991 when he had no pay driver to fill his seat and made two starts in three attempts, but again suffered mechanical issues in both races.

== Team ownership ==
Coyne largely retired from competition in 1989 to field other drivers and formed Payton Coyne Racing in 1998 with Walter Payton. In his early years of team ownership, Coyne launched some impressive careers, including that of Paul Tracy (1991) and Michel Jourdain Jr. (1997). The perennial hopeful never had substantial funding and scored a then-best finish of 3rd at the 1996 U.S. 500 at Michigan International Speedway with veteran Roberto Moreno. The result was matched in 2004 when Oriol Servia accomplished the feat at Mazda Raceway Laguna Seca. Servia also scored the team's best finish in the points with 10th.

2007 was a breakout year for Dale Coyne Racing. With driver Bruno Junqueira behind the wheel, he posted three consecutive podium finishes (Zolder, Belgium; Assen, the Netherlands & Surfers Paradise, Australia) for the team and gave Dale Coyne Racing its highest finish ever with a second place in Zolder, Belgium in August.

With open-wheel unification prior to the 2008 season, Dale Coyne Racing made the transition to the IndyCar Series for 2008 with Junqueira joined by rookie Mario Moraes

In the 2009 season, Dale Coyne Racing entered one driver into the Indycar series, Justin Wilson in the #18. On July 5 Wilson won the Camping World Grand Prix at Watkins Glen and gave Coyne his first championship-level victory as either driver or owner.

In 2018, Dale Coyne Racing fielded two cars. The #18 entry went under the Dale Coyne Racing with Vasser-Sullivan banner, driven by Sebastian Bourdais. Bourdais picked up his second consecutive win on the streets of St. Petersburg. The #19 entry was shared between Brazilian driver Pietro Fittipaldi and Canadian Zachary Claman de Melo. In addition, Dale Coyne Racing fielded further entries for the 2018 Indianapolis 500 for Pippa Mann and Conor Daly.

For the 2020 season, Dale Coyne Racing with Vasser-Sullivan fielded an entry for Santino Ferrucci. The team also formed a partnership with Team Goh to run driver Álex Palou in its #55 Dale Coyne Racing with Team Goh entry.

The team continued its partnership with Vasser-Sullivan in 2021 and welcomed back 2017 INDYCAR Rookie of the Year Ed Jones to pilot its #18 entry. It also created a new partnership with Rick Ware Racing to form Dale Coyne Racing with RWR and hired Formula 1 veteran Romain Grosjean to drive its #51 Honda. Grosjean had a great season, scoring three podium finishes and registering eight top seven starts, including one pole position.

For its 2022 campaign, the team chose Formula 1 and NTT Indycar Series veteran and two-time Indianapolis 500 winner Takuma Sato to pilot its #51 Dale Coyne Racing with RWR entry, while 2021 Indy Lights vice-champion David Malukas took over driving duties of the newly formed Dale Coyne Racing with HMD Motorsports #18 Honda entry.

Malukas started in the top 10 seven times and picked up three top 10 finishes, including a second-place finish at WorldWide Technology Raceway.

In 2023, Malukas returned to the team for his sophomore season and picked up another podium finish at WorldWide Technology Raceway. Rookie Sting Ray Robb was behind the wheel of the Dale Coyne Racing with RWR entry.

2025 marked the team’s 42nd consecutive year of competition in American open-wheel racing.

== Racing record ==
=== American Open Wheel racing results ===
(key)

==== CART ====
Year	Team	Chassis	Engine	1	2	3	4	5	6	7	8	9	10	11	12	13	14	15	16	17	Rank	Points	Ref
1984	Dale Coyne Racing	Eagle 81	Chevrolet V8	LBH	PHX	INDY	MIL	POR; DNQ	MEA; DNQ	CLE; DNQ	MIS; DNQ	ROA; DNQ	POC	MOH; 14	SAN	MIS2	PHX2; DNQ	LS; DNQ	CEA		NC	0	
1985	Dale Coyne Racing	Lola T900	Chevrolet V8	LBH; DNQ	INDY	MIL; DNS	POR; DNQ	MEA; DNQ	CLE; DNS	MIS; 24	ROA; 23	POC; 27	MOH; 28	SAN	MIS2; DNS	LS; 27	PHX; DNQ	MIA; DNQ			NC	0	
1986	Dale Coyne Racing	Coyne DC-1	Chevrolet V8	PHX; DNQ	LBH; 23	INDY	MIL	POR; 21	MEA; DNQ	CLE; 12	TOR; DNQ	MIS; DNQ	POC; 26	MOH; 23	SAN; 12	MIS2; DNQ	ROA; 17	LS; DNS	PHX2; DNQ	MIA; 25	34th	2	
1987	Dale Coyne Racing	March 86C	Chevrolet V8	LBH; DNS	PHX; DNQ	INDY	MIL; DNQ	POR; 17	MEA; 15	CLE; 25	TOR; 18	MIS; DNS	POC; 24	ROA; 17	MOH; 20	NAZ; DNQ	LS; 21	MIA; DNQ			40th	0	
1988	Dale Coyne Racing	March 86C	Chevrolet V8	PHX; DNS	LBH	INDY; DNQ	MIL; 13	POR; 24	CLE; 25	TOR; 16	MEA; 22	MIS; 27	POC; DNQ	MOH; 24	ROA; DNS	NAZ; DNQ	LS; 27	MIA; 12			34th	1	
1989	Dale Coyne Racing	Lola T88/00	Cosworth DFX V8t	PHX	LBH	INDY; DNQ	MIL	DET	POR	CLE	MEA	TOR	MIS	POC; 27	MOH	ROA	NAZ	LS			51st	0	
1991	Dale Coyne Racing	Lola T90/00	Cosworth DFS V8t	SRF	LBH	PHX	INDY	MIL; 21	DET; DNQ	POR; 23	CLE	MEA	TOR	MIS	DEN	VAN	MOH	ROA	NAZ	LS	46th	0	

==== Indianapolis 500 ====
Year	Chassis	Engine	Start	Finish	Team
1988	March 86C	Chevrolet 6.5L V8	DNQ		Dale Coyne Racing
1989	Lola T88/00	Ford Cosworth DFX	DNQ		Dale Coyne Racing
