= Scott Atchison (racing driver) =

American racing driver (born 1962)

Scott Atchison (born July 16, 1962) is an American former racing driver from Bakersfield, California who competed in the CART IndyCar World Series in 1988 and 1989. He made 13 starts his rookie year and finished 20th in series points for Machinists Union Racing. He returned the following year to make three mid-summer road course starts for Euromotorsport. His best CART finish was ninth place at Long Beach and Miami his rookie year. He attempted to qualify for the 1988 Indianapolis 500 but was bumped from the field.

== Racing record ==
=== American open–wheel racing results ===
(key)

==== SCCA National Championship Runoffs ====
Year	Track	Car	Engine	Class	Finish	Start	Status
1985	Road Atlanta	Swift DB1	Ford	Formula Ford	1	1	Running

==== Formula Super Vee ====
Year	Team	Chassis	Engine	1	2	3	4	5	6	7	8	9	10	11	12	Rank	Points
1987	Zephyr Racing, Simpson Racing	Ralt RT5/85, 86, 87	VW Brabham, Bunce	LBH; 3	PHX; 5	IRP; 2	MIL; 1	DET; 3	MEA; 1	CLE; 1	ROA; 4	MOH; 3	NAZ; 1	MIA; 7	STP; 3	1st	189

==== CART PPG Indy Car World Series ====
Year	Team	1	2	3	4	5	6	7	8	9	10	11	12	13	14	15	Pos.	Points	Ref
1988	Machinists Union Racing	PHX; 12	LBH; 9	INDY; DNQ	MIL; 16	POR; 25	CLE; 12	TOR; 13	MEA; 10	MCH; 10	POC; 12	MOH; 15	ROA; 20	NAZ; Wth	LAG; 25	MIA; 9	20th	17	
1989	Euromotorsport	PHX	LBH	INDY	MIL	DET	POR; 17	CLE; 27	MEA; 14	TOR	MCH	POC	MOH	ROA	NAZ	LAG	37th	0	

Sporting positions
Preceded by Jackson Younge	US Formula Ford National Championship; Champion; 1985	Succeeded by Jimmy Vasser
Preceded by Didier Theys	US Formula Super Vee; Champion; 1987	Succeeded by Ken Murillo
