= Lola T87/00 =

Racing car designed and built by Lola Cars

- Category: CART IndyCar
- Constructor: Lola
- Predecessor: Lola T86/00
- Successor: Lola T88/00

Technical specifications
- Length: 4,978 mm (196 in)
- Width: 2,032 mm (80 in)
- Height: 940 mm (37 in)
- Axle track: 1,753 mm (69 in) (Front); 1,638 mm (64 in) (Rear)
- Wheelbase: 3,048 mm (120 in)
- Engine: Ford-Cosworth DFX 2.65 L (2,650 cc; 162 cu in) V8 mid-engined
- Transmission: 6-speed manual
- Power: 800 hp (600 kW)
- Weight: 1,550 lb (700 kg)
- Fuel: Methanol
- Tyres: Goodyear

Competition history
- Notable drivers: Mario Andretti
- Debut: 1987 Toyota Grand Prix of Long Beach
| Entries | Wins | Poles |
|---|---|---|
| 15 | 5 | 9 |

The Lola T87/00 is an open-wheel racing car chassis, designed and built by Lola Cars that competed in the CART open-wheel racing series, for competition in the 1987 IndyCar season. It won a total of 5 races and took 9 pole positions that season, including the prestigious Indianapolis 500, eight of the nine poles were with Mario Andretti. It was powered by the 800 hp (600 kW) Ford-Cosworth DFX.
