= Randy Lewis (racing driver) =

American racing driver

- Born: John Ranson Lewis III; July 18, 1945 (age 81); Charlotte, North Carolina, U.S.
- Occupations: Retired racing driver, winemaker
- Retired: 1992

Championship Auto Racing Teams (CART)
- Years active: 1983-1991
- Teams: Dale Coyne Racing, Arciero Racing, Dick Simon Racing
- Starts: 81
- Best finish: 14th in 1990, 1991 Indianapolis 500

Previous series
- 1969-1982: Formula Three, Formula 5000, Can-Am
- Spouse: Debbie Lewis (m. 1985; died 2017)
- Website: www.lewiscellars.com

John Ranson Lewis III (born July 18, 1945 in Charlotte, North Carolina), better known as Randy Lewis is an American racing driver who competed in the Indianapolis 500 five times. His best starting position was 11th in 1988 and 1989. His best finish was 14th in 1990 and 1991. His last race at Indy was in 1991. In his 81 CART starts, his best finish was an eighth in 1987.

Lewis started his career in Formula Three in Europe and gradually moved up to Formula 5000, then the Can-Am series.

== Motorsports career results ==
=== American open–wheel results ===
(key) (Races in bold indicate pole position)

==== CART/Indy Car ====
Year	Team	1	2	3	4	5	6	7	8	9	10	11	12	13	14	15	16	17	Rank	Points	Ref
1983	Sequential Circuits/AGFA	ATL	INDY	MIL	CLE	MIS1	ROA	POC	RIV	MDO	MIS2	LVG	LAG; 13	PHX					37th	0	
1984	Machinists Union Racing	LBG	PHX1	INDY	MIL	POR	MEA; DNQ	CLE; 26	MIS1	ROA; DNQ	POC	MDO	SAN	MIS2	PHX2				52nd	0	
1984	Wysard Motor Co.															LAG; 19	LVG; 23		52nd	0	
1986	Buckner Racing	PHX	LBG; 10	INDY	MIL	POR	MEA; 10	CLE; 20	TOR; 11	MIS	POC	MDO; 15	SAN	MCH	ROA; 24	LAG; 18	PHX	MIA; 14	25th	8	
1987	Leader Card Racing	LBG; 8	PHX; 19	INDY; 32	MIL; 19	POR; 8	MEA; 23	CLE; 12	TOR; 9	MIS; 15	POC; 16	ROA; 13	MDO; 22	NAZ; DNQ	LAG; 19	MIA; 19			21st	15	
1988	Leader Card Racing	PHX; 17	LBG; 21	INDY; 15	MIL; 21	POR; 22	CLE; 21	TOR; 21	MEA; 13	MIS; 14	POC; 20	MDO; 21	ROA; 9	NAZ	LAG; 15	MIA; 10			29th	7	
1989	Dick Simon Racing	PHX; 13	LBG; 15	INDY; 29	MIL; 15	DET; 16	POR; 16	CLE; 23	MEA; 16	TOR; 15	MIS; 27	POC; 18	MDO; 17	ROA; 14	NAZ	LAG; 16			35th	0	
1990	Arciero Racing	PHX; 21	LBG; 22	INDY; 14	MIL; 14	DET; 12	POR; 16	CLE; 21	MEA; 22	TOR; 17	MIS; 12	DEN; 16	VAN; 17	MDO; 28	ROA; 21	NAZ; 20	LAG; 22		28th	2	
1991	Dale Coyne Racing	SUR; 13	LBG; 15	PHX; 19	INDY; 14	MIL	DET	POR	CLE	MEA; 14	TOR; 12	MIS; 16	DEN; 17	VAN	MDO; 15	ROA; 22	NAZ	LAG; 26	30th	1	

Series Summary

Years	Teams	Starts	Points	Poles	Wins	Podiums (Non-win)	Top 10s (Non-podium)	Championships
8	8	81	33	0	0	0	7	0

==== Indianapolis 500 results ====
Year	Chassis	Engine	Start	Finish
1987	March 87C	Cosworth	23rd	32nd
1988	Lola T8800	Cosworth	11th	15th
1989	Lola T8900	Cosworth	11th	29th
1990	Penske PC-17	Buick	12th	14th
1991	Lola T9000	Cosworth DFS	31st	14th

== See also ==
- List of celebrities who own wineries and vineyards
