= Ford-Cosworth Indy V8 engine =

Ford-Cosworth Indy V-8
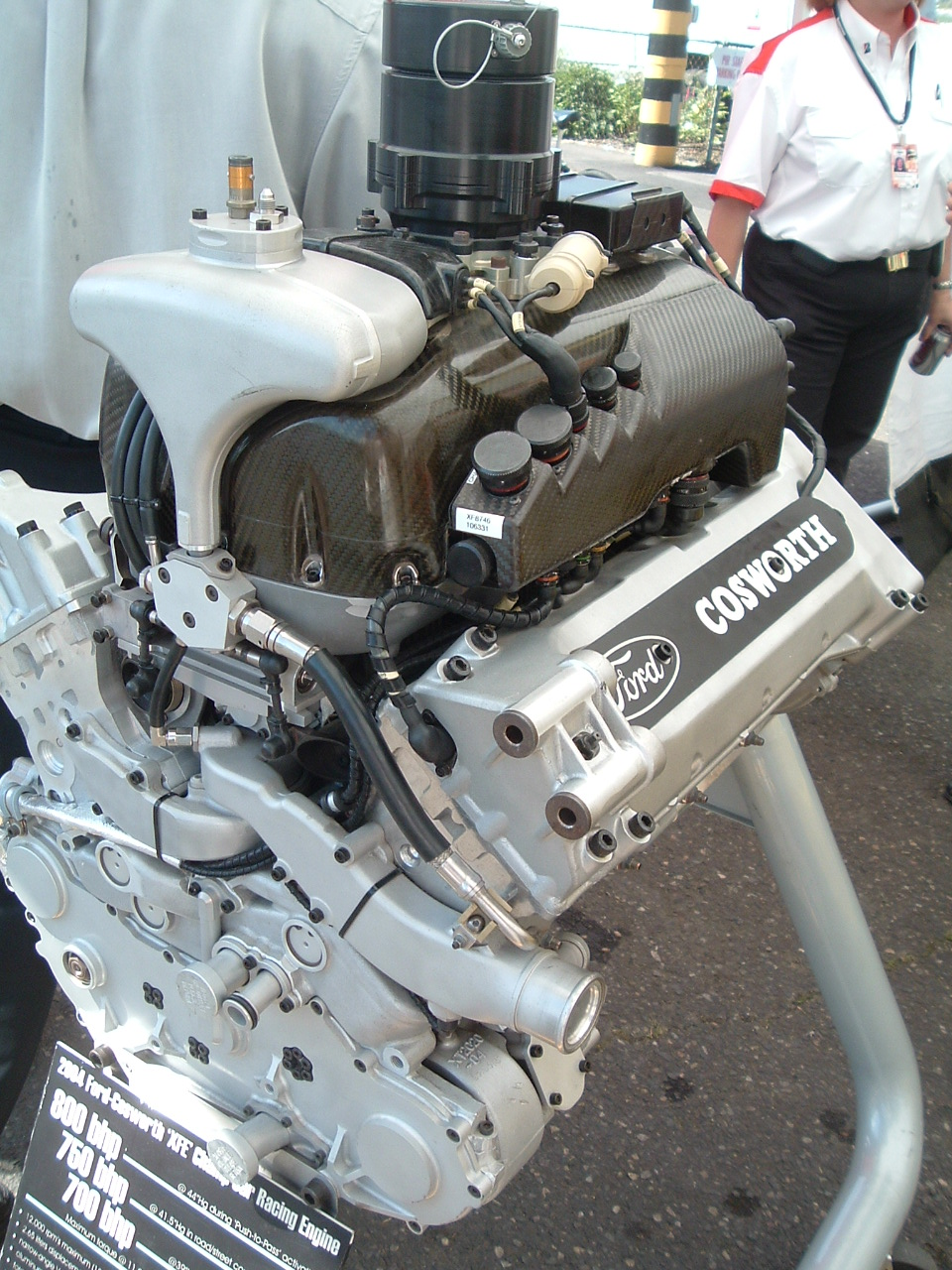

Overview
- Manufacturer: Ford-Cosworth
- Production: 1975–2007

Layout
- Configuration: 90° V-8
- Displacement: 2.65 L (162 cu in)
- Cylinder bore: 85.67 mm (3.373 in); 90 mm (3.5 in); 92 mm (3.6 in)
- Piston stroke: 57.3 mm (2.26 in); 52 mm (2.0 in); 49.8 mm (1.96 in)
- Valvetrain: 32-valve, DOHC, four-valves per cylinder
- Compression ratio: 11.2:1

Combustion
- Turbocharger: Cosworth
- Fuel system: Electronic fuel injection
- Fuel type: Gasoline/Methanol
- Oil system: Dry sump

Output
- Power output: 700–1,000 hp (522–746 kW)
- Torque output: 340–361 lb⋅ft (461–489 N⋅m)

Dimensions
- Dry weight: 120 kg (265 lb)

Chronology
- Predecessor: Ford Indy V8 engine

The Ford-Cosworth Indy V8 engine is a series of mechanically similar, turbocharged, 2.65-liter V-8 engines, designed and developed by Ford in partnership with Cosworth for use in American open-wheel racing. It was produced for over 30 years and was used in the United States Auto Club (USAC) Championship Car series, CART, and Champ Car World Series between 1976 and 2007. The DFX engine was the Indy car version of the highly successful 3-liter Ford-Cosworth DFV Formula One engine developed by former Lotus engineer Keith Duckworth and Colin Chapman backing from Ford for the Lotus 49 to campaign the 1967 season. This engine had 155 wins between 1967 and 1985 in F1. The DFX variant was initially developed for Indy car use by Parnelli Jones in 1976, with Cosworth soon taking over. This engine won the Indianapolis 500 ten consecutive years from 1978 to 1987, as well as winning all USAC and CART championships between 1977 and 1987. It powered 81 consecutive Indy car victories from 1981 to 1986, with 153 Indy car victories total.

== DFX ==
One of the most successful and longest-lived projects of Cosworth has been its Indy car engine program. In 1975; Cosworth developed the DFX, by destroking the engine to 2.65 L and adding a turbocharger, the DFX became the standard engine to run in IndyCar racing, ending the reign of the Offenhauser, and maintaining that position until the late 1980s.

A 2.65-L turbocharged version of the DFV was developed privately by the Vels Parnelli Jones team for the 1976 USAC season, in the face of opposition from Duckworth. The Parnelli-Cosworth car took its first victory at the 1976 Pocono 500, the fifth race of the season, driven by Al Unser. Unser and his Cosworth-powered Parnelli took two further victories before the end of the year, in Wisconsin and Phoenix, and finished the championship in fourth position.

Duckworth had been a guest of the Vels Parnelli team during the Pocono victory, as Parnelli Jones and Vel Miletich wanted to establish the team as the North American distributor for the turbocharged, Indycar-specification engine. However, shortly after the maiden race victory Cosworth poached two key engineers (Larry Sluter and Chikie Hirashima) from the Parnelli team and set up facilities in Torrance, California, to develop and market the engine themselves. Henceforth it became known as the DFX. It went on to dominate Indy car racing in much the same way the DFV had dominated Formula One. The engine won the Indianapolis 500 ten consecutive years from 1978 until 1987, as well as winning all USAC and CART championships between 1977 and 1987 except for one. For a brief time in the early 1980s, some of the DFX engines were badged as Fords. The DFX powered 81 consecutive Indy car victories from 1981 to 1986, and 153 victories total. By the time it was replaced, the DFX was developing over 840 bhp (630 kW).

== DFS ==
In 1986 GM financed British firm Ilmor to build a competitor to the DFX in Indy car racing. Mario Illien's Ilmor Indy V-8 quickly took over dominance of the sport.

Ford responded by commissioning Cosworth to redesign the DFX to include a number of DFR improvements. In 1989, they introduced an updated "short stroke" version of the Indy car engine which would be referred to as the "DFS" ("S" for short stroke)., and the Nikasil Aluminium liners, adopted on DFY in 1983.

The engine was fielded by two teams in its first season: Kraco Racing (Bobby Rahal) and Dick Simon Racing (Arie Luyendyk), and its development was an effort to regain dominance of the sport. At the 1989 Indianapolis 500, neither car qualified in the front two rows, but both started in the top ten. On race day, both drivers dropped out with engine failures. Rahal won one race in 1989 at the Meadowlands Grand Prix. However, the Kraco team merged with Galles at season's end, dropped the program, and switched to Chevrolets.

In 1990, the factory development was continued by Scott Brayton and Dominic Dobson, but neither won any races. The engine was utilized by other CART teams in 1991–1992, and was retired after the introduction of the Ford Cosworth XB with only one victory, that being Rahal's in 1989.

== XB / XD / XF / XFE ==
Ford-Cosworth designed a brand new line of engines for use in IndyCar to replace the aging DFX and DFS. The X-series, badged as the Ford-Cosworth, debuted in 1992, beginning with the XB. The powerplant won eight poles and five races in the 1992 season, and driver Michael Andretti finished second in points. In 1993, Nigel Mansell won five races en route to the 1993 CART championship, the first for the XB. In 1995, Jacques Villeneuve won the 1995 Indianapolis 500 and the 1995 series championship. The XB won 10 of 17 races that year, making 1995 its most successful year in CART.

The XB was replaced by the XD in the CART series for 1996. The XB, however, was used by several teams during the 1996 IRL season, and for the first two races of the 1996–97 season. The XB won all five IRL races in which it competed, including the 1996 Indianapolis 500.

The XF was developed for the 2000 season to replace the XD, and was chosen as the spec engine for the Champ Car World Series in 2003. The most recent derivative of the XF, the 2.65 L XFE continued in that role through the 2007 season. The Champ Car World Series imposed a rev limit of 12,000 rpm down from the over 15,000 rpm of 2002. The 2004 model of the XFE had a rated power of nominal 750 horsepower (559 kW; 760 PS) at 1,054 mmHg (intake boost pressure), and a maximum power of 800 bhp (597 kW; 811 PS) at 1130 mmHg (during Push-to-Pass). The 2004 XFE maximum speed was 12,000 rpm (rev limited) and torque of 490 N⋅m (361 lbf⋅ft). The aluminium and iron turbo housing ran a boost of 5.9 psi at sea level (= boost of 12 inches of mercury which is 41.5 inches of mercury absolute). The methanol-fuelled engine used a steel crankshaft and aluminium alloy pistons. Weight was 120 kg (264.6 lb) and length was 539 mm (21.2 in).

In 2007, the Ford name was removed from the engine pieces as the manufacturer elected not to continue sponsorship of the series. Several other engine changes were made, notably the removal of the calibrated "pop-off valve" designed to limit turbo boost pressure, replaced by engine electronics. The rated life of the engine was 1,400 miles (2,300 km) between rebuilds. Engines were sent by the race teams to Cosworth for the rebuild. In 2007, Champ Car switched to the new Panoz DP01 chassis, which was said to provide better ducting of airflow into the engine. The Champ Car World Series merged into the IndyCar Series prior to the 2008 season, and Cosworth does not currently provide engines to any American open-wheel racing series.

In mid-2003, Cosworth provided the 3.5 L V8 XG badged as a Chevrolet Gen 4 engine to IRL IndyCar Series teams after the proprietary Ilmor-built Chevrolet Gen 3 engine proved inadequate against rival Hondas and Toyotas during the 2003 season. While many teams left Chevrolet after the 2003 season, those that stayed saw a significant improvement in performance with the new "Chevworth" engine compared to their previous units. The XG finished second in its first race at Michigan on July 27, 2003. Sam Hornish, Jr. went on to win 3 races that season with the new XG. The XG was reduced in size to 3 L for the 2004 season and it won one race in 2005 during Chevrolet's final season in IRL.

== NME XB ==
NME XB V8

Overview
- Manufacturer: Nicholson McLaren
- Production: 2003–present

Layout
- Configuration: 80° V8
- Displacement: 2.8–3.5 L (170–210 cu in)
- Cylinder bore: 85.7–90 mm (3.4–3.5 in)
- Piston stroke: 60.7–68.7 mm (2.39–2.70 in)
- Valvetrain: 4-valve valves per cylinder, hydraulic valve lifters, belt-driven double overhead camshaft (DOHC)

Combustion
- Fuel system: Electronic fuel injection
- Fuel type: Gasoline
- Oil system: Dry sump
- Cooling system: Water-cooled

Output
- Power output: 550–650 hp (410–485 kW)
- Torque output: 256–320 lb⋅ft (347–434 N⋅m)

Dimensions
- Dry weight: 120 kg (265 lb)

The NME XB V8 is a four-stroke, naturally-aspirated, V8 racing engine, designed, developed, and built by British manufacturer Nicholson McLaren, for a variety of different applications and motor racing events, including sports car racing, open-wheel racing, hillclimb events and time trial events. It has been manufactured since 2003, and is based on the Ford-Cosworth XB Champ Car engine, albeit slightly enlarged, and minus the turbocharger. It was the sole engine used in the short-lived Grand Prix Masters series, and has also been used in various LMP2 cars.
