= 1989 Michigan 500 =

Coordinates: 42°03′58.68″N 84°14′29.18″W

(United States) 1989 Michigan 500
Race details
- Race 10 of 15 in the 1989 CART season
- Date: August 6, 1989
- Official name: 1989 Marlboro 500
- Location: Michigan International Speedway, Brooklyn, Michigan, United States
- Course: Permanent racing facility 2.000 mi / 3.219 km
- Distance: 250 laps 500.000 mi / 804.672 km
- Weather: Partly Cloudy with temperatures up to 80 °F (27 °C); wind speeds reaching up to 18 miles per hour (29 km/h)

Pole position
- Driver: (Brazil) Emerson Fittipaldi (Patrick Racing)
- Time: 219.827 mph (353.777 km/h)

Podium
- First: (United States) Michael Andretti (Newman-Haas Racing)
- Second: (Italy) Teo Fabi (Porsche)
- Third: (United States) Mario Andretti (Newman-Haas Racing)

The 1989 Michigan 500, the ninth running of the event, was held at the Michigan International Speedway in Brooklyn, Michigan, on Sunday, August 6, 1989. Branded as the 1989 Marlboro 500 for sponsorship reasons, the race was won by Michael Andretti. He is the first driver to win Michigan 500 twice. The event was race number 10 of 15 in the 1989 CART PPG Indy Car World Series.

== Background ==
Emerson Fittipaldi won the 1989 Indianapolis 500.

For the second straight year, Marlboro offered the Marlboro Million, offering a one million dollar prize should a driver win the Marlboro Grand Prix at the Meadowlands, the Marlboro 500 at Michigan, and the Marlboro Challenge. Three weeks before the Marlboro 500, Bobby Rahal won the Marlboro Grand Prix and entered Michigan still eligible for the Marlboro Million.

== Practice and Time Trials ==
The opening day of practice was led by 50 year-old Al Unser at 221.450 mph. Rick Mears suffered a crash when his rear brakes locked up and he spun into the inside pit wall. Driving his backup car, Mears was second fastest at 220.406 mph. Michael Andretti was third fastest at 220.069 mph.

Hot, humid, and windy weather slowed speeds for Friday's qualifying session. Emerson Fittipaldi won the pole at 219.827 mph. Rick Mears was second fastest at 218.155 mph. Completing the front row was Teo Fabi with a speed of 217.970 mph.

Both Roberto Guerrero and John Paul Jr. Crashed during their qualifying attempts. Guerrero's team went to a backup car and he started the race in 27th. Paul's team did not have a backup car and withdrew from the event.

On Saturday, the International Race of Champions competed at Michigan.

== Race ==
A crowd of 55,000 spectators were on hand for the running of the ninth Michigan 500.

From his starting spot on the outside of the front row, Teo Fabi led the first two laps of the race. Emerson Fittipaldi took the lead on lap three. On lap three, Steve Chassey and Rich Vogler crashed in the third turn.

Fittipaldi led 43 of the first 45 laps but soon ran into trouble when his car began leaking brake fluid. He was unable to stop his car and had to circle through the pits twice before coming to a rest. The problems took Fittipaldi out of contention for the win.

On lap 76, a caution was thrown for debris on track. After making his pit stop under caution, Michael Andretti spun upon acceleratation exiting his pit stall. When the race restarted, Andretti was given a stop and go penalty for driving backwards in the pits as he turned his car around. That gave the lead to Mario, who led Michael by half a lap.

Electrical problems caused Gordon Johncock's car to stall on track and bring out a caution on lap 111. Under caution, Michael Andretti was given a second stop and go penalty for passing under caution, although some believed the infraction was actually done by Mario Andretti who was driving an identical car.

The caution allowed Rick Mears to take the lead once Michael served his penalty. For the next 100 laps, Mears and the Andrettis swapped the lead several time as they were the only three cars on the lead lap.

After completing 135 laps, A. J. Foyt fell out of the race with a wheel bearing problem. In a television interview, Foyt was discouraged with the effort of his team, which had been criticized in the media leading up to the race. "All I've had is mechanical problems. The guys aren't... got their heads together. Just flat got their heads up their ass, if you want to know the truth about it... The car was screwed up from the first lap on. The waste gate was opening and closing, I was having trouble there. And then the bearing went out. We got here, they left the fuel lines loose, it caught the car on fire. Then they leave the bellow loose. They cross-thread two rear nuts. They just screwed up, that's all. I need to make a change."

Mario Andretti had been in contention for the win all day until lap 155 when he ran out of fuel and lost a lap to Michael and Mears.

On lap 199, John Jones spun in turn two, directly in the path of Phil Krueger. The two cars collided and hit the outside wall. Upon impact, the right-front wheel on Krueger's car entered the cockpit and hit Krueger in the helmet. He suffered a severe head injury, broke six ribs, and a broken collarbone. Krueger was not breathing when safety crew reached the car but was immediately administered oxygen. He was in a coma for the next 11 days. When Krueger awoke, he was convinced he had been shot down while flying a Sopwith Camel over France. Much of his memory was erased with amnesia. After recovering, Krueger returned to racing in 1991.

Under caution for the Krueger crash, Mears pitted for fuel and tires. After exiting the pits, he was passed by Michael Andretti in turn one who had pitted earlier. Mears' car owner Roger Penske attempted to file a protest, but CART stewards sided with Andretti who was bunching up with cars ahead of him for the caution period.

Mears passed Andretti when the green flag waved with 30 laps remaining but was repassed by Andretti a lap later. 10 laps later, Mears retook the lead. Leading the race with 10 laps to go, Mears slowed with suspension failure.

Michael Andretti led the last 10 laps and won by a lap over Teo Fabi who finished second. Mario Andretti was third. Michael became the first driver to win the Michigan 500 two times.

== Box score ==
Finish	Grid	No	Name	Entrant	Chassis	Engine	Laps	Time/Status	Led	Points
1	8	6	(United States) Michael Andretti	Newman/Haas Racing	Lola T89/00	Ilmor-Chevrolet	250	3:07:15.239	81	21
2	3	8	(Italy) Teo Fabi	Porsche Motorsports	March 89P	Porsche	249	+1 Lap	2	16
3	6	5	(United States) Mario Andretti	Newman/Haas Racing	Lola T89/00	Ilmor-Chevrolet	249	+1 Lap	45	14
4	7	2	(United States) Al Unser Jr.	Galles Racing	Lola T89/00	Ilmor-Chevrolet	249	+1 Lap	0	12
5	17	10	(Republic of Ireland) Derek Daly	Raynor Motorsports	Lola T89/00	Judd	247	+3 Laps	0	10
6	10	7	(Netherlands) Arie Luyendyk	Dick Simon Racing	Lola T89/00	Cosworth	246	+4 Laps	0	8
7	2	4	(United States) Rick Mears	Penske Racing	Penske PC-18	Ilmor-Chevrolet	245	+5 Laps	79	6
8	4	25	(United States) Al Unser	Penske Racing	Penske PC-18	Ilmor-Chevrolet	241	+9 Laps	0	5
9	9	18	(United States) Bobby Rahal	Kraco Racing	Lola T89/00	Cosworth	240	+10 Laps	0	4
10	21	17	(United States) Johnny Rutherford	Stoops Racing	Lola T88/00	Cosworth	240	+10 Laps	0	3
11	14	22	(United States) Scott Brayton	Dick Simon Racing	Lola T89/00	Cosworth	233	Engine	0	2
12	26	56	(United States) Jeff Wood	Gohr Racing	Lola T88/00	Cosworth	229	+21 Laps	0	1
13	24	50	(Italy) Guido Daccò	Euromotorsport	Lola T88/00	Cosworth	228	+22 Laps	0	0
14	1	20	(Brazil) Emerson Fittipaldi	Patrick Racing	Penske PC-18	Ilmor-Chevrolet	207	Suspension	43	1
15	28	44	(United States) Phil Krueger	US Engineering	March 86C	Cosworth	189	Crash	0	0
16	29	65	(Canada) John Jones	Protofab Racing	Lola T89/00	Cosworth	183	Crash	0	0
17	13	3	(United States) Scott Pruett	Truesports	Lola T89/00	Judd	149	Engine	0	0
18	25	14	(United States) A. J. Foyt	A. J. Foyt Enterprises	Lola T89/00	Cosworth	135	Wheel bearing	0	0
19	19	69	(Mexico) Bernard Jourdain	Andale Racing	Lola T89/00	Cosworth	124	Turbocharger	0	0
20	22	30	(Brazil) Raul Boesel	Doug Shierson Racing	Lola T89/00	Judd	120	Engine	0	0
21	18	91	(United States) Gordon Johncock	Hemelgarn Racing	Lola T89/00	Judd	103	Electrical	0	0
22	27	21	(Colombia) Roberto Guerrero	Alex Morales Motorsports	March 89CE	Alfa Romeo	99	Engine	0	0
23	5	1	(United States) Danny Sullivan	Penske Racing	Penske PC-18	Ilmor-Chevrolet	85	Handling	0	0
24	20	9	(United States) John Andretti	Vince Granatelli Racing	Lola T88/00	Buick	34	Engine	0	0
25	23	11	(United States) Kevin Cogan	Machinists Union Racing	March 88C	Cosworth	32	Manifold	0	0
26	11	29	(United States) Pancho Carter	Leader Card Racers	Lola T89/00	Cosworth	25	Engine	0	0
27	15	28	(United States) Randy Lewis	TeamKar International	Lola T89/00	Cosworth	16	Engine	0	0
28	12	12	(United States) Rich Vogler	Arciero Racing	Penske PC-17	Cosworth	2	Crash	0	0
29	16	16	(United States) Steve Chassey	Bettenhausen Motorsports	Lola T87/00	Cosworth	2	Crash	0	0

=== Failed to qualify ===
- (United States) John Paul Jr. (#19) – withdrawn
- (Canada) Ludwig Heimrath Jr. (#71)

=== Race statistics ===
Lap Leaders
Laps	Leader
1–2	Teo Fabi
3–45	Emerson Fittipaldi
46–49	Michael Andretti
50–57	Rick Mears
58–76	Michael Andretti
77–113	Mario Andretti
114–120	Michael Andretti
121–134	Rick Mears
135–142	Mario Andretti
143–172	Rick Mears
173–184	Michael Andretti
185–202	Rick Mears
203–219	Michael Andretti
220	Rick Mears
221–231	Michael Andretti
232–239	Rick Mears
240–250	Michael Andretti

Cautions: 8 for 59 laps
Laps	Reason
4–12	Rich Vogler and Steve Chassey crash turn 3
16–21	Randy Lewis engine
76–78	Debris
114–118	Debris
134–138	Bernard Jourdain engine
173–176	Unknown
200–220	Phil Krueger and John Jones crash turn 2
242–244	Unknown

== Broadcasting ==
The Michigan 500 was broadcast live on television by ABC. Paul Page was the lead announcer and was joined by Bobby Unser and Sam Posey as color commentators.
