= 1989 Indianapolis 500 =

American motor race

73rd Indianapolis 500
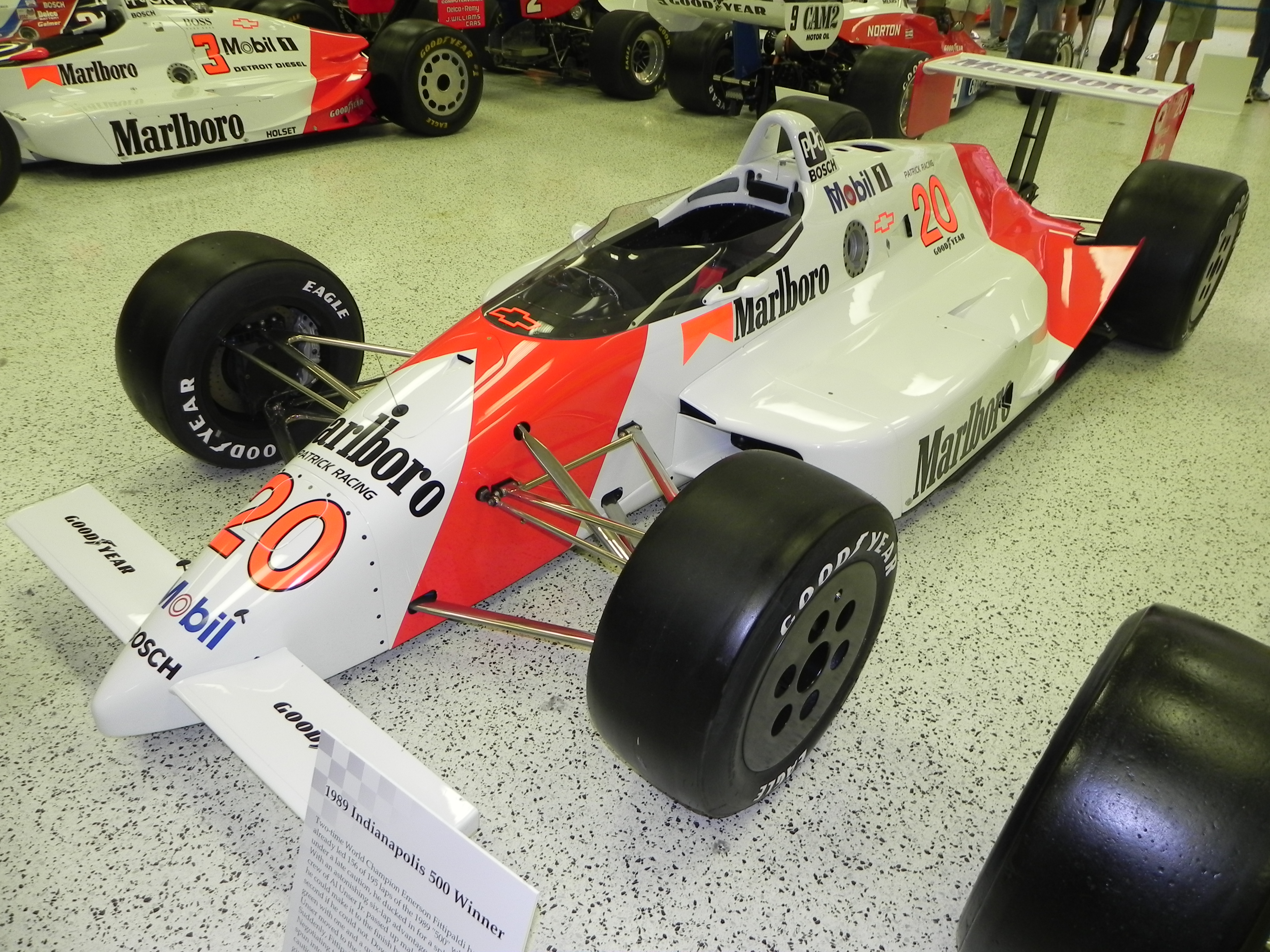

Indianapolis Motor Speedway

Indianapolis 500
- Sanctioning body: USAC
- Season: 1989 CART season 1988–89 Gold Crown
- Date: May 28, 1989
- Winner: (Brazil) Emerson Fittipaldi
- Winning team: Patrick Racing
- Winning Chief Mechanic: Tom Anderson
- Time of race: 2:59:01.04
- Average speed: 167.581 mph (269.695 km/h)
- Pole position: (United States) Rick Mears
- Pole speed: 223.885 mph (360.308 km/h)
- Fastest qualifier: (United States) Rick Mears
- Rookie of the Year: (Mexico) Bernard Jourdain & (United States) Scott Pruett (tie)
- Most laps led: (Brazil) Emerson Fittipaldi (158)

Pre-race ceremonies
- National anthem: Tom Hudnut
- "Back Home Again in Indiana": Jim Nabors
- Starting command: Mary F. Hulman
- Pace car: Pontiac Trans Am
- Pace car driver: Bobby Unser
- Starter: Duane Sweeney
- Estimated attendance: 400,000

Television in the United States
- Network: ABC
- Announcers: Host/Lap-by-lap: Paul Page; Color Analyst: Sam Posey; Color Analyst: Bobby Unser
- Nielsen ratings: 7.8 / 28

Chronology
Previous	Next
1988	1990

The 73rd Indianapolis 500 was held at the Indianapolis Motor Speedway in Speedway, Indiana on Sunday, May 28, 1989. The race was won by Emerson Fittipaldi, a two-time Formula One World Drivers' Champion. Fittipaldi became the first Indy 500 winner from Brazil, the first foreign-born winner of the race since Mario Andretti in 1969, and the first non-American winner since Graham Hill in 1966. Though Fittipaldi started on the front row and dominated much of the race, he found himself running second in the waning laps. Michael Andretti passed Fittipaldi for the lead on lap 154 (of 200), then led until his engine blew. Al Unser Jr. moved up to second position, but trailed Fittipaldi by a wide margin. Gambling on fuel mileage, Unser caught up to Fittipaldi after a fortuitous caution period on lap 181, and subsequently took the lead on lap 196.

On the 199th lap, Unser was leading Fittipaldi, at which time the two leaders encountered slower traffic. Down the backstretch, Unser and Fittipaldi weaved through the slower cars, then Fittipaldi dived underneath going into turn three. The two cars touched wheels, and Unser spun out, crashing into the outside retaining wall. Fittipaldi completed the final lap under caution behind the pace car to score his first of two Indy 500 victories. Unser was uninjured, and despite the crash, was still credited with second place. Fittipaldi received $1,001,600 in prize money, the first time an Indianapolis 500 winner received over one million dollars.

After dominating the previous year's race, all three cars of the Penske team failed to finish the race in 1989. Rick Mears won the pole position, his record fifth Indy pole, and Al Unser Sr. qualified second. Danny Sullivan, however, suffered a broken arm in a practice crash, and had to qualify a backup car on the second weekend of time trials, so he started 26th. Mechanical failures sidelined all three cars on race day. It was the only year in the decade of the 1980s, and the first time since 1976 that the Penske team failed to score a top-five finish. Apropos to that, Fittipaldi won the race with a Penske PC-18 chassis, which Patrick Racing had acquired from Penske in a complex and multi-faceted trade deal.

The race was sanctioned by USAC, and was included as part of the 1989 CART PPG Indy Car World Series. At season's end, Fittipaldi became the fourth driver since 1979 to win the Indy 500 and CART championship in the same season. The win was also Patrick Racing's third and final Indy victory (1973, 1982, 1989). Former driver Chip Ganassi, who had become co-owner at Patrick Racing in 1988, enjoyed his first of seven Indy victories (as of 2026) as a car owner or co-owner.

== Background and offseason ==
=== Track improvements ===
Speedway management resurfaced the entire track with asphalt during the summer of 1988, which would result in higher overall speeds for 1989. The last time the track had been repaved was in 1976. The apron at the bottom of the track (typically used for warm-up and cool-down laps, as well as an escape lane for slowing cars), which was previously known to be bumpy, relatively flat, and usually avoided by drivers, was also repaved. The racing surface was separated from the apron by a painted white line. The smooth and re-profiled apron was now tempting drivers to dip below the white line in practice and during the race. Drivers were starting to treat the apron as an extension of the track width. USAC announced penalties would be assessed for driving with four wheels below the white line excessively, other than to make routine passes in heavy traffic.

The rough and bumpy concrete pit lane was also paved over in asphalt and a guardrail was installed to protect the crew members in the sign board area. The newly paved pit area made egress and ingress to the pits smoother and safer, but also sharply increased entrance and exit speeds, potentially putting crew members at risk. Within a few years, after a succession of incidents on the Indy car circuit, as well as in NASCAR, pit road speed limits would be implemented to curtail excessive speeding through the pit lane. In addition, the pneumatic jacks built into the cars were found to be embedding themselves into the soft asphalt of the pit lane. This necessitated crews to affix steel plates on the pit lane to accommodate the jacks (a practice that was also later deemed unsafe). In 1994, this would be finally be solved when the individual pit boxes were resurfaced in concrete.

=== Rule changes ===
Goodyear arrived at the track providing both a hard and soft compound tire. The exclusive tire provider spent the off-season developing new tires that were better-suited to the newly repaved track. Teams were permitted to run either compound at any time, however, they were required to start the race on the same tires that they used during time trials. All teams qualified on the soft compounds, thus all were required to start the race on soft compounds. Teams electing to switch to hard compound tires for the race could do so on their first pit stop.

=== Team and driver changes ===
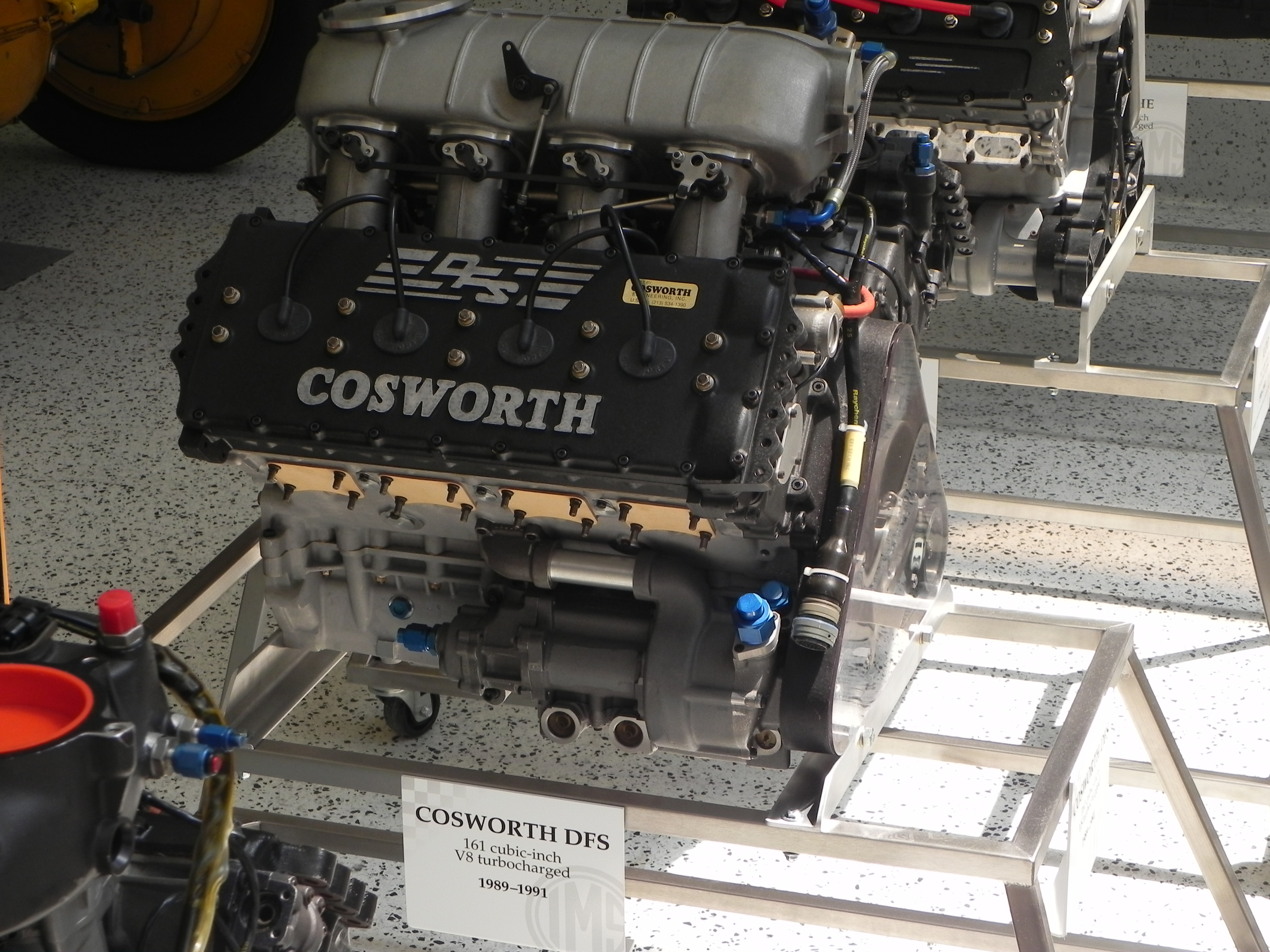
Cosworth DFS "short stroke" engine

Team and driver changes were highlighted by Bobby Rahal's departure from Truesports. For 1989, Rahal switched to the Maurice Kranes Kraco Racing Team (A year later, the team would merge with Galles). Rahal, along with Arie Luyendyk at Dick Simon Racing, fielded the new Cosworth DFS "short stroke", an updated version of the mainstay DFV. However, Rahal's DFS engine blew during Carburetion Day practice, and for race day the team would have to revert to a previous generation DFX.

Rookie Scott Pruett, the IMSA GTO and SCCA Trans-Am champion, moved to the Indy car ranks, and took over the vacated seat at Truesports. The team would continue to field the Judd powerplant. After a noteworthy 6th-place performance in the 1988 race, Jim Crawford was back at King Racing.

Chip Ganassi joined Pat Patrick as co-owner at Patrick Racing for Emerson Fittipaldi's #20 Marlboro entry. Speculation was emerging that Pat Patrick was planning to phase out his full-time ownership role, perhaps pursue a leadership position in CART, or even retire. Patrick himself mostly rebuffed the rumors, stating that bringing in Ganassi as an investor was merely a "business decision". Meanwhile, team sponsor Marlboro was nearing the end of their contract. Patrick was still in good standing with Ilmor, and would continue to field the Chevrolet engine. A multi-faceted "trade" deal between Patrick Racing and Penske Racing unfolded over a period of about two years, involving sponsors, drivers, and cars. For 1989, an agreement was reached whereby Marlboro would stay for another season at Patrick and Penske would supply Patrick with two PC-18 chassis for Fittipaldi. In return, Penske would receive interim Marlboro sponsorship to field a third car for Al Unser Sr. at the three 500-mile races in 1989 (Indianapolis, Michigan, and Pocono).

Newman Haas Racing also made headlines, expanding to a two-car team for 1989. Mario Andretti was joined by his son Michael to form a two-car Andretti effort. It was also Michael's first opportunity to compete with the Chevrolet engine. Michael had previously driven for the Kraco Racing Team.

Alfa Romeo joined the CART series with Alex Morales Motorsports in 1989. However, they were not yet ready to compete at Indianapolis. Their debut would actually come a couple weeks later at Detroit. As a result, driver Roberto Guerrero would miss the Indy 500 for the first time since he arrived as a rookie in 1984.

Absent from the race as a driver was Dick Simon, who retired at the end of the 1988 season. Simon had been a participant at Indy since 1970, but was still entered as owner of Dick Simon Racing.

== Race schedule ==
Race schedule – April/May, 1989
Sun	Mon	Tue	Wed	Thu	Fri	Sat
23	24	25	26	27	28; ROP	29; ROP
30; ROP	1	2	3	4	5	6 Practice
7 Practice	8 Practice	9 Practice	10; Practice	11; Practice	12; Practice	13; Time Trials
14; Time Trials	15; Practice	16; Practice	17; Practice	18; Practice	19; Practice	20; Time Trials
21; Time Trials	22	23	24	25; Carb Day	26; Mini-Marathon	27; Parade
28; Indy 500	29; Memorial Day	30	31			

Color	Notes
Green	Practice
Dark Blue	Time trials
Silver	Race day
Red	Rained out*
Blank	No track activity

* Includes days where track
activity was significantly
limited due to rain

ROP – denotes Rookie
Orientation Program

== Practice – week 1 ==
=== Saturday May 6 ===
Opening day was Saturday May 6. Only eleven cars took to the track on a cold 45 °F (7 °C) day, which saw snow flurries in the morning and the afternoon. Arie Luyendyk (213.657 mph (343.848 km/h)) led the speed chart for the day.

=== Sunday May 7 ===
Practice picked up on Sunday May 7, with 44 cars taking to the track. Emerson Fittipaldi (221.347 mph (356.223 km/h)) set the fastest lap of practice thus far. Michael Andretti was also over 220 mph (350 km/h).

=== Monday May 8 ===
Rick Mears set an all-time unofficial track record at 225.733 mph (363.282 km/h), the first ever practice lap over 225 mph (362 km/h) at the Speedway. His teammate Al Unser was close behind at 224.831 mph (361.830 km/h).

=== Tuesday May 9 ===
Rain washed out practice.

=== Wednesday May 10 ===
Rookie Steve Butler crashed in turn 4, suffering a broken collarbone, sidelining him for the month. The speeds were slightly down from Monday, with Al Unser topping the chart at 223.380 mph (359.495 km/h).

=== Thursday May 11 ===
At 4:11 p.m. on Thursday May 11, Danny Sullivan's car lost the engine cover, causing him to break into a 180° spin in turn three. The car hit the wall hard with the right side. Sullivan suffered a mild concussion and a fractured right arm. Sullivan would be forced to sit out the first weekend of time trials. High winds kept the speeds down, with Jim Crawford in a Buick V-6 (221.021 mph (355.699 km/h)) the best lap of the day.

=== Friday May 12 ===
Rick Mears blistered the track on the final day of practice before time trials. His lap of 226.231 mph (364.084 km/h) was the fastest practice lap ever run at the Speedway. Jim Crawford and Al Unser also topped 225 mph (362 km/h). Mears finished the week as the favorite for the pole position.

== Time trials – first weekend ==
=== Saturday May 13 ===
Pole day was scheduled for Saturday May 13. Rain, however, washed out the entire day. All time trial activities were postponed until Sunday.

=== Sunday May 14 – Pole day ===
On Sunday May 14, pole day time trials were held. Per USAC rules at the time, the cars would be allowed one trip through the qualifying draw order, and the pole round would be concluded. Al Unser Sr. drew first in line, and was the first driver to make an attempt. Unser set a track record on all four laps, and put himself on the provisional pole position with a track record run of 223.471 mph (359.642 km/h).

A busy hour of qualifying saw several cars complete runs. Scott Brayton, Scott Pruett, Bernard Jourdain, Teo Fabi, and Michael Andretti were among those who completed runs. Bobby Rahal and A. J. Foyt followed, and the field was already filled to eleven cars by 1:30 p.m.

At 2 p.m., Mario Andretti (220.486 mph (354.838 km/h)) tentatively put himself third. The next car out, however, was pole favorite Rick Mears. Mears set a one-lap track record of 224.254 mph (360.902 km/h), and a four-lap record of 223.885 mph (360.308 km/h) to secure the pole position. Minutes later, it was announced that Michael Andretti's car failed post-qualifying inspection. His run was disallowed as the car found to be 4.5 pounds underweight.

With Mears and Unser Sr. firmly holding the top two spots, the rest of the session focused on which driver would round out the front row in third starting position. Jim Crawford, in the Buick V-6, set a stock block track record of 221.450 mph (356.389 km/h) to sit in third at 2:40 p.m. Twenty minutes later, though, Emerson Fittipaldi took to the track, the final car eligible for the pole round. His run of 222.329 mph (357.804 km/h) put him on the outside of the front row, and bumped Crawford back to the inside of row two.

After the pole position round was settled, the "Second Day" of time trials commenced at 3:15 p.m. Second day qualifiers would line up behind the first day qualifiers. Michael Andretti re-qualified at 218.774 mph (352.083 km/h) (the 8th fastest car in the field), but was forced to start 22nd as a second-day qualifier. Andretti complained he could not get to the proper level of turbocharger boost due a possibly malfunctioning pop-off valve, but USAC took no action. Tom Sneva had an impressive first lap of 223.176 mph (359.167 km/h), but blew his engine before the run was completed. At the end of the day, the field was filled to 26 cars.

== Practice – week 2 ==
Practice during the second week was light, with many qualified drivers practicing in back-up cars. Most of the focus was on the non-qualified drivers, and the recovery status of Danny Sullivan. The Penske Team started preparing a back-up machine for Sullivan, with Geoff Brabham selected to shake the car down.

Danny Sullivan returned to the cockpit on Thursday May 18. He completed about 10-12 hot laps, with a top speed of 213.118 mph (342.980 km/h). Jim Crawford crashed his already-qualified car in turn 3. A suspension piece broke as he entered the turn, and the car spun into the outside wall. The team would repair the machine.

Rain washed out practice on "Fast" Friday May 19, the third day overall lost during the month.

== Time trials – second weekend ==
=== Third Day time trials – Saturday May 20 ===
On the third day of time trials, Danny Sullivan qualified comfortably at 216.027 mph (347.662 km/h). Sullivan was the fastest car of the day, followed by Kevin Cogan and Rocky Moran. Two crashes occurred during the day, involving Buddy Lazier and Steve Saleen. Neither would manage to qualify. At the end of the third day, the field was filled to 31 cars.

=== Bump Day time trials – Sunday May 21 ===
On Bump Day, much of the attention was focused on three-time Indy winner Johnny Rutherford, the biggest name who had not yet qualified. As the day opened, Billy Vukovich III (216.698 mph (348.742 km/h)) put his car in the field with an impressive run, ranked 16th-fastest overall. The second car to qualify was Johnny Rutherford, who completed his run at 213.097 mph (342.946 km/h). The field was now filled to 33 cars. Davy Jones (211.475 mph (340.336 km/h)) was the slowest car in the field, and now on the bubble.

John Paul Jr. bumped Davy Jones out of the field at 12:45 p.m. Paul was attempting to make a return to Indy after a four-year absence. His career was interrupted in 1986 when he was sentenced to five years in prison for his involvement in a drug trafficking ring with his father (John Paul Sr.) and subsequently refused to testify against him. He served a total of thirty months, being released in October 1988. Though tentatively in the field, Paul himself was now sitting on the bubble in 33rd at 211.969 mph (341.131 km/h).

The track activity went quiet during the heat of the afternoon. At 3 p.m., Davy Jones returned to the track and bumped his way back into the field with a run at 214.279 mph (344.849 km/h). That move put Phil Krueger (212.458 mph (341.918 km/h)) on the bubble. At 4:45 p.m., Pancho Carter bumped out Krueger. At that point, Johnny Rutherford (213.097 mph (342.946 km/h)) had now slipped down to the bubble spot.

Rutherford survived three attempts, and clung to the bubble spot nervously over the next hour. During that time, he put together a last-minute deal to step into a Foyt back-up car if necessary. He shook down the car with some practice laps, and appeared to be finding some speed. It was the second time in recent years that Rutherford was teaming up with Foyt on Bump Day. In 1984 Rutherford successfully bumped his way into the field with a Foyt backup car in the last ten minutes of time trials.

With fifteen minutes left in the day, Rich Vogler (213.239 mph (343.175 km/h)) bumped Johnny Rutherford from the field. Rutherford scrambled to get in line, and made it to the front with less than two minutes to spare. With the crowd cheering him on, at 5:58 p.m., Rutherford pulled out onto the track for one final attempt. He had a great warm-up lap of over 217 mph (349 km/h), but just after he took the green flag, his engine blew in turn one. Seconds later, the 6 o'clock gun went off. Rutherford failed to make the field for only the second time in his career. Rookie Bernard Jourdain held on to the final bubble spot, and the field was set.

== Carburetion Day ==
The final practice session was held Thursday May 25. Al Unser Sr. (217.407 mph) was the fastest driver of the day. No major incidents were reported. Jim Crawford's car was repaired and returned to the track after his crash the previous week. Bobby Rahal suffered engine issues, which cut his day short.

=== Pit Stop Contest ===
The semifinals and finals for the 13th annual Miller Pit Stop Contest were held on Thursday May 25. The top three race qualifiers and their respective pit crews were automatically eligible: Rick Mears, Al Unser Sr., Emerson Fittipaldi. However, Mears declined the invitation. Jim Crawford (who qualified 4th) took the empty spot. Al Unser Jr. secured the fourth and final spot in the contest during preliminaries which were on held on Wednesday May 17. Unser Jr. (13.618 seconds) defeated Bobby Rahal of KRACO Racing (24.432 seconds). Rahal suffered a 10-second penalty for running over an air hose. Mario Andretti also participated, but he was disqualified for running through the lights.

On the morning of Thursday May 18, a second round of preliminaries was held. Teo Fabi (16.286 seconds) was the fastest of the day, but was unable to top Unser Jr.'s time from Wednesday. Fabi was named the first alternate. Others included: Tom Sneva (17.082 seconds), A. J. Foyt (17.257 seconds), John Andretti (23.391 seconds), Pancho Carter (stalled), Michael Andretti (crew disqualified for pushing the car). King Racing withdrew from the contest after Jim Crawford crashed the team's primary car on the afternoon of May 18. Mario Andretti took Crawford's spot.

In the first semifinal, Al Unser Jr. defeated his father Al Unser Sr.. The Penske crew was issued two penalties, 10 seconds for running over a hose, and 5 additional seconds for a loose wheel. Mario Andretti defeated Emerson Fittipaldi in a close match in the second semifinal. In the final round, Al Unser Jr. of Galles Racing and led by chief mechanic Owen Snider, faced Mario Andretti of Newman/Haas Racing, led by chief mechanic Colin Duff. Unser defeated Andretti by over 6 seconds. Andretti was subsequently issued an additional 5-second penalty due to a loose wheel.

Semifinals
2	Al Unser Jr. (Galles Racing)	14.342
25	Al Unser Sr. (Penske Racing)	30.229
6	Mario Andretti (Newman/Haas Racing)	15.654
20	Emerson Fittipaldi (Patrick Racing)	14.626

Finals
2	Al Unser Jr. (Galles Racing)	14.716
6	Mario Andretti (Newman/Haas Racing)	26.582

== Starting grid ==
R = Indianapolis 500 rookie, W = Former Indianapolis 500 winner

Row	Inside		Middle		Outside	
1	4	(United States) Rick Mears W	25	(United States) Al Unser W	20	(Brazil) Emerson Fittipaldi
2	15	(United Kingdom) Jim Crawford	5	(United States) Mario Andretti W	22	(United States) Scott Brayton
3	18	(United States) Bobby Rahal W	2	(United States) Al Unser Jr.	30	(Brazil) Raul Boesel
4	14	(United States) A. J. Foyt W	28	(United States) Randy Lewis	70	(United States) John Andretti
5	8	(Italy) Teo Fabi	99	(United States) Gary Bettenhausen	9	(Netherlands) Arie Luyendyk
6	56	(Finland) Tero Palmroth	3	(United States) Scott Pruett R	71	(Canada) Ludwig Heimrath
7	12	(Belgium) Didier Theys R	69	(Mexico) Bernard Jourdain R	6	(United States) Michael Andretti
8	7	(United States) Tom Sneva W	91	(United States) Gordon Johncock W	10	(Republic of Ireland) Derek Daly
9	65	(Canada) John Jones R	1	(United States) Danny Sullivan W	11	(United States) Kevin Cogan
10	33	(United States) Rocky Moran	86	(United States) Dominic Dobson	81	(United States) Bill Vukovich III
11	50	(United States) Davy Jones	24	(United States) Pancho Carter	29	(United States) Rich Vogler

=== Alternates ===
- First alternate: Johnny Rutherford W (#98/#14T) – Bumped
- Second alternate: Phil Krueger (#77) – Bumped

=== Failed to Qualify ===
- John Paul Jr. (#39/#79/#97) – Bumped
- Michael Greenfield R (#17/#63) – failed to qualify; wave off
- Tony Bettenhausen Jr. (#17/#24) – failed to qualify; wave off
- Steve Butler R (#61) – crashed in practice
- Buddy Lazier R (#35) – crashed in practice
- Steve Saleen R (#59) – crashed in practice
- Johnny Parsons (#59/#69) – crashed in practice
- Scott Harrington R (#44) – practiced, did not attempt to qualify
- Tom Bigelow (#66) – practiced, did not attempt to qualify
- Stan Fox (#84) – practiced, did not attempt to qualify
- Steve Chassey (#79, #97) – practiced, did not attempt to qualify
- Dale Coyne R (#39) – practiced, did not attempt to qualify
- Dick Ferguson (#47) – did not take practice
- Bobby Olivero – unknown

== Race summary ==
=== Start ===
During one of the parade laps, veteran Gary Bettenhausen suffered a broken valve, and coasted to a stop on the mainstretch. He would be wheeled to the garage area without completing a single lap, and finished 33rd.

At the start, Emerson Fittipaldi jumped to the lead from the outside of the front row. He pulled out to a sizable lead over the first few laps. On the third lap, Kevin Cogan had a spectacular crash at the pit-entrance section of the front straightaway. His car made slight contact with the outside wall as he exited turn four, spun to the inside and made heavy contact with the inside pit wall. The car rebounded into the attenuating barrier at the pit entrance (also breaking the ABC Sports robo camera at the pit road entry), broke in two pieces, and slid on its side through the pits. The engine completely separated from the remains of the car and came to a stop in the pit area. Amazingly, Cogan climbed out unhurt.

=== Mid race ===
The race was dominated by Emerson Fittipaldi for the first 400 miles. During that stretch, several contenders retired due to mechanical failures, including all three Penske machines. Top-five contenders Bobby Rahal, Jim Crawford, and Arie Luyendyk also dropped out of the race. Mario Andretti experienced electrical problems, which caused him to lose significant ground to the leader. Michael Andretti, who had started in the seventh row, had been chasing Fittipaldi the entire race and by the 150-lap mark, he was within sights of the leader. Meanwhile, Al Unser Jr. remained on the lead lap in third place, despite being lapped earlier in the race. By this point, the three leaders had significant distance on the fourth place car of Raul Boesel. With less than 100 miles to go, Michael Andretti passed Fittipaldi for the lead, but his engine expired a few laps later. Fittipaldi regained the lead, with Al Unser Jr. second. The remainder of the field ran at least six laps behind.

A caution came out on lap 181 when Tero Palmroth lost a wheel in turn four. Leader Fittipaldi pitted for much-needed fuel, but he nearly stalled his engine as he pulled away. He lost several seconds on the stop, and was also blocked momentarily by a safety truck as he exited the pit area. Al Unser Jr. was running a distant second place, but the caution came partly to his advantage. On the previous rounds of pit stops, Unser Jr. had been experiencing slightly better fuel mileage than Fittipaldi. The team had been setting Unser up to potentially make it to the finish on one less pit stop than Fittipaldi. Under this late yellow, the team decided to gamble on track position, and Unser stayed out and did not to pit for fuel. Unser emerged just one car behind Fittipaldi. Team owner Rick Galles made the call not to pit – their fuel calculations were close enough that believed they could make it to the finish. Their reasoning was that even if Unser ran out of fuel on the final lap, they would still finish no worse than second since third place Raul Boesel was six laps behind.

=== Finish ===
When the race restarted on lap 186, Fittipaldi quickly built a 3-second lead while Unser struggled to get around the lapped car of Raul Boesel (3rd place). Boesel's car was spewing fluid, and appeared ready to blow. After clearing Boesel, Unser began closing dramatically. By lap 193 he was directly behind Fittipaldi, and a lap later he nearly touched wheels with him as the two drivers worked around the lapped cars of Derek Daly and Mario Andretti and battled for the lead. On lap 196, Unser passed Fittipaldi for the lead in turn three and began to pull away. Unser's light fuel load made him much faster on the straights but there was still considerable fear he might run out of fuel short of the finish line.

With two laps to go, Unser approached a line of slower cars consisting of Rocky Moran, Ludwig Heimrath Jr., Bernard Jourdain and John Jones. The two leaders were able to get around Moran easily in turn one, but Unser was held up behind Heimrath through turn two, allowing Fittipaldi to close in rapidly. On the backstretch, Fittipaldi pulled inside Unser, who then cut to the inside to pass Heimrath. Both cars ran side-by-side down the backstretch, going 3-wide to pass Jourdain on the inside as they entered turn 3. Unser remained on the racing line, with Fittipaldi down low on the warm-up apron. Near the apex of the corner, Fittipaldi's car oversteered and drifted slightly up the track, and the two cars touched wheels. Unser spun and crashed hard into the turn three wall, while Fittipaldi recovered from the drift and continued on. The yellow flag came out for the last lap with Fittpaldi leading, cruising around on his way to certain victory.

Unser emerged from his crashed car unhurt and stepped to the edge of the track to gesticulate at Fittipaldi as he drove by. According to Unser, at the last second he reconsidered and gave Fittipaldi a sporting thumbs-up instead, but some viewers interpreted his gesture as a mocking one. The pace car escorted the field around the final corner, and for the second year in a row, the race finished under caution. Emerson Fittipaldi took the checkered flag, his first of two Indy 500 victories. Despite the crash Unser was still credited with second place, having completed four more laps than Boesel in third. Boesel managed to nurse his failing motor to the checkered flag. The third place was his best Indy finish, and best finish to-date for Shierson Racing.

Fittipaldi's win was well received by the Indy car community. Fittipaldi also spoke, in his native Portuguese, a greeting to the people in Brazil in victory lane, to the thunderous roars of the crowd. Al Unser Jr., after being checked out and released from the track hospital, congratulated his adversary on the win, and rejected theories that Fittipaldi intentionally crashed him in response to their previous year's tangle at the Meadowlands.

== Box score ==
Finish	Start	No	Name	Qual	Team	Chassis	Engine	Laps	Status
1	3	20	(Brazil) Emerson Fittipaldi	222.329	Patrick Racing	Penske PC-18	Ilmor-Chevrolet	200	167.581 mph
2	8	2	(United States) Al Unser Jr.	218.642	Galles Racing	Lola T89/00	Ilmor-Chevrolet	198	Crash T3
3	9	30	(Brazil) Raul Boesel	218.228	Doug Shierson Racing	Lola T89/00	Judd AV	194	Flagged
4	5	5	(United States) Mario Andretti W	220.485	Newman/Haas Racing	Lola T89/00	Ilmor-Chevrolet	193	Flagged
5	10	14	(United States) A. J. Foyt W	217.135	A. J. Foyt Enterprises	Lola T89/00	Cosworth DFX	193	Flagged
6	6	22	(United States) Scott Brayton	220.458	Dick Simon Racing	Lola T89/00	Buick V-6	193	Flagged
7	31	50	(United States) Davy Jones	214.279	Euromotorsport	Lola T88/00	Cosworth DFX	192	Flagged
8	33	29	(United States) Rich Vogler	213.238	Machinists Union Racing	March 88C	Cosworth DFX	192	Flagged
9	20	69	(Mexico) Bernard Jourdain R	213.105	Andale Racing	Lola T89/00	Cosworth DFX	191	Flagged
10	17	3	(United States) Scott Pruett R	213.955	Truesports	Lola T89/00	Judd AV	190	Flagged
11	25	65	(Canada) John Jones R	214.028	Protofab Racing	Lola T89/00	Cosworth DFX	189	Flagged
12	30	81	(United States) Billy Vukovich III	216.698	Hemelgarn Racing	Lola T88/00	Judd AV	186	Flagged
13	18	71	(Canada) Ludwig Heimrath	213.878	Hemelgarn Racing	Lola T88/00	Judd AV	185	Flagged
14	28	33	(United States) Rocky Moran	214.212	A. J. Foyt Enterprises	March 86C	Cosworth DFX	181	Flagged
15	24	10	(Republic of Ireland) Derek Daly	214.237	Raynor Motorsports	Lola T89/00	Judd AV	167	Flagged
16	16	56	(Finland) Tero Palmroth	214.203	Gohr Racing	Lola T88/00	Cosworth DFX	165	Spindle
17	21	6	(United States) Michael Andretti	218.774	Newman/Haas Racing	Lola T89/00	Ilmor-Chevrolet	163	Engine
18	29	86	(United States) Dominic Dobson	213.590	Bayside Motorsports	Lola T88/00	Cosworth DFX	161	Engine
19	4	15	(United Kingdom) Jim Crawford	221.450	King Racing	Lola T87/00	Buick V-6	135	Drive Train
20	19	12	(Belgium) Didier Theys R	213.120	Arciero Racing	Penske PC-17	Cosworth DFX	131	Engine
21	15	9	(Netherlands) Arie Luyendyk	214.883	Dick Simon Racing	Lola T89/00	Cosworth DFS	123	Engine
22	32	24	(United States) Pancho Carter	214.067	Leader Card Racers	Lola T89/00	Cosworth DFX	121	Electrical
23	1	4	(United States) Rick Mears W	223.885	Penske Racing	Penske PC-18	Ilmor-Chevrolet	113	Engine
24	2	25	(United States) Al Unser W	223.471	Penske Racing	Penske PC-18	Ilmor-Chevrolet	68	Clutch
25	12	70	(United States) John Andretti	215.611	Vince Granatelli Racing	Lola T88/00	Buick V-6	61	Engine
26	7	18	(United States) Bobby Rahal W	219.530	Kraco Racing	Lola T89/00	Cosworth DFS	58	Valve
27	22	7	(United States) Tom Sneva W	218.396	Vince Granatelli Racing	Lola T88/00	Buick V-6	55	Pit Fire
28	26	1	(United States) Danny Sullivan W	216.027	Penske Racing	Penske PC-18	Ilmor-Chevrolet	41	Rear Axle
29	11	28	(United States) Randy Lewis	216.494	TeamKar International	Lola T89/00	Cosworth DFX	24	Wheel Bearing
30	13	8	(Italy) Teo Fabi	215.563	Porsche Motorsports	March 89P	Porsche	23	Ignition
31	23	91	(United States) Gordon Johncock W	215.072	Hemelgarn Racing	Lola T88/00	Buick V-6	19	Engine
32	27	11	(United States) Kevin Cogan	214.569	Machinists Union Racing	March 88C	Cosworth DFX	4	Crash FS
33	14	99	(United States) Gary Bettenhausen	215.230	Mann Motorsports	Lola T87/00	Buick V-6	0	Valve

W Former Indianapolis 500 winner

R Indianapolis 500 Rookie

All cars utilized Goodyear tires.

=== Race statistics ===
Lap Leaders
Laps	Leader
1–34	Emerson Fittipaldi
35	Mario Andretti
36	Raul Boesel
37–87	Emerson Fittipaldi
88–92	Michael Andretti
93–112	Emerson Fittipaldi
113–123	Michael Andretti
124–129	Emerson Fittipaldi
130–139	Michael Andretti
140–153	Emerson Fittipaldi
154–162	Michael Andretti
163	Emerson Fittipaldi
164–165	Al Unser Jr.
166–195	Emerson Fittipaldi
196–198	Al Unser Jr.
199–200	Emerson Fittipaldi

Total laps led
Driver	Laps
Emerson Fittipaldi	158
Michael Andretti	35
Al Unser Jr.	5
Mario Andretti	1
Raul Boesel	1

Cautions: 7 for 43 laps
Laps	Reason
5–14	Kevin Cogan crash in turn 4
61–65	Bobby Rahal stalled on track
128–131	Arie Luyendyk blown engine
139–149	Jim Crawford stalled on track
162–166	Michael Andretti blown engine
181–186	Tero Palmroth lost wheel in turn 4
199–200	Al Unser Jr. crash in turn 3

== Broadcasting ==
=== Radio ===
The race was carried live on the IMS Radio Network. Lou Palmer served as the chief announcer for the second and final time. It would be Palmer's 32nd and final 500 as part of the radio crew. Bob Forbes reported from victory lane.

One of the more significant changes involved Howdy Bell, now becoming the "elder statesman" of the crew. After many years in turn two, then one year as a pit reporter, Bell revived the backstretch reporting location. Bell was utilized sparingly, mostly for observations and brief commentary. The on-air "Statistician" duty was eliminated for 1989. This would be Bob Lamey's last year in turn two, and Bob Jenkins' final year as the radio reporter in turn four.

The biggest departure for 1989 was that of Luke Walton, who had joined the crew in 1953. Walton was a pit reporter from 1953 to 1982. Then from 1983 to 1988, he reprised his traditional role of introducing the starting command during the pre-race ceremonies; but he did not have an active role during the race itself. Pit reporter Gary Gerould took over the duty of introducing the starting command, but it would be the final time that was done on the radio broadcast. Starting in 1990, the radio would instead simulcast the public address system during the pre-race ceremonies. This was Gerould's last year on the radio broadcast. He would work the television broadcast starting in 1990. In addition, Chuck Marlowe switched from pit reporter to the garage area duties.

Three-time Indy 500 winner Johnny Rutherford failed to qualify for the race, and joined the crew on race day as "driver expert". Since Rutherford never again qualified for the race (and subsequently retired in 1994), he went on to become a long-time fixture on the broadcast. The 1989 race began what would be a 14-year run for Rutherford as the resident "driver expert".

After the race, during the off-season, the Speedway and Lou Palmer parted ways. A new Voice of the 500 would debut in 1990, along with many other changes.

Indianapolis Motor Speedway Radio Network
Booth Announcers	Turn Reporters	Pit/garage reporters
Chief Announcer: Lou Palmer; Driver expert: Johnny Rutherford; Historian: Donald Davidson	Turn 1: Jerry Baker; Turn 2: Bob Lamey; Backstretch: Howdy Bell; Turn 3: Larry Henry; Turn 4: Bob Jenkins	Ron Carrell (north pits); Bob Forbes (north-center); Sally Larvick (south-center pits); Gary Gerould (south pits); Chuck Marlowe (garages)

=== Television ===
The race was carried live flag-to-flag coverage in the United States on ABC Sports. The 1989 race celebrated the 25th year of the Indy 500 on ABC. Paul Page served as host and play-by-play announcer, accompanied by Bobby Unser and Sam Posey. At the start of the race, Unser drove the pace car, and reported live from the car during the pace laps.

Pit reporters Jack Arute and Brian Hammons were joined by Dr. Jerry Punch, who appeared at Indy for the first time.

The telecast would go on to win the Sports Emmy award for "Outstanding Live Sports Special."

ABC Television
Booth Announcers	Pit/garage reporters
Host/Announcer: Paul Page; Color: Sam Posey; Color: Bobby Unser	Jack Arute; Brian Hammons; Dr. Jerry Punch

== 1988–89 USAC Gold Crown Championship ==
1988–89 USAC Championship Car season
- USAC Gold Crown Championship

Season
- Races: 1

Awards
- National champion: (Brazil) Emerson Fittipaldi

The 1988–89 USAC Gold Crown Championship season consisted of one sanctioned race. The schedule was based on a split-calendar, beginning in June 1988 and running through May 1989. Starting in 1981, USAC scaled back their participation in top-level Indy car racing, and ultimately ceased sanctioning races outside of the Indianapolis 500 following their 1983–84 season. Subsequently, the Gold Crown Championship would consist of only one event annually; the winner of the Indianapolis 500 would be the de facto Gold Crown champion, as it was their lone points-paying event. The preeminent national championship season was instead sanctioned by CART, and the Indy 500 paid championship points separately (on a different scale) toward the CART championship as well.

Emerson Fittipaldi, by virtue of winning the 1989 Indianapolis 500, also won the 1988–89 USAC Championship.

=== Final points standings (Top five) ===
Pos	Driver	INDY (United States)	Pts
1	(Brazil) Emerson Fittipaldi	1	1000
2	(United States) Al Unser Jr.	2	800
3	(Brazil) Raul Boesel	3	700
4	(United States) Mario Andretti	4	600
5	(United States) A. J. Foyt	5	500

== Selected rules and specifications ==
Engine regulations
Engine Type	Maximum Displacement	Turbocharger Boost
Turbocharged DOHC V-8	161.7 cu in (2.65 L)	45 inHg (1,500 mbar)
Turbocharged Stock Block V-6	209.3 cu in (3.43 L)	55 inHg (1,900 mbar)
Normally aspriated OHC	274.6 cu in (4.50 L)	—
Normally aspriated Stock Block	355.1 cu in (5.82 L)	—
Fuel	On-board capacity	Total allotment
Methanol	40 US gal (151.4 L)	280 US gal (1,100 L)

Rookie Test
Phase	Laps	Speed bracket
1	10	180–185 mph
2	10	185–190 mph
3*	10	190–195 mph
4*	10	195–200 mph

*Veteran Refresher tests consisted of Phases 3–4 of the rookie test.

== Gallery ==
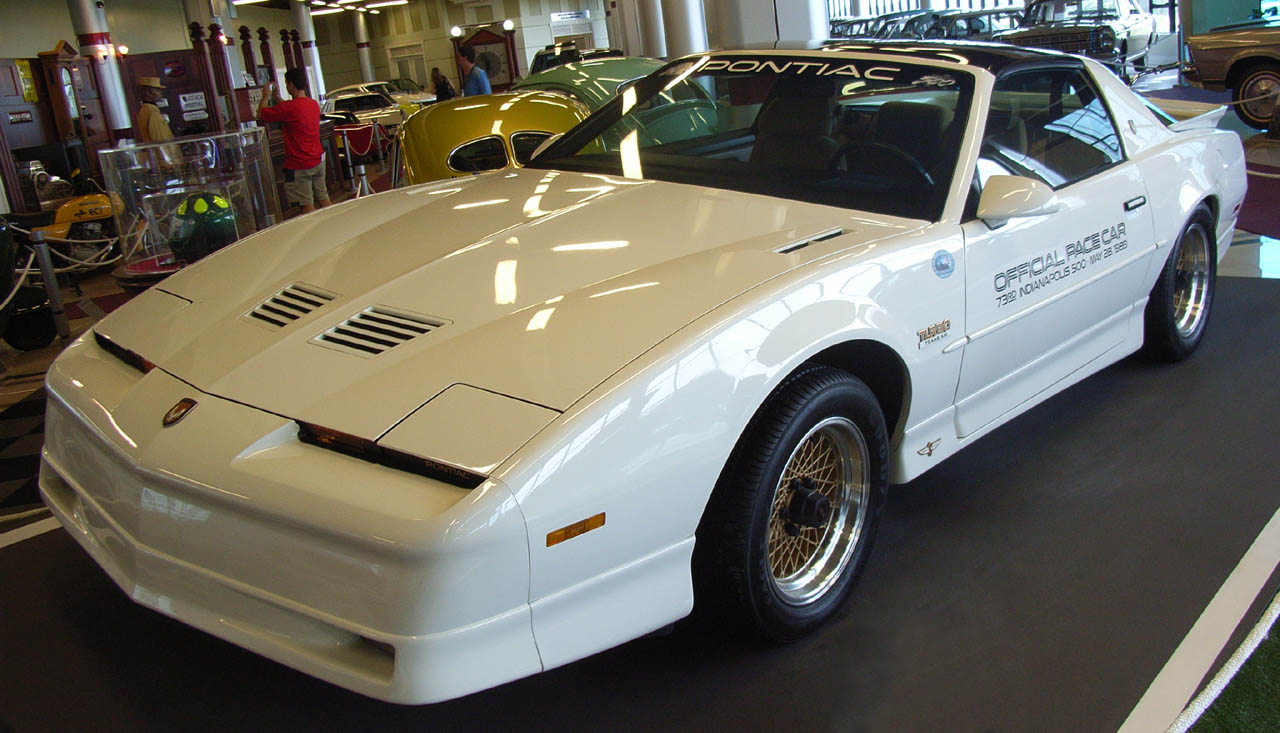
1989 Pontiac Trans Am pace car

== Notes ==
=== Works cited ===
- 1989 Indianapolis 500 Day-By-Day Trackside Report For the Media
- Indianapolis 500 History: Race & All-Time Stats – Official Site
- 1989 Indianapolis 500 Radio Broadcast, Indianapolis Motor Speedway Radio Network

=== External links ===
- Gallery of photos from the event, official website of the Indianapolis 500
- Part 6: 1989 – Winning major prizes on the road to losing everything

1988 Indianapolis 500; Rick Mears	1989 Indianapolis 500; Emerson Fittipaldi	1990 Indianapolis 500; Arie Luyendyk
