= Steve Butler =

American racing driver

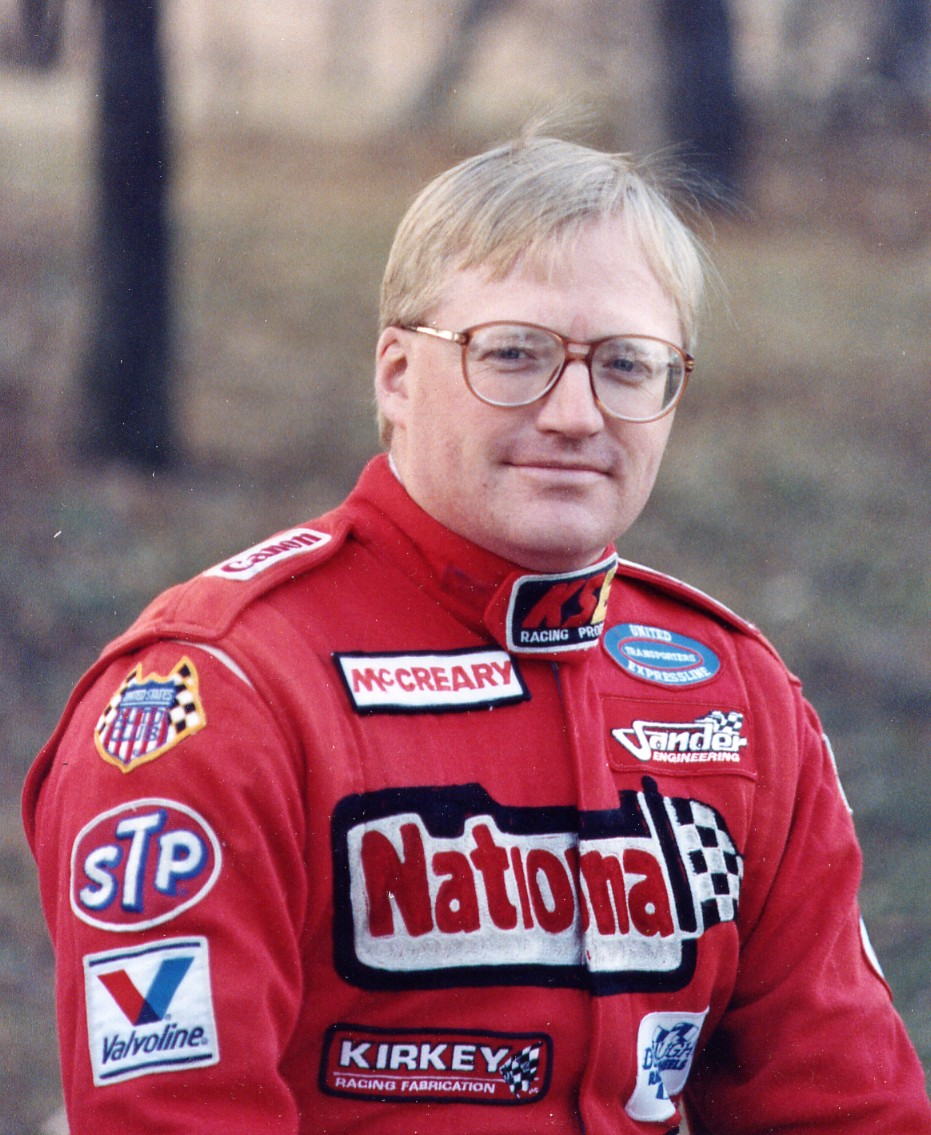
- Butler during his final racing season
- Nationality: American
- Born: September 26, 1956 (age 70) Amarillo, Texas, U.S.
- Retired: 1993
- Debut season: 1984

USAC National Championship Series
- Years active: 10

Championship titles
- 1992 1990 1988 1988 1987 1986: USAC Silver Crown Champion; USAC Sprint Car Champion; USAC Silver Crown Champion; USAC Sprint Car Champion; USAC Sprint Car Champion; USAC Sprint Car Champion

Awards
- 2018 2016 2006 2005 2004 2004 1993 1990 1990 1988 1988 1988 1987 1986 1985 1983 1983 1978 1976: Indy 500 Museum; USAC Hall of Fame; Eldora 4-Crown Silver Anniversary; National Sprint Car Hall of Fame; USAC Life-Time Performance; Howard Co. Sports Hall of Fame; HARF Racing Hall of Fame; USAC Meritorious Achievement; BARC Driver of the Year; Honorary Key To Indianapolis; USAC Pavement Sprint Champ; Kentucky Colonel Commission; HARF Driver of the Year; Indiana Tri-Track Champion; USAC Rookie of Year; Paragon Sprint Champion; HARF Most Improved Driver; AMA Pro Dirt Track Winner; AMA D15 250A Motorcycle Champ

Steve Butler (born September 26, 1956) is an American former auto racing driver. He won six national driving championships in USAC Sprint Car and Silver Crown open-wheel racing. Butler was highly regarded for his technical skills and performed chief mechanic duties on several of his winning race cars. He also communicated his view of racing to fans both as author and television commentator. Despite a relatively brief racing career (1981–1993), Butler is an inductee into the National Sprint Car Hall of Fame, the USAC Hall of Fame, and the Hoosier Auto Racing Fan's Hall of Fame. He retired at the age of 37 to pursue both an engineering career and more time with his growing family. Butler currently resides in Kokomo, IN.

== United States Auto Club records ==
In 1990, Butler became the first four-time Sprint Car National Champion in the 34-year history of the United States Automobile Club. USAC Butler won USAC sprint car races on pavement, dirt, and on dirt with wings. He is the only driver to win in all of these categories during a single USAC season. In addition to his Sprint Car championships, Butler won two championships in USAC's Silver Crown division. Winning six national championships places Butler in the top-tier of all-time USAC driving champions. This distinction includes all championships in any of USAC's national championship racing divisions including IndyCar, Silver Crown Car, Sprint Car, Midget, and Stock Car.

== Early life ==
Butler was born to parents Bruce and Sharon Butler and has three sisters Linda, Laura, and Melanie. Due to Bruce's career as an USAF pilot, the family lived in England for four years shortly after Steve's birth.

Bruce loved all things mechanical—especially those that involve speed. He repaired and modified cars in his free time and also owned a go-kart that he drove on remote parts of the British aircraft parking ramps, often allowing young Steve to ride in his lap.

Shortly after the family returned from England, Bruce was killed in an airplane crash. At the time, Butler was six years old but had already caught his father's enthusiasm for cars and airplanes. Butler set out to learn as much as possible about these mechanical wonders without benefit of his father's tutelage. By the age of 14, he had disassembled and rebuilt the family car and became known as the neighborhood "motor-head."

By the age of 20, Butler was a full-time student in the Flight Technology school at Vincennes University. Planning to become a pilot, he had earned his commercial pilot license and had distinguished himself by winning the school's "Top Aerobatic Pilot" award. However, he left school early to launch his professional motorcycle racing career. He was anxious to get serious about racing and was concerned that he was already four years older than most of his professional motorcycle racing peers.

== Racing career ==
=== Motorcycle racing ===
Butler launched his amateur bike racing career upon graduating from high school. His first opportunity came when a buddy agreed to let him race an old bike under a lease/purchase agreement. This involved Steve paying $25/week for the machine with earnings from flipping hamburgers after school.

Realizing that his meager budget was insufficient to race competitively, Butler prevailed upon a friend to provide (free) transport to/from the races. This allowed Steve to buy tires and other racing essentials. The strategy worked and allowed Butler to begin winning races.

In 1976, Butler was able to win the AMA District 15 (Indiana) ½ Mile Flat Track Championship which convinced him to advance to professional motorcycle racing. However, in his first pro season Butler was severely injured during a race at the Onekama, MI ½ mile dirt track. He remained in the hospital for 30 days and spent nine months recovering from his injuries. This was the fourth time in four years that he found himself recovering from fractured bones resulting from motorcycle racing.

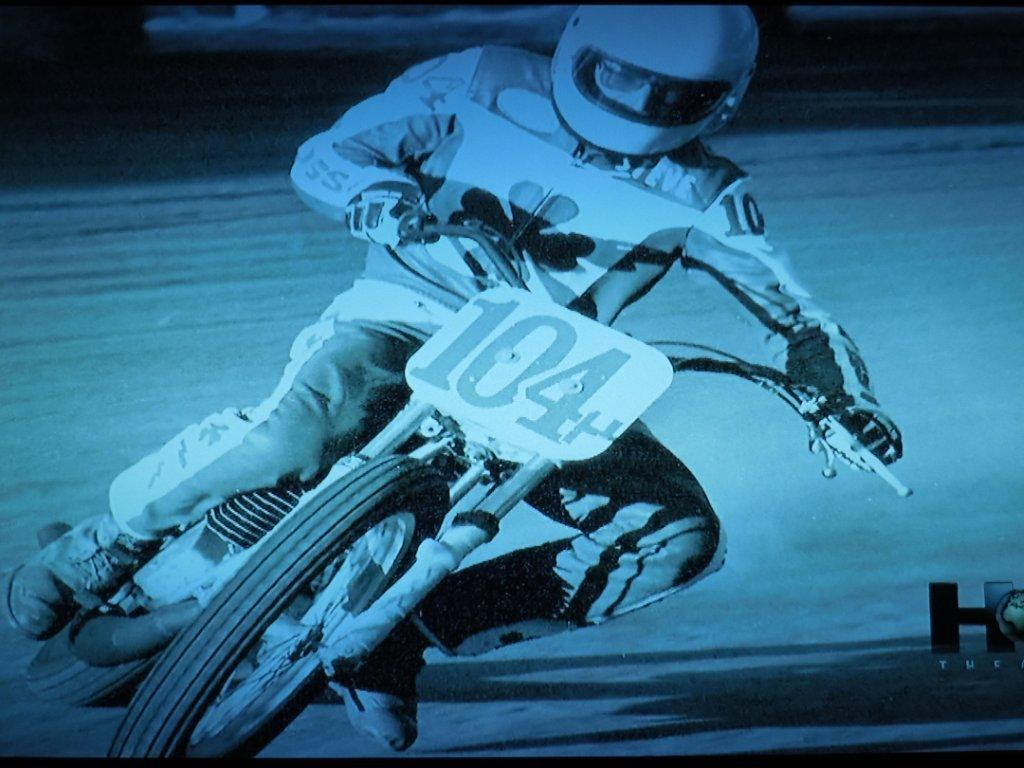
Butler rides to a win in a 1978 pro flat track race at the Greenville (OH) ½ mile

In 1978, Butler rebounded from his injuries by winning a pro race at Beaver Dam, WI—his very first event after recovering from the Onekama crash. More than 20 years later, Butler's exploits are recalled in a 2001 Cycle News article featuring racers successful in both motorcycle and automobile racing. This piece placed Butler on a short-list of motorcycle/car racers that included legends such as Joe Leonard, Swede Savage, and Steve Morehead

Butler began 1979 aboard a Harley-Davidson XR-750—famous for both its performance and high maintenance costs. Unfortunately, these costs became prohibitive and Butler had to stop racing mid-season due to insufficient finances. At this point, he began attending local sprint car races and became inspired to abandon the unreliable Harley for a new kind of racer.

=== Early sprint cars ===
If Butler's motorcycle racing was conducted on a "shoe-string" budget, his entry into Sprint Car racing was seemingly hopeless—he was attempting to enter an advanced class of auto racing with no money and no prior auto racing experience. He was also nearly 25 years old and the sport was tilting towards very young drivers; in just a few years Jeff Gordon would begin his own sprint car career at the age of 13. Undaunted, Butler jumped in with both feet by selling all of his race bikes and his transport van (his only personal transportation). When liquidating his assets was insufficient to buy a sprint car, he convinced his future wife, Thomasa Brock, to help him obtain a loan using her own home as collateral. This provided enough money to buy a beat-up old Sprint Car.

Butler spent the winter of 1980–81 rebuilding the crashed and worn-out car in his mom's garage, using only hand tools and a gas-welding rig. The lack of sophisticated tools made this work very labor-intensive. Butler relied on a dedicated group of friends who volunteered to provide the labor and skills necessary to get the fabrication work done. Steve planned the overall design, performed the engine building, and participated in the fabrication work.

As the 1981 season opened, Butler was pouring all available money into the race car and was still without street wheels of any sort. Once again, a friend came to the rescue by offering to tow the race car. Despite these financial problems, Butler was able to win his very first (heat) race. This quick success led to Butler's first big break when Ezra Beachy, a local engine shop owner, offered Butler an engine sponsorship

Although the Beachy engine sponsorship was very exciting, Butler's immediate problem was that he was rapidly running out of the money needed for essentials such as race tires and fuel. After only three weeks of racing, it was now uncertain if the team could even make the next race, let alone a full season. The atmosphere was gloomy, within Mom Butler's garage/race shop, when a newspaper delivery kid mentioned that one of his customers was a race fan. Butler immediately followed-up on this tip by arranging to meet with Bud Whitacre, a local supermarket owner. This led to $500 for a new set of tires and the beginning of a lifelong relationship.

In January 1983, Butler began the year by marrying Thomasa. Unfortunately, the couple could not yet afford a honey-moon. This problem was solved, later that year, when Butler won the 1983 Paragon Speedway track championship. Instead of a trophy, track promoter Mike Johnson supplied the couple with a trip to the Bahamas which became their belated honey-moon trip.

=== United States Auto Club Racing ===
==== Debut ====
In 1982, Butler's first USAC appearance was dramatic. On his first qualifying lap, still driving his original home-built race car, Butler set a new track record at Bloomington, IN; on the second lap he flipped out of the track. Steve did return to race six USAC races in 1983, posting top-three finishes in half of these. However, his primary focus was on winning the 1983 Paragon track championship.

===== 1984 =====
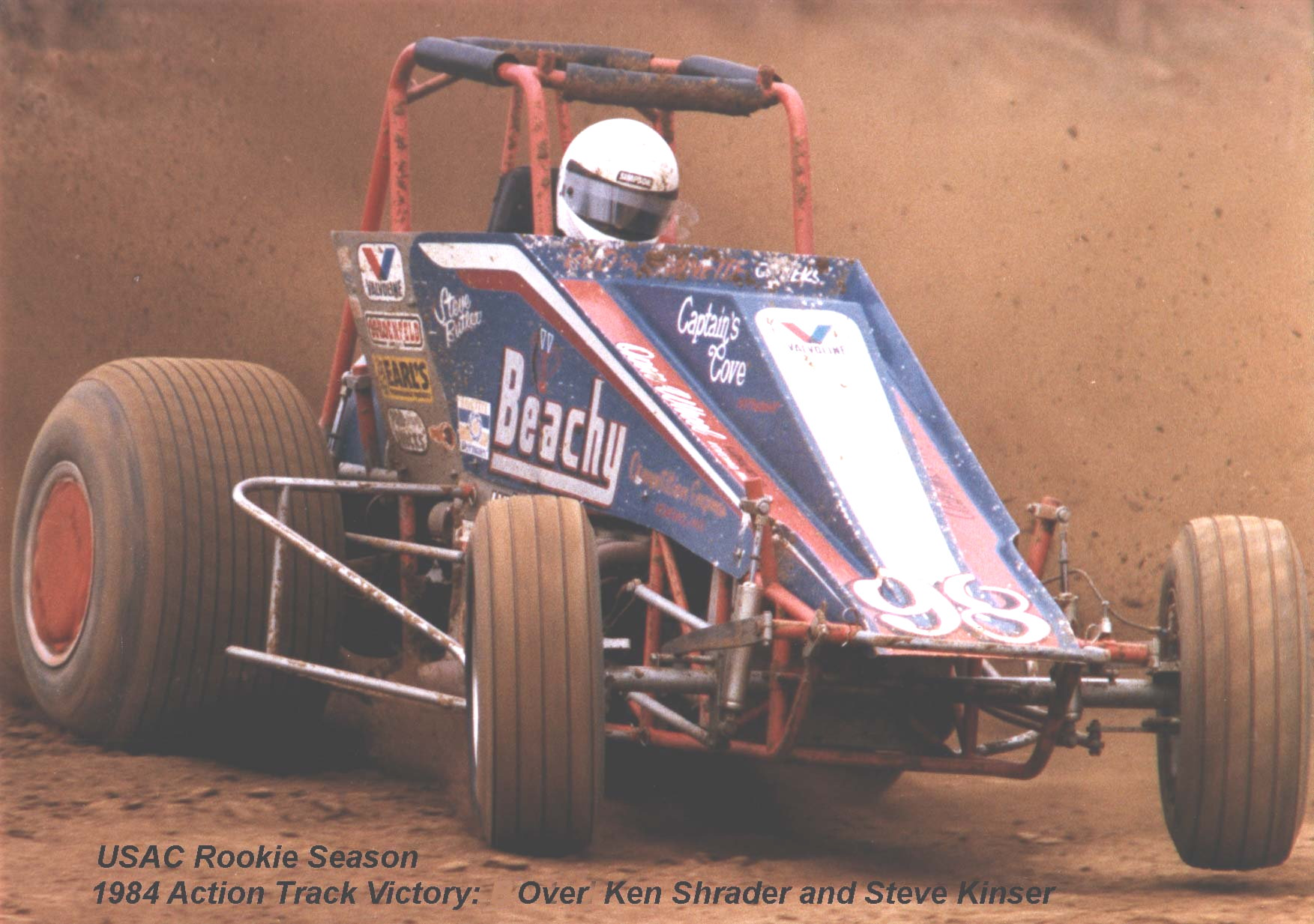
During his rookie USAC season, Butler delivers an upset win over Steve Kinser and Ken Schrader at Terre Haute, Indiana

Butler mounted his first effort to campaign the full USAC Sprint Car series in 1984. He quickly seized national attention by winning his first USAC race on live television. The Jud Larson/Don Branson memorial, held on the high-banked ½ mile at Eldora Speedway, was broadcast on ABC's Wide World of Sports. The win was unexpected, as Butler started 10th behind formidable veterans such as Jack Hewitt, Sheldon Kinser, and Rickey Hood. However, Butler quickly moved through the field to take the lead from Hewitt on the 16th lap to claim his first USAC victory.

In June, Steve and Thomasa became parents with the birth of Jennifer. Just two days later, Butler won the annual Kokomo Classic race with both his wife and newborn daughter in attendance.

By the end of the year, Butler had won five USAC sprint races, one less than eventual series champion Rickey Hood. The most impressive of these was at the flat Terre Haute Action Track ½ mile; Butler started seventh and then drove past visiting champions Ken Schrader (defending USAC champ) and Steve Kinser (defending World of Outlaws champ) to earn the win. Butler went on to finish the season third in USAC points.

===== 1985 =====
In February, Butler started the 1985 season driving in Phoenix (AZ) in a locally owned car. In April, as the Midwest Spring began, he was back in the Whitacre/Beachy sprint car. However, by the end of the year, he had driven for at least nine different race teams and had advanced to second in the USAC sprint championship standings.

In August, Butler hooked-up with Phil Poor, who had just purchased his first sprint car by way of a bargain-priced package. This deal included the car, engine, spares, transport trailer, and even a rusted out Chevy Suburban tow vehicle. Butler and Poor began to win races with the old sprint car even though it had been cast aside—as uncompetitive—by its previous owner. In response, Poor named the under-appreciated car "Ol' Whitey." This little team was the genesis for many years of racing success, as Butler and Poor went on to win four USAC titles together.

Late in the season, Butler joined with the Jarrett racing team to compete in the Springfield Silver Crown race, finishing in the top ten. The new team then finished second in the annual Hoosier Hundred at Indianapolis, nearly winning the race. These performances earned Butler the title of 1985 USAC Silver Crown Rookie of the Year.

==== Championship Years ====
===== 1986 =====
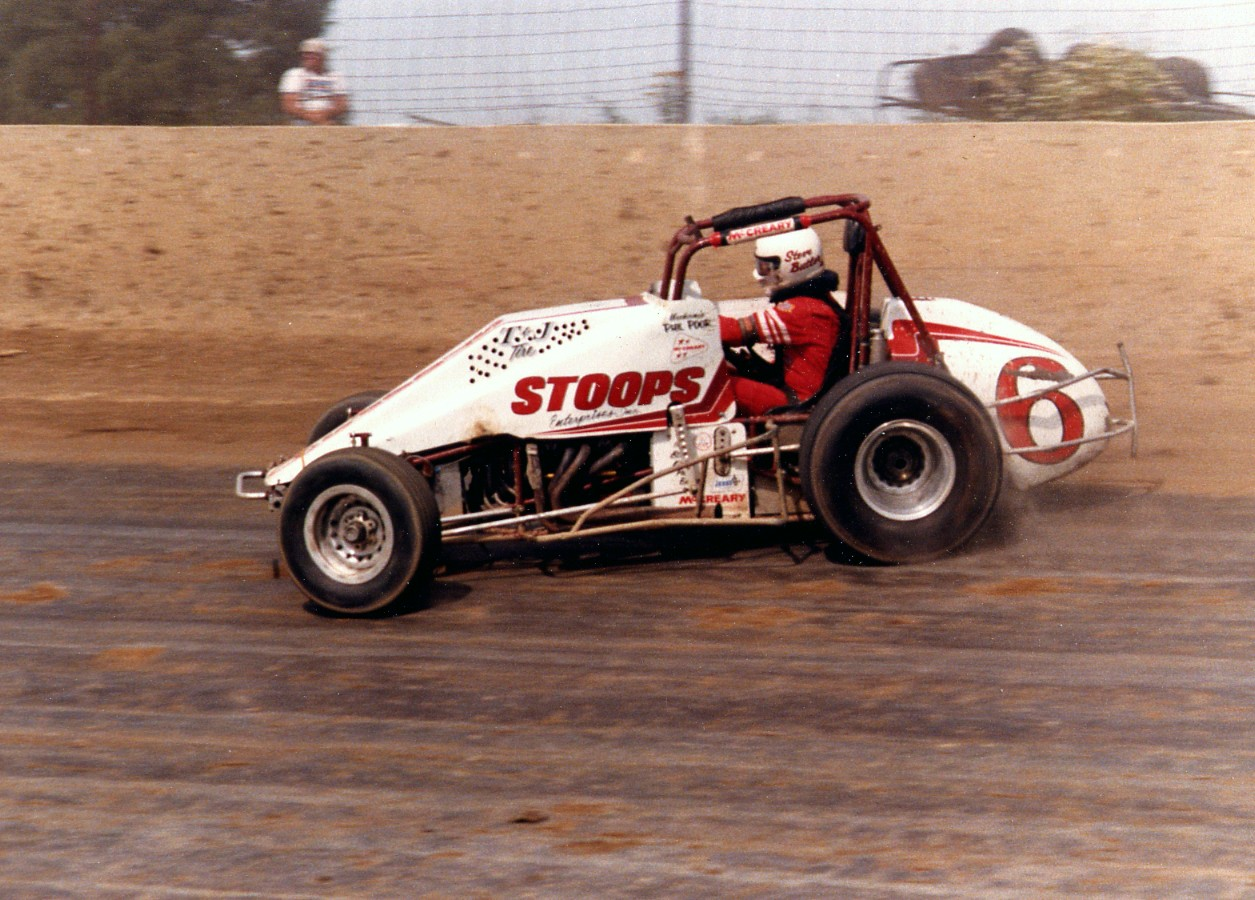
Butler and Ol' Whitey ride Eldora's cushion to their first USAC championship.

In 1986, Ol' Whitey returned as the centerpiece of Phil Poor's small race team. With new sponsorship from Jeff Stoops, Butler drove the car to a racing season. They won USAC races, AllStar Circuit of Champions races and posted some top-five World of Outlaws finishes. The team also won many non-sanctioned races including the Indiana Sprint Week championship. In September, Butler capped-off the year by winning the USAC Sprint Championship.

Butler continued to improve in the Silver Crown series and advanced to second in the 1986 championship standings. At Indianapolis Raceway Park, Steve impressed the racing fraternity by nearly winning in his very first attempt to race on pavement. Butler started in 16th and then proceeded to drive into the lead, passing NASCAR and Indy 500 competitors such as Ken Schrader, Gary Bettenhausen, and Rich Vogler. Although tire problems dropped him to second at the finish, Butler's race-leading performance had grabbed attention.

Butler finished the season with a win at Gas City, Indiana. This win came the day after Austin, his new son, was born. As with Jennifer's birth, the Butler's celebrated their new child with a race win.

===== 1987 =====
In 1987, the team debuted with brand new equipment as Jeff Stoops supplied the resources to create a truly professional class race team. The team continued its practice of running a variety of races, while concentrating on the USAC Sprint series. A highlight of the year was winning the Tony Hulman classic at Terre Haute Action Track Butler went on to claim his second straight USAC Sprint Championship and was awarded "Driver of the Year" by the Hoosier Auto Racing Fan club.

In the Silver Crown series standings Butler had a strong run and scored top-five finishes in over half the races. He also continued to show potential as a pavement racer, by finishing top-three at both Indianapolis Raceway Park and Phoenix International Raceway. However, in the point standings he was, for the second year in a row, second behind the tough Jack Hewitt.

===== 1988 =====
In 1988, Butler became the first driver to win three consecutive USAC sprint championships. Two of these were during a brief period (1987–1990) in which USAC added winged dirt races to the traditional mix of pavement and dirt non-winged races. This new challenge provided Steve a chance to demonstrate his versatility by winning all three types of races during the 1988 season.

Eldora Speedway was the site of great dirt wins. In July, Butler won a USAC winged-sprint race at the track. Visiting World of Outlaws stars such as Jac Haudenschild, Jimmy Sills, and Brad Doty made this an especially tough win. These drivers were using the USAC race to prepare for Eldora's King's Royal, the track's premier winged-sprint car race, scheduled the following weekend. A few months later, Butler also won Eldora's most prestigious non-wing sprint race—the annual USAC Four-Crown National.

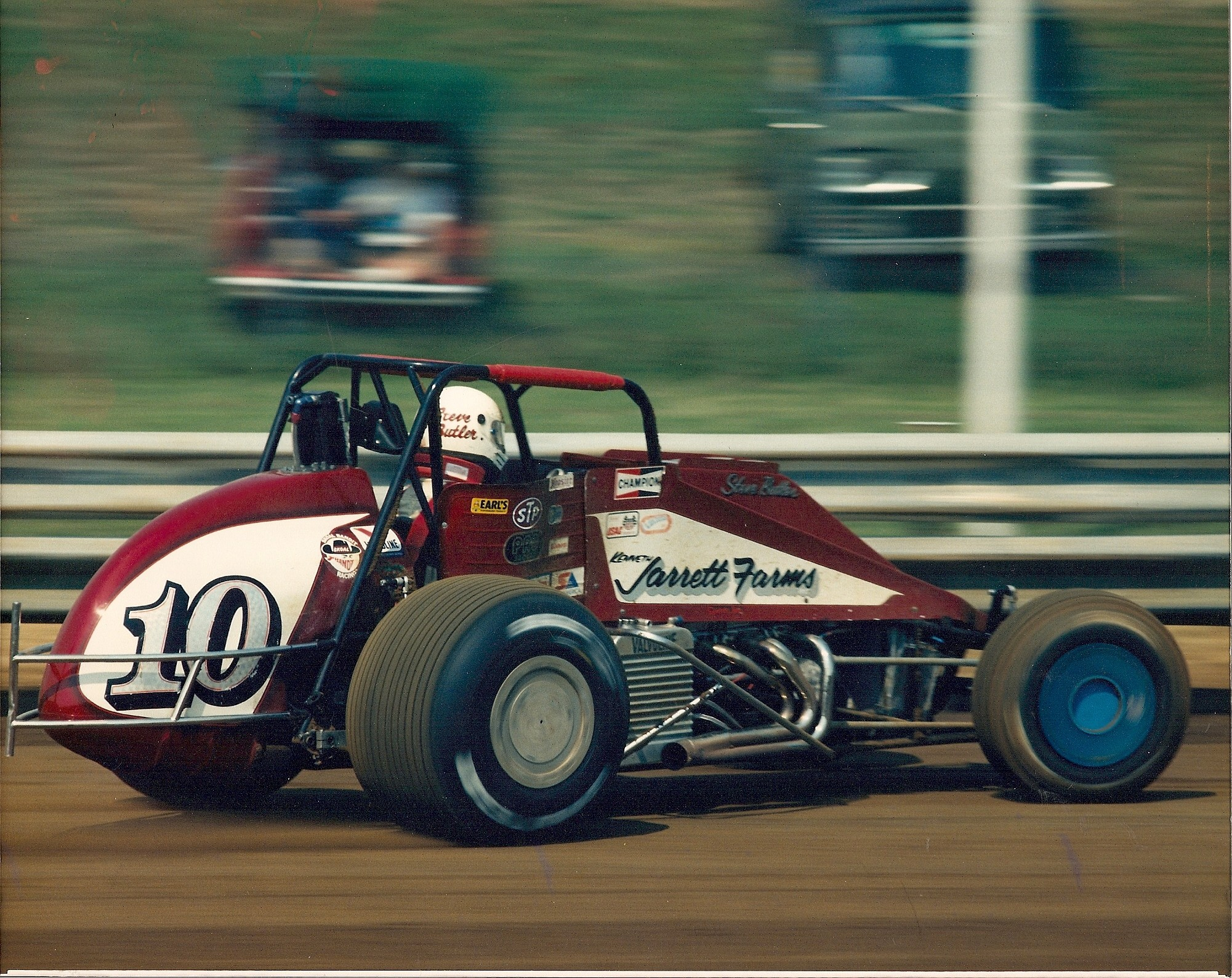
Butler on the gas at the 1988 Springfield Mile en route to his first Silver Crown championship.

The highlight of Butler's season was his dominance of the new pavement races at Indianapolis Raceway Park where he won on ESPN television and was fastest at the races that he did not win outright (due to mechanical misfortune). In the process, Butler pioneered a new style of passing on the banked oval. His spectacular maneuver was dubbed "The Butler Grass-Cutter Move" by ESPN announcers Larry Nuber and Steve Chassey. Twenty years later, this technique was cited as an influence by NASCAR star Jason Leffler after his win in the 2007 Kroger 200 at ORP.

In the Silver Crown series, Butler finally defeated Jack Hewitt to win the championship. This achievement highlighted Butler's technical capabilities as he was chief mechanic, as well as driver, on the winning Jarrett Farms race car.

===== 1989 =====
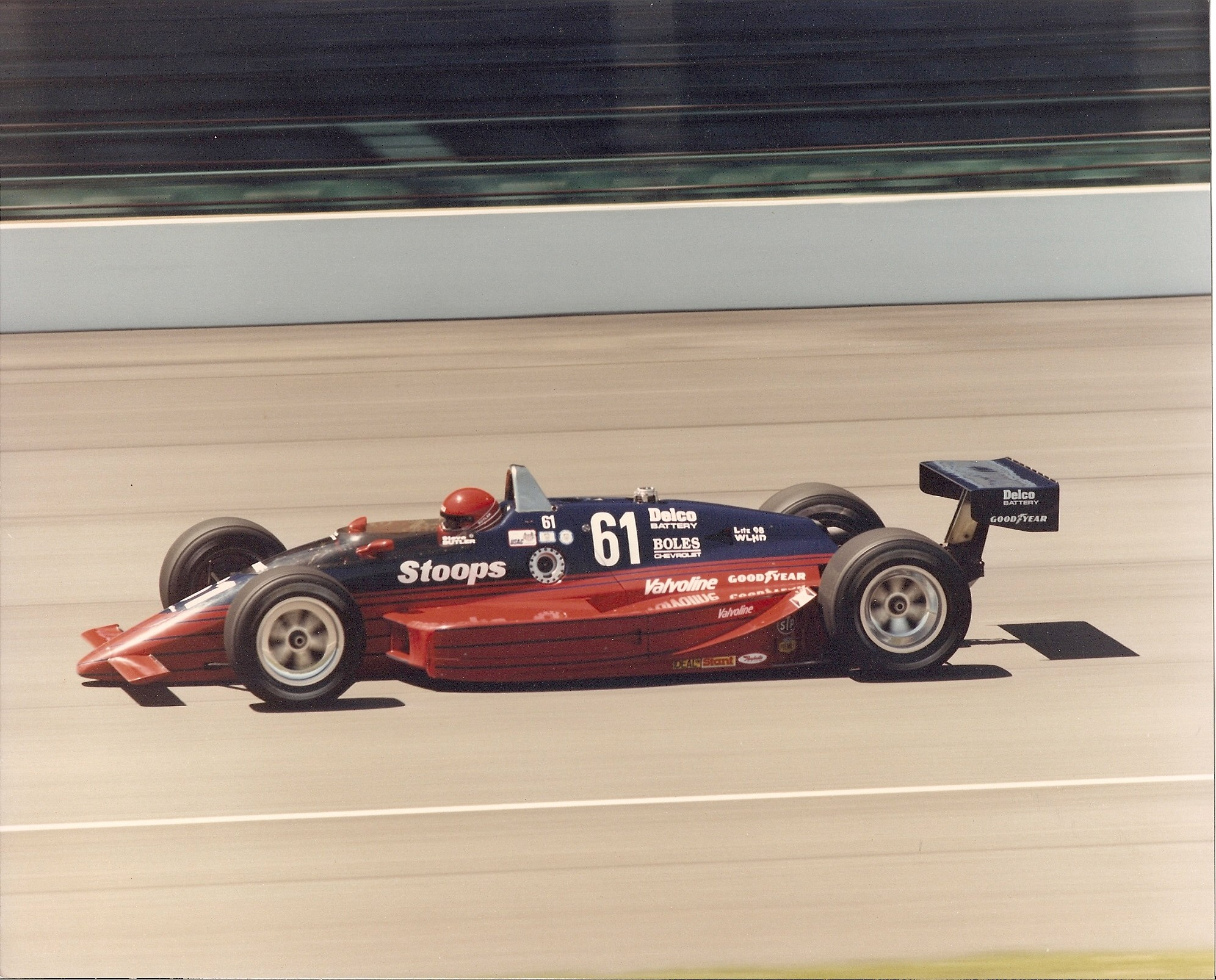
In his only Indy Car appearance Butler showed impressive speed until a crash destroyed the car and broke his shoulder.

Butler did not defend his USAC titles in 1989 due to his bid to enter Indy Car racing and compete in the Indianapolis 500. Driving a Jeff Stoops-owned Lola/Cosworth, Butler established himself as a top rookie contender by posting the fastest speed (214.246 mph) achieved during the mandatory rookie orientation testing. At the conclusion of the second day of official race practice, Butler was surprised to find himself with speeds among the top veteran drivers. This performance generated considerable excitement, given that Butler had never before raced an Indy Car and was considered a "dirt track" racer. Unfortunately, Butler's fortunes reversed quickly when he crashed heavily, destroyed the car, and suffered a broken right shoulder.

In June, after recovering from the broken shoulder, Butler returned to sprint car racing and soon resumed winning races. Unfortunately, in August he was again injured, this time breaking his left shoulder in a sprint car accident. However, Butler missed only one race weekend during his recovery. He made good use of the break by joining Larry Nuber, in the ESPN TV announcer's booth, to call the USAC sprint car action at Indianapolis Raceway Park.

===== 1990 =====
In 1990, Steve returned to USAC racing full-time trying for a record fourth USAC Sprint Car championship. He began the season driving the Aristocrat #2 and won two races, including another ESPN television race at Winchester Speedway. At mid-season he changed rides to the Hoffman #69. The team enjoyed quick success, setting fast qualifying time six-times and setting track records and winning races. This performance secured the USAC Sprint Car championship.

The highlight of Butler's Silver Crown season was a dramatic win at Eldora Speedway, where he narrowly defeated Jack Hewitt. The pair battled the entire race, exchanging the lead many times. Their duel set a blistering pace and forced Butler to establish a new 50-lap track record that stood for many years after his retirement

===== 1991 =====
The 1991 season was bittersweet for the Hoffman/Butler alliance. The team continued to excel at raw speed; it set the most fast qualifying times and won the most USAC sprint car races. The team also won the majority of the live-television races on ESPN, including wins on the notorious hi-banks at Salem Speedway and at Indianapolis Raceway Park. Despite being the winningest team on the USAC circuit, they finished third in the series point standings after a string of mechanical problems caused inconsistent finishes.

===== 1992 =====
The highlight of Butler's 1992 USAC season was winning his second Silver Crown championship. This championship run was the most dramatic of Butler's career. Coming into the season's final race, at Eldora Speedway, Butler was well behind point-leader Jeff Swindell. With only a slim chance at the championship, Butler had to win; second place had no mathematical chance. He improved his chances by setting the fastest qualifying speed and earning the pole starting position. During the race, Butler and points-leader Jeff Swindell traded the lead and battled for advantage. In the final laps, Butler was able to prevail for the win, but did not know the championship outcome. Only after points were tallied, did he learn that he had won the championship. Butler attributes much of this success to the return of Phil Poor, his former mechanic on the Stoops sprint car team. Although the pair had not worked together since 1989, winning the Silver Crown championship proved that they still had the right "chemistry."

In the sprint car division, the Butler/Hoffman team struggled through a difficult season marred by crashes and mechanical problems. In between these problems, Butler won at Winchester Speedway after battling with future NASCAR star Tony Stewart. He would eventually finish the year second in the championship standings. This was Butler's eighth, and final, season to run the full USAC sprint schedule, (Note: Although Butler competed in USAC from 1982 to 1993, he did not run the full USAC sprint schedule during four of these years, due to other obligations: 1982, debut USAC race only; 1983, focus on Paragon Championship; 1989, Indy Car entry and injuries; 1993, USAC Suspension.) during these years, he won four championships and was never below the top-three in championship points.

=== Wings ===
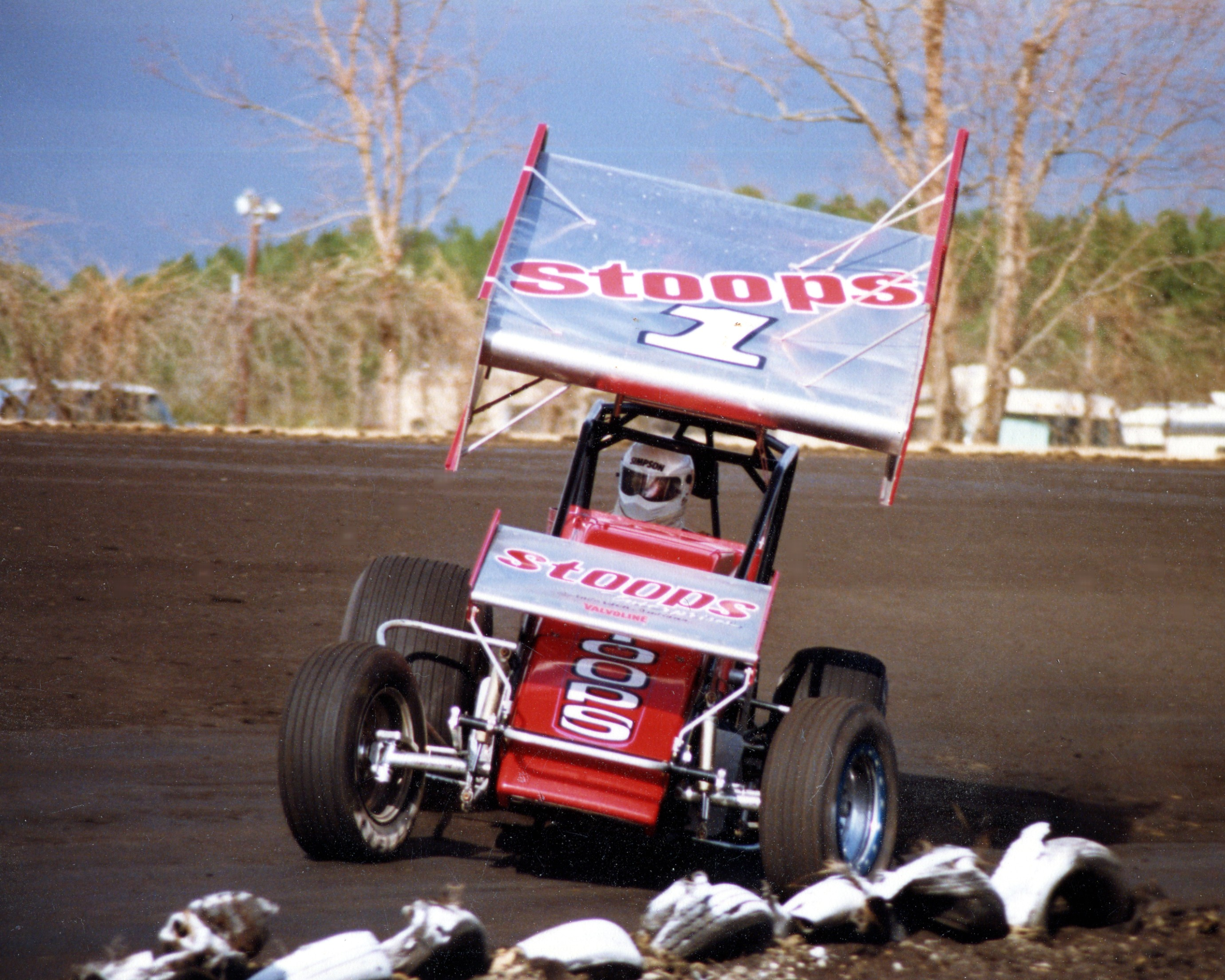
Butler won in both winged-sprint cars and in the non-winged formula preferred by USAC

Butler was known primarily for his success in non-winged USAC racing, however he also performed well in the winged-sprint cars. Steve occasionally raced with winged-sprint specialists such as the AllStar Circuit of Champions (Allstars) and World of Outlaws and was very competitive. He won six races with the Allstars and, in 1987, finished top-ten in the AllStar point standings, despite running a limited schedule due to conflicts with his USAC commitments.

When USAC briefly experimented with winged-sprint races, Butler won several of these against competition that included regulars from the AllStar Circuit of Champions and World of Outlaws. (Note: USAC winged-sprint races typically attracted winged-sprint car specialists that did not compete at non-wing USAC races.)

=== Final season controversy ===
For 1993, Butler changed to the Chrisman Racing team hoping to find a new chemistry that could lead to another sprint championship. Butler was consistently running well and, at mid-season, was again leading the point standings in both the Sprint and Silver Crown divisions.

Butler scored an early Silver Crown win at the Hulman 100 (Indianapolis). This race was his final USAC victory and included a special twist: Butler was forced to perform in-cockpit diagnosis and repair of a problem that was causing the engine to misfire. At mid-race, the rough-running engine was causing Butler to fade back into the pack and was threatening his ability to even finish. However, during a caution period, Butler was able to identify the problem as a faulty ignition switch. He then disconnected the switch and secured the bare wire by tying it off around a hydraulic hose, thereby preventing the exposed strands from shorting out. All this was accomplished on the race track, while driving with one hand and repairing with the other. With full power restored, Butler charged into the lead and defeated Ron Shuman by ten seconds at the checkered flag.

Unfortunately, Butler's hopes for additional USAC titles were destroyed in July when he was involved in racing accidents in two consecutive races. Officials levied a rare one-month driving suspension against him, effectively eliminated his championship hopes.

USAC's actions created significant controversy: the club had little precedent for such harsh action against a current champion and points leader; on the other hand Butler had a history of driving aggressively and some thought his risk-taking style needed to be reigned in. In spite of this controversy—or perhaps because of it—the Hoosier Auto Racing Fan club immediately inducted Butler into its Hall of Fame.

At the end of the season, Butler decided to conclude his racing career and focus on pursuing his future career in electronic systems engineering.

== Engineering career ==
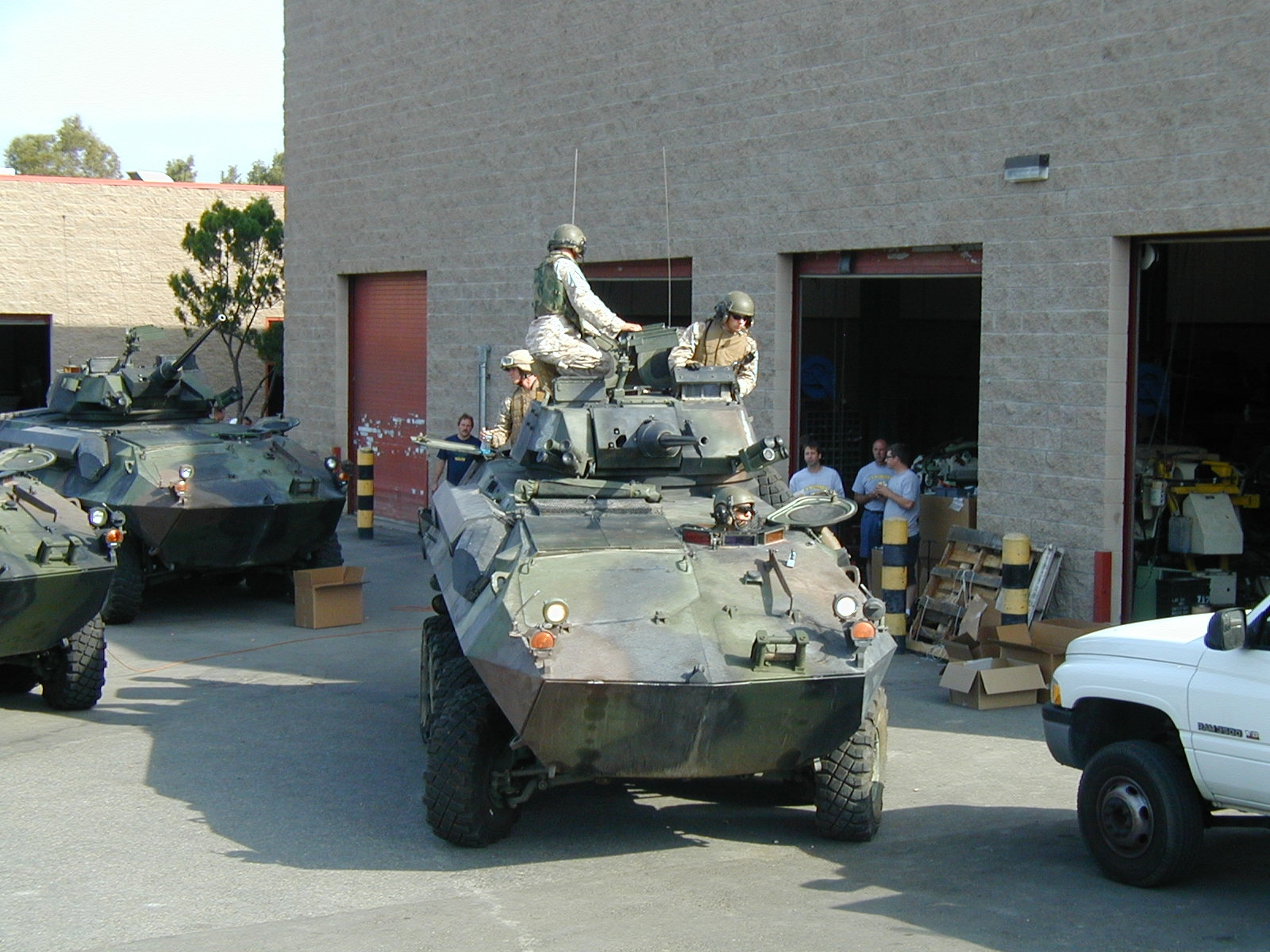
Butler's engineering team watches as US Marines test drive a LAV-25 equipped with Delphi's prototype electronics system. Camp Pendleton, CA.

After retiring from racing, Butler focused on a career at Delphi Automotive Systems. In two years, he earned a BSBA from Indiana Wesleyan University and was recognized with the "Outstanding Professional" award in his graduating class. Despite lacking a technical degree, Butler then set out to become an engineer by relying on technical skills he had honed as a racer. This determination eventually paid off as Butler became a senior systems engineer and received many company awards for his technical contributions. On one occasion, Butler received a $20,000 bonus for cost-saving electrical diagnostic procedures he developed. These accomplishments allowed Butler to receive increasingly challenging technical assignments, such as:

- Lead engineer for Delphi's first concept demonstration of "fly-by-wire" electronic throttle control for motorcycle applications.
- Lead engineer for a prototype electronic data monitoring system for combat vehicles. Butler was also project manager for the system's installation into a test fleet of United States Marine Corps LAV-25 armored vehicles.
- Systems integration technical leader for advanced hybrid electric propulsion for heavy duty vehicles.
- Technical manager for Powertrain Electronic Controls.

== Journalism and media ==
Butler was a regular contributor to Open Wheel Magazine during the last four years of his racing career. He authored a wide range of monthly opinion columns and technical articles until his retirement from racing. In 1992, Butler's writing caught the attention of Motor Trend magazine who asked him to author an engine technology article. Pleased with the result, Motor Trend later offered Steve a full-time technical editor job. Butler declined, wishing to stay in Indiana rather than move to the west coast.

Butler also performed as television on-camera commentator for several ESPN broadcasts of USAC races, from 1988 to 1996. His role was to add color and racing insight in order to help fans better understand the sport. He was successful and offered other broadcast opportunities. However, Butler had left racing to pursue an engineering career and time with his family, not to continue to travel to race tracks in a non-driving role. He was also concerned that being at the races would tempt him to get back into the cockpit.

== Retirement ==
Butler retired from racing determined to make a clean break from the sport to focus on the new challenges of his engineering career, while also devoting more time to his family.

== Hall of fame inductions ==
In 1993, Butler was inducted into the Hoosier Auto Racing Fans Hall of Fame and joined AJ Foyt, Mario Andretti, Bobby Unser, Jeff Gordon and Tony Stewart in receiving this honor.

In 2004, Butler was honored to be inducted into Howard County Sports Hall of Fame in Kokomo, Indiana. He is the only racing driver to be so inducted.

In 2005, Butler was honored to be inducted into National Sprint Car Hall of Fame in Knoxville, IA. Fellow 2005 inductees include Steve Kinser and Robbie Stanley.

In 2016, Butler was honored with induction into the USAC Hall of Fame in Indianapolis, IN. Tony Stewart and Rick Mears are fellow 2016 inductees.

== Indianapolis Motor Speedway Museum exhibit ==
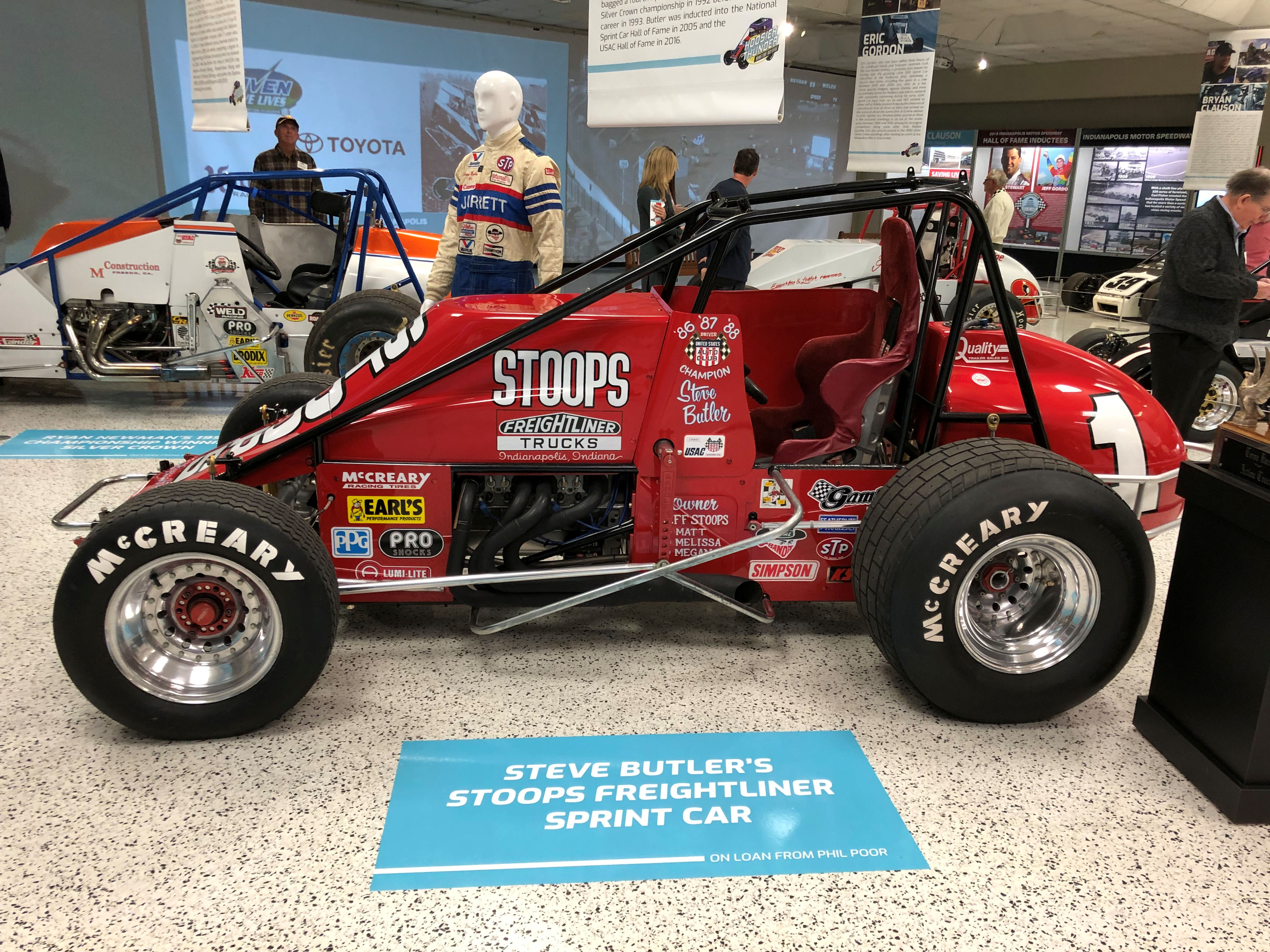
The Stoops Freightliner sprint car that Steve Butler drove to 3 consecutive USAC national champions; as displayed at the Indianapolis Motor Speedway Museum.

In 2018, the Indianapolis Motor Speedway Museum honored Steve Butler's racing career by featuring his accomplishments as part of the Hoosier Thunder exhibit. Focusing on short track open wheel racing champions, Hoosier Thunder honored dirt track championships won by Jeff Gordon, Tony Stewart, Steve Kinser, Levi Jones, Pancho Carter, Tom Bigelow, Dave Darland and other great drivers.

== Notes ==
Sporting positions
Preceded by Rickey Hood	USAC Sprint Car Champion; 1986-88	Succeeded by Rich Vogler
Preceded by Jack Hewitt	USAC Silver Crown Champion; 1988	Succeeded by Chuck Gurney
Preceded by Rich Vogler	USAC Sprint Car Champion; 1990	Succeeded by Robbie Stanley
Preceded by Jeff Gordon	USAC Silver Crown Champion; 1992	Succeeded by Mike Bliss
