= Penske PC-18 =

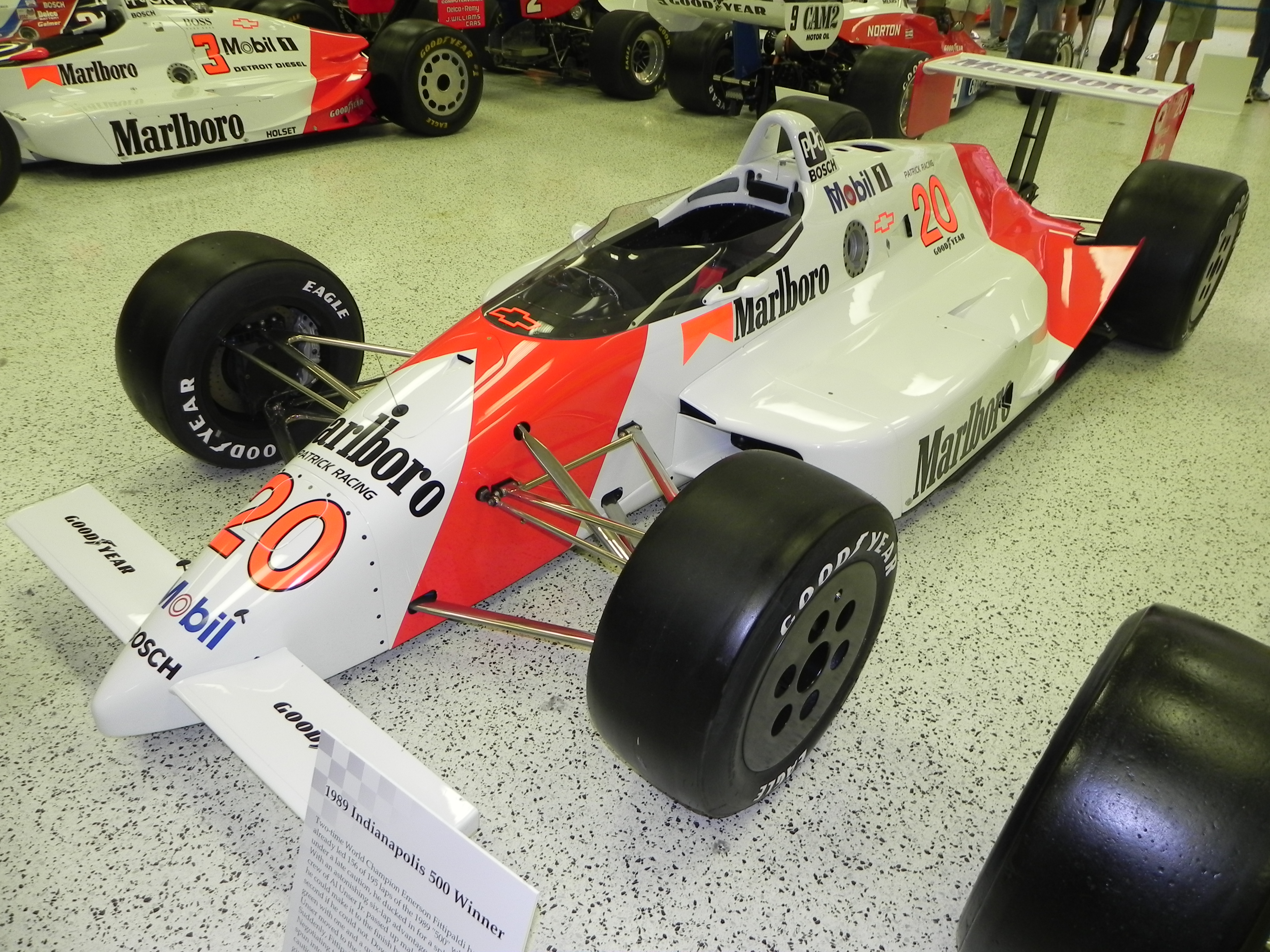
- the Penske PC-18 driven by Emerson Fittipaldi for Patrick Racing
- Category: CART IndyCar
- Constructor: Penske Cars Ltd.
- Designer: Nigel Bennett
- Predecessor: Penske PC-17
- Successor: Penske PC-19

Technical specifications
- Suspension (front): pushrod
- Suspension (rear): pushrod
- Engine: Ilmor-Chevrolet 265A V8 90° turbocharged Mid-engined, longitudinally mounted
- Transmission: manual
- Fuel: Methanol
- Tyres: Goodyear Eagle

Competition history
- Notable entrants: Penske Racing
- Notable drivers: Rick Mears; Emerson Fittipaldi; Danny Sullivan; Eddie Cheever; Al Unser
- Debut: 1989 Checker Autoworks 200
Races	Wins	Poles
28	10	11
- Teams' Championships: 1 1989 IndyCar Series
- Constructors' Championships: 1 1989 IndyCar Series
- Drivers' Championships: 1 1989 IndyCar Series

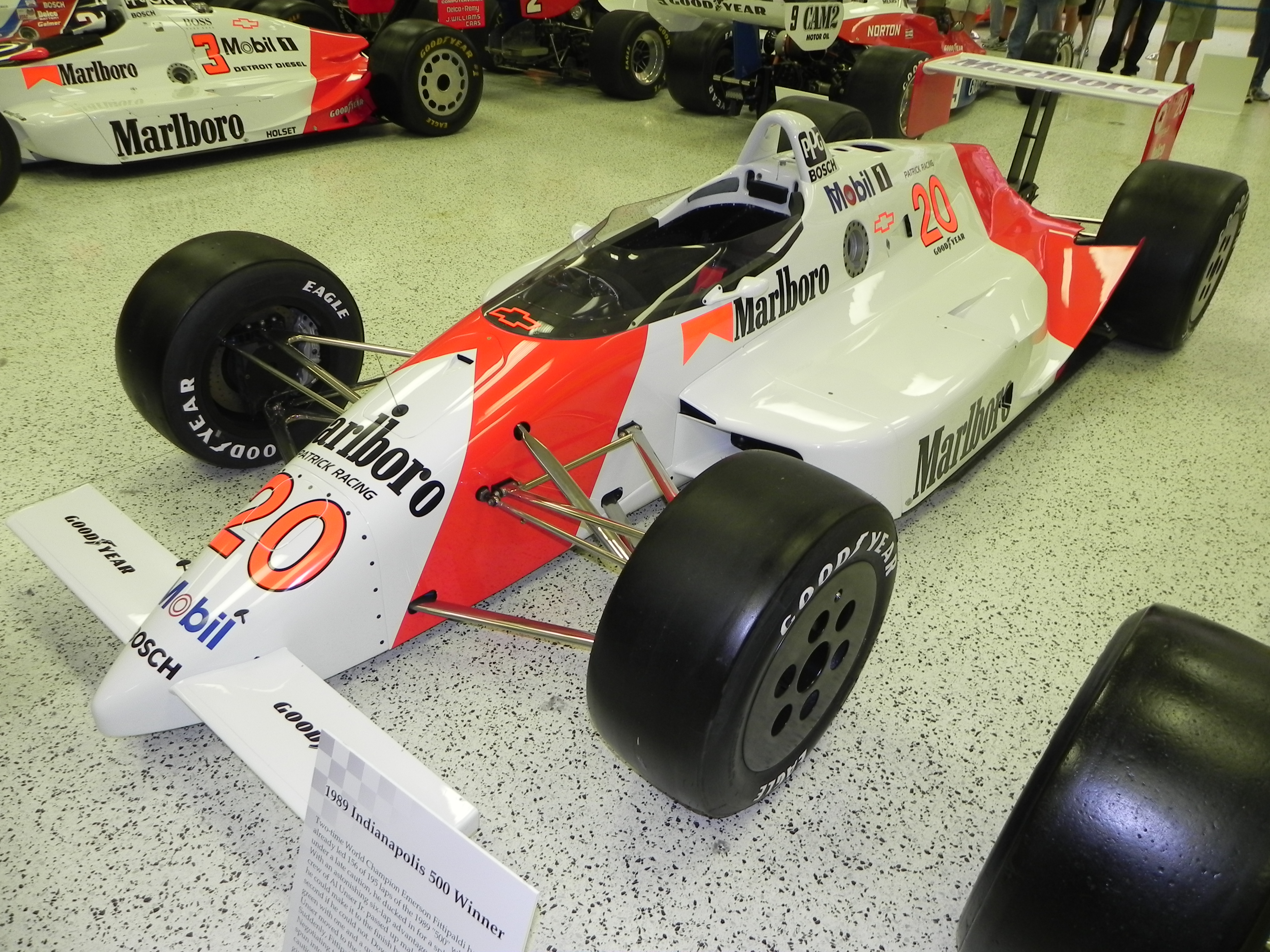
Emerson Fittipaldi's 1989 Indianapolis 500 winning car for Patrick Racing was a PC-18.

The Penske PC-18 was a CART Penske Racing car which was constructed for competition in the 1989 season. The chassis was fielded by two teams, Penske Racing and Patrick Racing.

Rick Mears won the pole position for the 1989 Indianapolis 500 with the car, and Emerson Fittipaldi won the race itself. Fittipaldi went on to win the 1989 CART championship driving the PC-18 chassis.

Eddie Cheever fielded the PC-18 chassis during the 1990 season for the newly formed Chip Ganassi Racing.

== Complete Indy Car World Series results ==
(key) (Results in bold indicate pole position)

Year	Team	Engine	Tyres	Driver	No.	1	2	3	4	5	6	7	8	9	10	11	12	13	14	15	16	17	Points	D.C.
1989	Team Penske	Chevrolet 265A V8t	G			PHX	LBH	INDY	MIL	DET	POR	CLE	MEA	TOR	MCH	POC	MDO	ROA	NAZ	LAG				
1989	Team Penske	Chevrolet 265A V8t	G	(United States) Danny Sullivan	1	3	8	28	10	24			8	3*	23	1	5	**1**	3	14			**107**	**7th**
1989	Team Penske	Chevrolet 265A V8t	G	(Australia) Geoff Brabham	1						14												**0**	**39th**
1989	Team Penske	Chevrolet 265A V8t	G	(United States) Al Unser	1							10											**14**	**16th**
1989	Team Penske	Chevrolet 265A V8t	G	(United States) Al Unser	25			24							8	7							**14**	**16th**
1989	Team Penske	Chevrolet 265A V8t	G	(United States) Rick Mears	4	**1**	5	**23**	**1**	5	8	5	4	5	7	2	6	3	**2**	**1**			**186**	**2nd**
1989	Patrick Racing	Chevrolet 265A V8t	G	(Brazil) Emerson Fittipaldi	20			1	16	1	1	1	**2**	**2**	**14**	**19**	4	5	1	5			**196***	**1st***
1990	Chip Ganassi Racing	Chevrolet 265A V8t	G			PHX	LBH	INDY	MIL	DET	POR	CLE	MEA	TOR	MCH	DEN	VAN	MDO	ROA	NAZ	LAG			
1990	Chip Ganassi Racing	Chevrolet 265A V8t	G	(United States) Eddie Cheever	15	7	13		11	3	19				4								**80***	**9th***
1990	Chip Ganassi Racing	Chevrolet 265A V8t	G	(United States) Eddie Cheever	25			8															**80***	**9th***
1990	Granatelli Racing	Buick 3300 V6t	G	(United States) Tom Sneva	9			30															**0**	**44th**
1990	Granatelli Racing	Buick 3300 V6t	G	(Belgium) Didier Theys	9					13	20	23	28	7		9	25	16					**15***	**18th***
1990	Granatelli Racing	Buick 3300 V6t	G	(Belgium) Didier Theys	70			11															**15***	**18th***
1990	Granatelli Racing	Buick 3300 V6t	G	(United States) Kevin Cogan	11			9															**4**	**23rd**
1991	Walther Motorsports	Cosworth DFS V8t	G			SFR	LBH	PHX	INDY	MIL	DET	POR	CLE	MEA	TOR	MCH	DEN	VAN	MDO	ROA	NAZ	LAG		
1991	Walther Motorsports	Cosworth DFS V8t	G	(United States) Salt Walther	77				DNQ														-	NC

*Includes points scored by other cars.
