= John Jones (racing driver) =

Driver in the CART Championship Car series

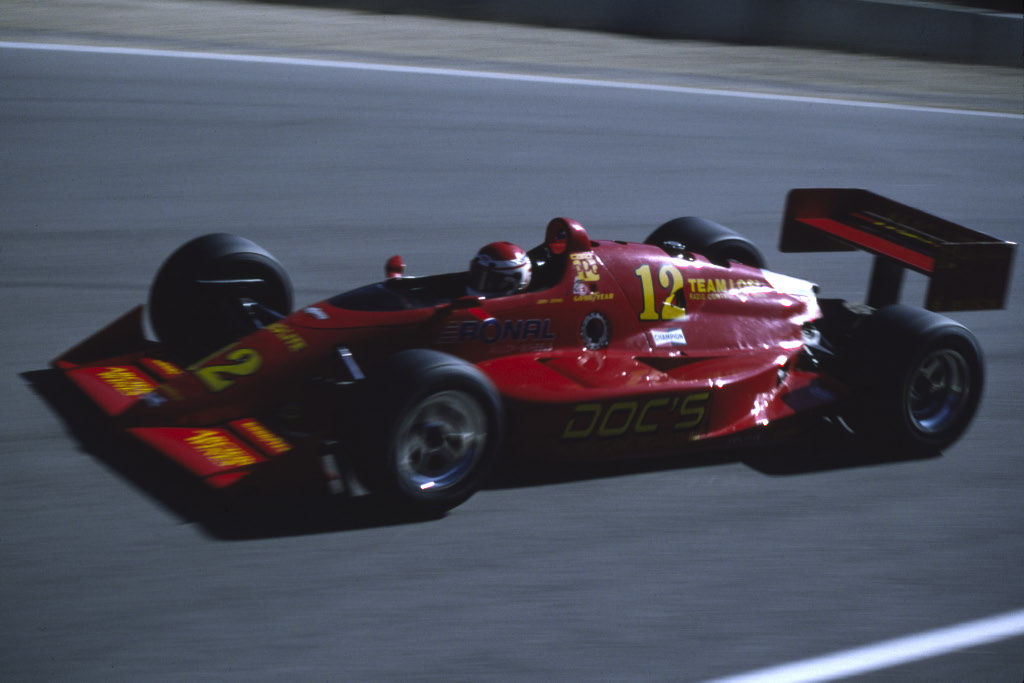
- Jones racing in 1991
- Full name: John Bradley Jones
- Born: October 19, 1965 (age 61) Thunder Bay, Ontario, Canada

Awards
- 1988 PPG Indy Car World Series Rookie of the Year

Champ Car career
- 41 races run over 4 years
- Years active: 1988–1992
- Best finish: 11th (1988)
- First race: 1988 XM Satellite Radio Indy 200 (Phoenix Raceway)
- Last race: 1992 Firestone Indy 225 (Nazareth Speedway)

John Bradley Jones (born October 19, 1965 in Thunder Bay, Ontario) is a Canadian former driver. He raced in the CART PPG IndyCar World Series from 1988 to 1992, with 41 career starts including the 1989 Indianapolis 500. He finished in the top-ten 11 times, including four in seventh position in 1988, when he finished the season in 11th position and was named Rookie of the Year.

John's brother Hunter Jones was also an active driver in the CART Indy Lights championship.

== Personal life ==
Jones married Sports Car Club of America Trans-Am Series manager Robyn Watkins in April 1990. They have two children. Jones holds an architecture degree.

== Racing results ==
=== Complete International Formula 3000 results ===
(key) (Races in bold indicate pole position; races in italics indicate fastest lap.)

| Year | Entrant | 1 | 2 | 3 | 4 | 5 | 6 | 7 | 8 | 9 | 10 | 11 | Pos. | Pts |
|---|---|---|---|---|---|---|---|---|---|---|---|---|---|---|
| 1986 | Onyx Race Engineering | SIL; 20 | VAL; DNQ | PAU; 6 | SPA; 22 | IMO; DNQ | MUG; 12 | PER; 11 | ÖST; 14 | BIR; 7 | BUG; 15 | JAR; 11 | 21st | 1 |
| 1987 | Lola Motorsport | SIL; Ret | VAL; 5 | SPA; 7 | PAU; 2 | DON; 13 | PER; 8 | BRH; 8 | BIR; 7 | IMO; 9 | BUG; 11 | **JAR**; 10 | 11th | 8 |
| 1990 | Paul Stewart Racing | DON; 3 | SIL; 11 | PAU; 4 | JER; Ret | MNZ; Ret | PER; Ret | HOC; DNQ | BRH; DNQ | BIR; 11 | BUG; 9 | NOG; DNQ | 12th | 7 |

=== Complete American Open Wheel racing results ===
(key)

==== PPG IndyCar World Series ====
(key) (Races in bold indicate pole position)

| Year | Team | 1 | 2 | 3 | 4 | 5 | 6 | 7 | 8 | 9 | 10 | 11 | 12 | 13 | 14 | 15 | 16 | 17 | Rank | Points | Ref |
|---|---|---|---|---|---|---|---|---|---|---|---|---|---|---|---|---|---|---|---|---|---|
| 1988 | Arciero Racing | PHX; 20 | LBH; 12 | INDY; DNQ | MIL; 14 | POR; 8 | CLE; 7 | TOR; 7 | MEA; 7 | MCH; 8 | POC; 8 | MDO; 7 | ROA; 13 | NAZ; 11 | LAG; 11 | MIA; 16 | | | **11th** | **44** | |
| 1989 | Protofab Racing | PHX; 16 | LBH; 20 | INDY; 11 | MIL; 11 | DET; 11 | POR; 19 | CLE; 25 | MEA; 11 | TOR; 18 | MCH; 16 | POC; 10 | MDO; 13 | ROA; 10 | NAZ | LAG; 22 | | | **17th** | **14** | |
| 1991 | Arciero Racing | SRF | LBH | PHX | INDY | MIL | DET | POR | CLE; 21 | MEA; 19 | TOR; 10 | MCH; 8 | DEN; 11 | VAN; 15 | MDO; 21 | ROA; 21 | NAZ; 13 | LAG; 21 | **18th** | **10** | |
| 1992 | Arciero Racing | SRF | PHX | LBH | INDY | DET | POR | MIL | NHA | TOR | MCH | CLE | ROA | VAN; 12 | MDO; 23 | NAZ; 22 | LAG | | **36th** | **1** | |

==== Indy Lights ====
| Year | Team | 1 | 2 | 3 | 4 | 5 | 6 | 7 | 8 | 9 | 10 | 11 | 12 | 13 | Rank | Points | Ref |
|---|---|---|---|---|---|---|---|---|---|---|---|---|---|---|---|---|---|
| 1997 | Eclipse Racing | MIA; 19 | LBH; 25 | NAZ; 19 | SAV; 19 | STL | MIL | DET; 20 | POR; 18 | TOR | TRO | VAN | LAG | FON | **33rd** | **0** | |

==== Indianapolis 500 ====
| Year | Chassis | Engine | Start | Finish | Team |
|---|---|---|---|---|---|
| 1988 | March | Cosworth | DNQ | | PPI Motorsports |
| 1989 | Lola | Cosworth | 25 | 11 | Protofab Racing |

== See also ==
- List of Canadians in Champ Car

Sporting positions
| Preceded by Fabrizio Barbazza | CART Rookie of the Year; 1988 | Succeeded by Bernard Jourdain |
