= Bernard Jourdain =

Mexican racing driver

- Nationality: (Mexico) Mexican
- Born: 16 August 1950 (age 75) Brussels, Belgium
- Relatives: Michel Jourdain Jr. (nephew)

Awards
- 1989 1989: Indianapolis 500 Rookie of the Year; CART Rookie of the year

Bernard Jourdain (born August 16, 1950, in Brussels) is a Belgian born Mexican racing driver. Jourdain is the uncle of racer Michel Jourdain Jr., and a pivotal figure in Michel Jr.’s progression from novice to Champ Car race winner. Now retired from racing, Bernard runs a restaurant in California, as well as other business projects.

== Racing career ==
=== Open Wheel Racing ===
Although Jourdain had been racing professionally since 1969, he did not appear on the international scene until late 1987, when he raced twice in Formula Atlantic. Despite crashing in both these races, he gained a drive with Cimarran Racing for the following season in Formula Super Vee USA Robert Bosch/Valvoline Championship. In his first full season, racing internationally in USA, he scored two major race victories by winning the Dallas Grand Prix and St. Petersburg GTE Grand Prix. This helped him to finish third in the overall standing. Also during the ’88 season, Jourdain made his CART debut. He signed with Andale Racing to race their March-Cosworth 86C in the last two races of the year. Broken suspension stopped him in his debut at Laguna Seca, he returned for the Miami Indy Challenge, where finished sixth.

Jourdain remained with Andale for the 1989, with the team upgrading the car to a Lola-Cosworth T89/00. It was with Andale that he made the first of his two Indianapolis 500s starts. After finishing nine laps down in ninth place, he was named the Indy 500 Co-Rookie of the Year along with Scott Pruett. He would only score one more top 10 finish, taking tenth in the Molson Indy Toronto. At the end of the season, he finished 18th in the overall standing, and was awarded the CART Rookie of the Year title.

In 1990, Jourdain returned to Andale for the Indianapolis 500. During qualifying, he wrecked his Lola-Buick T89/00, and was forced to try and qualify the spare car, a Lola-Buick T88/00. It was in this car; he ricocheted off three walls and demolished it, seriously injuring himself in the process. He underwent surgery to remove his spleen. He returned to open-wheeled racing the following season, securing a drive with A. J. Foyt Enterprises, and became the first non-US-born driver to race for four-time Indianapolis 500 winner A. J. Foyt, starting in the Toyota Long Beach Grand Prix. He raced once more with Foyt, in the Indy 500, but did not finish either of these races due to gearbox gremlins. After the race at Indianapolis, Jourdain retired from international motor sport.

=== Sports Car Racing ===
1988 also was Jourdain make his international race debut in sport cars in the SunBank 24 at Daytona with Kalagian Racing. After finishing fifth, he would continue to race Kalagian's Porsche 962 in a number of Camel GT Championship, alongside his Formula Super Vee commitments. When in 1989, he step up into CART, he cut back his sport cars racing to just another visit to the SunBank 24 at Daytona, with an outing in the works Spice Engineering team when the FIA World Sports Prototype Championship visited the Autódromo Hermanos Rodríguez in Mexico City.

Jourdain returned to the Camel GT Championship in 1990, with the Spice Engineering USA team, finishing on the third step on the podium in the Camel Grand Prix of Heartland Park, prior to his big Indy crash. He would return to racing in time for the 480km of Mexico City with Team Davey in their Porsche 962C.

It was October 2005, when after a break of 14 years away from the track, Jourdain dusted down his crash helmet and raced in round of the Campeonato de España de GT. He continued into 2006, with Lozano Motorsport/Estudio 2000 sa, in their Porsche 996 GT3-RSR, alongside Manuel Sáez-Merino Jr. in a selection of International GT Open race, archiving two tenth places finishes.

== Racing record ==
=== Career highlights ===
Season	Series	Position	Team	Car
1988	Formula Super Vee USA Robert Bosch/Valvoline Championship	3rd	Cimarran Racing	Ralt-Volkswagen RT5
	Camel GT Championship season	25th	Kalagian Racing	Porsche 962
	CART PPG Indy Car World Series	26th	Andale Racing	March-Cosworth 86C
1989	USAC Gold Crown Series	9th	Andale Racing	Lola-Cosworth T89/00
	CART PPG Indy Car World Series	18th	Andale Racing	Lola-Cosworth T89/00
	Camel GT Championship season	46th	Bernard Jourdain	Porsche 962
1990	Camel GT Championship season	26th	Spice Engineering USA	Spice-Chevrolet SE90P
1991	USAC Gold Crown Series	18th	A. J. Foyt Enterprises	Lola-Buick T90/00
	CART PPG Indy Car World Series	42nd	A. J. Foyt Enterprises	Lola-Chevrolet T90/00; Lola-Buick T90/00

=== Complete 24 Hours of Daytona results ===
Year	Team	Co-Drivers	Car	Class	Laps	Pos.	Class Pos.
1988	(United States) Kalagian Racing	(United States) Jim Rothbarth (Mexico) Michel Jourdain Sr. (United States) Rob Stevens	Porsche 962	GTP	680	5th	5th
1989	(Mexico) Bernard Jourdain	(Mexico) Oscar Manautou (Canada) Allen Berg (Mexico) Andres Contreras	Porsche 962	GTP	485	18th (DNF)	7th (DNF)
1990	(United Kingdom) Panasonic/Carlos & Charlies	(United States) Jeff Kline (Japan) Hiro Matsushita	Spice-Chevrolet SE90P	GTP	90	47th (DNF)	13th (DNF)

=== Complete 12 Hours of Sebring results ===
Year	Team	Co-Drivers	Car	Class	Laps	Pos.	Class Pos.
1988	(United States) John Kalagian Racing	(United States) Jim Rothbarth	Porsche 962	GTP	90	62nd (DNF)	13th (DNF)
1990	(United Kingdom) Spice Engineering GB	(United States) Tom Kendall (United States) Albert Naon Jr.	Spice-Chevrolet SE90P	GTP	222	18th (DNF)	8th (DNF)

=== American Open Wheel racing results ===
(key)

==== Formula Super Vee ====
Year	Team	1	2	3	4	5	6	7	8	9	10	11	12	13	Rank	Points
1988	Cimarron Racing	PHX; Ret	LBH; 3	DAL; 1	IRP; 4	MIL; 5	DET; 12	NIA; 3	CLE; 2	MEA; Ret	MDO; 5	ROA; 3	NAZ; 2	STP; 1	3rd	152

==== CART ====
Year	Team	1	2	3	4	5	6	7	8	9	10	11	12	13	14	15	16	17	Rank	Points	Ref
1988	Andale Racing	PHX	LBH	INDY	MIL	POR	CLE	TOR	MEA	MIS	POC	MDO	ROA	NAZ	LS; 20	MIA; 6			26th	8	
1989	Andale Racing	PHX; 19	LBH; 13	INDY; 9	MIL; 12	DET; 15	POR; 22	CLE; 19	MEA; 19	TOR; 10	MIS; 19	POC; 11	MDO; 27	ROA	NAZ; 15	LS; 23			18th	10	
1990	Andale Racing	PHX	LBH	INDY; Inj	MIL	DET	POR	CLE	MEA	TOR	MIS	DEN	VAN	MDO	ROA	NAZ	LS		NC	-	
1991	A. J. Foyt Enterprises	SRF	LBH; 20	PHX	INDY; 18	MIL	DET	POR	CLE	MEA	TOR	MIS	DEN	VAN	MDO	ROA	NAZ	LS	42nd	0	

==== Indianapolis 500 ====
Year	Chassis	Engine	Start	Finish	Team
1989	Lola T89/00	Ford Cosworth DFX	20	9	Andale Racing
1990	Lola T89/00	Buick	Injured		Andale Racing
1991	Lola T91/00	Buick	21	18	A. J. Foyt Enterprises

Sporting positions
Preceded by Bill Vukovich III	Indianapolis 500; Rookie of the Year; 1989 shared with Scott Pruett	Succeeded by Eddie Cheever
Preceded by John Jones	CART; Rookie of the Year; 1989	Succeeded by Eddie Cheever
