= March 89C/89P =

Race car chassis designed by March Engineering to compete in the 1989 IndyCar season

The March 89P and March 89CE are two different open-wheel race car chassis, designed and built by March Engineering to compete in the 1989 IndyCar season. The 89P was designed by Gordon Coppuck for the works Porsche North America team and was powered by the Porsche Indy V8 engine. It won one race and took two pole positions, all with Teo Fabi.

The 89CE was designed by Maurice Philippe for the Alfa Romeo supported Alex Morales Motorsports team, and was fitted with the Alfa Romeo Indy V8 engine. The driver was Roberto Moreno and the best result was an 8th place at Detroit.
