= Lola T89/00 =

Racing car designed and built by Lola Cars

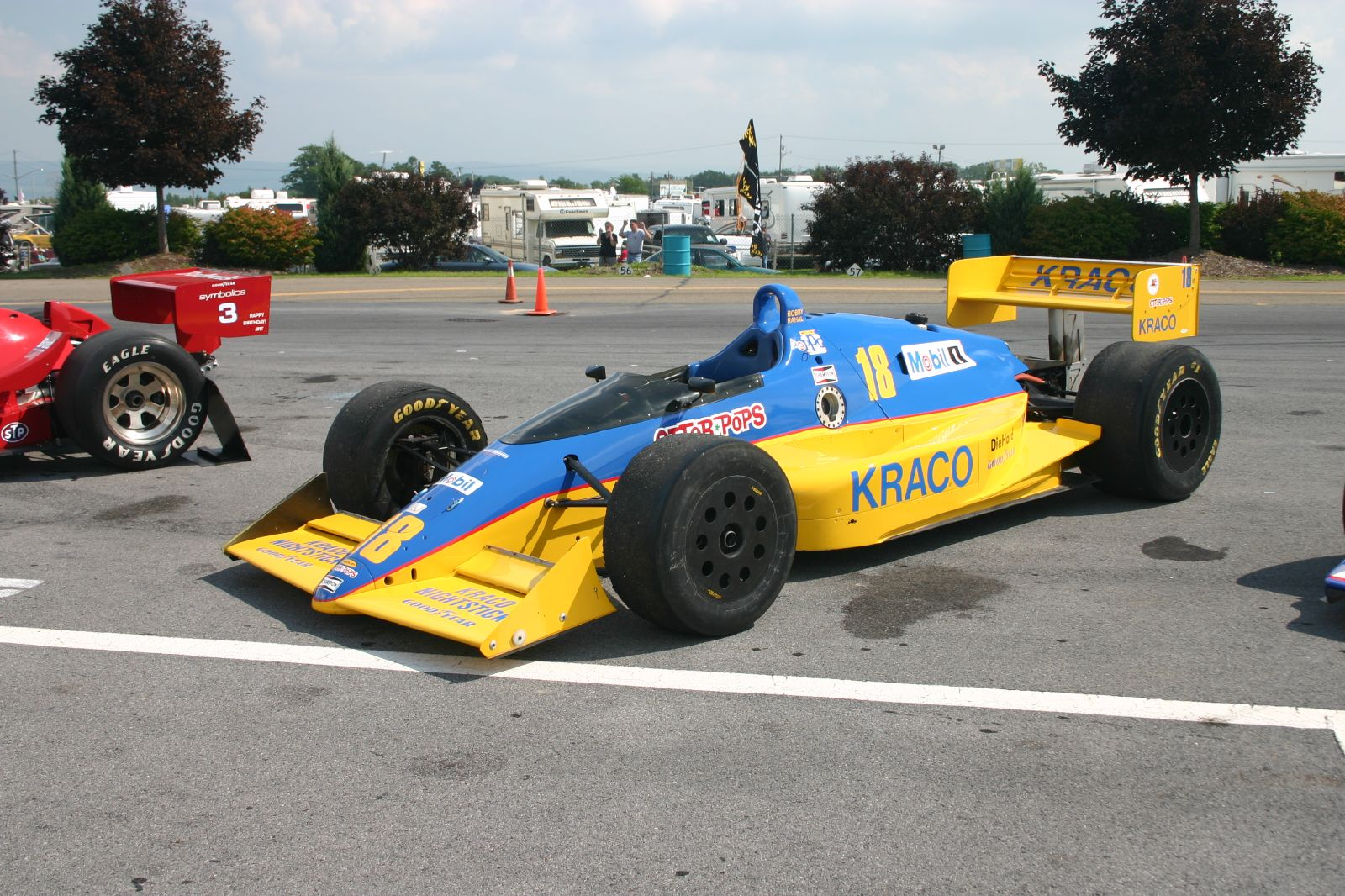
- Category: CART IndyCar
- Constructor: Lola
- Predecessor: Lola T88/00
- Successor: Lola T90/00

Technical specifications
- Length: 4,978 mm (196 in)
- Width: 2,032 mm (80 in)
- Height: 940 mm (37 in)
- Axle track: 1,753 mm (69 in) (Front); 1,638 mm (64 in) (Rear)
- Wheelbase: 3,048 mm (120 in)
- Engine: Ford-Cosworth DFX; Buick Indy V6 2.65–3.43 L (2,650–3,430 cc; 162–209 cu in) mid-engined
- Transmission: 6-speed manual
- Weight: 1,550 lb (700 kg)
- Fuel: Methanol
- Tyres: Goodyear

Competition history
- Notable drivers: Mario Andretti; Michael Andretti; Al Unser Jr.
- Debut: 1989 Checker Autoworks 200
Entries	Wins	Poles
15	5	3

The Lola T89/00 is an open-wheel racing car chassis, designed and built by Lola Cars that competed in the CART open-wheel racing series, for competition in the 1989 IndyCar season. It won a total of 5 races that season; 1 for Bobby Rahal, 2 for Michael Andretti, and 2 for Al Unser Jr., and took 3 pole positions; 2 for Michael Andretti, 1 for Al Unser Jr. It was mainly powered by the Ford-Cosworth DFX, but also used the Buick Indy V6.
