= 1987 Pocono 500 =

(United States) 1987 Pocono 500
Race details
- 10th round of the 1987 CART PPG Indy Car World Series season
- Date: August 16, 1987
- Official name: 1987 Quaker State 500
- Location: Long Pond, Pennsylvania
- Course: Permanent racing facility 2.5 mi / 4.023 km
- Distance: 200 laps 500 mi / 804.672 km
- Weather: Temperatures up to 88 °F (31 °C); wind speeds up to 15 miles per hour (24 km/h)

Pole position
- Driver: (United States) Mario Andretti (Newman/Haas Racing)
- Time: 200.915 mph

Podium
- First: (United States) Rick Mears (Team Penske)
- Second: (Australia) Geoff Brabham (Galles Racing)
- Third: (Colombia) Roberto Guerrero (Vince Granatelli Racing)

The 1987 Pocono 500, the 17th running of the event, was held at the Pocono Raceway in Long Pond, Pennsylvania, on Sunday, August 16, 1987. Branded as the 1987 Quaker State 500 for sponsorship reasons, the race was won by Rick Mears, snapping a two-year winless drought, and earning his third Pocono 500 win.

== Background ==
In 1981, Pocono Raceway filed an antitrust lawsuit against CART seeking $9 million in damages due to boycotts of the 1979 and 1981 races. As part of the settlement, CART agreed to lease and promote the Pocono 500 for a period of five years between 1982 and 1986. At the end of the contract, there were questions over whether the race would continue. A deal was reached where the Pocono 500 would remain as part of the Indy car schedule for the next four years with Pocono promoting the race themselves. Track owner Joseph Mattioli was optimistic that the event could return to the crowds over 100,000 spectators of the 1970s. "We feel good about promoting the race again. It was difficult for CART to promote the race because it is based in Michigan. They don't know our people... With the continuation of Indy car racing I believe we will remain a full service track. And in two or three years I think the Indy car race will be back to the status it had in the 1970s."

Quaker State replaced Domino's Pizza as the title sponsor of the Pocono 500. As Domino's also sponsored the Triple Crown Championship, the one million dollar bonus for winning all three 500 mile races was dropped as was the $10,000 bonus for scoring the most points in the three races.

Al Unser won his fourth Indianapolis 500 in late May. Michael Andretti won the Michigan 500 two weeks earlier.

Tom Sneva was fired from his team just five days before Pocono and the car was withdrawn from the race. Entering the Michigan 500 in early August, Sneva was fired from Curb Racing after his wife complained that the team was behind in Sneva's paychecks. Sneva was rehired by the team, but when he arrived at Michigan, he found that Ed Pimm was hired to replace him. A late deal was reached for Sneva to drive a backup while Pimm drove Sneva's car. Pimm suffered a broken arm in a crash, while Sneva completed only five laps. While plans called for Sneva to resume his duties at Pocono, he was fired again entering Pocono. John Andretti was hired to replace Sneva in the following event.

A Team Penske car for Danny Ongais was withdrawn from Pocono after Ongais crashed it in the Michigan 500 two weeks earlier. The team was unable to prepare a new car in time.

Entering Pocono, CART reduced the turbocharger boost levels from 48 inches to 45 inches. This was expected to reduce speeds.

== Practice and Time Trials ==
=== Practice - Thursday, August 13 ===
The opening day of practice on Thursday, August 13, was led by Michael Andretti with a speed of 196.451 mph. Mario Andretti was second at 196.292 mph, followed by Rick Mears at 193.170 mph.

=== Qualifying - Friday, August 14 ===
In Friday's qualifying session, Mario Andretti won the pole with a speed of 200.915 mph. Rick Mears was second at a speed of 200.611 mph. Bobby Rahal qualified third at 198.820 mph. It was same three front row starters as that year's Indianapolis 500. Johnny Rutherford spun and hit the wall in turn two in Friday's practice but rebounded to qualify 12th.

Rookie Davy Jones crashed in practice on Friday morning and his car was withdrawn from the race.

== Support Races ==
On Saturday before the Pocono 500, a 40-lap American Racing Series event was held. Tommy Byrne started on the pole and led every lap of the caution-free race. Jeff Andretti followed up his 1986 win with a second-place finish.

A 20-lap SCCA Volkswagen Cup race for Volkswagen Golfs was held. With an average speed of 109.967 mph, 60 year-old Les Behm won the race with his teammate Luis Campos second. The husband and wife team of Bob and Sheila Bushey finished third and fourth respectively.

== Race ==
The grand marshal for the race was Roger A. Markle, President and CEO of Quaker State. The national anthem prior to the race was sung by Lauren Hart. The crowd was estimated at 55,000 spectators.

At the start, Mario Andretti pulled ahead to a lead. In turn one, Scott Brayton and Johnny Rutherford crashed, ending their day after just seconds. Derek Daly spun to avoid the crash but continued. It was the second straight year where Brayton crashed on the first lap of the Pocono 500.

Mario Andretti held the lead for the first 21 laps. Michael Andretti passed his father for the lead on lap 22. Al Unser Jr suffered burns to his right thigh when his dashboard caught fire on lap 12. On the first pit stop, Michael Andretti lost the clutch on his car. To leave the pit, the crew was forced to spin the wheels while on air jacks, drop the car, and take off while the wheels contacted the ground.

As the leaders began to make green flag pit stops, Jeff MacPherson spun and hit the wall in turn three. Bobby Rahal spun to avoid the crash and lost a lap after stalling the car.

The caution flag gave Emerson Fittipaldi the lead, which he held for 60 of the next 62 laps. Rick Mears was running second and closing on Fittipaldi when the next caution came out on lap 89 when Mario Andretti spun and crashed in turn one. The defending Pocono 500 champion, Andretti's helmet cracked in the crash and he suffered a separated left shoulder.

One lap after the restart on lap 95, Mears passed Fittipaldi for the lead. As he extended his lead, several of the top cars fell out of contention.

On lap 115, Fittipaldi fell out of the race with engine failure. During a pit stop on lap 120, Michael Andretti stalled his car and the crew broke off the rear wing trying to push him away. Mears had led by up to 19 seconds until Gary Bettenhausen spun on lap 144 and brought out the caution.

With 100 miles remaining, Mears, Geoff Brabham, and Roberto Guerrero were the only three cars on the lead lap.

The final caution came out on lap 161 when Al Unser blew an engine and hit the wall. The three lead lap cars pitted for fuel and tires. Under caution, Randy Lewis blew an engine and stalled on track, extending the slow period. Knowing they were near being able to make the finish without pitting again, Mears returned to the pits for additional fuel. Geoff Brabham also was trying to make it to the finish without pitting, while Roberto Guerrero would need to make another stop. As Mears topped off his fuel supply, Guerrero assumed the lead with Brabham second. After the race resumed, Mears passed Brabham for second on lap 175. As the cars traveled down the frontstretch on lap 184, Mears passed Guerrero and returned to the lead. Guerrero was forced to make a pit stop for fuel with five laps remaining.

With four laps remaining Ludwig Heimrath lost an engine exiting turn two and stopped on the straightaway before turn three. The safety crew was dispatched to retrieve his roadside car without the caution flag being thrown. Mears was able to stretch his fuel and win his third Pocono 500. He finished the race 17 seconds ahead of Brabham.

It was the first Indy car win for Mears since the 1985 Pocono 500. It broke a 27-race, two-year winless streak. It was also the first win in a 500-mile race for the Ilmor Chevrolet Indy V-8.

== Box score ==
Finish	Grid	No	Name	Entrant	Chassis	Engine	Laps	Time/Status	Led	Points
1	2	8	(United States) Rick Mears	Penske Racing	March 86C	Ilmor-Chevrolet	200	3:11:50.920	80	21
2	10	15	(Australia) Geoff Brabham	Galles Racing	March 87C	Judd-Honda	200	+17.320	11	16
3	4	4	(Colombia) Roberto Guerrero	Vince Granatelli Racing	March 87C	Cosworth	200	+23.840	19	14
4	14	71	(Netherlands) Arie Luyendyk	Hemelgarn Racing	March 87C	Cosworth	198	+2 Laps	0	12
5	3	1	(United States) Bobby Rahal	Truesports	Lola T87/00	Cosworth	198	+2 Laps	0	10
6	15	29	(United States) Pancho Carter	Machinists Union Racing	March 87C	Cosworth	197	+3 Laps	0	8
7	7	14	(United States) A. J. Foyt	A. J. Foyt Enterprises	Lola T87/00	Cosworth	197	+3 Laps	0	6
8	5	18	(United States) Michael Andretti	Kraco Racing	March 87C	Cosworth	196	+4 Laps	8	5
9	13	7	(United States) Kevin Cogan	Patrick Racing	March 87C	Ilmor-Chevrolet	190	+10 Laps	0	4
10	26	10	(Republic of Ireland) Derek Daly	Raynor Motorsports	Lola T87/00	Cosworth	189	+11 Laps	0	3
11	22	55	(Mexico) Josele Garza	Machinists Union Racing	March 87C	Cosworth	188	+12 Laps	0	2
12	20	23	(Canada) Ludwig Heimrath Jr.	Dick Simon Racing	Lola T87/00	Cosworth	187	+13 Laps	0	1
13	21	56	(United States) Gary Bettenhausen	Gohr Racing	March 86C	Cosworth	183	+17 Laps	0	0
14	19	12	(Italy) Fabrizio Barbazza	Arciero Racing	March 87C	Cosworth	182	+18 Laps	0	0
15	8	6	(United States) Al Unser	Penske Racing	March 86C	Cosworth	158	Crash	0	0
16	18	24	(United States) Randy Lewis	Leader Card Racers	March 87C	Cosworth	155	Engine	0	0
17	17	3	(United States) Danny Sullivan	Penske Racing	March 86C	Ilmor-Chevrolet	124	Gearbox	0	0
18	11	20	(Brazil) Emerson Fittipaldi	Patrick Racing	March 87C	Ilmor-Chevrolet	115	Engine	60	0
19	1	5	(United States) Mario Andretti	Newman/Haas Racing	Lola T87/00	Ilmor-Chevrolet	88	Crash	22	1
20	23	11	(United States) Jeff MacPherson	Galles Racing	March 87C	Judd-Honda	30	Crash	0	0
21	16	22	(United States) Dick Simon	Dick Simon Racing	Lola T87/00	Cosworth	18	Drivetrain	0	0
22	24	16	(United States) Tony Bettenhausen Jr.	Bettenhausen Motorsports	March 86C	Cosworth	15	Electrical	0	0
23	9	30	(United States) Al Unser Jr.	Doug Shierson Racing	March 87C	Cosworth	12	Electrical	0	0
24	25	19	(United States) Dale Coyne	Dale Coyne Racing	March 86C	Chevrolet	9	Engine	0	0
25	6	91	(United States) Scott Brayton	Hemelgarn Racing	March 87C	Cosworth	0	Crash	0	0
26	12	21	(United States) Johnny Rutherford	Alex Morales Motorsports	March 87C	Cosworth	0	Crash	0	0

=== Race statistics ===
Lap Leaders
Laps	Leader
1–21	Mario Andretti
22–29	Michael Andretti
30	Mario Andretti
31–33	Geoff Brabham
34–65	Emerson Fittipaldi
66–67	Geoff Brabham
68–95	Emerson Fittipaldi
96–120	Rick Mears
121–124	Geoff Brabham
125–162	Rick Mears
163–164	Geoff Brabham
165–183	Roberto Guerrero
184–200	Rick Mears

Cautions: 4 for 27 laps
Laps	Reason
1–5	Derek Daly, Johnny Rutherford, and Scott Brayton crash turn 1
32–41	Bobby Rahal and Jeff MacPherson crash turn 3
89–94	Mario Andretti crash turn 1
154–159	Gary Bettenhausen spin

== Broadcasting ==
For the first time since 1984, the Pocono 500 was broadcast by NBC in a tape-delayed format. Paul Page and Tom Sneva were the play-by-play announcers. Sally Larvick and Gary Gerould served as pit reporters.
