= 1987 Michigan 500 =

Coordinates: 42°03′58.68″N 84°14′29.18″W

(United States) 1987 Michigan 500
Race details
- Race 9 of 15 in the 1987 CART season
- Date: August 2, 1987
- Official name: 1987 Marlboro 500
- Location: Michigan International Speedway, Brooklyn, Michigan, United States
- Course: Permanent racing facility 2.000 mi / 3.219 km
- Distance: 250 laps 500.000 mi / 804.672 km
- Weather: Partly Cloudy with temperatures up to 98 °F (37 °C); wind speeds reaching up to 18 miles per hour (29 km/h)

Pole position
- Driver: (United States) Michael Andretti (Kraco Enterprises)
- Time: 215.53 mph (346.86 km/h)

Podium
- First: (United States) Michael Andretti (Kraco Enterprises)
- Second: (United States) Al Unser (Team Penske)
- Third: (United States) Bobby Rahal (Truesports)

The 1987 Michigan 500, the seventh running of the event, was held at the Michigan International Speedway in Brooklyn, Michigan, on Sunday, August 2, 1987. Branded as the 1987 Marlboro 500 for sponsorship reasons, the race was won by Michael Andretti, his first Michigan 500 victory. The event was race number 9 of 15 in the 1987 CART PPG Indy Car World Series.

== Background ==
In November 1986, the Michigan 500 was renamed the Marlboro 500. It was the first title sponsorship for the race since Norton withdrew their sponsorship following the 1982 race.

Al Unser won the 1987 Indianapolis 500. Unser got the job at Team Penske after Danny Ongais suffered a concussion during practice. Penske entered cars for both Unser and Ongais in the Michigan 500.

Entering the Michigan 500, Tom Sneva was fired by his Mike Curb-owned team after his wife complained that the team was behind in Sneva's paychecks. On Monday July 27, Sneva was informed by Curb's lawyer that he was fired from the team. After talking to Curb on Tuesday, Sneva thought he still had his job. Upon arriving to the track on Thursday for practice, Sneva found that Ed Pimm was driving his car. The team prepared a second car for Sneva and got the approval from Curb to enter it on Friday morning with the assurance that Sneva would go back to his primary ride the following race at Pocono. Sneva was ultimately fired for the final time days before the Pocono 500.

== Proposed Chicane ==
During a testing session on November 18, 1986, Rick Mears posted a lap speed of 233.934 mph at Michigan International Speedway. The run came when Mears was running with 60 inches of manifold pressure as opposed to the legal CART level of 48 inches. The speed was 10 mph over the track record that Mears set during qualifying for the 1986 Michigan 500.

In response to rising speeds and the historically high rate of attrition, Michigan track owner Roger Penske set out to reconfigure the track to slow cars. "If you read the press that has come out of the Michigan race the last two years," Penske said, "all they do is talk about it as a 'trash' track (because of the number of crashes). We're interested in not having that as our reputation."

The track installed a dogleg chicane in the middle of the backstretch which would require cars to slow down to navigate the chicane, in theory keeping average speeds down.

Driver reaction to the Michigan Chicane was mixed. Roberto Guerrero was in favor, saying, "I think it's a good idea and I'm all for it. That track is too dangerous. But it (the chicane) will have to make us slow down enough - I think it should be a third-gear turn - because if all we're doing is lifting a little, it's not going to help."

Tom Sneva was opposed, saying, "I have a little trouble understanding the theory on two points. One, if they're worried about speed, why don't they do something with the cars, not the track. And two, they're going to take one of the most entertaining tracks we have for the race fan and make it simulate some of the least entertaining tracks we have."

Defending Michigan 500 champion Johnny Rutherford was also opposed, saying, "There's never been any concrete reasoning and it really doesn't make any sense. They say they want to slow the cars down but instead they're trying to slow the track down. And I don't know why they want to deface one of our better showcases. Why do they persist in trying to do away with American oval racing? Why do they persist in trying to make us a Formula One circuit? We're talking about killing American racing."

On June 19, 1987, Rick Mears and Michael Andretti tested the chicane. Both drivers ran only two laps before giving their disapproval for the design. Andretti said, "We each ran two laps, it wasn't really worth running anymore than that. It was very bumpy and beating up the bottom of the car pretty badly. The location (of the chicane) was also bad. it was too close to the second turn and when you came off the corner the apex to the chicane was almost blind. Rick and I pretty much said the same thing and I don't think they're going to use it because it will just create more problems. I could have probably run 190-195 if I'd hustled it, but like I said, there was no reason to do that. If they wanted to slow the cars they'd have to put in a third-gear chicane. Michigan is a great place to race, better than Indianapolis, because you can go into a corner two or three abreast. If they used a chicane, that element would be eliminated. I don't know what the answer is to slowing down the cars but it's not that."

Instead of altering the track, the CART board of directors ultimately reduced turbocharger boost pressure from 48 inches to 45 inches for the Michigan 500.

== Practice and Time Trials ==
Practice began on Thursday, July 30. Rick Mears posted the fastest speed at 216.216 mph, a noticeable drop off from the year before due to the turbocharger boost pressure reduction. Mario Andretti was second fastest at 214.228 mph. Bobby Rahal was third at 213.472 mph. Rookie Fabrizio Barbazza hit the turn two wall with his right-rear but the car was repaired for qualifying.

Time Trials were held on Friday, July 31. A. J. Foyt surprised with a fast lap of 215.150 mph. His speed was fastest until late in the session when Michael Andretti ran a lap with a speed of 215.530 mph. Mario Andretti qualified third to complete the front row.

On Saturday, the International Race of Champions competed at Michigan. Al Unser Jr. beat Darrell Waltrip by 0.03 seconds to win the 100 mile race. Five of the participants also competed in the Michigan 500.

== Race ==
A crowd of 68,000 spectators filled the track for the Michigan 500. As the cars approached the green flag, the start was waved off as officials didn't like the alignment of the rows. When the race began on the second lap, Michael Andretti extended his lead.

The first caution came out on lap seven when Tom Sneva's car suffered electrical problems and needed to be towed back to the pits. When the race resumed, Michael Andretti resumed his lead. On lap 36, Mario Andretti took the lead during the cycle of pitstops.

After starting second, A. J. Foyt fell out of the race after 67 laps with a broken gearbox. Pancho Carter climbed to second but retired from engine failure on lap 132.

Mario Andretti led 170 of the 200 laps in the Indianapolis 500 and continued his dominant performance in the Michigan 500. Andretti led 118 laps and lapped the entire field. But like at Indianapolis, Andretti suffered a blown engine on lap 156 and retired from the race. Michael Andretti inherited the lead.

Unlike past Michigan 500s, the race was very clean. The only crash of the day happened on lap 181 when Ed Pimm and Danny Ongais crashed in turn three. Ongais was attempting to pass Pimm on the outside and was hit in the left rear. Pimm impacted the wall with the right side and suffered a broken right arm.

Michael Andretti held a sizable lead with only Al Unser and Bobby Rahal on the lead lap with him. Andretti beat Unser by 9.11 seconds to win his first 500-mile race. The Andretti father and son duo led 248 of 250 laps.

Andretti drove the majority of the race with a broken neck strap that subjected his head to strong forces in every turn. The event was the fastest 500 mile race in Indy car history at that point, with an average speed of 171.493 mph. While the reduced turbocharger boost helped to reduce crashes, the mechanical attrition was still high, with only 13 of the 30 starters finishing the race.

== Box score ==
Finish	Grid	No	Name	Entrant	Chassis	Engine	Laps	Time/Status	Led	Points
1	1	18	(United States) Michael Andretti	Kraco Racing	March 87C	Cosworth	250	2:54:56.071	129	22
2	6	6	(United States) Al Unser	Penske Racing	March 86C	Cosworth	250	+9.110	0	16
3	7	1	(United States) Bobby Rahal	Truesports	Lola T87/00	Cosworth	250	Running	0	14
4	8	3	(United States) Danny Sullivan	Penske Racing	March 86C	Ilmor-Chevrolet	248	+2 Laps	0	12
5	12	71	(Netherlands) Arie Luyendyk	Hemelgarn Racing	March 87C	Cosworth	247	+3 Laps	0	10
6	15	12	(Italy) Fabrizio Barbazza	Arciero Racing	March 87C	Cosworth	246	+4 Laps	0	8
7	24	20	(Brazil) Emerson Fittipaldi	Patrick Racing	March 87C	Ilmor-Chevrolet	245	+5 Laps	0	6
8	16	15	(Australia) Geoff Brabham	Galles Racing	March 87C	Judd-Honda	243	+7 Laps	3	5
9	5	22	(United States) Dick Simon	Dick Simon Racing	Lola T87/00	Cosworth	243	+7 Laps	0	4
10	23	41	(United States) Davy Jones	A. J. Foyt Enterprises	March 86C	Cosworth	240	+10 Laps	0	3
11	30	16	(United States) Tony Bettenhausen Jr.	Bettenhausen Motorsports	March 86C	Cosworth	240	+10 Laps	0	2
12	25	55	(Mexico) Josele Garza	Machinists Union Racing	March 87C	Cosworth	238	Out of fuel	0	1
13	29	56	(United States) Gary Bettenhausen	Gohr Racing	March 86C	Cosworth	224	+26 Laps	0	0
14	11	4	(Colombia) Roberto Guerrero	Vince Granatelli Racing	March 87C	Cosworth	211	CV joint	0	0
15	19	24	(United States) Randy Lewis	Leader Card Racers	March 87C	Cosworth	210	+40 Laps	0	0
16	18	98	(United States) Ed Pimm	Mike Curb Racing	March 87C	Cosworth	178	Crash	0	0
17	21	25	(United States) Danny Ongais	Interscope Racing	March 87C	Cosworth	178	Crash	0	0
18	13	30	(United States) Al Unser Jr.	Doug Shierson Racing	March 87C	Cosworth	164	Engine	0	0
19	3	5	(United States) Mario Andretti	Newman/Haas Racing	Lola T87/00	Ilmor-Chevrolet	156	Engine	118	0
20	9	29	(United States) Pancho Carter	Machinists Union Racing	March 87C	Cosworth	132	Engine	0	0
21	4	8	(United States) Rick Mears	Penske Racing	March 86C	Ilmor-Chevrolet	109	Engine	0	0
22	20	91	(United States) Scott Brayton	Hemelgarn Racing	March 87C	Cosworth	105	Engine	0	0
23	26	11	(United States) Jeff MacPherson	Galles Racing	March 87C	Judd-Honda	92	CV joint	0	0
24	22	10	(Republic of Ireland) Derek Daly	Raynor Motorsports	Lola T87/00	Cosworth	91	Engine	0	0
25	17	23	(Canada) Ludwig Heimrath Jr.	Dick Simon Racing	Lola T87/00	Cosworth	75	Gearbox	0	0
26	2	14	(United States) A. J. Foyt	A. J. Foyt Enterprises	Lola T87/00	Cosworth	67	Gearbox	0	0
27	14	7	(United States) Kevin Cogan	Patrick Racing	March 87C	Ilmor-Chevrolet	39	Vibration	0	0
28	10	21	(United States) Johnny Rutherford	Alex Morales Motorsports	March 87C	Cosworth	36	Engine	0	0
29	28	27	(United States) Dick Ferguson	Dick Ferguson	March 85C	Cosworth	19	Gearbox	0	0
30	27	33	(United States) Tom Sneva	Mike Curb Racing	March 87C	Cosworth	5	Electrical	0	0

=== Failed to qualify ===
- (United States) Dale Coyne (#19)

=== Race statistics ===
Lap Leaders
1–35	Michael Andretti
36–39	Mario Andretti
40–42	Geoff Brabham
43–156	Mario Andretti
157–250	Michael Andretti

Cautions: 3 for 28 laps
Laps	Reason
1	Yellow flag start
7–9	Tom Sneva stopped on track
182–205	Danny Ongais and Ed Pimm crash turn 3

== Broadcasting ==
For the first time, the Michigan 500 was broadcast live by ABC. Al Trautwig was the lead play-by-play announcer. He was joined by Bobby Unser and Sam Posey. Jack Arute and Jerry Gappens reported from the pits.
