= Vince Granatelli Racing =

American auto racing team

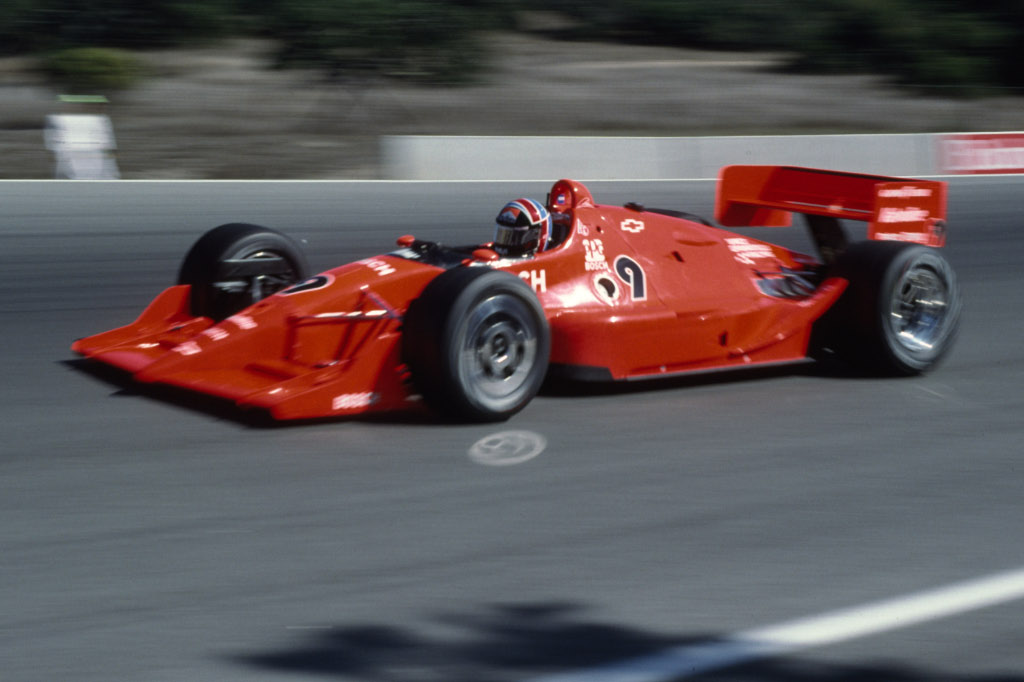
- Owner(s): Vince Granatelli; Bob Tezak (1991)
- Base: Phoenix, Arizona, United States
- Series: CART IndyCar

Career
- Debut: 1987 Toyota Grand Prix of Long Beach (Streets of Long Beach)
- Latest race: 1991 Toyota Monterey Grand Prix (Laguna Seca Raceway)
- Race victories: 4
- Pole positions: 4

Vince Granatelli Racing was an American auto racing team that competed in the CART PPG IndyCar World Series between 1987 and 1991.

The team's greatest success came in their first and final seasons, as each year, their driver (Roberto Guerrero in the former and Arie Luyendyk in the latter) each won two races during the season.

For all of the team's existence, the cars were painted in a dayglow red livery meant to be a tribute to Andy Granatelli's STP-sponsored Indy cars.

== Background ==
Vince Granatelli was the son of former car owner Andy Granatelli, whose cars had won the Indianapolis 500 in 1969 with Mario Andretti and 1973 with Gordon Johncock. In the latter year, Vince Granatelli served as the crew chief for teammate Graham McRae's car.

Vince Granatelli would start competing in racing as a car owner after Team Cotter from Dan Cotter, then owner of True Value hardware stores.

Granatelli died from complications of pneumonia and COVID-19 on January 22, 2022, at the age of 79.

== History ==
=== 1987 ===
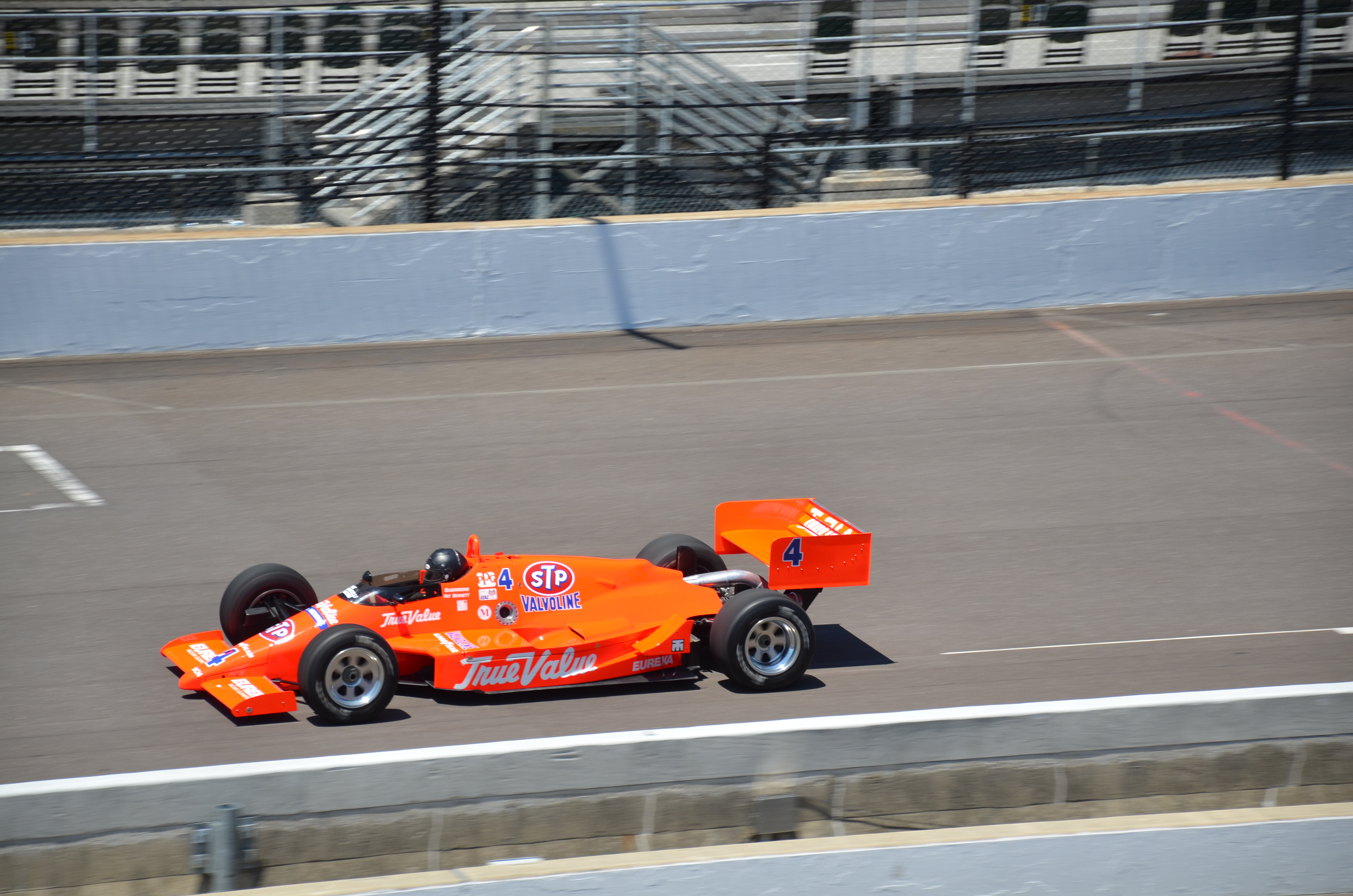
Guerrero's 1987 car in road course configuration.

The team would make their debut in 1987 with Roberto Guerrero, who had previously driven for Cotter, serving as the driver. Guerrero would drive the #4 True Value/STP March 87C-Cosworth DFX. At the season-opening Toyota Grand Prix of Long Beach on the Streets of Long Beach, Guerrero qualified in 2nd place, but finished 12th due to an engine fire after completing 88 of 95 laps.

At the second race, the Checker 200 at Phoenix International Raceway, Guerrero qualified in the second row. The car was found to be 2.5 pounds underweight and he was moved to 22nd (last) place. Guerrero first took the lead on lap 87 and ultimately led 96 of 200 laps on his way to his first victory.

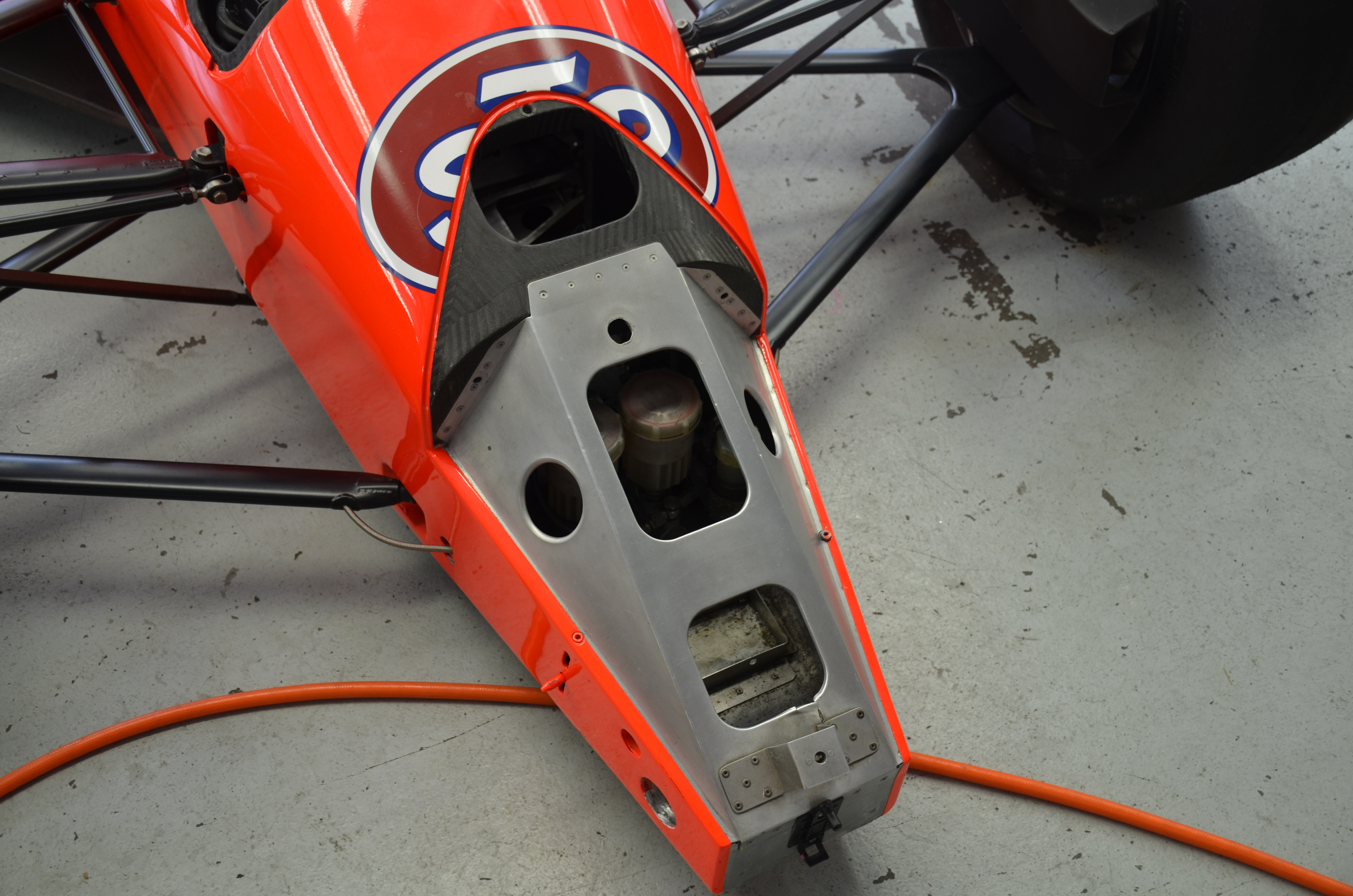
The area where Guerrero's car was damaged.

At the Indianapolis 500, Guerrero entered as a favorite alongside, Mario Andretti and Bobby Rahal. Guerrero qualified in 5th place and ran at the front of the field all race. On lap 130, Tony Bettenhausen Jr. lost a wheel and it was punted into the air by Guerrero's car. The wheel ended up landing in the top row of the grandstands in the south chute (between turns 3 and 4) and hit spectator Lyle Kurtenbach, who was killed instantly. When Andretti suffered electrical issues on lap 177, Guerrero took the lead and made his final pit stop on lap 182, as he was nearly one lap ahead of 2nd place Al Unser After the pit stop, Guerrero stalled his engine, then stalled it again after his pit crew managed to push start it. Guerrero's brake master cylinder and clutch had been damaged in the incident with Bettenhausen. During this time, Guerrero lost one lap to Unser, who was now leading, but he would unlap himself with nine laps to go. Despite a late race caution for Andretti, Guerrero would lose the race to Unser, who won a record-tying fourth Indianapolis 500.

Guerrero would then qualify on the pole position for three of the next four races. However, in these races he failed to finish better than 5th at the Budweiser Grand Prix of Cleveland at Cleveland Burke Lakefront Airport. He would then finish in the top 10 in five of the next six races. This included a win after qualifying 1st at the Escort Radar Warning 200 at Mid-Ohio Sports Car Course.

Following the race, Guerrero was ranked 3rd place in the standings, 40 points behind leader Rahal Four days after the Mid-Ohio win, Guerrero was severely injured in a crash while testing at Indianapolis Motor Speedway. On the final lap of the session, Guerrero's suspension failed and he hit the turn 2 wall. In the process, the right front tire came up and struck Guerrero, literally knocking him into next week. Guerrero would miss the remainder of the season.

Al Unser, whom Guerrero lost the Indianapolis 500 to, drove for the team at the Bosch Spark Plug Grand Prix at Pennsylvania International Raceway. He would start and finish in 10th place due to a crash with six laps to go.

Raul Boesel then drove the final two races of the season and got a best finish of 6th at the season-ending Nissan Indy Challenge at Tamiami Park. Additionally, Boesel qualified on the pole position at the exhibition race Marlboro Challenge at the same track and ultimately finished 3rd.

Despite missing the final three races of the season, Guerrero was able to finish in 4th place in the final standings with 106 points.

=== 1988 ===
Guerrero would return with the team in 1988 and would drive the #2 STP Lola T88/00-Cosworth DFX. In his first CART race back since he was injured, Guerrero started and finished 2nd at the Checker 200 at Phoenix International Raceway.

The team then received additional sponsorship from Dianetics: The Modern Science of Mental Health after it was rejected by Team Penske. Afterwards, Guerrero began to struggle for results. At the Toyota Grand Prix of Long Beach on the Streets of Long Beach, he suffered an engine failure after 41 laps and finished 19th.

At the Indianapolis 500, the team entered a second car for Gordon Johncock, the #60 STP/Diamond Head Ranch March 87C-Cosworth DFX. While Guerrero qualified in 12th place, Johncock failed to qualify. In the race, Guerrero was collected in a crash with Scott Brayton on the first lap in turn 2, resulting in a 32nd place finish for Guerrero.

During practice for the following race, the Miller High Life 200 at Wisconsin State Fair Park Speedway, Guerrero crashed in a practice and the team withdrew. Representatives from The Church of Scientology (the group behind Dianetics) speculated that Guerrero was having a mental issue with turn 2, as his 1987 crash at Indianapolis Motor Speedway and his 1988 crashes at Indianapolis and Milwaukee were in turn 2. As a result, they wanted Guerrero and his family to undergo a Scientology ritual to remove this issue. Afterwards, Granatelli ended the sponsorship, despite the group offering $500,000 per race for the remainder of the season.

Guerrero struggled as the season went on, as he only finished in the top 10 twice. The better of these results was a 3rd at the Quaker State 500 at Pocono International Raceway. During this time, the team began to alternate between using #2 and #4 and using a March 87C as the chassis in select races.

Al Unser returned to the team as a replacement for Guerrero when he was benched for the Molson Indy Toronto at Exhibition Place, finishing 9th in a Lola and the Marlboro Grand Prix at the Meadowlands at Meadowlands Sports Complex, finishing 19th in a March.

Guerrero would finish 12th in points with 40 points. Following the season, he left the team for Morales Motorsports.

After the season, Granatelli was critical of CART for making Cosworth engines uncompetitive by lowering their boost from 48 inches to 45 inches and he threatened to withdraw from the series.

=== 1989 ===
For 1989, the team fielded the #9 STP Lola T88/00-Buick 3300 V6 with Tom Sneva starting off as the regular driver. Sneva would crash in practice for the season-opening Checker Autoworks 200 at Phoenix International Raceway and would fail to qualify as a result. For the second race, the Toyota Grand Prix of Long Beach at the Streets of Long Beach, an older March 86C was used as a replacement and Sneva finished in 10th place, albeit five laps down.

At the Indianapolis 500, Sneva's car was renumbered to #7 (due to USAC sanctioning the race) and John Andretti drove a second car, the #70 STP/Tuneup Masters Lola T88/00-Buick 3300 V6. The team considered entering a third for Guerrero, as Morales Motorsports was unable to have their Alfa Romeo engine ready in time, but were unable to due to Guerrero's contract. Andretti started 12th, but finished 25th due to an engine failure after 61 laps and Sneva started 22nd and finished 27th due to a pit fire after completing 55 laps.

Sneva struggled with the team as he retired from each of the following five races. During this time, the team used a Cosworth DFX in the March at the Budweiser/G.I. Joe's 200 at Portland International Raceway and the Buick engine in the March at the Budweiser Grand Prix of Cleveland at Cleveland Burke Lakefront Airport.

Andretti was then brought back to the team to replace Sneva and bring alternate input on the car for races that did not conflict with his IMSA FT Championship commitments. He would fail to finish better than 17th at the Pocono 500 at Pocono International Raceway.

Didier Theys then drove the final four races in the main car. He would finish 11th at both the Red Roof Inns 200 at Mid-Ohio Sports Car Course and the Road America 200 at Road America.

Granatelli would also enter the second car for Andretti at the final two races of the season. He would finish 12th at the Champion Spark Plug 300K at Laguna Seca Raceway.

Theys would finish 21st in points with nine points (he also drove for Arciero Racing and Hemelgarn Racing earlier in the year), Sneva would finish 28th with three points and Andretti 31st with one point.

=== 1990 ===
In 1990, Theys returned to drive the #9 Tuneup Masters Lola T88/00-Buick 3300 V6 for the team in a part-time season. He would finish 11th at the Toyota Grand Prix of Long Beach on the Streets of Long Beach.

At the Indianapolis 500, Sneva returned to the team to drive the #9 RCA Penske PC17-Buick 3300 V6, Kevin Cogan drove the #11 Tuneup Masters Penske PC17-Buick 3300 V6 and Theys drove the #70 Tuneup Masters Penske PC17-Buick 3300 V6. On the first day of practice, Sneva was the fastest driver with a top speed of 215.646 miles per hour. Cogan would qualify 15th, Theys 20th and Sneva 25th. In the race, Sneva suffered a cv joint failure after 48 laps and finished 30th, while Theys finished 11th, 10 laps down, and Cogan was 9th, nine laps down.

For the rest of the season, Theys returned to the main car and got a best finish of 7th place at the Molson Indy Toronto at Exhibition Place. Theys finished 18th in points with 15 points, Cogan finished 23rd with four points and Sneva was 34th with no points.

Granatelli would admit that in regards to the season and the team's recent fortunes, "It was no fun to be running for 10th place every race, with no hope of finishing much higher."

=== 1991 ===
Prior to the 1991 season, Granatelli merged his team with Doug Shierson Racing, which Bob Tezak, founder of International Games, had recently purchased. The newly merged team competed as Uno/Granatelli Racing. Arie Luyendyk, who had been driving for Shierson, drove for the team in the #9 Uno Lola T91/00-Chevrolet Indy V8 265A. The team was effectively running unsponsored as Uno was at the time a product of International Games.

At the season-opening Gold Coast IndyCar Grand Prix at the Surfers Paradise Street Circuit, Luyendyk started 8th and finished 9th, one lap down. He then finished 5th at the Toyota Grand Prix of Long Beach on the Streets of Long Beach.

Luyendyk would then win the Valvoline 200 at Phoenix International Raceway after leading 129 of 200 laps.

At the Indianapolis 500, Luyendyk's car number became #1 (as the race was sanctioned by USAC and Luyendyk had won the race the previous year). The team would receive sponsorship from RCA. The team intended to field a second car with Al Unser as the driver, but the team ultimately decided to not take away focus from Luyendyk, despite the engine lease being waived. Luyendyk was the 3rd fastest qualifier, but would ultimately start in 14th place, due to being a second day qualify and starting behind the Pole Day qualifiers. In the race, Luyendyk finished in 3rd place, one lap down.

Following Indianapolis, the team struggled for sponsorship, with Luyendyk failing to receive his share of the prize money for Indianapolis from Tezak (Luyendyk successfully sued Tezak for the money). During the weekend of the Budweiser/G.I. Joe's 200 at Portland International Raceway, where Luyendyk finished 7th, Tezak announced he was pulling funding from the team, meaning Granatelli had to start funding the car with his own money. Then during the weekend of the Marlboro Grand Prix Meadowlands at Meadowlands Sports Complex, where Luyendyk finished 18th due to gearbox issues, Granatelli announced that the team may not compete past the Marlboro 500 at Michigan International Speedway due to sponsorship issues, despite Luyendyk being ranked 6th in points at the time.

At Michigan, Tezak tried to prevent the team from competing, as they had removed the Uno sponsorship by this point. However, Granatelli received an injunction to compete. Luyendyk qualified at a speed of 222.910 miles per hour, the 7th fastest. However, because he did not qualify on the first qualifying day, he started 20th out of 21 cars. In the race, he led 52 of 250 laps, but received a stop-and-go-penalty for passing under caution. Despite this, Luyendyk finished 2nd.

In spite of having no sponsor, the team competed in each race that season. Luyendyk would manage to win the Bosch Spark Plugs Grand Prix at Pennsylvania International Raceway.

Luyendyk would ultimately finish in 6th place in the final standings with 134 points.

Despite the team's success, Granatelli shut it down due to a lack of funding.

== IndyCar wins ==
#	Season	Date	Sanction	Track / Race	No.	Winning driver	Chassis	Engine	Tire	Grid	Laps Led
1	1987	April 12	CART	Phoenix International Raceway (O)	4	(Colombia) Roberto Guerrero	March 87C	Cosworth DFX V8t	Goodyear	22	96
2	1987	September 6	CART	Mid-Ohio Sports Car Course (R)	4	(Colombia) Roberto Guerrero (2)	March 87C	Cosworth DFX V8t	Goodyear	Pole	12
3	1991	April 21	CART	Phoenix International Raceway (O)	9	(Netherlands) Arie Luyendyk	Lola T91/00	Chevrolet 265A V8t	Goodyear	9	129
4	1991	October 6	CART	Nazareth Speedway (O)	9	(Netherlands) Arie Luyendyk (2)	Lola T91/00	Chevrolet 265A V8t	Goodyear	11	6
