= Penske PC-16 =

The Penske PC-16 was a CART open-wheel race car, designed by Penske Racing, which was constructed for competition in the 1987 season. The chassis debuted with poor results at the season-opening races, and struggled mightily to get up to speed at Indianapolis. Midway through the first week of practice, the Penske team parked the PC-16 in favor of their backup cars, a contingent of March 86C chassis.

Designer Alan Jenkins was fired from Penske, and later replaced with Nigel Bennett.

== Gallery ==
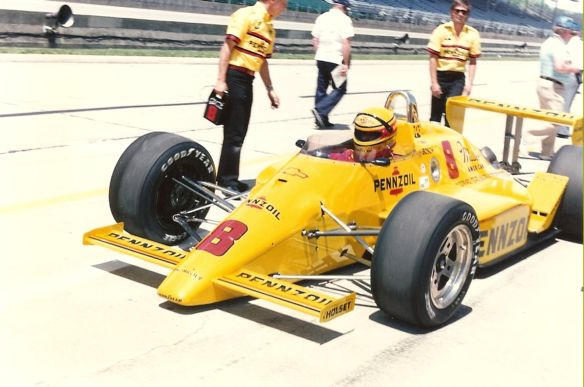
Rick Mears in a Penske PC-16 chassis during the first week of practice for the 1987 Indianapolis 500.

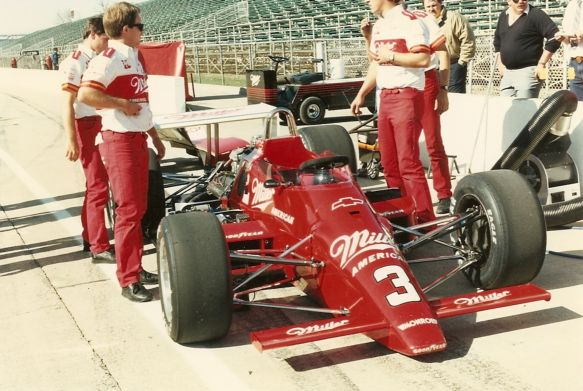
Danny Sullivan in a Penske PC-16 chassis during the first week of practice for the 1987 Indianapolis 500.

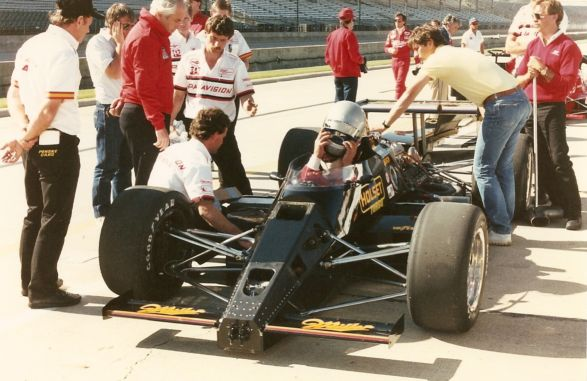
Danny Ongais in a Penske PC-16 chassis during the first week of practice for the 1987 Indianapolis 500.

== Complete Indy Car World Series results ==
(key)

Year	Entrant	Engine	Tyres	Driver	No.	1	2	3	4	5	6	7	8	9	10	11	12	13	14	15	Points	D.C.
1987	Penske Racing	Chevrolet 265A V8t	G			LBH	PHX	INDY	MIL	POR	MEA	CLE	TOR	MCH	POC	ROA	MDO	NAZ	LAG	MIA		
1987	Penske Racing	Chevrolet 265A V8t	G	(United States) Danny Sullivan	3	22	11	Wth		11	20										87*	9th*
1987	Penske Racing	Chevrolet 265A V8t	G	(United States) Rick Mears	8	9	20	Wth		3	18	7	10								102*	5th*
1987	Penske Racing	Chevrolet 265A V8t	G	(United States) Al Unser	9															DNQ	39*	13th*
1987	Interscope Racing	Chevrolet 265A V8t	G	(United States) Danny Ongais	25			Wth													0*	42nd*

*Includes points scored by other cars.
