= Ludwig Heimrath =

Canadian former race car driver (born 1956)

Ludwig Heimrath Jr. (born September 9, 1956) is a Canadian businessman and former race car driver in open-wheel and sports-car racing.

Born in Scarborough, Ontario, Heimrath started his driving career racing go-karts and Formula Fords. In 1979 and 1980, he won the Ontario Formula Ford Championship winning seven races in total. In 1981 and 1982, he competed in selected International Motorsport Association (IMSA) races. In 1983, he competed in the Robert Bosch Super Vee Series. Ludwig was named Rookie of the Year winning a race and two pole positions. He also drove a prototype in the 24 Hours of Le Mans that year. In 1984, he won three races and three pole positions racing Super Vees. The next several years, Heimrath competed in the IMSA GTP Series and drove a factory supported Porsche in Trans-Am. Starting in 1987 through 1989, Heimrath competed in selected CART races. In 1987, at the Indianapolis 500, he was the fastest qualifier the second weekend, qualifying tenth. His highest finish at the Indy 500 was 13th.

Heimrath graduated as an engineer from Ryerson Polytechnical Institute (now Toronto Metropolitan University). He currently owns and operates All-Composite, Inc., a composite manufacturing company in the Pacific Northwest. He also is a college composite technology instructor and consultant.

Heimrath is married to Kathy Rude, the first woman to win a major international sports car race, a GTU class win at 24 Hours of Daytona in 1982 with Lee Mueller and Allan Moffat. Heimrath's father, Ludwig Heimrath Sr., won the Trans Am Series championship in 1977, becoming the first person born outside the United States to win the championship since Horst Kwech in 1966.

== American open-wheel racing results ==
(key)

=== PPG Indycar Series ===
(key) (Races in bold indicate pole position)

Year	Team	1	2	3	4	5	6	7	8	9	10	11	12	13	14	15	16	Rank	Points	Ref
1984	Canadian Tire Racing	LBH	PHX	INDY	MIL	POR	MEA	CLE	MCH	ROA; 23	POC	MDO	SAN	MCH	PHX	LAG	CPL	NC	0	
1985	Truesports Co.	LBH	INDY	MIL	POR	MEA	CLE	MCH	ROA	POC	MDO; 26	SAN	MCH	LAG	PHX	MIA		NC	0	
1987	Dick Simon Racing	LBH; 15	PHX; 22	INDY; 30	MIL; 10	POR; 12	MEA; 17	CLE; 18	TOR; 19	MCH; 25	POC; 12	ROA	MDO; 26	NAZ				34th	5	
1987	Arciero Racing														LAG; 23	MIA; DNQ		34th	5	
1988	Hemelgarn Racing	PHX	LBH; 14	INDY; 25	MIL	POR; 23	CLE; 26	TOR; 19	MEA; 12	MCH	POC	MDO; 19	ROA; 21	NAZ	LAG	MIA; 7		28th	7	
1989	Hemelgarn Racing	PHX; 9	LBH; 24	INDY; 13	MIL; DNS	DET	POR	CLE	MEA	TOR; 22	MCH; DNQ	POC	MDO; 25	ROA; 17	NAZ; 17	LAG; DNQ		26th	4	

=== Indianapolis 500 ===
Year	Chassis	Engine	Start	Finish	Team
1987	Lola	Cosworth	10	30	Dick Simon Racing
1988	Lola	Cosworth	31	25	Hemelgarn Racing
1989	Lola	Judd	18	13	Hemelgarn Racing

== Le Mans 24 Hours results ==
Year	Team	Co-Drivers	Car	Class	Laps	Pos.	Class Pos.
1983	(Switzerland) Brun Motorsport	(Canada) David Deacon (Canada) Jacques Villeneuve	Sehcar C6–Cosworth	Group C	68	DNF	DNF

== See also ==
List of Canadians in Champ Car
