= Jeff MacPherson =

American racing driver

Jeffrey Archer MacPherson (born June 9, 1956, in Santa Ana, California) is a former driver in the CART Championship Car series. He raced in the 1986 and 1987 seasons, with 18 career starts, including the 1987 Indianapolis 500. He finished in the top-ten five times, with his best finish in 8th position in 1987 at both Indianapolis and Milwaukee. He also finished 8th in the 1987 championship. Prior to CART, he raced in US Formula Super Vee in 1984 and 1985 and drove in four races (and had three DNQ's) in the FIA Formula 3000 series in 1986 for the short-lived Bennett team with a best finish of 8th at Silverstone.

== Racing record ==
=== American open–wheel racing results ===
(key) (Races in bold indicate pole position; races in italics indicate fastest lap.)

==== Indy Car World Series ====
Year	Team	1	2	3	4	5	6	7	8	9	10	11	12	13	14	15	16	17	Rank	Points	Ref
1986	Arciero Racing	PHX1	LBH	INDY	MIL	POR	MEA	CLE	TOR	MIS1	POC	MDO; 22	SAN	MIS2	ROA; 15	LAG; 13	PHX2; Wth	MIA	**37th**	**0**	
1987	Galles Racing	LBH; 10	PHX; 13	INDY; 8	MIL; 8	POR; 13	MEA; 21	CLE; 17	TOR; 22	MIS; 23	POC; 20	ROA; 25	MDO; 21	NAZ; 9	LAG; 9	MIA; 24			**19th**	**21**	
