= 1987 Indianapolis 500 =

American motor race

71st Indianapolis 500
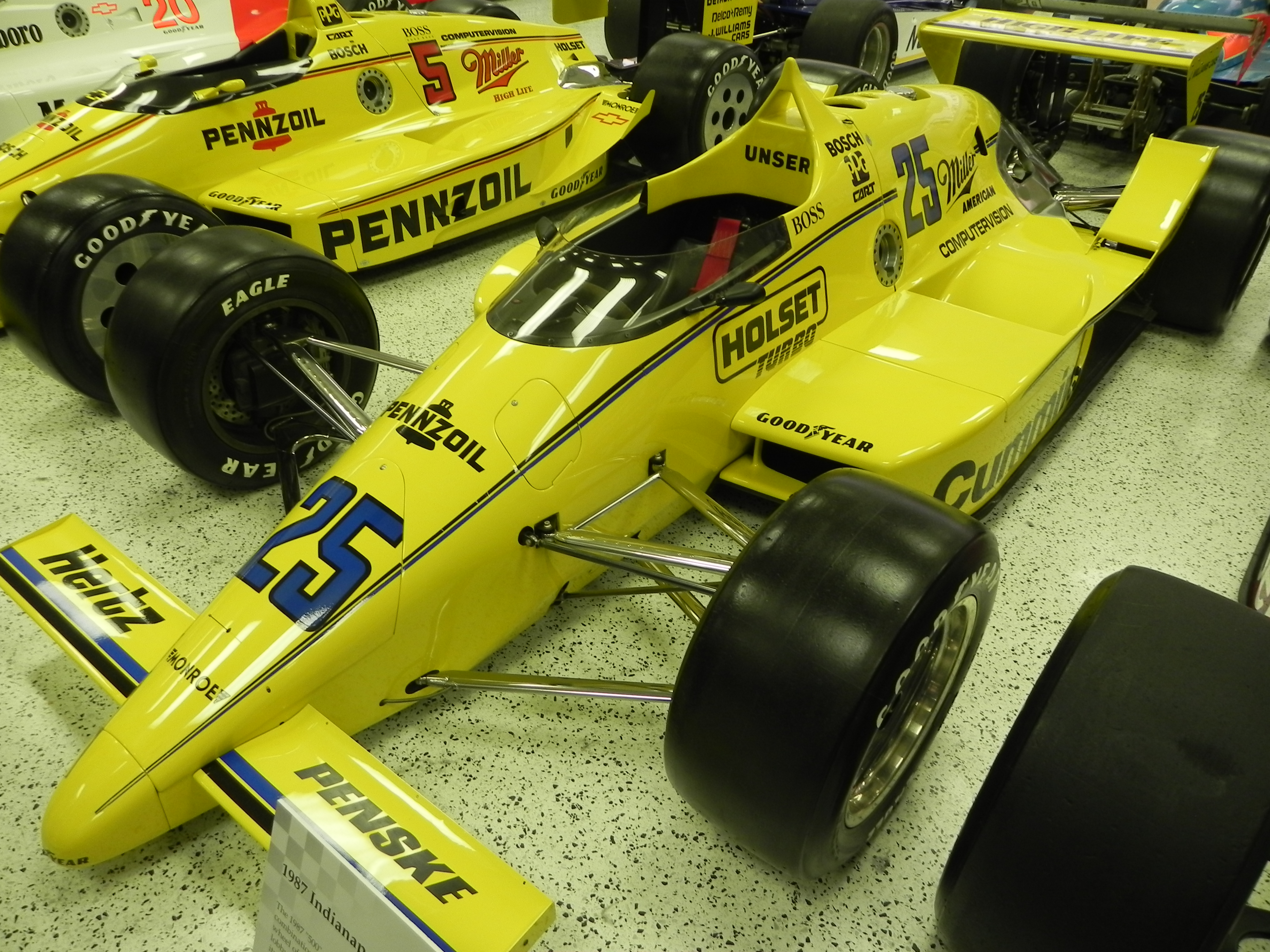

Indianapolis Motor Speedway

Indianapolis 500
- Sanctioning body: USAC
- Season: 1987 CART season 1986–87 Gold Crown
- Date: May 24, 1987
- Winner: (United States) Al Unser Sr.
- Winning team: Penske Racing
- Winning Chief Mechanic: Clive Howell
- Time of race: 3:04:59.147
- Average speed: 162.175 mph
- Pole position: (United States) Mario Andretti
- Pole speed: 215.390 mph
- Fastest qualifier: (United States) Mario Andretti
- Rookie of the Year: (Italy) Fabrizio Barbazza
- Most laps led: (United States) Mario Andretti (170)
- Fastest Lap: (Colombia) Roberto Guerrero (205.011 mph)

Pre-race ceremonies
- National anthem: Sandi Patty
- "Back Home Again in Indiana": Jim Nabors
- Starting command: Mary F. Hulman
- Pace car: Chrysler LeBaron
- Pace car driver: Carroll Shelby
- Starter: Duane Sweeney
- Estimated attendance: 400,000

Television in the United States
- Network: ABC
- Announcers: Host: Jim McKay; Lap-by-lap: Jim Lampley; Color Analyst: Sam Posey; Color Analyst: Bobby Unser
- Nielsen ratings: 11.0 / 36

Chronology
Previous	Next
1986	1988

The 71st Indianapolis 500 was held at the Indianapolis Motor Speedway in Speedway, Indiana, on Sunday May 24, 1987. After dominating practice, qualifying, and most of the race, leader Mario Andretti slowed with mechanical problems with only 23 laps to go. Five laps later, Al Unser Sr. assumed the lead, and won his record-tying fourth Indianapolis 500 victory. At age 47, just days short of his 48th birthday, Unser became the oldest winner of the Indy 500, a record that still stands as of 2026. Seeking his long-awaited second "500" victory, Andretti had led 170 of the first 177 laps, and at one point, had lapped the entire field. His failure to win reflected on the Andretti curse, and in an ironic twist, his act of slowing down to preserve his engine developed a harmonic imbalance which broke a valve spring. Despite dropping out, due to high attrition, Andretti still placed 9th, his eighth career top ten at Indy.

During the month of May, an unusually high 25 crashes occurred during practice and qualifying, with one driver in particular, Jim Crawford, suffering serious leg injuries. Dennis Firestone suffered a fractured neck and a concussion, which ended his racing career. The abundance of crashes was attributed to a combination of no rain (resulting in a greasy, slippery track), the introduction of Goodyear's radial tires, increased turbulence, and handling difficulties with the March 87C.

Al Unser's victory is considered one of the biggest upsets in Indianapolis 500 history. Unser, whose driving career was beginning to wind down, had dropped down to part-time status a year earlier. He entered the 1987 month of May without a ride and without sponsorship money, which left him on the sidelines during the first week of practice. After Danny Ongais suffered a concussion in a practice crash, Unser was hired by Penske to fill the vacant seat. Unser proceeded to win the race with a year-old March 86C chassis, and the venerable Cosworth DFX, the powerplant's tenth consecutive Indy victory. Unser's car, originally entered as a back-up, had been sitting in a hotel lobby in Reading, Pennsylvania, as a show car just weeks prior.

The race was sanctioned by the United States Auto Club, and was included as part of the 1987 CART PPG Indy Car World Series. Of the notable statistics, the 1987 Indy 500 was the first such where the entry list did not include a single car built in the United States.

During the race, a spectator was killed when an errant tire was hit into the grandstand, the first spectator fatality at the event in a racing-related incident since 1938.

== Background ==
Defending Indy 500 winner Bobby Rahal went on to win the 1986 CART championship. During the offseason, his Truesports racing team made a highly publicized switch from the March chassis to the up-and-coming Lola chassis. Truesports, however, stayed with the proven Cosworth engine. Rahal was a strong favorite to repeat as winner.

For 1987, the Ilmor-Chevrolet 265-A engine expanded its participation in Indy car racing. Penske Racing fielded a three-car effort with the powerplant, while resuming its in-house chassis program. The PC-16 chassis was the primary car for the team, but as a backup, three one-year-old March 86C chassis were also entered. Newman/Haas Racing joined the Ilmor Chevrolet program, pairing the engine with a Lola T87. With it, Mario Andretti scored the engine's first victory a month earlier at Long Beach. Patrick Racing (Emerson Fittipaldi & Kevin Cogan) was the third team to utilize the Ilmor Chevrolet, but they used the March 87C chassis.

Roberto Guerrero won the second race of the season, held at Phoenix. Guerrero was a rising star on the circuit, and the impressive victory from last starting position at Phoenix made him a favorite for Indy. For 1987, his Vince Granatelli Racing team was sporting a special paint job, a "throwback" day-glow orange which resembled the Andy Granatelli entries from the late 1960s and early 1970s.

A new engine arrived at Indianapolis in 1987. The Judd AV V-8 was badged as the Brabham-Honda, and was fielded by Galles Racing. After part-time use during the 1986 CART season, the engine was utilized full-time beginning in 1987. Indy veteran Geoff Brabham, son of Jack Brabham (co-founder of Engine Developments Ltd.) and rookie Jeff MacPherson were the drivers.

At Penske Racing, Rick Mears and Danny Sullivan returned as the full-time entries. During the offseason, three-time Indy 500 winner (1970, 1971, 1978), and three-time national champion (1970, 1983, 1985) Al Unser Sr. retired from full-time driving duties. Unser had been driving for Penske from 1983 to 1986, and was still interested in driving part-time, particularly at Indianapolis and the other 500-mile races (Michigan and Pocono). Meanwhile, businessman and media mogul Ted Field arranged a deal with Roger Penske to field Indy veteran Danny Ongais in the third Penske entry. Al Unser was unable to secure a ride before the month of May, and arrived at the track unemployed, albeit shopping around for a competitive car.

Goodyear arrived at the Indianapolis Motor Speedway for the first time with a new radial tire. After a few years of development in the CART series, the radials were ready for competition in the Indy 500.

The most noticeable construction project completed at the Indianapolis Motor Speedway for 1987 was a series of electronic dot matrix scoreboards installed around the track.

== Race schedule ==
Race schedule – April/May 1987
Sun	Mon	Tue	Wed	Thu	Fri	Sat
19	20	21	22	23	24; ROP	25; ROP
26; ROP	27	28	29	30	1	2 Practice
3 Practice	4 Practice	5 Practice	6 Practice	7 Practice	8 Practice	9 Pole Day
10; Time Trials	11; Practice	12; Practice	13; Practice	14; Practice	15; Practice	16; Time Trials
17; Bump Day	18	19	20	21; Carb Day	22; Mini-Marathon	23; Parade
24; Indy 500	25; Memorial Day	26	27	28	29	30
31						

Color	Notes
Green	Practice
Dark Blue	Time trials
Silver	Race day
Red	Rained out*
Blank	No track activity

* Includes days where track
activity was significantly
limited due to rain

ROP – denotes Rookie
Orientation Program

== Practice – week 1 ==
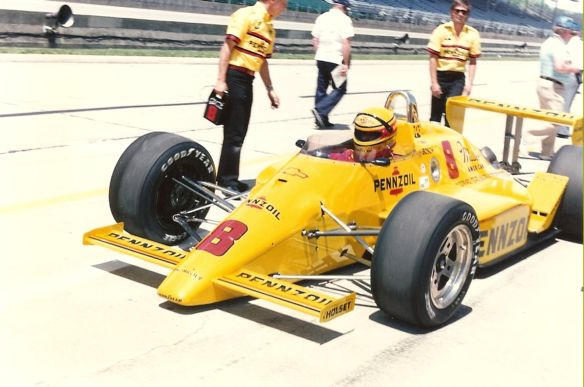
Rick Mears in a Penske PC-16 chassis during the first week of practice

=== Saturday May 2 ===
Practice started on Opening Day, Saturday May 2. Rookie Ludwig Heimrath Jr. was the first car on the track. A somewhat light day of activity saw several drivers pass their rookie tests. Michael Andretti posted the fastest lap of the day, at 210.772 mph (339.205 km/h). His father Mario, however, did not take any laps.

=== Sunday May 3 ===
The second day of practice saw increased activity. Mario Andretti posted the fastest lap of the day at 213.371 mph (343.387 km/h). Later in the day, the weather cooled, and wind picked up. At 5:58 p.m., Pancho Carter suffered a spectacular crash. His car spun in turn three, air got underneath, and flipped upside-down. The car landed on the pavement on its roll bar, and proceeded to skid about 600 feet (180 m) through the north chute. The car hit the outside wall in turn four, and came to a rest still upside-down. Carter, however, was not seriously injured. His helmet had three major scrapes from rubbing along the pavement. Carter later proudly showed off the helmet, showing where he had rotated his head to spread the abrasion damage.

=== Monday May 4 ===
High winds kept the speeds down. Dennis Firestone and Roberto Guerrero tied for fast lap of the day (211.565 mph), while Mario Andretti was third.

=== Tuesday May 5 ===
Tuesday saw the fastest lap in Indy history to date. Mario Andretti blistered the track at an unofficial track record of 218.204 mph (351.165 km/h). It made him the favorite for the pole position. The next fastest time, turned in by Bobby Rahal was a full 5 miles per hour (8.0 km/h) slower. The second crash of the month occurred, involving Dennis Firestone. He spun and crashed in turn four, breaking bones in his left foot and fracturing his left leg, eventually this crash with a second crash would sideline him for the month, and end his driving career.

=== Wednesday May 6 ===
Four crashes occurred during practice on Wednesday. Kevin Cogan drifted high exiting turn 1, and crashed into the outside wall. Later, Scott Brayton hit the wall in turn four. Derek Daly and Dick Ferguson both brushed the wall in the south short chutes, but both nursed their cars back to the pits. None of the four drivers were seriously injured. Mario Andretti continued his dominance of practice, leading the speed charts again, at 216.502 mph (348.426 km/h). A surprising second-fastest was Jim Crawford, driving a Buick-powered 1986 March to a lap of 215.982 mph (347.589 km/h). Cogan, Brayton, and Daly were all driving 1987 March chassis. By mid-week, teams fielding the 1987 March chassis were finding the cars difficult to handle with the new Goodyear radial tires. Coupled with the warmer temperatures, and often windy conditions, many teams were finding the search for speed difficult.

=== Thursday May 7 ===
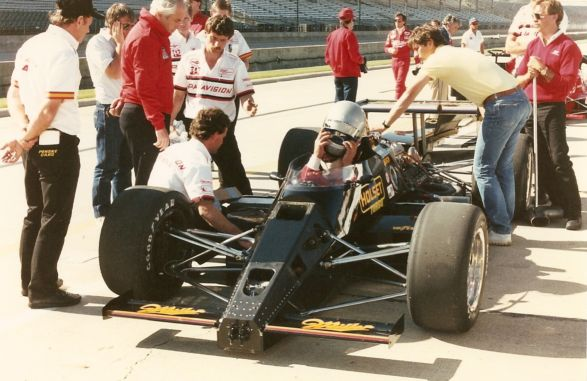
Danny Ongais during practice prior to his accident

Breezy conditions continued on Thursday. The most serious crash of the month to date occurred less than an hour into the day. Danny Ongais, driving the third Penske entry, crashed hard into the outside wall in turn 4. He suffered a concussion and was sidelined for the rest of the month. The crash added to the frustration the Penske team was having so far during the month. While they were having little trouble with the Ilmor Chevrolet engine, the PC-16 chassis was deemed a lemon. Rick Mears and Danny Sullivan were struggling to keep pace, and were rarely amongst the top ten each day on the speed chart. Meanwhile, Mario Andretti continued to top the speed chart, again by 2 mph (3.2 km/h), with a lap at 218.234 mph (351.214 km/h). Rocky Moran upped the crash tally for the week to eight, when he crashed exiting turn 2.

Late in the afternoon of May 7, Penske Racing decided to park the PC-16 chassis in favor of their stable of 1986 Marches. However, none were presently at the track, nor immediately race ready. In some cases, they were serving as show cars. The first car would arrive the following morning, and Rick Mears and Danny Sullivan flipped a coin to see who would drive it. Mears won the toss.

=== "Fast" Friday May 8 ===
The final day of practice before Pole Day was warm and windy. Mario Andretti led the speed chart once again (216.242 mph), but Bobby Rahal was a close second (215.568 mph). Four more crashes occurred, bringing the total for the month to twelve. Tom Sneva crashed exiting turn one. Dick Ferguson crashed for the second time, and suffered major damage. Gary Bettenhausen spun, and Phil Krueger suffered rear suspension damage after tagging the turn four wall.

== Time trials – weekend 1 ==
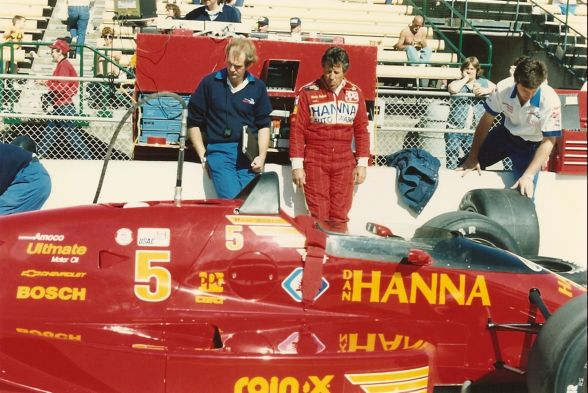
Pole-sitter Mario Andretti waits by his car during a practice session.

=== Pole day qualifying – Saturday May 9 ===
During morning practice on Saturday May 9, Bobby Rahal led the speed chart at 216.609 mph (348.598 km/h). Mario Andretti was second-fastest. Rick Mears, who only a day earlier stepped into a 1986 March, already had the car up to speed at 213.371 mph (343.387 km/h). Stan Fox was involved in the 13th crash of the month, when he spun out of turn three and tapped the inside wall.

Hot, slick, and windy conditions were observed during pole day. Many teams who had struggled during the week with handling problems, sat idle on pole day, waiting for better track conditions. The first two cars waved off, and Rick Mears became the first car in the field at 211.467 mph (340.323 km/h).

Bobby Rahal tentatively secured the top spot with a run of 213.316 mph (343.299 km/h). Over the next hour and a half, five cars started runs, but all were waved off. By 1 p.m., there were still only two cars in the field.

At 1:09 p.m., Mario Andretti took to the track. Despite hot and slick conditions, and gusty winds, Andretti took the pole position with a speed of 215.390 mph (346.637 km/h). Andretti's run was "nerve-wracking", inconsistent, and at times he lost traction, but the battle for the pole was settled. After Andretti's run, sparse activity took place until late in the day. Most teams stayed off the track altogether. Veteran drivers, Johnny Rutherford and Dick Simon managed successful runs, and filled the field to five cars.

Jim Crawford, a darkhorse favorite for the front row in a Buick entry, made his first attempt at 2:25 p.m. The crew waved off after a slower-than-expected speed. A little over an hour later, Crawford returned to the track. After a quick warm-up lap, he lost control in turn one, and hit the wall nose-first. He suffered severe injuries, fractures to both ankles, a fractured lower right shin, and a fractured left knee. He would be sidelined for an entire year. Johnny Parsons also brushed the wall in turn 2 during a practice run, upping the total to 15 accidents during the month.

Late in the day, several veterans took to the track in an attempt to qualify. Among the fastest were Roberto Guerrero and Arie Luyendyk. Shortly after 5 p.m., A. J. Foyt qualified in 4th position, extending his streak to a record thirty consecutive Indy 500 races. With reluctance, Danny Sullivan completed a slow qualifying run in his PC-16/Chevrolet. It was a strategic move, in order to secure Sullivan a tentative spot in the field in case time trials were rained out on the second weekend.

At the close of pole day, only eleven cars had completed qualifying runs. With Andretti, Rahal, and Mears taking the top three spots, it was the first time since 1975 that the front row consisted of all former winners (and only the second time ever). With A. J. Foyt qualifying fourth, it was also the first time that former winners swept the top four positions. Rick Mears surprised observers by putting a year-old car (with only two days of shake-down practice) on the outside of the front row, his record seventh front row start. Veteran Dick Simon enjoyed his first start in the front two rows by qualifying 6th. The Ilmor-Chevy Indy V-8 engine won the qualifying battle, placing machines 1st and 3rd, while Cosworth's best car (Rahal) was 2nd.

=== Second day qualifying – Sunday May 10 ===
Three more crashes occurred on Sunday May 10, lifting the total for the month to 18. The most serious by Tom Sneva, his second crash in three days.

Former winner Gordon Johncock was announced as the replacement for the injured Jim Crawford. Johncock initially retired before the 1985 race, but had tentative plans for a return in 1986. Johncock was expected to immediately begin practicing on the track.

The second day of time trials opened with two attempts, by rookie Ludwig Heimrath Jr. and Rich Vogler. Over an hour and half hour later, more cars lined up to qualify. By the end of the day, the field was filled to 18 cars, with Heimrath the fastest of the afternoon. Among those not yet in the field were Al Unser Jr., Tom Sneva, and Kevin Cogan.

== Practice – week 2 ==
=== Monday May 11 ===
Gordon Johncock took to the track for his first stint of laps at speed. At night, the first significant rain in many days washed the track of some rubber buildup. Mario Andretti (211.714 mph) was the fastest car of the day.

=== Tuesday May 12 ===
Penske Racing driver Danny Ongais was officially withdrawn from his entry. Following his crash on May 7, Ongais was diagnosed with a concussion, and was not medically cleared to drive. No replacement was yet announced, but Al Unser was rumored as the choice.

Track activity was leisurely, with Mario Andretti leading the speed chart at 212.916 in a back-up car. Rookie Fabrizio Barbazza was the fastest driver not yet qualified at 206.091. Dominic Dobson, another rookie, used the afternoon to finish the final phases of his rookie test.

=== Wednesday May 13 ===
Three-time Indy 500 winner Al Unser Sr. was officially announced as the replacement for the injured Danny Ongais at Penske Racing. Unser took his first laps of the month, driving a newly arrived 1986 March/Cosworth. Unser had entered the month unemployed, and was at the track supporting his son Al Unser Jr. in his efforts at Doug Shierson Racing, all the while shopping around the garage area for a competitive ride for himself.

Al Unser Jr. had been struggling to get his 1987 March/Cosworth up to speed during the first week of practice, and was unable to qualify during the first weekend of time trials. Unser Sr. had planned to go home to Albuquerque by Monday, if he had not yet secured a ride. But he decided to stay through the week to help his son Unser Jr. get his car up to speed. About a day later, he was approached to drive for Penske.

Al Unser Sr.'s Penske Racing teammate Danny Sullivan started taking laps for the first time in a 1986 March chassis, powered by an Ilmor Chevrolet Indy V-8. Plans were being made to withdraw Sullivan's PC-16/Chevrolet from the qualified field, and re-qualify in the year-old March. Meanwhile, Penske was already prepping a third 1986 March for Unser, but his would be powered by a Cosworth engine.

Late in the day Geoff Brabham broke a wheel, and slid into the wall in turn three. It was the 19th crash of the month.

=== Thursday May 14 ===
Al Unser Jr., after two weeks of struggling with speed, led the non-qualified cars at 208.913 mph (336.213 km/h). Mario Andretti continued to practice in his back-up car, posting the fourth-fastest speed of the day. Two single-car crashes by Johnny Parsons and Rick Miaskiewicz respectively, brought the total of the month to 21 crashes. Parsons suffered a broken ankle, and was sidelined for the rest of the month.

=== Friday May 15 ===
The final regular day of practice took place on Friday May 15. Dennis Firestone suffered his second crash in a week, and 22nd overall for the month. In turn four, he slid into the outside wall, suffering a neck fracture and concussion. This would sideline him for the remainder of the month, and end his driving career. Al Unser Jr. again led the non-qualified cars at 210.231 mph (338.334 km/h).

== Time trials – weekend 2 ==
=== Third day qualifying – Saturday May 16 ===
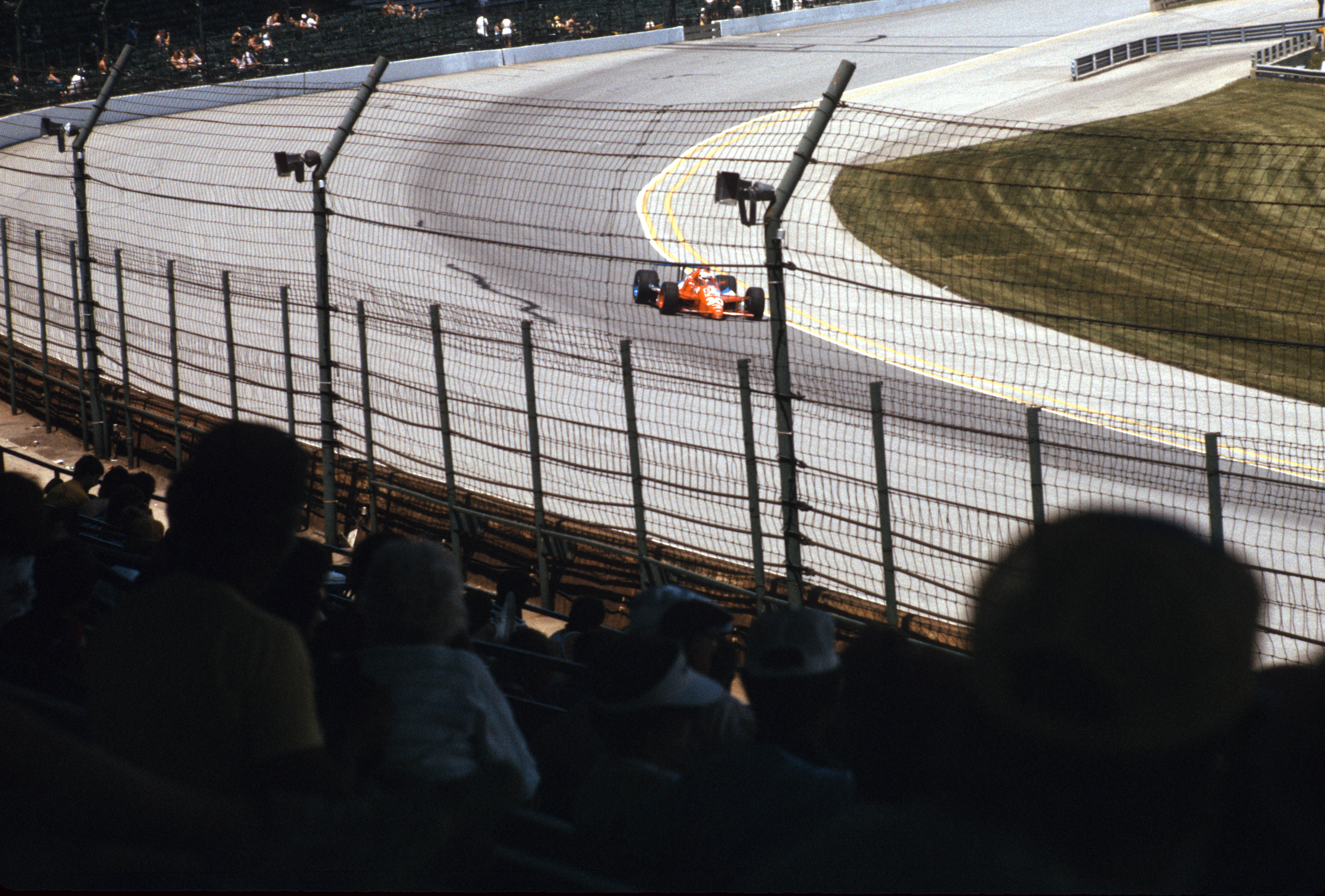
Al Unser Jr. making a qualification attempt

The third day of time trials took place on May 16. Several veteran drivers, as well as a couple rookies, completed qualifying runs. By the end of the day, the field was filled to 30 cars.

Among the veterans qualifying early on were Al Unser Jr., Gordon Johncock, and Al Unser Sr. Danny Sullivan withdrew his already-qualified PC-16/Chevrolet, and re-qualified with a 1986 March/Chevrolet. His qualifying speed increased by 5 miles per hour (8.0 km/h).

Late in the afternoon, Kevin Cogan made the field, as well as Tony Bettehausen. After suffering two crashes during practice, Tom Sneva finally put a car in the field at over 207 mph (333 km/h). Shortly thereafter, the track closed for the day.

=== Bump day qualifying – Sunday May 17 ===
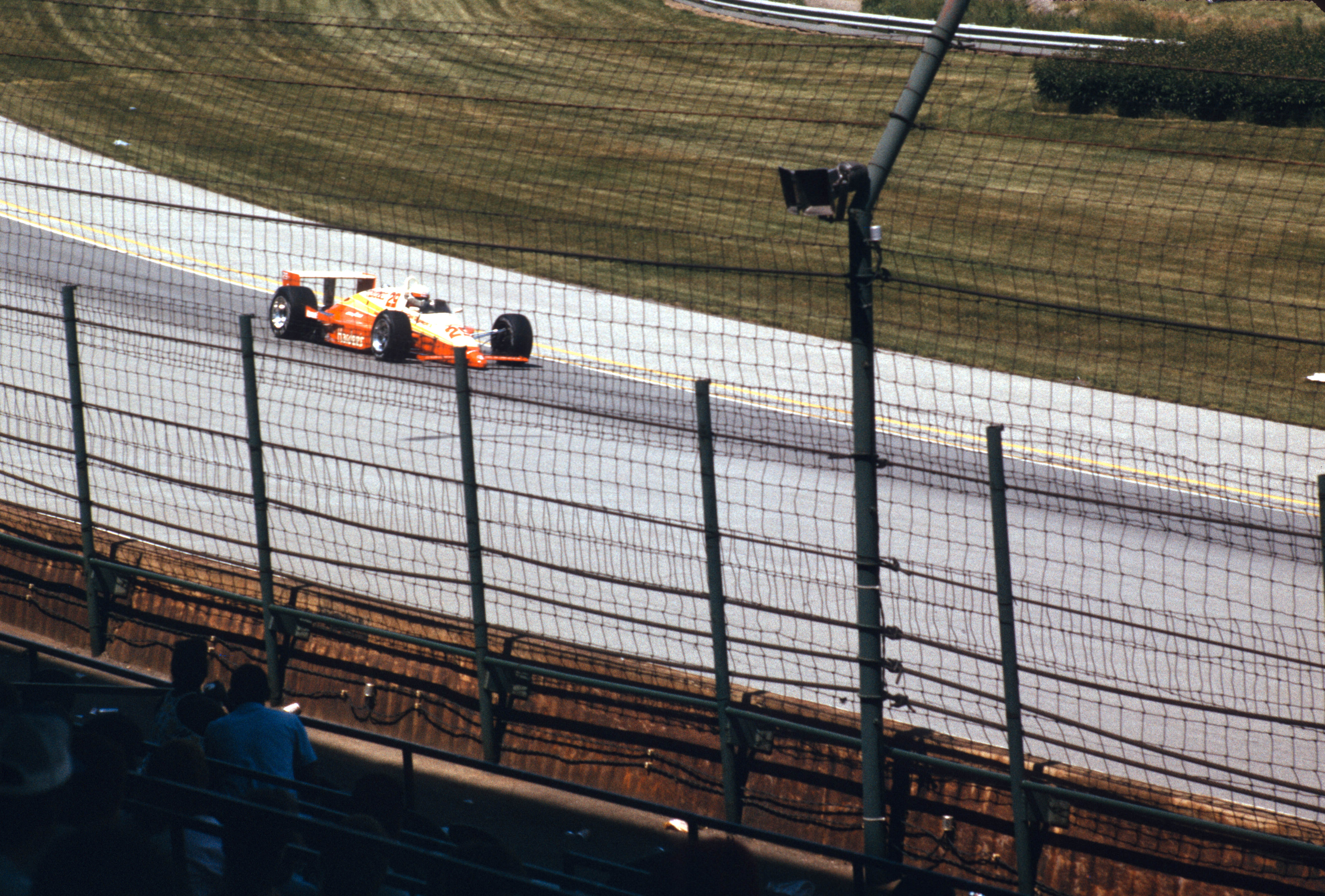
Pancho Carter during his qualification attempt

The final day of qualifying was held on May 17. At the start of the day, three positions in the starting field were vacant. Steve Chassey was the first driver to attempt to qualify, but waved off after only one lap of 195 mph (314 km/h). Chassey's car, a small single-car team, was entered by Lydia Laughrey, a rare female car owner.

Pancho Carter withdrew his qualified car, and re-qualified faster in a backup. Phil Krueger was the third car out on the track, and his first lap would have been fast enough to ultimately make the field. On his second lap, however, he dipped low in turn one, hit the outside wall, then spun and hit the wall again. It was the 24th crash of the month. After the crash, the track stayed mostly quiet until 4:45 p.m.

Steve Chassey made his second attempt to qualify, but again waved off following three, slow, inconsistent laps. Rocky Moran was next, and despite only a 199 mph (320 km/h) average, he completed his run. Dominic Dobson and Davy Jones (driving for Foyt Racing) then filled the field to 33 cars. Jones in the process, became the fastest rookie qualifier in the field.

With 49 minutes to go before the 6 o'clock gun, George Snider took another Foyt back-up car and bumped out Rocky Moran. It was the fourth Foyt entry to qualify for the field. The move put rookie Dominic Dobson (201.240 mph) on the bubble. Dobson survived attempts by Ed Pimm and Rick Miaskiewicz, and at 5:30 p.m., still clung to the starting field.

Steve Chassey made his third and final allotted attempt. At 202.488 mph (325.873 km/h), he bumped his way into the field by just over 1 mph. Dobson was out, and Sammy Swindell (201.840 mph) was now on the bubble. Ed Pimm, after days of frustration, handling problems, and with the oil light flashing during his run, managed to bump Swindell out. That move dropped Chassey down to the bubble spot. Over the final twenty minutes, Chassey held on, and the field was set.

== Carburetion Day ==
On Thursday May 21, the final scheduled practice session was held. The weather continued to be hot and dry. Two incidents during the session altered the grid for race day, bringing the total for the month to 25 crashes leading up to the race.

About a half hour into the session, A. J. Foyt, who qualified 4th on the grid, got into turbulence in turn one. He lost control, did a half spin, and crashed hard into the wall. About an hour later, Emerson Fittipaldi, nursing an ill-handling car, spun and crashed in turn three.

Foyt was uninjured, but was furious with himself after warning his rookie drivers about the challenging conditions, only to crash himself. Foyt's car was deemed repairable, and the crew worked over the next three days to put it back together, using pieces from back-up cars. By race day the car was finished, and he would be able to grid in his qualified position. Fittipaldi's car, however, was a total loss, and he would be required to start a backup car on race day. He was moved from the 10th starting position to the rear of the field (33rd).

=== Pit Stop Contest ===
The semifinals and finals for the 11th annual Miller Pit Stop Contest were held on Thursday May 21. The top three race qualifiers and their respective pit crews were automatically eligible: Mario Andretti, Bobby Rahal, and Rick Mears. However, Mears declined the invitation. A. J. Foyt (who qualified 4th) filled that spot. Roberto Guerrero secured the fourth and final spot in the contest during preliminaries which were on held on Thursday May 14. Guerrero's team (13.945 seconds) advanced ahead of a few others who attempted to qualify.

Mario Andretti and Bobby Rahal easily won their semifinal matches. Rahal's Truesports crew was led by chief mechanic Steve Horne, and was decked out in casual Hawaiian shirts for the occasion. Andretti's crew was led by chief mechanic Colin Duff. Andretti, marching closer to a clean sweep for the month, defeated Rahal in the final round to notch Newman/Haas Racing's first and only victory in the Pit Stop Contest. Rahal beat Andretti off the line, but Rahal's crew had difficulty changing the left front wheel. Andretti's team had a smooth, trouble-free stop, and won easily.

Semifinals
5	Mario Andretti (Newman/Haas Racing)	21.96
4	Roberto Guerrero (Vince Granatelli Racing)	24.94
1	Bobby Rahal (Truesports)	21.34
14	A. J. Foyt (A. J. Foyt Enterprises)	23.24

Finals
5	Mario Andretti (Newman/Haas Racing)	18.05
1	Bobby Rahal (Truesports)	23.27

== Starting grid ==
Row	Inside		Middle		Outside	
1	5	(United States) Mario Andretti; Hanna Auto Wash/Rain-X; Newman/Haas Racing; Lola T8700, Chevrolet 265; 215.39 mph (346.64 km/h)	1	(United States) Bobby Rahal; Budweiser/Red Roof Inns; Truesports; Lola T8700, Cosworth DFX; 213.316 mph (343.299 km/h)	8	(United States) Rick Mears; Pennzoil Z-7; Penske Racing; March 86C, Chevrolet 265; 211.467 mph (340.323 km/h)
2	14	(United States) A.J. Foyt; Copenhagen/Gilmore; A. J. Foyt Enterprises; Lola T8700, Cosworth DFX; 210.935 mph (339.467 km/h)	4	(Colombia) Roberto Guerrero; True Value/STP; Granatelli Racing; March 87C, Cosworth DFX; 210.68 mph (339.06 km/h)	22	(United States) Dick Simon; Soundesign; Dick Simon Racing; Lola T8700, Cosworth DFX; 209.96 mph (337.90 km/h)
3	71	(Netherlands) Arie Luyendyk; Living Well/Provimi Veal/WTTV; Hemelgarn Racing; March 87C, Cosworth DFX; 208.337 mph (335.286 km/h)	21	(United States) Johnny Rutherford; Vermont American; Alex Morales Racing; March 87C, Cosworth DFX; 208.296 mph (335.220 km/h)	18	(United States) Michael Andretti; Kraco/STP; Kraco Racing; March 87C, Cosworth DFX; 206.129 mph (331.732 km/h)
4	23	(Canada) Ludwig Heimrath Jr. Mackenzie Financial/Tim Hortons; Dick Simon Racing; Lola T8700, Cosworth DFX; 207.591 mph (334.085 km/h)	81	(United States) Rich Vogler; Byrd's Kentucky Fried Chicken/Living Well; Hemelgarn Racing; March 87C, Buick V-6; 205.887 mph (331.343 km/h)	11	(United States) Jeff MacPherson; McHoward Leasing; Galles Racing; March 87C, Judd; 205.688 mph (331.023 km/h)
5	91	(United States) Scott Brayton; Amway/Autostyle; Hemelgarn Racing; March 87C, Cosworth DFX; 205.647 mph (330.957 km/h)	15	(Australia) Geoff Brabham; Team Valvoline; Galles Racing; March 87C, Judd; 205.503 mph (330.725 km/h)	56	(United States) Gary Bettenhausen; Genesee Beer Wagon; Gohr Racing; March 86C, Cosworth DFX; 204.504 mph (329.117 km/h)
6	3	(United States) Danny Sullivan; Miller American; Penske Racing; March 86C, Chevrolet 265; 210.271 mph (338.398 km/h)	12	(Italy) Fabrizio Barbazza; Arciero Winery; Arciero Racing; March 87C, Cosworth DFX; 208.038 mph (334.805 km/h)	2	(United States) Gordon Johncock; STP Oil Treatment; American Racing; March 86C, Buick V-6; 207.99 mph (334.73 km/h)
7	77	(Republic of Ireland) Derek Daly; Scheid Tire/Superior Training/Metrolink; Pace Racing; March 87C, Buick V-6; 207.522 mph (333.974 km/h)	25	(United States) Al Unser; Cummins/Holset Turbo; Penske Racing; March 86C, Cosworth DFX; 207.423 mph (333.815 km/h)	33	(United States) Tom Sneva; Skoal Bandit; Mike Curb; March 86C, Buick V-6; 207.254 mph (333.543 km/h)
8	30	(United States) Al Unser Jr. Domino's Pizza 'Hot One'; Doug Shierson Racing; March 87C, Cosworth DFX; 206.752 mph (332.735 km/h)	24	(United States) Randy Lewis; Toshiba/Altos/Oracle; Leader Cards Racing; March 87C, Cosworth DFX; 206.209 mph (331.861 km/h)	7	(United States) Kevin Cogan; Marlboro; Patrick Racing; March 87C, Chevrolet 265; 205.999 mph (331.523 km/h)
9	55	(Mexico) Josele Garza; Bryant Heating & Cooling/Schaefer Beer; Machinists Union Racing; March 87C, Cosworth DFX; 205.692 mph (331.029 km/h)	41	(United States) Stan Fox; Kerker Exhaust/Skoal Classic; A. J. Foyt Enterprises; March 86C, Cosworth DFX; 204.518 mph (329.140 km/h)	16	(United States) Tony Bettenhausen Jr. Nationwise/Payless; Bettenhausen Motorsports; March 86C, Cosworth DFX; 203.892 mph (328.132 km/h)
10	44	(United States) Davy Jones; Skoal Classic/Gilmore/UNO; A. J. Foyt Enterprises; March 86C, Cosworth DFX; 208.117 mph (334.932 km/h)	29	(United States) Pancho Carter; Hardee's; Machinists Union Racing; March 87C, Cosworth DFX; 205.154 mph (330.163 km/h)	98	(United States) Ed Pimm; Skoal Classic; Mike Curb; March 86C, Cosworth DFX; 203.284 mph (327.154 km/h)
11	84	(United States) George Snider; Calumet/Copenhagen; A. J. Foyt Enterprises; March 86C, Chevy V-6; 203.192 mph (327.006 km/h)	87	(United States) Steve Chassey; United Oil/Life of Indiana; United Oil; March 87C, Cosworth DFX; 202.488 mph (325.873 km/h)	20	(Brazil) Emerson Fittipaldi†; Marlboro; Patrick Racing; March 87C, Chevrolet 265; 205.584 mph (330.855 km/h)

- † - Emerson Fittipaldi qualified 10th on pole day. On Carburetion Day, he crashed his already-qualified car, and it was damaged beyond repair. The car was replaced with a back-up car, and was moved the rear of the field.

=== Alternates ===
- First alternate: Sammy Swindell R (#59) – bumped
- Second alternate: Dominic Dobson R (#17) – bumped

=== Failed to qualify ===
- Rocky Moran (#76) – bumped
- Rick Miaskiewicz R (#97) – too slow
- Jim Crawford (#2T) – wrecked qualifying on pole day; suffered serious injuries to feet and legs, replaced by Gordon Johncock
- Phil Krueger (#10T) – wrecked qualifying on bump day
- Danny Ongais (#25) – wrecked in practice; suffered concussion and replaced by Al Unser
- Dick Ferguson (#19) - wrecked in practice; car was rebuilt by bump day but never turned a lap at speed
- Dennis Firestone (#10) - wrecked in practice, injured
- Spike Gehlhausen (#35) - did not attempt to qualify
- Johnny Parsons (#91) - wrecked in practice, broken leg

== Race summary ==
=== Start ===
Race day dawned warm with clear blue skies. During the pace lap, the car of George Snider caught fire, with a turbocharger failure. Snider pulled into the pits, as the rest of the field took the green flag. Mario Andretti charged from the pole position, and led the field into turn one.

In the first turn of the first lap, Josele Garza was down low on the white line, and lost the back end of the car. Right next to Al Unser, he started spinning. Unser slipped by cleanly, but reported being tagged gently from behind. Garza spun up the track, and collected Pancho Carter. Neither driver was injured, but both cars suffered damage.

=== First half ===
On lap 6, the green came back out, with Mario Andretti continuing to lead. Driving at a blistering pace, it took only seven laps for him to start lapping backmarkers. On lap 25, Ludwig Heimrath was running 7th, and made his first pit stop, but one of the wheels was not properly secured. The wheel came off, and he spun in turn four. Under the caution, Mario Andretti pitted, and managed to stay in the lead. Only seven cars remained on the lead lap.

Around the 100-mile (160 km) mark, several cars were dropping out of contention. Kevin Cogan blew an engine, Randy Lewis dropped out with a gearbox failure, and Michael Andretti broke a CV joint, then had a pit fire. On lap 34, Bobby Rahal, who had been running as high as second, made an unscheduled, five-minute long pit stop due to an electrical problem. After several long stops, Rahal would eventually drop out.

Mario Andretti continued to dominate, giving up the lead temporarily only through the sequence of pit stops. Roberto Guerrero and Danny Sullivan consistently were chasing him. Shortly before the halfway point, Rick Mears was forced to the pits with an electrical problem, and would also be forced to drop out.

At the 90 lap mark, Al Unser Sr. had worked up to 4th, and Tom Sneva 5th. Unser had been lapped by Andretti early in the going. At that juncture, he elected to change his strategy and started charging up the standings. Andretti was still dominating, running laps in the low 200 mph range, while most other cars were in the 190 mph range, or slower. Dick Simon was running 7th, but ran the car out of fuel on the backstretch. He lost several laps as he was towed back to the pits, but received fuel, and returned to the track.

=== Second half ===
The dominance by Mario Andretti continued in the second half, leading Roberto Guerrero by several seconds. The rest of the field was at least one lap down. Several of the other competitors were falling by the wayside, including A. J. Foyt (who was running 9th) and Rich Vogler. Sullivan and Unser Sr., both in the top 5, were now close to 2 laps down. Meanwhile, Tom Sneva and Arie Luyendyk, clinging to the top ten, both started losing ground to Fabrizio Barbazza.

==== Spectator fatality ====
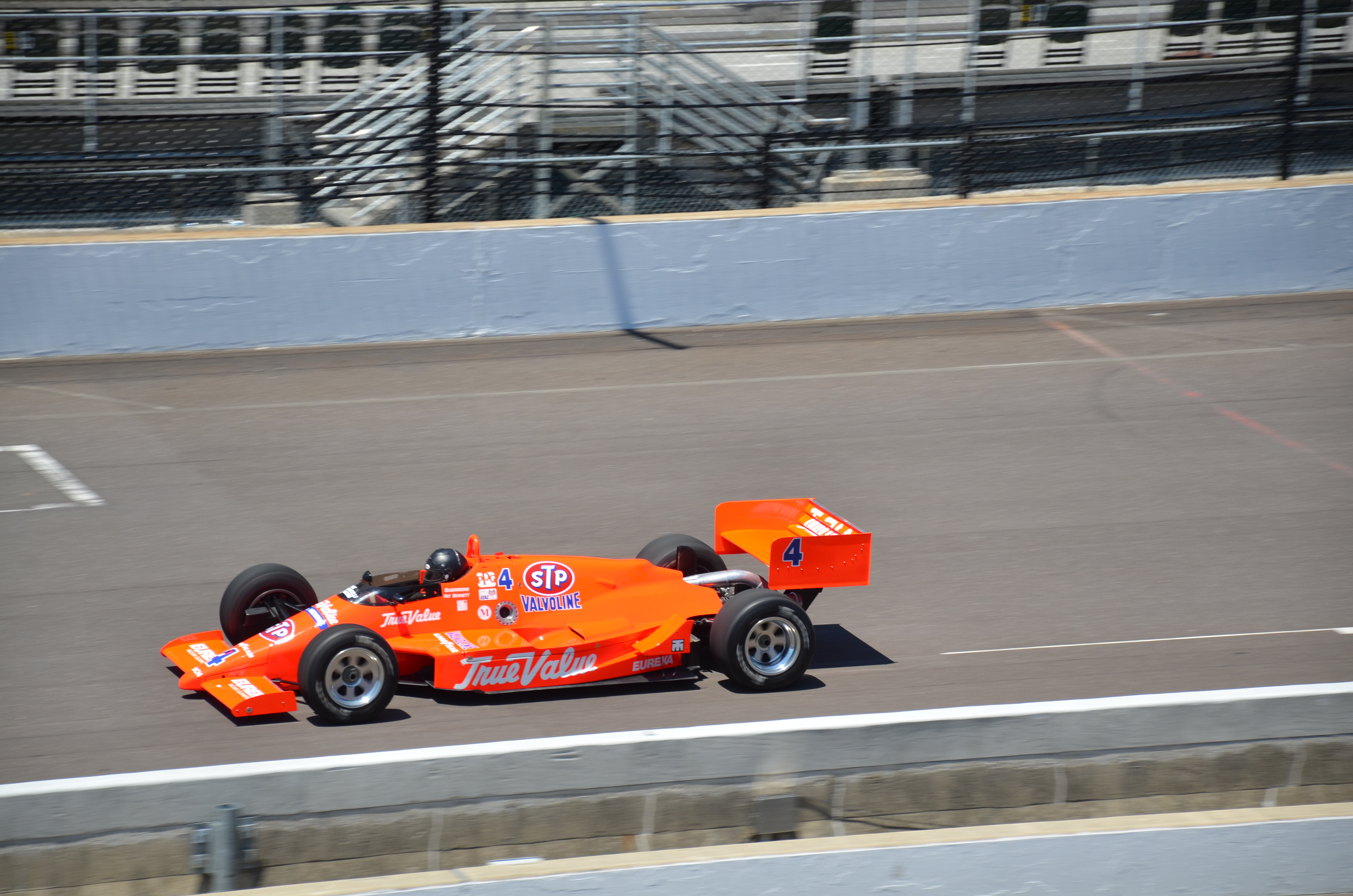
A replica of Roberto Guerrero's 1987 March/Cosworth (shown in road course trim)

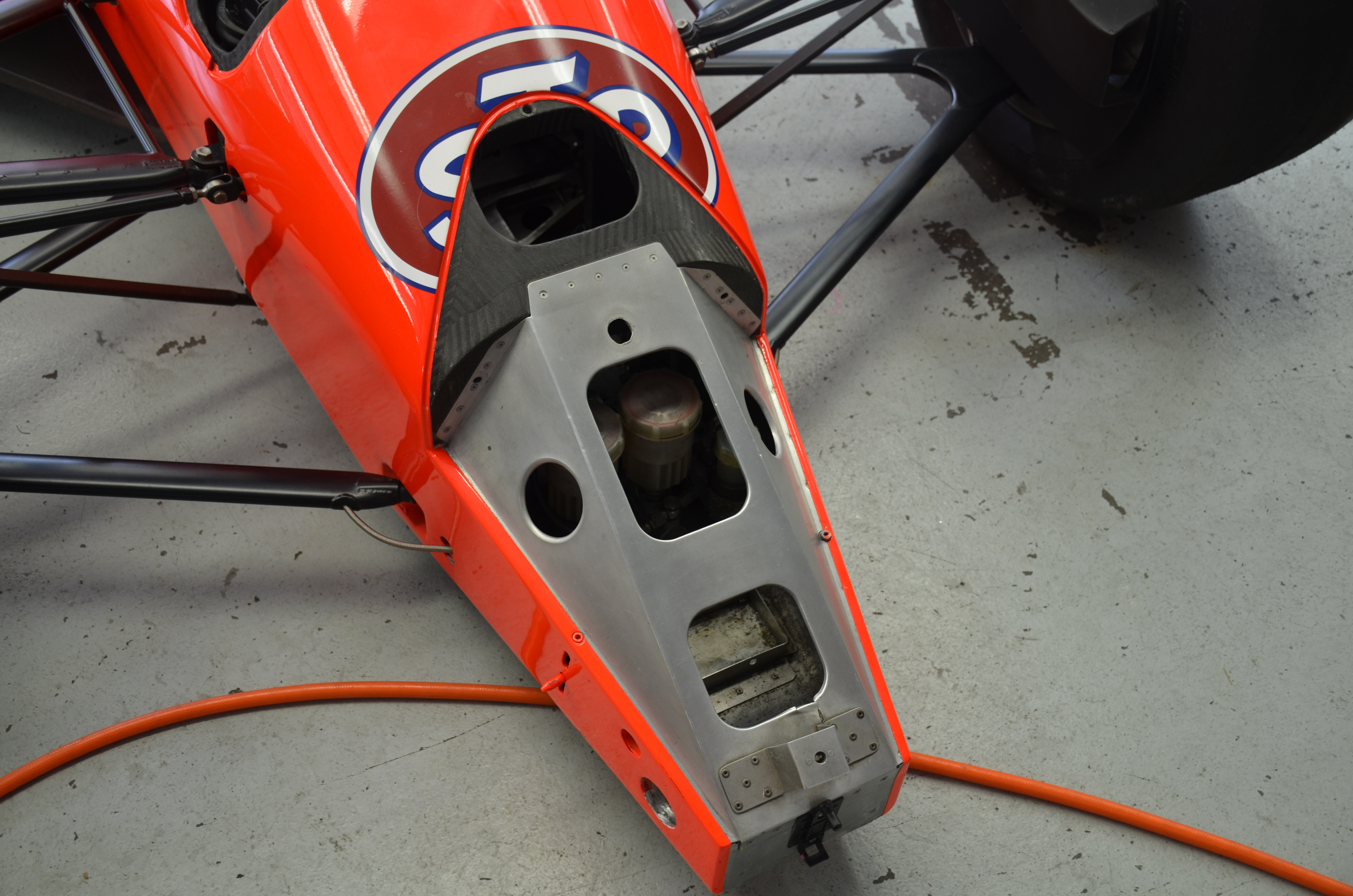
A close-up look of the 1987 March chassis nose cone area with the cover removed. Note the location of the brake master cylinder and clutch slave cylinder nestled inside. This part of the car was damaged when Guerrero struck the errant wheel.

On the 130th lap, Tony Bettenhausen started suffering a handling problem exiting turn two. Down the backstretch, his right-front wheel lug nut may have come off the car, and the wheel began to loosen. In turn three, the wheel came off and began rolling though the north short chute. Second place Roberto Guerrero came up on the wheel suddenly, and hit it with his nosecone. The nosecone cover was broken off, and the wheel was punted high into the air. The wheel cleared the catchfencing, and flew towards the "K" grandstand. Spectators were witnessed fleeing the seating in a "V" shape as the 18-pound wheel headed their direction. The wheel came down and struck 41-year-old Lyle Kurtenbach of Rothschild, Wisconsin in the head, sitting in the top row of the grandstand. He suffered massive head injuries, and was pronounced dead at Methodist Hospital shortly afterwards. The wheel bounded and came to rest in the tunnel underneath the north short chute.

Guerrero slowed, and nursed his car back to the pits. Under the caution flag, the pit crew worked to replace the nosecone, and got Guerrero back on to the track, albeit a lap down. It was not immediately discovered at the time, but striking the tire had damaged the clutch slave cylinder, which was located in the nose. Fluid had begun to leak from the cylinder, which would ultimately render the clutch inoperable. At speed, use of the clutch was largely unnecessary, as most drivers were practiced in shifting without the clutch. But exiting the pits from a standing start would pose increasing difficulty.

The incident was reported live on the Indianapolis Motor Speedway Radio Network by fourth turn reporter Bob Jenkins. The extent of injury was unknown at the time. The live ABC television broadcast, however, was at commercial when it occurred. During the commercial, the incident was noticed by the producers and commentators. When they returned on-air, however, footage of the incident was not shown, nor were specific details given of what had occurred. Instead, still images of Guerrero's nosecone and pit crew were shown. No further information was given during the remainder of the race. During the post-race coverage, Jim McKay briefly announced on-air that the Associated Press wire service was reporting that a spectator fatality had occurred, but he did not connect the incidents.

==== Late race ====
With 25 laps to go, Mario Andretti held a one-lap lead over second place Roberto Guerrero, and an almost two-lap lead over third place Al Unser Sr. The field had dwindled down to only 12 cars running, most of which were many laps down. With Rick Mears and Danny Sullivan both out of the race, Roger Penske took over the pit of Al Unser Sr. Sullivan, Mears as well as other team members, gathered at Unser's pit stall to watch the race finish and pull for their teammate.

Andretti, Guerrero, and Unser all needed one final fuel stop to make it to the finish. Unser Sr. made his final pit stop first. Roger Penske called Unser into the pits a few laps early, in an effort to "put the pressure on Guerrero" in hopes of at least moving up to second place.

On lap 176, Andretti was leading Guerrero by just over one lap. He began to slow coming out of turn 4, which allowed Guerrero to pass him (and un-lap himself). At first it was believed that Andretti was ducking into the pits for his final pit stop. However, Andretti suddenly slowed down the frontstretch as he started lap 177. An electrical failure in the fuel metering device, part of the fuel injection system, began flooding the engine with raw fuel. After the race, it was determined that Andretti had begun to back off to protect his lead. His lower revs developed a harmonic imbalance in the engine, which broke a valve spring. Andretti had led 170 of first 177 laps.

The misfortune reinforced the perceived Andretti Curse. Andretti coasted around to the pit area, and the team immediately replaced the spark box and wastegate. Guerrero stormed into the lead, but still had one pit stop remaining. Sitting still in the pit area, the once dominating Andretti started slipping in the standings.

=== Finish ===
With twenty laps to go, Roberto Guerrero led second place Unser Sr. by almost a full lap. He came upon Unser Sr. in traffic, and decisively put him a lap down on lap 180. Two laps later, Guerrero went to the pits for his final fuel stop. With his clutch failing from the earlier incident, entering and exiting the pits was becoming increasingly difficult. Sometime during the race, Guerrero had also broken third gear. While stopped in the pit box, his car became stuck in gear. When refueling was complete, he attempted to pull out of the pits, but the engine stalled. Unser Sr. was driving through the turn three at the time. The crew refired the engine, and the car started to roll away. With Unser Sr. heading down the mainstretch, Guerrero's car stalled once again. The lifeless car sat on the pit road as Unser Sr. drove by to take the lead.

Guerrero's frenzied crew ran out to the car and pulled it back to the pit. At that point, they simply tried to push start the car, which was successful. Guerrero finally got back on to the track, but by that time, Unser Sr. had put him a full lap down. Meanwhile, Mario Andretti's team had made some hasty repairs, and returned him to the track. After one slow lap, still being scored in the top 8, he returned to the pits for further repairs.

Guerrero spent the next several laps furiously chasing Unser Sr. in an attempt to get his lap back. With 11 laps to go, Unser was slowing his pace as the third place car, rookie Fabrizio Barbazza was momentarily holding him back. Barbazza was trying to avoid going two laps down. Unser's crew asked officials to wave the "blue flag" to order Barbazza to pull over and allow Unser past. Officials waved the blue flag to Barbazza who refused to acknowledge. The issue became moot when Barbazza ducked into the pits for a late pit stop. With 9 laps to go, Guerrero unlapped himself. Meanwhile, Mario Andretti tried once again to get his car back up to speed.

Mario Andretti's second return to the track was also short-lived, and his car stalled. The car coasted to a stop in turn four and brought out the race's final caution on lap 192. The yellow flag bunched up the field, and allowed Guerrero to make up the rest of the lap; he lined up only six cars behind Unser Sr. The green flag came out with four laps to go, and Al Unser Sr. held off Roberto Guerrero by 4.496 seconds, to win his record-tying fourth Indianapolis 500 victory. By leading the final 18 laps, Unser Sr. tied the all-time record for most laps led in Indy 500 competition, and, at 47 years of age, also became the oldest winner of the 500.

=== Post-race notes ===
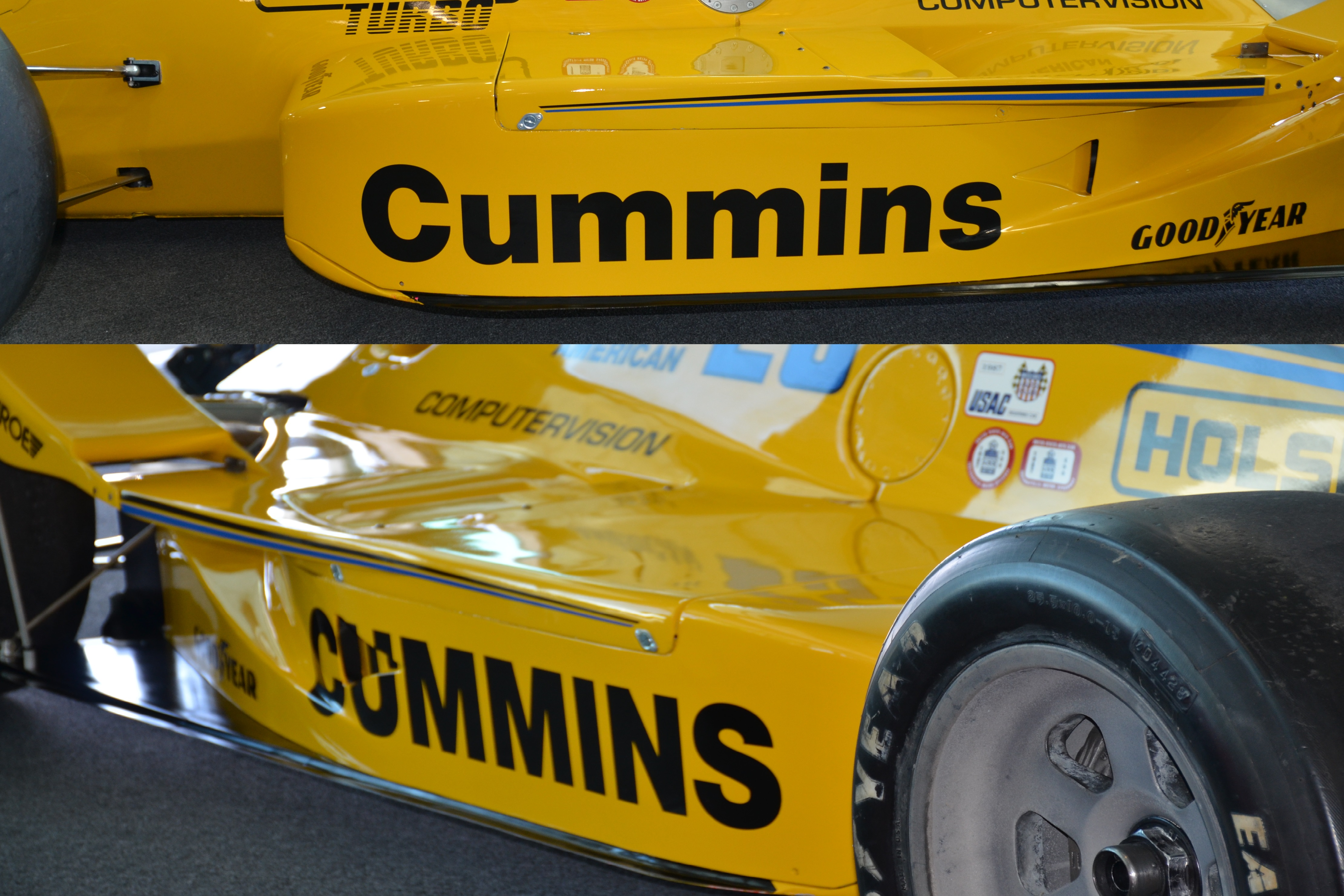
A replica of Al Unser Sr.'s winning car with "Cummins" decals accurately depicted in original race day configuration; mixed case on the left sidepod (top), and all-caps on the right sidepod (bottom)

Mario Andretti's dominance of the month, and subsequent failure to achieve victory, was largely unprecedented in modern times. He led the practice speed chart on 11 of the 17 days (he participated in only 13 days), won the pole position, won the pit stop contest, had the fastest leading lap of the race, and led 170 of the first 177 laps. Despite not running at the finish, due to high attrition, Andretti was still credited with 9th place, his 8th top-10 finish at Indy.

Al Unser Sr.'s victory in a year-old car was unusual in the CART era. Just weeks prior to being used in the race, the car had been sitting on display at a Sheraton hotel in Reading, Pennsylvania. The car went from Hertz sponsorship to Cummins after a couple of days. Due to time constraints, proper decals were unavailable in time for qualifying. Unser Sr.'s car was fitted with sentence case "Cummins" decals (the proper form of the company's logo) on the left sidepod - the side most visible, and the side used for most official photographs. All upper case "CUMMINS" decals (an improper rendition of the company's logo) were used on the right sidepod (the side least visible, and seldom photographed).

In post-race interviews, brothers Bobby Unser and Al Unser had a live conversation from the television broadcasting booth to victory circle, with Bobby congratulating his brother Al. It is believed to be the only time brothers were part of the victory lane interview. Bobby was seen in tears of joy as he watched his family celebrate in victory lane, from the broadcast booth. Bobby was in his first race broadcasting the Indy 500 on ABC television (the previous year he was part of the radio network crew). According to Unser, he told the booth about the chances of his brother winning the race being good when coming down to Guerrero possibly making a mistake. Two nights before the race, at the Hulman Hundred, Al Unser Sr.'s nephew Robby Unser suffered a broken leg in a crash. Robby listened to the race on the radio at the hospital, while Robby's father Bobby Unser called the race live on ABC Sports.

This was the final Indy 500 for famous spectator Larry Bisceglia of Yuma. He traditionally was the first person in line since 1950, as well as 1948–1949 when he was one of the first in line. Bisceglia died on December 7, 1988.

A little more than two months after the race, the Indianapolis Motor Speedway hosted the opening ceremonies for the Pan Am Games.

== Box score ==
Finish	Start	No	Name	Team	Chassis	Engine	Laps	Status	Points
1	20	25	(United States) Al Unser W	Penske Racing	March 86C	Cosworth DFX	200	162.175 mph	20
2	5	4	(Colombia) Roberto Guerrero	Vince Granatelli Racing	March 87C	Cosworth DFX	200	+4.496 seconds	16
3	17	12	(Italy) Fabrizio Barbazza R	Arciero Racing	March 87C	Cosworth DFX	198	-2 Laps	14
4	22	30	(United States) Al Unser Jr.	Doug Shierson Racing	March 87C	Cosworth DFX	196	-4 Laps	12
5	15	56	(United States) Gary Bettenhausen	Gohr Racing	March 86C	Cosworth DFX	195	-5 Laps	10
6	6	22	(United States) Dick Simon	Dick Simon Racing	Lola T87/00	Cosworth DFX	193	-7 Laps	8
7	26	41	(United States) Stan Fox R	A. J. Foyt Enterprises	March 86C	Cosworth DFX	192	-8 Laps	6
8	12	11	(United States) Jeff MacPherson R	Galles Racing	March 87C	Brabham-Honda	182	-18 Laps	5
9	1	5	(United States) Mario Andretti W	Newman/Haas Racing	Lola T87/00	Ilmor-Chevrolet	180	Valve spring	6 (2)
10	27	16	(United States) Tony Bettenhausen Jr.	Bettenhausen Motorsports	March 86C	Cosworth DFX	171	Engine	3
11	8	21	(United States) Johnny Rutherford W	Alex Morales Motorsports	March 87C	Cosworth DFX	171	-29 Laps	2
12	13	91	(United States) Scott Brayton	Hemelgarn Racing	March 87C	Cosworth DFX	167	Engine	1
13	16	3	(United States) Danny Sullivan W	Penske Racing	March 86C	Ilmor-Chevrolet	160	Engine	0
14	21	33	(United States) Tom Sneva W	Mike Curb Racing	March 86C	Buick V-6	143	Crash T2	0
15	19	77	(Republic of Ireland) Derek Daly	BC Pace Racing	March 87C	Buick V-6	133	Engine	0
16	33	20	(Brazil) Emerson Fittipaldi	Patrick Racing	March 87C	Ilmor-Chevrolet	131	Lost Power	0
17	25	55	(Mexico) Josele Garza	Machinists Union Racing	March 87C	Cosworth DFX	129	Flagged	0
18	7	71	(Netherlands) Arie Luyendyk	Hemelgarn Racing	March 87C	Cosworth DFX	125	Suspension	0
19	4	14	(United States) A. J. Foyt W	A. J. Foyt Enterprises	Lola T87/00	Cosworth DFX	117	Oil Seal	0
20	11	81	(United States) Rich Vogler	Hemelgarn Racing	March 87C	Buick V-6	109	Rocker Arm	0
21	30	98	(United States) Ed Pimm	Mike Curb Racing	March 86C	Cosworth DFX	109	Lost Boost	0
22	18	2	(United States) Gordon Johncock W	American Racing Series	March 86C	Buick V-6	76	Valve	0
23	3	8	(United States) Rick Mears W	Penske Racing	March 86C	Ilmor-Chevrolet	75	Coil Wire	0
24	14	15	(Australia) Geoff Brabham	Galles Racing	March 87C	Brabham-Honda	71	Oil Pressure	0
25	32	87	(United States) Steve Chassey	Lydia Laughrey	March 87C	Cosworth DFX	68	Engine	0
26	2	1	(United States) Bobby Rahal W	Truesports	Lola T87/00	Cosworth DFX	57	Ignition	0
27	29	29	(United States) Pancho Carter	Machinists Union Racing	March 87C	Cosworth DFX	45	Valve	0
28	28	44	(United States) Davy Jones R	A. J. Foyt Enterprises	March 86C	Cosworth DFX	34	Engine	0
29	9	18	(United States) Michael Andretti	Kraco Racing	March 87C	Cosworth DFX	28	CV Joint	0
30	10	23	(Canada) Ludwig Heimrath R	Dick Simon Racing	Lola T87/00	Cosworth DFX	25	Spin	0
31	24	7	(United States) Kevin Cogan	Patrick Racing	March 87C	Ilmor-Chevrolet	21	Oil Pump	0
32	23	24	(United States) Randy Lewis R	Leader Card Racers	March 87C	Cosworth DFX	8	Gearbox	0
33	31	84	(United States) George Snider	A. J. Foyt Enterprises	March 86C	Chevy V-6	0	Fuel Leak	0

W Former Indianapolis 500 winner

R Indianapolis 500 Rookie

All cars utilized Goodyear tires.

=== Race statistics ===
Lap leaders
Laps	Leader
1–27	Mario Andretti
28	Roberto Guerrero
29–60	Mario Andretti
61–64	Danny Sullivan
65–80	Mario Andretti
81	Roberto Guerrero
82–96	Mario Andretti
97	Roberto Guerrero
98–177	Mario Andretti
178–182	Roberto Guerrero
183–200	Al Unser Sr.

Total laps led
Driver	Laps
Mario Andretti	170
Al Unser Sr.	18
Roberto Guerrero	8
Danny Sullivan	4

Cautions: 10 for 54 laps
Laps	Reason
1–5	Josele Garza, Pancho Carter crash in turn 1
27–33	Ludwig Heimrath spun/lost wheel in turn 4
39–42	Debris
62–67	Debris
81–84	Danny Sullivan spun in turn 4
96–101	Dick Simon stalled on backstretch
131–134	Tony Bettenhausen lost wheel in turn 3
150–158	Tom Sneva crash in turn 3
162–166	Fabrizio Barbazza spun in turn 3
192–196	Mario Andretti stalled in turn 4

== Broadcasting ==
=== Radio ===
The race was carried live on the IMS Radio Network. This would be the final 500 that featured the familiar crew that worked the race from the mid-1970s to the late-1980s. Paul Page served as the chief announcer for the eleventh and final year until 2014 when he took over for Mike King who unexpectedly resigned at the end of 2013. He would remain through the end of 2015 until a suitable replacement was found (Mark Jaynes). It was Page's fourteenth year overall as part of the network crew. Lou Palmer, who debuted in 1958, had become a fixture of the south pits and victory lane since 1963. The 1987 race was the final time Palmer reported from the pit area, and the final time he conducted the victory lane winner's interview.

Parnelli Jones joined the crew as the "driver expert." After only one year on the radio crew, Bobby Unser left to become a driver analyst for the ABC television crew. Luke Walton reprised his traditional duty of introducing the starting command during the pre-race; however, he did not have an active role during the race. With four pit reporters now part of the crew, Bob Forbes went back to exclusive duty covering the garage area and track hospital.

Later in the year, Paul Page left NBC Sports and joined ABC in September. As a result, Page left the IMS Radio Network, and ultimately would be replaced as "Voice of the 500" by Lou Palmer for 1988.

Indianapolis Motor Speedway Radio Network
Booth announcers	Turn reporters	Pit/garage reporters
Chief Announcer: Paul Page; Driver expert: Parnelli Jones; Statistician: John DeCamp; Historian: Donald Davidson	Turn 1: Jerry Baker; Turn 2: Howdy Bell; Turn 3: Larry Henry; Turn 4: Bob Jenkins	Luke Walton (pre-race); Sally Larvick (interviews); Bob Forbes (garages)
Chief Announcer: Paul Page; Driver expert: Parnelli Jones; Statistician: John DeCamp; Historian: Donald Davidson	Turn 1: Jerry Baker; Turn 2: Howdy Bell; Turn 3: Larry Henry; Turn 4: Bob Jenkins	Ron Carrell (north pits); Chuck Marlowe (north-central pits); Gary Gerould (south-central pits); Lou Palmer (south pits)

=== Television ===
ABC Sports carried live flag-to-flag coverage in the United States for the first time on the scheduled race day. Jim McKay served as host, his 20th and final "500" on ABC. Jim Lampley served as announcer for the second and final time. Bobby Unser joined ABC starting in 1987, serving as color commentator alongside Sam Posey. Unser had been working CART series races on NBC (with anchor Paul Page) and had been part of the IMS Radio Network crew in 1986.

Three pit reporters served on the crew: Jack Arute, Al Trautwig, and Jerry Gappens (the future CEO of New Hampshire Motor Speedway). The 1987 race was Gappens' lone appearance at Indy, and Trautwig's assignments primarily focused on features and interviews. The victory lane interview of race winner Al Unser Sr., conducted by Arute, featured a unique moment when Bobby Unser took over and conducted a brief interview with his brother.

The broadcast has re-aired numerous times on ESPN Classic since the mid-2000s.

ABC Television
Booth announcers	Pit/garage reporters
Host: Jim McKay; Announcer: Jim Lampley; Color: Sam Posey; Color: Bobby Unser	Jack Arute; Jerry Gappens; Al Trautwig

== CART standings following the race ==
Note: Only the top 10 are listed.

Rank	Driver	Points	Diff	Pos change
1	Mario Andretti	39	Leader	0
2	Roberto Guerrero	38	-1	+1
3	Al Unser Jr.	28	-11	+2
4	Michael Andretti	24	-15	-2
5	Al Unser	20	-19	Unranked
6	Josele Garza	18	-21	-2
7	Bobby Rahal	16	-23	-2
8	Fabrizio Barbazza	15	-24	+12
9	Tom Sneva	14	-25	-2
9	Arie Luyendyk	14	-25	-2

== 1986–87 USAC Gold Crown Championship ==
1986–87 USAC Championship Car season
- USAC Gold Crown Championship

Season
- Races: 1

Awards
- National champion: (United States) Al Unser Sr.

The 1986–87 USAC Gold Crown Championship season consisted of one sanctioned race. The schedule was based on a split-calendar, beginning in June 1986 and running through May 1987. Starting in 1981, USAC scaled back their participation in top-level Indy car racing, and ultimately ceased sanctioning races outside of the Indianapolis 500 following their 1983–84 season. Subsequently, the Gold Crown Championship would consist of only one event annually; the winner of the Indianapolis 500 would be the de facto Gold Crown champion, as it was their lone points-paying event. The preeminent national championship season was instead sanctioned by CART, and the Indy 500 paid championship points separately (on a different scale) toward the CART championship as well.

Al Unser Sr., by virtue of winning the 1987 Indianapolis 500, also won the 1986–87 USAC Championship.

=== Final points standings (top five) ===
Pos	Driver	INDY (United States)	Pts
1	(United States) Al Unser Sr.	1	1000
2	(Colombia) Roberto Guerrero	2	800
3	(Italy) Fabrizio Barbazza	3	700
4	(United States) Al Unser Jr.	4	600
5	(United States) Gary Bettenhausen	5	500

== Selected rules and specifications ==
Engine regulations
Engine Type	Maximum Displacement	Turbocharger Boost
Turbocharged DOHC V-8	161.7 cu in (2.65 L)	47 inHg (1,600 mbar)
Turbocharged Stock Block V-6	209.3 cu in (3.43 L)	57 inHg (1,900 mbar)
Normally aspriated OHC	274.6 cu in (4.50 L)	—
Normally aspriated Stock Block	355.1 cu in (5.82 L)	—
Fuel	On-board capacity	Total allotment
Methanol	40 US gal (151.4 L)	280 US gal (1,100 L)

Rookie Test
Phase	Laps	Speed bracket
1	10	180–185 mph
2	10	185–190 mph
3*	10	190–195 mph
4*	10	195–200 mph

*Veteran Refresher tests consisted of Phases 3–4 of the rookie test.

== Notes ==
=== Works cited ===
- 1987 Indianapolis 500 Day-By-Day Trackside Report For the Media
- Indianapolis 500 History: Race & All-Time Stats – official site
- 1987 Indianapolis 500 radio broadcast, Indianapolis Motor Speedway Radio Network

1986 Indianapolis 500; Bobby Rahal	1987 Indianapolis 500; Al Unser	1988 Indianapolis 500; Rick Mears
