= March 87C =

Race car by March Engineering

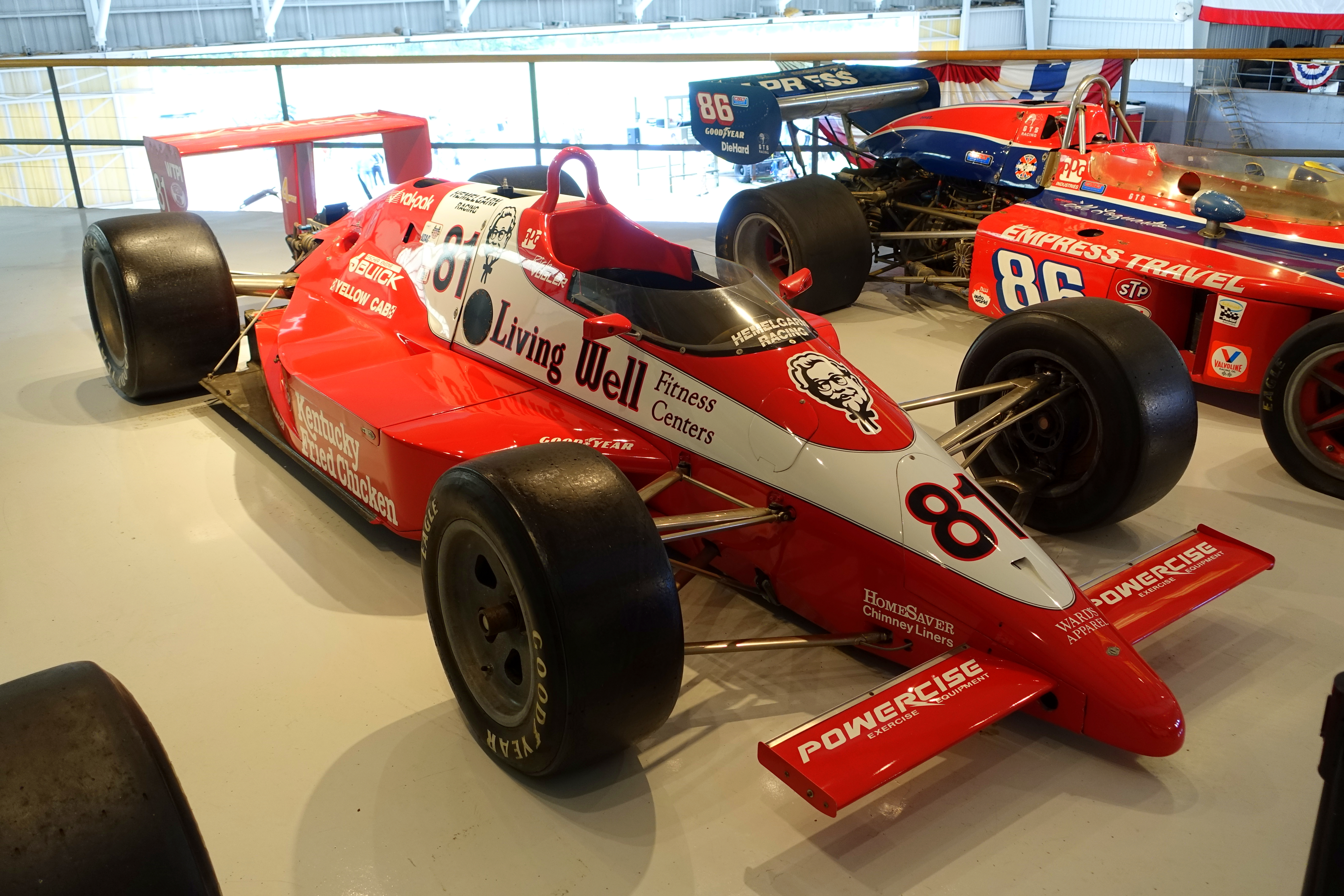
1987 March 87C

The March 87C is open-wheel race car, designed and built by March Engineering, to compete in the 1987 CART PPG Indy Car World Series, alongside the 85C and 86C. The results for the 87C were formidable, but slightly less-successful than the results achieved by the 86C a season earlier. The 87C won eight races and six poles and placed second, third, and fourth in the final points standings. It was powered by the Cosworth DFX turbo engine., as well as the Ilmor-Chevrolet, the Brabham-Honda (Judd), and the Buick.

The previous year's 86C chassis still saw use by some teams in 1987, and notably won two races: the 1987 Indianapolis 500 and the Pocono 500. At the 1987 Indy 500, several teams racing the 87C struggled during practice and qualifying with handling issues. However on race day, Roberto Guerrero, Fabrizio Barbazza, and Al Unser Jr. finished 2nd, 3rd, and 4th, respectively.

March, which had won the CART season championship in both 1985 and 1986, failed to win their third championship in a row with the 87C. Bobby Rahal (Truesports), the 1986 champion, switched to the Lola for 1987, and won the CART title. Michael Andretti, who won four races - including the Michigan 500 - was runner-up in the points championship driving an 87C.
