= March 86C =

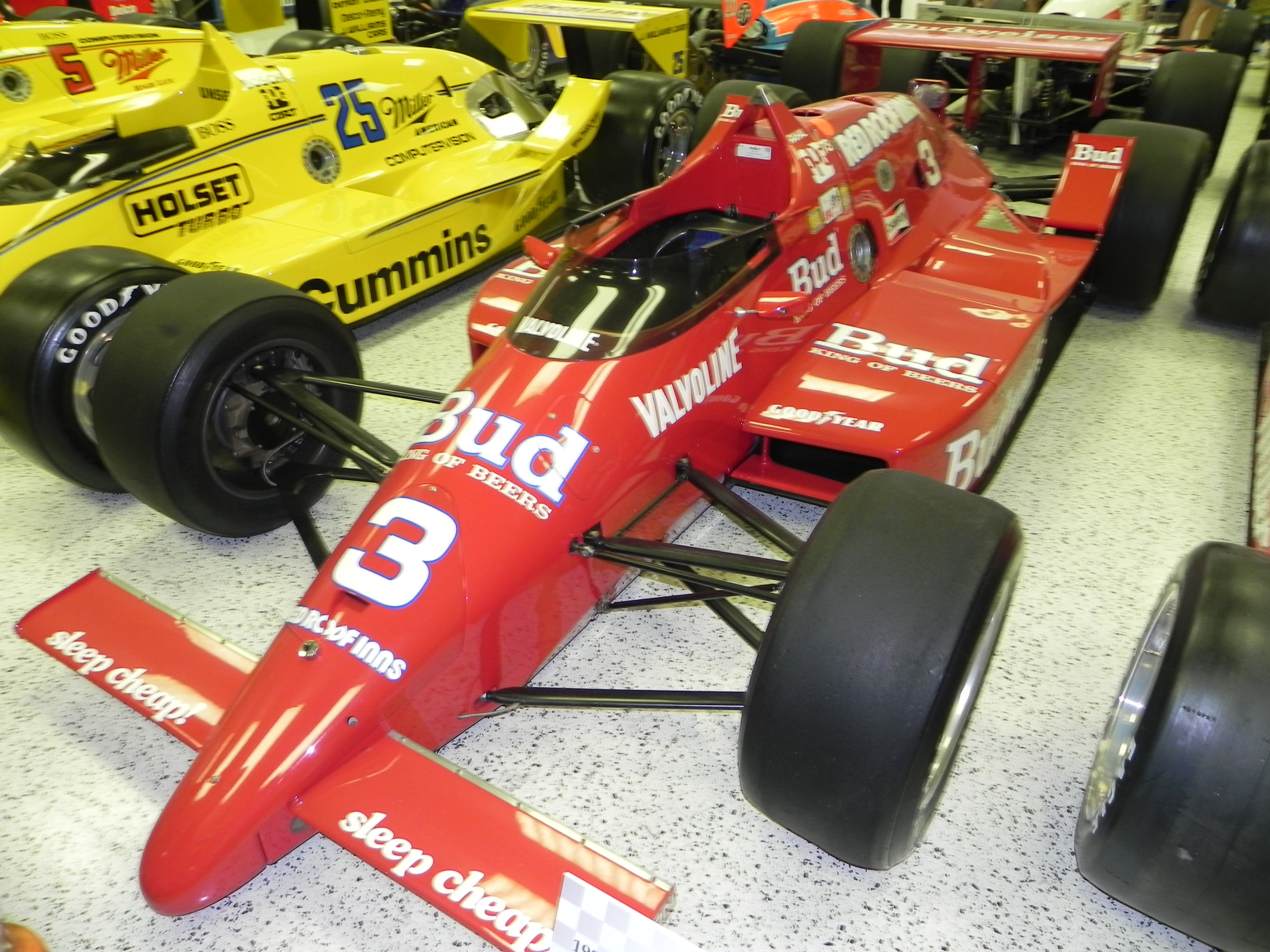
- Winning car of the 1986 Indianapolis 500 (Bobby Rahal)
- Category: CART IndyCar
- Designer: Adrian Newey
- Production: 1986; 38 cars built
- Predecessor: March 85C
- Successor: March 87C

Technical specifications
- Chassis: Aluminium Honeycomb Monocoque
- Suspension (front): Double wishbones
- Engine: Ford-Cosworth DFX 90° V8 Turbocharger; Ilmor-Chevrolet 265-A engine V8 Turbocharger; Buick Indy V6 Turbocharger
- Transmission: Hewland 5-speed manual

Competition history
- Notable entrants: Penske Racing; Truesports
- Notable drivers: (United States) Al Unser (United States) Bobby Rahal

The March 86C is a highly successful and extremely competitive open-wheel race car, designed by Adrian Newey, and built by March Engineering, to compete in the 1986 CART Indy Car season, and eventually the 1987 Indy Car season. The season was another whitewash and a clean-sweep for March, following up on the success of their 1985 campaign. The 86C chassis dominated the season, winning 14 out of the 17 races, and taking 13 pole positions. Newey's March 86C chassis successfully clinched the 1986 CART Indy Car championship and the 1986 Indianapolis 500 with Bobby Rahal. It was primarily powered by the Ford-Cosworth DFX turbo V8 engine, but also used both the Buick Indy V6 turbo engine, and the Ilmor-Chevrolet 265-A Indy V8 turbo engine.

Owing much to its success and competitiveness, the 86C enjoyed extended use on the Indy car circuit after the 1986 season. It was used by some teams in 1987 and 1988. At the 1987 Indianapolis 500, after experiencing difficulties with their in-house PC-16 chassis, the Penske team switched their cars mid-month back to 86C. Rick Mears qualified on the front row, and Al Unser Sr. won the race, giving the 86C back-to-back Indy 500 victories. Later in the year, Mears won the Pocono 500, giving the 86C two wins in 1987.

Later, the chassis saw additional life in the American Indycar Series.
