= IROC XII =

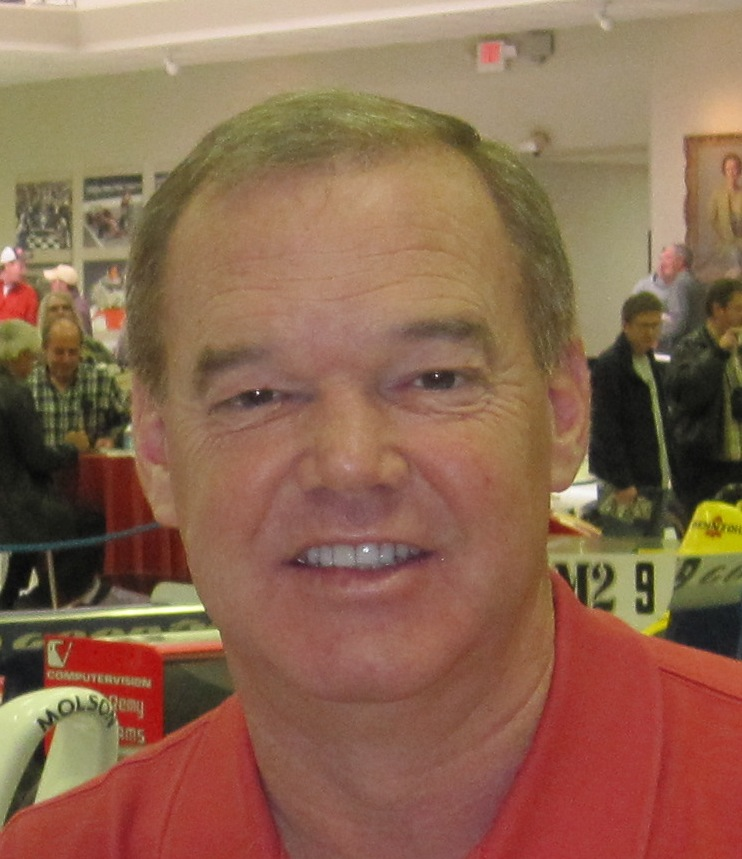
Al Unser Jr. (seen in 2011), the IROC XII champion

IROC XII was the twelfth year of IROC competition took place in 1988. It saw the use of the Chevrolet Camaro in all races, and continued the format introduced in IROC VIII. Race one took place on the Daytona International Speedway, race two took place at Riverside International Raceway, race three ran at Michigan International Speedway, and race four concluded the year at Watkins Glen International. Al Unser Jr. won his second championship and $211,900.

The roster of drivers and final points standings were as follows:

Rank	Driver	Points	Winnings	Series
1	(United States) Al Unser Jr.	66	$211,900	CART PPG IndyCar World Series; 3rd in 1987 IndyCar points 1987 24 Hours of Daytona GTP winner IROC X Champion
2	(United States) Terry Labonte	55	$95,000	NASCAR Winston Cup Series; 3rd in 1987 Winston Cup points
3	(United States) Scott Pruett	51	$72,900	SCCA Trans-Am Series; 1987 Trans-Am Champion; 1987 24 Hours of Daytona GTO winner
4	(United States) Bill Elliott	46	$58,900	NASCAR Winston Cup Series; 2nd in 1987 Winston Cup points 1987 24 Hours of Daytona GTO winner
5	(United States) Dale Earnhardt ^{1}	45	$51,000	NASCAR Winston Cup Series; 1987 Winston Cup Series Champion
6	(United States) Geoff Bodine ^{1}	45	$49,500	NASCAR Winston Cup Series; Defending IROC Champion
7	(United States) Al Holbert	39	$35,000	IMSA Camel GTP; 1987 24 Hours of Daytona GTP winner 1987 24 Hours of Le Mans winner 4th in 1987 IMSA GTP points
8	(United States) Al Unser	38	$34,000	CART PPG IndyCar World Series; 1987 Indianapolis 500 winner IROC V Champion
9	(United States) Chip Robinson	36	$38,000	IMSA Camel GTP; 1987 Camel GTP Champion; 1987 24 Hours of Daytona GTP winner
10	(United States) Chris Cord	26	$32,000	IMSA Camel GTO; 1987 Camel GTO Champion
11	(United States) Bobby Rahal	24	$31,000	CART PPG IndyCar World Series & IMSA Camel GTP; 1987 IndyCar Champion; 1987 12 Hours of Sebring GTP winner 5th in 1987 Camel GTP points
12	(Colombia) Roberto Guerrero	19	$30,400	CART PPG IndyCar World Series; 4th in 1987 IndyCar points

== Race results ==
=== Race One, Daytona International Speedway ===
Friday, February 12, 1988

Finish	Grid	Car no.	Driver	Car Make	Car Color	Laps	Status	Laps Led	Points
1	1	15	(United States) Bill Elliott	Chevrolet Camaro	Gold	40	0:32:13	40	26 (5)
2	6	14	(United States) Dale Earnhardt	Chevrolet Camaro	Lime	40	Flagged		17
3	5	23	(United States) Terry Labonte	Chevrolet Camaro	Pink	40	Flagged		14
4	9	3	(United States) Al Unser Jr.	Chevrolet Camaro	Rose	40	Flagged		12
5	7	12	(United States) Geoff Bodine	Chevrolet Camaro	Red	40	Flagged		10
6	2	17	(United States) Al Unser	Chevrolet Camaro	Silver	40	Flagged		9
7	8	24	(United States) Al Holbert	Chevrolet Camaro	Light Blue	40	Flagged		8
8	11	1	(United States) Scott Pruett	Chevrolet Camaro	Grey	40	Flagged		7
9	10	8	(United States) Chris Cord	Chevrolet Camaro	Orange	40	Flagged		6
10	4	4	(United States) Bobby Rahal	Chevrolet Camaro	Tan	39	Flagged		5
11	3	2	(United States) Chip Robinson	Chevrolet Camaro	Dark Blue	37	Flagged		4
12	12	??	(Colombia) Roberto Guerrero	Chevrolet Camaro	Aqua	0	Did Not Start, Injured		3

(5) Indicates 5 bonus points added to normal race points scored for leading the most laps.
(3) Indicates 3 bonus points added to normal race points scored for leading the 2nd most laps (did not occur in this race so not awarded).
(2) Indicates 2 bonus points added to normal race points scored for leading the 3rd most laps (did not occur in this race so not awarded).

Average speed: 186.239 mph (299.723 km/h)
Cautions: 1
Margin of victory: 2 cl
Lead changes: 0

=== Race Two, Riverside International Raceway ===
Saturday, June 11, 1988

Finish	Grid	Car no.	Driver	Car Make	Car Color	Laps	Status	Laps Led	Points
1	5	8	(United States) Scott Pruett	Chevrolet Camaro	Mustard	30	0:46:34	10	24 (3)
2	2	11	(United States) Chip Robinson	Chevrolet Camaro	Orange	30	Flagged	20	22 (5)
3	9	4	(United States) Al Unser Jr.	Chevrolet Camaro	Dark Orange	30	Flagged		14
4	10	3	(United States) Terry Labonte	Chevrolet Camaro	Lime	30	Flagged		12
5	6	7	(United States) Al Holbert	Chevrolet Camaro	Dark Purple	30	Flagged		10
6	7	6	(United States) Al Unser	Chevrolet Camaro	Silver	30	Flagged		9
7	4	9	(United States) Chris Cord	Chevrolet Camaro	Aqua	30	Flagged		8
8	3	10	(United States) Bobby Rahal	Chevrolet Camaro	Medium Blue	30	Flagged		7
9	8	5	(United States) Geoff Bodine	Chevrolet Camaro	Red	29	Flagged		6
10	12	1	(United States) Bill Elliott	Chevrolet Camaro	Yellow	29	Flagged		5
11	1	12	(Colombia) Roberto Guerrero	Chevrolet Camaro	Purple	10	Crash		4
12	11	2	(United States) Dale Earnhardt	Chevrolet Camaro	Bronze	10	Crash		3

(5) Indicates 5 bonus points added to normal race points scored for leading the most laps.
(3) Indicates 3 bonus points added to normal race points scored for leading the 2nd most laps
(2) Indicates 2 bonus points added to normal race points scored for leading the 3rd most laps (did not occur in this race so not awarded).

Average speed: 98.182 mph (158.009 km/h)
Cautions: 2
Margin of victory: 2 sec
Lead changes: 1 Lap Leader Breakdown

Driver	From Lap	To Lap	Number of Laps
Chip Robinson	1	20	20
Scott Pruett	21	30	10

=== Race Three, Michigan International Speedway ===
Saturday, August 6, 1988

Finish	Grid	Car no.	Driver	Car Make	Car Color	Laps	Status	Laps Led	Points
1	3	9	(United States) Geoff Bodine	Chevrolet Camaro	Yellow	50	0:37:38	46	26 (5)
2	6	6	(United States) Dale Earnhardt	Chevrolet Camaro	Dark Blue	50	Flagged		17
3	8	4	(United States) Al Unser Jr.	Chevrolet Camaro	Lime	50	Flagged		14
4	7	5	(United States) Terry Labonte	Chevrolet Camaro	Orange	50	Flagged		12
5	4	8	(United States) Al Unser	Chevrolet Camaro	Blue	50	Flagged		10
6	5	7	(United States) Al Holbert	Chevrolet Camaro	White	50	Flagged		9
7	10	2	(United States) Bill Elliott	Chevrolet Camaro	Silver	50	Flagged		8
8	2	11	(United States) Bobby Rahal	Chevrolet Camaro	Aqua	50	Flagged		7
9	11	1	(United States) Scott Pruett	Chevrolet Camaro	Pink	50	Flagged		6
10	1	12	(Colombia) Roberto Guerrero	Chevrolet Camaro	Tan	50	Flagged	4	8 (3)
11	9	3	(United States) Chip Robinson	Chevrolet Camaro	Black	50	Flagged		4
12	X	10	(United States) Chris Cord	Chevrolet Camaro	Not assigned	0	Did Not Start, Injured		3

(5) Indicates 5 bonus points added to normal race points scored for leading the most laps.
(3) Indicates 3 bonus points added to normal race points scored for leading the 2nd most laps
(2) Indicates 2 bonus points added to normal race points scored for leading the 3rd most laps (did not occur in this race so not awarded).

Average speed: 159.432 mph (256.581 km/h)
Cautions: none
Margin of victory: 0.78 sec
Lead changes: 1 Lap Leader Breakdown

Driver	From Lap	To Lap	Number of Laps
Roberto Guerrero	1	4	4
Geoff Bodine	5	50	46

=== Race Four, Watkins Glen International ===
Saturday, August 13, 1988

Finish	Grid	Car no.	Driver	Car Make	Car Color	Laps	Status	Laps Led	Points
1	2	2	(United States) Al Unser Jr.	Chevrolet Camaro	Silver	30	0:39:22	30	26 (5)
2	4	4	(United States) Terry Labonte	Chevrolet Camaro	Lime	30	Flagged		17
3	6	6	(United States) Scott Pruett	Chevrolet Camaro	White	30	Flagged		14
4	9	9	(United States) Al Holbert	Chevrolet Camaro	Blue	30	Flagged		12
5	8	8	(United States) Al Unser	Chevrolet Camaro	Aqua	30	Flagged		10
6	11	11	(United States) Chris Cord	Chevrolet Camaro	Orange	30	Flagged		9
7	5	5	(United States) Dale Earnhardt	Chevrolet Camaro	Red	30	Flagged		8
8	3	3	(United States) Bill Elliott	Chevrolet Camaro	Rose	30	Flagged		7
9	7	7	(United States) Chip Robinson	Chevrolet Camaro	Powder Blue	29	Flagged		6
10	10	10	(United States) Bobby Rahal	Chevrolet Camaro	Purple	29	Flagged		5
11	12	12	(Colombia) Roberto Guerrero	Chevrolet Camaro	Dark Blue	20	Flagged		4
12	1	1	(United States) Geoff Bodine	Chevrolet Camaro	Gold	16	Crash		3

(5) Indicates 5 bonus points added to normal race points scored for leading the most laps.
(3) Indicates 3 bonus points added to normal race points scored for leading the 2nd most laps (did not occur in this race so not awarded).
(2) Indicates 2 bonus points added to normal race points scored for leading the 3rd most laps (did not occur in this race so not awarded).

Average speed: 110.924 mph (178.515 km/h)
Cautions: 3
Margin of victory: 1.58 sec
Lead changes: 0

== Notes ==
1. Dale Earnhardt and Geoff Bodine tied for fifth place in the championship standings, but Earnhardt was awarded the position due to a higher finishing position in the final race.
