= IROC XI =

Motor car races held in 1987

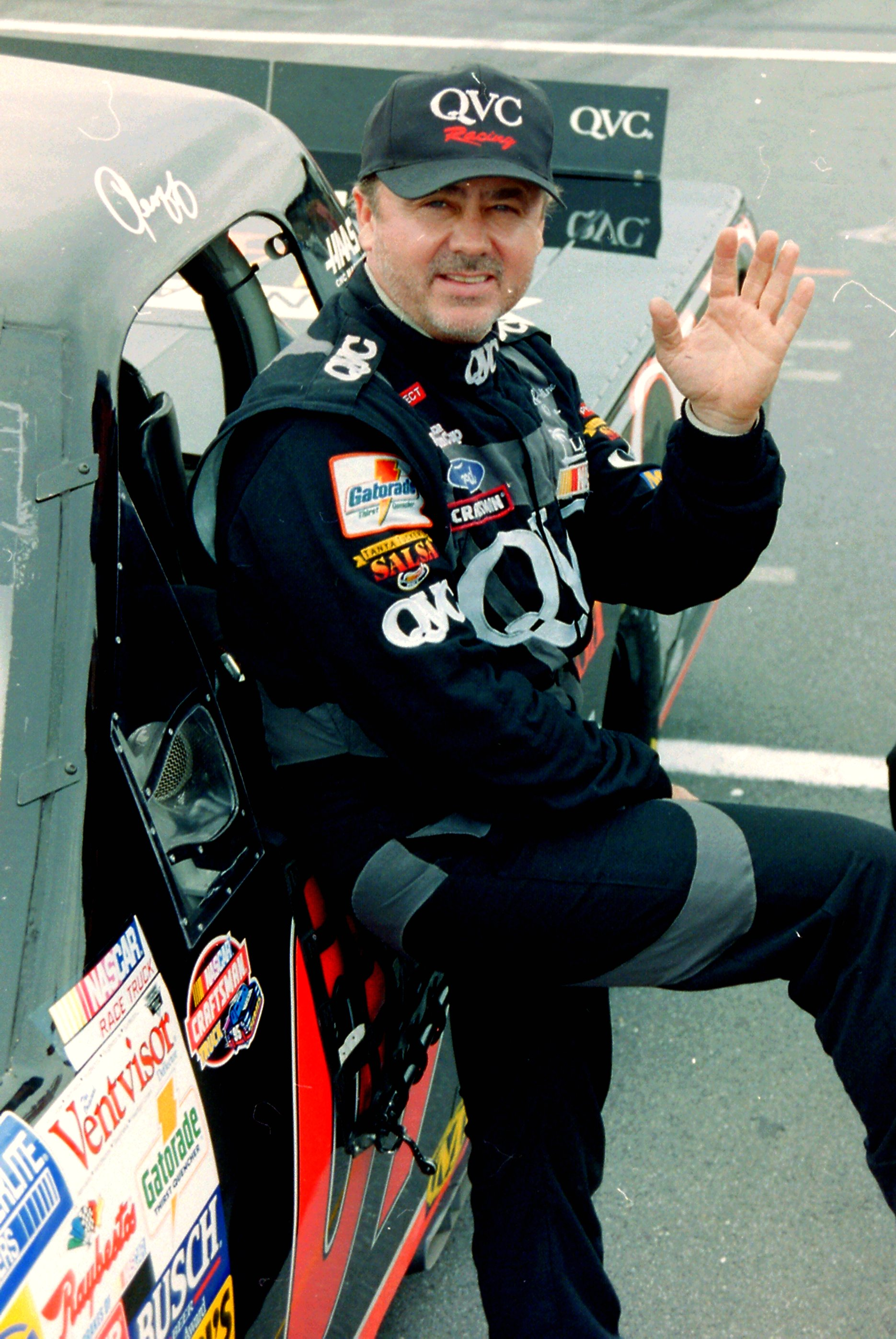
Geoff Bodine (seen in 1996), the IROC XI champion

IROC XI was the eleventh year of IROC competition, which took place in 1987. It saw the use of the Chevrolet Camaro in all races, the beginning of a long partnership with ABC/ESPN, and continued the format introduced in IROC VIII. Race one took place on the Daytona International Speedway, race two took place at Mid-Ohio, race three ran at Michigan International Speedway, and race four concluded the year at Watkins Glen International. Geoff Bodine won the championship and $191,900.

The roster of drivers and final points standings were as follows:

Rank	Driver	Points	Winnings	Series and reason for invite
1	(United States) Geoff Bodine	76	$191,900	NASCAR Winston Cup Series; 1986 Daytona 500 winner
2	(United States) Al Unser Jr.	65	$90,400	CART PPG IndyCar World Series; 1986 & 1987 24 Hours of Daytona GTP winner Defending IROC Champion
3	(United States) Bobby Rahal	51	$57,800	CART PPG IndyCar World Series; 1986 Indy 500 Winner & 1986 IndyCar Champion
4	(United States) Wally Dallenbach Jr.	43	$43,400	SCCA Trans-Am Series; 1986 Trans-Am Series Champion
5	(United States) Darrell Waltrip	42	$44,500	NASCAR Winston Cup; 2nd in 1986 Winston Cup points
6	(United States) Bill Elliott	38	$34,400	NASCAR Winston Cup; 4th in 1986 Winston Cup points 1987 24 Hours of Daytona GTO winner
7	(United States) Michael Andretti	33	$35,000	CART PPG IndyCar World Series; 2nd in 1986 IndyCar points
8	(United States) Scott Pruett	32	$29,000	IMSA Camel GTO & SCCA Trans-Am Series; 1986 Camel GTO Champion; 1986 12 Hours of Sebring GTO winner 1987 24 Hours of Daytona GTO winner
9	(United States) Mario Andretti	31	$28,100	CART PPG IndyCar World Series; 5th in 1986 IndyCar points IROC VI champion
10	(United States) Dale Earnhardt	30	$30,000	NASCAR Winston Cup Series; 1986 Winston Cup Champion
11	(United States) Al Unser	27	$26,000	CART PPG IndyCar World Series; IROC V Champion
12	(United Kingdom) Derek Bell	27	$25,000	World Sports-Prototype Championship & IMSA Camel GTP; 1986 & 1987 24 Hours of Daytona GTP winner 1986 24 Hours of Le Mans Winner; 1986 World Sportscar Prototype Champion; 3rd in 1986 Camel GTP points

== Race results ==
=== Race One, Daytona International Speedway ===
Friday, February 13, 1987

Finish	Grid	Car no.	Driver	Car Make	Car Color	Laps	Status	Laps Led	Points
1	5	2	(United States) Geoff Bodine	Chevrolet Camaro	Dark Blue	40	0:32:40	21	26 (5)
2	8	12	(United States) Dale Earnhardt	Chevrolet Camaro	Dark Red	40	Flagged		17
3	1	7	(United States) Darrell Waltrip	Chevrolet Camaro	Blue	40	Flagged		14
4	4	5	(United States) Bill Elliott	Chevrolet Camaro	Powder Blue	40	Flagged	14	15 (3)
5	7	6	(United States) Al Unser Jr.	Chevrolet Camaro	Yellow	40	Flagged		10
6	2	1	(United States) Wally Dallenbach Jr.	Chevrolet Camaro	White	39	Flagged	4	11 (2)
7	6	8	(United States) Mario Andretti	Chevrolet Camaro	Black	35	Flagged	1	8
8	12	20	(United States) Bobby Rahal	Chevrolet Camaro	Purple	31	Flagged		7
9	3	18	(United Kingdom) Derek Bell	Chevrolet Camaro	Light Blue	30	Engine		6
10	10	17	(United States) Al Unser	Chevrolet Camaro	Silver	16	Crash		5
11	9	4	(United States) Scott Pruett	Chevrolet Camaro	Rose	16	Crash		4
12	11	8	(United States) Michael Andretti	Chevrolet Camaro	Orange	1	Crash		3

(5) Indicates 5 bonus points added to normal race points scored for leading the most laps.
(3) Indicates 3 bonus points added to normal race points scored for leading the 2nd most laps
(2) Indicates 2 bonus points added to normal race points scored for leading the 3rd most laps.

Average speed: 183.673 mph (295.593 km/h)
Cautions: 3
Margin of victory: 1 cl
Lead changes: 5

=== Race Two, Mid-Ohio Sports Car Course ===
Saturday, June 6, 1987

Finish	Grid	Car no.	Driver	Car Make	Car Color	Laps	Status	Laps Led	Points
1	5	10	(United States) Bobby Rahal	Chevrolet Camaro	Orange-Red	29	0:48:44	9	24 (3)
2	7	20	(United States) Wally Dallenbach Jr.	Chevrolet Camaro	Purple	29	Flagged		17
3	1	5	(United States) Michael Andretti	Chevrolet Camaro	Powder Blue	29	Flagged	20	19 (5)
4	8	18	(United States) Al Unser Jr.	Chevrolet Camaro	Teal	29	Flagged		12
5	12	1	(United States) Geoff Bodine	Chevrolet Camaro	White	29	Flagged		10
6	4	11	(United Kingdom) Derek Bell	Chevrolet Camaro	Red	29	Flagged		9
7	9	7	(United States) Bill Elliott	Chevrolet Camaro	Blue	29	Flagged		8
8	6	6	(United States) Mario Andretti	Chevrolet Camaro	Yellow	29	Flagged		7
9	2	9	(United States) Scott Pruett	Chevrolet Camaro	Gold	29	Flagged		6
10	3	12	(United States) Al Unser	Chevrolet Camaro	Dark Red	29	Flagged		5
11	11	2	(United States) Dale Earnhardt	Chevrolet Camaro	Dark Blue	29	Flagged		4
12	10	8	(United States) Darrell Waltrip	Chevrolet Camaro	Orange	23	Spin		3

(5) Indicates 5 bonus points added to normal race points scored for leading the most laps.
(3) Indicates 3 bonus points added to normal race points scored for leading the 2nd most laps
(2) Indicates 2 bonus points added to normal race points scored for leading the 3rd most laps (did not occur in this race so not awarded).

Average speed: 85.702 mph
Cautions: none
Margin of victory: 1.7 sec
Lead changes: 1

Lap Leader Breakdown

Driver	From Lap	To Lap	Number of Laps
Michael Andretti	1	20	20
Bobby Rahall	21	29	9

=== Race Three, Michigan International Speedway ===
Saturday, August 1, 1987

Finish	Grid	Car no.	Driver	Car Make	Car Color	Laps	Status	Laps Led	Points
1	7	6	(United States) Al Unser Jr.	Chevrolet Camaro	Powder Blue	50	0:38:53	26	26 (5)
2	5	17	(United States) Darrell Waltrip	Chevrolet Camaro	Silver	50	Flagged	24	20 (3)
3	12	3	(United States) Geoff Bodine	Chevrolet Camaro	Rose	50	Flagged		14
4	10	1	(United States) Wally Dallenbach Jr.	Chevrolet Camaro	White	50	Flagged		12
5	2	8	(United States) Scott Pruett	Chevrolet Camaro	Orange	50	Flagged		10
6	1	12	(United States) Al Unser	Chevrolet Camaro	Dark Red	50	Flagged		9
7	4	6	(United Kingdom) Derek Bell	Chevrolet Camaro	Yellow	50	Flagged		8
8	3	22	(United States) Mario Andretti	Chevrolet Camaro	Black	50	Flagged		7
9	11	15	(United States) Bobby Rahal	Chevrolet Camaro	Gold	50	Flagged		6
10	9	4	(United States) Bill Elliott	Chevrolet Camaro	Cream	50	Flagged		5
11	8	2	(United States) Michael Andretti	Chevrolet Camaro	Dark Blue	47	Flagged		4
12	6	14	(United States) Dale Earnhardt	Chevrolet Camaro	Lime	12	Crash		3

(5) Indicates 5 bonus points added to normal race points scored for leading the most laps.
(3) Indicates 3 bonus points added to normal race points scored for leading the 2nd most laps
(2) Indicates 2 bonus points added to normal race points scored for leading the 3rd most laps (did not occur in this race so not awarded).

Average speed: 155.633 mph
Cautions: 1 (Lap 12, Dale Earnhardt crash)
Margin of victory: .03 sec
Lead changes: 6

=== Race Four, Watkins Glen International ===
Saturday, August 8, 1987

Finish	Grid	Car no.	Driver	Car Make	Car Color	Laps	Status	Laps Led	Points
1	1	9	(United States) Geoff Bodine	Chevrolet Camaro	Mustard	30	0:39:34	30	26 (5)
2	2	3	(United States) Al Unser Jr.	Chevrolet Camaro	Rose	30	Flagged		17
3	5	7	(United States) Bobby Rahal	Chevrolet Camaro	Blue	30	Flagged		14
4	11	5	(United States) Scott Pruett	Chevrolet Camaro	Powder Blue	30	Flagged		12
5	6	22	(United States) Bill Elliott	Chevrolet Camaro	Black	30	Flagged		10
6	10	20	(United States) Mario Andretti	Chevrolet Camaro	Purple	30	Flagged		9
7	12	6	(United States) Al Unser	Chevrolet Camaro	Yellow	30	Flagged		8
8	7	8	(United States) Michael Andretti	Chevrolet Camaro	Orange	30	Flagged		7
9	8	18	(United States) Dale Earnhardt	Chevrolet Camaro	Light Blue	30	Flagged		6
10	4	11	(United States) Darrell Waltrip	Chevrolet Camaro	Dark Red	30	Flagged		5
11	9	10	(United Kingdom) Derek Bell	Chevrolet Camaro	Red	30	Flagged		4
12	3	17	(United States) Wally Dallenbach Jr.	Chevrolet Camaro	Silver	30	Flagged		3

(5) Indicates 5 bonus points added to normal race points scored for leading the most laps.
(3) Indicates 3 bonus points added to normal race points scored for leading the 2nd most laps (did not occur in this race so not awarded).
(2) Indicates 2 bonus points added to normal race points scored for leading the 3rd most laps (did not occur in this race so not awarded).

Average speed: 110.457 mph (177.763 km/h)
Cautions: none
Margin of victory: 2.02 sec
Lead changes: 0
