= 1987 Champ Car season =

The 1987 Champ Car season may refer to:

- the 1986–87 USAC Championship Car season, which was just one race, the 71st Indianapolis 500
- the 1987 CART PPG Indy Car World Series, sanctioned by CART, who would later become Champ Car
