= Al Unser =

American racing driver (1939–2021)

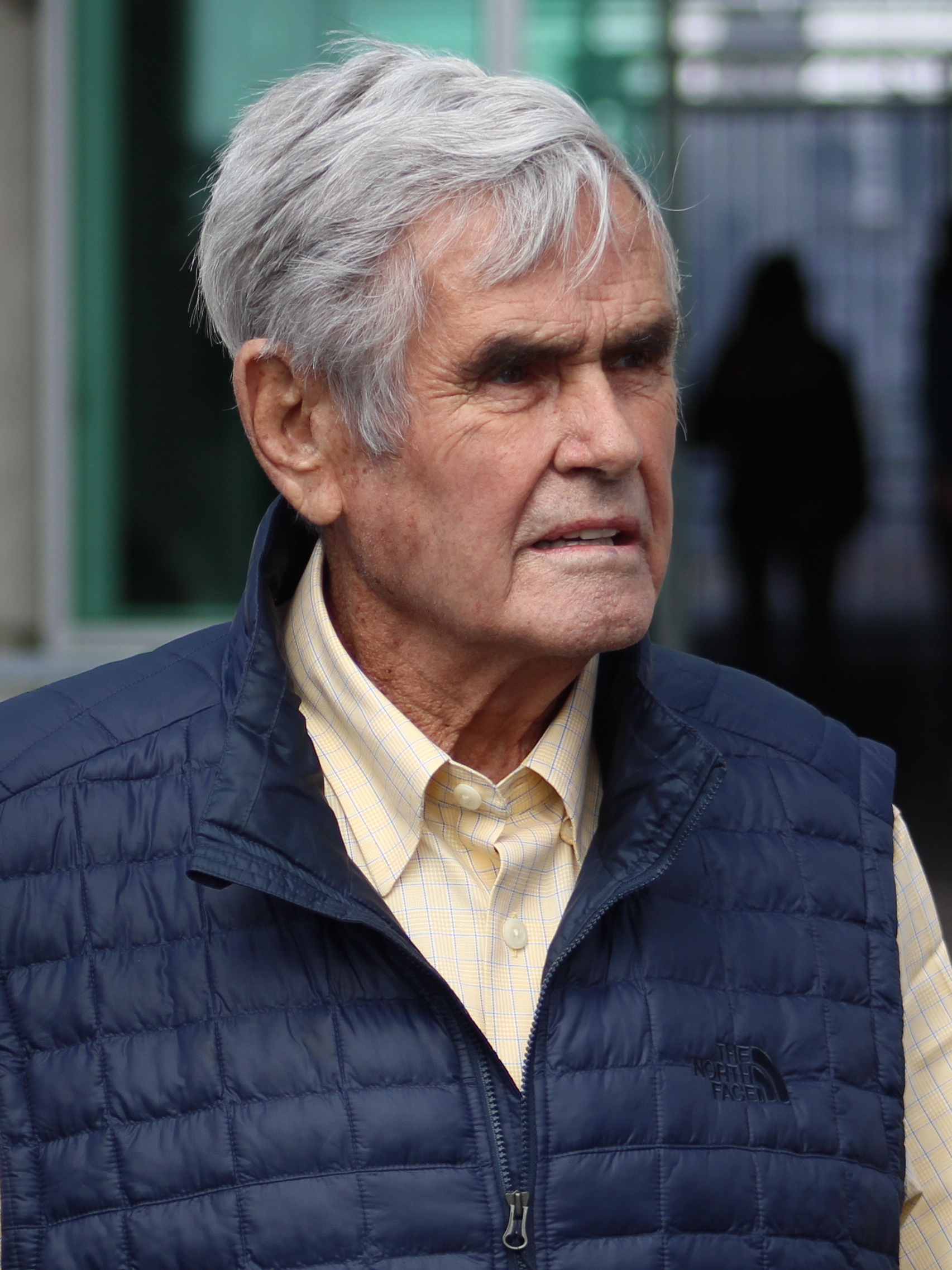
- Unser in June 2021
- Born: Alfred Unser; May 29, 1939 Albuquerque, New Mexico, U.S.
- Died: December 9, 2021 (aged 82) Chama, New Mexico, U.S.

Championship titles
- USAC/CART Championship Car (1970, 1983, 1985); USAC Silver Crown (1973); Major victories Pikes Peak Hill Climb (1964, 1965); Indianapolis 500 (1970, 1971, 1978, 1987); Pocono 500 (1976, 1978); California 500 (1977, 1978); 24 Hours of Daytona (1985)

Champ Car career
- 321 races run over 30 years
- Best finish: 1st (1970, 1983, 1985)
- First race: 1964 Tony Bettenhausen 200 (Milwaukee)
- Last race: 1993 Indianapolis 500 (Indianapolis)
- First win: 1965 Pikes Peak Hill Climb (Pikes Peak)
- Last win: 1987 Indianapolis 500 (Indianapolis)
Wins	Podiums	Poles
39	98	28

NASCAR Cup Series career
- 5 races run over 3 years
- Best finish: 106th (1986)
- First race: 1968 Motor Trend 500 (Riverside)
- Last race: 1986 Winston Western 500 (Riverside)
Wins	Top tens	Poles
0	3	0

Alfred Unser (May 29, 1939 – December 9, 2021) was an American automobile racing driver, the younger brother of fellow racing drivers Jerry and Bobby Unser, and father of Al Unser Jr. He was the second of four men (A. J. Foyt, himself, Rick Mears and Hélio Castroneves) to have won the Indianapolis 500 four times (1970, 1971, 1978, 1987), the fourth of six to have won the race in consecutive years, and the winner of the National Championship in 1970, 1983, and 1985. The Unser family has won the Indy 500 a record nine times. He was the only person to have both a sibling (Bobby) and child (Al Jr.) as fellow Indy 500 winners. Al's nephews Johnny and Robby Unser have also competed in that race. In 1971, he became the only driver to date to win the race on his birthday (his 32nd).

After his son Al Unser Jr. joined the national championship circuit in 1983, Unser was generally known professionally by the retronym "Al Unser Sr." He was also nicknamed "Big Al", and Al Unser Jr. was likewise nicknamed "Little Al".

== Personal life ==
Unser was born in Albuquerque, New Mexico, the youngest of four sons of Mary Catherine (Craven) and Jerome Henry "Jerry" Unser. His father and two uncles, Louis and Joe, were also drivers. Beginning in 1926 they competed in the Pikes Peak International Hill Climb, an annual road race held in Colorado. Joe Unser became the first member of the Unser family to lose his life to the sport, killed while test-driving an FWD Coleman Special on the Denver highway in 1929.

Unser's oldest brother Jerry became the first Unser to drive at the Indianapolis Motor Speedway, qualifying 23rd and finishing 31st in the 1958 Indianapolis 500. However, tragedy struck the next year when he was killed by injuries sustained in a fiery crash during a practice session.

Middle brother Bobby drove in his first Indianapolis 500 in 1963. In 1968, he became the first family member to win. He went on to win the race a total of three times. Son Al Unser Jr. drove in his first Indy 500 in 1983, winning twice. His mother Mary "Mom" Unser became a popular a fixture at the track. Each year she treated the participants to a chili cookout in the garage area. She died on December 18, 1975.

Unser married Wanda Jesperson in 1958 and they had three children- Alfred Jr., Mary, and Deborah. Deborah was killed in a dune buggy accident in 1982. Al and Wanda divorced in 1971. Unser married Karen Sue Barnes on November 22, 1977. Karen and Al divorced in 1988. Unser was later married to Susan, who survived him.

Unser, with his family, owned and operated the Unser Racing Museum on Montano Blvd. in Albuquerque, New Mexico. The city dedicated a road as Unser Boulevard, a north-south arterial road on the city's west side, in his honor, ultimately taking ownership of the property in May of 2025.

== Racing career and Indianapolis 500 ==
=== USAC and Indycar ===
Unser began racing in 1957, at the age of eighteen, initially competing primarily in modified roadsters, sprint cars and midgets. In 1965, he raced in the Indianapolis 500 for the first time and finished ninth. His breakout year in IndyCar's was in 1970 when he joined Vel's Parnelli Jones Racing, where he would drive for the next seven years.

Unser won the Indianapolis 500 in 1970, two years after his brother, Bobby. During the race, he led for all but ten of the 200 laps and averaged 155.749 miles per hour (250.654 km/h). His quick pit stops were a factor in the victory, as well as the fact that VPJ had an insurmountable advantage over the field that year. That season, he won a record ten times on oval, road and dirt tracks to capture the United States Auto Club national championship. Unser competed in USAC's Stock Car division in 1967, and was the series Rookie of the Year.

In 1971, with Vel's Parnelli Jones, he won the Indianapolis 500 again, starting from the fifth position with an average speed of 157.735 miles per hour (253.850 km/h), and holding off Peter Revson's McLaren for the victory. Unser's bid to become the first three-time consecutive Indy 500 champion was thwarted when he finished second to Mark Donohue in the 1972 Indianapolis 500. Unser would continue driving for the team up until 1977. During a few of those years, VPJ lost their competitive edge after changing their chassis, as well as their failed F1 bid. By 1977, the team regained competitive form, although Unser would announce his departure for Jim Hall Racing at year's end. Unser would later say, in a 2020 interview, that his departure from VPJ stemmed from disagreements with Jones and his partners over the direction of the team, although Unser maintained a friendship with Jones.

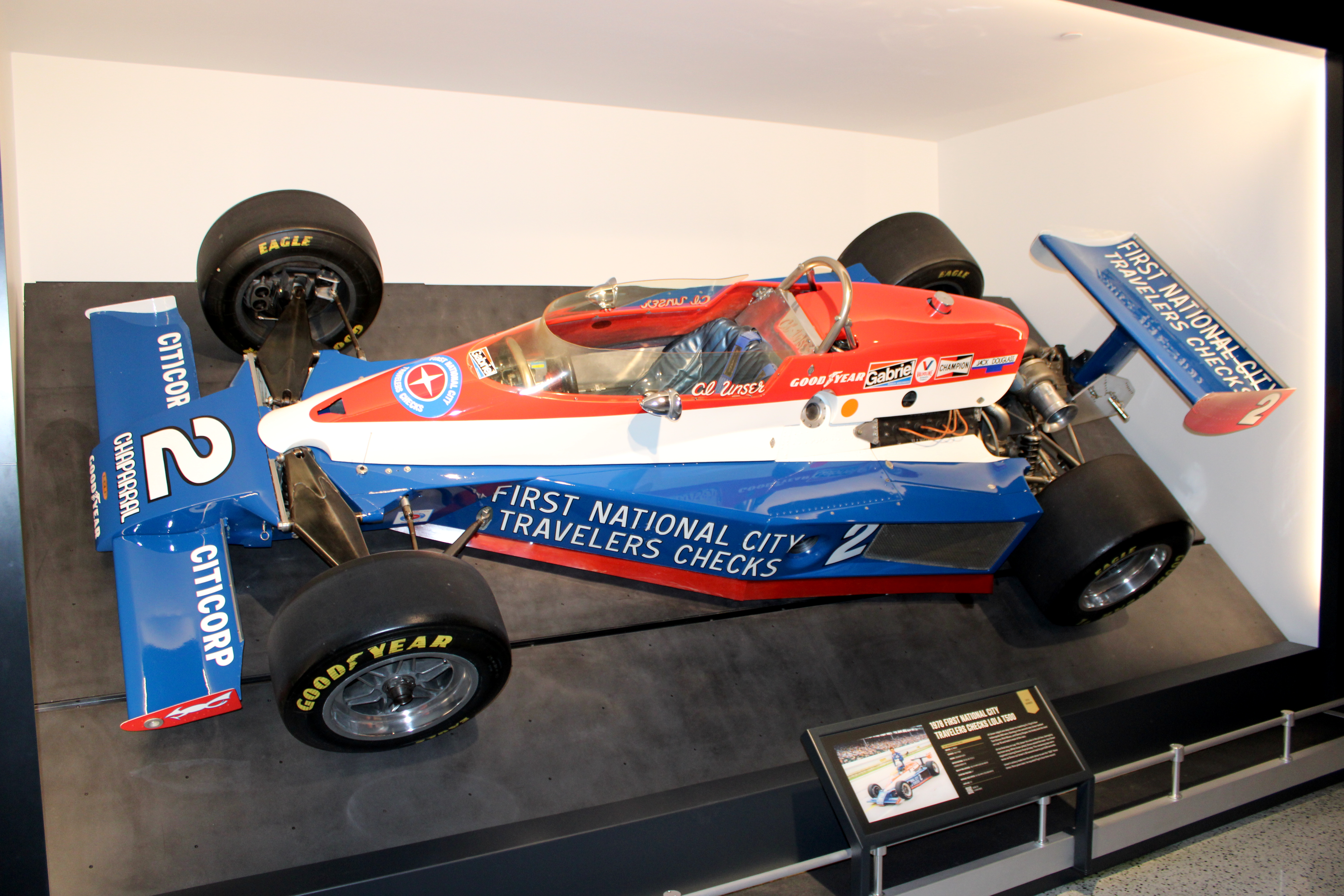
Al Unser's 1978 First National City Travelers Checks Lola T500 on display at the Indianapolis Motor Speedway Museum

Despite starting the 1978 Indianapolis 500 from the fifth position in a First National City Travelers Checks Chaparral Lola, Unser's car was considered before the race to be a second-tier entry at best, if not an outright long shot to win. Moving to the front of the field for the first time on lap 75, he and opponent Danny Ongais engaged in an on-again off-again duel for 75 more laps, before an engine failure on Ongais' car on lap 150 allowed Unser to assume a commanding 35 second lead. Although suffering right front-wing misalignment due to impacting a tire on his final pit stop, a situation that led to the lead shrinking steadily over the race's final twenty laps, it nevertheless proved wide enough for victory by nine seconds to spare at the checkered flag. Unser's race average speed of 161.363 mph (259.689 km/h) ranked as the then-second fastest ever run (one mile per hour less than the then-1972 record), and would not itself be topped for second for four more years.

In 1979, Unser departed Jim Hall's team for the Longhorn Racing Team owned by Bobby Hillin Sr.. Although Unser went winless for three seasons, he would later say that driving for the Hillin family was his most joyful experience as a driver before his successful Penske years. The team folded operations after three years, putting Unser out of a ride.

In the 1983 season, Unser joined Team Penske and drove for four years in a Penske-owned car. Unser controlled the late stages of the 1983 Indianapolis 500, leading 61 laps. With less than twenty laps to go, Unser got challenges from Tom Sneva who led the most laps. With help from his son - who was several laps down - Unser began pulling away from Sneva. However Sneva got by Al Jr., and set sail for Unser Sr.. Sneva caught up to Unser within one lap of passing Al Jr., and passed him to retake the lead with nine laps to go. Sneva then easily pulled away to win the race by eleven seconds, avenging his firing from the team in 1978. After the race, Unser Jr. was penalized two laps for his actions as well as having passed two cars under caution on lap 170.

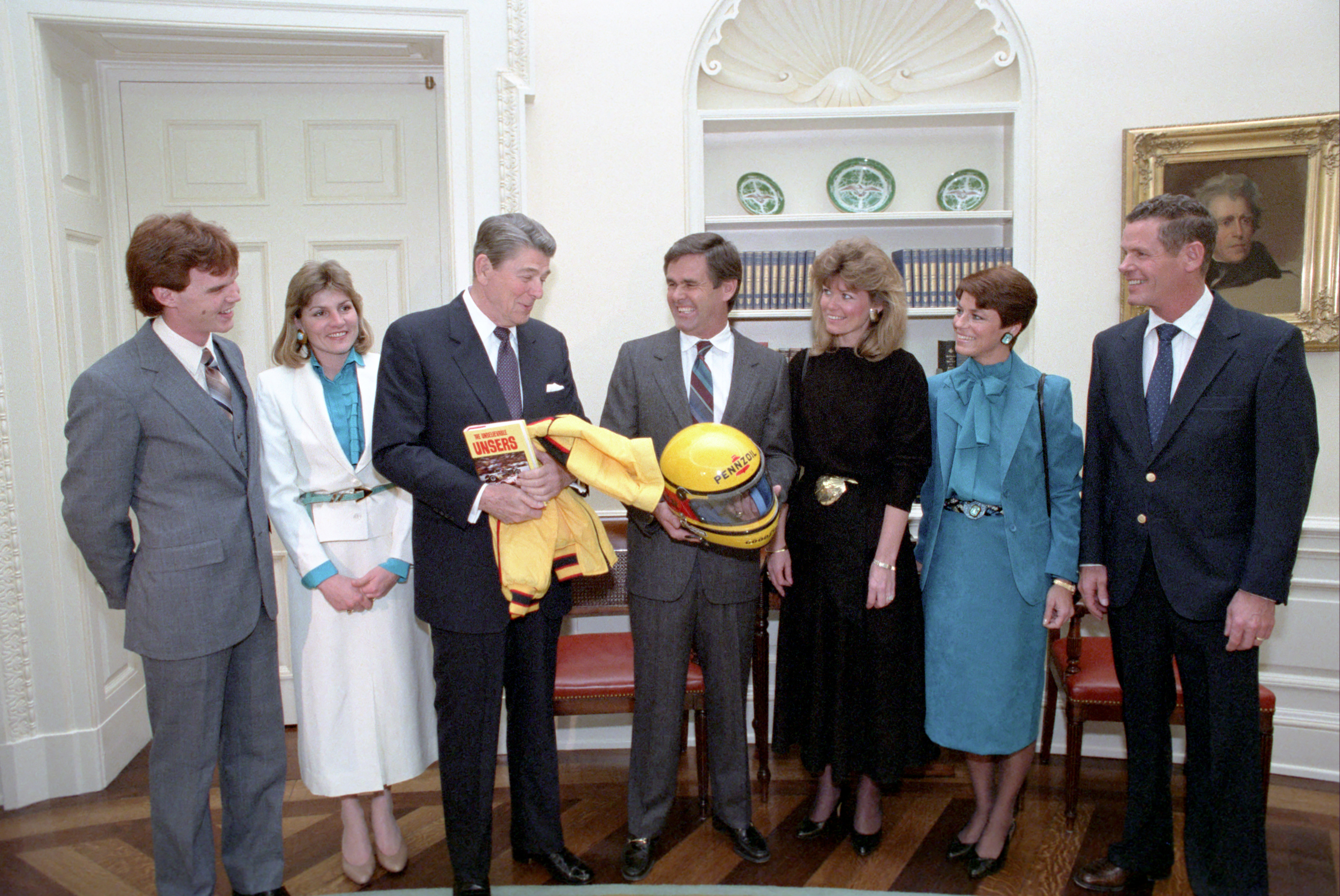
Unser (center, holding helmet) visiting United States president Ronald Reagan in January 1986 along with his wife Karen, his brother Bobby Unser and his wife, and his son Al Unser Jr. and his wife.

Unser won the IndyCar championships in 1983 and 1985 by winning one race and then having several top-five finishes. In 1986, Penske decided to focus the team's attention on teammate Rick Mears when he healed from serious injuries. As a result, Unser cut down his schedule to only a few IndyCar races a year, which he would do going forward.

=== NASCAR and IROC ===
Outside of his open-wheel career, Unser was a semi-regular competitor in IROC, winning three races and the 1977-1978 championship. His final IROC start was an eleventh place finish at the 1993 Michigan race after winning the pole.

Unser also started five races in NASCAR, three in the late 1960s and two in 1986. His best finishes were a pair of fourth place results, one at the 1968 Daytona 500 and the other at the 1969 Motor Trend 500 at Riverside International Raceway. He fared less well in two 1986 starts, finishing 29th at Watkins Glen and twentieth at Riverside.

== Fourth Indianapolis 500 victory ==
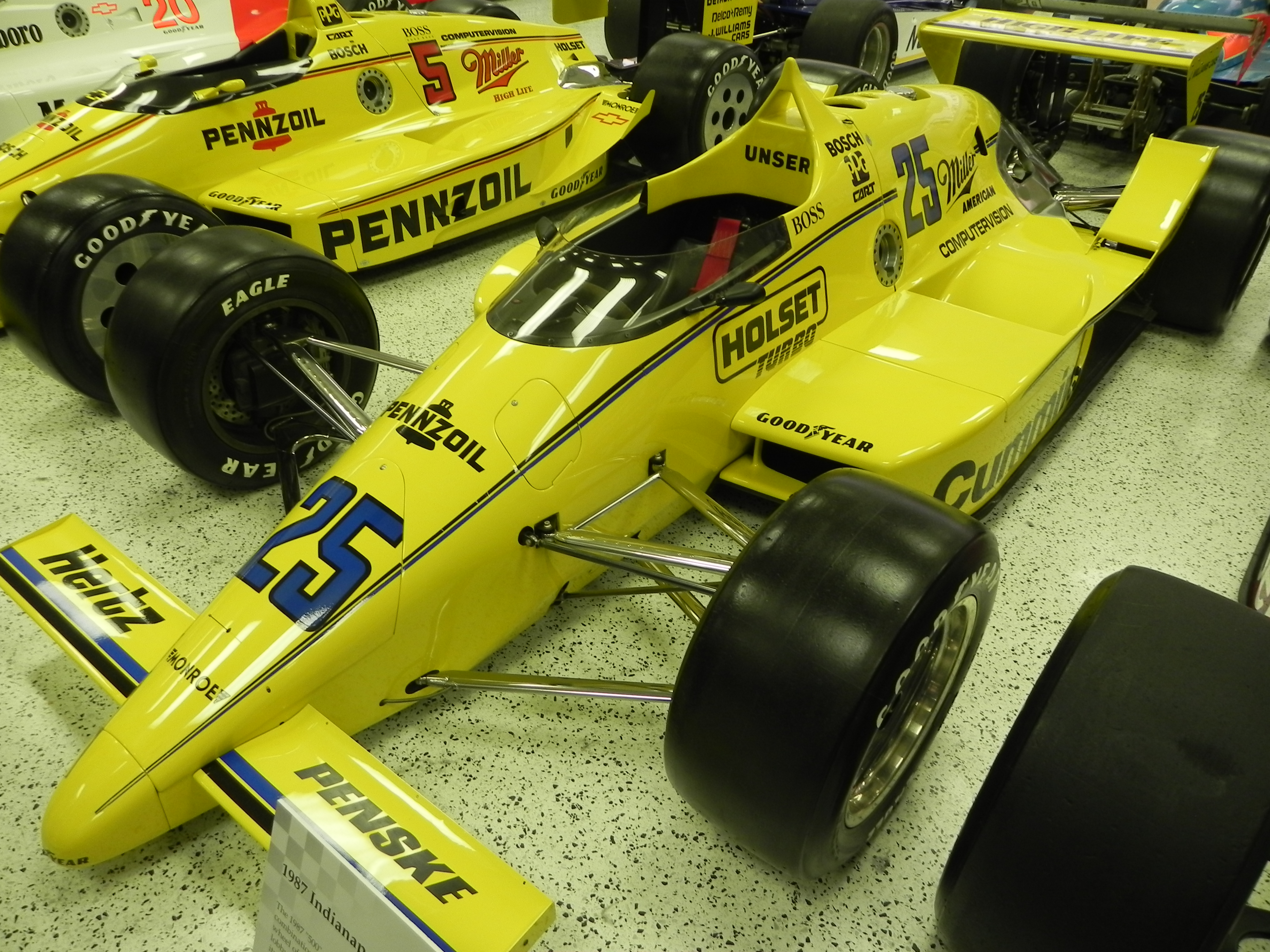
Al Unser's 1987 Indy 500 winning car

In 1987, Penske's slate of drivers included Rick Mears, Danny Sullivan, and Danny Ongais. Unser was dropped from the team, and entered the month of May without a ride. During the first week of practice, Al Sr. spent much of the week shopping for a ride, and a few offers were made by owners. Unser, however, refused the offers, as he insisted on landing a ride in a competitive, well-funded car only. Unser planned on staying through the week, and if he did not have a ride by the end of the first week of time trials, he was planning to return home. Coincidentally, his son Al Unser Jr. (driving for Shierson Racing) was having difficulty with his car's handling. At the end of the first weekend of time trials, Al Jr. surprisingly had not yet qualified. Al Sr. agreed to stay through the week in order to help his son get his car up to speed.

Danny Ongais crashed into the wall during the first week of practice, suffering a serious concussion, and was declared unfit to drive. Meanwhile, the Penske team's new Penske PC-16 chassis had been uncompetitive during practice. By the end of the first week of practice, Penske parked the PC-16s and elected to qualify back-up cars for the race. Mears and Sullivan were provided 1986 March-Ilmor Chevrolet machines, while a third car, a 1986 March-Cosworth, was planned for third driver.

Midway through the second week of practice, Roger Penske consummated a deal with Unser to drive the third car. Penske promised Unser a well-funded effort, and a brand new Cosworth engine, the same chassis/engine combination that had won the previous four Indy 500s. The year-old March was removed from a Penske Racing display at a Sheraton hotel in the team's hometown of Reading, Pennsylvania, and hurriedly prepared for a return to active competition. Unser easily put the car in the field on the third day of time trials.

At the start, Unser was in the twentieth position. On a day when heavy attrition felled most of the field's front-runners, including the overwhelmingly dominant Newman-Haas entry of Mario Andretti, Unser worked his way steadily forward and took the lead on the 183rd lap, after Roberto Guerrero's car stalled on his final pit stop. Averaging 162.175 mph (260.995 km/h), Unser bested a charging Guerrero by 4.5 seconds to win his fourth Indy 500, only five days before his 48th birthday. In doing so he tied Foyt as the winningest Indy 500 driver and broke brother Bobby's record as the oldest Indy winner.

Unser rode the wave of his fourth Indy victory to secure a ride at Penske for the Michigan 500, Pocono 500, and Marlboro Challenge for 1987. Near the end of the year, Unser had two other starts. He drove as a substitute for Roberto Guerrero at Nazareth, and had a competitive run until crashing a few laps short of the finish. He was then hired to drive the brand new Porsche Indy car at Laguna Seca. The team was still in its infancy, and the car dropped out. Unser left the team after only one race.

In 1988 and 1989, Unser returned to Penske to secure a ride at the three 500-miles races (Indianapolis, Michigan, Pocono). Unser appeared headed for a third Pocono 500 victory during the 1988 Pocono 500 until he suffered ignition failure while leading with 28 laps remaining. Unser had led a race-high 79 laps.

== Retirement ==
After reorganization at Team Penske in 1990, Unser was finally crowded out of his part-time ride. With competitive rides filling up, and his career winding down, he joined the sub-par Patrick Racing Alfa Romeo team for 1990. After finishing 13th at Indy, Unser returned to the team for the Michigan 500. A broken right-front push-rod after only six practice laps led to a severe crash. The 51 year-old Unser suffered a broken right femur, right collarbone, and three upper right ribs. He quit the team after the crash.

Unser spent most of the month of May 1991 shopping around for a competitive ride. The restrictions on the number of leases to the Chevy Ilmor engine kept him out of a ride during the first week of practice. A last-minute deal with the UNO/Granatelli team (where he would be Arie Luyendyk's teammate) fell through when there was not enough time to prepare the car. Instead of jumping into another car "just to make the show," Unser sat out the 1991 race and watched from the sidelines for the first time since 1969.

In 1992, Unser entered the month of May for the second year in a row without a ride. During the first week of practice, Nelson Piquet was involved in a serious crash, and was unable to drive. Unser was hired by Team Menard to fill the position vacated by Piquet. Unser drove to a third place finish, while his son Al Unser Jr. won the race. It was Team Menard's best Indy 500 finish, the best finish for the Buick Indy engine, and the first time the Buick engine had gone the entire 500 miles (800 km). Later in the year, Unser was selected to drive as a substitute for the injured Rick Mears at Nazareth. It was Unser's first start for Penske since 1989, and his final start in a CART series event. He finished twelfth, earning one championship point.

In 1993, driving for King Racing, Unser led fifteen laps at the Indianapolis 500 to extend his career laps-led record. He finished twelfth, one lap down.

A month shy of his 55th birthday, Unser entered the 1994 race with Arizona Motorsports, hoping to qualify for what would be his 28th Indy 500. The team was very underfunded, and Unser had considerable trouble getting the car up to speed. On the first weekend of qualifying, he waved off after a poor qualifying lap. After some minimal practice the following day, he quit the team. He announced his retirement on May 17, 1994. His son Al Unser Jr. won the Indianapolis 500 on his father's 55th birthday.

=== Health and death ===
Unser suffered from hereditary haemochromatosis, which contributed to him being diagnosed with liver cancer in 2004 and having a tumor and half of his liver removed in 2005. Unser continued to suffer from cancer for the next 17 years before dying from the disease aged 82 on December 9, 2021, in his home in Chama, New Mexico.

== Career highlights ==
Unser has led the second most laps of any driver in the history of the Indianapolis 500, at 644. Unser tied Ralph DePalma's long standing record of 612 laps led on the last lap of his 4th victory.

Unser holds the record of being the oldest driver to ever win the 500 at 47 years old (1987), breaking the previous record set by his brother Bobby.

Unser won two 500-mile races at Pocono (in 1976 and 1978) and two more at Ontario (in 1977 and 1978) bringing his total of 500-mile race wins (including four Indianapolis 500s) to eight.

Showing his road-racing prowess in sports cars, Unser won a Can-Am race at Laguna Seca in 1980 and the 24 Hours of Daytona in 1985.

Unser was the 1978 IROC champion. He also competed in the 1968 Daytona 500 and four other NASCAR Winston Cup & Grand National races, all held on road courses with a best finish of fourth (twice).

== Awards ==
- Indianapolis Motor Speedway Hall of Fame (1986)
- Motorsports Hall of Fame of America (1991)
- International Motorsports Hall of Fame (1998)
- Pikes Peak Hill Climb Museum Hall of Fame (2020)

== Motorsports career results ==
The following race results have been compiled from Racing-Reference and ChampCarStats.

=== American open-wheel racing ===
(key) (Races in bold indicate pole position)

==== USAC Championship Car ====
USAC Championship Car results
Year	Team	Chassis	Engine	1	2	3	4	5	6	7	8	9	10	11	12	13	14	15	16	17	18	19	20	21	22	23	24	25	26	27	28	Pos.	Pts
1964	J. C. Agajanian	Troutman Barnes 64	Offy 252 ci	PHX	TRE	INDY	MIL	LAN	TRE	ISF	MIL; 23	DSF	INF	TRE	SAC	PHX																NC	0
1965	Arciero Racing	Weisman 64	Maserati 255 ci 4.2 V8	PHX; DNP	TRE																											19th	495
1965	Ansted-Thompson Racing	Lola T80	Ford 255 ci V8			INDY; 9																										19th	495
1965	J Frank Harrison	Eisert 65	Chevrolet 305 ci V8				MIL; 13	LAN; 12		TRE; 22	IRP; 12	ATL; 26	LAN; 16	MIL; 11	ISF	MIL; 7	DSF	INF; DNQ	TRE; 20		PHX; 17											19th	495
1965	J Frank Harrison	Eisert	Ford 289 ci						**PPR**; 1																							19th	495
1965	Roger Carsten	Kuzma 53 D	Offy 252 ci																	SAC; 11												19th	495
1966	J Frank Harrison	Eisert 65	Chevrolet 305 ci V8	PHX; 20	TRE																											5th	1260
1966	STP Corporation	Lotus 38	Ford 255 ci V8			INDY; 12																										5th	1260
1966	Mecom Racing Enterprises	Lola T90	Ford 255 ci V8				MIL; 6	LAN; 9	ATL; 16	PPR	IRP; 2	LAN; 3	ISF	MIL; 20	DSF	INF	TRE; 2		PHX; 2													5th	1260
1966	Joe Hunt	Lesovsky 58 D	Offy 252 ci															SAC; 18														5th	1260
1967	Mecom Racing Enterprises	Lola T90	Ford 255 ci V8	PHX; 23	TRE; 12																											5th	2505
1967	Mecom Racing Enterprises	Lola T92	Ford 255 ci V8			INDY; 2	MIL; 19	**LAN**; 2	PPR	MOS; 6	MOS; 5	IRP; 2	LAN; 22	MTR; 5	MTR; 5		MIL; 2			TRE; 11		HAN; 25	PHX; 2	RSD; 12								5th	2505
1967	Mecom Racing Enterprises	Dunlop 64 D	Offy 252 ci													ISF; 11		DSF; 9	INF; 3													5th	2505
1967	Mecom Racing Enterprises	Lesovsky D	Offy 252 ci																		SAC; 14											5th	2505
1968	Retzloff Racing Team	Lola T92	Ford 255 ci V8	HAN; 2					MIL; 3	MOS; 4	MOS; 5	LAN; 12		CDR; 4				LAN; 1	**LAN**; 1													3rd	2895
1968	Retzloff Racing Team	Lola T150	Ford 255 ci V8		LVS; 14	PHX; 16	TRE; 17									IRP; 1	**IRP**; 1			MTR; 9	MTR; 15		MIL; 3								RSD; 26	3rd	2895
1968	Retzloff Racing Team	Lola T150	Ford 159ci V8t					INDY; 26																		**TRE**; 22		MCH; 18	HAN; 15	PHX; 15		3rd	2895
1968	Al Unser	Chevrolet Special	Chevrolet										PPR; 22																			3rd	2895
1968	Retzloff Racing Team	Dunlop 64 D	Offy 252 ci												NAZ; 1							**ISF**; 12		**DSF**; 7	INF; 15		SAC; 3					3rd	2895
1969	Vel's Parnelli Jones Racing	Lola T150	Ford 159ci V8t	**PHX**; 22	HAN; 13							TRE; 25			MIL; 1		DOV; 12					TRE; 21				**PHX**; 1						2nd	2630
1969	Vel's Parnelli Jones Racing	Lotus 56	Ford 159ci V8t			INDY; Wth	MIL	LAN	PPR																							2nd	2630
1969	Vel's Parnelli Jones Racing	Lola T150	Ford 255 ci V8							CDR; 9	NAZ		IRP; 2	IRP; 19						**BRN**; 3	BRN; 9			SIR; 2	SIR; 1		RSD; 2					2nd	2630
1969	Vel's Parnelli Jones Racing	Kingfish 69 D	Ford 255 ci V8													ISF; 8		DSF; 1	INF; 4				SAC; 1									2nd	2630
1970	Vel's Parnelli Jones Racing	Colt-Lola T150	Ford 159ci V8t	PHX; 1		**TRE**; 3								**MIL**; 1					**TRE**; 1		**PHX**; 2											1st	5130
1970	Vel's Parnelli Jones Racing	Colt 70	Ford 255 ci V8		SON; 3																											1st	5130
1970	Vel's Parnelli Jones Racing	Colt 70	Ford 159ci V8t				**INDY**; 1	MIL; 3	LAN; 2		MCH; 18				ONT; 9																	1st	5130
1970	Vel's Parnelli Jones Racing	Colt-Lola T150	Ford 255 ci V8							**CDR**; 5		IRP; 1																				1st	5130
1970	Vel's Parnelli Jones Racing	Kingfish 69 D	Ford 255 ci V8										ISF; 1			**DSF**; 1	INF; 1	**SED**; 1		SAC; 1												1st	5130
1971	Vel's Parnelli Jones Racing	Colt 70	Ford 159ci V8t	RAF; 1	**RAF**; 1	PHX; 1	TRE; 21																									4th	2200
1971	Vel's Parnelli Jones Racing	Colt 71	Ford 159ci V8t					INDY; 1	MIL; 1	POC; 31	MCH; 24	MIL; 17																				4th	2200
1971	Vel's Parnelli Jones Racing	Colt 71	Offy 159 ci t										ONT; 15	TRE; 17	PHX; 21																	4th	2200
1972	Vel's Parnelli Jones Racing	Colt 71/72	Offy 159 ci t	PHX; 6																												4th	1800
1972	Vel's Parnelli Jones Racing	Parnelli VPJ-1	Offy 159 ci t		TRE; 20	INDY; 2	MIL; 20	MCH; 15	POC; 3	MIL; 15	ONT; 31	TRE; 23	PHX; 4																			4th	1800
1973	Vel's Parnelli Jones Racing	Parnelli VPJ-2	Offy 159 ci t	TWS; 1	TRE; 7	TRE; 3	INDY; 20	MIL; 9	POC; 33	MCH; 22	MIL; 26	ONT	ONT; 4	ONT; 9	MCH; 21	MCH	TRE; 25	TWS; 16	PHX; 19													13th	1080
1974	Vel's Parnelli Jones Racing	Eagle 73	Offy 159 ci t	ONT	ONT; 5	ONT; 2																										4th	2430
1974	Vel's Parnelli Jones Racing	Eagle 74	Offy 159 ci t				**PHX**; 18	TRE; 10	INDY; 18	MIL; 5	POC; 22	MCH; 2	MIL; 9	MCH; 1	TRE; 6	TRE; 5	PHX; 5															4th	2430
1975	Vel's Parnelli Jones Racing	Eagle 74	Offy 159 ci t	ONT; 7	ONT	ONT; 26	PHX	TRE	INDY; 16	MIL	POC; 32	MCH	MIL	MCH																		17th	450
1975	Sugaripe Prune Racing Team	Eagle 74	Offy 159 ci t												TRE; 4																	17th	450
1975	Vel's Parnelli Jones Racing	Parnelli VPJ-6B	Cosworth DFX V8t													PHX; 5																17th	450
1976	Vel's Parnelli Jones Racing	Parnelli VPJ-6B	Cosworth DFX V8t	**PHX**; 4	TRE	INDY; 7	MIL; 4	POC; 1	MCH; 10	TWS; 17	TRE; 2	MIL; 1	ONT; 32	MCH; 18	TWS; 3	PHX; 1																4th	3020
1977	Vel's Parnelli Jones Racing	Parnelli VPJ-6B	Cosworth DFX V8t	ONT; 2	PHX; 9	TWS; 2	TRE	INDY; 3	MIL; 3	POC; 25	**MOS**; 17	MCH; 16	TWS; 21	MIL; 15	ONT; 1	MCH; 4	PHX; 2															2nd	3030
1978	Chaparral Racing	Lola T500	Cosworth DFX V8t	PHX; 10	ONT; 3	TWS; Wth	TRE	INDY; 1	MOS; 12	MIL; 8	POC; 1	MCH; 17	ATL; 14	TWS; 17	MIL; 5	ONT; 1	MCH; 17	TRE; 4	SIL; 10	**BRH**; 15	PHX; 5											2nd	4031
1979	Chaparral Racing	Chaparral 2K	Cosworth DFX V8t	ONT	TWS	INDY; 22	MIL	POC	TWS	MIL																						NC	0
1980	Longhorn Racing	Longhorn LR01	Cosworth DFX V8t	ONT; 16	INDY; 27	MIL; 20	POC; 24	**MOH**; 13																								34th	49
1981-82	Longhorn Racing	Longhorn LR02	Cosworth DFX V8t	INDY; 17	POC	ISF	DSF	INF																								NC	0
1981-82	Longhorn Racing	Longhorn LR03	Cosworth DFX V8t						INDY; 5																							NC	0
1982-83	Penske Racing	Penske PC-11	Cosworth DFX V8t	ISF	DSF	NAZ	INDY; 2																									2nd	800
1983-84	Penske Racing	March 84C	Cosworth DFX V8t	DSF	INDY; 3																											3rd	700

==== PPG Indy Car World Series ====
CART results
Year	Team	Chassis	Engine	1	2	3	4	5	6	7	8	9	10	11	12	13	14	15	16	17	Rank	Points	Ref
1979	Chaparral Racing	Lola T500	Cosworth DFX V8t	PHX; 4	ATL; 6	ATL; 3							TRE; 6								5th	2085	
1979	Chaparral Racing	Chaparral 2K	Cosworth DFX V8t				INDY; 22	TRE; 2	TRE; 12	MCH; 13	MCH; 3	**WGL**; 5		ONT; 5	MCH; 10	ATL; 5	PHX; 1				5th	2085	
1980	Longhorn Racing	Longhorn LR01	Cosworth DFX V8t	ONT; 16	INDY; 27	MIL; 20	POC; 24	**MOH**; 13	MCH; 7	**WGL**; 19	MIL; 13	ONT; 4	MCH; 5	MEX; 3	PHX; 15						8th	1153	
1981	Longhorn Racing	Longhorn LR02	Cosworth DFX V8t	PHX; 17	MIL; 5	ATL; 6	ATL; 7	MCH; 11	RIV; 14	MIL; 5		WGL; 14	MEX; 2	PHX; 22							10th	90	
1981	Longhorn Racing	Eagle 81	Cosworth DFX V8t								MCH; 3										10th	90	
1982	Longhorn Racing	Longhorn LR03	Cosworth DFX V8t	PHX; 21	ATL; 8	MIL; 17	CLE; 3	MCH; 4	MIL; DNS												7th	125	
1982	Longhorn Racing	Longhorn LR03B	Cosworth DFX V8t							POC; 23	RIV; 17	ROA; 2	MCH; 18	PHX							7th	125	
1983	Penske Racing	Penske PC-11	Cosworth DFX V8t	ATL; 2	INDY; 2	MIL; 2	CLE; 1	MCH; 2	ROA; 3	POC; 11	RIV; 11										1st	151	
1983	Penske Racing	Penske PC-10B	Cosworth DFX V8t									MOH; 4	MCH; 5	CPL; 4	LAG; 11	PHX; 4					1st	151	
1984	Penske Racing	Penske PC-12	Cosworth DFX V8t	LBH; 22	PHX; 21																9th	76	
1984	Penske Racing	March 84C	Cosworth DFX V8t			INDY; 3	MIL; 5	POR; 27	MEA; 8	CLE; 10	MCH; 30	ROA; 3	POC; 8	MOH; 8	SAN; 13	MCH; 4	PHX; 17	LAG; 6	CPL; 14		9th	76	
1985	Penske Racing	March 85C	Cosworth DFX V8t	LBH; 5	INDY; 4	MIL	POR; 4	MEA; 3	CLE; 3	MCH; 2	ROA; 7	POC; 3	MOH; 27	SAN; 13	MCH; 12	LAG; 2	**PHX**; 1	MIA; 4			1st	151	
1986	Penske Racing	Penske PC-15	Chevrolet 265A V8t	PHX; 18	LBH	INDY; 22	MIL	POR	MEA	CLE	TOR										NC	0	
1986	Penske Racing	March 86C	Chevrolet 265A V8t									MCH; 14	POC; 20	MOH	SAN	MCH	ROA	LAG	PHX	MIA; 15	NC	0	
1987	Penske Racing	March 86C	Cosworth DFX V8t	LBH	PHX	INDY; 1	MIL	POR	MEA	CLE	TOR	MCH; 2	POC; 15	ROA	MOH						13th	39	
1987	Vince Granatelli Racing	March 87C	Cosworth DFX V8t													NAZ; 10					13th	39	
1987	Porsche Motorsports	Porsche 2708	Porsche V8t														LAG; 24				13th	39	
1987	Penske Racing	Penske PC-16	Chevrolet 265A V8t															MIA; DNQ			13th	39	
1988	Penske Racing	Penske PC-17	Chevrolet 265A V8t	PHX	LBH	INDY; 3	MIL	POR	CLE			MCH; 9	POC; 13	MOH	ROA	NAZ	LAG	MIA			19th	23	
1988	Vince Granatelli Racing	Lola T88/00	Cosworth DFX V8t							TOR; 9											19th	23	
1988	Vince Granatelli Racing	March 87C	Cosworth DFX V8t								MEA; 19										19th	23	
1989	Penske Racing	Penske PC-18	Chevrolet 265A V8t	PHX	LBH	INDY; 24	MIL	DET	POR	CLE; 10	MEA	TOR	MCH; 8	POC; 7	MOH	ROA	NAZ	LAG			16th	14	
1990	Patrick Racing	March 90CA	Alfa Romeo Indy V8t	PHX	LBH	INDY; 13	MIL	DET	POR	CLE	MEA	TOR									NC	0	
1990	Patrick Racing	Lola T90/00	Alfa Romeo Indy V8t										MCH; Wth	DEN	VAN	MOH	ROA	NAZ	LAG		NC	0	
1991	A. J. Foyt Enterprises	Lola T91/00	Chevrolet 265A V8t	SRF	LBH	PHX; 17	INDY	MIL	DET	POR	CLE	MEA	TOR	MCH	DEN	VAN	MOH	ROA	NAZ	LAG	NC	0	
1992	Team Menard	Lola T92/00	Buick 3300 V6t	SRF	PHX	LBH	INDY; 3	DET	POR	MIL	NHA	TOR	MCH	CLE	ROA	VAN	MOH				16th	15	
1992	Penske Racing	Penske PC-21	Chevrolet 265B V8t															NAZ; 12	LAG		16th	15	
1993	King Racing	Lola T93/00	Chevrolet 265C V8t	SRF	PHX	LBH	INDY; 12	MIL	DET	POR	CLE	TOR	MCH	NHA	ROA	VAN	MOH	NAZ	LAG		32nd	1	
1994	Arizona Motorsports	Lola T94/00	Ford XB V8t	SRF	PHX	LBH	INDY; Wth	MIL	DET	POR	CLE	TOR	MCH	MOH	NHA	VAN	ROA	NAZ	LAG		NA	-	

==== Indianapolis 500 ====
Year	Chassis	Engine	Start	Finish	Team
1965	Lola	Ford	32	9	Ansted-Thompson Racing
1966	Lotus	Ford	23	12	STP Corporation
1967	Lola	Ford	9	2	Mecom Racing Enterprises
1968	Lola	Ford	6	26	Retzloff Racing Team
1969	Lotus	Ford	Wth		Vel's Parnelli Jones Racing
1970	Colt	Ford	**1**	**1**	Vel's Parnelli Jones Racing
1971	Colt	Ford	5	**1**	Vel's Parnelli Jones Racing
1972	Parnelli	Offenhauser	19	2	Vel's Parnelli Jones Racing
1973	Parnelli	Offenhauser	8	20	Vel's Parnelli Jones Racing
1974	Eagle	Offenhauser	26	18	Vel's Parnelli Jones Racing
1975	Eagle	Offenhauser	11	16	Vel's Parnelli Jones Racing
1976	Parnelli	Cosworth	4	7	Vel's Parnelli Jones Racing
1977	Parnelli	Cosworth	3	3	Vel's Parnelli Jones Racing
1978	Lola	Cosworth	5	**1**	Chaparral Racing
1979	Chaparral	Cosworth	3	22	Chaparral Racing
1980	Longhorn	Cosworth	9	27	Longhorn Racing
1981	Longhorn	Cosworth	9	17	Longhorn Racing
1982	Longhorn	Cosworth	16	5	Longhorn Racing
1983	Penske	Cosworth	7	2	Penske Racing
1984	March	Cosworth	10	3	Penske Racing
1985	March	Cosworth	7	4	Penske Racing
1986	Penske	Chevrolet	5	22	Penske Racing
1987	March	Cosworth	20	**1**	Penske Racing
1988	Penske	Chevrolet	3	3	Penske Racing
1989	Penske	Chevrolet	2	24	Penske Racing
1990	March	Alfa Romeo	30	13	Patrick Racing
1992	Lola	Buick	22	3	Team Menard
1993	Lola	Chevrolet	23	12	King Racing
1994	Lola	Ford-Cosworth	DNQ / Wth		Arizona Motorsports

=== Non-Championship Formula One Results ===
(key)

Year	Entrant	Chassis	Engine	1	2	3	4	5	6	7	8
1971	Kastner Brophy Racing	Lola T192 F5000	Chevrolet 5.0 V8	ARG	ROC	QUE; 24	SPR	INT	RIN	OUL	VIC

=== NASCAR ===
(key) (Bold – Pole position awarded by qualifying time. Italics – Pole position earned by points standings or practice time. * – Most laps led.)

==== Grand National Series ====
NASCAR Grand National Series results
Year	Team	No.	Make	1	2	3	4	5	6	7	8	9	10	11	12	13	14	15	16	17	18	19	20	21	22	23	24	25	26	27	28	29	30	31	32	33	34	35	36	37	38	39	40	41	42	43	44	45	46	47	48	49	50	51	52	53	54	NGNC	Pts	Ref
1968	Rudy Hoerr	3	Dodge	MGR	MGY	RSD; 6																																																				NA	0	
1968	Owens Racing	6	Dodge				DAY; 4	BRI	RCH	ATL	HCY	GPS	CLB	NWS	MAR	AUG	AWS	DAR	BLV	LGY	CLT	ASH	MGR	SMR	BIR	CAR	GPS	DAY	ISP	OXF	FDA	TRN	BRI	SMR	NSV	ATL	CLB	BGS	AWS	SBO	LGY	DAR	HCY	RCH	BLV	HBO	MAR	NWS	AUG	CLT	CAR	JFC						NA	0	
1969	Rudy Hoerr	41	Dodge	MGR	MGY	RSD; 4	DAY	DAY	DAY	CAR	AUG	BRI	ATL	CLB	HCY	GPS	RCH	NWS	MAR	AWS	DAR	BLV	LGY	CLT	MGR	SMR	MCH	KPT	GPS	NCF	DAY	DOV	TPN	TRN	BLV	BRI	NSV	SMR	ATL	MCH	SBO	BGS	AWS	DAR	HCY	RCH	TAL	CLB	MAR	NWS	CLT	SVH	AUG	CAR	JFC	MGR	TWS	NA	0	

==== Winston Cup Series ====
NASCAR Winston Cup Series results
Year	Team	No.	Make	1	2	3	4	5	6	7	8	9	10	11	12	13	14	15	16	17	18	19	20	21	22	23	24	25	26	27	28	29	NWCC	Pts	Ref
1986	Baker-Schiff Racing	88	Olds	DAY	RCH	CAR	ATL	BRI	DAR	NWS	MAR	TAL	DOV	CLT	RSD	POC	MCH	DAY	POC	TAL	GLN; 29	MCH	BRI	DAR	RCH	DOV	MAR	NWS	CLT	CAR	ATL		106th	76	
1986	Dingman Brothers Racing	50	Pontiac																													RSD; 20	106th	76	

===== Daytona 500 =====
Year	Team	Manufacturer	Start	Finish
1968	Owens Racing	Dodge	8	4

=== International Race of Champions ===
(key) (Bold – Pole position. * – Most laps led.)

International Race of Champions results
Season	Make	Q1	Q2	Q3	1	2	3	4	Pos.	Pts	Ref
1975–76	Chevy				MCH; 8	RSD; 9	RSD; 2	DAY; 5	6th	-	
1976–77	Chevy				MCH; 5	RSD; 7	RSD; 5	DAY; 9	8th	-	
1977–78	Chevy				MCH; 1	RSD; 1*	RSD; 3	DAY; 7	1st	-	
1978–79	Chevy	MCH	**MCH**; 2	RSD	RSD; 11	ATL; 10			11th	-	
1986	Chevy				DAY; 1	MOH; 5	TAL; 6	GLN; 12*	4th	51	
1987	Chevy				DAY; 10	MOH; 10	**MCH**; 6	GLN; 7	11th	27	
1988	Chevy				DAY; 6	RSD; 6	MCH; 5	GLN; 5	8th	38	
1991	Dodge				DAY; 3	TAL; 6	MCH; 7	GLN; 9	6th	37	
1993	Dodge				DAY; 12	**DAR**; 9	TAL; 11	**MCH**; 11	12th	21	

=== 24 hours of Daytona ===
Year	Team	Manufacturer	Start	Finish
1985	Henn's Swap Shop Racing	Porsche 962	3	**1**
1987	A J Foyt Enterprises	Porsche 962	8	4
1991	Jochen Dauer Racing	Porsche 962	9	35

Sporting positions
Preceded by Mario Andretti	USAC National Championship Trail Champion; 1970	Succeeded by Joe Leonard
Preceded by Rick Mears	CART IndyCar Series Champion; 1983	Succeeded by Mario Andretti
Preceded by Mario Andretti	CART IndyCar Series Champion; 1985	Succeeded by Bobby Rahal
Preceded by A. J. Foyt	International Race of Champions champion IROC V (1978)	Succeeded by Mario Andretti
Achievements
Preceded by Mario Andretti	Indianapolis 500; Winner; 1970-1971	Succeeded by Mark Donohue
Preceded by A. J. Foyt	Indianapolis 500 winner 1978	Succeeded by Rick Mears
Preceded by Bobby Rahal	Indianapolis 500 winner 1987	Succeeded by Rick Mears
