= IROC VI =

Motor car races held in 1978–1979

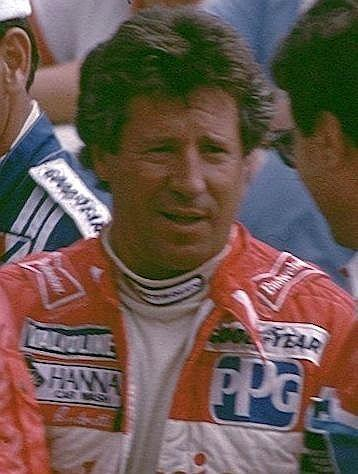
Mario Andretti won the IROC VI championship

IROC VI was the sixth year of IROC competition and took place in 1978 and 1979. The format changed from IROC V in that three qualifying races were held for participants from NASCAR, USAC Champ Car, and Road Racing (which primarily consisted of Formula One, SCCA, and IMSA). The top four finishers in these qualifying races then earned the chance to race in the two final races at Riverside International Raceway and Atlanta Motor Speedway. The Chevrolet Camaro was used in all races. Mario Andretti won the road racing finale en route to the championship and $75,000.

The final points standings were as follows:

Rank	Driver	Winnings	Series
1	(United States) Mario Andretti	$75,000	Formula One; USAC Champ Car; CART
2	(United States) Neil Bonnett	$28,500	NASCAR Winston Cup
3	(United States) Cale Yarborough	$28,500	NASCAR Winston Cup
4	(United States) Bobby Allison	$21,000	NASCAR Winston Cup
5	(Australia) Alan Jones	$20,000	Formula One
6	(United States) Gordon Johncock	$19,000	USAC Champ Car; CART
7	(United States) Tom Sneva	$18,000	USAC Champ Car; CART
8	(Brazil) Emerson Fittipaldi	$17,000	Formula One
9	(United States) Peter Gregg	$16,000	IMSA Camel GT
10	(United States) Donnie Allison	$15,000	NASCAR Winston Cup
11	(United States) Al Unser	$15,000	USAC Champ Car; CART
12	(United States) A. J. Foyt	$0	USAC Champ Car

== Race results ==
=== Qualifying Races ===
==== NASCAR Qualifying Race, Michigan International Speedway ====
1. Bobby Allison
2. Cale Yarborough
3. Donnie Allison
4. Neil Bonnett
5. David Pearson
6. Benny Parsons
7. Dave Marcis
8. Darrell Waltrip

==== USAC Champ Car Qualifying Race, Michigan International Speedway ====
1. A. J. Foyt
2. Al Unser
3. Gordon Johncock
4. Tom Sneva
5. Danny Ongais
6. Johnny Rutherford
7. Rick Mears
8. Bobby Unser

==== Road Racing Qualifying Race, Riverside International Raceway ====
1. Peter Gregg
2. Emerson Fittipaldi
3. Mario Andretti
4. Alan Jones
5. David Hobbs
6. Patrick Depailler
7. John Watson
8. Niki Lauda

=== Final Races ===
==== Road Racing Final, Riverside International Raceway ====
1. Mario Andretti
2. Cale Yarborough
3. Bobby Allison
4. Alan Jones
5. Emerson Fittipaldi
6. Gordon Johncock
7. Neil Bonnett
8. Tom Sneva
9. Peter Gregg
10. Donnie Allison
11. Al Unser
12. A. J. Foyt

==== Oval Final, Atlanta Motor Speedway ====
1. Neil Bonnett
2. Mario Andretti
3. Bobby Allison
4. Cale Yarborough
5. Tom Sneva
6. Gordon Johncock
7. Peter Gregg
8. Alan Jones
9. Emerson Fittipaldi
10. Al Unser
11. Donnie Allison
