= John Richards (racing driver) =

American racing driver

John Richards (born October 27, 1948) is a former American racing driver from Waco, Texas. A former motorcycle racer, Richards switched to racing cars and competed in the US Formula Super Vee championship in 1984 and finished 10th. In 1987, he funded a series of road course drives in the CART Championship Car series with Dick Simon Racing. He was knocked out by a practice crash in what was to have been his debut at Portland International Raceway, but competed at The Meadowlands, Cleveland, Toronto, and Laguna Seca Raceway and finished both the Cleveland and Laguna Seca races in the 13th position, one spot out of the points. He now lives in Seeley Lake, Montana.

== Racing record ==
=== Indy Car World Series ===
(key) (Races in bold indicate pole position; races in italics indicate fastest lap.)

Year	Team	1	2	3	4	5	6	7	8	9	10	11	12	13	14	15	Rank	Points	Ref
1987	Dick Simon Racing	LBH	PHX	INDY	MIL	POR; Wth	MEA; 26	CLE; 13	TOR; 14	MCH	POC	ROA	MDO	NAZ	LAG; 13	MIA	38th	0	
