= Unser Racing Museum =

Museum in Albuquerque, New Mexico

Coordinates: 35°08′29″N 106°39′45″W

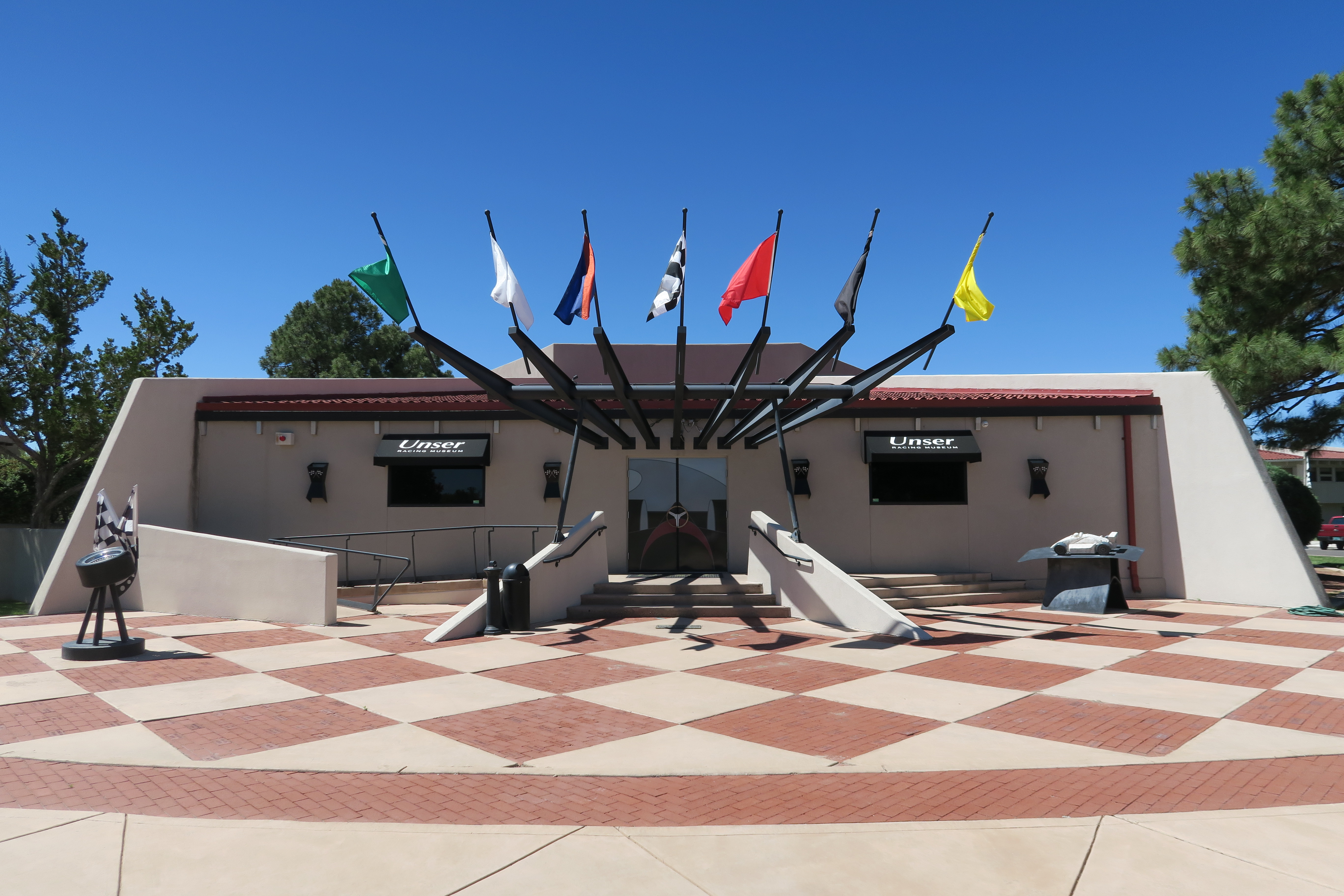
Unser Racing Museum

The Unser Racing Museum was a non-profit museum in Albuquerque, New Mexico, United States that celebrated the accomplishments of New Mexico's native auto racing family, the Unsers. The museum celebrates multiple generations of Unsers, from patriarch Jerry Unser, to Al Unser III and Mariana Unser as well.

Opened in 2005, the main building is shaped like a steering wheel. It featured multiple exhibits, and actual race cars driven by the Unsers. There was also a rotating exhibit, featuring a new racing aspect every few months.

The museum closed in May 2023 after a dispute over funding with the local government, with the collection moving to the larger Museum of American Speed in Nebraska.

== Sources ==
=== News ===
- Sanchez, Aurelio (September 16, 2005). "Revved and ready". Albuquerque Journal. p. 64 – via Newspapers.com.

=== Websites ===
- Wright, Rick (May 19, 2023). "Unser Museum leaving Albuquerque for much larger Museum of American Speed in Nebraska". Albuquerque Journal.
- Upchurch, Marilyn (May 29, 2023). "Unser Racing Museum officially closes its doors". KRQE.
