= IROC X =

Motor car races held in 1986

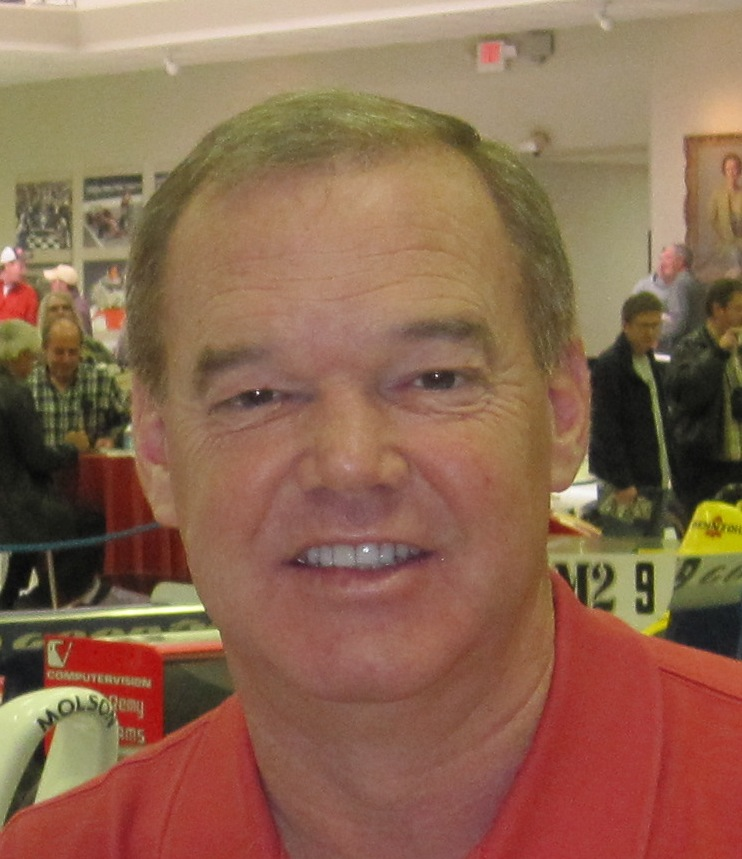
Al Unser Jr. (seen in 2011), the IROC X champion

IROC X was the tenth year of IROC competition, which took place in 1986. It saw the use of the Chevrolet Camaro in all races, it was the final season that television coverage was on CBS, and continued the format introduced in IROC VIII. Race one took place on the Daytona International Speedway, race two took place at Mid-Ohio, race three ran at Talladega Superspeedway, and race four concluded the year at Watkins Glen International. Al Unser Jr. won the championship and $164,100.

The roster of drivers and final points standings were as follows:

Rank	Driver	Points	Winnings	Series and reason for invite
1	(United States) Al Unser Jr.	62	$164,100	CART PPG IndyCar World Series; 2nd in 1985 IndyCar points
2	(United States) Bill Elliott	59	$82,100	NASCAR Winston Cup Series; 1985 Daytona 500, 1985 Winston 500, & 1985 Southern 500 winner 1985 Winston Million winner 2nd in 1985 Winston Cup points
3	(United States) Cale Yarborough	57	$60,900	NASCAR Winston Cup Series; IROC VIII Champion
4	(United States) Al Unser	51	$47,400	CART PPG IndyCar World Series; 1985 IndyCar Champion; IROC V Champion
5	(United States) Darrell Waltrip	48	$39,000	NASCAR Winston Cup Series; 1985 Winston Cup Champion
6	(United States) Harry Gant	42	$36,000	NASCAR Winston Cup Series; Defending IROC Champion
7	(United States) Bobby Rahal	37	$29,000	CART PPG IndyCar World Series; 3rd in 1985 IndyCar points
8	(West Germany) Klaus Ludwig ^{1}	29	$25,000	IMSA Camel GTP; 1985 24 Hours of Le Mans Winner
9	(West Germany) Hans-Joachim Stuck ^{1}	29	$24,000	World Sports-Prototype Championship; 1985 World Sportscar Co-Champion
10	(United States) Hurley Haywood ^{2}	28	$23,000	IMSA Camel GTP; 3rd in 1985 IMSA Camel GTP points
11	(West Germany) Jochen Mass ^{2}	28	$22,000	World Sports-Prototype Championship; 3rd in 1985 World Sportscar Championship
12	(United States) Rick Mears	25	$20,800	CART PPG IndyCar World Series; 10th in 1985 IndyCar points

== Race results ==
=== Race One, Daytona International Speedway ===
Friday, February 14, 1986

Finish	Grid	Car no.	Driver	Car Make	Car Color	Laps	Status	Laps Led	Points
1	4	18	(United States) Al Unser	Chevrolet Camaro	Light Blue	40	0:33:04	10	26 (5)
2	8	2	(United States) Cale Yarborough	Chevrolet Camaro	Dark Blue	40	Flagged		17
3	12	17	(United States) Bill Elliott	Chevrolet Camaro	Silver	40	Flagged		14
4	2	10	(United States) Hurley Haywood	Chevrolet Camaro	Red	40	Flagged		12
5	5	22	(West Germany) Klaus Ludwig	Chevrolet Camaro	Black	40	Flagged		10
6	7	8	(West Germany) Hans-Joachim Stuck	Chevrolet Camaro	Orange	39	Flagged		9
7	11	19	(United States) Darrell Waltrip	Chevrolet Camaro	Dark Red	39	Flagged		8
8	1	17	(United States) Harry Gant	Chevrolet Camaro	Medium Blue	32	Fuel Pressure	30	12 (3)
9	6	1	(United States) Rick Mears	Chevrolet Camaro	White	25	Crash		6
10	10	3	(West Germany) Jochen Mass	Chevrolet Camaro	Pink	4	Crash		5
11	3	6	(United States) Al Unser Jr.	Chevrolet Camaro	Yellow	4	Crash		4
12	9	5	(United States) Bobby Rahal	Chevrolet Camaro	Powder Blue	4	Crash		3

(5) Indicates 5 bonus points added to normal race points scored for leading the most laps.
(3) Indicates 3 bonus points added to normal race points scored for leading the 2nd most laps
(2) Indicates 2 bonus points added to normal race points scored for leading the 3rd most laps (did not occur in this race so not awarded).

Average speed: 181.452 mph (292.019 km/h)
Cautions: 2
Margin of victory: 40 feet
Lead changes: 1

Lap Leader Breakdown

Driver	From Lap	To Lap	Number of Laps
Harry Gant	1	30	30
Al Unser	31	40	10

=== Race Two, Mid-Ohio Sports Car Course ===
Saturday, June 7, 1986

Finish	Grid	Car no.	Driver	Car Make	Car Color	Laps	Status	Laps Led	Points
1	2	10	(United States) Al Unser Jr.	Chevrolet Camaro	Red	29	0:49:53	29	26 (5)
2	1	8	(United States) Bobby Rahal	Chevrolet Camaro	Orange	29	Flagged		17
3	6	1	(United States) Darrell Waltrip	Chevrolet Camaro	White	29	Flagged		14
4	10	7	(United States) Bill Elliott	Chevrolet Camaro	Medium Blue	29	Flagged		12
5	12	2	(United States) Al Unser	Chevrolet Camaro	Dark Blue	29	Flagged		10
6	5	6	(United States) Harry Gant	Chevrolet Camaro	Yellow	29	Flagged		9
7	3	20	(West Germany) Jochen Mass	Chevrolet Camaro	Purple	29	Flagged		8
8	7	17	(West Germany) Hans-Joachim Stuck	Chevrolet Camaro	Silver	29	Flagged		7
9	8	18	(West Germany) Klaus Ludwig	Chevrolet Camaro	Light Blue	29	Flagged		6
10	11	12	(United States) Cale Yarborough	Chevrolet Camaro	Dark Red	29	Flagged		5
11	9	5	(United States) Hurley Haywood	Chevrolet Camaro	Powder Blue	29	Flagged		4
12	4	22	(United States) Rick Mears	Chevrolet Camaro	Black	29	Flagged		3

(5) Indicates 5 bonus points added to normal race points scored for leading the most laps.
(3) Indicates 3 bonus points added to normal race points scored for leading the 2nd most laps (Did not occur in this race so not awarded).
(2) Indicates 2 bonus points added to normal race points scored for leading the 3rd most laps (Did not occur in this race so not awarded).

Average speed: 80.823 mph (130.072 km/h)
Cautions: none
Margin of victory: 2.87 sec
Lead changes: 0

=== Race Three, Talladega Superspeedway ===
Saturday, July 26, 1986

Finish	Grid	Car no.	Driver	Car Make	Car Color	Laps	Status	Laps Led	Points
1	7	8	(United States) Cale Yarborough	Chevrolet Camaro	Orange	38	0:33:04	30	26 (5)
2	6	2	(United States) Harry Gant	Chevrolet Camaro	Dark Blue	38	Flagged		17
3	9	18	(United States) Bill Elliott	Chevrolet Camaro	Light Blue	38	Flagged		14
4	8	20	(United States) Darrell Waltrip	Chevrolet Camaro	Purple	38	Flagged		12
5	2	22	(West Germany) Jochen Mass	Chevrolet Camaro	Black	38	Flagged		10
6	11	10	(United States) Al Unser	Chevrolet Camaro	Red	38	Flagged		9
7	10	1	(United States) Al Unser Jr.	Chevrolet Camaro	White	38	Flagged		8
8	1	7	(United States) Rick Mears	Chevrolet Camaro	Blue	38	Flagged	8	10 (3)
9	4	6	(West Germany) Hans-Joachim Stuck	Chevrolet Camaro	Yellow	38	Flagged		6
10	5	17	(United States) Bobby Rahal	Chevrolet Camaro	Silver	38	Flagged		5
11	3	12	(United States) Hurley Haywood	Chevrolet Camaro	Dark Red	38	Flagged		4
12	12	5	(West Germany) Klaus Ludwig	Chevrolet Camaro	Powder Blue	38	Flagged		3

(5) Indicates 5 bonus points added to normal race points scored for leading the most laps.
(3) Indicates 3 bonus points added to normal race points scored for leading the 2nd most laps
(2) Indicates 2 bonus points added to normal race points scored for leading the 3rd most laps (Did not occur in this race so not awarded).

Average speed: 183.411 mph (295.171 km/h)
Cautions: none
Margin of victory: 1 cl
Lead changes: 1

Lap Leader Breakdown

Driver	From Lap	To Lap	Number of Laps
Rick Mears	1	8	8
Cale Yarborough	9	38	30

=== Race Four, Watkins Glen International ===
Saturday, August 9, 1986

Finish	Grid	Car no.	Driver	Car Make	Car Color	Laps	Status	Laps Led	Points
1	5	6	(United States) Al Unser Jr.	Chevrolet Camaro	Yellow	30	0:40:05	14	24 (3)
2	3	1	(United States) Bill Elliott	Chevrolet Camaro	White	30	Flagged	1	19 (2)
3	6	17	(United States) Darrell Waltrip	Chevrolet Camaro	Silver	30	Flagged		14
4	7	2	(United States) Bobby Rahal	Chevrolet Camaro	Dark Blue	30	Flagged		12
5	12	7	(West Germany) Klaus Ludwig	Chevrolet Camaro	Medium Blue	30	Flagged		10
6	1	18	(United States) Cale Yarborough	Chevrolet Camaro	Light Blue	30	Flagged		9
7	10	20	(United States) Hurley Haywood	Chevrolet Camaro	Purple	30	Flagged		8
8	9	8	(West Germany) Hans-Joachim Stuck	Chevrolet Camaro	Orange	30	Flagged		7
9	11	10	(United States) Rick Mears	Chevrolet Camaro	Red	30	Flagged		6
10	8	4	(West Germany) Jochen Mass	Chevrolet Camaro	Mauve	29	Flagged		5
11	4	5	(United States) Harry Gant	Chevrolet Camaro	Powder Blue	29	Flagged		4
12	2	11	(United States) Al Unser	Chevrolet Camaro	Dark Red	18	Crash	15	8 (5)

(5) Indicates 5 bonus points added to normal race points scored for leading the most laps.
(3) Indicates 3 bonus points added to normal race points scored for leading the 2nd most laps
(2) Indicates 2 bonus points added to normal race points scored for leading the 3rd most laps.

Average speed: 109.078 mph (175.544 km/h)
Cautions: none
Margin of victory: 3 cl
Lead changes: 3

Lap Leader Breakdown

Driver	From Lap	To Lap	Number of Laps
Al Unser	1	15	15
Bill Elliott	16	16	1
Al Unser Jr	17	30	14

== Notes ==
1. Klaus Ludwig and Hans Stuck tied for eighth place in the championship standings, but Ludwig was awarded the position due to a higher finishing position in the final race. Klaus Ludwig was scheduled to start fourth in the final race, but was moved to the back of the grid for not practicing.
1. Hurley Haywood and Jochen Mass tied for tenth place, but Haywood was awarded the position due a higher finish in the final race.
