= 1987 CART PPG Indy Car World Series =

American motorsport season

1987 CART season
- PPG Indy Car World Series

Season
- Races: 16
- Start date: April 4
- End date: November 1

Awards
- Drivers' champion: (United States) Bobby Rahal
- Constructors' Cup: (United Kingdom) March 87C (United Kingdom) March 86C
- Manufacturers' Cup: (United Kingdom) Cosworth DFX
- Nations' Cup: United States
- Rookie of the Year: (Italy) Fabrizio Barbazza
- Indianapolis 500 winner: (United States) Al Unser

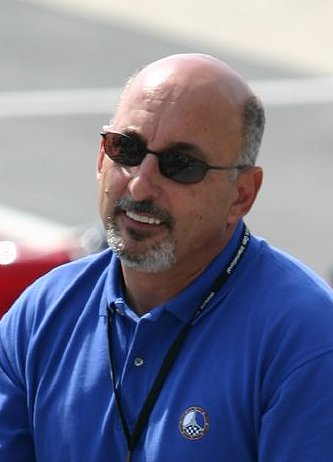
Defending champion Bobby Rahal

The 1987 CART PPG Indy Car World Series season was the 9th national championship season of American open wheel racing sanctioned by CART. The season consisted of 16 races, and one non-points exhibition event. Bobby Rahal was the national champion, winning his second-consecutive title. The rookie of the year was Fabrizio Barbazza. The 1987 Indianapolis 500 was sanctioned by USAC, but counted towards the CART points championship. Al Unser won the Indy 500, his record-tying fourth victory at Indy.

Defending series champion and defending Indy 500 winner Bobby Rahal and his Truesports team made a highly publicized switch from the March chassis to the up-and-coming Lola chassis. Truesports, however, stayed with the proven Cosworth engine. For 1987, the Ilmor Chevrolet Indy V-8 expanded its participation, fielding cars with Penske Racing, Newman/Haas and Patrick. Mario Andretti scored the engine's first Indy car victory in the season opener at Long Beach. Also joining the series full-time was the Judd AV V-8 (badged initially as the Brabham-Honda), and later in the season Porsche made their Indy car debut. Penske resumed their in-house chassis program, but after dismal results with the PC-16, the cars were parked during practice at Indy in favor of the March 86C.

Roberto Guerrero won the second race of the season (Phoenix), starting from last position on the grid due to failing post qualifying inspection. Mario Andretti dominated the Indianapolis 500, leading 171 of the first 177 laps, but dropped out with engine failure with only 23 laps to go. Guerrero took the lead, but stalled during his final pit stop. Al Unser led the final 18 laps to win, one of the biggest upsets in Indy 500 history. Though Guerrero faltered at Indy, he would be a factor through most of the season. After winning at Mid-Ohio in September he was third in points. However he was sidelined with serious head injuries due to a testing crash at the Indianapolis Motor Speedway and was in a coma for seventeen days, missing the remainder of the season.

For the second year in a row, the championship battle came down to Bobby Rahal and Michael Andretti. Rahal took the points lead after back-to-back wins at Portland and the Meadowlands. Andretti won the Michigan 500, and drew within 9 points of Rahal. At Mid-Ohio, Rahal was dominating until he tangled with a backmarker. Andretti had a chance to make up ground in the points, but blew his engine two laps later.

Michael Andretti rebounded, winning in dominating fashion at the inaugural race at Nazareth. But Rahal charged to finish second, and with two races left, held a 25-point lead. In the next-to-last race of the season at Laguna Seca, Andretti dropped out with alternator trouble, and Rahal mathematically clinched the championship. It was Rahal's second-consecutive CART title, and Michael Andretti finished runner-up in points for the second year in a row.

== Teams and drivers ==
The following teams and drivers competed in the 1987 Indy Car World Series season. All cars used Goodyear tires.

Team	Chassis	Engine	No.	Driver(s)	Rounds	Notes
A. J. Foyt Enterprises	Lola T8700	Cosworth DFX	14	(United States) A. J. Foyt	3-4, 9-10, 13, 15	
A. J. Foyt Enterprises	March 86C	Cosworth DFX	41	(United States) Stan Fox	3	
A. J. Foyt Enterprises	March 86C	Cosworth DFX	41	(United States) Davy Jones R	9, 13, 15	
A. J. Foyt Enterprises	March 86C	Cosworth DFX	44	(United States) Davy Jones R	3	
A. J. Foyt Enterprises	March 86C	Chevy V-6	84	(United States) George Snider	3	
Alex Morales Motorsports	March 87C	Cosworth DFX	21	(United States) Johnny Rutherford	All	
American Racing	March 86C	Buick V-6	2	(United Kingdom) Jim Crawford	3	^{1}
American Racing	March 86C	Buick V-6	2	(United States) Gordon Johncock	3	^{1}
Arciero Racing	March 87C	Cosworth DFX	12	(Italy) Fabrizio Barbazza R	1-13, 15	^{2}
Arciero Racing	March 87C	Cosworth DFX	12	(Canada) Ludwig Heimrath Jr. R	14-15	^{2}
Arciero Racing	March 85C	Cosworth DFX	12	(Canada) Ludwig Heimrath Jr. R	14-15	^{2}
Arciero Racing	March 85C	Cosworth DFX	12	(New Zealand) Graham McRae	15	^{2}
Bettenhausen Motorsports	March 86C	Cosworth DFX	16	(United States) Tony Bettenhausen Jr.	1-5, 7-12	
Centerline Wheels	March	Pontiac	59	(United States) Sammy Swindell	3	
Curb	March 87C; March 86C	Cosworth DFX	33	(United States) Tom Sneva	1-9	^{3}
Curb	March 87C; March 86C	Cosworth DFX	33	(United States) John Andretti R	11-15	^{3}
Curb	March 87C; March 86C	Cosworth DFX	98	(United States) Ed Pimm	3, 9	^{3}
Dale Coyne Racing	March 86C	Chevy; Cosworth DFX	19	(United States) Dale Coyne	1-2, 4-15	^{4}
Dick Simon Racing	Lola T8700	Cosworth DFX	22	(United States) Dick Simon	1-10, 13	
Dick Simon Racing	Lola T8700	Cosworth DFX	22	(United States) Wally Dallenbach Jr. R	11	
Dick Simon Racing	Lola T8700	Cosworth DFX	22	(Canada) Ludwig Heimrath Jr. R	12	
Dick Simon Racing	Lola T8700	Cosworth DFX	22	(United States) John Richards R	14	
Dick Simon Racing	Lola T8700	Cosworth DFX	22	(United States) Jeff Wood R	15	
Dick Simon Racing	Lola T8700	Cosworth DFX	23	(Canada) Ludwig Heimrath Jr. R	1-10	
Dick Simon Racing	Lola T8700	Cosworth DFX	23	(United States) Jeff Wood R	11-14	
Dick Simon Racing	Lola T8700	Cosworth DFX	23	(Italy) Fulvio Ballabio R	15	
Dick Simon Racing	Lola T8600; Lola T8700	Cosworth DFX	27	(United States) John Richards R	5-8	^{5}
Dick Simon Racing	Lola T8600	Cosworth DFX	27	(United Kingdom) Ian Ashley	15	
Doug Shierson Racing	March 87C	Cosworth DFX	30	(United States) Al Unser Jr.	All	
Galles Racing	March 87C; Lola T8700	Judd; Cosworth DFX	11	(United States) Jeff MacPherson	All	^{6}
Galles Racing	March 87C	Judd	15	(Australia) Geoff Brabham	All	
Gohr Racing	March 86C	Cosworth DFX	56	(United States) Rocky Moran	1	
Gohr Racing	March 86C	Cosworth DFX	56	(United States) Gary Bettenhausen	2-4, 9-10	
Gohr Racing	March 87C; March 86C	Cosworth DFX	56	(Canada) Scott Goodyear R	6-8, 11-12, 14-15	^{7}
Granatelli Racing	March 87C	Cosworth DFX	4	(Colombia) Roberto Guerrero	1-12	
Granatelli Racing	March 87C	Cosworth DFX	4	(United States) Al Unser	13	
Granatelli Racing	March 87C	Cosworth DFX	4	(Brazil) Raul Boesel	14-15	
Hemelgarn Racing	March 87C	Cosworth DFX	71	(Netherlands) Arie Luyendyk	All	
Hemelgarn Racing	March 87C	Buick V-6	81	(United States) Rich Vogler	3	
Hemelgarn Racing	March 87C	Cosworth DFX	91	(United States) Scott Brayton	3, 5-6, 9-10	
Hemelgarn Racing	March 86C	Buick V-6	91	(United States) Johnny Parsons	3	
Interscope Racing	Penske PC-16; March 86C	Chevy 265A; Cosworth DFX	25	(United States) Danny Ongais	3, 9, 13, 15	^{8}
Intersport	March 86C	Cosworth DFX	17	(United States) Dominic Dobson	3	
JP Racing	March 86C	Cosworth DFX	35	(United States) Spike Gehlhausen	3	
Kraco Racing	March 87C	Cosworth DFX	18	(United States) Michael Andretti	All	
Leader Cards Racing	March 87C	Cosworth DFX	24	(United States) Randy Lewis	All	
Los Angeles Drywall	March 85C	Cosworth DFX	19	(United States) Dick Ferguson	3	
Los Angeles Drywall	March 85C	Cosworth DFX	27	(United States) Dick Ferguson	9	
Machinists Union Racing	March 87C	Cosworth DFX	29	(United States) Pancho Carter	3, 9-15	
Machinists Union Racing	March 86C	Cosworth DFX	44	(United States) Chip Robinson	1, 6, 13	
Machinists Union Racing	March 86C	Cosworth DFX	44	(United States) Tom Sneva	15	
Machinists Union Racing	March 87C	Cosworth DFX	55	(Mexico) Josele Garza	All	
Machinists Union Racing	March 86C	Cosworth DFX	59	(United States) Mike Nish	1-2	
Machinists Union Racing	March 86C; March 87C	Cosworth DFX	59	(United States) Rick Miaskiewicz	5, 7-8, 12	^{9}
Newman Teamworks	Lola T8600	Cosworth DFX	51	(Belgium) Didier Theys R	1, 11	
Newman Teamworks	Lola T8600	Cosworth DFX	51	(United States) Davy Jones R	12	
Newman/Haas Racing	Lola T8700	Chevy 265A	5	(United States) Mario Andretti	All	
NFW Racing	March 86C	Cosworth DFX	36	(New Zealand) Graham McRae	11-12	
Pace Racing	March 87C	Buick V-6	77	(Republic of Ireland) Derek Daly	3	
Patrick Racing	March 87C	Chevy 265A	7	(United States) Kevin Cogan	1-4, 6-15	
Patrick Racing	March 87C	Chevy 265A	20	(Brazil) Emerson Fittipaldi	All	
Penske Racing	Penske PC-16; March 86C	Chevy 265A	3	(United States) Danny Sullivan	All	^{10}
Penske Racing	Penske PC-16; March 86C	Chevy 265A	8	(United States) Rick Mears	All	^{11}
Penske Racing	March 86C	Cosworth DFX	6	(United States) Al Unser	9-10	
Penske Racing	Penske PC-16	Chevy 265A	9	(United States) Al Unser	15	
Penske Racing	March 86C	Cosworth DFX	25	(United States) Al Unser	3	
Porsche	Porsche 2708	Porsche	6	(United States) Al Unser	14	
Porsche	Porsche 2708	Porsche	6	(United States) Al Holbert	15	
Raynor	Lola T8700	Cosworth DFX	10	(United States) Dennis Firestone	1-3	
Raynor	Lola T8600	Cosworth DFX	10	(United States) Phil Krueger	3	
Raynor	Lola T8700	Cosworth DFX	10	(Republic of Ireland) Derek Daly	4-15	
Truesports	Lola T8700	Cosworth DFX	1	(United States) Bobby Rahal	All	
Truesports	Lola T8700	Cosworth DFX	2	(Belgium) Didier Theys R	15	
United Oil	March 87C	Cosworth DFX	87	(United States) Steve Chassey	3	
Walther	March 86C	Cosworth DFX	76	(United States) Rocky Moran	3	
WENS	March 86C	Cosworth DFX	97	(United States) Rick Miaskiewicz	3	

Notes

(R) – Rookie

1. Crawford was injured on Pole Day, and replaced by Johncock.
2. All three drivers listed as entries at Miami.
3. Curb used March 86C Chassis at round 3 only.
4. Coyne used a Cosworth engine at round 7 only.
5. Richards used a Lola T8700 at round 6 only.
6. MacPherson used a Lola T8600 at rounds 11 and 12 only, and used Cosworth at rounds 10, 13-15 only.
7. Goodyear used a March 86C at round 7 only.
8. Ongais practiced at round 3 with a PC-16/Chevy A combo, but did not attempt to qualify due to injury.
9. Miaskiewicz used a March 87C at round 7 only.
10. Sullivan used a PC-16 at rounds 1-2, 5-6 only while he used a March 86C at the other rounds.
11. Mears used a PC-16 at rounds 1-2, 5-8 only while he used a March 86C at the other rounds.

== Schedule ==
There would only be one race at Phoenix International Raceway and Michigan International Speedway from this season forward. Additionally Pennsylvania International Raceway had been paved and added to the schedule as a 200 mile event for the first time.

Icon	Legend
O	Oval/Speedway
R	Road course
S	Street circuit
NC	Non-championship race

Rd	Date	Race name	Track	City
1	April 5	Toyota Grand Prix of Long Beach	S Long Beach Street Circuit	Long Beach, California
2	April 12	Checker 200	O Phoenix International Raceway	Avondale, Arizona
3	May 24	Indianapolis 500*	O Indianapolis Motor Speedway	Speedway, Indiana
4	May 31	Miller American 200	O Milwaukee Mile	West Allis, Wisconsin
5	June 14	Budweiser/G. I. Joe's 200	R Portland International Raceway	Portland, Oregon
6	June 28	Meadowlands Indy	S Meadowlands Street Circuit	East Rutherford, New Jersey
7	July 5	Budweiser Cleveland Grand Prix	S Burke Lakefront Airport	Cleveland, Ohio
8	July 19	Molson Indy Toronto	S Exhibition Place	Toronto, Ontario
9	August 2	Marlboro 500	O Michigan International Speedway	Brooklyn, Michigan
10	August 16	Quaker State 500	O Pocono International Raceway	Long Pond, Pennsylvania
11	August 30	LivingWell/Provimi 200	R Road America	Elkhart Lake, Wisconsin
12	September 6	Escort Radar Warning 200	R Mid-Ohio Sports Car Course	Lexington, Ohio
13	September 20	Bosch Spark Plug Grand Prix	O Pennsylvania International Raceway	Lehigh Valley, Pennsylvania
14	October 11	Nissan Monterey Grand Prix	R Laguna Seca Raceway	Monterey, California
NC	October 31	Marlboro Challenge	S Tamiami Park	Miami, Florida
15	November 1	Nissan Indy Challenge**	S Tamiami Park	Miami, Florida

* Indianapolis was USAC-sanctioned but counted towards the CART title.

** Miami was supposed to run for 200 miles (322 kilometers) but was shortened due to rain.

== Results ==
Rd	Name	Pole position	Fastest lap	Winning driver	Winning team	Race time	Report
1	Grand Prix of Long Beach	(United States) Mario Andretti	1:05.886	(United States) Mario Andretti	Newman/Haas Racing	1:51:33	Report
2	Checker 200	(United States) Mario Andretti	21.832	(Colombia) Roberto Guerrero	Vince Granatelli Racing	1:26:26	Report
3	Indianapolis 500	(United States) Mario Andretti	2:47.139	(United States) Al Unser	Penske Racing	3:04:59	Report
4	Miller American 200	(Colombia) Roberto Guerrero	23.544	(United States) Michael Andretti	Kraco Racing	1:47:17	Report
5	Budweiser/G. I. Joe's 200	(Colombia) Roberto Guerrero	59.207	(United States) Bobby Rahal	Truesports	1:50:02	Report
6	Meadowlands Grand Prix	(United States) Mario Andretti	1:01.097	(United States) Bobby Rahal	Truesports	1:57:18	Report
7	Cleveland Grand Prix	(Colombia) Roberto Guerrero	1:05.509	(Brazil) Emerson Fittipaldi	Patrick Racing	1:32:40	Report
8	Molson Indy Toronto	(United States) Bobby Rahal		(Brazil) Emerson Fittipaldi	Patrick Racing	1:54:35	Report
9	Marlboro 500	(United States) Michael Andretti	33.406	(United States) Michael Andretti	Kraco Racing	2:54:56	Report
10	Quaker State 500	(United States) Mario Andretti	44.795	(United States) Rick Mears	Penske Racing	3:11:50	Report
11	Provimi Veal 200	(United States) Mario Andretti	1:52.687	(United States) Mario Andretti	Newman/Haas Racing	1:39:52	Report
12	Escort Radar Warning 200	(Colombia) Roberto Guerrero	1:15.585	(Colombia) Roberto Guerrero	Vince Granatelli Racing	1:51:58	Report
13	Bosch Spark Plug Grand Prix	(United States) Michael Andretti	21.926	(United States) Michael Andretti	Kraco Racing	1:33:02	Report
14	Champion Spark Plug 300k	(United States) Mario Andretti	52.926	(United States) Bobby Rahal	Truesports	1:33:58	Report
NC	Marlboro Challenge	(Brazil) Raul Boesel		(United States) Bobby Rahal	Truesports	0:41:20	Report
15	Miami Indy Challenge	(United States) Mario Andretti	1:54.630	(United States) Michael Andretti	Kraco Racing	1:56:12	Report

=== Race summaries ===
==== Long Beach ====
Mario Andretti started on the pole position and dominated the Long Beach Grand Prix, his third win in four years at the circuit. It marked the first-ever victory in Indy car competition for the Ilmor Chevrolet Indy V-8 engine. Emerson Fittipaldi was a close second until he dropped out with turbocharger failure.

==== Phoenix ====
Roberto Guerrero qualified third, but failed post-qualifying inspection for being 2.5 pounds underweight. He was forced to start last on the grid. Guerrero quickly charged through the field, and was in the top five by lap 46. He dueled with Bobby Rahal for the lead on lap 62, and dominated the second half. Even a stop-and-go penalty for hitting a tire in the pits did not slow Guerrero's run.

Guerrero won by 8 seconds over Rahal, becoming only the fourth driver in modern Indy car history to win a race from the last starting position.

==== Indianapolis 500 ====
Mario Andretti dominated the entire month of May at Indy. He ran the fastest practice laps, won the pole position, the pit stop contest, and led 170 of the first 177 laps. With only 23 laps to go, Andretti suddenly slowed with a broken valve spring which led to fueling and engine failure. Roberto Guerrero, the winner at Phoenix, stalled in the pits while leading due to a failing clutch, and came home second while Al Unser, who had entered the month without a ride took the lead with 18 laps to go, and recorded one of the biggest upsets in Indy history.

==== Milwaukee ====
While leading the race on lap 149, Mario Andretti broke a rear wing, sending the car hard into the outside and inside walls. He was taken to the hospital with relatively minor injuries. Mario's son Michael Andretti took the lead after the accident, locked in a duel with Roberto Guerrero.

On lap 177, Guerrero suddenly blew his engine, leaving Michael Andretti in the lead. A late-race caution allowed Bobby Rahal to close the gap, but Michael held on for the victory. Rahal finished second.

==== Portland ====
Bobby Rahal won his first race of the season, passing Michael Andretti for the lead on lap 70 of 104. Rahal built up a 22-second lead late in the race, but slowed to conserve fuel over the final 10 laps. Andretti closed to within 6 seconds, but managed only second place.

==== Meadowlands ====
Bobby Rahal made it back-to-back victories, winning for the second time of the season at the Meadowlands. Rahal also took over the points lead.

==== Cleveland ====
Emerson Fittipaldi and Bobby Rahal pitted for the final time on lap 53, both hoping to stretch their fuel to the finish. Fittipaldi pulled out to an 18-second lead, and despite the fuel light flashing over the final five laps, held on to win his first race of the season.

Rahal finished a strong second, and increased his lead in the points standings.

==== Toronto ====
Emerson Fittipaldi looked to win his second race in a row, but a final lap mishap almost cost him the race. With Danny Sullivan running second on the final lap, Fittipaldi led by about 4 seconds at the white flag. Down the Lake Shore Drive backstretch on the final lap, however, Fittipaldi became mired in traffic. Through the hairpin, the track was essentially blocked by three backmarkers, which allowed Sullivan to dramatically close the gap. With two turns to go, Sullivan dove below Fittipaldi for the lead, but the two cars touched wheels. Fittipaldi's car stayed straight, but Sullivan spun out.

Fittipaldi went on to win, while Sullivan limped across the finish line to hold on to second. Bobby Rahal came home third and padded his championship lead.

==== Michigan 500 ====
Just as at Indianapolis, Mario Andretti dominated the race. Taking the lead on lap 43, he led the next 114 laps and had a 1 lap lead on his son Michael, in second place, and a 2 lap lead on the rest of the field. But, just as at Indianapolis, his engine blew on lap 156, ending his day.

With 8 laps to go, Michael Andretti led Indy 500 winner Al Unser and Bobby Rahal. Andretti needed to make his final pit stop, but a faulty clutch nearly cost him dearly. Andretti's car sputtered and nearly stalled as he pulled away, and he lost several seconds.

Back on the track, Michael maintained a 9-second lead to the finish, with Unser finishing second. Third place Rahal maintained a 9-point advantage over Michael in the points championship.

==== Pocono 500 ====
Mario Andretti started from the pole and led 22 laps, but gets too low in turn one on lap 89, and crashed hard into the outside wall. He suffers a separated shoulder, his second injury of the season. The rough apron of turn one was stained by lime, which caused Andretti's car to lose traction.

Rick Mears, who had not won a race in two years, led Geoff Brabham late in the race, but was low on fuel. Mears' car sputtered on the final lap, but he crossed the line under power to take the victory. It was the first 500-mile race victory for the Ilmor Chevy Indy V-8 engine. Brabham, meanwhile, scored a career-best second place, and the best finish yet for the new Brabham-Honda engine. Roberto Guerrero, who led with 17 laps to go, dropped to third when he was forced to pit for fuel five laps from the end.

Points leader Bobby Rahal came home 5th, and maintained a championship lead of 14 points over Michael Andretti.

==== Road America ====
After four months of disappointments and injuries, Mario Andretti finally found the winner's circle for the first time since the season opener. Despite recovering from a separated shoulder, Andretti won the pole and dominated the race wire-to-wire, leading all 50 laps. Geoff Brabham scored his second runner-up finish in a row.

The top two drivers in the points standings, Bobby Rahal and Michael Andretti, both finished out of the points.

==== Mid-Ohio ====
Bobby Rahal was leading by half a lap and looking for his third consecutive victory at Mid-Ohio. With about 12 laps to go, however, Rahal tangled with the lapped car of Rick Miaskiewicz, forcing him to pit with a punctured tire.

Roberto Guerrero blew by the limping car of Rahal to take the lead on lap 74, and Michael Andretti swept into second. Andretti had a golden opportunity to make up ground in the championship hunt, but a few laps later, blew his engine. Rahal climbed back up to second, while Guerrero won his second race of the season.

Four days later, Guerrero would be injured during a tire test at Indianapolis. He was struck in the head by a tire, leaving him in a coma, and sidelined for the remainder of the season.

==== Nazareth ====
CART made its debut at the newly reconstructed Pennsylvania International Raceway in Nazareth. Hometown driver Michael Andretti led 150 laps, looking to make up as much ground as possible in the championship hunt against Bobby Rahal.

Al Unser drove substitution for the injured Roberto Guerrero, charging to as high as second place late in the race. With seven laps to go, Unser touched wheels with Jeff MacPherson, and smacked the outside wall coming out of turn 4. Rahal, who had lost a lap after nearly stalling in the pits, moved up to second at the checkered flag. With two races remaining, Rahal held a 25-point lead.

==== Laguna Seca ====
With the championship down to two drivers, Bobby Rahal and Michael Andretti, Rahal needed to finish the final two races to hold on to his second-consecutive CART title. Rahal had won the Laguna Seca event three years in a row, going for four.

When Michael Andretti dropped out on lap 36 with alternator trouble, Rahal clinched the championship title, regardless of his finish at the final race in Miami. Later in the race, Mario Andretti dropped out, enabling Rahal to take the lead and win at Laguna Seca for a record fourth year in a row. Rahal celebrated in victory lane both the race win and the CART championship title.

Also making news at Laguna Seca was the debut of the Porsche Indy car team led by Al Holbert. A week after substituting for Roberto Guerrero, Al Unser was back on the track in another car, this time behind the wheel of the new Porsche. The effort started out on a sour note, however. The car was slow and dropped out after only seven laps with a broken water pump. It would be Unser's lone race with the team, and the only event the chassis would race. The following year the Porsche team would switch to March chassis.

==== Tamiami Park ====
With the championship title already decided, Michael Andretti dominated en route to victory, but still finished second in the points standings.

Rahal, who had won the exhibition Marlboro Challenge a day earlier, finished 7th.

=== Driver Standings ===
Pos	Driver	LBH (United States)	PHX (United States)	INDY (United States)	MIL (United States)	POR (United States)	MEA (United States)	CLE (United States)	TOR (Canada)	MIS (United States)	POC (United States)	ROA (United States)	MOH (United States)	NAZ (United States)	LAG (United States)	MAR (United States)	TAM (United States)	Pts
1	(United States) Bobby Rahal	23	2	26	2	1*	1*	2	**3**	3	5	23	2*	2	1	1*	7	188
2	(United States) Michael Andretti	4	4	29	1	2	5	6	5	**1***	8	16	13	**1***	22	7	1*	158
3	(United States) Al Unser Jr.	2	14	4	5	20	8	3	20	18	23	3	23	6	4	5	2	107
4	(Colombia) Roberto Guerrero	12	1*	2	**16***	**19**	19	**5***	4	14	3	7	**1**					106
5	(United States) Rick Mears	9	20	23	21	3	18	7	10	21	1*	9	4	3	3	6	5	102
6	(United States) Mario Andretti	**1***	**5**	**9***	17	10	**2**	10	15	19	**19**	**1***	17	19	**17***	8	**4**	100
7	(Netherlands) Arie Luyendyk	14	3	18	4	16	6	19	7	5	4	4	11	4	6	10	11	98
8	(Australia) Geoff Brabham	16	8	24	12	9	4	22	DNS	8	2	2	7	12	5		3	90
9	(United States) Danny Sullivan	22	11	13	11	11	20	4	2	4	17	5	3	22	2	2	12	87
10	(Brazil) Emerson Fittipaldi	19	18	16	7	14	3	1	1*	7	18	18	6	21	20	4	10	78
11	(Mexico) Josele Garza	5	6	17	22	6	24	16	17	12	11	11	8	8	8		18	46
12	(Italy) Fabrizio Barbazza RY	17	12	3	14	4	16	24	11	6	14	8	24	13	Wth		28	42
13	(United States) Al Unser			1						2	15			10	24	9	DNQ	39
14	(United States) Tom Sneva	3	17	14	13	21	7	8	6	30							9	37
15	(Republic of Ireland) Derek Daly			15	3	15	9	11	16	24	10	26	9	16	14		22	27
16	(United States) Kevin Cogan	18	21	31	18		12	21	13	27	9	19	5	5	18		21	25
17	(United States) John Andretti R											6	10	11	7		8	24
18	(United States) Johnny Rutherford	23	9	11	9	7	11	9	21	28	26	24	12	20	15		16	23
19	(United States) Jeff MacPherson	10	13	8	8	13	21	17	22	23	20	25	21	9	9		24	21
20	(United States) Dick Simon	20	10	6	20	18	14	23	23	9	21			18				15
21	(United States) Randy Lewis	8	19	32	19	8	23	12	9	15	16	13	22	DNQ	19		19	15
22	(United States) Scott Brayton			12		5	10			22	25							14
23	(United States) A. J. Foyt			19	6					26	7			7			25	14
24	(United States) Gary Bettenhausen		16	5	15					13	13							10
25	(United States) Pancho Carter			27						20	6	14	14	17	12		14	9
26	(United States) Chip Robinson	6					25							15				8
27	(Brazil) Raul Boesel														16	**3**	6	8
28	(Canada) Scott Goodyear R						22	15	8			20	18		11		15	7
29	(United States) Tony Bettenhausen Jr.	11	15	10	DNQ		13	20	DNS	11	22	15	25					7
30	(Belgium) Didier Theys R	7										22					17	6
31	(Australia) Dennis Firestone	21	7	Wth														6
32	(United States) Stan Fox			7														6
33	(United States) Jeff Wood R											10	15	DNQ	10		23	6
34	(Canada) Ludwig Heimrath Jr.	15	22	30	10	12	17	18	19	25	12		15		23		DNQ	5
35	(United States) Davy Jones R			28						10			19	14			13	3
36	(United States) Rick Miaskiewicz			DNQ		22		14	12				16					1
37	(United States) Wally Dallenbach Jr. R											12						1
38	(United States) John Richards R						26	13	14						13			0
39	(United States) Rocky Moran	13		DNQ														0
40	(United States) Dale Coyne	Wth	Wth		Wth	17	15	25	18	DNQ	24	17	20	DNQ	21		DNQ	0
41	(United States) Ed Pimm			21						16								0
42	(United States) Danny Ongais			Wth						17				DNQ			27	0
43	(United Kingdom) Ian Ashley																20	0
43	(United States) Rich Vogler			20														0
45	(New Zealand) Graham McRae											21	DNQ				Wth	0
46	(United States) Gordon Johncock			22														0
47	(United States) Steve Chassey			25														0
48	(Italy) Fulvio Ballabio R																26	0
49	(United States) Dick Ferguson			Wth						29								0
50	(United States) George Snider			33														0
	(United States) Phil Krueger			DNQ													Wth	-
	(United States) Dominic Dobson			DNQ														-
	(United States) Sammy Swindell			DNQ														-
	(United States) Al Holbert																DNQ	-
	(United States) Mike Nish	Wth	Wth															-
	(United States) Johnny Parsons			Wth														-
	(United Kingdom) Jim Crawford			Wth														-
Pos	Driver	LBH (United States)	PHX (United States)	INDY (United States)	MIL (United States)	POR (United States)	MEA (United States)	CLE (United States)	TOR (Canada)	MIS (United States)	POC (United States)	ROA (United States)	MOH (United States)	NAZ (United States)	LAG (United States)	MAR (United States)	TAM (United States)	Pts

Color	Result
Gold	Winner
Silver	2nd place
Bronze	3rd place
Green	4th-6th place
Light Blue	7th–12th place
Dark Blue	Finished (Outside Top 12)
Purple	Did not finish
Red	Did not qualify (DNQ)
Brown	Withdrawn (Wth)
Black	Disqualified (DSQ)
White	Did not start (DNS)
Blank	Did not participate (DNP)
Blank	Driver replacement (Rpl)
Blank	Injured (Inj)
Blank	Race not held (NH)
Blank	Not competing

**In-line notation**
**Bold**	Pole position
Italics	Ran fastest race lap
*	Led most race laps
RY	Rookie of the Year
R	Rookie

== See also ==
- 1987 Indianapolis 500
- 1987 American Racing Series season
