= List of USAC Championship Car seasons =

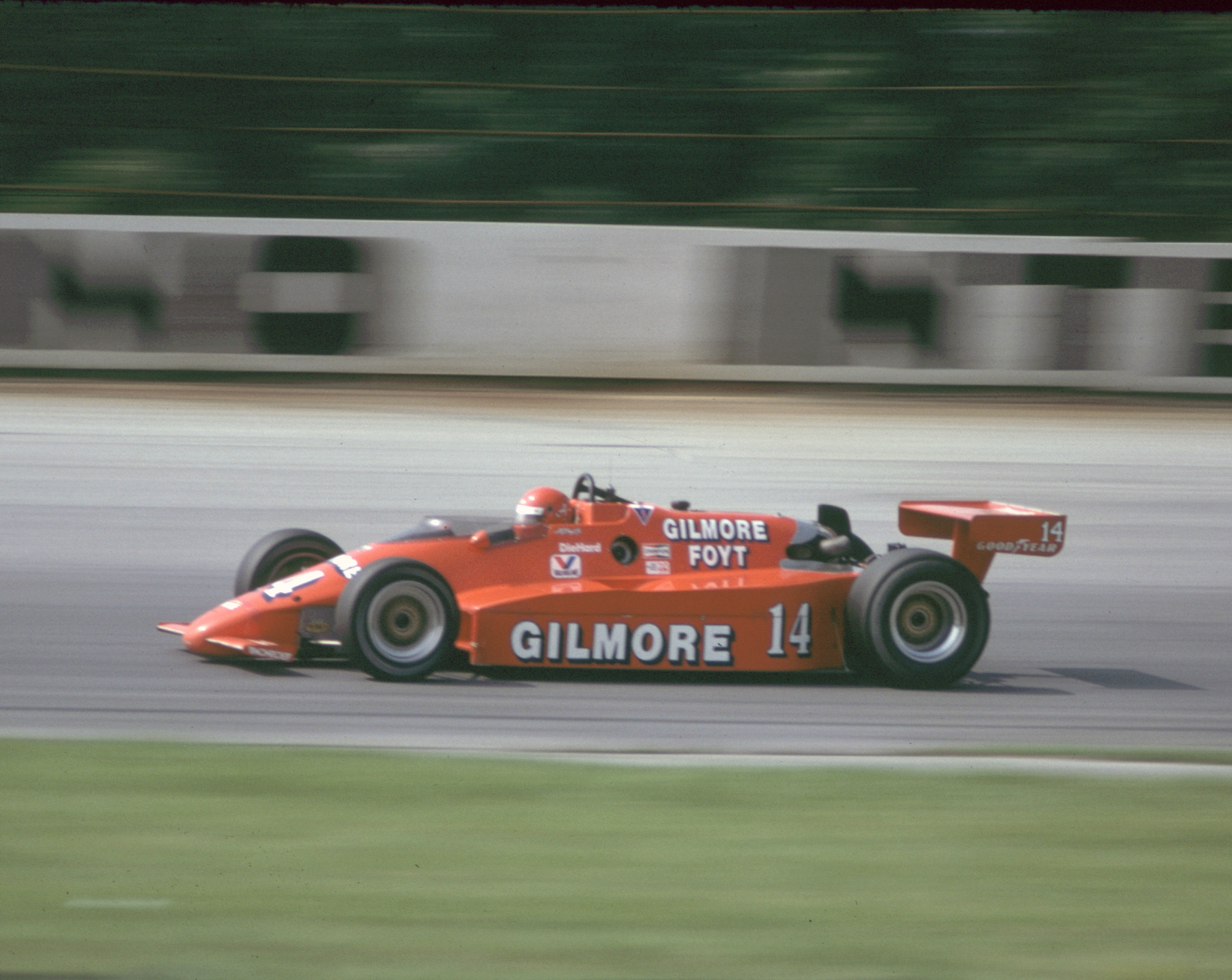
A. J. Foyt driving a Championship Car in 1984

From 1956 to 1978, the United States Auto Club (USAC) sanctioned Championship Car class featured the top teams and drivers in U.S. open-wheel racing. Until 1971, races included road courses, ovals, dirt courses, and, on occasion, a hill climb. Thereafter, the schedule consisted mainly of paved ovals. In 1979, the majority of car owners left the USAC to race under the auspices of Championship Auto Racing Teams (CART). This led to a decline in the number of events in the schedule, and by the 1984–85 season, the Championship comprised only one race, the Indianapolis 500. The era of USAC Championship Cars concluded with the formation of the Indy Racing League (IRL) in 1995, which was sanctioned by USAC until June 1997 when the IRL assumed officiating duties after the controversial finish of the 81st Indianapolis 500 and a scoring mistake that marred the following event. The most successful driver in USAC Championship Car history was A. J. Foyt with seven National Championships and four Indianapolis 500 victories. Foyt competed in every season from 1957 to 1992–93.

== Seasons ==
=== USAC Championship Trail ===
#	Season	Races					National Champion	Indianapolis 500	Drivers		Ref
#	Season	Dirt Oval	Hill Climb	Paved Oval	Road	Total	National Champion	Indianapolis 500	Ranked	Fatalities	Ref
1	1956	8 (1)	(1)	4 (1)	-	12 (3)	(United States) Jimmy Bryan	(United States) Pat Flaherty	36	-	
2	1957	9 (1)	(1)	4 (3)	-	13 (5)	(United States) Jimmy Bryan	(United States) Sam Hanks	41	1	
3	1958	8 (1)	(1)	5 (3)	-	13 (5)	(United States) Tony Bettenhausen	(United States) Jimmy Bryan	38	3	
4	1959	7 (1)	(1)	6 (1)	-	13 (3)	(United States) Rodger Ward	(United States) Rodger Ward	50	7	
5	1960	7 (1)	(1)	5	-	12 (2)	(United States) A. J. Foyt	(United States) Jim Rathmann	45	1	
6	1961	7	(1)	5	-	12 (1)	(United States) A. J. Foyt	(United States) A. J. Foyt	43	2	
7	1962	7	(1)	6	-	13 (1)	(United States) Rodger Ward	(United States) Rodger Ward	39	1	
8	1963	6	(1)	6	-	12 (1)	(United States) A. J. Foyt	(United States) Parnelli Jones	36	-	
9	1964	5	(1)	8	-	13 (1)	(United States) A. J. Foyt	(United States) A. J. Foyt	46	4	
10	1965	4	1	12	1	18	(United States) Mario Andretti	(United Kingdom) Jim Clark	57	-	
11	1966	4	1	10	1 (1)	16 (1)	(United States) Mario Andretti	(United Kingdom) Graham Hill	57	1	
12	1967	4	1	10	6	21	(United States) A. J. Foyt	(United States) A. J. Foyt	62	-	
13	1968	5	1	13	9	28	(United States) Bobby Unser	(United States) Bobby Unser	68	2	
14	1969	5	1	10	8	24	(United States) Mario Andretti	(United States) Mario Andretti	72	-	
15	1970	5	(1)	10	3	18 (1)	(United States) Al Unser	(United States) Al Unser	55	-	
16	1971	-	-	12	-	12	(United States) Joe Leonard	(United States) Al Unser	44	-	
17	1972	-	-	10	-	10	(United States) Joe Leonard	(United States) Mark Donohue	42	1	
18	1973	-	-	16	-	16	(United States) Roger McCluskey	(United States) Gordon Johncock	36	3	
19	1974	-	-	14	-	14	(United States) Bobby Unser	(United States) Johnny Rutherford	37	-	
20	1975	-	-	13	-	13	(United States) A. J. Foyt	(United States) Bobby Unser	38	-	
21	1976	-	-	13	-	13	(United States) Gordon Johncock	(United States) Johnny Rutherford	39	-	
22	1977	-	-	13	1	14	(United States) Tom Sneva	(United States) A. J. Foyt	41	-	
23	1978	-	-	15	3	18	(United States) Tom Sneva	(United States) Al Unser	45	-	
24	1979	-	-	7	-	7	(United States) A. J. Foyt	(United States) Rick Mears	32	-	

=== Championship Racing League (CRL) ===
#	Season	Races			National Champion	Indianapolis 500	Drivers		Ref
#	Season	Paved Oval	Road	Total	National Champion	Indianapolis 500	Ranked	Fatalities	Ref
25	1980	4	1	5	(United States) Johnny Rutherford	(United States) Johnny Rutherford	57	-	

=== USAC Gold Crown Championship ===
#	Season	Races			National Champion	Indianapolis 500	Drivers		Ref
#	Season	Dirt Oval	Paved Oval	Total	National Champion	Indianapolis 500	Ranked	Fatalities	Ref
26	1981–82	3	3	6	(United States) George Snider	(United States) Bobby Unser*	51	1	
26	1981–82	3	3	6	(United States) George Snider	(United States) Gordon Johncock*	51	1	
27	1982–83	3	1	4	(United States) Tom Sneva		39	-	
28	1983–84	1	1	2	(United States) Rick Mears		39	-	
29	1984–85	-	1	1	(United States) Danny Sullivan		32	-	
30	1985–86	-	1	1	(United States) Bobby Rahal		33	-	
31	1986–87	-	1	1	(United States) Al Unser		33	-	
32	1987–88	-	1	1	(United States) Rick Mears		33	-	
33	1988–89	-	1	1	(Brazil) Emerson Fittipaldi		33	-	
34	1989–90	-	1	1	(Netherlands) Arie Luyendyk		33	-	
35	1990–91	-	1	1	(United States) Rick Mears		33	-	
36	1991–92	-	1	1	(United States) Al Unser Jr.		33	1	
37	1992–93	-	1	1	(Brazil) Emerson Fittipaldi		33	-	
38	1993–94	-	1	1	(United States) Al Unser Jr.		33	-	
39	1994–95	-	1	1	(Canada) Jacques Villeneuve		33	-	
40	1996	-	3	3	(United States) Buzz Calkins	(United States) Buddy Lazier	37	1	
40	1996	-	3	3	(United States) Scott Sharp	(United States) Buddy Lazier	37	1	
41	1996-97	-	6**	6**	None (season aborted)		N/A	-	

* The 1981–82 season included both the 65th and 66th Indianapolis 500 races.
( ) Figures in parentheses denote the number of non-championship races in that season.

** The IRL dropped USAC sanction following a scoring error at Texas Motor Speedway.

== See also ==
- List of American Championship Car winners
- List of American Championship Car Rookie of the Year Winners
- Indianapolis 500 Rookie of the Year
- List of Indianapolis 500 winners
