= IROC V =

Motor car races held in 1977–1978

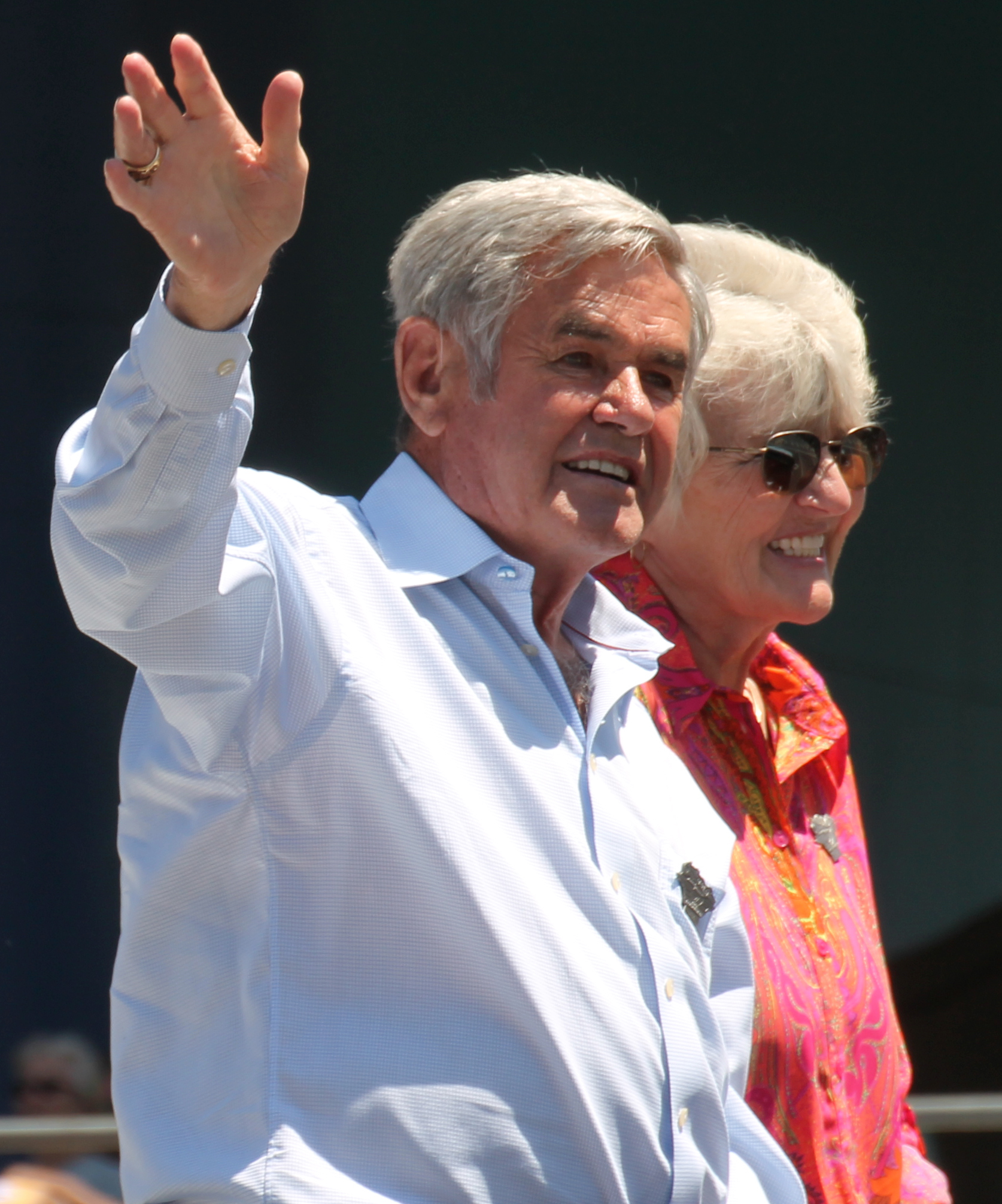
Al Unser won the IROC V championship

IROC V was the fifth year of IROC competition, which took place over three weekends in 1977 and 1978. It saw the use of the Chevrolet Camaro in all races, and the schedule was held over in its entirety from IROC IV. Al Unser won two races en route to the championship and $50,000.

The roster of drivers and final points standings were as follows:

Rank	Driver	Winnings	Series
1	(United States) Al Unser	$50,000	USAC Champ Car
2	(United States) Mario Andretti	$26,000	Formula One
3	(United States) Darrell Waltrip	$23,000	NASCAR Winston Cup
4	(United States) Cale Yarborough	$23,000	NASCAR Winston Cup
5	(United States) Richard Petty	$20,000	NASCAR Winston Cup
6	(United States) Gordon Johncock	$17,500	USAC Champ Car
7	(United States) Benny ParsonsAll	$16,000	NASCAR Winston Cup
8	(Belgium) Jacky Ickx	$15,000	Formula One
9	(United States) Johnny Rutherford	$12,000	USAC Champ Car
10	(Sweden) Gunnar Nilsson3	$7,500	Formula One
11	(United States) Tom Sneva	$7,500	USAC Champ Car
12	(United States) Al Holbert	$7,500	IMSA Camel GT

== Race results ==
=== Michigan International Speedway, Race One ===
1. Al Unser
2. Cale Yarborough
3. Darrell Waltrip
4. Richard Petty
5. Gunnar Nilsson
6. Gordon Johncock
7. Mario Andretti
8. Johnny Rutherford
9. Benny Parsons
10. Al Holbert
11. Tom Sneva
12. Jacky Ickx

=== Riverside International Raceway, Race Two ===
1. Al Unser
2. Richard Petty
3. Gordon Johncock
4. Mario Andretti
5. Darrell Waltrip
6. Gunnar Nilsson
7. Johnny Rutherford
8. Jacky Ickx
9. Benny Parsons
10. Cale Yarborough
11. Al Holbert
12. Tom Sneva

=== Riverside International Raceway, Race Three ===
1. Cale Yarborough
2. Mario Andretti
3. Al Unser
4. Darrell Waltrip
5. Richard Petty
6. Gunnar Nilsson
7. Jacky Ickx
8. Benny Parsons
9. Johnny Rutherford
10. Gordon Johncock
11. Tom Sneva
12. Al Holbert

=== Daytona International Speedway, Race Four ===
1. Mario Andretti
2. Darrell Waltrip
3. Gordon Johncock
4. Cale Yarborough
5. Benny Parsons
6. Jacky Ickx
7. Al Unser
8. Richard Petty
9. Johnny Rutherford
