= 1971 USAC National Dirt Car Championship =

American auto racing season

Seasons
- ← 1970 1972 →

The 1971 USAC National Dirt Car Championship was the first season of the newly formed USAC National Dirt Car Championship. The inaugural champion was George Snider. The Dirt Car championship was created after dirt races were dropped from the schedule of the USAC Championship Car series following the 1970 season.

== Technical rules ==
The existing USAC National Championship was a mixture of road courses, hill climbs and paved or dirt oval races. For the 1971 season this championship switched exclusively to paved ovals. Especially on the paved ovals rear-engined cars dominated the races whereas on the dirt ovals the front-engined cars were superior.

The cars' construction mainly stayed with front engines as established after World War II. The cars with wheelbase of at least 96 inches. Overhead camshaft engines were restricted to 256.284 cubic inches (4.2 liters) and stock block engine could use up to 305.1 cubic inches (5.0 liters).

== Confirmed entries ==
Team / Owner	Chassis	Engine	No	Drivers	Rounds
Agajanian-Faas Racers	Watson 64	Ford	98	Sammy Sessions	1
Agajanian-Faas Racers	Watson 64	Offenhauser	98	Sammy Sessions	2–4
A. J. Foyt Enterprises	Meskowski 69	Foyt	9	A. J. Foyt	2–4
Bob Harkey	Meskowski 59	Offenhauser	52	Bob Harkey	All
Carl Gehlhausen Racing	Kurtis 4000D 343	Offenhauser	84	Tom Bigelow	1
Carl Gehlhausen Racing	Kurtis 4000D 343	Offenhauser	84	Jim Malloy	2–4
CHEK Inc.	Turner 62	Chevrolet	44	Arnie Knepper	All
Danny Burke	Moore 65	Offenhauser	33	Ronnie Burke	2–4
Don Rogala	unknown	Offenhauser	36	Billy Vukovich Jr.	1
Don Rogala	unknown	Offenhauser	36	Jimmy Caruthers	2–4
Federal Engineering	Meskowski 64	Offenhauser	3	Johnny Parsons	4
Gerhardt Racing	unknown	Plymouth	16	Gary Bettenhausen	2–4
Harry Conklin	unknown	Offenhauser	64	Bill Puterbaugh	1
Helen Reynard	Kuzma	Offenhauser	75	Jim Reynard	All
Jim McElreath	McElreath 69	Chevrolet	14	Jim McElreath	All
Joe Hunt	Lesovksy 58	Offenhauser	99	Merle Bettenhausen	2–4
Jordan	unknown	Chevrolet	69	Duke Cook	3–4
Ken Brenn	Meskowski 62	Offenhauser	57	Lee Kunzman	All
Leader Card	Watson 62	Offenhauser	4	George Snider	All
Lindsey Hopkins	Meskowski 61	Offenhauser	6	Roger McCluskey	4
Louis Senter	Meskowski 63	Offenhauser	22	Don Hawley	All
Louis Seymour	Meskowski 61	Chevrolet	39	Joe Saldana	1
Louis Seymour	Meskowski 61	Offenhauser	39	Bruce Walkup	2–4
Mataka Brothers	Blum 62	Offenhauser	31	Jerry Karl	1
Mataka Brothers	Blum 62	Offenhauser	31	Joe Saldana	2–4
MVS Racing	Ward 67	Offenhauser	19	Bill Puterbaugh	2, 4
Ray Smith	Ward 68	Chevrolet	70	Carl Williams	1
Ray Smith	Ward 68	Chevrolet	70	Tom Bigelow	2–4
Richard Blacker	Cannon 70	Chevrolet	47	Larry Cannon	2–4
Ron Hart	Cedoz 70	Chevrolet	48	Karl Busson	All
Ron Kilman	Meskowski 60	Offenhauser	25	Rollie Beale	All
Russ Ruppert	Meskowski 58	Offenhauser	17	Dick Tobias	All
Steck	unknown	Chevrolet	30	Billy Thrasher	2–4
STP Racing	Kingfish 69	Plymouth	5	Mario Andretti	2–4
STP Racing	Kingfish 70	Chevrolet	40	Larry Dickson	All
STP Racing	Kingfish 70	Gurney Weslake	60	Greg Weld	1–3
STP Racing	Kingfish 69	Plymouth	60	Greg Weld	4
Tim DelRose Enterprises	Kuzma 60	Offenhauser	18	Johnny Rutherford	All
Two Jacks	Gerhardt 66	GM Allison Turbine	29	Art Pollard	3–4
United Championship Racers	Dunlop 64	Offenhauser	24	Gary Bettenhausen	1
United Championship Racers	Dunlop 64	Offenhauser	24	Billy Vukovich Jr.	2–4
Vatis Enterprises	Vollstedt 59	Offenhauser	94	Carl Williams	2–4
Vel's Parnelli Jones Racing	Kingfish 69	Ford	1	Al Unser	1, 4
Walmotors	Meskowski 59	Offenhauser	77	Salt Walther	2–4
Walt Flynn	Flynn 64	Offenhauser	58	Ralph Liguori	All
Wib Spalding	Meskowski	Chevrolet	15	Bill Puterbaugh	3
Wib Spalding	Meskowski	Chevrolet	15	Don Nordhorn	4

== Schedule and results ==
The season consisted of four 100 mile dirt races.

Rnd	Date	Race name	Track	Location	Pole position	Winning driver
1	June 20	Nazareth 100	Nazareth National Speedway	Nazareth, Pennsylvania	Larry Dickson	Jim McElreath
2	August 22	Tony Bettenhausen 100	Illinois State Fairgrounds	Springfield, Illinois	Greg Weld	A. J. Foyt
3	September 6	Ted Horn Memorial	Du Quoin State Fairgrounds	Du Quoin, Illinois	Greg Weld	George Snider
4	September 11	Hoosier Hundred	Indiana State Fairgrounds	Indianapolis, Indiana	Al Unser	Al Unser

== Final point standings ==
The driver's championship was won by George Snider of 26 classified drivers. The entrants championships went to the #4 car of Leader Card, Inc.

Pos	Driver	NAZ	SPR	DUQ	ISF	Pts
1	George Snider	18	2*	1	2	520
2	Jim McElreath	1	3	Wth	6	420
3	A. J. Foyt		1	9	4	360
4	Billy Vukovich Jr.	4	22	3	5	360
5	Don Hawley	3	4	6	DNQ	340
6	Arnie Knepper	2	11	5	9	320
7	Al Unser	10*			**1***	230
8	Bob Harkey	6	8	7	11	210
9	Larry Dickson	**DNS**	10	21	3	170
10	Bill Puterbaugh	20	18	4	8	170
11	Greg Weld	13	**15**	**2***	Wth	160
12	Sammy Sessions	9	12	23	7	110
13	Gary Bettenhausen	5	20	DNQ	18	100
14	Jimmy Caruthers		5	16	21	100
15	Merle Bettenhausen		7	14	10	90
16	Rollie Beale	19	6	Wth	DNQ	80
17	Jerry Karl	7				60
18	Ralph Liguori	8	24	22	Wth	50
19	Johnny Rutherford	16	17	8	20	50
20	Carl Williams	15	9	18	14	40
21	Ronnie Burke	Wth	10	DNQ		30
22	Dick Tobias	11	DNQ	DNQ	DNQ	20
23	Joe Saldana	DNS	19	11	16	20
24	Jim Reynard	12	DNQ	DNQ	DNQ	10
25	Salt Walther		14	12	DNQ	10
26	Don Nordhorn				12	10
-	Mario Andretti		13	17	17	0
-	Jim Malloy		21	19	13	0
-	Lee Kunzman	DNS	23	13	DNQ	0
-	Karl Busson	14	16	DNQ	19	0
-	Johnny Parsons				15	0
-	Larry Cannon		DNQ	15	DNQ	0
-	Tom Bigelow	17	Wth	20	DNQ	0
-	Bruce Walkup		DNS	24	22	0
-	Roger McCluskey				23	0
-	Art Pollard			DNQ	24	0
-	Billy Thrasher		DNQ	DNQ	DNQ	0
-	Duke Cook			DNQ	Wth	0
Pos	Driver	NAZ	SPR	DUQ	ISF	Pts

Color	Result
Gold	Winner
Silver	2nd place
Bronze	3rd place
Green	4th & 5th place
Light Blue	6th-10th place
Dark Blue	Finished (Outside Top 10)
Purple	Did not finish (Ret)
Red	Did not qualify (DNQ)
Brown	Withdrawn (Wth)
Black	Disqualified (DSQ)
White	Did not start (DNS)
Blank	Did not participate (DNP)
Blank	Not competing

**In-line notation**
**Bold**	Pole position
Italics	Ran fastest race lap
*	Led most race laps
RY Rookie of the Year
R Rookie
