= 1972 USAC National Dirt Car Championship =

American auto racing season

Seasons
- ← 1971 1973 →

The 1972 USAC National Dirt Car Championship was the second season of the USAC National Dirt Car Championship. The season champion was A .J. Foyt.

== Confirmed entries ==
Team / Owner	No	Drivers	Rounds
Albert Harrison	91	Darl Harrison	All
A. J. Foyt Enterprises	3	A. J. Foyt	All
Bernie Cedoz	59	Karl Busson	2–3
Bob Harkey	8	Bob Harkey	2–3
Bob Harkey	8	Larry Dickson	4
Carl Gehlhausen Racing	84	Jerry Karl	1
Carl Gehlhausen Racing	84	Tom Bigelow	2–4
CHEK Inc.	6	Arnie Knepper	All
Crower/Beck	21	George Snider	1
Crower/Beck	21	Curt Waters	2–3
Danny Burke	33	Ronnie Burke	2–4
D. J. Caruthers	15	Jimmy Caruthers	1, 3–4
D. J. Caruthers	15	Johnny Rutherford	2
Don Rogala	36	Pancho Carter	2
Don Rogala	36	Johnny Rutherford	3–4
Federal Engineering	22	Johnny Parsons	1
Federal Engineering	22	Joe Saldana	2–4
Grant King Racers	44	Jackie Howerton	1
Grant King Racers	44	Rollie Beale	2–4
Gus Sohm	83	Billy Engelhart	3–4
Harry Conklin	64	Billy Engelhart	2
Harry Conklin	64	Don Hawley	3
Harry Conklin	64	Charles Masters	4
Jerry Miller	65	Jerry Miller	2–4
Jim McElreath	2	Jim McElreath	All
Joe Hunt	99	Bob Evans	2–4
LAF-GEF Inc.	12	Sammy Sessions	All
LAF-GEF Inc.	25	Bob Evans	1
LAF-GEF Inc.	25	Rick Goudy	2–4
Leader Cards Racers	4	Larry Dickson	2
Leader Cards Racers	4	Al Unser	3
Leader Cards Racers	4	Mike Mosley	4
Louis Senter	5	Don Hawley	1–2, 4
Louis Senter	59	Karl Busson	4
Louis Seymour	29	Bruce Walkup	3–4
Mataka Brothers	31	Joe Saldana	1
Mataka Brothers	31	Carl Williams	2–4
Mike Riley	38	Rick Muther	1
Mike Riley	38	Jigger Sirois	2–3
Mike Riley	38	Art Pollard	4
MVS Racing	1	George Snider	2–4
Ray Smith	70	Tom Bigelow	1
Ray Smith	70	Bill Puterbaugh	2–4
R. B. Racing Associates	55	Lee Kunzman	All
Rieder Racers	81	Pancho Carter	1, 3–4
Speedway Motors	54	Don Nordhorn	3–4
STP Racing	40	Larry Dickson	3
STP Racing	60	Greg Weld	2–4
United Championship Racers	24	Billy Vukovich Jr.	1–3
United Championship Racers	24	Roger McCluskey	4
Vatis Enterprises	95	Carl Williams	1
Vatis Enterprises	95	Johnny Parsons	2–4
Vel's Parnelli Jones Racing	1	Al Unser	2, 4
Walmotors	77	Salt Walther	4
Walt Flynn	58	Ralph Liguori	1
Wib Spalding	15	Bud Tingelstad	1
Wib Spalding	15	Dick Tobias	2
Wib Spalding	15	"Allen"	3
Wib Spalding	15	Bob Harkey	4
Windmill Truckers Center	27	Dick Tobias	3–4
unknown	72	Larry Cannon	3
unknown	72	Billy Casella	4

== Schedule and results ==
The season consisted of four dirt races.

Rnd	Date	Race Name	Track	Location	Pole position	Winning driver
1	May 28	Coca-Cola Bottling 100	Du Quoin State Fairgrounds	Du Quoin, Illinois	Arnie Knepper	Tom Bigelow
2	August 20	Tony Bettenhausen 100	Illinois State Fairgrounds	Springfield, Illinois	Lee Kunzman	Al Unser
3	September 4	Ted Horn Memorial	Du Quoin State Fairgrounds	Du Quoin, Illinois	Lee Kunzman	A.J. Foyt
4	September 9	Hoosier Hundred	Indiana State Fairgrounds	Indianapolis, Indiana	Al Unser	Al Unser

== Final point standings ==
The driver championship was won by A.J. Foyt of 28 classified drivers. The entrant championships went to the #3 car of A.J. Foyt Enterprises.

Pos	Driver	Points
1	A.J. Foyt	550
2	Al Unser	450
3	Arnie Knepper	350
4	Tom Bigelow	290
5	George Snider	260
6	Bill Puterbaugh	200
7	Johnny Rutherford	180
8	Rollie Beale	170
9	Carl Williams	150
10	Sam Sessions	150
