= 1970 USAC Championship Car season =

Sports season

- USAC National Championship Trail

Season
- Races: 18
- Start date: March 28
- End date: November 21

Awards
- National champion: (United States) Al Unser
- Indianapolis 500 winner: (United States) Al Unser

The 1970 USAC Championship Car season consisted of 18 races, beginning in Avondale, Arizona on March 28 and concluding at the same location on November 21. There was also one non-championship event at Pikes Peak, Colorado. The USAC National Champion and Indianapolis 500 winner was Al Unser. After this season, dirt courses did not reappear in the USAC Championship until 1981-82. Road courses after this season did not reappear in the USAC Championship until 1977. The Pikes Peak Auto Hill Climb was the only non-championship event. Also of note, the series added a second 500 mile race at the new Ontario Motor Speedway.

== Entrants ==
(partial list)

Team	Chassis	Engine	Drivers	Rounds
(United States) Vel's Parnelli Jones Racing	Colt (1-9, 11-12, 16, 18), King (10, 13-15, 17)	Ford	(United States) Al Unser	All
(United States) Vel's Parnelli Jones Racing	Colt	Ford	(United States) Joe Leonard	4-5, 12
(United States) Leader Card Racing	Eagle (1-9, 11-12, 16, 18), Watson (10, 13-15, 17), Ward (17)	Ford(1-5, 7, 9, 11-12, 16, 18), Offenhauser (6, 8, 10, 13-15, 17)	(United States) Bobby Unser	All
(United States) Leader Card Racing	Watson (1-11, 13-18), Eagle (12)	Offenhauser	(United States) Mike Mosley	All
(United States) Leader Card Racing	Epperly (1), Coyote (4), Watson (8-9, 12, 16, 18), Dunlop (10, 13-15, 17)	Offenhauser (1, 8-10, 12-17), Ford ( 4, 18)	(United States) George Snider	1, 4, 8-10, 12-18
(United States) A.J. Foyt Enterprises	Gerhardt (1, 3, 5), Coyote (4, 12), McElreath (10, 13-15, 17), Eagle (18)	Ford (4, 12, 18), Chevrolet (10, 13-15, 17), Offenhauser(1, 3, 5)	(United States) Jim McElreath	All
(United States) A.J. Foyt Enterprises	Coyote (1-5, 7-9, 11-12, 18), Meskowski (10, 13-15)	Ford	(United States) A.J. Foyt	1-5, 7-15, 18
(United States) A.J. Foyt Enterprises	Eagle	Ford	(United States) Donnie Allison	4
(United States) A.J. Foyt Enterprises	Coyote	Ford	(United States) George Snider	4
(United States) Andy Granatelli	Gerhardt (1, 3, 5), Coyote (4, 12), McElreath (10, 13-15, 17), Eagle (18)	Ford (4, 12, 18), Chevrolet (10, 13-15, 17), Offenhauser (1, 3, 5)	(United States) Mario Andretti	All
(United States) Andy Granatelli	Kuzma	Offenhauser	(United States) Larry Dickson	10, 13-15, 17
(United States) Andy Granatelli	Hawk	Ford	(United States) George Folmer	4, 12
(United States) Andy Granatelli	Kuzma	Offenhauser	(United States) Bill Vukovich II	17
(United States) Andy Granatelli	Hawk	Ford	(United States) Steve Krisiloff	16
(United States) Agajanian-Faas Racers	Brabham	Offenhauser	(United States) Bill Vukovich II	2
(United States) Hayhoe Racing Enterprises	Scorpion (1, 3-6, 7-9, 11-12, 16, 18), Meskowski (15, 17)	Ford (1, 3-6, 7-9, 11-12, 16, 18),, Offenhauser (15, 17)	(United States) Roger McCluskey	1, 3-6, 7-9, 11-12, 15-18
(United States) Hayhoe Racing Enterprises	Gerhardt (1), King (3-5), Vollstedt (7), Morris (8, 11, 16, 18), Scorpion (12)"	Offenhauser (1, 3-5), Ford (7-8, 11-12, 16, 18)	(United States) Art Pollard	1, 3-5, 7-8, 11-12, 16, 18
(United States) Johncock Racing Team	Gerhardt (1, 3-5), McLaren (6, 8, 12, 16), Eagle (2, 7, 9)	Offenhauser (1, 3-6, 8, 12, 16), Ford (2, 7, 9)	(United States) Gordon Johncock	1-9, 12, 16
(United States) Jerry O-Connell Racing	Brabham	Offenhauser	(United States) Bill Vukovich II	4, 18
(United Kingdom) Brabham	Brabham	Offenhauser	(Australia) Jack Brabham	4, 12
(United States) Dayton-Walther	Morris	Offenhauser	(United States) Bill Vukovich II	5, 6
(United States) Racing International	Volstedt (1-6, 8-9, 12, 16, 18), Morris (7), Moore (17)	Ford (1, 4-5, 7-9, 12, 16), Chevrolet (2-3), Offenhauser (6, 17)	(United States) Dick Simon	1-9, 12, 16-18
(United States) All American Racers	Eagle	Ford (2, 4), Offenhauser (12)	(United States) Dan Gurney	2, 4, 12
(United States) All American Racers	Eagle	Ford	(United States) Swede Savage	7, 9, 12, 18
(United States) Penske	Lola	Chevrolet (2, 12), Ford (4, 9)	(United States) Mark Donohue	2, 4, 9, 12
(United States) McLaren	Mclaren (4), Meskowski (10, 13-15, 17), Gerhardt (12)	Offenhauser	(United States) Carl Williams	4, 10, 12-15, 17
(United States) Patrick Racing	Eagle (2-6, 7-9, 11-12, 16, 18), Lesovksy (10, 13-15, 17)	Offenhauser (3-4, 8, 10-17), Ford (2, 5-6, 9, 18)	(United States) Johnny Rutherford	2-6, 8-18
(United States) Lindsey Hopkins Racing	Eagle (4-5, 11), Kuzma (8-18)	Ford (4-5, 11, 18), Offenhauser (8)	(United States) Mel Kenyon	4-5, 8, 11, 16
(United States) Lindsey Hopkins Racing	Eagle (1, 3-6, 8-9, 18), Kuzma (14, 16)	Offenhauser (1, 3-6, 8-9, 14, 16), Ford (18)	(United States) Wally Dallenbach	1, 3-6, 8-9, 14, 16, 18
(United States) Gene White Racing	Finley (1, 3-6, 11, 16, 18), Vollstedt (10, 13-15, 17)	Offenhauser	(United States) Lloyd Ruby	1, 3-5, 7, 11-12, 16, 18
(United States) Vatis Enterprises	Laycock	Offenhauser (1, 3-5, 7), Ford (11-12, 16, 18)	(United States) Bentley Warren	1, 3-6, 10-11, 13-17)
(United States) Don Gerhardt	Gerhardt (1-6, 8-9, 11-12, 16, 18), Ward (10, 13-15), Edmunds (17)	Offy (1, 3-6, 8-9, 11-18), Ford (10), Chevy (2)	(United States) Gary Bettenhausen	1-6, 8-18
(United States) Don Gerhardt	Gerhardt	Offenhauser	(United States) Larry Dickson	4
(United States) Volstedt Racing	Volstedt	Ford	(United States) Larry Dickson	18

== Schedule and results ==
Rnd	Date	Race name	Length	Track	Location	Type	Pole position	Winning driver
1	March 28	(United States) Phoenix 150	150 mi (240 km)	Phoenix International Raceway	Avondale, Arizona	Paved	(United States) Mario Andretti	(United States) Al Unser
2	April 4	(United States) Golden Gate 150	151.38 mi (243.62 km)	Sears Point Raceway	Sonoma, California	Road	(United States) Mark Donohue	(United States) Dan Gurney
3	April 26	(United States) Trenton 200	201 mi (323 km)	Trenton International Speedway	Trenton, New Jersey	Paved	(United States) Al Unser	(United States) Lloyd Ruby
4	May 30	(United States) International 500 Mile Sweepstakes	500 mi (800 km)	Indianapolis Motor Speedway	Speedway, Indiana	Paved	(United States) Al Unser	(United States) Al Unser
5	June 7	(United States) Rex Mays Classic	150 mi (240 km)	Wisconsin State Fair Park Speedway	West Allis, Wisconsin	Paved	(United States) Mario Andretti	(United States) Joe Leonard
6	June 14	(United States) Langhorne 150	150 mi (240 km)	Langhorne Speedway	Langhorne, Pennsylvania	Paved	(United States) Bobby Unser	(United States) Bobby Unser
7	June 28	(United States) Rocky Mountain 150	151.62 mi (244.01 km)	Continental Divide Raceways	Mead, Colorado	Road	(United States) Al Unser	(United States) Mario Andretti
8	July 4	(United States) Michigan Twin 200s	200 mi (320 km)	Michigan International Speedway	Brooklyn, Michigan	Paved	(United States) Gary Bettenhausen	(United States) Gary Bettenhausen
NC	July 4	(United States) Pikes Peak Auto Hill Climb	12.42 mi (19.99 km)	Pikes Peak Highway	Pikes Peak, Colorado	Hill	(United States) Orville Nance^{A}	(United States) Ted Foltz
9	July 26	(United States) Indy 150	150 mi (240 km)	Indianapolis Raceway Park	Clermont, Indiana	Road	(United States) Mario Andretti	(United States) Al Unser
10	August 22	(United States) Tony Bettenhausen 100	100 mi (160 km)	Illinois State Fairgrounds	Springfield, Illinois	Dirt	(United States) Larry Dickson	(United States) Al Unser
11	August 23	(United States) Tony Bettenhausen 200	200 mi (320 km)	Wisconsin State Fair Park Speedway	West Allis, Wisconsin	Paved	(United States) Al Unser	(United States) Al Unser
12	September 6	(United States) California 500	500 mi (800 km)	Ontario Motor Speedway	Ontario, California	Paved	(United States) Lloyd Ruby	(United States) Jim McElreath
13	September 7	(United States) Ted Horn Memorial 100	100 mi (160 km)	DuQuoin State Fairgrounds	Du Quoin, Illinois	Dirt	(United States) Al Unser	(United States) Al Unser
14	September 12	(United States) Hoosier Hundred	100 mi (160 km)	Indiana State Fairgrounds	Indianapolis, Indiana	Dirt	(United States) Johnny Parsons	(United States) Al Unser
15	September 19	(United States) Sedalia 100	100 mi (160 km)	State Fair Raceway	Sedalia, Missouri	Dirt	(United States) Al Unser	(United States) Al Unser
16	October 3	(United States) Trenton 300	264 mi (425 km)^{B}	Trenton International Speedway	Trenton, New Jersey	Paved	(United States) Al Unser	(United States) Al Unser
17	October 4	(United States) Golden State 100	100 mi (160 km)	California State Fairgrounds	Sacramento, California	Dirt	(United States) Mario Andretti	(United States) Al Unser
18	November 21	(United States) Bobby Ball 150	150 mi (240 km)	Phoenix International Raceway	Avondale, Arizona	Paved	(United States) Al Unser	(United States) Swede Savage

Paved/Dirt Oval
Road Course/Hill Climb
Non-championship race

^A No pole is awarded for the Pikes Peak Hill Climb, in this schedule on the pole is the driver who started first. No lap led was awarded for the Pikes Peak Hill Climb, however, a lap was awarded to the drivers that completed the climb.
^B Scheduled for 300 miles, stopped early due to rain.

== Final points standings ==
Note: Mark Donohue, Kevin Bartlett, Peter Revson, LeeRoy Yarbrough, John Cannon, Donnie Allison, Ron Grable, Jack Eiteljorg and Jack Brabham are not eligible for points.

Pos	Driver	PHX1 (United States)	SON (United States)	TRE1 (United States)	INDY (United States)	MIL1 (United States)	LHS (United States)	CDR (United States)	MIS (United States)	IRP (United States)	SPR (United States)	MIL2 (United States)	ONT (United States)	DQSF (United States)	ISF (United States)	SED (United States)	TRE2 (United States)	CSF (United States)	PHX2 (United States)	Pts
1	(United States) Al Unser	1	3	**3**	**1**	3	2	**5**	18	1	1	**1**	9	**1**	1	**1**	**1**	1	**2**	5130
2	(United States) Bobby Unser	2	18	4	11	6	**1**	4	2	24	9	19	22	2	DNQ	DNQ	2	6	17	2260
3	(United States) Jim McElreath	6		7	5	DNS					3		1	Wth	10	13		16	5	2060
4	(United States) Mike Mosley	5	7	5	21	7	3	15	4	14	10	5	14	18	5	4	3	8	20	1900
5	(United States) Mario Andretti	**13**	2	2	6	**5**	8	1	21	**18**	24	24	10	17	11	2	21	**14**	8	1890
6	(United States) Roger McCluskey	DNQ		DNQ	25	2	Wth		7	9		2	25			10	5	5	3	1380
7	(United States) Gordon Johncock	18	4	15	28	12	10	7	12	3			4				DNQ			1160
8	(United States) Art Pollard	11		21	30	18		19	17			11	2				6		24	1110
9	(United States) A. J. Foyt	4	Wth	6	10	24		3	8	12	15	7	15	10	3	DNQ			23	1105
10	(United States) Dick Simon R	24	6	9	14	11	9	11	19	13			3				DNQ	DNQ	9	1080
11	(United States) Dan Gurney		1		3								18							1000
12	(United States) Johnny Rutherford		5	20	18	14	DNQ		3	17	11	21	31	11	DNQ	12	4	13	6	960
13	(United States) Mel Kenyon				16	DNQ			10			3	6				9			860
14	(United States) Lloyd Ruby	3		1	27	4		17				20	**23**				22		16	790
15	(United States) Bentley Warren R	DNQ		8	DNQ	10	6				5	4		DNQ	8	5	20	11	DNQ	775
16	(United States) Gary Bettenhausen	17	21	12	26	9	5		**1**	22	20	17	19	9	DNQ	16	DNQ	9	19	710
17	(United States) Wally Dallenbach Sr.	10		17	17	8	7		16	5		9	28		DNS		15		4	620
18	(United States) Swede Savage							2		8			27						1	615
19	(United States) Jim Malloy				33	19	4		5	16	22	DNQ	11	DNQ	12	7	13		13	570
20	(United States) Greg Weld			18	32	DNQ					27		7	15	7	8	DNQ	4		530
21	(United States) George Snider	7			20				23	23	14		DNQ	4	14	15	18	2	7	460
22	(United States) Carl Williams				9						2		12	DNQ	15	DNQ		10		440
23	(United States) Jerry Grant		22		7	17		6					21				DNQ		14	420
24	(United States) Rick Muther				8	DNQ	14		DNQ				33				8		22	400
25	(United States) Sam Sessions				12	DNQ	21		6		17		DNQ		4	11			12	365
26	(United States) Steve Krisiloff	8	15	10	DNQ	22	13	18	DNQ				29				7		DNS	315
27	(United States) Larry Dickson				DNQ						**25**		DNQ	3	DNQ	3		DNS	11	310
28	(United States) John Mahler R		13	16		DNQ	15	8	9	6		14					12		DNQ	305
29	(United States) Joe Leonard				24	1							13							300
30	(United States) Bill Simpson	22	10	19	DNQ	20	19	14		7		6	DNQ				19		21	295
31	(United States) Ralph Liguori						DNQ				13			5	2	DNQ		15		260
32	(United States) Bill Vukovich II	DNS	20	DNP	23	13	12						DNQ					3	10	200
33	(United States) Max Dudley		8	22				9		DNQ		10							DNQ	195
34	(United States) Bruce Jacobi	19	9		DNQ		20		20		4	15		DNQ		DNQ	DNQ	DNQ	DNQ	180
35	(United States) Tom Bigelow				Wth	DNQ	17			DNQ	7	13		7	DNQ	6	17	17	DNQ	180
36	(United States) Bob Harkey										12	16	17	6	13	9		DNQ	DNQ	130
37	(United States) Merle Bettenhausen R										8							7		110
38	(United States) Dee Jones					DNQ						8							DNQ	100
39	(United States) Karl Busson R	9		11		DNS	18		22		23	DNS		DNQ	DNQ	DNQ	14		15	100
40	(United States) Bud Tingelstad				Wth							25	24	16		DNQ	10		18	90
41	(United States) Bruce Walkup	16			29	21	16	DNS	13		26	23	16	14	6	14	DNQ	DNQ	DNQ	80
42	(United States) Jimmy Caruthers R										6							DNP		80
43	(United States) Jerry Karl	12	24	13	Wth	DNQ	11			DNQ		12					25		DNQ	65
44	(Canada) Ludwig Heimrath Sr.	23	14	23		DNQ		12		10										60
45	(United States) Ronnie Bucknum		16		15	DNQ	DNP			20							11			60
46	(United States) Dick Tobias R										19			8						50
47	(United States) Will Cagle R										21			DNQ	9	DNQ		DNQ		40
48	(United States) Arnie Knepper				DNQ	15			11		18	22		DNQ	DNQ	DNQ				40
49	(United States) Johnny Parsons					DNQ					16			12	**17**	18		DNQ	DNQ	10
50	(United States) Johnny Anderson	20																12		10
-	(United States) Mark Donohue		**25**		2					2			30							0
-	(Canada) John Cannon		11		DNQ					4			DNQ							0
-	(United States) Donnie Allison R				4															0
-	(United States) Peter Revson				22								5							0
-	(United States) LeeRoy Yarbrough				19								8							0
-	(United States) Jack Eiteljorg							10		DNQ										0
-	(United States) Ron Grable R									11										0
-	(Australia) Kevin Bartlett		12		DNQ			16					26							0
-	(United States) Ned Spath	14	17					13											DNQ	0
-	(United States) Larry Cannon R	DNQ		DNQ	Wth							18		13	DNQ	DNQ	16		DNQ	0
-	(Australia) Jack Brabham				13								DNQ							0
-	(United States) Darrell Dockery R	15	23	14	DNQ	23	23			DNQ									DNQ	0
-	(United States) Al Loquasto			24	DNQ		DNQ		14								23			0
-	(United States) John Martin R									15									DNQ	0
-	(United States) Al Miller				Wth				15											0
-	(United States) Bill Puterbaugh				DNQ						DNS		DNQ	DNQ	16	17				0
-	(United States) Sonny Ates				Wth	16														0
-	(United States) Salt Walther R					DNS												18		0
-	(United States) Jerry Poland R													DNQ	18	DNQ				0
-	(United States) Crockey Peterson R		19					20		DNQ										0
-	(United States) Scooter Patrick R									19										0
-	(United States) George Follmer				31					21			20							0
-	(United States) Bud Morley				Wth			21											DNQ	0
-	(Italy) Nick Dioguardi R	21																		0
-	(United States) Gig Stephens						22										26			0
-	(United States) Bob DeJong R		DNQ			DNQ		22					DNQ						DNQ	0
-	(United States) Don Brown R																24		DNQ	0
-	(United States) Jim Hurtubise				DNQ								32							0
-	(United States) Ron Burke													DNQ	DNQ	DNQ		DNS		0
-	(United States) Ed Marshall	DNQ	DNS																	0
-	(United States) Leigh Earnshaw													DNQ	DNQ	DNQ		DNQ		0
-	(United States) Jigger Sirois				DNQ								DNQ							0
-	(United States) Keith Rachwitz							DNQ											DNQ	0
-	(United States) Lee Kunzman				Wth	DNQ														0
-	(United States) Denny Zimmerman				DNQ								DNQ							0
-	(United States) Rollie Beale														DNQ	DNQ				0
-	(United States) Jim Reynard			DNQ													DNQ			0
-	(United States) Bob Gregg																		DNQ	0
-	(United States) Tony Adamowicz				DNQ															0
-	(United States) Sam Posey				DNQ															0
-	(United States) Charlie Glotzbach				Wth															0
-	(New Zealand) Chris Amon				Wth															0
-	(New Zealand) Denny Hulme				Wth															0
-	(Argentina) Carlos Pairetti				Wth															0
-	(United States) Bob Veith				Wth															0
-	(United States) Les Scott												DNQ							0
-	(United States) Gary Ponzini																	DNQ		0
-	(United States) Bob Allen																		DNQ	0
-	(United States) Tom Sneva																		DNQ	0
-	(United States) Dave Strickland																		DNQ	0
Pos	Driver	PHX1 (United States)	SON (United States)	TRE1 (United States)	INDY (United States)	MIL1 (United States)	LHS (United States)	CDR (United States)	MIS (United States)	IRP (United States)	SPR (United States)	MIL2 (United States)	ONT (United States)	DQSF (United States)	ISF (United States)	SED (United States)	TRE2 (United States)	CSF (United States)	PHX2 (United States)	Pts

Color	Result
Gold	Winner
Silver	2nd place
Bronze	3rd place
Green	4th & 5th place
Light Blue	6th-10th place
Dark Blue	Finished (Outside Top 10)
Purple	Did not finish (Ret)
Red	Did not qualify (DNQ)
Brown	Withdrawn (Wth)
Black	Disqualified (DSQ)
White	Did not start (DNS)
Blank	Did not participate (DNP)
Blank	Not competing

**In-line notation**
**Bold**	Pole position
Italics	Ran fastest race lap
*	Led most race laps
RY Rookie of the Year
R Rookie

== See also ==
- 1970 Indianapolis 500
