= 1994 Hooters 500 =

31st race of the 1994 NASCAR Winston Cup Series

Race details
- Race 31 of 31 in the 1994 NASCAR Winston Cup Series
- The 1994 Hooters 500 program cover, with artwork by Sam Bass.
- Date: November 12, 1994
- Official name: 35th Annual Hooters 500
- Location: Hampton, Georgia, Atlanta Motor Speedway
- Course: Permanent racing facility
- Course length: 1.522 miles (2.449 km)
- Distance: 328 laps, 499.216 mi (803.41 km)
- Scheduled distance: 328 laps, 499.216 mi (803.41 km)
- Average speed: 148.982 miles per hour (239.763 km/h)
- Attendance: 100,000

Pole position
Driver	Greg Sacks	U.S. Motorsports Inc.
- Time: 29.485

Most laps led
Driver	Mark Martin	Roush Racing
- Laps: 119

Winner
No. 6	Mark Martin	Roush Racing

Television in the United States
- Network: ESPN
- Announcers: Bob Jenkins, Ned Jarrett, Benny Parsons

Radio in the United States
- Radio: Performance Racing Network

The 1994 Hooters 500 was the 31st and final stock car race of the 1994 NASCAR Winston Cup Series season and the 35th iteration of the event. The race was held on Sunday, November 13, 1994, in Hampton, Georgia, at Atlanta Motor Speedway, a 1.522 miles (2.449 km) permanent asphalt oval intermediate speedway. The race took the scheduled 328 laps to complete. At race's end, Roush Racing driver Mark Martin would manage to dominate the late stages of the race to take his 14th career NASCAR Winston Cup Series victory and his second and final victory of the season. To fill out the top three, Richard Childress Racing driver Dale Earnhardt and Butch Mock Motorsports driver Todd Bodine would finish second and third, respectively.

The race marked the final Winston Cup Series start for long-time driver Harry Gant. Gant would retire from the race due to a burnt piston, finishing 33rd.

Earnhardt dedicated his season championship to Neil Bonnett who lost his life before the first race of the season.

== Background ==
The layout of Atlanta Motor Speedway, the circuit where the race was held.

Atlanta Motor Speedway (formerly Atlanta International Raceway) is a 1.522-mile race track in Hampton, Georgia, United States, 20 miles (32 km) south of Atlanta. It has annually hosted NASCAR Winston Cup Series stock car races since its inauguration in 1960.

The venue was bought by Speedway Motorsports in 1990. In 1994, 46 condominiums were built over the northeastern side of the track. In 1997, to standardize the track with Speedway Motorsports' other two intermediate ovals, the entire track was almost completely rebuilt. The frontstretch and backstretch were swapped, and the configuration of the track was changed from oval to quad-oval, with a new official length of 1.54-mile (2.48 km) where before it was 1.522-mile (2.449 km). The project made the track one of the fastest on the NASCAR circuit.

=== Entry list ===
- (R) - denotes rookie driver.

#	Driver	Team	Make
1	Rick Mast	Precision Products Racing	Ford
2	Rusty Wallace	Penske Racing South	Ford
02	Randy LaJoie	Taylor Racing	Ford
3	Dale Earnhardt	Richard Childress Racing	Chevrolet
4	Sterling Marlin	Morgan–McClure Motorsports	Chevrolet
5	Terry Labonte	Hendrick Motorsports	Chevrolet
6	Mark Martin	Roush Racing	Ford
7	Geoff Bodine	Geoff Bodine Racing	Ford
8	Jeff Burton (R)	Stavola Brothers Racing	Ford
10	Ricky Rudd	Rudd Performance Motorsports	Ford
11	Bill Elliott	Junior Johnson & Associates	Ford
12	Derrike Cope	Bobby Allison Motorsports	Ford
15	Lake Speed	Bud Moore Engineering	Ford
16	Ted Musgrave	Roush Racing	Ford
17	Darrell Waltrip	Darrell Waltrip Motorsports	Chevrolet
18	Dale Jarrett	Joe Gibbs Racing	Chevrolet
19	Loy Allen Jr. (R)	TriStar Motorsports	Ford
20	Bobby Hillin Jr.	Moroso Racing	Ford
21	Morgan Shepherd	Wood Brothers Racing	Ford
22	Bobby Labonte	Bill Davis Racing	Pontiac
23	Hut Stricklin	Travis Carter Enterprises	Ford
24	Jeff Gordon	Hendrick Motorsports	Chevrolet
25	Ken Schrader	Hendrick Motorsports	Chevrolet
26	Brett Bodine	King Racing	Ford
27	Jimmy Spencer	Junior Johnson & Associates	Ford
28	Ernie Irvan	Robert Yates Racing	Ford
29	Steve Grissom	Diamond Ridge Motorsports	Chevrolet
30	Michael Waltrip	Bahari Racing	Pontiac
31	Ward Burton	A.G. Dillard Motorsports	Chevrolet
32	Dick Trickle	Active Motorsports	Chevrolet
33	Harry Gant	Leo Jackson Motorsports	Chevrolet
34	Bob Brevak	Brevak Racing	Ford
35	Bill Venturini	Venturini Motorsports	Chevrolet
40	Bobby Hamilton	SABCO Racing	Pontiac
41	Joe Nemechek (R)	Larry Hedrick Motorsports	Chevrolet
42	Kyle Petty	SABCO Racing	Pontiac
43	John Andretti (R)	Petty Enterprises	Pontiac
44	Bobby Hillin Jr.	Charles Hardy Racing	Ford
45	Rich Bickle (R)	Terminal Trucking Motorsports	Ford
47	Billy Standridge (R)	Johnson Standridge Racing	Ford
50	Brian Bonner	A. J. Foyt Racing	Ford
52	Gary Bradberry	Jimmy Means Racing	Ford
53	Brad Teague	Jimmy Means Racing	Ford
54	Robert Pressley	Leo Jackson Motorsports	Chevrolet
55	Tim Fedewa	RaDiUs Motorsports	Ford
61	Rick Carelli	Chesrown Racing	Chevrolet
64	Gary Wright	White Racing	Chevrolet
67	Ken Bouchard	Cunningham Racing	Ford
71	Dave Marcis	Marcis Auto Racing	Chevrolet
75	Todd Bodine	Butch Mock Motorsports	Ford
77	Greg Sacks	U.S. Motorsports Inc.	Ford
78	Pancho Carter	Triad Motorsports	Ford
80	Joe Ruttman	Hover Motorsports	Ford
90	Mike Wallace (R)	Donlavey Racing	Ford
97	Jeff Green	Junior Johnson & Associates	Ford
98	Jeremy Mayfield (R)	Cale Yarborough Motorsports	Ford

== Qualifying ==
Qualifying was split into two rounds. The first round was held on Friday, November 11, at 2:00 PM EST. Each driver would have one lap to set a time. During the first round, the top 20 drivers in the round would be guaranteed a starting spot in the race. If a driver was not able to guarantee a spot in the first round, they had the option to scrub their time from the first round and try and run a faster lap time in a second round qualifying run, held on Saturday, November 12, at 11:00 AM EST. As with the first round, each driver would have one lap to set a time. For this specific race, positions 21-40 would be decided on time, and depending on who needed it, a select amount of positions were given to cars who had not otherwise qualified but were high enough in owner's points; up to two provisionals were given. If needed, a past champion who did not qualify on either time or provisionals could use a champion's provisional, adding one more spot to the field.

Greg Sacks, driving for U.S. Motorsports Inc., won the pole, setting a time of 29.485 and an average speed of 185.830 mph (299.064 km/h) in the first round.

13 drivers would fail to qualify.

=== Full qualifying results ===
Pos.	#	Driver	Team	Make	Time	Speed
1	77	Greg Sacks	U.S. Motorsports Inc.	Ford	29.485	185.830
2	28	Kenny Wallace	Robert Yates Racing	Ford	29.658	184.746
3	12	Derrike Cope	Bobby Allison Motorsports	Ford	29.791	183.921
4	7	Geoff Bodine	Geoff Bodine Racing	Ford	29.793	183.909
5	6	Mark Martin	Roush Racing	Ford	29.821	183.736
6	24	Jeff Gordon	Hendrick Motorsports	Chevrolet	29.859	183.502
7	41	Joe Nemechek (R)	Larry Hedrick Motorsports	Chevrolet	29.878	183.386
8	10	Ricky Rudd	Rudd Performance Motorsports	Ford	29.905	183.220
9	43	John Andretti (R)	Petty GMS Motorsports	Pontiac	29.917	183.147
10	5	Terry Labonte	Hendrick Motorsports	Chevrolet	29.920	183.128
11	22	Bobby Labonte	Bill Davis Racing	Pontiac	29.927	183.086
12	52	Gary Bradberry	Jimmy Means Racing	Ford	29.971	182.817
13	4	Sterling Marlin	Morgan–McClure Motorsports	Chevrolet	30.032	182.445
14	26	Brett Bodine	King Racing	Ford	30.098	182.047
15	02	Randy LaJoie	Taylor Racing	Ford	30.040	182.397
16	17	Darrell Waltrip	Darrell Waltrip Motorsports	Chevrolet	30.044	182.373
17	19	Loy Allen Jr. (R)	TriStar Motorsports	Ford	30.060	182.275
18	2	Rusty Wallace	Penske Racing South	Ford	30.088	182.106
19	8	Jeff Burton (R)	Stavola Brothers Racing	Ford	30.099	182.039
20	15	Lake Speed	Bud Moore Engineering	Ford	30.115	181.943
Failed to lock in Round 1
21	16	Ted Musgrave	Roush Racing	Ford	30.009	182.585
22	78	Pancho Carter	Triad Motorsports	Ford	30.034	185.433
23	18	Dale Jarrett	Joe Gibbs Racing	Chevrolet	30.092	182.082
24	1	Rick Mast	Precision Products Racing	Ford	30.098	182.045
25	27	Jimmy Spencer	Junior Johnson & Associates	Ford	30.126	181.876
26	31	Ward Burton (R)	A.G. Dillard Motorsports	Chevrolet	30.168	181.623
27	30	Michael Waltrip	Bahari Racing	Pontiac	30.172	181.599
28	33	Harry Gant	Leo Jackson Motorsports	Chevrolet	30.187	181.509
29	29	Steve Grissom (R)	Diamond Ridge Motorsports	Chevrolet	30.195	181.461
30	3	Dale Earnhardt	Richard Childress Racing	Chevrolet	30.236	181.214
31	97	Jeff Green	Junior Johnson & Associates	Ford	30.245	181.161
32	20	Bobby Hillin Jr.	Moroso Racing	Ford	30.249	181.137
33	21	Morgan Shepherd	Wood Brothers Racing	Ford	30.252	181.119
34	90	Mike Wallace (R)	Donlavey Racing	Ford	30.257	181.089
35	54	Robert Pressley	Leo Jackson Motorsports	Chevrolet	30.263	181.053
36	75	Todd Bodine	Butch Mock Motorsports	Ford	30.265	181.041
37	44	Jimmy Hensley	Charles Hardy Racing	Ford	30.271	181.005
38	25	Ken Schrader	Hendrick Motorsports	Chevrolet	30.277	180.969
39	23	Hut Stricklin	Travis Carter Enterprises	Ford	30.280	180.951
40	67	Ken Bouchard	Cunningham Racing	Ford	30.307	180.790
Provisionals
41	42	Kyle Petty	SABCO Racing	Pontiac	-*	-*
42	40	Bobby Hamilton	SABCO Racing	Pontiac	-*	-*
Champion's Provisional
43	11	Bill Elliott	Junior Johnson & Associates	Ford	-*	-*
Failed to qualify
44	55	Tim Fedewa	RaDiUs Motorsports	Ford	-*	-*
45	98	Jeremy Mayfield (R)	Cale Yarborough Motorsports	Ford	-*	-*
46	64	Gary Wright	White Racing	Chevrolet	-*	-*
47	47	Billy Standridge (R)	Johnson Standridge Racing	Ford	-*	-*
48	32	Dick Trickle	Active Motorsports	Chevrolet	-*	-*
49	45	Rich Bickle (R)	Terminal Trucking Motorsports	Ford	-*	-*
50	71	Dave Marcis	Marcis Auto Racing	Chevrolet	-*	-*
51	80	Joe Ruttman	Hover Motorsports	Ford	-*	-*
52	35	Bill Venturini	Venturini Motorsports	Chevrolet	-*	-*
53	53	Brad Teague	Jimmy Means Racing	Ford	-*	-*
54	61	Rick Carelli	Chesrown Racing	Chevrolet	-*	-*
55	34	Bob Brevak	Brevak Racing	Ford	-*	-*
56	50	Brian Bonner	A. J. Foyt Racing	Ford	-*	-*
Official first round qualifying results
Official starting lineup

== Race results ==
Fin	St	#	Driver	Team	Make	Laps	Led	Status	Pts	Winnings
1	5	6	Mark Martin	Roush Racing	Ford	328	119	running	185	$104,200
2	30	3	Dale Earnhardt	Richard Childress Racing	Chevrolet	328	17	running	175	$55,950
3	36	75	Todd Bodine	Butch Mock Motorsports	Ford	328	41	running	170	$44,000
4	20	15	Lake Speed	Bud Moore Engineering	Ford	328	20	running	165	$32,000
5	34	90	Mike Wallace (R)	Donlavey Racing	Ford	328	13	running	160	$23,800
6	33	21	Morgan Shepherd	Wood Brothers Racing	Ford	328	0	running	150	$24,100
7	3	12	Derrike Cope	Bobby Allison Motorsports	Ford	327	4	running	151	$21,030
8	10	5	Terry Labonte	Hendrick Motorsports	Chevrolet	326	0	running	142	$22,550
9	23	18	Dale Jarrett	Joe Gibbs Racing	Chevrolet	326	0	running	138	$23,325
10	27	30	Michael Waltrip	Bahari Racing	Pontiac	326	0	running	134	$21,200
11	38	25	Ken Schrader	Hendrick Motorsports	Chevrolet	326	0	running	130	$18,375
12	37	44	Jimmy Hensley	Charles Hardy Racing	Ford	325	2	running	132	$10,950
13	9	43	John Andretti (R)	Petty GMS Motorsports	Pontiac	325	9	running	129	$15,025
14	8	10	Ricky Rudd	Rudd Performance Motorsports	Ford	324	0	running	121	$17,200
15	6	24	Jeff Gordon	Hendrick Motorsports	Chevrolet	323	0	running	118	$20,125
16	39	23	Hut Stricklin	Travis Carter Enterprises	Ford	323	0	running	115	$12,450
17	22	78	Pancho Carter	Triad Motorsports	Ford	322	0	running	112	$9,130
18	31	97	Jeff Green	Junior Johnson & Associates	Ford	321	0	running	109	$8,815
19	15	02	Randy LaJoie	Taylor Racing	Ford	318	0	running	106	$8,575
20	25	27	Jimmy Spencer	Junior Johnson & Associates	Ford	315	0	running	103	$11,710
21	16	17	Darrell Waltrip	Darrell Waltrip Motorsports	Chevrolet	313	0	running	100	$10,745
22	41	42	Kyle Petty	SABCO Racing	Pontiac	307	0	running	97	$18,730
23	7	41	Joe Nemechek (R)	Larry Hedrick Motorsports	Chevrolet	299	0	running	94	$10,115
24	42	40	Bobby Hamilton	SABCO Racing	Pontiac	296	0	running	91	$13,800
25	2	28	Kenny Wallace	Robert Yates Racing	Ford	292	0	running	88	$18,685
26	29	29	Steve Grissom (R)	Diamond Ridge Motorsports	Chevrolet	290	0	running	85	$9,370
27	24	1	Rick Mast	Precision Products Racing	Ford	288	9	running	87	$14,055
28	21	16	Ted Musgrave	Roush Racing	Ford	287	0	timing chain	79	$14,940
29	40	67	Ken Bouchard	Cunningham Racing	Ford	280	0	valve	76	$6,675
30	12	52	Gary Bradberry	Jimmy Means Racing	Ford	276	0	running	73	$6,600
31	19	8	Jeff Burton (R)	Stavola Brothers Racing	Ford	275	0	running	70	$12,635
32	18	2	Rusty Wallace	Penske Racing South	Ford	263	0	running	67	$17,670
33	28	33	Harry Gant	Leo Jackson Motorsports	Chevrolet	257	0	oil pan	64	$12,405
34	4	7	Geoff Bodine	Geoff Bodine Racing	Ford	247	34	crash	66	$16,740
35	35	54	Robert Pressley	Leo Jackson Motorsports	Chevrolet	222	0	running	58	$6,275
36	14	26	Brett Bodine	King Racing	Ford	211	8	engine	60	$12,510
37	11	22	Bobby Labonte	Bill Davis Racing	Pontiac	211	0	running	52	$10,170
38	43	11	Bill Elliott	Junior Johnson & Associates	Ford	203	0	oil pump	49	$10,140
39	1	77	Greg Sacks	U.S. Motorsports Inc.	Ford	161	24	vibration	51	$18,515
40	13	4	Sterling Marlin	Morgan–McClure Motorsports	Chevrolet	155	0	engine	43	$16,100
41	26	31	Ward Burton (R)	A.G. Dillard Motorsports	Chevrolet	154	28	valve	45	$8,900
42	17	19	Loy Allen Jr. (R)	TriStar Motorsports	Ford	109	0	crash	37	$6,100
43	32	20	Bobby Hillin Jr.	Moroso Racing	Ford	89	0	engine	34	$6,100
Official race results

== Standings after the race ==
Drivers' Championship standings

	Pos	Driver	Points
	1	Dale Earnhardt	4,694
1	2	Mark Martin	4,250 (-444)
1	3	Rusty Wallace	4,207 (-487)
	4	Ken Schrader	4,060 (–634)
	5	Ricky Rudd	4,050 (–644)
	6	Morgan Shepherd	4,029 (–665)
	7	Terry Labonte	3,876 (–818)
	8	Bill Elliott	3,776 (–918)
	9	Jeff Gordon	3,688 (–1,006)
	10	Darrell Waltrip	3,617 (–1,077)
Official driver's standings

- Note: Only the first 10 positions are included for the driver standings.

Previous race: 1994 Slick 50 500	NASCAR Winston Cup Series; 1994 season	Next race: 1995 Daytona 500
