= George Snider =

American racing driver (born 1940)

- Born: December 8, 1940 (age 85) Bakersfield, California, U.S.

Champ Car career
- 142 races run over 28 years
- Best finish: 1st (1981-82)
- First race: 1964 Bobby Ball Memorial (Phoenix)
- Last race: 1992 Michigan 500 (Michigan)
- First win: 1981 Tony Bettenhausen 100 (Springfield)
Wins	Podiums	Poles
1	9	0

USAC Silver Crown Series career
- Debut season: 1971
- Starts: 191
- Championships: 1 (1971)
- Wins: 7
- Podiums: 9
- Poles: 1
- Best finish: 1st in 1971

George Lee Snider III (born December 8, 1940, in Bakersfield, California) is a retired American race car driver. A longtime driver in the United States Automobile Club Silver Crown series, Snider is also a 22-time starter of the Indianapolis 500, tied for the most starts without winning the race. His best finish was eighth in the 1975 Indianapolis 500. Snider made many starts driving for his good friend A. J. Foyt. His last Indy start was in 1987. Snider is known to many fans by his nickname "Ziggy".

Snider is the 1971 USAC Silver Crown Champion and the 1981-1982 USAC Champ Car Champion, the last "big car" championship to include pavement races other than the Indy 500.

Snider owns Silver Crown race cars and, in 2005, allowed Foyt's grandson A. J. Foyt IV to race a car at the Milwaukee Mile.

Snider is currently a partner in ownership of non wing 360ci and 410ci sprint car teams in California (BUSTER AND ZIGGY RACING). Peter Murphy (originally from Australia now residing in Fresno, CA) currently drives their 360ci non wing sprint car in USAC West Coast 360 competition. Bud Kaeding (multi time USAC champion and Oval Nationals champion) drove the 410ci sprint car for the team on August 14, 2010, at Santa Maria Speedway in a USAC/CRA racing event where he placed third.

== Awards ==
- He was inducted in the West Coast Stock Car Hall of Fame in 2021.

== Complete USAC Championship Car results ==
Year	1	2	3	4	5	6	7	8	9	10	11	12	13	14	15	16	17	18	19	20	21	22	23	24	25	26	27	28	Pos	Points
1964	PHX	TRE	INDY	MIL	LAN	TRE	SPR	MIL	DUQ	ISF	TRE	SAC	PHX; 9																39th	80
1965	PHX; 23	TRE	INDY; 21	MIL; DNQ	LAN; 16	PPR	TRE; 9	IRP; 9	ATL; 25	LAN; 7	MIL	ISF; 2	MIL	DSF; 14	INF; 8	TRE; 10	SAC; 15	PHX; DNQ											21st	453
1966	PHX; 6	TRE	INDY; 19	MIL; 10	LAN; 21	ATL; DNQ	PIP	IRP; 6	LAN; 11	SPR; 6	MIL; 10	DUQ; DNQ	ISF; 12	TRE; DNP	SAC; 11	PHX													19th	365
1967	PHX; 21	TRE	INDY; 26	MIL; 18	LAN; DNQ	PIP	MOS	MOS	IRP; DNQ	LAN	MTR	MTR	SPR; 18	MIL; DNQ	DUQ; 16	ISF; 17	TRE; DNQ	SAC; 3	HAN; 22	PHX	RIV								30th	140
1968	HAN; 9	LVG; 5	PHX; 6	TRE; 6	INDY; 31	MIL; 8	MOS	MOS	LAN	PIP	CDR	NAZ; 8	IRP	IRP	LAN	LAN	MTR	MTR	SPR; 3	MIL	DUQ; 10	ISF; 3	TRE; DNQ	SAC; 13	MCH	HAN	PHX; 3	RIV; DNP	16th	919
1969	PHX	HAN; 14	INDY; 16	MIL; DNQ	LAN; 9	PIP	CDR	NAZ	TRE; 5	IRP; 20	IRP	MIL; 25	SPR; 2	DOV	DUQ; 7	ISF; 7	BRN; DNQ	BRN	TRE; 5	SAC; DNQ	KEN	KEN	PHX; 26	RIV; 18					17th	840
1970	PHX; 7	SON	TRE	INDY; 20	MIL	LAN	CDR	MCH; 23	IRP; 23	SPR; 14	MIL	ONT; DNQ	DUQ; 4	ISF; 14	SED; 15	TRE; 18	SAC; 2	PHX; 7											21st	460
1971	RAF	RAF	PHX; 18	TRE	INDY; 33	MIL; 21	POC; 33	MCH; 14	MIL; 5	ONT; 32	TRE; 14	PHX; 15																	29th	200
1972	PHX; 16	TRE; DNQ	INDY; 11	MIL; 23	MCH; 6	POC; 21	MIL; 18	ONT; 8	TRE; 10	PHX; 10																			16th	517
1973	TWS	TRE	TRE	INDY; 12	MIL	POC; 25	MCH	MIL	ONT	ONT	ONT; 14	MCH	MCH	TRE	TWS	PHX; 12													32nd	29
1974	ONT	ONT; 10	ONT; 11	PHX; 17	TRE	INDY; 28	MIL	POC; 25	MCH	MIL	MCH; 16	TRE	TRE	PHX															29th	130
1975	ONT; DNS	ONT	ONT; 20	PHX; 18	TRE	INDY; 8	MIL	POC; 10	MCH; 22	MIL	MCH	TRE	PHX																18th	400
1976	PHX	TRE	INDY; 13	MIL	POC; 9	MCH	TWS	TRE	MIL	ONT	MCH; 22	TWS; 7	PHX; 10																19th	365
1977	ONT	PHX	TWS	TRE	INDY; 24	MIL	POC; 33	MOS	MCH; DNQ	TWS; 20	MIL	ONT; 32	MCH; 21	PHX; 10															40th	45
1978	PHX	ONT	TWS	TRE	INDY; 8	MOS	MIL	POC; 6	MCH; 15	ATL	TWS; DNS	MIL	ONT; 27	MCH	TRE	SIL; 11	BRH; 8	PHX; 20											15th	766
1979	ONT; 8	TWS; 5	INDY; 33	MIL; 18	POC; 25	TWS	MIL; 11																						14th	361
1980	ONT	INDY; 15	MIL	POC; DNQ	MOH																								44th	25
1981-82	INDY; DNQ^{1}	POC; 4	ILL; 1	DUQ; 3	ISF; 8	INDY; 21																							1st	1,395
1982-83	ISF	DSF; 15	NAZ; 9	INDY; 32																									19th	95
1983-84	DUQ; 4	INDY; 11																											8th	340

- ^{1}: At the 1981 Indianapolis 500, Snider initially qualified 29th, but the sold the car to Tim Richmond. Richmond drove the car on race day.

== Complete PPG Indy Car Series results ==
Year	Team	1	2	3	4	5	6	7	8	9	10	11	12	13	14	15	16	17	Pos.	Pts	Ref
1979	Hoffman Racing	PHX	ATL	ATL	INDY; 33	TRE	TRE	MCH	MCH	WGL	TRE	ONT	MCH	ATL	PHX				-	0	
1980	Gilmore Racing	ONT	INDY; 15	MIL	POC; DNQ	MOH	MCH	WGL	MIL	ONT	MCH	MEX	PHX						48th	25	
1982		PHX	ATL	MIL	CLE	MCH; 19	MIL	POC; 21	RIV	ROA	MCH	PHX							40th	3	
1983		ATL	INDY; 32	MIL	CLE	MCH	ROA	POC	RIV	MOH	MCH	CPL	LAG	PHX					59th	0	
1984	Gilmore Racing	LBH	PHX	INDY; 11	MIL	POR	MEA	CLE	MCH	ROA	POC	MOH	SAN	MCH	PHX	LAG	CPL		38th	2	
1985	Gilmore Racing	LBH	INDY; 32	MIL	POR	MEA	CLE	MCH	ROA	POC	MOH	SAN	MCH	LAG	PHX	MIA			60th	0	
1986	A. J. Foyt Enterprises	PHX	LBH	INDY; 26	MIL	POR	MEA	CLE	TOR	MCH; 27	POC	MOH	SAN	MCH	ROA	LAG	PHX	MIA	48th	0	
1987	A. J. Foyt Enterprises	LBH	PHX	INDY; 33	MIL	POR	MEA	CLE	TOR	MCH	POC	ROA	MOH	NAZ	LAG	MIA			50th	0	
1988	Calumet Farms	PHX	LBH	INDY; DNQ	MIL	POR	CLE	TOR	MEA	MCH	POC	MOH	ROA	NAZ	LAG	MIA			-	0	
1990		PHX	LBH	INDY; DNQ	MIL	DET	POR	CLE	MEA	TOR	MCH	DEN	VAN	MOH	ROA	NAZ	LAG		-	0	
1992	Gilmore Racing	SRF	PHX; 22	LBH	INDY	DET	POR	MIL	NHA	TOR									53rd	0	
1992	Euromotorsport										MCH; 24	CLE	ROA	VAN	MOH	NAZ	LAG		53rd	0	

== Indianapolis 500 results ==
Year	Chassis	Engine	Start	Finish
1965	Gerhardt	Offy	16th	21st
1966	Lotus	Ford	3rd	19th
1967	Mongoose	Ford	10th	28th
1968	Mongoose	Ford	29th	31st
1969	Coyote	Ford	15th	16th
1970	Coyote	Ford	10th	20th
1971	Eagle	Offy	21st	33rd
1972	Coyote	Foyt	21st	11th
1973	Coyote	Foyt	30th	12th
1974	Atlanta	Foyt	13th	28th
1975	Eagle	Offy	24th	8th
1976	Eagle	Offy	27th	13th
1977	Wildcat	DGS	13th	24th
1978	Coyote	Foyt	23rd	8th
1979	Lightning	Offy	35th	33rd
1980	Parnelli	Cosworth	21st	15th
1981	Parnelli	Cosworth	29th	DNS
1982	March	Cosworth	26th	21st
1983	March	Cosworth	13th	32nd
1984	March	Cosworth	31st	11th
1985	March	Chevrolet	28th	32nd
1986	March	Cosworth	31st	26th
1987	March	Chevrolet	31st	33rd
1988	March	Chevrolet	DNQ	
1990	Lola	Buick	DNQ	
