= Eisert =

Eisert (North German: from a shortening of the ancient Germanic personal name Isenhart composed of the elements īsan "iron" + hard "hardy, brave, strong".) is a German surname. Notable people with the surname include:

- Brandon Eisert (born 1998), American professional baseball player
- Jens Eisert (born 1970), German physicist
- Sandra Eisert (born 1952), American photojournalist, now an art director and picture editor

== See also ==
- The dictionary definition of Eisert at Wiktionary
