= 1992 Indianapolis 500 =

American motor race

76th Indianapolis 500

Indianapolis Motor Speedway

Indianapolis 500
- Sanctioning body: United States Auto Club
- Season: 1992 PPG Indy Car World Series; 1991–92 USAC Gold Crown Championship
- Date: May 24, 1992
- Winner: (United States) Al Unser Jr.
- Winning team: Galles-Kraco Racing
- Winning Chief Mechanic: Owen Snyder III
- Time of race: 3:43:04.991
- Average speed: 134.477 mph (216.420 km/h)
- Pole position: (Colombia) Roberto Guerrero
- Pole speed: 232.482 mph (374.144 km/h)
- Fastest qualifier: (Colombia) Roberto Guerrero
- Rookie of the Year: (United States) Lyn St. James
- Most laps led: (United States) Michael Andretti (160)

Pre-race ceremonies
- National anthem: Sandi Patti
- "Back Home Again in Indiana": Jim Nabors
- Starting command: Mary F. Hulman
- Pace car: Cadillac Allanté
- Pace car driver: Bobby Unser
- Starter: Duane Sweeney
- Estimated attendance: 400,000

Television in the United States
- Network: ABC
- Announcers: Host/Lap-by-lap: Paul Page; Color Analyst: Sam Posey; Color Analyst: Bobby Unser
- Nielsen ratings: 9.8 / 31

Chronology
Previous	Next
1991	1993

The 1992 Indianapolis 500 (officially known as the 76th Annual Indianapolis 500-Mile Race) was a United States Auto Club (USAC) open-wheel race that was held at the Indianapolis Motor Speedway in Speedway, Indiana, on Sunday, May 24, 1992, before 400,000 spectators. It was the 76th running of the Indianapolis 500 and the 35th under USAC sanctioning. It counted as the fourth race of IndyCar's 1992 PPG Indy Car World Series and the sole race of USAC's 1991–92 USAC Gold Crown Championship.

The race is famous for the fierce battle in the closing laps, as race winner Al Unser Jr. held off second place Scott Goodyear for the victory by 0.043 seconds, the second-closest finish in Indy history. Unser Jr. became the first second-generation driver to win the Indy 500, following in the footsteps of his father Al Unser Sr. He also became the third member of the famous Unser family to win the race. A race-record ten former winners were in the starting lineup, and with Unser a first time winner, by day's end the field totaled eleven. Lyn St. James became the second female driver to qualify for the Indianapolis 500 (after Janet Guthrie). She finished 11th, the only rookie running at the finish, and was voted Rookie of the Year.

Cold temperatures and high winds turned the race into a crash-filled, marathon day. The tone for the race was set early when pole position winner Roberto Guerrero spun out and crashed on the parade lap. The race was dominated by Michael Andretti in the debut of the Ford-Cosworth XB engine. Andretti grabbed the lead at the start from 6th starting position on the grid. He led 160 of the first 189 laps and was 30 seconds out in front when his fuel pump suddenly failed with eleven laps to go. Andretti's car coasted to a stop and he placed 13th.

Thirteen cars were eliminated in crashes during the race, and several other serious wrecks occurred during practice. Former Formula One World Champion Nelson Piquet suffered serious leg injuries in a crash on May 7. Pancho Carter and Hiro Matsushita suffered broken bones in separate crashes, and rookie Jovy Marcelo was fatally injured in a practice crash on May 15. Defending winner Rick Mears crashed during practice and during the race, while Jeff Andretti experienced the worst crash during the race itself, suffering serious injuries to his legs and feet.

Following the race, sweeping changes came about at the track, largely in the interest of safety. In addition, a noticeable "changing of the guard" followed, as the 1992 race signaled the final race for several Indy legends, including A. J. Foyt, Rick Mears, Tom Sneva, and Gordon Johncock.

The race was sanctioned by USAC, and was included as part of the 1992 CART PPG Indy Car World Series. Unser's victory was considered by some an "upset," as his somewhat inauspicious Galmer chassis was not expected to excel on ovals, and its first generation "Chevy-A" engine was starting to become a lame duck powerplant in the series. It was a long-awaited victory for Unser, who was making his tenth Indy 500 attempt. Unser, the 1990 CART champion, had recently confided with Paul Page that he was afraid he may never win the 500.

== Offseason ==
A busy offseason began at the conclusion of the 1991 season. The biggest announcement was the return of Ford to Indy car competition. The Ford Cosworth XB engine was introduced to replace the aging DFX and the lesser-used DFS. It quickly became an engine of choice, and for 1992, was the powerplant for Newman/Haas Racing and Chip Ganassi Racing. For the 1992 season, Ilmor introduced an updated motor (the 265-B), badged and commonly known as the "Chevy-B". This new engine was fielded singly by Penske Racing (Rick Mears & Emerson Fittipaldi). The rest of the Ilmor-Chevrolet teams utilized the existing 265-A, now being referred to as the "Chevy-A".

Galles-Kraco Racing unveiled their new Galmer chassis for 1992. It met with instant success as Al Unser Jr. won the pole position for the season opener at Surfers Paradise and finished 4th. Teammate Danny Sullivan won a few weeks later at Long Beach, with Unser Jr. 4th in that same race. The chassis was expected to excel on street and road courses, but there were some doubts about its oval track capabilities. Unser Jr. managed a 4th place at Phoenix, but both drivers entered the month of May at Indy with mixed expectations. Truesports fielded their own in-house "All American" chassis for the second year in a row, this time designated the Truesports 92C, and powered by the Chevy-A. Previously Truesports had been utilizing the Judd engine.

Team and driver switches for 1992 included most notably Bobby Rahal and Danny Sullivan, who essentially swapped rides with one other at Galles-Kraco Racing and Patrick Racing, respectively. In December 1991, however, Pat Patrick sold the assets of Patrick Racing to Rahal and his partner Carl Hogan. The team became known as Rahal-Hogan Racing. Right off the bat, Rahal scored a victory for the re-organized team. He won the second race of the season at Phoenix, leading wire-to-wire.

Rookie driver Paul Tracy continued into his second year with Penske, and was offered his first attempt at Indy with the team. Arie Luyendyk, out of a ride after the shuttering of the UNO Granatelli team (and the former Doug Shierson Racing), landed a part-time ride with Ganassi for Indy and Michigan. After much fanfare of a pending retirement in 1991, A. J. Foyt brushed off the idea, and returned to the cockpit. He raced in the 1992 Daytona 500, and entered as a driver for Indianapolis. It would be his record 35th consecutive Indy 500 start. A crash earlier in the season at Phoenix left him with a fractured shoulder, but it would be only a minor setback.

=== Testing ===
During testing in March and April, King Racing set the early pace. On March 28, Roberto Guerrero became the first driver to run a test lap over 230 mph. Teammate Jim Crawford also ran a 230 mph lap. The Indy car testing was accompanied by a concurrent IROC feasibility test. Track management was at the time exploring the possibility of holding a stock car or IROC event at the circuit.

Goodyear arrived at the Speedway sporting a slightly new look. The logos on the tires were painted in yellow. This coincided with a change in signage for Goodyear in American auto racing, as the company brought back their classic blue and yellow logo scheme for motorsports.

=== Rule changes ===
For 1992, new pit rules were implemented by USAC. At the onset of a caution flag, the pit road was immediately closed, and cars were required to pack up behind the pace car first. The next time around, if officials deemed the field was properly bunched up, the pits would open for all competitors. In addition, a 100 mph speed limit was applied to the pits during caution periods. These rules reflected regulations that NASCAR had experimented with in 1991, and were in the interest of safety for drivers and crew members.

== Race schedule ==
Race schedule — April/May 1992
Sun	Mon	Tue	Wed	Thu	Fri	Sat
19	20	21	22	23	24; ROP	25; ROP
26; ROP	27	28	29	30	1	2 Practice
3 Practice	4 Practice	5 Practice	6 Practice	7 Practice	8 Practice	9 Pole Day
10; Time Trials	11; Practice	12; Practice	13; Practice	14; Practice	15; Practice	16; Time Trials
17; Bump Day	18	19	20	21; Carb Day	22; Mini-Marathon	23; Parade
24; Indy 500	25; Memorial Day	26	27	28	29	30
31						

Color	Notes
Green	Practice
Dark Blue	Time trials
Silver	Race day
Red	Rained out*
Blank	No track activity

* Includes days where track
activity was significantly
limited due to rain

ROP — denotes Rookie
Orientation Program

== Practice – week 1 ==
=== Saturday May 2 ===
King Racing teammates Jim Crawford and Roberto Guerrero quickly established themselves as the cars to beat during the first week of practice. The two drivers fielded a pair of Lola V-6 Buicks, an engine that many thought was finally beginning to show its potential after years of development. On opening day, Crawford broke the unofficial track record with a lap of 229.609 mph. Several rookies finished their rookie tests, including Paul Tracy, Jimmy Vasser, Lyn St. James, and the most noteworthy of the rookies, former Formula One world champion Nelson Piquet.

=== Sunday May 3 ===
Fabrizio Barbazza crashed in turn 1 midway through the day during a refresher test. He was not injured. Late in the day, Al Unser Jr., driving the new Galmer chassis, blew a motor. Michael Andretti led the speed chart for the afternoon at 226.187 mph.

=== Monday May 4 ===
Roberto Guerrero upped the speed for the month, becoming the first driver to practice over 230 mph at the Speedway. His lap of 230.432 mph early in the session, however, lasted only a couple hours. Teammate Jim Crawford upped the speed, and by the end of the day, posted a 233.433 mph lap. Meanwhile, Nelson Piquet was comfortably getting up to speed, running a top lap of 226.809 mph.

=== Tuesday May 5 ===
Several incidents occurred on Tuesday, during a cool, windy day. Scott Brayton, Buddy Lazier, and Paul Tracy each suffered separate spins/crashes. Rookie Lyn St. James was finding speed difficult, running a 217.097 mph, her fastest lap of the month, nowhere near the top of the charts. Guerrero continued King Racing's dominance, turning in another 230 mph practice lap.

=== Wednesday May 6 ===
Crawford and Guerrero led the speed chart once again, with Crawford over 233 mph for the second time. The biggest story of the day, however, was the massive crash by Rick Mears. Late in the afternoon, Mears entered turn two, and a fluid leak sprayed water over the back wheels. The car broke out into a spin, and he crashed hard into the wall in turn two. The car flipped over and remained upside down while sliding down the backstretch. Mears suffered a minor foot fracture and an injury to his wrist.

=== Thursday May 7 ===
The second major crash in two days occurred, this time involving Nelson Piquet. In turn four, Piquet's car did a reverse spin, and hit the wall head-on with the nose. Piquet suffered serious injuries to both legs, and was immediately admitted to the hospital for surgery. Piquet withdrew and would require nearly a year of rehabilitation. Piquet had been acclimating himself quite well to the Speedway, but was reportedly frustrated with the frequency of caution lights during the practice sessions. A metal piece of debris was reported on the backstretch, prompting USAC to turn on the yellow. Piquet, in the middle of a "hot lap", momentarily ignored the yellow light, and raced through turn three and the north chute. In turn four, he lifted off the throttle quickly to enter the pits, at which time the car snapped out of control.

Roberto Guerrero was back at the top of the speed chart, running his fastest lap of the month, 232.624 mph.

=== "Fast" Friday May 8 ===
The final day of practice before the run for the pole position saw four drivers over 231 mph. Mario Andretti led the chart for the day, at 233.202 mph. Arie Luyendyk was second, while Crawford and Guerrero were close behind. Al Unser Sr. was named as a replacement for Nelson Piquet's entry, and Gary Bettenhausen suffered damage when his engine blew, causing a lazy spin in turn 1. This would cause the team to take the car originally meant for Unser Sr & instead use it for Gary, meaning Unser would have to qualify during the second weekend of time trials.

== Time trials – weekend 1 ==
=== Pole Day – Saturday May 9 ===
Rain kept the cars off the track until noon, and persistent "weepers" plagued the rest of the afternoon. During the first practice session, Jim Crawford's hopes for a pole position suffered a setback when he blew an engine and spun. Several yellows for moisture and debris dragged out the mandatory 60-minute practice session until 3:15 p.m. Roberto Guerrero (232.090 mph) set the fastest practice lap of the day.

Qualifying finally began at 4 p.m. Arie Luyendyk was the first car out, and he did not disappoint. He set a new one-lap track record of 229.305 mph, and grabbed the provisional pole position with a four-lap record of 229.127 mph. A hectic round of time trials followed, as drivers scrambled for their shot at qualifying before the 6 p.m. gun. At 4:50 p.m., Gary Bettenhausen set a one-lap record of 229.317 mph, but his four-lap record was shy of the pole. Among the other drivers securing a starting position were Bobby Rahal, Emerson Fittipaldi, Paul Tracy, and Al Unser Jr. Scott Goodyear also put a Walker Racing team car in the field, taking a run of 219.054 mph.

At 5:34 p.m., Roberto Guerrero took to the track. He set all-new one-lap and four-lap track records on his way to winning the pole position.

- Lap 1 – 38.762 seconds, 232.186 mph (new 1-lap track record)
- Lap 2 – 38.707 seconds, 232.516 mph (new 1-lap track record)
- Lap 3 – 38.690 seconds, 232.618 mph (new 1-lap track record)
- Lap 4 – 38.692 seconds, 232.606 mph
- Total – 2:34.851, 232.482 mph (new 4-lap track record)

After taking the checkered flag, Guerrero ran out of fuel, and the car stalled on the backstretch. The next car out to qualify was Danny Sullivan, who had already been dispatched by the officials from the pits. The resulting yellow light condition halted qualifying for several minutes. Sullivan was forced to return to the pits, refuel, and get back in the qualifying line.

After Guerrero was towed back to the pits, Rick Mears took to the track, shaking off his accident earlier in the week. Mario Andretti squeezed himself onto the front row, with one lap over 230 mph. A. J. Foyt was the final car to make it out on the track for the day. After three laps in the 226 mph range, his engine quit on the final lap, and Foyt aborted the run.

Since the original qualifying order had not yet exhausted before the 6 p.m. close, pole qualifying was to be extended into the next day. Among the cars still waiting in line were Jim Crawford, Michael Andretti, Eddie Cheever, and Danny Sullivan who was unable to refuel and get back in line in enough time.

=== Second Day – Sunday May 10 ===
With a handful of cars still eligible for the pole position, Roberto Guerrero was forced to wait through the night to see if his pole speed would hold up. Teammate Jim Crawford was still considered a threat, but another engine failure in the Sunday morning practice delivered the team yet another setback. Danny Sullivan, who had to abort his Saturday run due to a yellow light, was placed at the front of the line for Sunday. Sullivan qualified solidly without incident. Eddie Cheever secured a front row spot with a 229.639 mph run. Michael Andretti qualified for the second row.

Crawford's crew, scrambling to install a new motor, wheeled the car out to the pits yet unfinished, with parts in hand. Two crew members were actually sitting in the engine bay, working on it, as others pushed it towards the qualifying line. They were unable to finish the engine work in time, and Crawford missed out on his chance for the pole position. Moments later Roberto Guerrero was officially awarded the $100,000 PPG pole award.

Late in the day, the field filled to 27 cars. Al Unser Sr., A. J. Foyt and Raul Boesel all made runs. Crawford finally put his car in the field, but despite the 228.859 mph average (6th fastest overall), his status as a second day qualifier forced him to line up 21st.

== Practice – week 2 ==
=== Monday May 11 ===
A light day of activity saw Jeff Wood and Jovy Marcelo the fastest among non-qualified cars. Scott Pruett did a light spin, but made no contact.

=== Tuesday May 12 ===
Rain closed the track early at 2:25 p.m. Jovy Marcelo was the fastest among non-qualified cars, at 216.534 mph.

=== Wednesday May 13 ===
Increased activity was seen at the track. Lyn St. James was still struggling in the 212 mph range in her Cosworth. St. James' contract for Ford Motor Company had prevented her from driving the more powerful Chevrolet so far during the month.

=== Thursday May 14 ===
Ted Prappas led the non-qualified cars at 221.212 mph. Dick Simon Racing announced that an agreement had been made for Lyn St. James to utilize Philippe Gache's back up car, a Lola/Chevrolet. St. James was quickly over 218 mph.

=== Friday May 15 – Fatal crash of Jovy Marcelo ===
At 4:07 p.m., rookie Jovy Marcelo went low in turn one, and spun into the outside wall. The car slid along the wall, then came to rest in turn two. His car suffered major front end damage, and Marcelo was found unconscious. At 4:35 p.m., Marcelo was pronounced dead at Methodist Hospital of a basal skull fracture. It was the first driver fatality at the Indianapolis Motor Speedway since the fatal accident of Gordon Smiley exactly ten years earlier on May 15, 1982.

The final full day of practice, meanwhile, saw Tony Bettenhausen Jr. run the fastest lap of the week for non-qualified cars, 221.033 mph. Didier Theys was second at 220.146 mph in a John Andretti back-up car.

== Time trials – weekend 2 ==
=== Third Day – Saturday May 16 ===
The third day of time trials saw three cars added to the field. Tom Sneva joined as a third driver for Menard Racing, and Pancho Carter's month came to an end when he broke his arm in a turn 2 crash.

Lyn St. James ran her fastest laps of the month and became the second female driver to qualify for the Indianapolis 500. Her third lap of 220.902 mph was also a closed-course record for a female racing driver. She also became the oldest rookie driver in the history of the race, at age 45. Brian Bonner and Mike Groff (a teammate to Scott Goodyear) also completed runs, filling the field to 30 cars. Tom Sneva and Gordon Johncock were among those who waved off attempts.

=== Bump Day – Sunday May 17 ===
The final day of qualifying saw heavy track action. Several cars went out early on to qualify, but only Kenji Momota and Dominic Dobson finished their runs. At 2:45 p.m., in his third and final attempt, Tom Sneva put his car safely in the field at 219.737 mph. At that point, the field was filled, with Jimmy Vasser (218.268 mph) on the bubble.

At 3:50 p.m., Gordon Johncock bumped Vasser, which put Kenji Momota on the bubble. Vasser turned right around and re-qualified in a back-up car. Vasser's speed of 222.313 mph established him as the fastest rookie qualifier. The move put Scott Goodyear (219.054 mph) on the bubble.

In the final hour, after showing promise during practice, Didier Theys' third and final qualifying attempt ended with a blown engine. Likewise, Tony Bettenhausen could not get up to speed, and waved off. With six minutes left until the 6 o'clock gun, Ted Prappas took to the track. He bumped Scott Goodyear out by 0.089 seconds. Johnny Rutherford made one last futile attempt to qualify, but was too slow to bump his way in.

== Carburetion Day – Thursday May 21 ==
The final practice session saw Mario Andretti (226.409 mph) as the fastest car of the day. Ford Cosworth XB teams swept the top four spots. Pole-sitter Roberto Guerrero was fifth fastest, and Bobby Rahal was the fastest of the Chevrolet powered machines. Al Unser Jr. practiced a disappointing 25th speed rank. There were eight cautions during the two-hour session, but none for accidents.

During the week leading up to the race, Walker Racing announced that Scott Goodyear would replace Mike Groff in the team's qualified car. Goodyear, the team's primary driver, was bumped on the final day of time trials. The switch required the #15 car to be moved to the rear of the field, and Goodyear would start 33rd on race day.

=== Pit Stop Contest ===
The semifinals and finals for the 16th annual Miller Genuine Draft Pit Stop Contest were held on Thursday May 21. The top three race qualifiers and their respective pit crews were automatically eligible: Roberto Guerrero, Eddie Cheever, and Mario Andretti. Twelve additional teams entered the preliminary round to fill the fourth and final spot.

On Wednesday May 13, the cars of the Galles-KRACO Racing team made their preliminary runs. The results were Al Unser Jr. (12.522 seconds) and Danny Sullivan (13.715 seconds). On Thursday May 14, the preliminaries continued. Bobby Rahal (11.298 seconds) secured the fourth and final spot in the semifinals. Al Unser Jr.'s time from Wednesday held up as fifth-fastest, and he was declared the first alternate. The remainder of the results were as follows: Scott Brayton (13.371 seconds), Tony Bettenhausen (13.733 seconds), Michael Andretti, Scott Goodyear, and Gary Bettenhausen. Eric Bachelart, Brian Bonner, John Andretti, and Al Unser Sr. did not participate.

Two semifinal matches were held. Teams were required to change two tires and simulate a fuel coupling. In the first semifinal, Bobby Rahal defeated Roberto Guerrero. In the second semifinal round, Eddie Cheever edged out Mario Andretti by half a second. Rahal and Cheever advanced to the finals. It was the fifth time that Rahal had made it to the final round of the Pit Stop Contest, and first time as an owner-driver with his new team, Rahal-Hogan Racing. In his previous four final round matches, Rahal had never won the event.

For the final round, teams were required to change all four tires and again simulate a fuel coupling. Rahal's team, led by chief mechanic Jim Prescott defeated Eddie Cheever's team (Chip Ganassi Racing), led by Chris Griffis. Neither team incurred any penalties. Rahal had bought the former Patrick Racing team over the offseason, and it became known as Rahal-Hogan Racing. Patrick Racing had won the 1991 Pit Stop Contest, and several crew members from the 1991 winning team were also on Rahal's 1992 winning pit crew.

Semifinals
12	Bobby Rahal (Rahal-Hogan Racing)	13.330
36	Roberto Guerrero (King Racing)	21.980
9	Eddie Cheever (Chip Ganassi Racing)	13.877
2	Mario Andretti (Newman/Haas Racing)	14.307

Finals
12	Bobby Rahal (Rahal-Hogan Racing)	13.324
9	Eddie Cheever (Chip Ganassi Racing)	No time

== Starting grid ==
Row	Inside	Middle	Outside
1	(Colombia) 36 – Roberto Guerrero	(United States) 9 – Eddie Cheever	(United States) 2 – Mario Andretti (W)
2	(Netherlands) 6 – Arie Luyendyk (W)	(United States) 51 – Gary Bettenhausen	(United States) 1 – Michael Andretti
3	(United States) 22 – Scott Brayton	(United States) 18 – Danny Sullivan (W)	(United States) 4 – Rick Mears (W)
4	(United States) 12 – Bobby Rahal (W)	(Brazil) 5 – Emerson Fittipaldi (W)	(United States) 3 – Al Unser Jr.
5	(United States) 91 – Stan Fox	(United States) 8 – John Andretti	(Belgium) 19 – Éric Bachelart (R)
6	(France) 44 – Philippe Gache (R)	(United States) 10 – Scott Pruett	(United States) 93 – John Paul Jr.
7	(Canada) 7 – Paul Tracy (R)	(United States) 48 – Jeff Andretti	(United Kingdom) 26 – Jim Crawford
8	(United States) 27 – Al Unser (W)	(United States) 14 – A. J. Foyt (W)	(United States) 21 – Buddy Lazier
9	(Brazil) 11 – Raul Boesel	(United States) 39 – Brian Bonner (R)	(United States) 90 – Lyn St. James (R)
10	(United States) 47 – Jimmy Vasser (R)	(United States) 68 – Dominic Dobson	(United States) 59 – Tom Sneva (W)
11	(United States) 92 – Gordon Johncock (W)	(United States) 31 – Ted Prappas (R)	(Canada) 15 – Scott Goodyear†

Guerrero crashed during the second parade lap, and did not start the race. Gache also spun on the parade lap, and drove to the pits and missed the start. He joined the field on lap 3.
Scott Goodyear and Mike Groff were teammates for Walker Racing. Goodyear was the full-time primary driver (entered in a 1992 chassis), and Groff the second team driver (entered in a 1991 chassis). Due to a lingering oil pressure problem, and the hectic nature of the abbreviated pole day time trials session, Goodyear and Groff temporarily swapped cars to qualify, in order to take advantage of the favorable draw. At the close of qualifying, the team pre-planned to swap the drivers back to their original cars, and Goodyear and Groff would move to the rear of the field. However, at the close of qualifying, Groff had qualified 26th, but Goodyear was bumped. As expected, and as planned, Goodyear took Groff's place behind the wheel in the primary car. The driver switch required the car to be moved to the rear of the field (33rd).

=== Alternates ===
- First alternate: (United States) Mike Groff (#75/#17) – qualified 26th, but turned the car over to teammate Scott Goodyear

=== Failed to Qualify ===
- (Japan) Kenji Momota (R) (#88) – bumped
- (Belgium) Didier Theys (#38) – blew an engine during qualifying
- (United States) Tony Bettenhausen Jr. (#16/#61) – too slow
- (United States) Mark Dismore (#66/#93) – too slow
- (United States) Johnny Parsons (#30) – too slow
- (United States) Johnny Rutherford (W) (#17) – too slow
- (United States) Pancho Carter (#81) – crashed in practice; suffered broken arm
- (Japan) Hiro Matsushita (#11) – crashed in practice; suffered broken leg
- (Brazil) Nelson Piquet (R) (#27) – crashed in practice; suffered serious leg injuries
- (Philippines) Jovy Marcelo (R) (#50) – crashed in practice; fatally injured
- (Italy) Fabrizio Barbazza (#30/#42) – crashed during qualifying attempt

== Race recap ==
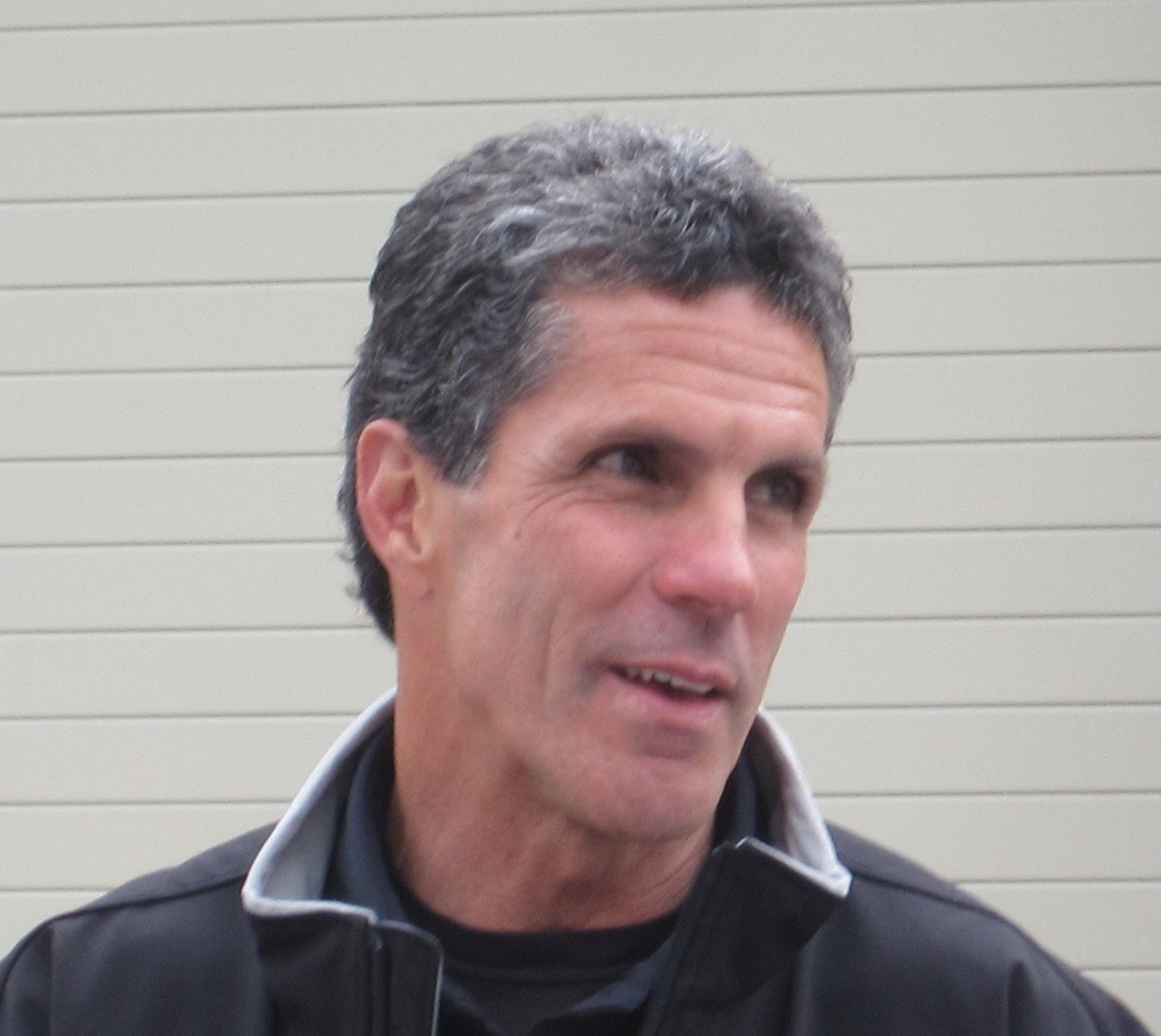
Pole-sitter Roberto Guerrero crashed during the pace laps.

A cold front entered the Indianapolis area the evening before the race, bringing misty rain and cold temperatures. Race morning dawned at 48 °F (9 °C), with winds gusting to 23 mph (37 km/h). The resulting wind chill was as low as 28 °F (−2 °C). Mary F. Hulman gave the starting command at 10:51 a.m., and the pace car, driven by Bobby Unser led the field on the way to the first parade lap. John Paul Jr.'s car experienced engine issues on the grid, but at the last second, he hastily pulled away to join the field. The cold weather made for precarious conditions for the drivers, as it would be increasingly difficult to warm up the slick tires.

As the field entered the backstretch on the second parade lap, polesitter Roberto Guerrero gunned his machine to warm up the tires. The back end whipped around, and the car spun into the inside wall. The suspension was damaged enough that he could not continue, and he was out of the race before the green flag. Moments later, Philippe Gache - suffering from a misfire - also lost control on cold tires. He spun lazily into the apron of turn 4. He did not make contact with the wall, and safety workers were able to push-start his car. Gache drove to the pits and the crew began diagnosing the misfire issue. A few extra pace laps had to be run, and the incidents delayed the start by about five minutes. Gache would miss the start, but would rejoin the race a few moments later.

=== Start ===
With the polesitter out of the race, second place starter Eddie Cheever was charged with leading the field to the green flag. Going into turn one, Michael and Mario Andretti split Cheever on the inside and outside. Michael took the lead, with Mario behind him in 2nd. Michael Andretti blistered the track to set a new record for the first lap at 210.339 mph. After only four laps of green flag racing, however, Éric Bachelart blew an engine. Unable to return to the pits, Bachelart brought out the yellow. During this caution period, Mario Andretti made two pit stops to have identified (and replaced) a shorted ignition wire, and dropped one lap down.

The field went back to green on lap 11. Michael Andretti led, with Eddie Cheever now in second. As the field raced into turn one, Mario Andretti was exiting the pits to re-join the race. On lap 12, Tom Sneva in what would be his final 500 lost control in turn four, and crashed hard into the outside wall. The car slid backwards down the frontstretch, and a long caution followed to clean up the debris.

During the yellow, tragedy nearly occurred. Buddy Lazier had been in the pits prior to Sneva's accident; his crew was examining a possible electrical issue. He returned to the track but was unaware of the location of the incident. As he was hustling to catch up to the rear of the field, Lazier suddenly came upon the crash scene at about 200 mph. The safety crew was out on the track picking up debris, and tending to Sneva, and Lazier nearly ran over one of the workers. Lazier veered towards the wall and whisked by worker Steve Wissen by mere "inches", blowing Wissen off of his feet, but did not hit him. Wissen was shaken up but not injured. Lazier and Wissen reconciled over the incident in 2017.

=== First half ===
On lap 21, the race finally got going with Michael Andretti leading. A fairly long stretch of green flag racing saw the race start to settle into a comfortable pace. Michael Andretti dominated, and began to lap the field. Andretti was running race laps in the high 220 mph range. Andretti was being chased primarily by Arie Luyendyk, Scott Brayton and Eddie Cheever. By lap 60, Andretti held a 30-second lead, and only three cars were on the lead lap. The average speed at lap 60 had climbed to 161.458 mph

Michael Andretti's blistering pace was halted on lap 62 when Gordon Johncock blew his engine. The caution bunched the field for a restart on lap 67. Moments after the green, rookie Philippe Gache spun and hit the outside wall. The car slid into the path of Stan Fox, and Fox plowed into the wreck. The crash was blamed on cold tires, and Gache's inexperience. Both drivers emerged from the crash without serious injury.

The green came back out on lap 75. In turn one, Jim Crawford lost control while attempting to pass John Andretti, and collected Rick Mears. Both cars crashed hard into the outside wall and rested on the south chute. Behind the crash, Emerson Fittipaldi lost control and hit the outside wall in turn one as well. All three drivers were sent to Methodist Hospital for minor injuries. Mears would miss the next race two weeks later in Detroit as a result of this crash.

On lap 84, the green came out once again, but as the field headed down the mainstretch, Mario Andretti crashed in turn four. He lost the rear of the car due to cold tires, and slammed nose-first hard into the wall. Andretti was brought to Methodist Hospital with broken toes. Like Mears, Mario would also miss the next race two weeks later in Detroit due to the crash.

The green came back out on lap 90, but the racing was brief as Scott Brayton blew an engine on lap 94. On the subsequent restart, Jimmy Vasser subsequently smacked the wall in turn one. At the same time, Paul Tracy - the last hope for the Penske Team - parked his car down in turn one with a blown engine. At the halfway point, the average speed had dropped to 126.322 mph due to all of the cautions.

Around the halfway point of the race, the National Weather Service had issued a bulletin. The temperature was 52 °F (11 °C), cloudy skies, with winds at 15 mph, resulting in a wind chill of 39 °F (4 °C).

=== Second half ===
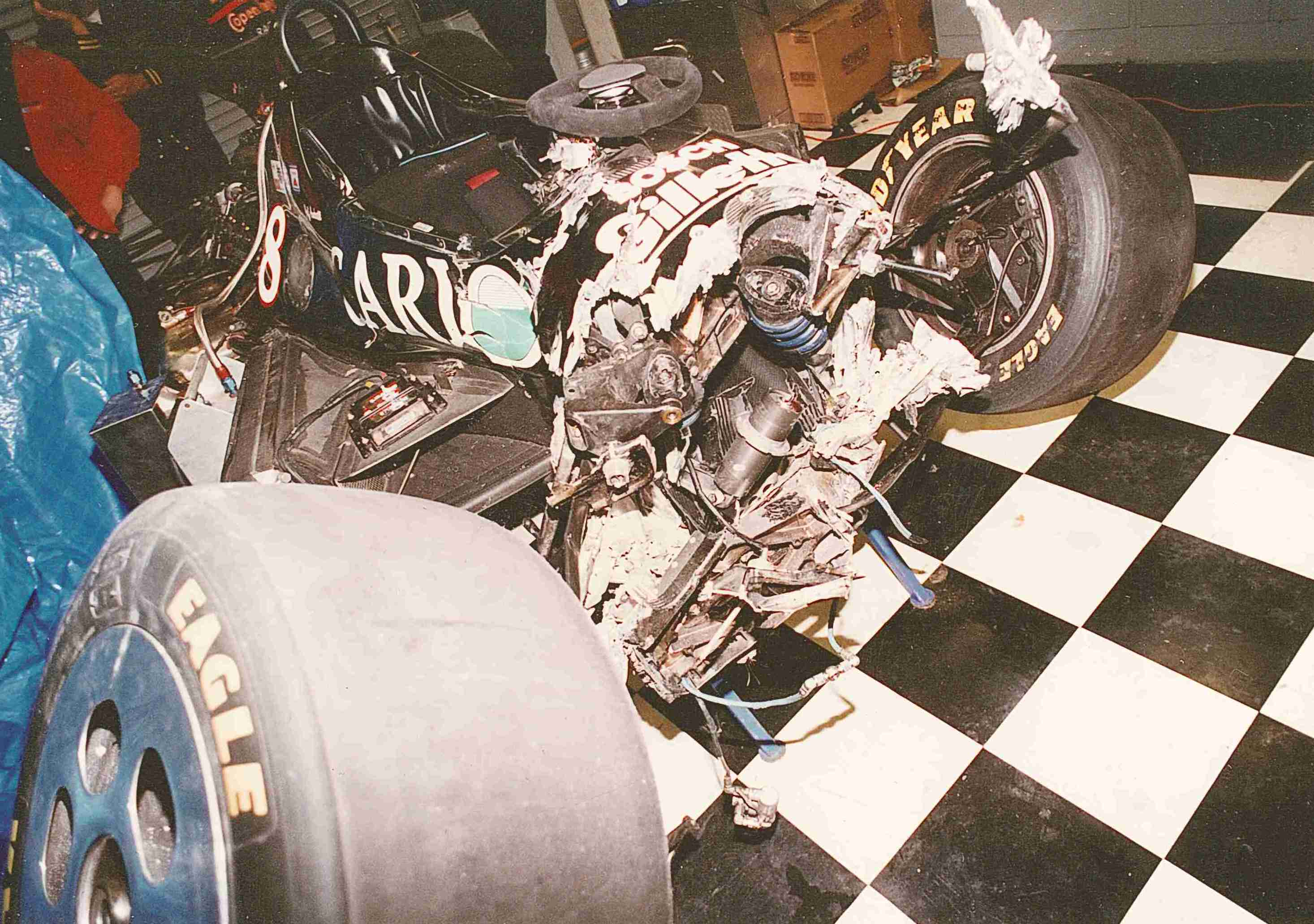
The devastating aftermath of Jeff Andretti's crash in turn 2

The field went back to green on lap 103, but cold tires struck again. Rookie Brian Bonner lost control and crashed in turn 4. The field safely restarted on lap 110. Five laps later, however, another major crash occurred. Jeff Andretti's car broke a right-rear wheel hub in turn two. The wheel came off and the car snapped into a hard spin, crashing head-on into the wall near the Turn Two Suites. The front of the car was demolished, and Andretti suffered severe leg injuries. Andretti's errant right-rear wheel bounced off the outside retaining wall and flew high into the air and across the track. The wheel struck Gary Bettenhausen's left front suspension, sending him out of control into the inside wall at the start of the backstretch. It took 18 minutes to extricate Jeff Andretti from the car, and he was immediately transported to Methodist Hospital for surgery. Bettenhausen was uninjured, but out of the race with suspension damage. Meanwhile, Jeff's older brother Michael Andretti was still leading. Michael, however, had just seen both his father and brother crash and be sent to the hospital, with little information on their respective conditions.

Just seconds before Jeff Andretti's crash, Bobby Rahal was forced to pit to change a punctured tire. Rahal narrowly avoided the incident, as he was on the warm-up apron in turn two just ahead of Andretti's spinning car. When the yellow came out for the Andretti/Bettenhausen crash, Rahal lost a lap, and would be mired a lap down the rest of the way.

From lap 62 to lap 122, only nine laps of green flag racing were turned in. Eight cautions slowed the race for almost 90 minutes.

The race finally got back underway on lap 123. Michael Andretti took over where he had left off, and pulled away from the competition. The dwindling field was down to 17 cars, and only six were on the lead lap. Among the cars still in contention were Ganassi teammates Eddie Cheever and Arie Luyendyk. Al Unser Jr. and Al Unser Sr. had moved up into the top five, and Scott Goodyear had climbed from last starting position to 6th place (last car on the lead lap). A. J. Foyt had worked his way into the top ten, and by lap 135, Lyn St. James was the only rookie still running.

On lap 137, Arie Luyendyk attempted to lap A. J. Foyt, but Foyt had lost a mirror and did not see him. Luyendyk got into the "marbles", and slid up into the turn 4 wall. The green resumed on lap 144, with Al Unser Jr. in the lead after a sequence of pit stops. Michael Andretti charged towards the front, but Al Unser Sr. passed him for second momentarily. The dicing was halted when Buddy Lazier blew an engine and brought another yellow out. Only 15 cars were still running, five of which were on the lead lap.

With 45 laps to go, the green came out and the field began the race to the finish. Michael Andretti once again began to easily pull away from his competitors. On the 166th lap, he ran a record race lap of 229.118 mph, en route to a 15-second lead.

On laps 171–177, the field began circulating through a series of green-flag pit stops. It would be the final scheduled stops of the day. During the sequence, Al Sr. passed his son Al Jr. and led for four laps. After the leaders shuffled through their stops, Michael Andretti was back in the lead by 23 seconds.

=== Finish ===
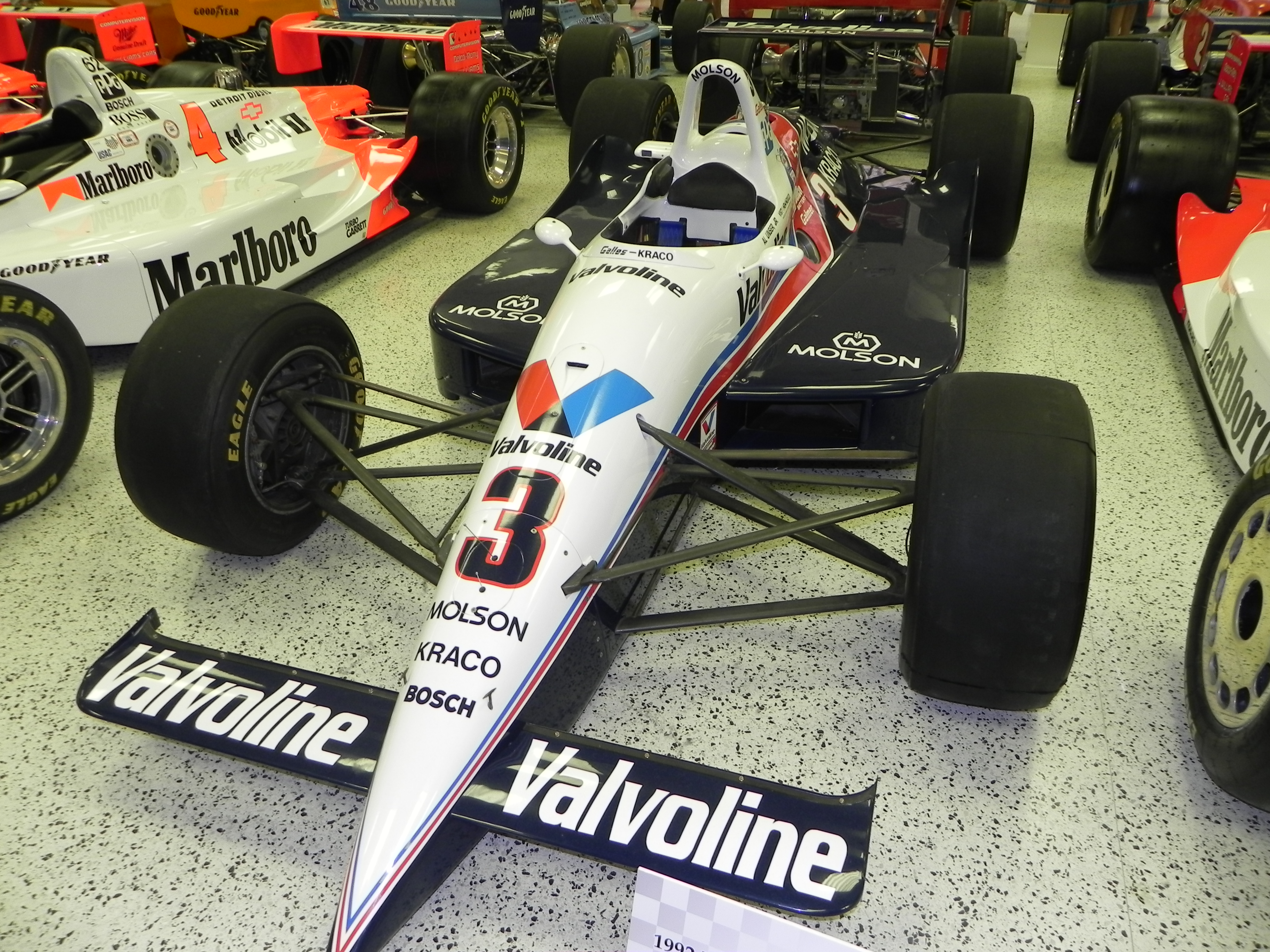
Al Unser Jr.'s 1992 Indy 500 winning Galmer.

With 12 laps to go, Michael Andretti held a 28-second lead over Scott Goodyear. One lap later, Al Unser Jr. passed Goodyear for second place. On lap 189, Michael Andretti was pulling alongside Al Sr. to put him a lap down in turn two. Down the backstretch, however, Andretti suddenly began to slow. His fuel pump had failed, and the car coasted to a stop in the north short chute. Andretti had dominated nearly the entire race up to that point, and had led 160 of the first 189 laps.

Al Unser Jr. suddenly inherited the lead, with Scott Goodyear right behind him in second. The caution came out for Andretti's stalled car, and the field bunched up for a late-race restart.

With 7 laps to go, the green flag came out, and the race was down to a tense two-man battle between Al Unser Jr. and Scott Goodyear. With four laps to go, Unser held a 0.3-second lead. The cars battled nose-to-tail around the entire track, with the savvy Unser holding off Goodyear. On the final lap, Goodyear drafted Unser down the backstretch, and tucked closely behind through the final turn. In turn four, Unser got loose, and claimed he had to back off the throttle slightly, and Goodyear pounced on the opportunity to close in. Out of the final turn, Goodyear zig-zagged behind Unser down the straightaway. A few hundred yards from the finish line, Goodyear pulled alongside, attempting a slingshot pass. Unser held him off officially by 0.043 seconds, less than one car length. It was the closest finish in Indianapolis 500 history until 2026.

Al Unser Sr. edged out Eddie Cheever by a split second for third place. A. J. Foyt brought his car home in 9th, while John Paul Jr., who nursed his car all day with a broken fuel cable, avoided all the crashes to finish 10th. Lyn St. James (11th place) clinched the rookie of the year award, as she was the only rookie left running. Danny Sullivan finished 5th, giving Galles/KRACO Racing two cars in the top five. It was Sullivan's first top ten since 1986. CART points leader Bobby Rahal also escaped the carnage, coming home 6th, and maintained his points lead.

It was the first of three bitter defeats in the Indy 500 for Scott Goodyear. Goodyear, an experienced road racer, was lauded by many for charging from last place (33rd) to nearly winning the race. It would have been the first time in Indy history that a driver won from the last starting position, and would have been Goodyear's first win in Indy car competition. Later in the year, he would triumph at the Michigan 500. In a post-race interview a disappointed but happy Goodyear said "This is a real disappointment. When Michael Andretti lost the lead those last few laps I thought 'This is a real possibility.' It was a two-car race from there. I just couldn't get enough time against him and he just beat me. We just drove flat-out those last 3 laps and my Mackenzie team did a fantastic job. We had an up-and-down month and they gave me such a good race-car. I just needed a little more time to get him."

In victory lane, a very emotional Al Unser Jr. climbed from the cockpit, and was interviewed by ABC-TV's Jack Arute. When Arute noticed some tears behind Unser, Jr's voice, Unser Jr. responded in what would become one of the most famous quotes regarding victory at the Indianapolis 500:

Well, you just don't know what Indy means!

Unser's quote would be replayed in many subsequent airings, as well as during the intro for ABC's Wide World of Sports in reference to the famous catchphrase "The Thrill of Victory".

== Box score ==
Finish	Start	No.	Driver	Team	Qual	Chassis	Engine	Laps	Status
1	12	3	(United States) Al Unser Jr.	Galles/KRACO Racing	222.989	Galmer G92	Ilmor-Chevrolet A	200	134.477 mph
2	33	15	(Canada) Scott Goodyear	Walker Racing	221.800	Lola T92/00	Ilmor-Chevrolet A	200	+0.043 seconds
3	22	27	(United States) Al Unser Sr. W	Team Menard	223.744	Lola T92/00	Buick V-6	200	+10.236 seconds
4	2	9	(United States) Eddie Cheever	Chip Ganassi Racing	229.639	Lola T92/00	Ford-Cosworth XB	200	+10.281 seconds
5	8	18	(United States) Danny Sullivan W	Galles/KRACO Racing	224.838	Galmer G92	Ilmor-Chevrolet A	199	-1 lap
6	10	12	(United States) Bobby Rahal W	Rahal/Hogan Racing	224.158	Lola T92/00	Ilmor-Chevrolet A	199	-1 lap
7	25	11	(Brazil) Raul Boesel	Dick Simon Racing	222.433	Lola T92/00	Ilmor-Chevrolet A	198	-2 laps
8	14	8	(United States) John Andretti	Jim Hall Racing	222.644	Lola T92/00	Ilmor-Chevrolet A	195	-5 laps
9	23	14	(United States) A. J. Foyt W	A. J. Foyt Enterprises	222.798	Lola T92/00	Ilmor-Chevrolet A	195	-5 laps
10	18	93	(United States) John Paul Jr.	D.B. Mann Development	220.244	Lola T90/00	Buick V-6	194	-6 laps
11	27	90	(United States) Lyn St. James R	Dick Simon Racing	220.150	Lola T12/00	Ilmor-Chevrolet A	193	-7 laps
12	29	68	(United States) Dominic Dobson	Burns Racing	220.359	Lola T91/00	Ilmor-Chevrolet A	193	-7 laps
13	6	1	(United States) Michael Andretti	Newman/Haas Racing	228.168	Lola T92/00	Ford-Cosworth XB	189	Fuel Pressure
14	24	21	(United States) Buddy Lazier	Leader Cards Racing	222.688	Lola T91/00	Buick V-6	139	Engine
15	4	6	(Netherlands) Arie Luyendyk W	Chip Ganassi Racing	229.127	Lola T92/00	Ford-Cosworth XB	135	Crash T4
16	32	31	(United States) Ted Prappas R	P.I.G. Racing	219.173	Lola T91/00	Ilmor-Chevrolet A	135	Gear Box
17	5	51	(United States) Gary Bettenhausen	Team Menard	228.932	Lola T92/00	Buick V-6	112	Crash BS
18	20	48	(United States) Jeff Andretti	A. J. Foyt Enterprises	219.306	Lola T92/00	Ilmor-Chevrolet A	109	Crash T2
19	26	39	(United States) Brian Bonner R	Dale Coyne Racing	220.845	Lola T91/00	Buick V-6	97	Crash T4
20	19	7	(Canada) Paul Tracy R	Penske Racing	219.751	Penske PC-20	Ilmor-Chevrolet A	96	Engine
21	28	47	(United States) Jimmy Vasser R	Hayhoe Racing	222.313	Lola T91/00	Ilmor-Chevrolet A	94	Crash T1
22	7	22	(United States) Scott Brayton	Dick Simon Racing	226.142	Lola T92/00	Buick V-6	93	Engine
23	3	2	(United States) Mario Andretti W	Newman/Haas Racing	229.503	Lola T92/00	Ford-Cosworth XB	78	Crash T4
24	11	5	(Brazil) Emerson Fittipaldi W	Penske Racing	223.607	Penske PC-21	Ilmor-Chevrolet B	75	Crash T1
25	21	26	(United Kingdom) Jim Crawford	King Racing	228.859	Lola T92/00	Buick V-6	74	Crash T1
26	9	4	(United States) Rick Mears W	Penske Racing	224.594	Penske PC-21	Ilmor-Chevrolet B	74	Crash T1
27	13	91	(United States) Stan Fox	Hemelgarn Racing	222.867	Lola T91/00	Buick V-6	63	Crash SS
28	16	44	(France) Philippe Gache R	Dick Simon Racing	221.496	Lola T91/00	Ilmor-Chevrolet A	61	Crash T1
29	31	92	(United States) Gordon Johncock W	Hemelgarn Racing	219.287	Lola T91/00	Buick V-6	60	Engine
30	17	10	(United States) Scott Pruett	Truesports	220.464	Truesports 92C	Ilmor-Chevrolet A	52	Engine
31	30	59	(United States) Tom Sneva W	Team Menard	219.737	Lola T91/00	Buick V-6	10	Crash T4
32	15	19	(Belgium) Éric Bachelart R	Dale Coyne Racing	221.549	Lola T90/00	Buick V-6	4	Engine
33	1	36	(Colombia) Roberto Guerrero	King Racing	232.481	Lola T92/00	Buick V-6	0	Crash BS

W Former Indianapolis 500 winner

R Indianapolis 500 Rookie

All cars utilized Goodyear tires.

=== Race statistics ===
Lap Leaders
Laps	Leader
1–6	Michael Andretti
7	Mario Andretti
8–13	Michael Andretti
14–20	Eddie Cheever
21–46	Michael Andretti
47	Eddie Cheever
48	Arie Luyendyk
49–87	Michael Andretti
88	Eddie Cheever
89–107	Michael Andretti
108–109	Al Unser Jr.
110–115	Michael Andretti
116	Al Unser Jr.
117–140	Michael Andretti
141–151	Al Unser Jr.
152–173	Michael Andretti
174–177	Al Unser
178–189	Michael Andretti
190–200	Al Unser Jr.

Total laps led
Driver	Laps
Michael Andretti	160
Al Unser Jr.	25
Eddie Cheever	9
Al Unser	4
Mario Andretti	1
Arie Luyendyk	1

Cautions: 13 for 85 laps
Laps	Reason
Pace lap	Roberto Guerrero crash on backstretch; Philippe Gache spin in turn 4
6–10	Eric Bachelart blown engine
12–20	Tom Sneva crash in turn 4
62–66	Gordon Johncock blown engine
67–75	Stan Fox, Philippe Gache crash in turn 1
76–83	Crawford, Mears, Fittipaldi crash in turn 1
83–89	Mario Andretti crash in turn 4
94–96	Scott Brayton blown engine
97–102	Jimmy Vasser crash in turn 1; Paul Tracy blown engine
102–109	Brian Bonner crash in turn 4
115–122	Jeff Andretti, Gary Bettenhausen crash in turn 2
137–143	Arie Luyendyk crash in turn 4
150–155	Buddy Lazier blown engine
190–193	Michael Andretti stalled on track

== Legacy ==
Scott Goodyear's charge from 33rd starting position to second place marked the second time a driver had done so in Indy history, Tom Sneva went from 33rd to 2nd in 1980. The winning margin of Unser over Goodyear was later deemed to be closer than published. Unser's Galmer-Chevrolet placed its timing transponder in the nose of the car rather than the sidepod, the standard location in all the other cars. Goodyear's Lola lagged behind due to its placement of the transponder in the sidepod. USAC officials estimated an unofficial winning margin of 0.0331 seconds.

The exciting finish of the 1992 Indy 500 was overshadowed by the vast number of serious crashes during the month, including the fatal crash of Jovy Marcelo and the devastating injures suffered by both Nelson Piquet and Jeff Andretti. The crash-filled race saw 13 cautions for 85 laps, and the slowest average speed since 1958. Several drivers spent time in the hospital, while others required lengthy rehabilitation. At the next Indy car race at Detroit, several drivers required substitute drivers, including Mario Andretti, Rick Mears, and Hiro Matsushita.

In the aftermath of his crashes during practice and the race, Rick Mears raced only a partial schedule for the remainder of the 1992 season. He dropped out of the Michigan 500 due to the nagging injured wrist he suffered in his practice crash and abruptly retired from driving in December. The 1992 race was also the final start for A. J. Foyt, who would retire from the cockpit before the 1993 race.

The Andretti Family's misfortunes during the race reflected back to the Andretti Curse. Jeff Andretti's devastating leg injuries, Mario Andretti's foot injuries, and Michael Andretti's shocking late-race fuel pump failure collectively amounted to one of the worst examples of bad luck the family ever experienced at Indianapolis. Michael Andretti would not return to Indy for two years, due to his 1993 Formula One participation, and Jeff would qualify only one additional time in his career. A couple years later, family patriarch Mario reflected on the day in his autobiography Andretti. With his youngest son Jeff undergoing surgery, himself recuperating in a hospital bed, and hearing of his other son Michael's heartbreaking loss, the elder Andretti called it the "worst day of my life."

During the summer of 1992, the track would be reconfigured for safety reasons. The apron at the bottom of the track was removed and replaced with a new warm up lane. The outside retaining wall was also replaced. These improvements were completed in time for the 1993 race.

== Statistics ==
- The race was held on May 24, only the third time in Indy history the race had fallen on that date. The previous winners on that date had been Bobby Unser (May 24, 1981) and Al Unser Sr. (May 24, 1987). Al Unser Jr.'s victory on May 24, 1992, marked all three runnings on that date as victories by the Unser family.
- Michael Andretti led 160 laps but failed to win the race. It was the most laps led by a non-winner since his father Mario led 170 in a losing effort in the 1987 race.
- Polesitter Roberto Guerrero became the third pole winner to finish last. Cliff Woodbury (1929) and Pancho Carter (1985) were the previous two at the time.
- Eddie Cheever became the first #2 starter to complete 500 miles since Mario Andretti in 1969. During that period, the second starting position was experiencing a perceived "curse," where it produced no winners, and cars frequently dropping out. In the intervening 22 races, the #1 and #3 starting positions had accounted for 12 victories.
- Al Unser Sr. became the first driver to complete 500 miles in a car powered by a Buick V6 engine. His third-place finish was the highest finishing position for a Buick powered car since its debut in 1985, and would ultimately be the best finishing position for that engine.
- A record ten former winners representing 20 victories started the race. The ten drivers included:
  - A. J. Foyt (4 wins)
  - Al Unser Sr. (4)
  - Rick Mears (4)
  - Gordon Johncock (2)
  - Mario Andretti (1)
  - Tom Sneva (1)
  - Danny Sullivan (1)
  - Bobby Rahal (1)
  - Emerson Fittipaldi (1)
  - Arie Luyendyk (1)

Three-time winner Johnny Rutherford also attempted to qualify, but was too slow. With Al Unser Jr. a first-time winner, the field ultimately comprised 11 winners. In addition, Eddie Cheever and Buddy Lazier would eventually go on to win the race, bringing the winners total to 13 drivers (representing 26 victories) in the 1992 field.

- Although A. J. Foyt, Al Unser Sr., and Rick Mears had competed together for many years, this was the first and only time they took the green flag together as four-time winners.
- This was the most recent 500 with two drivers in the field with three or more victories until it was accomplished again in 2013, with both Hélio Castroneves and Dario Franchitti, each with 3 victories apiece.
- There were 85 caution laps. Had the pace car been considered an official entry it would have finished 23rd.

== Broadcasting ==
=== Radio ===
"Al Unser Jr. has the lead, one more turn to go...here they come, coming to the finish line, Bob Jenkins, who's gonna win it?!"

"The checkered flag is out...S-[cott] Goodyear makes a move!...Little Al wins by just a few tenths of a second!...perhaps the closest finish in the history of the Indianapolis 500!"

— Bob Lamey (turn 4) and Bob Jenkins (chief announcer) calling the final moments of the race.

The race was carried live on the IMS Radio Network. Bob Jenkins served as chief announcer for the third year. Derek Daly served as the "driver expert." Daly, who had experience on ESPN, replaced Johnny Rutherford for 1992, but this would be his only appearance on the network. The broadcast was heard on over 600 affiliates.

Bob Forbes conducted the winner's interview in victory lane. It would be the final time until 2004 that a separate interview would be conducted by the radio network crew. In subsequent years, the radio network would simulcast the winner's interview from television.

Other than Daly, the rest of the crew remained the same from 1991. The 1992 race, notable for its windy and cold weather, saw the turn announcers reporting from admittedly uncomfortable locations.

The radio network call of the closest finish in Indy history was critically praised and replayed often. The last seconds of the call were included in a television commercial for Valvoline (Unser Jr.'s sponsor) which ran for several months following the race.

Indianapolis Motor Speedway Radio Network
Booth Announcers	Turn Reporters	Pit/garage reporters
Chief Announcer: Bob Jenkins; Driver expert: Derek Daly; Statistician: Howdy Bell; Historian: Donald Davidson	Turn 1: Jerry Baker; Turn 2: Gary Lee; Turn 3: Larry Henry; Turn 4: Bob Lamey	Bob Forbes (north pits); Brian Hammons (north-center pits); Sally Larvick (south-center pits); Chris McClure (south pits); Chuck Marlowe (garages)

=== Television ===
The race was carried live flag-to-flag coverage in the United States on ABC Sports. Paul Page served as host and play-by-play announcer, accompanied by Bobby Unser and Sam Posey. For the second time, Unser served as the pace car driver, and reported live from the pace car on the warm up laps.

The same exact crew from 1990 to 1991 returned. The 1992 broadcast is notable in that it missed the finish of the race. As Al Unser Jr. held off Scott Goodyear at the finish line, the director cut to a camera angle over the flagstand, and viewers were not able to see the leaders actually cross the line until a replay was shown.

Locally, ABC affiliate WRTV arranged to air the race in same-day tape delay in the Indianapolis market. The race is blacked out in Indianapolis, and previously would not be shown locally until a week or two weeks after the race was held.

The broadcast registered a 10.9 rating (34 share) with 37 million viewers, the highest since going to a live broadcast in 1986. The final two hours peaked at 11.8/34.

The broadcast has re-aired numerous times on ESPN Classic since the mid-2000s.

ABC Television
Booth Announcers	Pit/garage reporters
Host/Announcer: Paul Page; Color: Sam Posey; Color: Bobby Unser	Jack Arute; Gary Gerould; Dr. Jerry Punch

== 1991–92 USAC Gold Crown Championship ==
1991–92 USAC Championship Car season
- USAC Gold Crown Championship

Season
- Races: 1

Awards
- National champion: (United States) Al Unser Jr.

The 1991–92 USAC Gold Crown Championship season consisted of one sanctioned race. The schedule was based on a split-calendar, beginning in June 1991 and running through May 1992. Starting in 1981, USAC scaled back their participation in top-level Indy car racing, and ultimately ceased sanctioning races outside of the Indianapolis 500 following their 1983–84 season. Subsequently, the Gold Crown Championship would consist of only one event annually; the winner of the Indianapolis 500 would be the de facto Gold Crown champion, as it was their lone points-paying event. The preeminent national championship season was instead sanctioned by CART, and the Indy 500 paid championship points separately (on a different scale) toward the CART championship as well.

Al Unser Jr., by virtue of winning the 1992 Indianapolis 500, also won the 1991–92 USAC Championship.

=== Final points standings (Top five) ===
Pos	Driver	INDY (United States)	Pts
1	(United States) Al Unser Jr.	1	1000
2	(Canada) Scott Goodyear	2	800
3	(United States) Al Unser Sr.	3	700
4	(United States) Eddie Cheever	4	600
5	(United States) Danny Sullivan	5	500

== Gallery ==
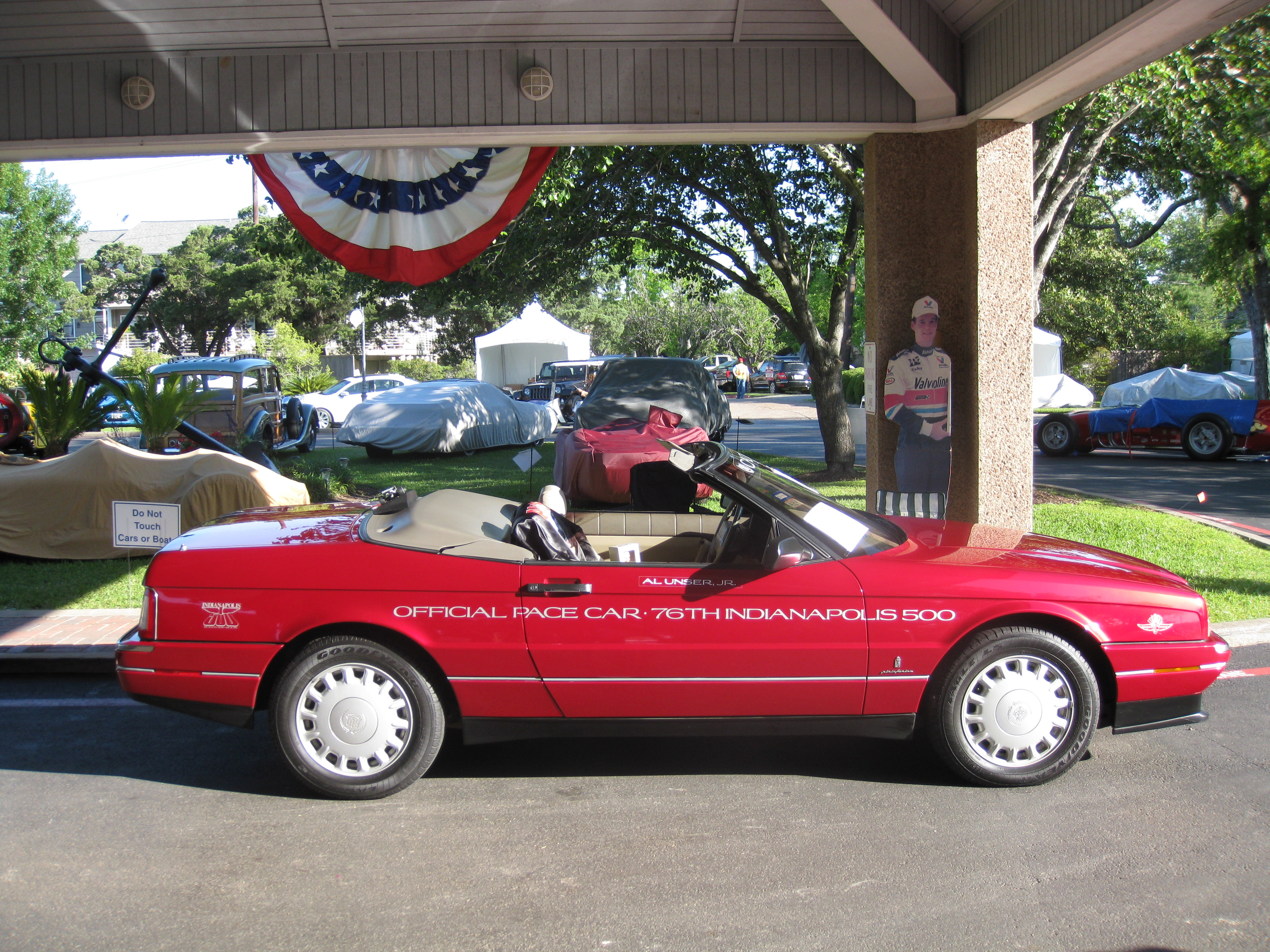
1992 Cadillac Allanté pace car

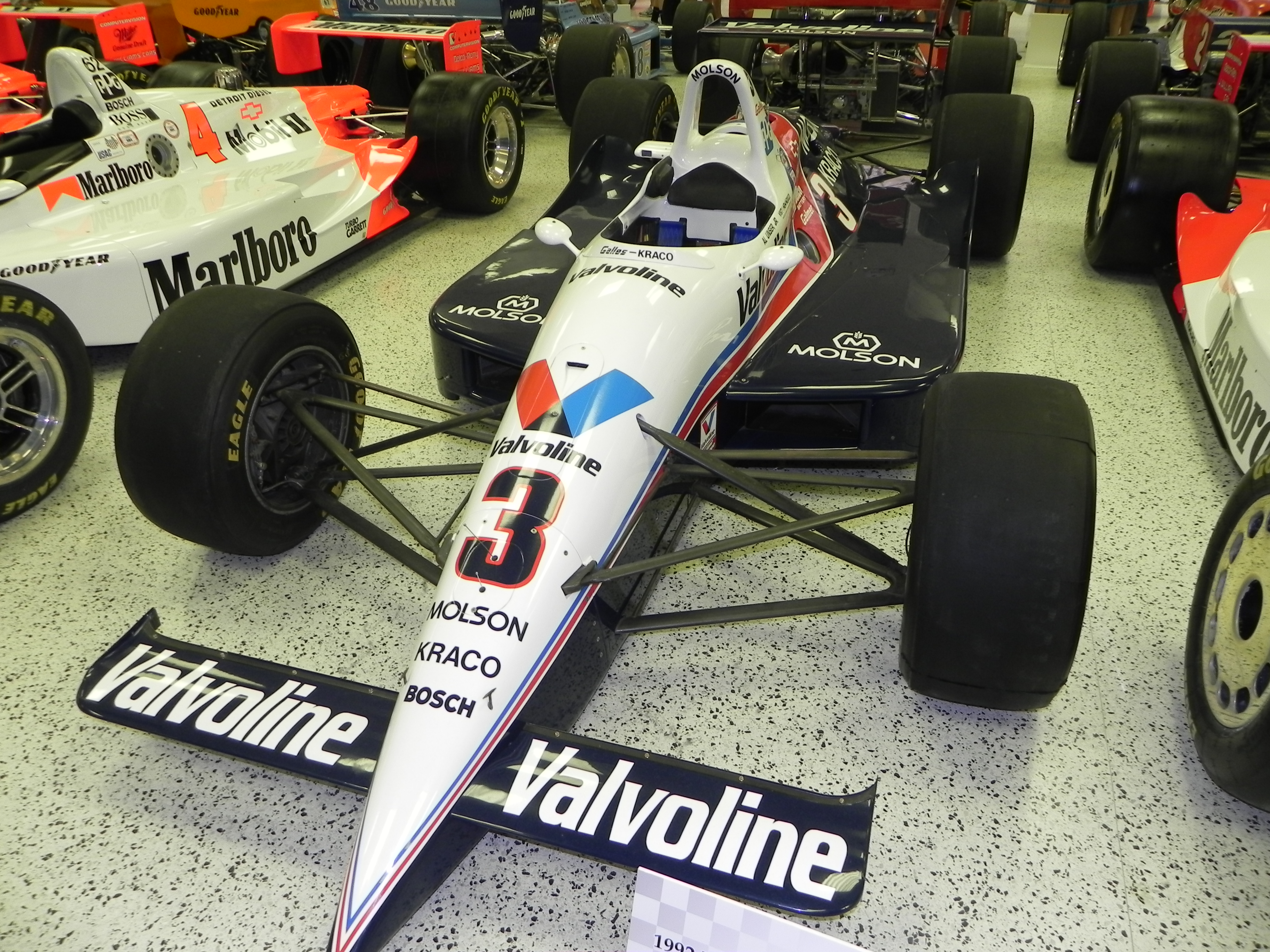
Al Unser Jr. 1992 winning car

== Notes ==
=== Works cited ===
- 1992 Indianapolis 500 Day-By-Day Trackside Report For the Media
- Indianapolis 500 History: Race & All-Time Stats – Official Site
- 1992 Indianapolis 500 Radio Broadcast, Indianapolis Motor Speedway Radio Network

== Bibliography ==
- Indy Review, Volume 2: 76th Indianapolis 500. Osceola, WI: Indy 500 Publications / Indianapolis Motor Speedway Corporation. 1992. ISBN 978-1-880526-01-9.

=== External links ===
- NYTimes: SPORTS PEOPLE: AUTO RACING; Indy 500's Finish Was Even Closer July 3, 1992
- Video of Michael Andretti's break down with 11 laps to go

1991 Indianapolis 500; Rick Mears	1992 Indianapolis 500; Al Unser Jr.	1993 Indianapolis 500; Emerson Fittipaldi
