= Brian Bonner (racing driver) =

American racing driver

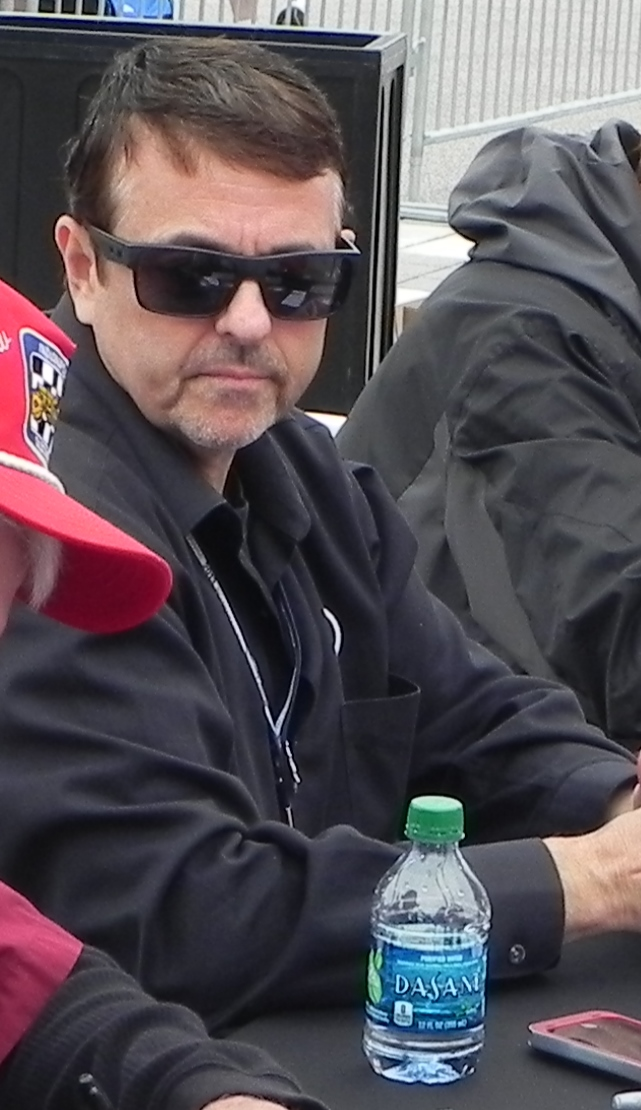
Bonner in 2013

Brian Bonner (born September 22, 1959) is a former driver in the CART Championship Car series.

Bonner began his racing career on two wheels, racing motorcycles from 1975 to 1985. He attended a racing school at Lime Rock Park in 1986 and quickly saw success in Formula Ford competition. He then drove in the Firestone Firehawk Series and Barber Saab Pro Series. In 1990 and 1991, Bonner drove full-time in the IMSA GT Championship for Essex Racing in 1990 and Tom Milner Racing in 1991. He also made three starts in 1989 and 1990 in the American Racing Series.

In 1992, Bonner moved to CART Champ Car and completed his rookie test at Sebring Raceway. He qualified for his first CART race, the 1992 Indianapolis 500 driving for Dale Coyne Racing in the 26th position but was knocked out by a crash after 97 laps. His best CART finish came two weeks later and was tenth position at the 1992 Detroit Grand Prix driving for Foyt Enterprises. He made one other start in 1992 with Dale Coyne Racing (Mid-Ohio). he made his final start in 1993 with Hemelgarn Racing at the Cleveland Grand Prix after failing to qualify for the 1993 Indianapolis 500.

== Racing record ==
=== American Open Wheel results ===
(key)

==== IndyCar World Series ====
Year	Team	1	2	3	4	5	6	7	8	9	10	11	12	13	14	15	16	Rank	Points	Ref
1992	Dale Coyne Racing	SRF	PHX	LBH	INDY; 19			MIL; DNS	NHA; DNS	TOR	MIS	CLE	ROA	VAN	MOH; 17	NAZ	LAG	28th	3	
1992	A. J. Foyt Enterprises					DET; 10	POR											28th	3	
1993	Leadercard Racing	SRF	PHX	LBH	INDY; DNQ	MIL	DET	POR										50th	0	
1993	Nu-Tech								CLE; 26	TOR	MIS	NHA	ROA	VAN	MOH	NAZ	LAG	50th	0	

=== NASCAR ===
(key)

==== Winston Cup Series ====
NASCAR Winston Cup Series results
Year	Team	No.	Make	1	2	3	4	5	6	7	8	9	10	11	12	13	14	15	16	17	18	19	20	21	22	23	24	25	26	27	28	29	30	31	NWCC	Pts	Ref
1994	A. J. Foyt Enterprises	50	Ford	DAY	CAR	RCH	ATL	DAR	BRI	NWS	MAR	TAL	SON	CLT	DOV	POC	MCH	DAY	NHA	POC	TAL	IND	GLN; DNQ	MCH	BRI	DAR	RCH	DOV	MAR	NWS	CLT	CAR	PHO	ATL; DNQ	N/A	0	
