= Merle Bettenhausen =

American racing driver (1943–2026)

- Nationality: American
- Born: June 9, 1943 Tinley Park, Illinois, U.S.
- Died: April 29, 2026 (aged 82) Indianapolis, Indiana, U.S.

Champ Car career
- 3 races run over 3 years
- Years active: 1969–1970, 1972
- Best finish: 41st – 1970
- First race: 1970 Tony Bettenhausen 100 (Springfield)
- Last race: 1972 Michigan 200 (Michigan)
Wins	Podiums	Poles
0	0	0

Merle M. Bettenhausen (June 9, 1943 – April 29, 2026) was an American race car driver. The second oldest member of the Bettenhausen racing family, he was the son of Tony Bettenhausen and the brother of Gary Bettenhausen and Tony Bettenhausen Jr.

== Racing career ==
Bettenhausen began his racing career in 1964 running street stocks at the race track in Tinley Park. Bettenhausen first participation in a sprint car race occurred in 1968 at the Iowa State Fairgrounds, where he crashed out of the consolation race. Later in the year, Bettenhausen won his first USAC midget car race at Indianapolis Raceway Park.

Bettenhausen's USAC Champ Car racing career was brief and tragic. Bettenhausen failed to qualify for the 1972 Indianapolis 500 after crashing his car in practice. Three laps into his first Champ Car race on a paved track, Michigan International Speedway on July 16, 1972, he tangled with Mike Hiss and crashed into the outside wall. The car exploded in flames and Bettenhausen tried to climb out while it was still moving. His right arm became trapped between the car and the wall and was torn off.

Despite the loss of his right arm, Bettenhausen continued racing in dirt events, particularly driving midget cars in the USAC championship. Bettenhausen used a prosthetic arm with a hook appendage to allow him to grip the steering wheel to continue racing, finishing the 1973 USAC midget season 16th in points with one win.

Bettenhausen continued to race until July 1974 when he abruptly retired, citing both the recent birth of his daughter and a severe race crash that his older brother Gary had recently suffered that had crushed Gary's left arm and left it nearly paralyzed.

== Personal life and death ==
For several years after retiring from driving, Bettenhausen remained involved in racing in other roles. He initially started a business selling fuel and tires at dirt tracks across the United States. He later worked for his brother Tony Jr.'s team, Bettenhausen Racing, that ran in CART.

Bettenhausen resided in Indianapolis and worked in the retail automobile business. He had a son, Ryan Bettenhausen, and a daughter, Tracy Jennings.

Bettenhausen suffered a stroke in early April 2026. He died on April 29, at the age of 82.
