= Greg Weld =

American racing driver (1944–2008)

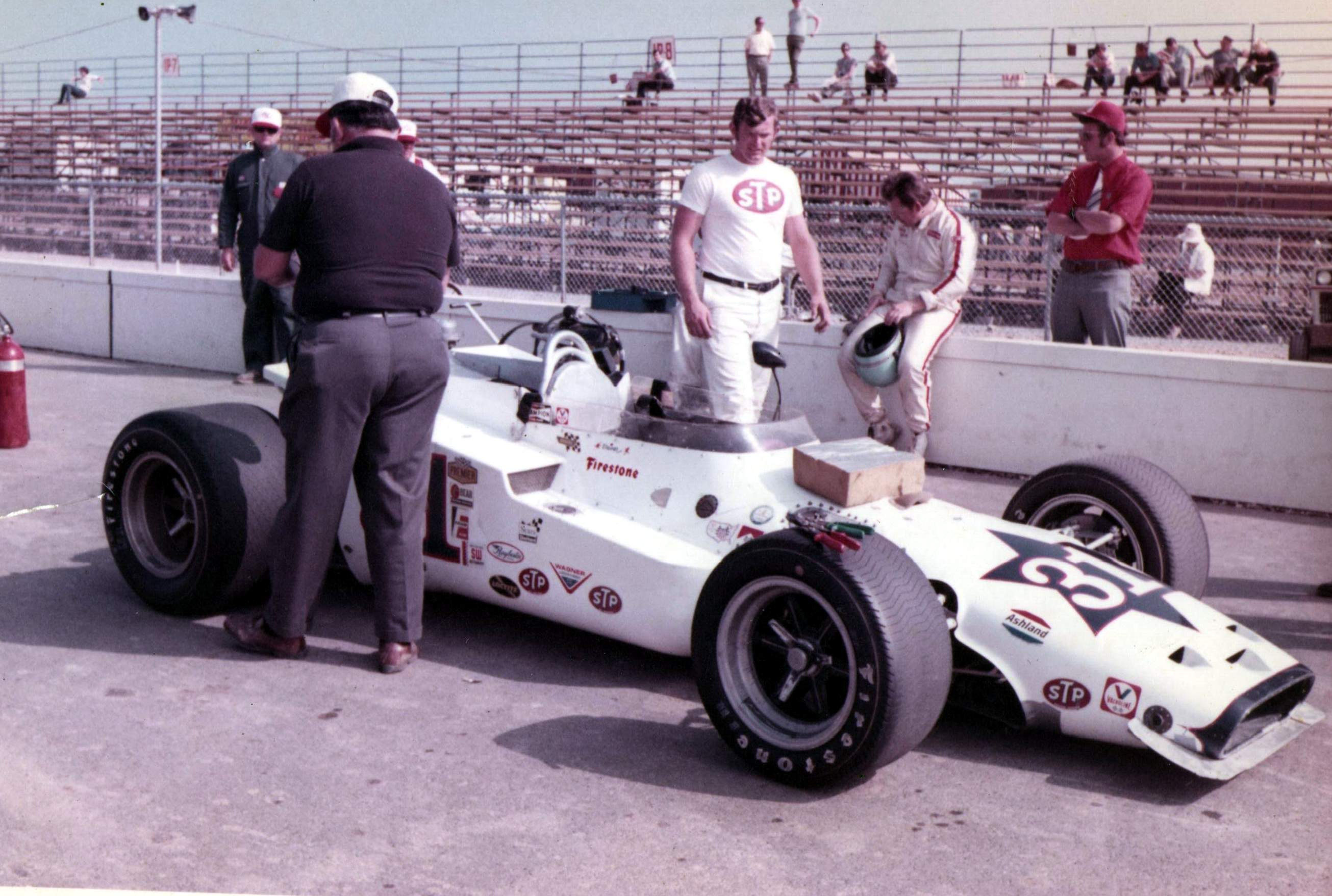
- Weld's Championship car
- Born: Richard Gregory Weld; March 4, 1944 Kansas City, Missouri, U.S.
- Died: August 4, 2008 (aged 64) Kansas City, Missouri, U.S.

Champ Car career
- 36 races run over 9 years
- Years active: 1965–1973
- Best finish: 22nd – 1970
- First race: 1965 Hoosier Hundred (ISF)
- Last race: 1972 Best Western 150 (Phoenix)
Wins	Podiums	Poles
0	0	4

Greg Weld (March 4, 1944 – August 4, 2008) was an American racecar driver and later a businessman who founded an automotive aftermarkets parts manufacturer that carries his name.

Weld won the 1963 Knoxville Nationals, the premiere event in sprint car racing. Weld raced in the USAC Championship Car series in the 1965–1972 seasons, with 36 career starts, including the 1970 Indianapolis 500. He finished in the top-ten 11 times, with his best finish in fourth position in 1970 at Sacramento. He was also the 1967 USAC Sprint Car Series champion. He was the last driver to pilot a car powered by the famous Novi engine at the Indianapolis Motor Speedway when he crashed during a qualification attempt in 1966.

Weld also founded Weld Wheel Industries, a firm manufacturing forged alloy wheels for various vehicles, including race cars, and was an active sponsor of both race cars and series, including the United States Auto Club series, and ran the firm until its acquisition by American Racing Equipment in 2006, and acquired by Momo and later Grupo Cisneros in 2017. Today, it is part of the MW Company, based in Kansas City, Missouri.

== Awards ==
- He was inducted in the National Sprint Car Hall of Fame in 1998.

=== Indy 500 results ===
Year	Chassis	Engine	Start	Finish
1965	Halibrand	Offy	Failed Rookie Test	
1966	Granatelli	Novi	Qualifying Crash	
1967	Eisert	Chevrolet	Qualifying Crash	
1968	Vollstedt	Ford	Failed to Qualify	
1970	Gerhardt	Offy	28th	32nd
1971	Gerhardt	Offy	Failed to Qualify	
1973	Kingfish	Offy	Practice Crash	
