= Missouri State Fair Speedway =

Race track in Sedalia, Missouri

- Location: Sedalia, Missouri
- Coordinates: 38°41′35″N 93°15′23″W
- Opened: 1901 (horse racing); 1914 (auto racing)
- Former names: Sedalia's State Fair Speedway, State Fair Raceway, State Fair Speedway, State Fair Motor Speedway
- Major events: USAC Championship Car; Sedalia 100 (1970)

Half-mile (1936–present)
- Surface: Dirt
- Length: .805 km (0.500 mi)

One mile (1901–1998)
- Surface: Dirt
- Length: 1.6 km (0.99 mi)

Missouri State Fair Speedway is a half-mile (.805 km) dirt oval race track located at the Missouri State Fair grounds in Sedalia, Missouri. The track was built along with the fairgrounds in 1901 as a one-mile (1.6-km) horse racing track. The first auto races were held in 1914 and 1915. Cars returned from 1935 until 1941, and again from 1946 until 1985 and 1989 until the mile was abandoned in 1998. One USAC National Championship race was held on the mile in 1970, won by Al Unser.

The current half-mile (.805-km) oval was built in 1936, holding car racing from 1949 until 1985, and since 1989. Both tracks are listed as contributing structures to the Missouri State Fairgrounds Historic District, listed on the National Register of Historic Places.
