= Rollie Beale =

American racecar driver

Rolland H. Beale (January 16, 1930 – February 17, 2014) was an American racecar driver.

A native of Toledo, Ohio, Beale was the 1973 United States Auto Club Sprint Car Series champion, claiming 32 feature race wins in his career. He was inducted into the National Sprint Car Hall of Fame in 1996.
