= Mario Andretti =

American racing driver (born 1940)

Mario Andretti OMRI
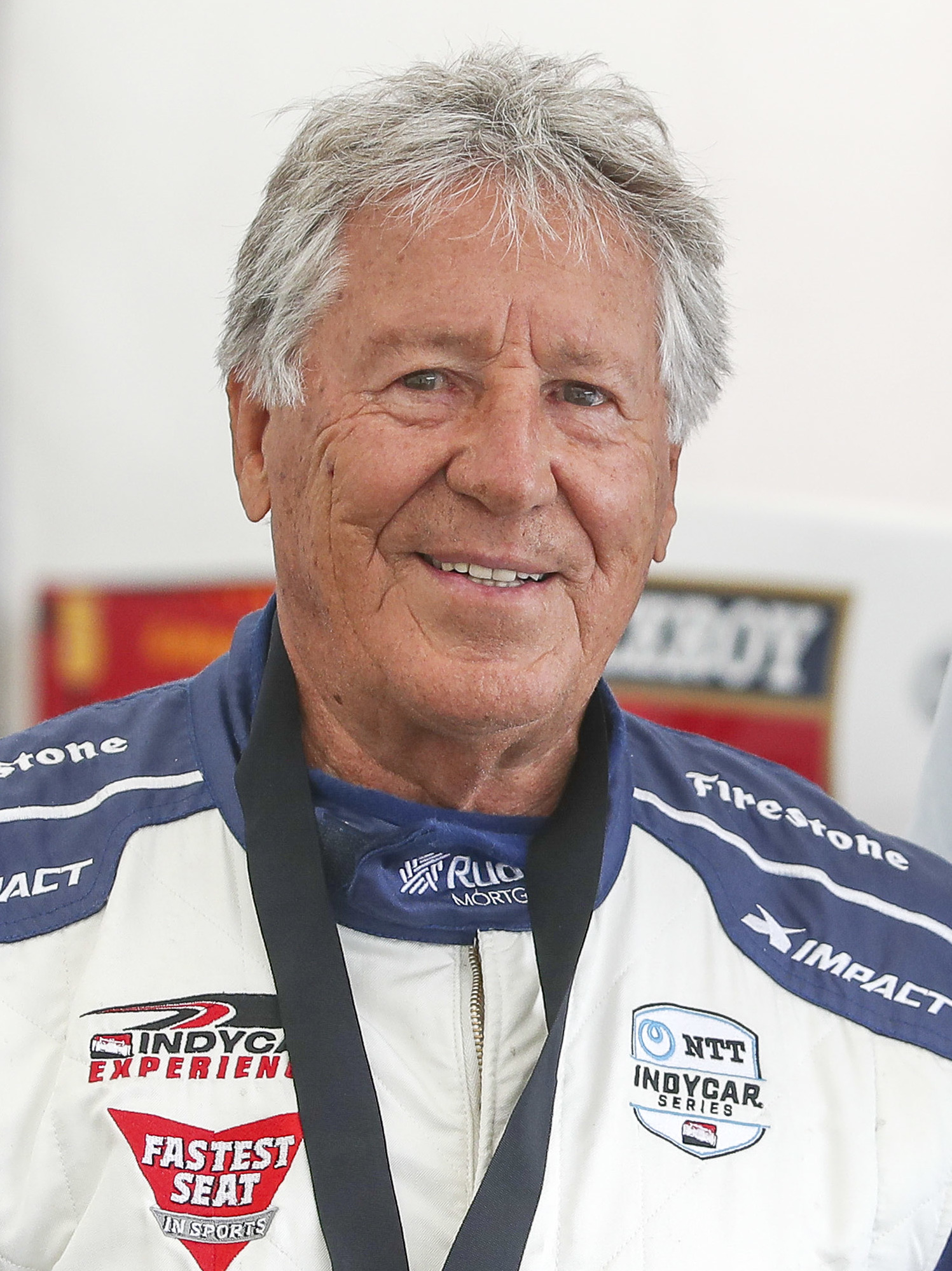
- Andretti in 2021
- Born: Mario Gabriele Andretti; February 28, 1940 (age 86); Montona, Istria, Kingdom of Italy
- Spouse: Dee Ann Hoch (m. 1961; died 2018)
- Children: 3, including Michael and Jeff
- Relatives: Aldo Andretti (brother); Marco Andretti (grandson); John Andretti (nephew); Adam Andretti (nephew)

Championship titles
- IndyCar National Championship (1965, 1966, 1969, 1984); USAC Silver Crown (1974); Formula One World Drivers' Championship (1978); IROC VI Champion (1979); Major victories; Daytona 500 (1967); 12 Hours of Sebring (1967, 1970, 1972); Indianapolis 500 (1969); Pikes Peak Hill Climb (1969); 24 Hours of Daytona (1972) (Note: The 24 Hours of Daytona was held as the 6 Hours of Daytona in 1972.); Michigan 500 (1984); Pocono 500 (1986)

Formula One World Championship career
- Nationality: (United States) American
- Active years: 1968–1972, 1974–1982
- Team(s): Lotus, privateer March, Ferrari, Parnelli, Alfa Romeo, Williams
- Entries: 131 (128 starts)
- Championships: 1 (1978)
- Wins: 12
- Podiums: 19
- Career points: 180
- Pole positions: 18
- Fastest laps: 10
- First entry: 1968 United States Grand Prix
- First win: 1971 South African Grand Prix
- Last win: 1978 Dutch Grand Prix
- Last entry: 1982 Caesars Palace Grand Prix

Champ Car career
- 407 races run over 31 years
- Best finish: 1st (1965, 1966, 1969, 1984)
- First race: 1964 Trenton 100 (Trenton)
- Last race: 1994 Monterey Grand Prix (Laguna Seca)
- First win: 1965 Hoosier Grand Prix (IRP)
- Last win: 1993 Valvoline 200 (Phoenix)
Wins	Podiums	Poles
52	141	65

NASCAR Cup Series career
- 14 races run over 4 years
- First race: 1966 Motor Trend 500 (Riverside)
- Last race: 1969 Motor Trend 500 (Riverside)
- First win: 1967 Daytona 500 (Daytona)
Wins	Top tens	Poles
1	3	0

24 Hours of Le Mans career
- Years: 1966–1967, 1982–1983, 1988, 1995–1997, 2000
- Teams: Ford, Mirage, Porsche, Courage, Panoz
- Best finish: 2nd (1995)
- Class wins: 1 (1995)
- Website: marioandretti.com

Mario Gabriele Andretti (born February 28, 1940) is an American former racing driver who competed in Formula One from 1968 to 1982, and IndyCar from 1964 to 1994. Andretti won the Formula One World Drivers' Championship in 1978 with Lotus, and won 12 Grands Prix across 14 seasons. In American open-wheel racing, Andretti won four IndyCar National Championship titles and the Indianapolis 500 in 1969; in stock car racing, he won the Daytona 500 in 1967. In endurance racing, Andretti is a three-time winner of the 12 Hours of Sebring.

Andretti and his family were displaced from Italian-controlled Istria during the Istrian–Dalmatian exodus and eventually emigrated to Nazareth, Pennsylvania in 1955. He began dirt track racing with his twin brother Aldo four years later, with Andretti progressing to USAC Championship Car in 1964. In open-wheel racing, he won back-to-back USAC titles in 1965 and 1966, also finishing runner-up in 1967 and 1968. He also contested stock car racing in his early career, winning the 1967 Daytona 500 with Holman-Moody. He took his first major sportscar racing victory at the 12 Hours of Sebring that year with Ford. Andretti debuted in Formula One at the United States Grand Prix in 1968 with Lotus, where he qualified on pole position. He contested several further Grands Prix with Lotus in 1969, when he won his third USAC title and the Indianapolis 500. In 1970, Andretti took his maiden podium finish at the Spanish Grand Prix with STP, driving a privateer March 701. He signed for Ferrari that year, winning at Sebring again.

Andretti took his maiden victory in Formula One at the season-opening South African Grand Prix in 1971, on debut for Ferrari. He took his third Sebring victory the following year. After part-time roles for Ferrari and Parnelli in 1972 and 1974, respectively, Andretti joined the latter full-time for 1975 after finishing runner-up in the SCCA Continental Championship. He moved back to Lotus in 1976, winning the season-ending Japanese Grand Prix and helping develop the 78. Andretti won four Grands Prix in 1977, finishing third in the World Drivers' Championship. He won the title in 1978 after achieving six victories, becoming the second World Drivers' Champion from the United States. After winless 1979 and 1980 campaigns with Lotus, he moved to Alfa Romeo in 1981. Following two fill-in appearances for Williams and Ferrari in 1982, Andretti retired from Formula One with 12 wins, 18 pole positions, 10 fastest laps and 19 podiums.

Andretti returned to full-time IndyCar racing in 1982, placing third in the standings with Patrick, amongst winning the Michigan 500. After finishing third again with Newman/Haas in his 1983 campaign, he won his fourth IndyCar title in 1984, 15 years after the previous and his first sanctioned by CART. He won the Pocono 500 in 1986 and remained with Newman/Haas until 1994; his victory at Phoenix in 1993 made him the oldest winner in IndyCar history, aged 53, as well as the first driver to win a race in four different decades. Andretti retired with 52 wins, 65 pole positions, and 141 podiums in IndyCar. His 111 official victories on major circuits across several motorsport disciplines saw his name become synonymous with speed in American popular culture. (Note: Alternatively given as 109.) His sons, Michael and Jeff, were both racing drivers, the former winning the CART title in 1991 and previously owning Andretti Global. Andretti serves on the board of directors of Cadillac in Formula One from its debut in 2026 onwards. He was inducted into the International Motorsports Hall of Fame in 2000.

== Early life ==
=== Childhood in Italy ===
Mario Gabriele Andretti was born on February 28, 1940, (Note: One source lists Andretti's birthday as February 29, that is, Leap Day. However, Andretti's official naturalization certificate lists his birthday as February 28.) to an Istrian-Italian family in Montona, Istria, Kingdom of Italy (present-day Motovun, Croatia). He was born six hours before his twin brother Aldo. He is the son of Alvise "Gigi" Andretti, who worked as a farm administrator in Italy and for Bethlehem Steel in the U.S., and his wife Rina. He also had an older sister, Anna Maria Andretti Burley.

Andretti's family owned a 2,100-acre (850 ha) farm in Montona, but after World War II, the Treaty of Paris (1947) transferred the territory to communist-controlled Yugoslavia. As a result, the Andretti family joined the Istrian–Dalmatian exodus in 1948. The family lost all their land and was permitted to take only one truckload of possessions. They spent seven years in a refugee camp in Lucca, living in an abandoned college dormitory without running water.

The Andretti twins were interested in racing at an early age. At age five, they raced hand-crafted wooden cars through the Montona streets. After moving to Lucca, the brothers got a job parking cars at a local garage. In his autobiography, Andretti wrote, "The first time I fired up a car, felt the engine shudder and the wheel come to life in my hands, I was hooked. It was a feeling I can't describe. I still get it every time I get into a race car."

The garage owners noticed the brothers' passion for racing and brought them to watch the 1954 Mille Miglia, which was won by two-time Formula One champion Alberto Ascari. Ascari became Andretti's personal idol. The twins also visited Monza for the Italian Grand Prix, where Andretti saw Ascari race against Juan Manuel Fangio. Although the twins did not have a grandstand seat, Andretti recalled "being just mesmerized, overwhelmed by the sound, by the speed."

=== Move to the United States ===
Following a three-year wait for U.S. visas, the Andretti family moved to the United States in 1955. After an eleven-day journey on the SS Conte Biancamano, they sailed into New York Harbor on Anna Maria's birthday of June 16. With just $125 in cash, they settled in Nazareth, Pennsylvania, where Alvise Andretti's brother-in-law Tony lived. Although Alvise planned to leave after five years, the family never left the United States.

Andretti opposed leaving Italy at the time. His father felt that moving to America would give his children the best opportunity to succeed in life, but did not want his sons to become motor racers, as the sport was extremely dangerous at the time. Andretti planned to become a welder, but racing was "the only passion [he] really had career wise," and he admitted that he might not have been able to become a racer if he had stayed in Italy. Andretti's father did not watch him race until Andretti reached IndyCar in 1964.

In his 1970 biography, Andretti said that he became a naturalized U.S. citizen on April 15, 1964. (His IndyCar debut was April 19, 1964). Andretti later revealed in a 2024 X post that he actually obtained U.S. citizenship on April 7, 1965.

== Early racing career ==
=== Debut in dirt track racing ===
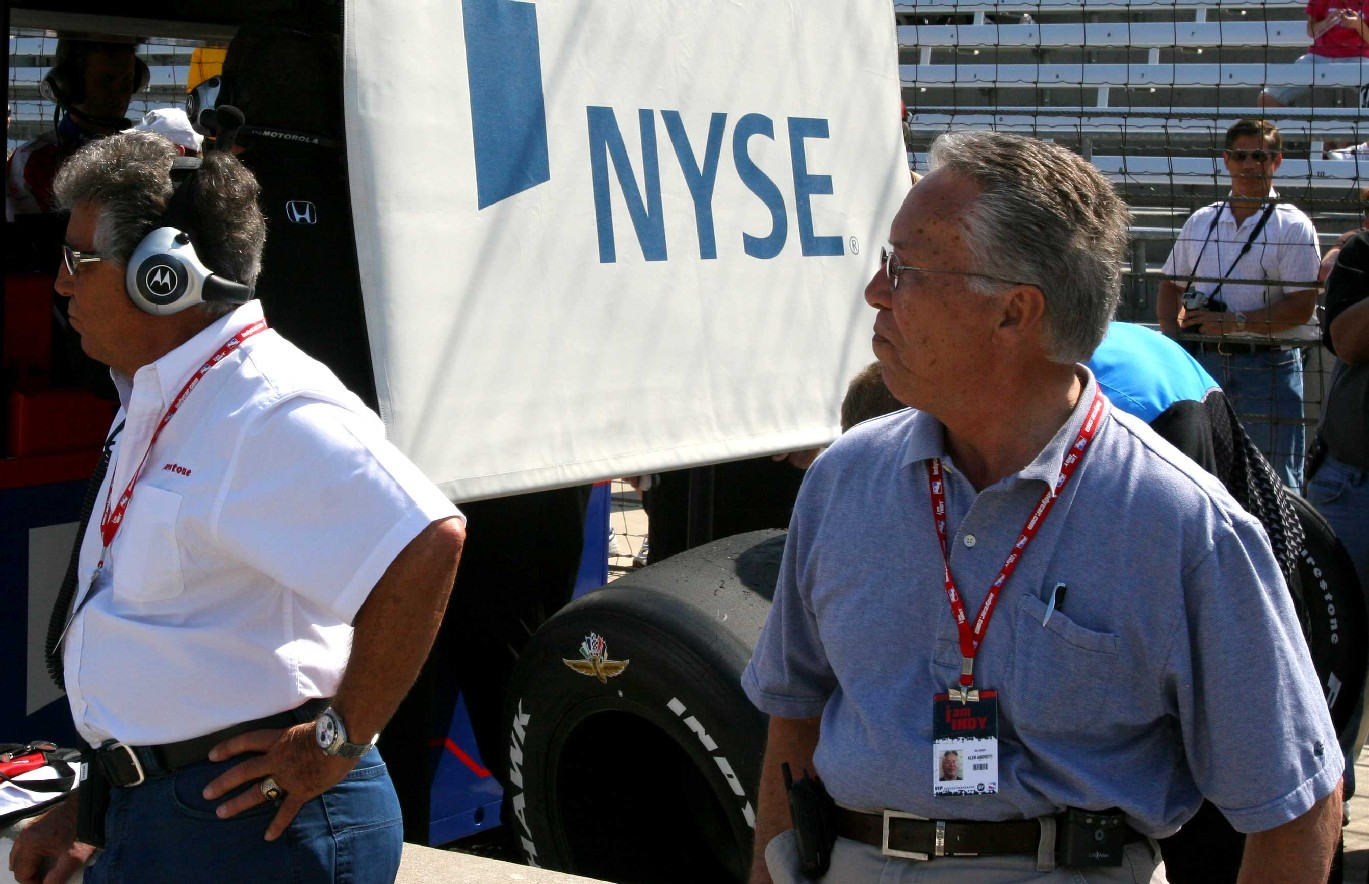
Mario (left) and his brother Aldo at the 2007 Indianapolis 500 pole day

The first car Andretti regularly drove was his father's 1957 Chevrolet, which the twins did not race, but nonetheless upgraded with features like a glasspack muffler and fuel injection. The twins were surprised to find that Nazareth hosted a half-mile dirt track, Nazareth Speedway. They used money they made working at their uncle's Sunoco station to refurbish a 1948 Hudson, using a stolen beer barrel as a fuel tank. The car was ready to race when the twins were 19 years old, but the minimum age to race was 21, so the brothers convinced a newspaper editor to falsify their drivers' licenses. After Aldo got into a major accident, the local chief of police spotted the forgery but turned a blind eye to save Aldo's health insurance.

The twins did not tell their father that they were racing until Aldo fractured his skull in a race and spent 62 days in a coma. Andretti's father nearly disowned Mario when the latter insisted on racing again, but eventually relented. Aldo also resumed racing, but suffered a career-ending accident in 1969.

The twins got off to a good start, picking up two wins each in sportsman racing after their first four races. In their first two weeks of racing, they won $300; they had previously been making $45 a week at the gas station. From 1960 to 1961, Mario won 21 out of 46 modified stock car races. The twins raced against each other only once, at Oswego Speedway in 1967; Mario won, with Aldo finishing tenth after a brake failure.

To intimidate their opponents, the twins bought Italian racing suits and fabricated a story about racing in junior formulae back in Italy. Andretti maintained the fiction for many years. In 2016, he admitted that the story was fabricated. He recalled that it "psych[ed] [the opponents] out, big time."

=== Single-seater racing ===
Despite his early successes in modified stock cars, Andretti's goal was to race in single-seater open-wheel cars. He started by racing midget cars in the American Racing Drivers Club (ARDC) series from 1961 to 1963, starting with 3/4 (sized) midgets before graduating to full-sized midgets. In March 1962, he won a midget race, which he dubbed "my first victory of any consequence." He raced in over one hundred events in 1963, and scored 29 top-five finishes in 46 ARDC races. He finished third in the 1963 ARDC season standings. On Labor Day in 1963, Andretti won three feature races at two different tracks, an afternoon race at Flemington and a doubleheader at Hatfield, after which reporter Chris Economaki told him that "you just bought the ticket to the big time."

From midget cars, the next step on the East Coast racing ladder was sprint car racing, first with the United Racing Club (URC) series and then with the United States Auto Club (USAC) series. Andretti attempted to secure a full-time URC ride, but received only spot starts. However, USAC team owner Rufus Gray gave him a full-time drive for 1964. He won one race at Salem and finished third in the season standings behind veterans Don Branson and Jud Larson. To cover his expenses, he worked as a foreman at a golf cart factory.

Andretti continued to race in sprint cars after progressing to IndyCar. In 1965 he won once at Ascot Park, and finished tenth in the season standings. In 1966 he won five times (Cumberland, Oswego, Rossburg, Salem, and Phoenix), but finished second in the standings, behind Roger McCluskey. In 1967 he won two of the three events that he entered.

== USAC IndyCar career ==
From 1956 to 1978, the top open-wheel racing series in North America was the USAC National Championship, alternatively referred to as IndyCar or Champ Car. In 1971, USAC split off its dirt-track races into a separate National Dirt Car Championship. The pavement championship retained the name USAC Championship Car Series, while the dirt championship had fewer races and was later rebranded to the "Silver Crown Series."

=== Breaking in (1964) ===
Andretti entered IndyCar during the 1964 season, while still racing full-time in sprint cars. On April 19, 1964, the Doug Stearly team gave him a spot start at the 1964 Trenton 100. He started 16th and finished 11th.

Andretti spent the first portion of the 1964 season trying to find a full-time IndyCar drive. An opening appeared to materialize when one of the big three IndyCar teams, Dean Van Lines Racing Division (DVL), lost Chuck Hulse to injury. Andretti met with DVL's chief mechanic, Clint Brawner, to ask for the drive. Although Andretti had come with an introduction from his sprint car team owner, Rufus Gray, Brawner turned Andretti down, as he was skeptical of sprint car racing and felt that Andretti was not ready to compete. He hired Bob Mathouser to replace Hulse. Andretti joined Lee Glessner's outfit, but was forced to sit out the 1964 Indianapolis 500.

=== Dean Van Lines, Andretti Racing, and STP (1964–1971) ===
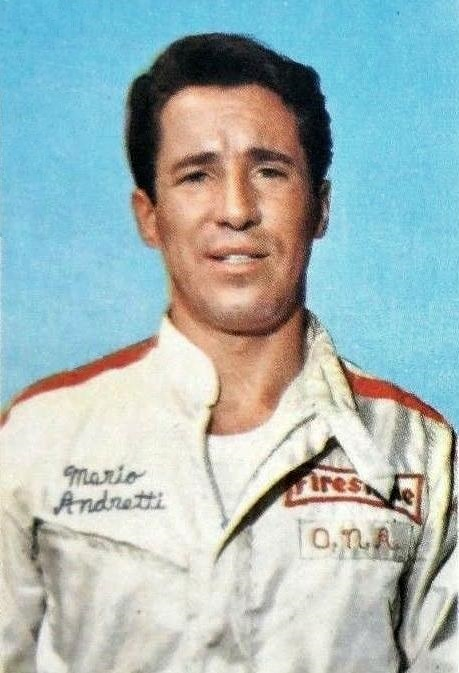
Andretti in 1970.

Andretti got his big break with DVL midway through the 1964 season, after the youngster impressed Brawner in two races: a sprint car race in Terre Haute, Indiana and an IndyCar race at Langhorne Speedway, where Andretti finished ninth, just three places below Mathouser, who had the better car. Brawner had mentored a young A. J. Foyt, and noticed that Andretti "worked as diligently on the car as Foyt had as a rookie with me." Andretti was pleased to join what he called one of the "few outfits worth driving for." He completed the final eight races of the season with DVL, finishing 11th in the season standings. He was named IndyCar Rookie of the Year. After the season, Brawner agreed to make Andretti his permanent driver in place of Hulse.

==== 1965–1969: Years of domination ====
The Andretti-Brawner combination would soon come to dominate the sport. It quickly attracted technical and financial support from Firestone and Ford; Brawner said that Ford treated DVL like a works team. From 1965 to 1969, Andretti won three USAC IndyCar titles. He also came within 93 points of winning five in a row; for comparison, at the time, 100 points was the difference between finishing sixth and seventh at the Indianapolis 500. At the peak of his statistical dominance, Andretti won 29 of 85 USAC championship races between 1966 and 1969.

In 1965, Andretti's first full season with DVL, he took advantage of the team's new Brawner Hawk, a derivation of the Brabham Formula One chassis. His third-place finish at the 1965 Indianapolis 500 earned him the race's Rookie of the Year award. He won his first IndyCar race at the Hoosier Grand Prix. Although he won only one race that year, he scored six second places and three third places, and scored points in 16 out of 18 races. His closest competitor, A. J. Foyt (who had won four of the last five USAC titles) won five races but failed to score seven times. At age 25, Andretti became the youngest IndyCar champion in history, a record he held for thirty years until Jacques Villeneuve won the 1995 title. To his irritation, however, when he appeared on Johnny Carson at the end of the season, he was introduced as the Indy 500 Rookie of the Year, which he felt downplayed his title win. (Note: Andretti had previously told a similar story about The Joey Bishop Show, but that show premiered in 1967. Andretti may have appeared on both shows in the 1960s, though not necessarily at the end of the 1965 season.)

In 1966, Andretti won his second straight USAC title. In contrast to his maiden title win, Andretti won eight of fifteen starts and led 1,142 laps, nearly 1,000 laps more than his closest competitor. He led 54.5% of all laps in 1966, a record until Al Unser's 66.8% in 1970, and still the second-highest figure in history as of the 2022 season. Andretti also took pole at the 1966 Indianapolis 500, but retired after 27 laps with a mechanical failure.

In 1967, Andretti lost the season USAC championship to A. J. Foyt. Although Andretti won eight races, Foyt won the 1967 Indianapolis 500; Andretti was on pole at Indianapolis but lost a wheel. Andretti fought through broken ribs to stay in the title race. Foyt carried a 340-point lead over Andretti going into the season-ending Rex Mays 300 at Riverside. Andretti ran out of fuel with four laps to go and settled for third, costing him 180 points. Ordinarily, he would have won the championship anyway, as third place was worth 420 points and Foyt had crashed on lap 50. However, Foyt's tire sponsor Goodyear arranged for him to commandeer Roger McCluskey's car to prevent Andretti, a Firestone man, from winning. Foyt piloted McCluskey's car to fifth place. Despite a point deduction, he won the championship by 80 points. Andretti received his first Driver of the Year award but was deflated by how the season ended, saying, "I had the championship in my hands, and then it was gone."

DVL owner Al Dean died at the end of the 1967 season. Per his wishes, the team was wound up. The estate sold the team's assets to Andretti, who became an owner-driver under the name Andretti Racing Enterprises. Brawner stayed on as chief mechanic. In 1968, Andretti once again lost the title at the final race of the season at Riverside, but this time in a reversal of the events of 1967. Andretti held a 304-point lead over Bobby Unser at the start and led Unser on track by 47 seconds at one point. However, his engine failed on lap 58. He borrowed Joe Leonard's car (whose brakes were dead) and then Lloyd Ruby's car for the final stretch. He fought back to third, but received only 165 points instead of the usual 420 since only his laps in Ruby's car were counted. Unser finished second, scoring 480 points. Unser won the title by 11 points, the narrowest margin in USAC history. Despite losing the title, Andretti set records for second-place finishes in a season (11 times in 27 starts) and podium finishes in a season (16), which still stand to this day.

Andretti Racing Enterprises IndyCar wins
#	Season	Date	Sanction	Track / Race	No.	Winning driver	Chassis	Engine	Tire	Grid	Laps Led
1	1968	August 4	USAC	Circuit Mont-Tremblant Heat 1 (R)	2	(United States) Mario Andretti	Hawk III	Ford Indy DOHC V8	Firestone	Pole	26
2	1968	August 4	USAC	Circuit Mont-Tremblant Heat 2 (R)	2	(United States) Mario Andretti (2)	Hawk III	Ford Indy DOHC V8	Firestone	Pole	38
3	1968	September 2	USAC	DuQuoin (DO)	2	(United States) Mario Andretti (3)	Kuzma 60 D	Offenhauser L4 252 cu	Firestone	6	94
4	1968	September 22	USAC	Trenton International Speedway (O)	2	(United States) Mario Andretti (4)	Hawk II	Offenhauser L4 TC 168 cu	Firestone	2	172

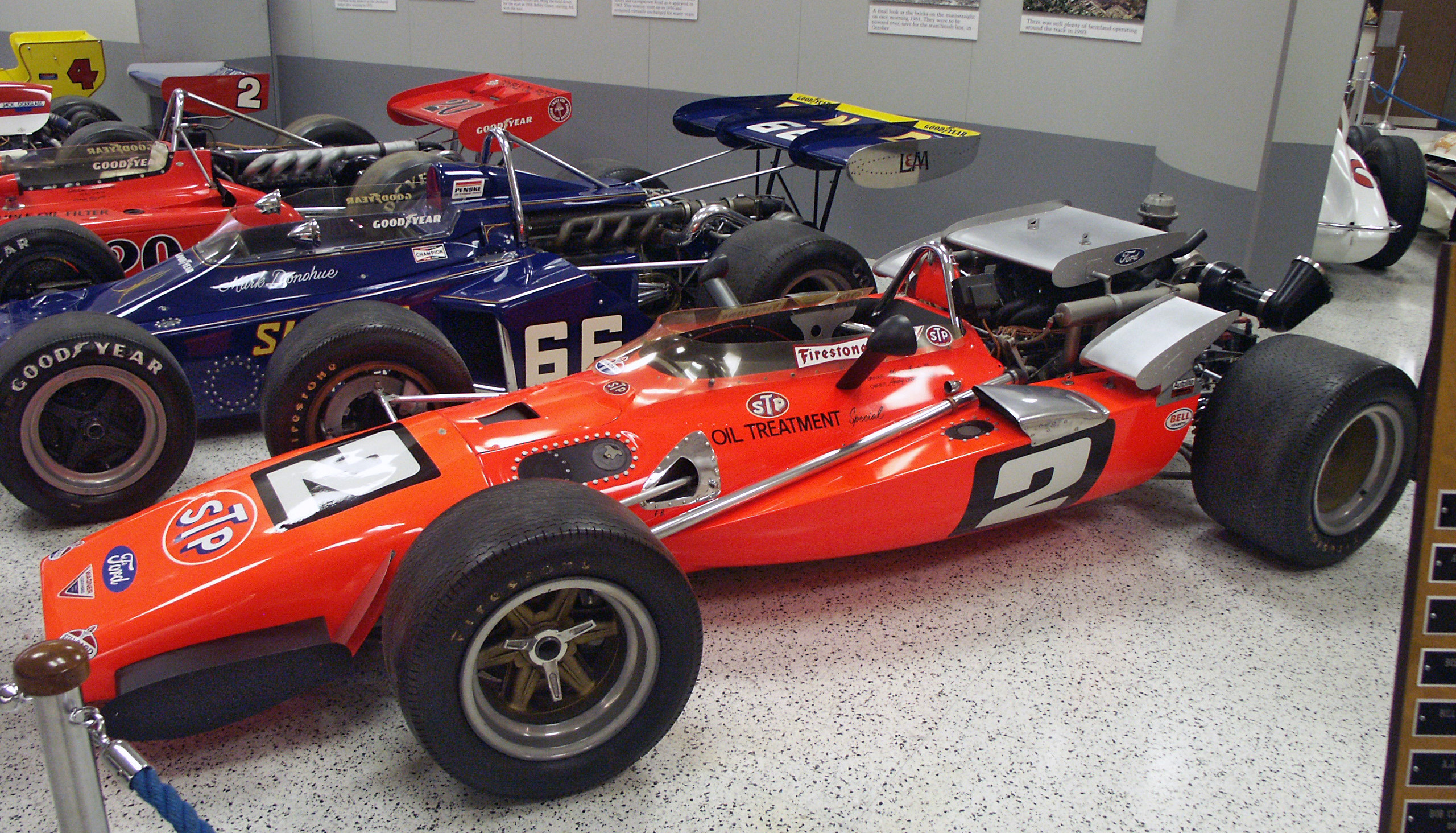
A replica of Andretti's 1969 Indianapolis 500-winning Brawner Hawk at the Indianapolis Motor Speedway Museum

Unhappy about being an owner-driver, and concerned that Firestone was cutting back its sponsorship budget, Andretti sold the team to Andy Granatelli's STP Corporation before the 1969 season. Granatelli retained the DVL cars and staff, although Brawner disliked Granatelli and insisted that he not participate in racing decisions. Andretti won nine races in 1969, including the 1969 Indianapolis 500 and the Pikes Peak International Hill Climb. He won his third title and was named ABC's Wide World of Sports Athlete of the Year. His 5,025 points were a USAC record, and he scored nearly twice as many points as runner-up Al Unser (2,630). His IndyCar prize money of $365,165 (including a $205,727 check for winning the Indianapolis 500) was, by one count, the largest single-season haul in the history of American sports to that point, and his total pay that year (including endorsements) was estimated at as much as $1 million.

==== 1970–1971: Team split and struggles ====
The core of the team split up after the 1969 title season, when Goodyear persuaded STP mechanics Clint Brawner and Jim McGee to start their own team. Andretti remained with STP, which agreed to sponsor him during the 1970 Formula One season in a privateer March.

Various reasons were given for the split. Brawner said that he and McGee left because Granatelli and Firestone were underpaying them, and added that his old-school thinking clashed with Andretti and McGee's desire to innovate. He was particularly hurt that Andretti wanted to retire the old Brawner Hawk for a chassis from Lotus. However, it was also rumored that Andretti forced out Brawner, which Andretti denied. In his foreword to Brawner's 1975 autobiography, Andretti wrote that "we had our disagreements, but until things started turning sour near the end, we worked them out." He added that "there are many reasons why our operation fell apart. ... Racing relationships are like Hollywood marriages: they seldom last long." McGee said that Andretti and Brawner had been "feuding for years," but "certainly respected each other." He opined that Brawner was unwilling to work for Granatelli. According to an urban legend, Brawner's wife Kay hexed Andretti's family after the STP split, giving rise to the so-called "Andretti curse."

Neither side fully recovered from the split. The Brawner/McGee team's financial backer went broke, and McGee returned to STP in 1971. Meanwhile, Andretti settled for a fifth-place finish in 1970, and the STP Formula One team shut down after one season. In 1971, Andretti fell to ninth in USAC's paved track championship. He scored no points in the dirt track standings, with a best finish of 13th.

=== Parnelli (1972–1975) ===
For the 1972 season, Andretti left STP and joined Vel's Parnelli Jones Racing. Parnelli was IndyCar's dominant team at the time, with 1970 champion Al Unser and 1971 champion Joe Leonard. Andretti persuaded the team to hire Lotus designer Maurice Philippe, and Jim McGee also joined the team. The combination was expected to be a "superteam."

Andretti never won an IndyCar title with Parnelli. In his three full-time IndyCar seasons with the team (1972–1974), Andretti finished 11th, 5th, and 14th, while his teammate Leonard won the 1972 title. He did better on dirt tracks, winning the 1974 title after winning three out of five races. He nearly won the 1973 title as well, but teammate Al Unser beat him even though Andretti won two out of three races. (Note: He skipped the 1972 season.)

During this period, Andretti was increasingly drawn to formula racing. He made guest appearances in Formula One with Ferrari in 1972, and raced in Formula 5000 in 1974 and 1975. In 1975, Andretti stopped competing full-time in IndyCar, instead driving full-time for the Parnelli Formula One team. After quitting Formula One in early 1976, Parnelli released Andretti from his USAC contract so that he could focus on Formula One.

=== Penske (1976–1978) ===
While racing with Team Lotus, Andretti appeared sporadically in IndyCar with McGee's new team, Penske Racing. In nineteen races from 1976 to 1978, he won one race (at Trenton in 1978) and collected eight top-five finishes.

== Stock car racing career ==
At the height of his IndyCar career, Andretti also made thirty appearances in top-level stock car racing from 1965 to 1969. Along with A. J. Foyt, he is one of two drivers to ever win NASCAR's most prestigious race, the Daytona 500, without being a full-time stock car driver.

In USAC, Andretti scored one win and eight top-five finishes in sixteen races from 1965 to 1968. His best season performance was 1967, when he competed in eight out of 22 races, won round 12 at Mosport, and finished seventh in the standings.

In the NASCAR Grand National Series, Andretti was less successful on average, with one win, one top-five finish, and three top tens in fourteen races from 1966 to 1969. He primarily drove for Ford works team Holman-Moody, securing the drive through his connections at Ford headquarters. He generally did not get the first pick of equipment and pit crews, and said that a lack of technical support forced him to ask a rookie, Donnie Allison, for help setting up his car. Sports Illustrated noted that Andretti's setup favored oversteer (in American parlance, "loose") to an extent that was considered extreme at the time. After convincing the team to give him a top-spec engine, he won the 1967 Daytona 500, but alleged that the team tried to sabotage his race so that its lead driver, Fred Lorenzen, could inherit the win. His friend Parnelli Jones backed up the accusation. Andretti stopped competing in NASCAR after 1969, as race seats at teams of the caliber of Holman-Moody rarely came open after the 1960s.

In the 1970s and 1980s, Andretti competed in six editions of the International Race of Champions (IROC), an invitational stock car series with a limited calendar. He won IROC VI and finished second in IROC III and IROC V. He won three races in twenty events.

== Formula One career ==
=== Part-time roles (1968–1970) ===
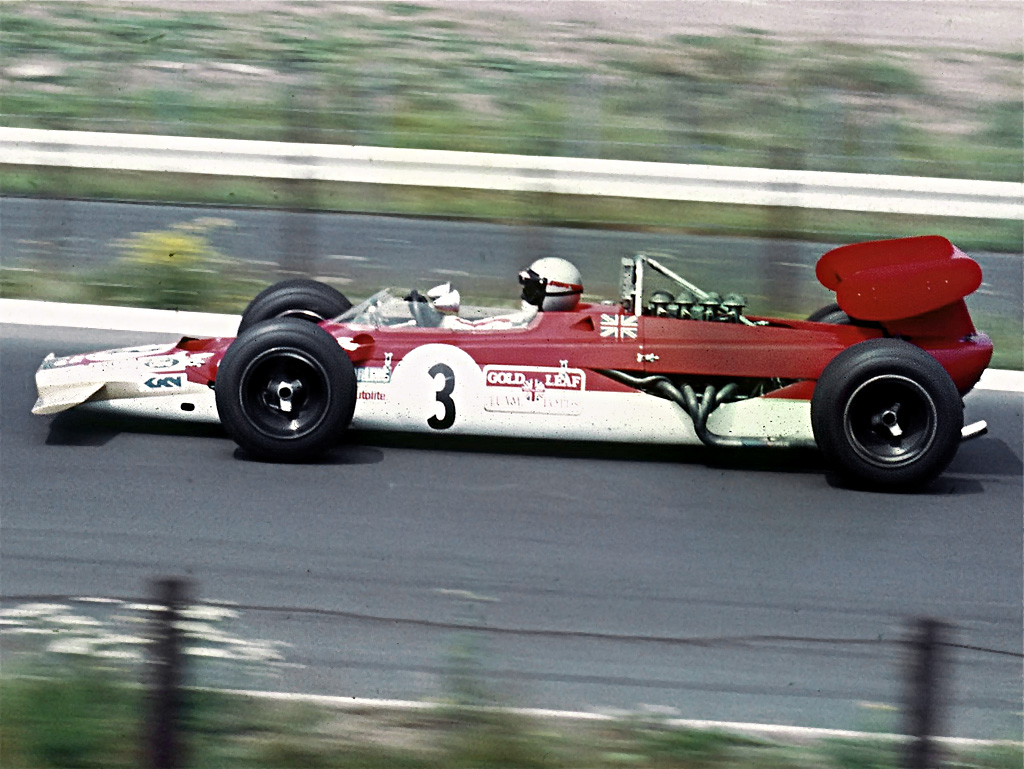
Andretti driving the Lotus 63 at the 1969 German Grand Prix.

Although the Indianapolis 500 dropped off the Formula One calendar in 1960, some teams continued racing at Indianapolis, including Colin Chapman's Team Lotus. At the 1965 Indianapolis 500, Lotus star Jim Clark won and Andretti finished third as the top-placed rookie. On Clark's recommendation, Chapman invited Andretti to race in Formula One, saying, "When you're ready, call me."

Andretti joined Lotus for the 1968 Italian Grand Prix. He was delighted by the Lotus 49B, saying that its handling was a major improvement over IndyCar. He beat the Monza lap record in testing, but was disqualified after flying back to America for a contractually required race. He later said that the Monza officials broke a promise to waive the applicable rule on his behalf.

Andretti got his real start in Formula One at the 1968 United States Grand Prix and took pole. Due to his disqualification at Monza (where he had qualified tenth), he became the first Formula One driver to start his first race from pole. Jackie Stewart overtook him on the first lap, but the two drivers were neck-and-neck until Andretti's nose cone broke, forcing him to pit. He eventually retired with a clutch failure, but he had made a strong impression. Reviewing the race, Motor Sport wrote that Andretti displayed "that same assurance of absolute control [in the corners] one saw in [Jim] Clark's driving."

It's my neck. I put it under the guillotine every time I climb into a race car. So if somebody puts a price on it, I am going to study the sales tag—very carefully.

— Mario Andretti, What's it Like Out There?

At the end of the 1968 season, Chapman offered Andretti a full-time drive to replace Clark, who had died in an accident that April. Andretti declined, not wishing to give up his stable USAC career. For the next two years, he made only sporadic appearances in Formula One with Lotus and STP-March. The cars were mostly uncompetitive, and he finished only one race in his first three seasons. At the one race he finished, the 1970 Spanish Grand Prix, he collected his first Formula One podium after several drivers ahead of him retired with mechanical issues.

=== Ferrari (1971–1972) ===
Andretti signed with Scuderia Ferrari in 1971 and entered seven out of 11 races, completing two. In his Ferrari debut, he achieved his maiden Grand Prix win at Kyalami after race leader Denny Hulme's engine failed with four laps to go. He also won the non-championship Questor Grand Prix in California. Following the Questor win, Enzo Ferrari offered to make Andretti his No. 1 driver for 1972, but Andretti declined, later remarking that "[Formula One] didn't pay much back then [...] but I always figured I'd get another opportunity." Andretti also raced five times in 1972, but scored no podiums. He did not compete in the 1973 season.

=== Parnelli (1974–1976) ===
In the mid-1970s, Andretti encouraged Parnelli, his IndyCar team, to sponsor a Formula One car. To prepare for a Formula One challenge, the team secured funding from Firestone, which agreed to make special tires for the team. In addition to Maurice Philippe, the team hired more Lotus veterans, including Jim Clark's old crew chief Dick Scammell and administrator Andrew Ferguson.

Parnelli ran Andretti in the two North American end-of-season races in 1974. He qualified third at the United States Grand Prix but did not start the race due to a mechanical failure. Parnelli also ran Andretti in the North American Formula 5000 series in 1974 and 1975, both times finishing second to Brian Redman. In each season, Andretti won as many races as Redman, but his results were less consistent.

In 1975, Andretti became a full-time Formula One driver for the first time. He was disappointed by the Parnelli VPJ4, which he felt was derivative of the Lotus 72. More importantly, sponsor Firestone pulled out ahead of the season. The VPJ4 had been designed for Firestone's custom tires, and without them, its performance suffered. The car also suffered from frequent brake failures. At the Spanish Grand Prix, Andretti qualified fourth and reached first after a multi-car crash on the first lap. However, the crash damaged his suspension, forcing his eventual retirement. He finished third at the non-championship 1975 BRDC International Trophy Race. At the Swedish Grand Prix, he was nearly killed when his brakes failed during qualifying, but finished fourth with the team's backup car. He finished 14th in the Drivers' Championship, scoring five points.

Parnelli skipped the first race of the 1976 season, so Andretti started the year with Lotus and returned to Parnelli for the next two races. Parnelli pulled out of Formula One after round three when sponsor Viceroy withdrew funding. Andretti only learned of the decision when a reporter asked him about it as the grid lined up to start the race. He later admitted that "I was the only one, really, that wanted [the Formula One team]."

=== Lotus (1976–1980) ===
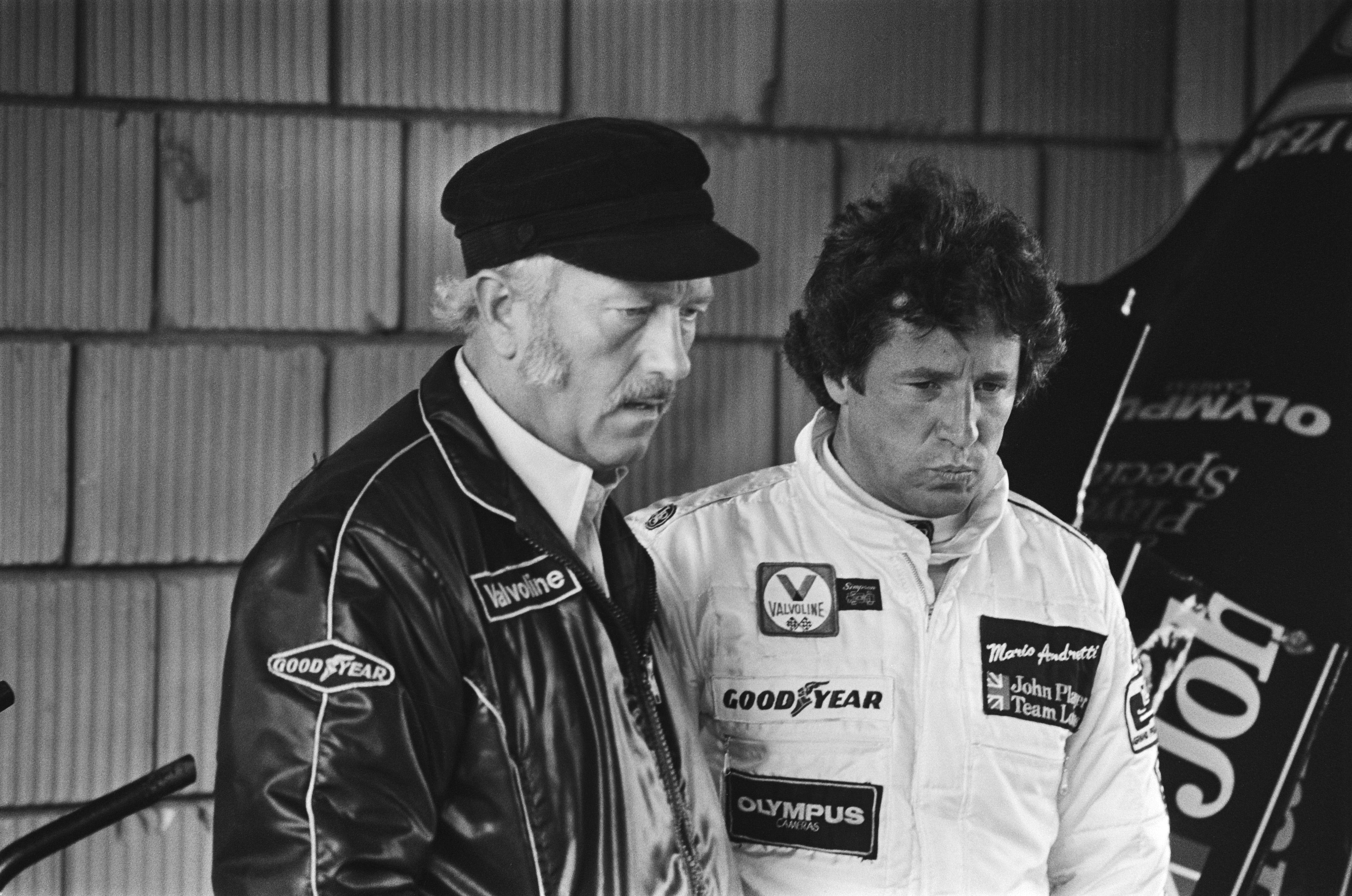
Andretti and Colin Chapman at the 1978 Dutch Grand Prix

==== 1976 ====
The day after Andretti learned Parnelli was shutting down, he met Lotus' Colin Chapman, who told him, "I wish I had a decent car for you." Andretti took the Lotus job anyway, promising Chapman that "we will make the car better." He negotiated for number one driver status, mindful of Chapman's reputation for giving only one driver the best machinery. With this authority, he borrowed his teammate's car when it was faster at a particular circuit, or when his own car was unavailable.

The Lotus 77 was not competitive, and with five races to go, Andretti had scored just five points, leaving him mired in 13th place. He asked to switch to the next year's car in mid-season, but Chapman declined. At the Dutch Grand Prix, Andretti scored his first podium since March 1971. He collected three podiums in the final five races and lapped the field in his victory at the season-ending Japanese Grand Prix. The late-season flurry of results moved Andretti up to 6th in the Drivers' Championship, with 22 points.

===== Ground effect revolution =====
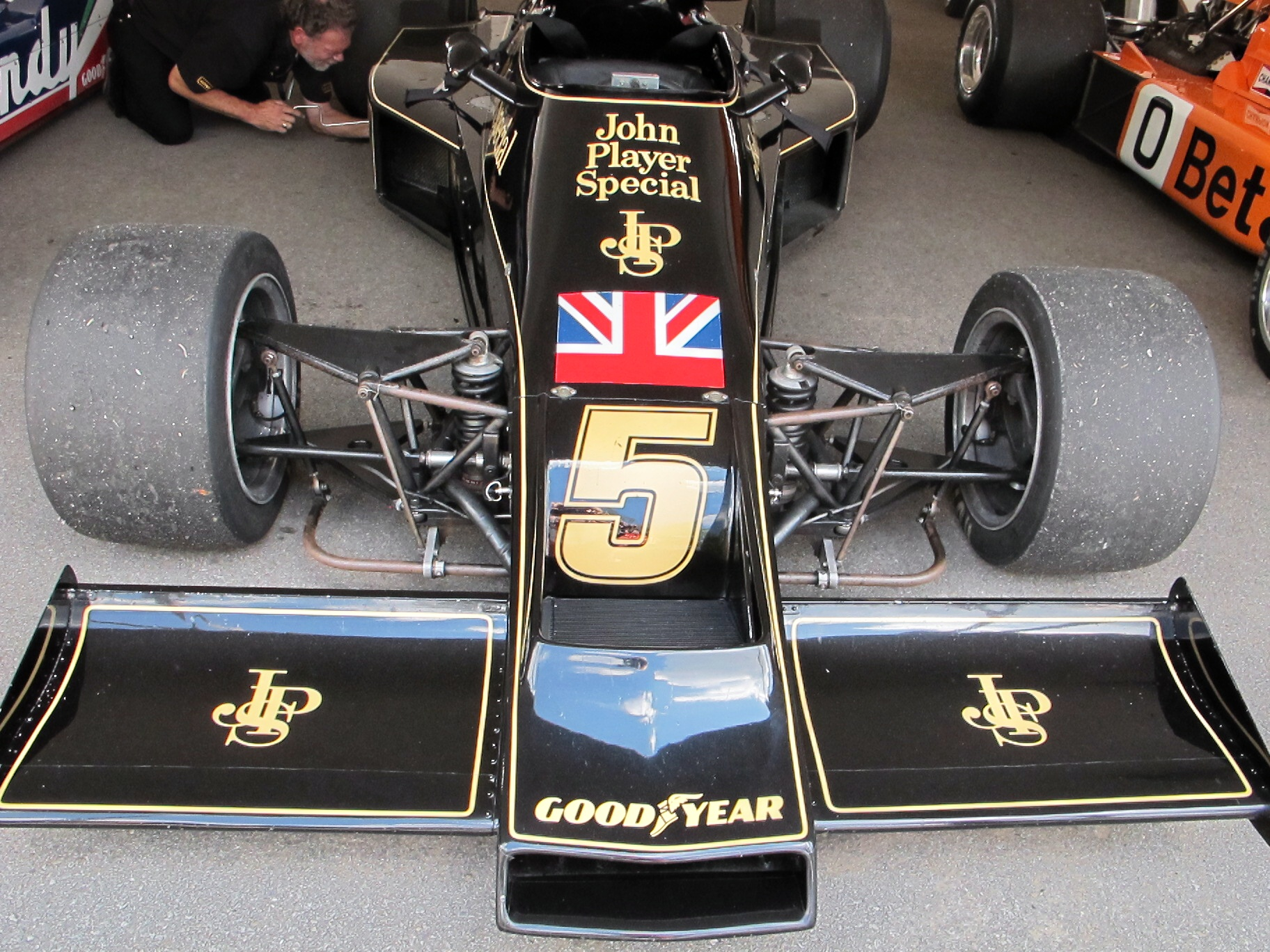
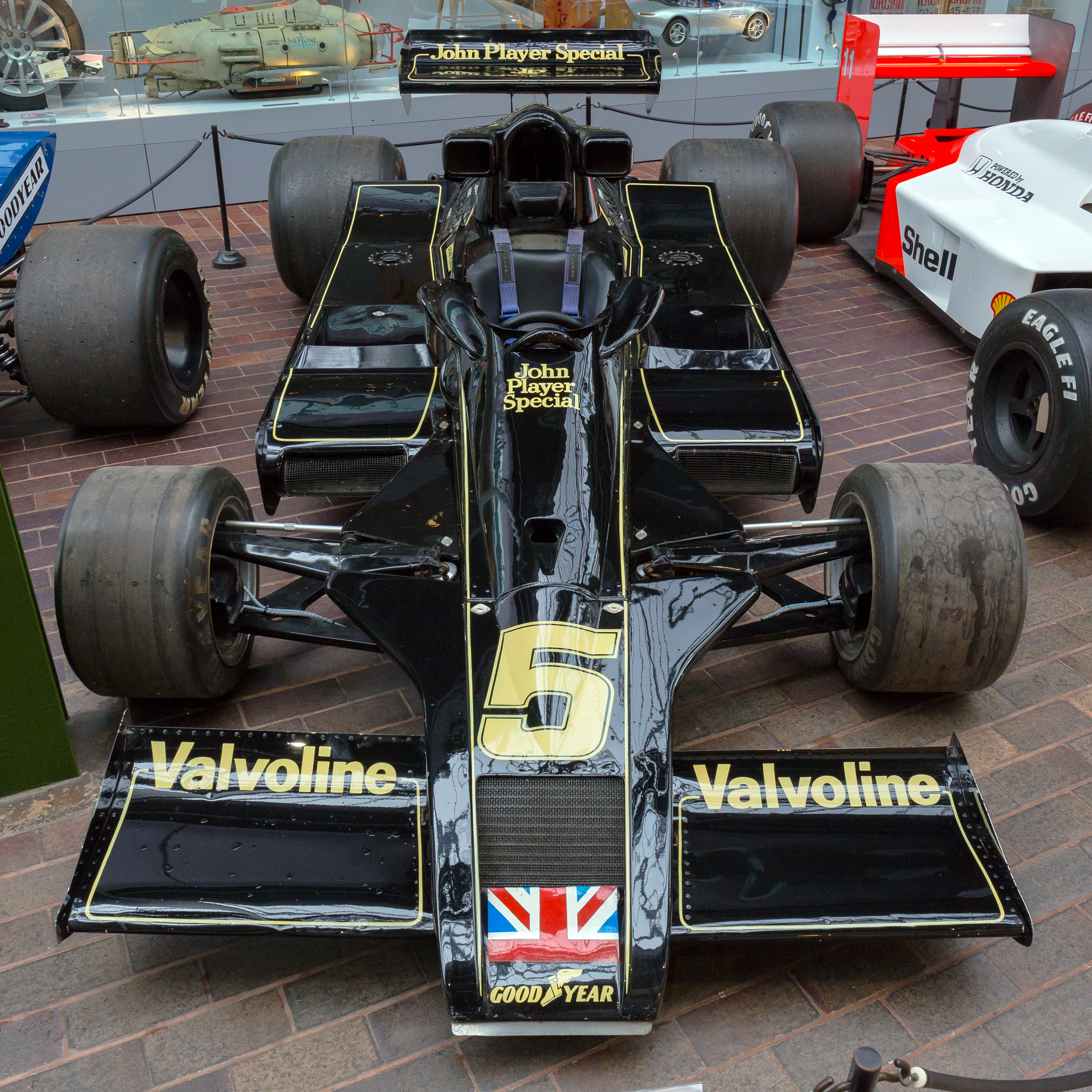
After replacing 1976's unsuccessful Lotus 77 (first image), 1977's Lotus 78 became one of the most influential cars in Formula One history. Its ground effect design dominated the sport until Formula One banned it in 1982, after which Andretti won a CART title with the ground-effect Lola T800. Ground effect cars returned to Formula One in 2022.

Andretti's timing was fortuitous, as he rejoined Lotus at the eve of the ground effect revolution. Since mid-1975, Lotus had been trying to shape the car to generate downforce (making the car faster in the corners) without a large rear wing (whose drag would make the car slower on the straights). The Lotus design team added sidepods with vents to take in air, which was then channeled under the floor to facilitate the Venturi effect. The car was effectively sucked towards the ground, allowing it to take corners at unusually high speeds. Andretti, whose STP-March team had experimented with sidepods in 1970, encouraged the team to make the sidepods even bigger.

Andretti, who received praise on several occasions for his technical feedback, took a close interest in developing the car. He knew that Lotus had a reputation for dangerous designs and worked with his mechanics to ensure that Chapman did not do anything "too radical." Wind tunnel technology was still primitive at the time, but Lotus devised a way to model air flow on track by hiring a photographer to take pictures of wind-sensitive bristles that were mounted on the chassis in tests. While testing the car at Hockenheim, Andretti noticed that the car's downforce was much stronger when he drove close to a nearby fence. Chapman added sideskirts to keep the air flowing in one direction.

Andretti also helped the team with his ability to set up a car; one commentator said that "aside from Andretti, only Lauda was known for great technical understanding [...] an increasingly vital quality for racecar drivers as racecars became increasingly sophisticated." Andretti said that "if people say I'm overly obsessed with setting up my car, that's up to them ... I make tiny adjustments to the car, and I can feel them." Drawing on his extensive USAC oval racing experience, Andretti optimized his cars for each track by exploiting subtle differences in tire size ('stagger') and suspension set-up ('cross weighting') on each side of the car. Engineer Nigel Bennett recalled that Andretti would request seemingly imperceptible adjustments before the race, such as "Lower the front springs by an eighth of a turn."

==== 1977: Reliability issues ====
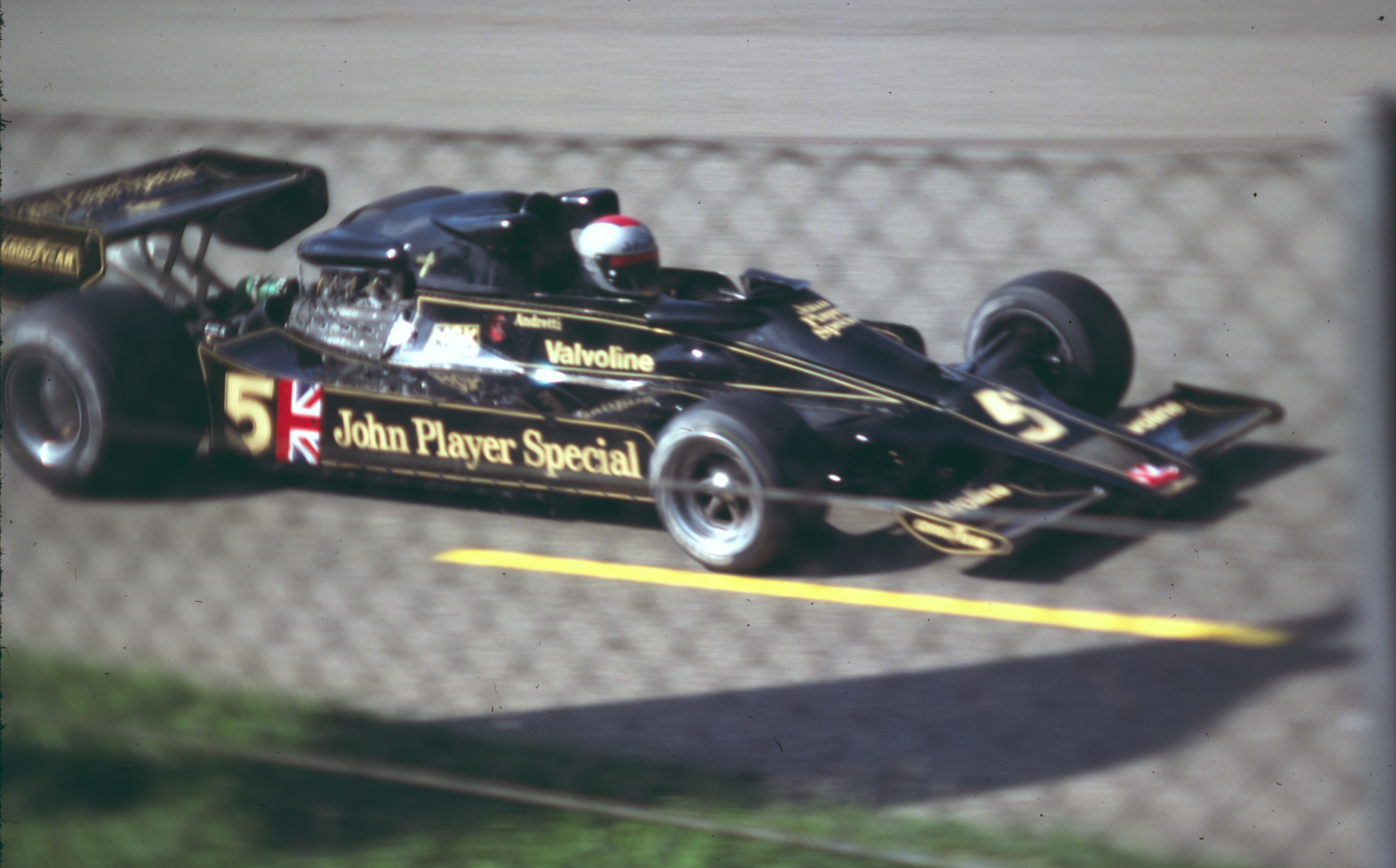
Andretti won his first Italian Grand Prix in 1977, piloting the revolutionary Lotus 78.

In 1977, the Lotus 78 was one of the fastest cars on the grid, and Andretti won four races, more than any other driver. At Zolder, Andretti took pole by 1.54 seconds, infuriating Chapman, who wanted to hide the car's quality from his competitors.

At round four, Andretti won the United States Grand Prix West. He scored a dominant win at the Spanish Grand Prix, but also held his own under close racing, winning the French Grand Prix after a dramatic last-lap pass on John Watson. He also won his first Italian Grand Prix after three attempts, an achievement in which he took great pride. Andretti concluded that the Lotus 78 was his favorite Formula One car, even more than the next year's title-winning Lotus 79.

Other than the wins, Andretti endured a snakebit season. Lotus had commissioned special engines, which proved to be unreliable, and Andretti suffered engine failures while leading at Spielberg, in second at Silverstone, and battling for third at Zandvoort. His engine also failed at Hockenheim. Lotus' Peter Wright and Ralph Bellamy felt that if Chapman had settled for a regular Cosworth DFV engine, Lotus would have won the title. For his own part, Andretti rued Chapman's tendency to "pull the last litre or two of fuel out of the cars before the race," noting that he ran out of fuel at three races in 1977 (Kyalami, Anderstorp, and Mosport). Andretti also retired in third at Interlagos with an electrical failure, and crashed at Zolder while fighting for the lead, which he called "one of the biggest mistakes of [his] career." Ferrari dominated the Constructors' Championship with 95 (97) (Note: At the time, Formula One's scoring system for the Constructors' Championship deducted the worst results from the first nine races of the season and the last eight races of the season. As such, the two points Ferrari scored at the 1977 French Grand Prix did not count towards the season standings.) points to Lotus' 62, and Andretti finished third in the Drivers' Championship, with 47 points, 25 behind Ferrari's Niki Lauda, who skipped the last two races.

==== 1978: World Champion ====
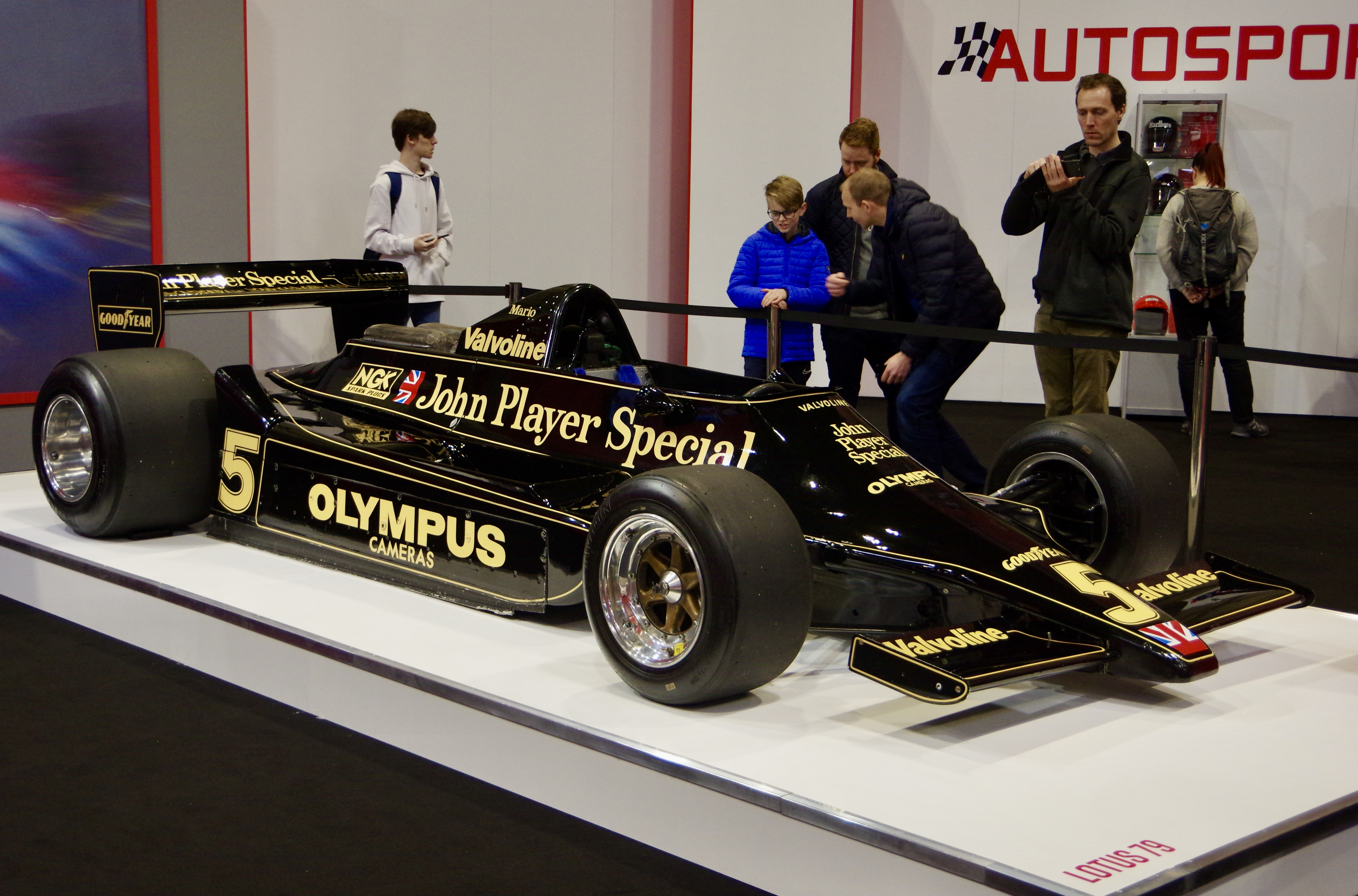
Andretti's title-winning Lotus 79, dubbed the "Black Beauty."

Andretti won his first and only Formula One World Drivers' Championship in 1978. Before the season, the team signed Ronnie Peterson and made him the highest-paid driver in Formula One. Although Chapman agreed to pay Andretti the same salary, Andretti felt that he had earned number one driver status given how much time he had invested to develop the car. Enzo Ferrari offered to double Andretti's salary, but withdrew the offer after Chapman "raised hell with [Enzo]". Chapman placated Andretti by offering him a bonus of $10,000 a point. In addition, Chapman promised to impose team orders to give Andretti the lead if Lotus was leading 1–2.

The team stayed with the 78 for the first five races while Chapman perfected the next car. At the season-opening Argentine Grand Prix, Andretti took pole and led from start to finish. After five races, he was tied for second place in the standings with 18 points, five adrift of Patrick Depailler.

Lotus unveiled the Lotus 79 at the Belgian Grand Prix. The new car included an improved diffuser to facilitate airflow at the back of the car. With plenty of downforce in hand, Lotus ran a small rear wing that increased the car's top speed, fixing what Andretti felt was the 78's biggest weakness. The 79 did introduce a new weakness, as a design flaw overheated the brake fluid. Andretti's smooth driving style suited the car, whose downforce was so great that the chassis might have buckled in the hands of a more choppy driver. At Belgium, Andretti took pole by eight-tenths of a second, led from start to finish, and won by ten seconds.

Andretti dominated the rest of the season, winning five of the next eight races, while teammate Peterson finished second with two wins. Lotus had four 1–2 finishes in 1978, and Andretti won them all, generating speculation that Chapman had ordered Peterson to let Andretti win. Two rounds before Andretti clinched the title, Peterson denied being ordered to let Andretti by at any point, which Andretti repeated after the season. However, Peterson then "ostentatiously" followed Andretti to a 1–2 finish at Zandvoort.

Andretti clinched the championship at the Italian Grand Prix, with two races to go. He did not celebrate, as Peterson had suffered a major crash and died later that night due to complications from leg surgery. Outside the hospital, Andretti laconically said, "Unhappily, motor racing is also this." In 2018, Andretti said that "I could never truly celebrate and I never will. It was an enormous jolt. You never really totally recover from [it]."

==== 1979–1980 ====
Andretti never won another Grand Prix after 1978. Following the 1978 title season, lead sponsor Imperial Tobacco pulled funding. In 1979, the team rolled out the Lotus 80, whose downforce overwhelmed the car's suspension, generating porpoising issues, and whose weak chassis popped out rivets while driving. Andretti scored a podium in the Lotus 80's debut at Jarama. His new teammate Carlos Reutemann refused to drive the car at all, and Andretti drove it only three times before returning to the Lotus 79, which was already out of date. Andretti finished 12th in the standings, with 14 points, 6 points behind Reutemann, who left for Williams after the season.

Following the failure of the Lotus 80, Chapman tried to solve the problem by developing the Lotus 88, a complex and innovative carbon-fiber, dual-chassis structure. In theory, one chassis would absorb the porpoising while the other chassis would carry the driver. The team used a transitional car, the Lotus 81, for 1980, while Chapman developed the 88. Lotus replaced Reutemann with two talented teammates, Elio de Angelis and (briefly) Nigel Mansell, but the team was again unsuccessful. Andretti scored only one point all season. Over the course of the season, he lost faith in the developing Lotus 88, declaring that Chapman "got bored and started going crazy with other things that were outside of the rules." He left Lotus at the end of the season, shortly before Chapman was about to unveil the Lotus 88 for 1981. After his departure, the FIA banned the Lotus 88.

=== Alfa Romeo (1981) ===
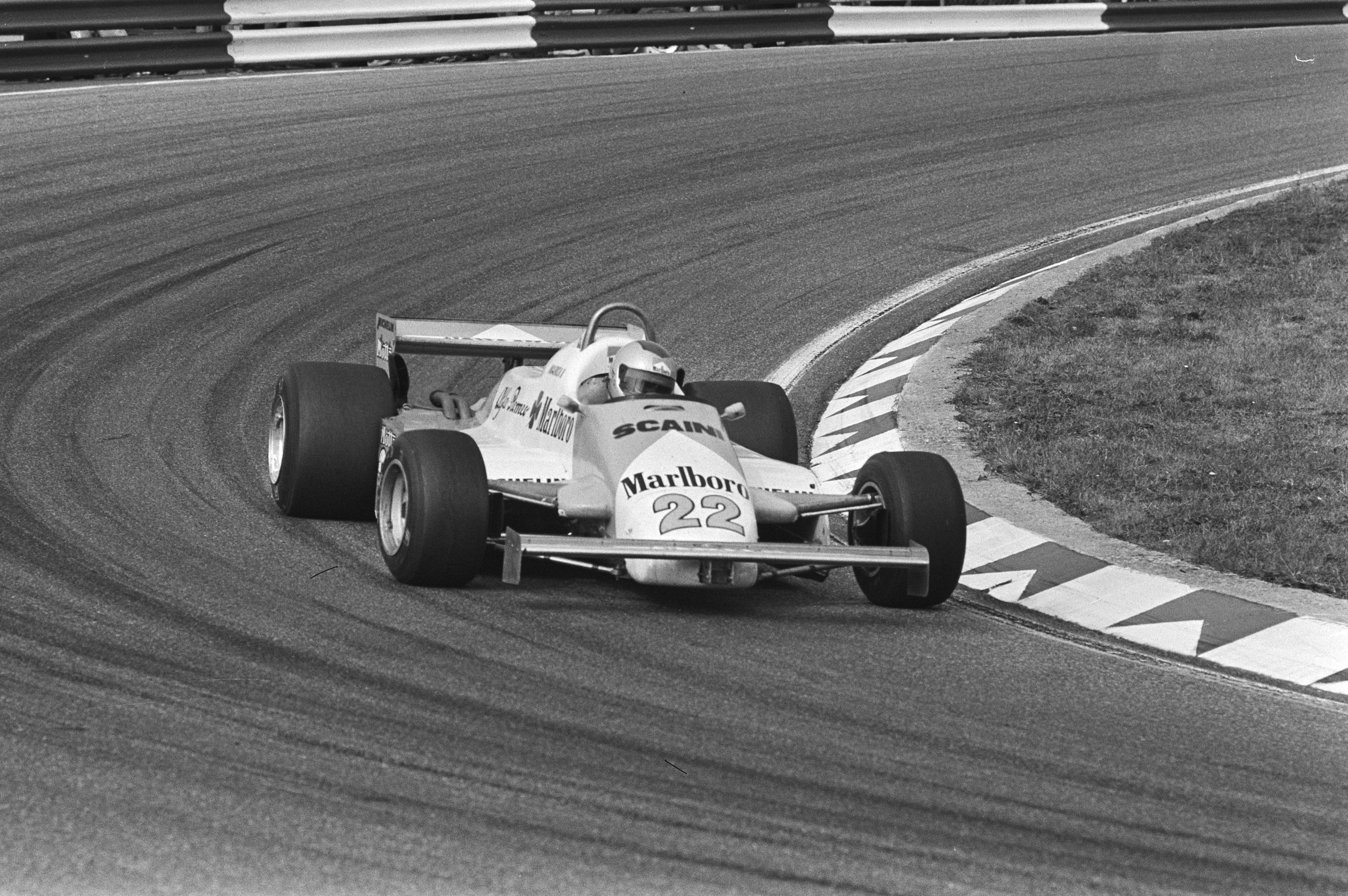
Andretti driving the Alfa Romeo 179C at the 1981 Dutch Grand Prix.

For the 1981 season, Andretti signed a sponsorship deal with Marlboro, whose advertising chief John Hogan gave him a choice between the two Marlboro-sponsored teams, Alfa Romeo and McLaren. Andretti picked the Italian team due to his friendship with one of their engineers and the higher salary on offer. Before the 1981 season, the FIA outlawed sliding sideskirts, which the Alfa Romeo design team had relied on to generate ground effect. Andretti finished fourth on his debut at the United States Grand Prix West, but the team was otherwise uncompetitive. He finished 17th in the Drivers' Championship, with 3 points. He left the team after the season, explaining that the new generation of Formula One cars required "toggle switch driving with no need for any kind of delicacy [...] it made leaving Formula One a lot easier than it would have been."

=== Stand-in appearances (1982) ===
During the 1982 season, Andretti briefly raced for both the Drivers' and Constructors' Championship-winning teams, Williams and Ferrari. Andretti joined Williams for the United States Grand Prix West after Reutemann abruptly quit. He damaged his suspension after contacting a wall and retired. IndyCar commitments prevented him from signing a full-time contract, and Williams' Keke Rosberg won the Drivers' Championship.

Andretti then replaced the injured Didier Pironi at Ferrari for the last two races of the season. He took pole and finished third at the Italian Grand Prix. At the season-ending Caesars Palace Grand Prix, Andretti's final Formula One race, he retired with a suspension failure, but Niki Lauda's engine failure clinched the Constructors' Championship for Ferrari. Andretti agreed to serve as Renault's reserve driver for one U.S. race in 1984, but declined to be considered for a reserve role in 1986, effectively ending his Formula One career.

== CART IndyCar career ==
=== Penske (1979–1980) ===
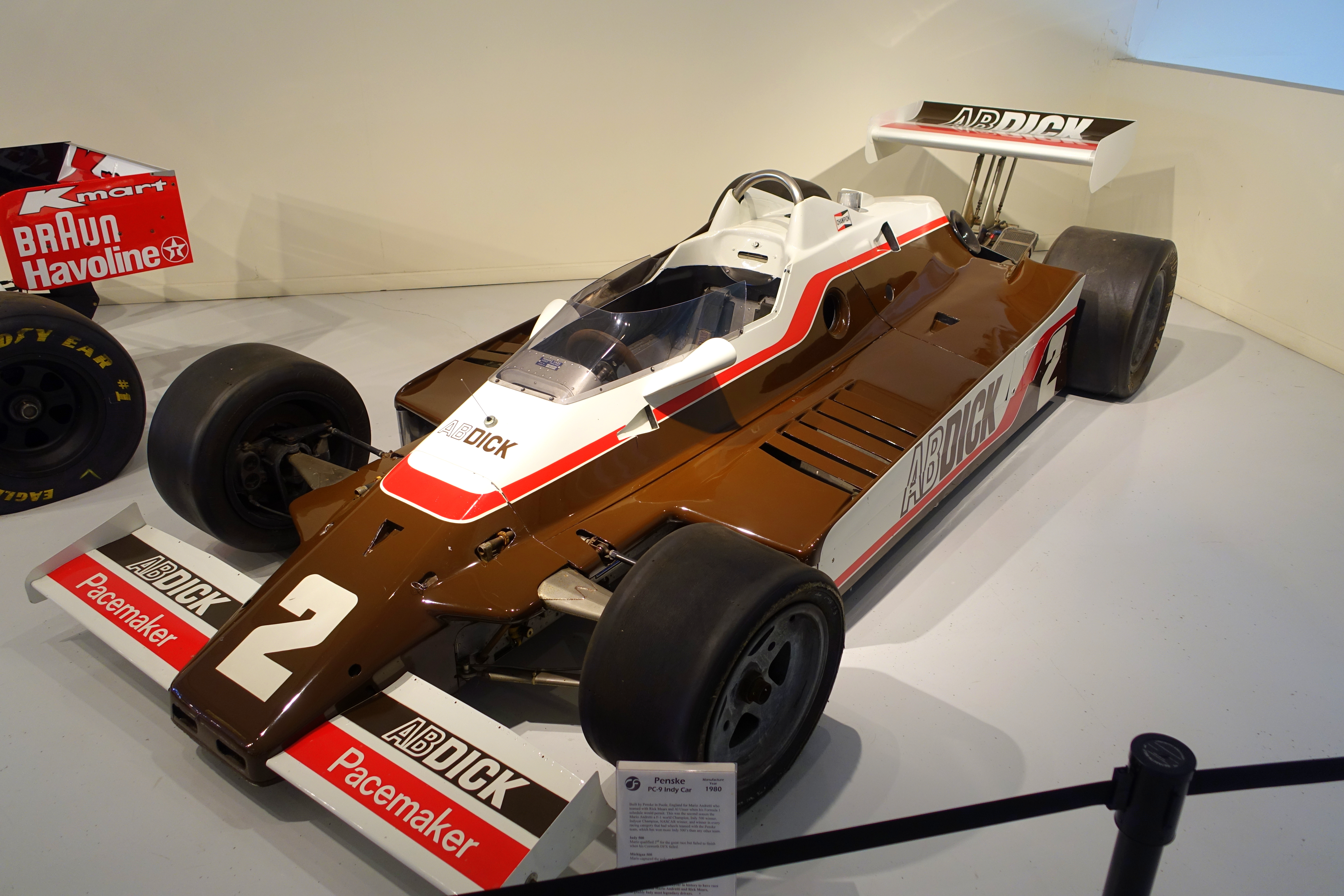
Andretti drove the Penske PC-9 during the 1980 CART season.

In 1979, a new organization, Championship Auto Racing Teams (CART), set up the IndyCar World Series, which displaced the USAC championship. CART was formed because the larger and more institutional IndyCar teams, like Andretti's Penske Racing, wanted the sport to emphasize technical innovation (the costs of which deterred new entrants) and a more structured commercial strategy. After Penske helped start CART, Andretti sporadically competed in CART during the 1979 and 1980 seasons, winning one race at Michigan in 1980.

=== Patrick (1981–1982) ===
Andretti switched to Patrick Racing for the 1981 season. The move reunited him with STP Corporation, the team's sponsor, and Jim McGee, Andretti's mechanic from DVL and Parnelli. He did not win a race, but recorded five top-five finishes in seven races; the other two results were mechanical DNFs. At the 1981 Indianapolis 500, Andretti was controversially stripped of the win four months after the race. After leaving Alfa Romeo, Andretti joined CART full-time for the 1982 season. He finished third in the season standings, with six podiums in 11 races. As with 1981, all his other results were mechanical DNFs.

=== Newman/Haas (1983–1994) ===
In 1983, Andretti joined the new Newman/Haas Racing team, set up by Carl Haas and actor (and former Can-Am team owner) Paul Newman. The team used cars built by British company Lola, in contrast to the March cars in vogue at the time. The team lured Andretti by promising to run only one car, making him the focus of the team. Andretti spent the rest of his full-time racing career with Newman/Haas.

==== Solo-racer era ====
In 1983, Andretti worked with the team to develop the uncompetitive Lola T700 into a decent car. At round six, he took the team's maiden win at Elkhart Lake, and scored another win in Las Vegas. He recorded eight top-five finishes in 13 starts.

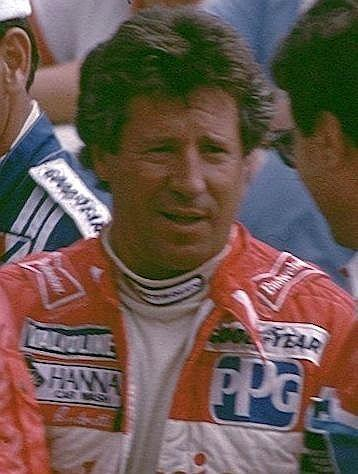
Andretti at the 1984 Pocono 500 in Long Pond, Pennsylvania

In 1984, the team commissioned a new chassis, which became the Lola T800. The car was designed by Lotus veteran Nigel Bennett and effectively utilized the ground effect technology that Formula One had just banned in 1982. (Various CART teams had been attempting to develop ground effect cars since 1980 at the latest.) However, the team got off to a mediocre start. Andretti won the season opener at Long Beach, but his Indianapolis 500 race was compromised by electrical issues, and his wheel fell off at the Milwaukee Mile. After four races, he trailed Tom Sneva by 58 points. In mid-season, however, he won five out of eight races, including the Michigan 500, where he beat Sneva by 0.14 seconds, the closest finish in IndyCar history at the time. After a tight, season-long battle, Andretti closed out the season with two conservative second-place drives, explaining that "I hated driving that way but that's what I had to do." He beat Sneva by 13 points to claim his fourth IndyCar title at the age of 44. At the end of the season, he was voted Driver of the Year for a third time.

The team took a step back in 1985. Other teams noticed that in addition to Andretti's six wins, Danny Sullivan won three races in a customer T800. To make more money, Newman/Haas agreed to distribute the Lolas to more competitors, watering down its technical advantage. Andretti got out to a fast start, winning three of the first four races and finishing second in the fourth, the 1985 Indianapolis 500. After four races, he had a 34-point lead in the standings. However, he recorded only one more top-five finish the rest of the way, and finished fifth in the standings.

From 1986 to 1988, Andretti's son Michael emerged as a force in the sport. In 1986, Michael placed second, beating Mario for the first time. Father and son both scored five poles. At round five in Portland, Mario beat Michael by 0.07 seconds, setting another record for the closest finish in IndyCar history. In addition, at age 46, he finally won his home race, the Pocono 500, after 14 attempts. He called it "one of the happiest weekends [he had] ever had." He led the championship with ten races to go, but did not pick up another podium the rest of the way.

In 1987, with an Adrian Newey-designed chassis and new engines designed by Ilmor, Andretti picked up eight poles but converted them into two wins. He dominated the Indianapolis 500 but dropped out with a blown engine late in the race. At the following race at Milwaukee, he passed A. J. Foyt for the all-time lead in career laps led. However, he crashed when his rear wing came loose and injured his neck. He called it "the hardest hit I've ever taken."

In 1988, Andretti finished fifth in the season standings, one spot ahead of Michael. He picked up two wins, but continued to suffer from reliability issues and was involved in several costly accidents.

==== Two-car era ====
Michael Andretti joined Newman/Haas in 1989, which added a second car for the first time to accommodate him. Mario and Michael became the first father/son team to compete in both IMSA GT and IndyCar racing. Michael reached the peak of his career, winning the 1991 championship and finishing second in 1990 and 1992. By contrast, Mario performed well but not brilliantly. During the 63 races from 1989 to 1992, he scored 30 top-five finishes but recorded no wins. In 1992, he set the all-time record for most IndyCar starts, passing A. J. Foyt.

Ahead of the 1993 season, Michael Andretti left CART for Formula One. Mario wanted to return to the old one-car system, but the team replaced Michael with the reigning Formula One champion, Nigel Mansell, and gave Mansell number one driver status. Mansell and Andretti raced as teammates for two years, but did not get along, owing to their mutual competitiveness and personality differences. Andretti scored his last IndyCar win during the 1993 Phoenix race. At 53 years and 34 days old, he became the oldest recorded winner of an IndyCar event. Later that year, he qualified on pole at the Michigan 500 with a speed of 234.275 miles per hour (377.029 km/h), setting a new closed-course world record. He finished sixth in the season standings, while Mansell won the title.

Andretti decided to race one final season, dubbed "The Arrivederci Tour." In 1994, the team as a whole took a step back, and Newman/Haas went winless for the first time. At his 407th, and final, IndyCar race, at Laguna Seca, Andretti's race was initially derailed by a flat tire, but he weaved his way back up to seventh. His engine failed with four laps to go. At the time of his retirement, his 52 wins were the second-most in history, behind only A. J. Foyt's 67. (Scott Dixon passed him in 2022.) His 7,595 laps led remain the all-time record, nearly 1,000 laps higher than second-placed Michael Andretti's 6,692. His 67 pole positions were the all-time record. (Will Power passed him in 2022.)

=== Indianapolis 500 ===
Andretti won once at the Indianapolis 500 in 29 attempts, despite three pole positions and seven top-three grid placements. He finished all 500 miles (800 km) just five times, and quipped that "if it had been the Indy 400, I'd have had at least six." He had so many incidents and near victories at the track that critics have suggested the existence of an "Andretti Curse."

Andretti occasionally did well at Indianapolis. He won the 1969 race, but benefited from good luck: he completed the race in the team's backup car, a now-outdated Brawner Hawk, and on just one set of tires. His race engineer said that the Hawk's gearbox was failing and would not have lasted another five laps. He was also the first driver to exceed 200 miles per hour (320 km/h), during practice for the 1977 race.

Starting in 1981, Andretti encountered several out-of-the-ordinary instances of bad luck at the Indianapolis 500. In 1981, he lost after Bobby Unser passed cars under caution. In 1985, he finished second to Danny Sullivan, who miraculously spun without crashing. In 1987, he led 170 of the first 177 laps but slowed down to preserve his engine, which ironically caused the engine to fail. In 1992, he broke six toes, his son Jeff broke both legs, and his son Michael lost a 28-second lead with 12 laps to go due to a mechanical failure. Finally, in his last serious chance at a win in 1993, he led the most laps, but his race was derailed after the team incorrectly changed the tire stagger on his car during a late pit stop. In addition, in 2003, the 63-year-old Andretti tested the injured Tony Kanaan's car at Indianapolis but got into a "spectacular" airborne crash when Kenny Bräck crashed in front of him; he escaped with minor injuries. Reflecting on the curse in 2019, Andretti said that while he "think[s] about all the times [he] should have won here," he also won in 1969, "when everything went wrong."

== Sportscar racing career ==
=== North American endurance racing ===
Andretti's first race in a sportscar was in 1965, when he piloted a Ferrari 275 P at the Bridgehampton 500 km at Bridgehampton; he did not finish. Andretti won three 12 Hours of Sebring endurance races (1967, 1970, 1972), and a 6-hour race at Daytona in 1972. In early sportscar races he competed for Holman-Moody, but later often drove for Ferrari.

Andretti signed with Ferrari in 1971, and won several races with co-driver Jacky Ickx. In 1972, he shared wins in the three North American rounds of the championship and at Brands Hatch in the UK, helping Ferrari to a dominant victory in that year's World Championship for Makes. He also competed in 25 North American Can-Am races in the late 1960s and early 1970s, with a best finish of third place at Riverside in 1969.

=== Le Mans ===
Andretti competed at the 24 Hours of Le Mans in four decades. In 1966, he shared a Holman-Moody Ford Mk II with Lucien Bianchi. They retired due to valve failure. In 1967, during a 3:30 am pit stop, a mechanic accidentally installed a front brake pad backwards, causing Andretti's brakes to lock up at the Dunlop Bridge. He crashed, broke several ribs, and was left exposed to oncoming traffic, but Roger McCluskey pulled him to safety.

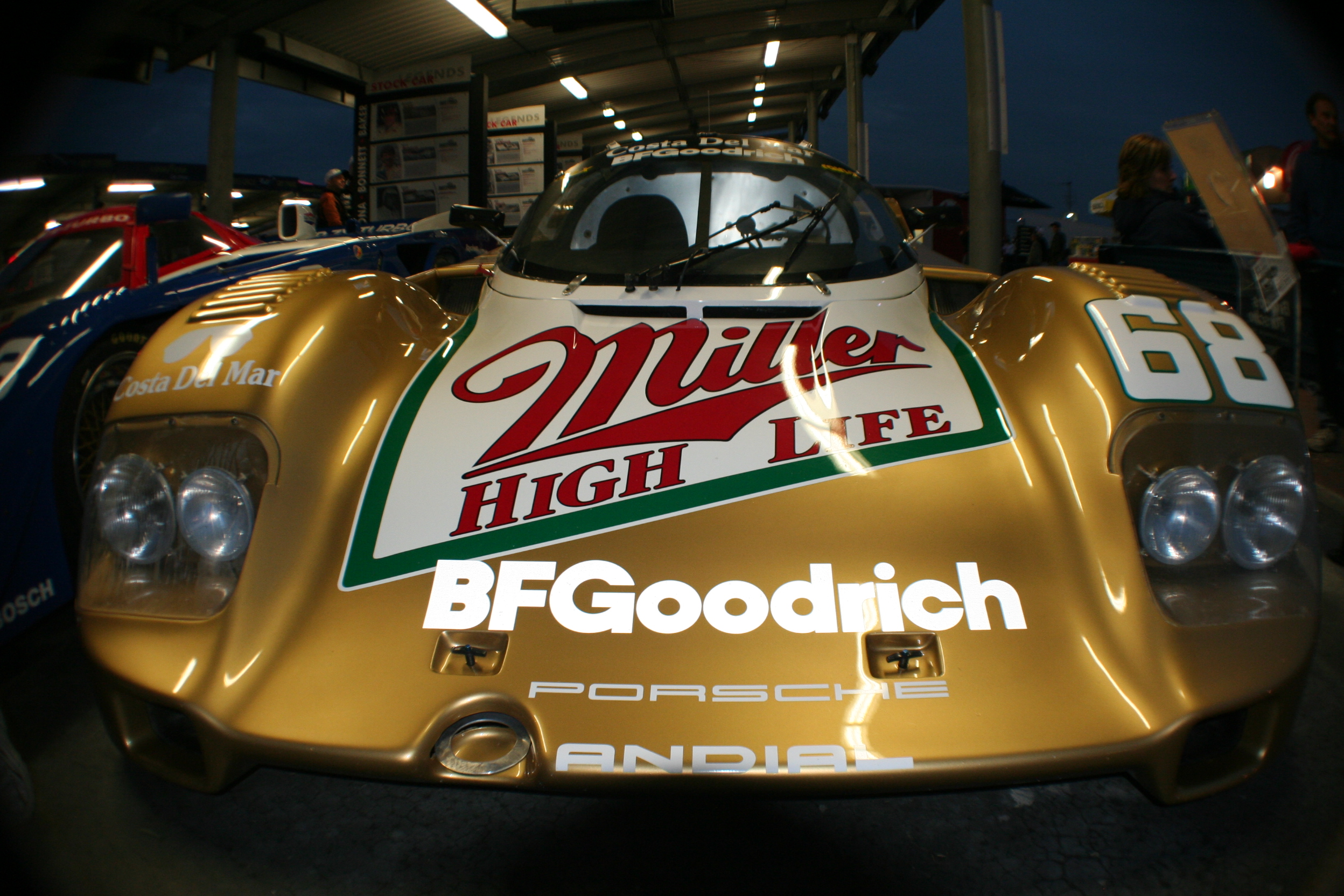
Andretti's 1988 Porsche 962, co-driven with son Michael.

Andretti did not return to Le Mans until ending his full-time Formula One career. In 1982, he partnered with son Michael in a Mirage M12 Ford. They qualified in ninth place, but although their car passed initial inspection several days earlier, it was disqualified shortly before the race started due to an improper oil cooler. They returned the following year and finished third in a Porsche customer car, behind two works Porsches. The Andrettis returned in 1988 with Mario's nephew John added to the family team. Although they obtained a factory Porsche 962, one of the car's engine cylinders failed, and the team finished fifth.

Following Andretti's retirement from full-time racing, he decided to try for another Le Mans victory, joining Courage Compétition from 1995 to 1997. In 1995, the team qualified third, but Andretti was brake-checked by the car in front of him and crashed, forcing him to pit and costing the team six laps. The team eventually rallied from 25th to second in the overall classification, and finished first in the LMP1 class. Andretti later said that the team "lost [the 1995] race five times over" through poor organization, including a botched pit stop, an ill-considered switch to wet-weather tires, and a two-minute pit stop to wash the car to clean up the sponsor decals. Porsche withdrew active support from Courage in 1996, and the team finished 16th after losing 90 minutes in the pits fixing an electronic issue and a broken axle. In 1997, the "now ancient Courage" was a backmarker and the team did not finish the race. Andretti's final appearance at Le Mans was at the 2000 race, six years after his retirement from full-time racing. The 60-year-old Andretti drove the Panoz LMP-1 Roadster-S to a 15th-place finish.

== Awards and honors ==
=== Legacy ===
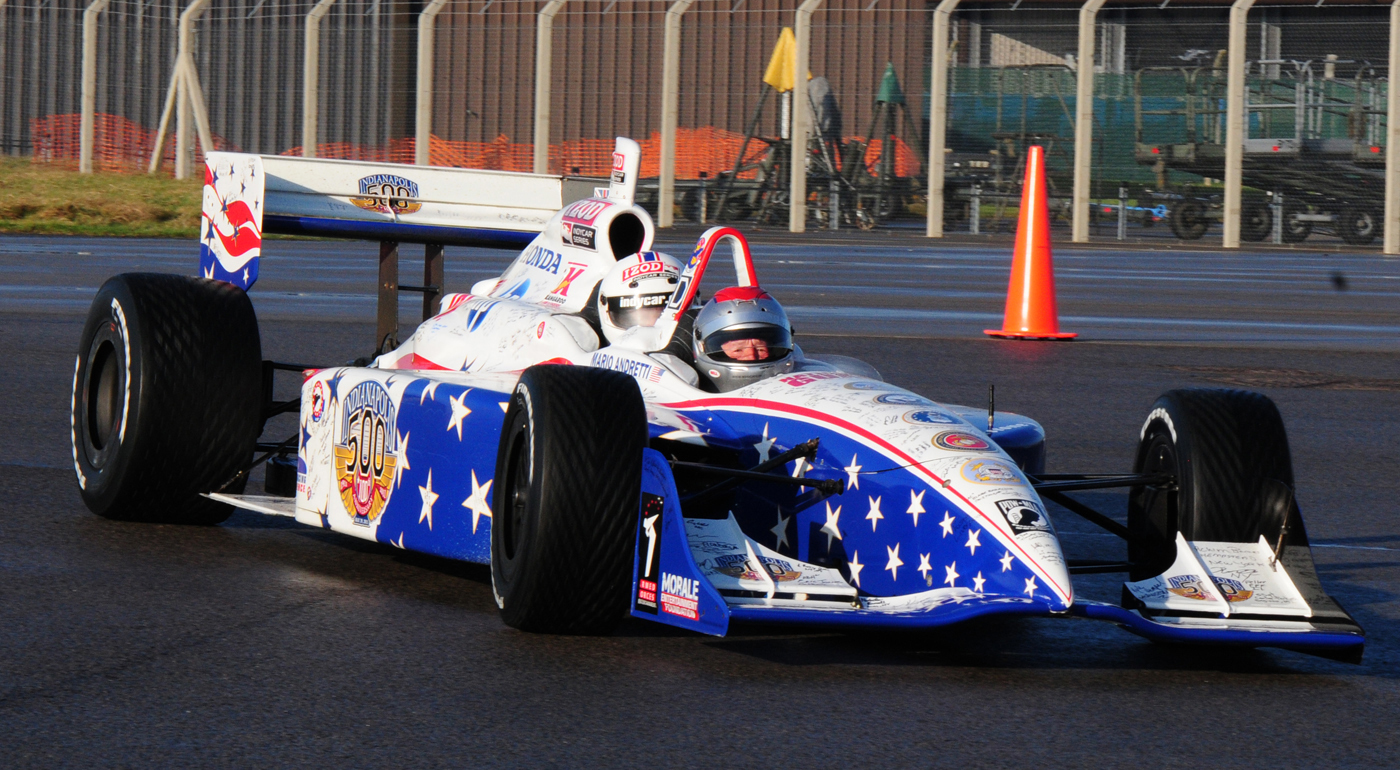
Andretti has regularly driven the two seater IndyCar before races since his retirement.

Over the course of his long career, Andretti won over 100 races on major circuits, although the exact numbers vary depending on the definition of a major circuit. The International Motorsports Hall of Fame puts the total at either 109 or 111, while Andretti and the Automotive Hall of Fame put the total at 111.

Andretti's name has become synonymous with speed in American popular culture. An extremely versatile driver, Andretti stands alone, or close to it, in several lists of drivers to win in multiple categories:

- Only driver to win the Indianapolis 500 (1969), Daytona 500 (1967), and the Formula One World Drivers' Championship (1978) (as of 2025).
- One of only two drivers (including Dan Gurney) to have won races in Formula One, IndyCar, the World Sportscar Championship, and NASCAR (as of 2019).
- One of only three drivers to have won major races on road courses, paved ovals, and dirt tracks in one season, a feat that he accomplished four times (as of 2007).

With his final IndyCar win in April 1993, Andretti became the first driver to have won IndyCar races in four different decades and the first to win automobile races of any kind in five. As of 2024, Andretti's victory at the 1978 Dutch Grand Prix is the most recent Formula One win by an American driver.

=== Awards ===
Mario Andretti career wins
Competition	Wins
American Championship Car (IndyCar)	52
USAC Silver Crown Series	5
Formula One	12
F1 Non-Championship	1
Formula 5000	7
Sports car	7
Stock car	2
IROC	3
USAC Sprint Car	9
Midget Car	9
3/4 Midget Car	4

Andretti was named Driver of the Century by the Associated Press (1999) and RACER magazine (2000). In 1992, he was voted the U.S. Driver of the Quarter Century by a panel of journalists and former U.S. Drivers of the Year. He was named the U.S. Driver of the Year in 1967, 1978, and 1984, and is the only driver to be Driver of the Year in three decades.

Andretti has been inducted into a variety of motorsports hall of fames, including the International Motorsports Hall of Fame in 2000. Other halls of fame include the Indianapolis Motor Speedway Hall of Fame (1986), the Motorsports Hall of Fame of America (1990), the U.S. National Sprint Car Hall of Fame (1996), the Automotive Hall of Fame (2005), the USAC Hall of Fame (2012), the FIA Hall of Fame (2017), and the U.S. National Midget Auto Racing Hall of Fame (2019).

Various race tracks have named areas after Andretti, including "The Andretti" (the final turn of the Circuit of the Americas), the "Andretti Hairpin" (turn 2 at Laguna Seca), and the "Andretti Road" (the grandstand driveway at Pocono). Indianapolis renamed a portion of a street "Mario Andretti Drive" in 2019 to celebrate the 50th anniversary of his 1969 Indianapolis 500 win. Nazareth, Pennsylvania renamed Andretti's home street of Market Street to "Victory Lane" after he won the Indianapolis 500.

In 2003, the Champ Car World Series race at Road America was renamed the "Mario Andretti Grand Prix" after Andretti helped broker a deal to keep it on the CCWS calendar. Andretti has also been honored by the Vince Lombardi Cancer Foundation (2007) and the Simeone Foundation (2008).

On October 23, 2006, the Italian government made Andretti a Commendatore of the Order of Merit of the Italian Republic (OMRI), the most senior Italian order of merit, in honor of Andretti's racing career and commitment to his Italian heritage. In 2008, Andretti was also named the honorary mayor of an association of Italian exiles from Andretti's birthplace of Montona. Andretti has also received the Carnegie Corporation's Great Immigrants Award (2006, the inaugural class); the Italy–USA Foundation's America Award (2015); and honorary citizenship of Lucca, Italy (2016). In 2004, he was the grand marshal of the New York City Columbus Day Parade.

== Personal life ==
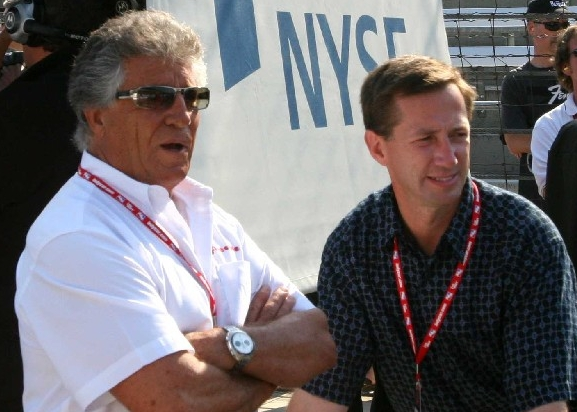
Mario (left) with nephew John at the 2007 Indianapolis 500.

Andretti lives in Bushkill Township, Pennsylvania, a suburb of Nazareth, on an estate that he named "Villa Montona" in honor of his birthplace. His late wife Dee Ann (née Hoch) was a native of Nazareth. They met when Dee Ann was teaching Andretti English in 1961. They were married on November 25, 1961, and had three children (Michael, Jeff, and Barbara) and seven grandchildren. Dee Ann died on July 2, 2018, following a heart attack.

=== Andretti racing family ===
Both of Mario Andretti's sons, Michael and Jeff, were auto racers. Michael joined CART in 1983 and won the 1991 title; he also finished second on five occasions. He was U.S. Driver of the Year in 1991, and was third on the all-time IndyCar career wins list when he retired. Jeff Andretti competed in CART from 1990 to 1994. Mario's nephew John Andretti competed in CART and NASCAR, winning one CART race in 1991 and two NASCAR races in 1997 and 1999. In addition, in 2006, Mario's grandson Marco won the Indy Racing League Rookie of the Year award and the Indianapolis 500 Rookie of the Year Award, as Mario, Michael, and Jeff had done before him.

During the 1991 CART season, the Andrettis became the first family to have four relatives compete in the same series. In addition, the Andrettis have competed as a team in endurance racing. Mario, Michael, and John finished 6th at the 1988 24 Hours of Le Mans. Mario, Michael, and Jeff finished 5th at the 1991 Rolex 24 at Daytona.

=== Business ===
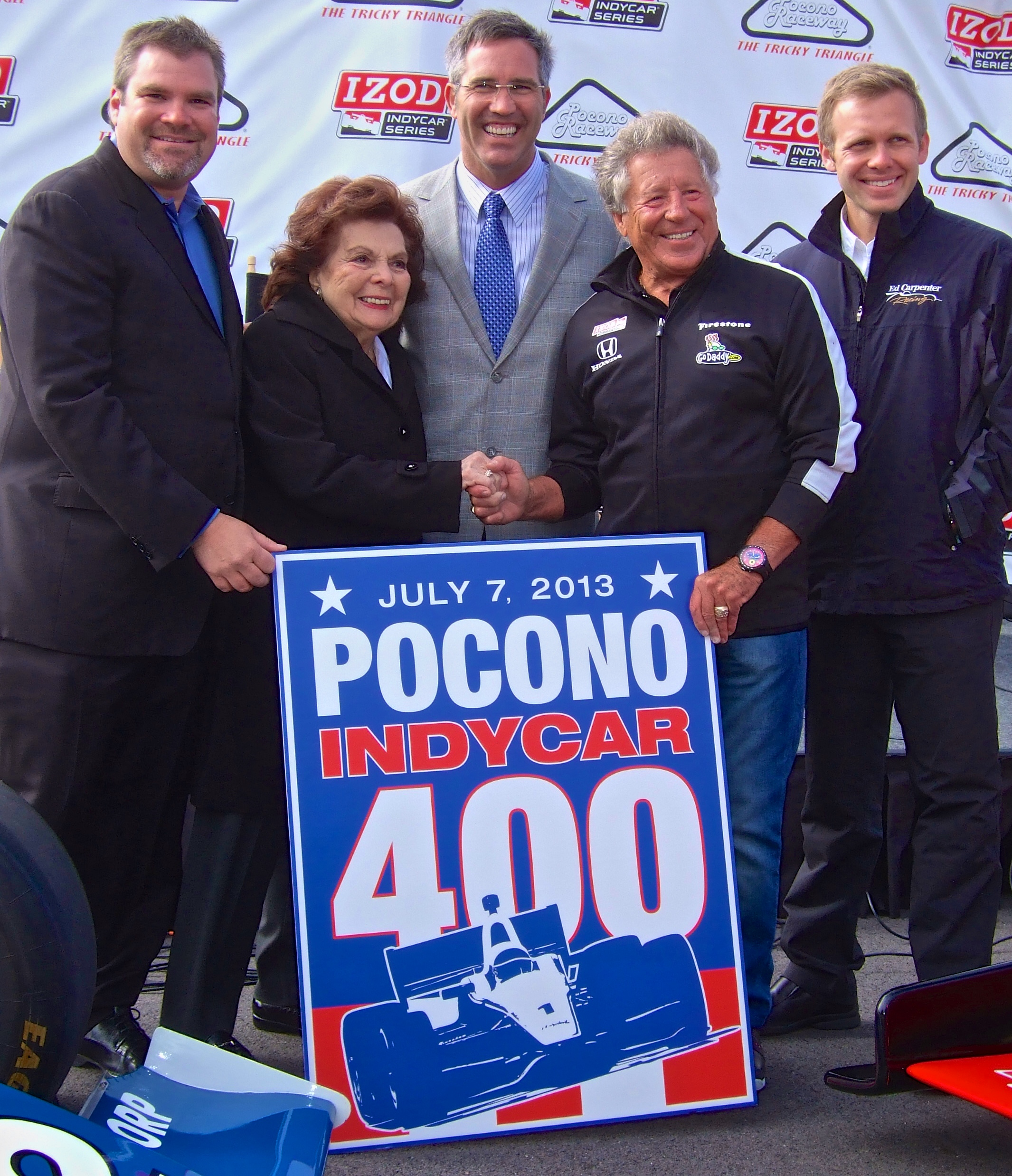
Andretti (second from right) in 2011, announcing the return of Pocono Raceway to the IndyCar Series schedule

Following his retirement, Andretti has remained active in the racing community. He serves on the board of the Cadillac Formula One team, which joined Formula One in 2026. Since 2012, Andretti has been the official ambassador for the Circuit of the Americas (COTA) and the United States Grand Prix. In the media, Andretti test drives cars for Road & Track and Car and Driver magazines and has penned a racing column for the Indianapolis Star. He also participated in the 2006 Bullrun Rally from New York to Los Angeles.

Andretti's business interests extend beyond racing. When he retired at age 54, his personal fortune was estimated at $100 million. In 1995, Andretti and Joe Antonini saved a struggling Napa Valley vineyard and renamed it the Andretti Winery. Andretti was interviewed about his winemaking activities for the documentary A State of Vine (2007). In 1997, he founded Andretti Petroleum, which owns a chain of gasoline stations and car washes in Northern California. He also owns a chain of go-kart tracks. He was the title character of several video games, including Mario Andretti's Racing Challenge (1991), Mario Andretti Racing (1994), and Andretti Racing (1996/1997), the latter in association with his sons.

== Film and television appearances ==
Andretti has contributed to several racing films. He features in and partially narrates The Speed Merchants (1972), a documentary about the 1972 World Sportscar Championship, in which Andretti's Ferrari won the constructors' championship. He also drove an IndyCar in the IMAX film Super Speedway (1996). He also appeared in the documentary Dust to Glory (2005), which discusses a race in which he served as grand marshal. In November 2015, he appeared on the first season of TV series Jay Leno's Garage, driving Leno in multiple fast cars and talking about his racing career.

Andretti has also made cameo or guest appearances in other media, generally associated with racing. Like many other IndyCar drivers, he guested on the television show Home Improvement. He cameoed in Bobby Deerfield (1977); Pixar's Cars (2006) (an animated film where he was represented by a sentient version of the Ford Fairlane in which he won the 1967 Daytona 500); and DreamWorks' Turbo (2013) (where he voiced the traffic director at Indianapolis Motor Speedway).

== Racing record ==
=== Racing career summary ===
Season	Series	Team	Races	Wins	Poles	F/Laps	Podiums	Points	Position
1964	USAC Championship Car	Dean Van Lines Racing Division	8	0	0	0	1	530	11th
1964	USAC Championship Car	Lee S Glessner	1	0	0	0	0	530	11th
1964	USAC Championship Car	Doug Stearly	1	0	0	0	0	530	11th
1965	USAC Championship Car	Dean Van Lines Racing Division	16	1	3	?	10	3110	**1st**
1966	USAC Championship Car	Dean Van Lines Racing Division	14	8	9	?	9	3070	**1st**
1966	USAC Championship Car	Jim Robbins	1	0	0	0	0	3070	**1st**
1966	NASCAR Grand National Series	Owens Racing	4	0	0	0	0	N/A	NC
1966	24 Hours of Le Mans	Holman & Moody	1	0	0	0	0	N/A	DNF
1967	USAC Championship Car	Dean Van Lines Racing Division	19	8	4	?	13	3360	**2nd**
1967	NASCAR Grand National Series	Holman & Moody	6	1	0	?	1	N/A	51st
1967	World Sportscar Championship	Ford Motor Co.	2	1	?	1	1	N/A	NC
1968	USAC Championship Car	Andretti Racing Enterprises	27	4	8	?	16	4319	**2nd**
1968	NASCAR Grand National Series	Holman & Moody	3	0	0	?	0	N/A	51st
1968	Formula One	Gold Leaf Team Lotus	1	0	1	0	0	0	NC
1968	World Sportscar Championship	Autodelta SpA	1	0	0	0	0	0	6th
1969	USAC Championship Car	STP Corporation	24	9	5	?	13	5055	**1st**
1969	Can-Am	Holman & Moody	4	0	0	0	1	22	11th
1969	Formula One	Gold Leaf Team Lotus	3	0	0	0	0	NC	0
1969	NASCAR Grand National Series	Holman & Moody	1	0	0	0	0	NC	0
1970	USAC Championship Car	STP Corporation	18	1	4	?	4	1890	5th
1970	Formula One	STP Corporation	5	0	0	0	1	4	15th
1970	Can-Am	SEFAC Ferrari	1	0	0	0	0	8	23rd
1971	USAC Championship Car	STP Corporation	10	0	0	?	1	1370	9th
1971	Formula One	SEFAC Ferrari	5	1	0	1	1	12	8th
1971	Can-Am	SEFAC Ferrari	1	0	0	0	0	10	19th
1972	USAC Championship Car	Vel's Parnelli Jones Racing	10	0	1	?	2	1135	11th
1972	Formula One	SEFAC Ferrari	5	0	0	0	0	4	12th
1973	USAC Championship Car	Vel's Parnelli Jones Racing	15	1	1	?	3	2400	5th
1974	USAC Championship Car	Vel's Parnelli Jones Racing	11	0	1	?	1	655	15th
1974	SCCA Continental Championship	Vel's Parnelli Jones Racing	7	3	6	2	5	97	**2nd**
1974	Formula One	Vel's Parnelli Jones Racing	2	0	0	0	0	0	NC
1974	World Sportscar Championship	Autodelta	1	0	0	0	0	0	NC
1975	Formula One	Vel's Parnelli Jones Racing	12	0	0	1	0	5	14th
1975	SCCA Continental Championship	Vel's Parnelli Jones Racing	9	4	8	2	5	165	**2nd**
1975	USAC Championship Car	Vel's Parnelli Jones Racing	3	0	0	0	0	210	23rd
1975	USAC Championship Car	Sugaripe Prune Racing Team	1	0	0	0	1	210	23rd
1976	Formula One	John Player Team Lotus	13	1	1	1	3	22	6th
1976	Formula One	Vel's Parnelli Jones Racing	2	0	0	0	0	22	6th
1976	USAC Championship Car	Penske Racing	4	0	0	?	1	1200	9th
1977	Formula One	John Player Team Lotus	17	4	7	4	5	47	**3rd**
1977	USAC Championship Car	Penske Racing	6	0	0	?	1	1580	7th
1978	Formula One	John Player Team Lotus	16	6	8	3	7	64	**1st**
1978	USAC Championship Car	Penske Racing	8	1	0	?	1	681	17th
1979	Formula One	Martini Racing Team Lotus	14	0	0	0	1	14	12th
1979	BMW M1 Procar Championship	BMW Motorsport	3	0	0	0	0	2	27th
1979	PPG Indy Car World Series	Penske Racing	1	0	0	?	1	700	11th
1980	Formula One	Team Essex Lotus	14	0	0	0	0	1	20th
1980	PPG Indy Car World Series	Penske Racing	4	1	2	?	2	580	16th
1980	USAC Championship Car	Penske Racing	2	0	0	?	0	40	37th
1980	BMW M1 Procar Championship	BMW Motorsport	1	0	0	?	0	0	NC
1981	Formula One	Marlboro Team Alfa Romeo	15	0	0	0	0	3	17th
1981	PPG Indy Car World Series	Patrick Racing	7	0	1	?	4	81	11th
1981–82	USAC Championship Car	Patrick Racing	2	0	0	?	1	805	6th
1982	PPG Indy Car World Series	Patrick Racing	11	0	0	?	6	188	**3rd**
1982	Formula One	Ferrari	2	0	1	0	1	4	19th
1982	Formula One	TAG Williams Team	1	0	0	0	0	4	19th
1982	24 Hours of Le Mans	Grand Touring Cars Inc.	1	0	0	0	0	N/A	DNS
1982-83	USAC Championship Car	Newman/Haas Racing	1	0	0	?	0	15	32nd
1983	PPG Indy Car World Series	Newman/Haas Racing	13	2	2	2	6	133	**3rd**
1983	24 Hours of Le Mans	Porsche Kremer Racing	1	0	0	0	1	N/A	**3rd**
1983-84	USAC Championship Car	Newman/Haas Racing	1	0	0	?	0	20	20th
1984	PPG Indy Car World Series	Newman/Haas Racing	16	6	8	6	8	176	**1st**
1984	IMSA GT Championship	Porsche AG	1	0	1	0	0	N/A	NC
1985	PPG Indy Car World Series	Newman/Haas Racing	14	3	3	3	5	114	5th
1986	PPG Indy Car World Series	Newman/Haas Racing	17	2	3	2	4	136	5th
1987	PPG Indy Car World Series	Newman/Haas Racing	15	2	7	2	3	100	6th
1988	PPG Indy Car World Series	Newman/Haas Racing	15	2	0	2	7	126	5th
1988	24 Hours of Le Mans	Porsche AG	1	0	0	0	0	N/A	6th
1989	PPG Indy Car World Series	Newman/Haas Racing	15	0	0	0	4	110	6th
1989	IMSA GT Championship	Busby Racing	1	0	0	0	0	N/A	NC
1990	PPG Indy Car World Series	Newman/Haas Racing	16	0	0	0	4	136	7th
1991	PPG Indy Car World Series	Newman/Haas Racing	17	0	0	0	4	132	7th
1991	IMSA GT Championship	Jochen Dauer Racing	1	0	0	0	0	18	29th
1992	PPG Indy Car World Series	Newman/Haas Racing	15	0	1	0	1	105	6th
1993	PPG Indy Car World Series	Newman/Haas Racing	16	1	1	1	3	117	6th
1994	PPG Indy Car World Series	Newman/Haas Racing	16	0	0	0	1	45	14th
1995	24 Hours of Le Mans	Courage Compétition	1	0	0	0	1	N/A	**2nd**
1996	24 Hours of Le Mans	Courage Compétition	1	0	0	0	0	N/A	13th
1997	24 Hours of Le Mans	Courage Compétition	1	0	0	0	0	N/A	DNF
2000	24 Hours of Le Mans	Panoz Motorsports	1	0	0	0	0	N/A	15th

=== American open-wheel racing ===
(key) (Races in bold indicate pole position)

==== USAC Championship Car ====
USAC Championship Car results
Year	Team	Chassis	Engine	1	2	3	4	5	6	7	8	9	10	11	12	13	14	15	16	17	18	19	20	21	22	23	24	25	26	27	28	Pos.	Pts
1964	Doug Stearly	Elder 61 FE	Offenhauser	PHX	TRE; 11	INDY	MIL																									11th	530
1964	Lee S Glessner	Meskowski 58 D	Offenhauser					LAN; 9																								11th	530
1964	Dean Van Lines Racing Division	Blum 64 FE	Offenhauser						TRE; 11		MIL; 3			TRE; 22		PHX; 18																11th	530
1964	Dean Van Lines Racing Division	Kuzma 60 D	Offenhauser							ISF; 6		DSF; 15	INF; 10		SAC; 8																	11th	530
1965	Dean Van Lines Racing Division	Blum 64 FE	Offenhauser	PHX; 6	TRE; 2							ATL; 2	LAN; 4																			1st	3110
1965	Dean Van Lines Racing Division	Hawk I	Ford 255 ci V8			INDY; 3	MIL; 4	**LAN**; 2	PPR	TRE; Wth	**IRP**; 1			MIL; 2		MIL; 16			TRE; 13		**PHX**; 2											1st	3110
1965	Dean Van Lines Racing Division	Kuzma 60 D	Offenhauser												ISF; 3		DSF; 15	INF; 2		SAC; 3												1st	3110
1966	Dean Van Lines Racing Division	Hawk I	Ford 255 ci V8	**PHX**; 15	**TRE**; 4	**INDY**; 18	**MIL**; 1	**LAN**; 1	**ATL**; 1	PPR	IRP; 1			**MIL**; 1			**TRE**; 1		**PHX**; 1													1st	3070
1966	Jim Robbins	Vollstedt 65	Ford 255 ci V8									LAN; 21																				1st	3070
1966	Dean Van Lines Racing Division	Kuzma 60 D	Offenhauser										ISF; 2		DSF; 15	INF; 1		SAC; 10														1st	3070
1967	Dean Van Lines Racing Division	Hawk I	Ford 255 ci V8	PHX; DNS																												2nd	3360
1967	Dean Van Lines Racing Division	Hawk II	Ford 255 ci V8		**TRE**; 1	**INDY**; 30	MIL; Wth	LAN; 3				IRP; 1	LAN; 1	MTR; 1	**MTR**; 1		MIL; 1			**TRE**; 25		HAN; 24	PHX; 1	RSD; 3								2nd	3360
1967	Bobby Unser	Lotus 18/21	Chevrolet V8						PPR; 14																							2nd	3360
1967	Dean Van Lines Racing Division	Hawk II	Chevrolet V8							MOS; 21	MOS; 11																					2nd	3360
1967	Dean Van Lines Racing Division	Kuzma 60 D	Offenhauser													ISF; 2		DSF; 2	INF; 1		SAC; 2											2nd	3360
1968	Andretti Racing Enterprises	Hawk II	Ford 255 ci V8	HAN; 23	LVS; 2	PHX; 15	**TRE**; 2						PPR; 4										MIL; 2									2nd	4319
1968	Andretti Racing Enterprises	Hawk III	Ford 159ci V8 t					INDY; 33																								2nd	4319
1968	Andretti Racing Enterprises	Hawk III	Ford 255 ci V8						MIL; 2	MOS; 2	MOS; 2	LAN; 17		CDR; 15		**IRP**; 2	IRP; 2			**MTR**; 1	**MTR**; 1										RSD; 18	2nd	4319
1968	Andretti Racing Enterprises	Kuzma 60 D	Offenhauser												NAZ; 2							ISF; 18		DSF; 1	**INF**; 2		**SAC**; 4					2nd	4319
1968	Leader Card Racers	Watson 68	Offy 159 ci t															LAN; 23	LAN													2nd	4319
1968	Andretti Racing Enterprises	Hawk II	Offy 159 ci t																							TRE; 1		**MCH**; 2	HAN; 3	**PHX**; 24		2nd	4319
1969	STP Corporation	Hawk III	Ford 159ci V8 t	PHX; 16	**HAN**; 1	INDY; 1	**MIL**; 7					TRE; 1			MIL; 4		DOV; 11					TRE; 1				PHX; 21						1st	5055
1969	STP Corporation	Hawk III	Ford 255 ci V8					**LAN**; 5		CDR; 10			IRP; 9	IRP; 2						BRN; 4	BRN; 3			SIR; 1	**SIR**; 2		RSD; 1					1st	5055
1969	STP Corporation	Kingfish D	Chevrolet V8						PPR; 1																							1st	5055
1969	STP Corporation	Kuzma 60 D	Offenhauser								NAZ; 1					ISF; 1		DSF; 2	INF; 6				SAC; 15									1st	5055
1970	STP Corporation	Hawk III	Ford 159ci V8 t	**PHX**; 13		TRE; 2			LAN; 8		MCH; 21			MIL; 24							PHX; 8											5th	1890
1970	STP Corporation	Hawk III	Ford 255 ci V8		SON; 2																											5th	1890
1970	STP Corporation	McNamara T-500	Ford 159ci V8 t				INDY; 6	**MIL**; 5							ONT; 10				TRE; 21													5th	1890
1970	STP Corporation	McNamara T-500	Ford 255 ci V8							CDR; 1		**IRP**; 18																				5th	1890
1970	STP Corporation	Kingfish 70 D	Ford Weslake Mk.IV										ISF; 24			DSF; 17	INF; 11	SED; 2		**SAC**; 14												5th	1890
1971	STP Corporation	McNamara T-501	Ford 159ci V8 t	RAF	RAF	PHX; 9	TRE; 18	INDY; 30	MIL; 11	POC; 4	MCH; 12	MIL; 19	ONT; 33	TRE; 2	PHX; 4																	9th	1370
1972	Vel's Parnelli Jones Racing	Colt 70/72	Offy 159 ci t	PHX; 2																												11th	1135
1972	Vel's Parnelli Jones Racing	Parnelli VPJ1	Offy 159 ci t		TRE; 22	INDY; 8	MIL; 8	MCH; 12	POC; 7	**MIL**; 11	ONT; 27	TRE; 28	PHX; 3																			11th	1135
1973	Vel's Parnelli Jones Racing	Parnelli VPJ2	Offy 159 ci t	TWS; 25	TRE; 4	TRE; 1	INDY; 30	MIL; 8	POC; 7	MCH; 5	MIL; 19	ONT	ONT; 12	ONT; 2	MCH; 5	MCH; 2	TRE; 7	**TWS**; 17	PHX; 7													5th	2400
1974	Vel's Parnelli Jones Racing	Parnelli VPJ2	Offy 159 ci t	ONT	ONT; 9	ONT; 25																										15th	655
1974	Vel's Parnelli Jones Racing	Eagle 74	Offy 159 ci t				PHX; 5		INDY; 31		POC; 17	MCH; 18	MIL; 8	MCH; 10	TRE	TRE	PHX; 3															15th	655
1974	Vel's Parnelli Jones Racing	Parnelli VPJ3	Offy 159 ci t					**TRE**; 9		MIL; 17																						15th	655
1975	Vel's Parnelli Jones Racing	Eagle 74	Offy 159 ci t	ONT	ONT	ONT; 28	PHX	TRE	INDY; 28	MIL	POC; 25	MCH	MIL	MCH	TRE																	23rd	210
1975	Sugaripe Prune Racing Team	Eagle 74	Offy 159 ci t													PHX; 3																23rd	210
1976	Penske Racing	McLaren M16C	Offy 159 ci t	PHX	TRE	INDY; 8	MIL	POC; 5	MCH	TWS	TRE	MIL	ONT	MCH	TWS; 4	PHX; 3																9th	1200
1977	Penske Racing	McLaren M24	Cosworth DFX V8 t	ONT	PHX; DNS	TWS	TRE; 16	INDY; 26	MIL	POC; 2	MOS	MCH	TWS	MIL	ONT; 4		PHX; 4															7th	1580
1977	Penske Racing	Penske PC-5	Cosworth DFX V8 t													MCH; 20																7th	1580
1978	Penske Racing	Penske PC-6	Cosworth DFX V8 t	PHX	ONT; 15	TWS; 5	TRE; 13	INDY; 12	MOS	MIL	POC; 23	MCH	ATL	TWS	MIL	ONT	MCH; 20	TRE; 1	SIL	BRH	PHX; 7											17th	681
1980	Penske Racing	Penske PC-9	Cosworth DFX V8 t	ONT	INDY; 20	MIL	POC; 17	MOH																								37th	40
1981-82	Patrick Racing	Wildcat MK8	Cosworth DFX V8 t	INDY; 2	POC	ISF	DSF	INF																								6th	805
1981-82	Patrick Racing	Wildcat MK8B	Cosworth DFX V8 t						INDY; 31																							6th	805
1982-83	Newman/Haas Racing	Lola T700	Cosworth DFX V8 t	ISF	DSF	NAZ	INDY; 23																									32nd	15
1983-84	Newman/Haas Racing	Lola T800	Cosworth DFX V8 t	DSF	INDY; 17																											20th	20

==== PPG Indy Car World Series ====
PPG Indy Car World Series results
Year	Team	No.	Chassis	Engine	1	2	3	4	5	6	7	8	9	10	11	12	13	14	15	16	17	Pos.	Pts	Ref
1979	Penske Racing	99	Penske PC-7	Cosworth DFX V8 t	PHX	ATL	ATL	INDY	TRE	TRE	MCH	MCH	WGL	TRE	ONT; 3	MCH; DNS	ATL	PHX				11th	700	
1980	Penske Racing	12	Penske PC-9	Cosworth DFX V8 t	ONT	INDY; 20	MIL	POC; 17	MOH	MCH	WGL	MIL	ONT	**MCH**; 1	MEX	**PHX**; 2						16th	580	
1981	Patrick Racing	40	Wildcat MK8	Cosworth DFX V8 t	PHX; 11	MIL; 3	ATL; 3	ATL; 2	MCH	RIV	MIL	MCH; 2	**WGL**; 16	MEX	PHX; 4							11th	81	
1982	Patrick Racing	40	Wildcat MK8B	Cosworth DFX V8 t	PHX; 2	ATL; 11	MIL; 9	CLE; 2	MCH; 2	MIL; 3	POC; 14	RIV; 23	ROA; 14	MCH; 2	PHX; 3							3rd	188	
1983	Newman/Haas Racing	3	Lola T700	Cosworth DFX V8 t	ATL; 5	INDY; 23	MIL; 18	**CLE**; 14	MCH; 3	**ROA**; 1	POC; 7	RIV; 16	MOH; 2	MCH; 4	CPL; 1	LAG; 2	PHX; 2					3rd	133	
1984	Newman/Haas Racing	3	Lola T800	Cosworth DFX V8 t	**LBH**; 1	PHX; 20	INDY; 17	MIL; 8	**POR**; 26	**MEA**; 1	**CLE**; 21	**MCH**; 1	**ROA**; 1	POC; 19	**MOH**; 1	SAN; 7	MCH; 1	PHX; 12	**LAG**; 2	CPL; 2		1st	176	
1985	Newman/Haas Racing	1	Lola T900	Cosworth DFX V8 t	**LBH**; 1	INDY; 2	**MIL**; 1	POR; 1	**MEA**; 26	CLE; 14	MCH; 10	ROA	POC; 7	MOH; 7	SAN; 15	MCH; 21	LAG; 11	PHX; 3	MIA; 27			5th	114	
1986	Newman/Haas Racing	5	Lola T86/00	Cosworth DFX V8 t	**PHX**; 7	LBH; 5	INDY; 32	MIL; 5	POR; 1	MEA; 24	CLE; 3	TOR; 3	MCH; 21	POC; 1	**MOH**; 24	SAN; 8	MCH; 10	ROA; 9	**LAG**; 4	PHX; 4	MIA; 11	5th	136	
1987	Newman/Haas Racing	5	Lola T87/00	Chevrolet 265A V8 t	**LBH**; 1	**PHX**; 5	**INDY**; 9	MIL; 17	POR; 10	**MEA**; 2	CLE; 10	TOR; 15	MCH; 19	**POC**; 19	**ROA**; 1	MOH; 17	NAZ; 19	**LAG**; 17	**MIA**; 4			6th	100	
1988	Newman/Haas Racing	6	Lola T88/00	Chevrolet 265A V8 t	PHX; 1	LBH; 15		MIL; 17	POR; 5	CLE; 1	TOR; 25	MEA; 2	MCH; 12	POC; 17	MOH; 2	ROA; 3	NAZ; 3	LAG; 3	MIA; 15			5th	126	
1988	Newman/Haas Racing	6	Lola T87/00	Chevrolet 265A V8 t			INDY; 20															5th	126	
1989	Newman/Haas Racing	5	Lola T89/00	Chevrolet 265A V8 t	PHX; 8	LBH; 18	INDY; 4	MIL; 7	DET; 3	POR; 25	CLE; 2	MEA; 20	TOR; 26	MCH; 3	POC; 5	MOH; 7	ROA; 7	NAZ; 8	LAG; 2			6th	110	
1990	Newman/Haas Racing	6	Lola T90/00	Chevrolet 265A V8 t	PHX; 4	LBH; 5	INDY; 27	MIL; 21	DET; 25	POR; 2	CLE; 4	MEA; 24	TOR; 6	MCH; 3	DEN; 4	VAN; 3	MOH; 2	ROA; 5	NAZ; 4	LAG; 26		7th	136	
1991	Newman/Haas Racing	6	Lola T91/00	Chevrolet 265A V8 t	SRF; 17	LBH; 19	PHX; 9	INDY; 7	MIL; 3	DET; 7	POR; 5	CLE; 6	MEA; 15	TOR; 2	MCH; 4	DEN; 15	VAN; 4	MOH; 7	ROA; 3	NAZ; 5	LAG; 3	7th	132	
1992	Newman/Haas Racing	2	Lola T91/00	Ford XB V8 t	SRF; 7																	6th	105	
1992	Newman/Haas Racing	2	Lola T92/00	Ford XB V8 t		PHX; 17	LBH; 23	INDY; 23	DET	POR; 6	MIL; 6	NHA; 7	TOR; 4	**MCH**; 15	CLE; 5	ROA; 5	VAN; 6	MOH; 5	NAZ; 5	LAG; 2		6th	105	
1993	Newman/Haas Racing	6	Lola T93/00	Ford XB V8 t	SRF; 4	PHX; 1	LBH; 18	INDY; 5	MIL; 18	DET; 3	POR; 6	CLE; 5	TOR; 8	**MCH**; 2	NHA; 20	ROA; 15	VAN; 5	MOH; 7	NAZ; 13	LAG; 9		6th	117	
1994	Newman/Haas Racing	6	Lola T94/00	Ford XB V8 t	SRF; 3	PHX; 21	LBH; 5	INDY; 32	MIL; 14	DET; 18	POR; 9	CLE; 27	TOR; 4	MCH; 18	MOH; 10	NHA; 19	VAN; 11	ROA; 16	NAZ; 25	LAG; 19		14th	45	

===== Indianapolis 500 =====
Year	Chassis	Engine	Start	Finish	Team
1965	Hawk	Ford	4	3	Dean Van Lines Racing Division
1966	Hawk	Ford	**1**	18	Dean Van Lines Racing Division
1967	Hawk	Ford	**1**	30	Dean Van Lines Racing Division
1968	Hawk	Ford	4	33	Andretti Racing Enterprises
1969	Hawk	Ford	2	**1**	STP Corporation
1970	McNamara	Ford	8	6	STP Corporation
1971	McNamara	Ford	9	30	STP Corporation
1972	Parnelli	Offenhauser	5	8	Vel's Parnelli Jones Racing
1973	Parnelli	Offenhauser	6	30	Vel's Parnelli Jones Racing
1974	Eagle	Offenhauser	5	31	Vel's Parnelli Jones Racing
1975	Eagle	Offenhauser	27	28	Vel's Parnelli Jones Racing
1976	McLaren	Offenhauser	19	8	Penske Racing
1977	McLaren	Cosworth	6	26	Penske Racing
1978	Penske	Cosworth	33	12	Penske Racing
1980	Penske	Cosworth	2	20	Penske Racing
1981	Wildcat	Cosworth	32	2	Patrick Racing
1982	Wildcat	Cosworth	4	31	Patrick Racing
1983	Lola	Cosworth	11	23	Newman/Haas Racing
1984	Lola	Cosworth	6	17	Newman/Haas Racing
1985	Lola	Cosworth	4	2	Newman/Haas Racing
1986	Lola	Cosworth	30	32	Newman/Haas Racing
1987	Lola	Chevrolet	**1**	9	Newman/Haas Racing
1988	Lola	Chevrolet	4	20	Newman/Haas Racing
1989	Lola	Chevrolet	5	4	Newman/Haas Racing
1990	Lola	Chevrolet	6	27	Newman/Haas Racing
1991	Lola	Chevrolet	3	7	Newman/Haas Racing
1992	Lola	Ford-Cosworth	3	23	Newman/Haas Racing
1993	Lola	Ford-Cosworth	2	5	Newman/Haas Racing
1994	Lola	Ford-Cosworth	9	32	Newman/Haas Racing

=== NASCAR ===
(key) (Bold – Pole position awarded by qualifying time. Italics – Pole position earned by points standings or practice time. * – Most laps led.)

==== Grand National Series ====
NASCAR Grand National Series results
Year	Team	No.	Make	1	2	3	4	5	6	7	8	9	10	11	12	13	14	15	16	17	18	19	20	21	22	23	24	25	26	27	28	29	30	31	32	33	34	35	36	37	38	39	40	41	42	43	44	45	46	47	48	49	50	51	52	53	54	NGNC	Pts	Ref
1966	Bondy Long	71	Chevy	AUG	RSD; 16	DAY																																																				NA	0	
1966	Smokey Yunick	13	Chevy				DAY; 20	DAY; 37	CAR	BRI	ATL	HCY	CLB	GPS	BGS	NWS	MAR	DAR	LGY	MGR	MON	RCH	CLT	DTS	ASH	PIF	SMR	AWS	BLV	GPS																												NA	0	
1966	Owens Racing	5	Dodge																												DAY; 31	ODS	BRR	OXF	FON	ISP	BRI	SMR	NSV	ATL	CLB	AWS	BLV	BGS	DAR	HCY	RCH	HBO	MAR	NWS	CLT	CAR						NA	0	
1967	Holman Moody	114	Ford	AUG	RSD; 9	DAY																																																				NA	0	
1967	Holman Moody	11	Ford				DAY; 6	DAY; 1*	AWS	BRI	GPS	BGS	ATL; 19	CLB	HCY	NWS	MAR	SVH	RCH	DAR	BLV	LGY	CLT	ASH	MGR	SMR	BIR	CAR	GPS	MGY	DAY; 27	TRN	OXF	FDA	ISP	BRI	SMR	NSV	ATL	BGS	CLB	SVH	DAR	HCY	RCH	BLV	HBO	MAR	NWS	CLT; 27	CAR	AWS						NA	0	
1968	Holman Moody	11	Ford	MGR	MGY	RSD; 27																						DAY; 12	ISP	OXF	FDA	TRN	BRI	SMR	NSV	ATL	CLB	BGS	AWS	SBO	LGY	DAR	HCY	RCH	BLV	HBO	MAR	NWS	AUG	CLT	CAR	JFC						NA	0	
1968	Holman Moody	11	Mercury				DAY; 29	BRI	RCH	ATL	HCY	GPS	CLB	NWS	MAR	AUG	AWS	DAR	BLV	LGY	CLT	ASH	MGR	SMR	BIR	CAR	GPS																															NA	0	
1969	Holman Moody	97	Ford	MGR	MGY	RSD; 18	DAY	DAY	DAY	CAR	AUG	BRI	ATL	CLB	HCY	GPS	RCH	NWS	MAR	AWS	DAR	BLV	LGY	CLT	MGR	SMR	MCH	KPT	GPS	NCF	DAY	DOV	TPN	TRN	BLV	BRI	NSV	SMR	ATL	MCH	SBO	BGS	AWS	DAR	HCY	RCH	TAL	CLB	MAR	NWS	CLT	SVH	AUG	CAR	JFC	MGR	TWS	NA	0	

===== Daytona 500 =====
Year	Team	Manufacturer	Start	Finish
1966	Smokey Yunick	Chevrolet	39	37
1967	Holman Moody	Ford	12	**1***
1968	Holman Moody	Mercury	20	29

=== 24 Hours of Le Mans results ===
Year	Team	Co-Drivers	Car	Class	Laps	Pos.	Class Pos.
1966	(United States) Holman & Moody	(Belgium) Lucien Bianchi	Ford GT40 Mk.II	P +5.0	97	DNF	DNF
1967	(United States) Holman & Moody	(Belgium) Lucien Bianchi	Ford GT40 Mk.IV	P +5.0	188	DNF	DNF
1982	(United States) Grand Touring Cars Inc.	(United States) Michael Andretti	Mirage M12-Ford Cosworth	C	-	DNS	DNS
1983	(Germany) Porsche Kremer Racing	(United States) Michael Andretti (France) Philippe Alliot	Porsche 956	C	364	**3rd**	**3rd**
1988	(Germany) Porsche AG	(United States) Michael Andretti (United States) John Andretti	Porsche 962C	C1	375	6th	6th
1995	(France) Courage Compétition	(France) Bob Wollek (France) Éric Hélary	Courage C34-Porsche	WSC	297	**2nd**	**1st**
1996	(France) Courage Compétition	(Netherlands) Jan Lammers (United Kingdom) Derek Warwick	Courage C36-Porsche	LMP1	315	13th	**3rd**
1997	(France) Courage Compétition	(United States) Michael Andretti (France) Olivier Grouillard	Courage C36-Porsche	LMP	197	DNF	DNF
2000	(United States) Panoz Motorsports	(Australia) David Brabham (Denmark) Jan Magnussen	Panoz LMP-1 Roadster-S-Élan	LMP900	315	15th	8th

=== Complete Formula One World Championship results ===
(key) (Races in bold indicate pole position; races in italics indicate fastest lap)

Year	Entrant	Chassis	Engine	1	2	3	4	5	6	7	8	9	10	11	12	13	14	15	16	17	WDC	Pts
1968	Gold Leaf Team Lotus	Lotus 49B	Ford Cosworth DFV 3.0 V8	RSA	ESP	MON	BEL	NED	FRA	GBR	GER	ITA; DNS	CAN	**USA**; Ret	MEX						NC	0
1969	Gold Leaf Team Lotus	Lotus 49B	Ford Cosworth DFV 3.0 V8	RSA; Ret	ESP	MON	NED	FRA	GBR												NC	0
1969	Gold Leaf Team Lotus	Lotus 63	Ford Cosworth DFV 3.0 V8							GER; Ret	ITA	CAN	USA; Ret	MEX							NC	0
1970	STP Corporation	March 701	Ford Cosworth DFV 3.0 V8	RSA; Ret	ESP; 3	MON	BEL	NED	FRA	GBR; Ret	GER; Ret	AUT; Ret	ITA	CAN	USA	MEX					16th	4
1971	SEFAC Ferrari	Ferrari 312B	Ferrari 001 3.0 F12	RSA; 1	ESP; Ret	MON; DNQ	NED; Ret	FRA	GBR												8th	12
1971	SEFAC Ferrari	Ferrari 312B2	Ferrari 001/1 3.0 F12							GER; 4	AUT	ITA	CAN; 13	USA; DNS							8th	12
1972	SEFAC Ferrari	Ferrari 312B2	Ferrari 001/1 3.0 F12	ARG; Ret	RSA; 4	ESP; Ret	MON	BEL	FRA	GBR	GER	AUT	ITA; 7	CAN	USA; 6						12th	4
1974	Vel's Parnelli Jones Racing	Parnelli VPJ4	Ford Cosworth DFV 3.0 V8	ARG	BRA	RSA	ESP	BEL	MON	SWE	NED	FRA	GBR	GER	AUT	ITA	CAN; 7	USA; DSQ			NC	0
1975	Vel's Parnelli Jones Racing	Parnelli VPJ4	Ford Cosworth DFV 3.0 V8	ARG; Ret	BRA; 7	RSA; 17	ESP; Ret	MON; Ret	BEL	SWE; 4	NED	FRA; 5	GBR; 12	GER; 10	AUT; Ret	ITA; Ret	USA; Ret				14th	5
1976	John Player Team Lotus	Lotus 77	Ford Cosworth DFV 3.0 V8	BRA; Ret			ESP; Ret	BEL; Ret	MON	SWE; Ret	FRA; 5	GBR; Ret	GER; 12	AUT; 5	NED; 3	ITA; Ret	CAN; 3	USA; Ret	**JPN**; 1		6th	22
1976	Vel's Parnelli Jones Racing	Parnelli VPJ4B	Ford Cosworth DFV 3.0 V8		RSA; 6	USW; Ret															6th	22
1977	John Player Team Lotus	Lotus 78	Ford Cosworth DFV 3.0 V8	ARG; 5	BRA; Ret	RSA; Ret	USW; 1	**ESP**; 1	MON; 5	**BEL**; Ret	**SWE**; 6	**FRA**; 1	GBR; 14	GER; Ret	AUT; Ret	**NED**; Ret	ITA; 1	USA; 2	**CAN**; 9	**JPN**; Ret	**3rd**	**47**
1978	John Player Team Lotus	Lotus 78	Ford Cosworth DFV 3.0 V8	**ARG**; 1	BRA; 4	RSA; 7	USW; 2	MON; 11													**1st**	**64**
1978	John Player Team Lotus	Lotus 79	Ford Cosworth DFV 3.0 V8						**BEL**; 1	**ESP**; 1	**SWE**; Ret	FRA; 1	GBR; Ret	**GER**; 1	AUT; Ret	**NED**; 1	**ITA**; 6	**USA**; Ret	CAN; 10		**1st**	**64**
1979	Martini Racing Team Lotus	Lotus 79	Ford Cosworth DFV 3.0 V8	ARG; 5	BRA; Ret	RSA; 4	USW; 4		BEL; Ret			GBR; Ret	GER; Ret	AUT; Ret	NED; Ret	ITA; 5	CAN; 10	USA; Ret			12th	14
1979	Martini Racing Team Lotus	Lotus 80	Ford Cosworth DFV 3.0 V8					ESP; 3		MON; Ret	FRA; Ret										12th	14
1980	Team Essex Lotus	Lotus 81	Ford Cosworth DFV 3.0 V8	ARG; Ret	BRA; Ret	RSA; 12	USW; Ret	BEL; Ret	MON; 7	FRA; Ret	GBR; Ret	GER; 7	AUT; Ret	NED; 8	ITA; Ret	CAN; Ret	USA; 6				20th	1
1981	Marlboro Team Alfa Romeo	Alfa Romeo 179C	Alfa Romeo 1260 3.0 V12	USW; 4	BRA; Ret	ARG; 8	SMR; Ret	BEL; 10	MON; Ret	ESP; 8											17th	3
1981	Marlboro Team Alfa Romeo	Alfa Romeo 179B	Alfa Romeo 1260 3.0 V12								FRA; 8	GBR; Ret	GER; 9	AUT; Ret							17th	3
1981	Marlboro Team Alfa Romeo	Alfa Romeo 179D	Alfa Romeo 1260 3.0 V12												NED; Ret	ITA; Ret	CAN; 7	CPL; Ret			17th	3
1982	TAG Williams Team	Williams FW07C	Ford Cosworth DFV 3.0 V8	RSA	BRA	USW; Ret	SMR	BEL	MON	DET	CAN	NED	GBR	FRA	GER	AUT	SUI				19th	4
1982	Ferrari	Ferrari 126C2	Ferrari 021 1.5 V6 t															**ITA**; 3	CPL; Ret		19th	4

=== Complete Formula One non-championship results ===
(key) (Races in bold indicate pole position; races in italics indicate fastest lap)

Year	Entrant	Chassis	Engine	1	2	3	4	5	6	7	8
1971	Scuderia Ferrari SpA SEFAC	Ferrari 312B	Ferrari 001 3.0 F12	ARG	ROC	QUE; 1	SPR	INT	RIN	OUL	VIC
1975	Vel's Parnelli Jones Racing	Parnelli VPJ4	Ford Cosworth DFV 3.0 V8	ROC	INT; 3	SUI					
1976	Walter Wolf Racing	Wolf–Williams FW05	Ford Cosworth DFV 3.0 V8	ROC	INT; 7						
1977	John Player Team Lotus	Lotus 78	Ford Cosworth DFV 3.0 V8	ROC; Ret							
1978	John Player Team Lotus	Lotus 79	Ford Cosworth DFV 3.0 V8	INT; Ret							
1979	Martini Racing Team Lotus	Lotus 79	Ford Cosworth DFV 3.0 V8	**ROC**; 3	GNM; 3	DIN					
1980	Team Essex Lotus	Lotus 81	Ford Cosworth DFV 3.0 V8	ESP; Ret							

== See also ==
- List of celebrities who own wineries and vineyards

== Notes and references ==
=== References ===
Sporting positions
Preceded by Johnny White	Indianapolis 500; Rookie of the Year; 1965	Succeeded by Jackie Stewart
Preceded by A. J. Foyt	USAC Championship; Champion; 1965-1966	Succeeded by A. J. Foyt
Preceded by Richard Petty	Daytona 500; Winner; 1967	Succeeded by Cale Yarborough
Preceded by Bobby Unser	Indianapolis 500; Winner; 1969	Succeeded by Al Unser
Preceded by Bobby Unser	USAC Championship; Champion; 1969	Succeeded by Al Unser
Preceded by Niki Lauda	Formula One World Champion; 1978	Succeeded by Jody Scheckter
Preceded by Al Unser	International Race of Champions; Champion; IROC VI (1979)	Succeeded by Bobby Allison
Preceded by Al Unser	CART Series; Champion; 1984	Succeeded by Al Unser
