= McNamara (constructor) =

McNamara was a German constructor of racecar chassis from the late 1960s to the 1972.

== History ==
McNamara was formed by Francis McNamara, a United States soldier who raced Formula Vee cars while stationed in Germany. Dan Hawkes designed a 1969 chassis for Formula 3 called the F3 McNamara Sebring Mk3. The car was modified for 1970, and it was called the 3B. McNamara was one of the first manufacturers to experiment with riveted and glued aluminum monocoque race car chassis.

The team also built chassis for Mario Andretti in 1970 for the Indianapolis 500, as well as modifying Andretti's March 701 in Formula One. Neither car proved successful.

McNamara's wife suddenly died, he was investigated by the Interpol, and he disappeared.
