= Driver of the Year =

Award presented to drivers competing in motorsport on four wheels

The Driver of the Year Award was an award founded in 1967 by Martini & Rossi. The award was presented to drivers competing in motorsport on four wheels. Today it is privately owned and the voting panel consists of automotive and racing journalists. Mario Andretti won the first award in 1967. Jimmie Johnson has won the award 5 different times, the most in its history. Kevin Harvick won the award most recently in 2014. since then, no award has been given.

== Winners ==
1967: Mario Andretti
1968: Mark Donohue
1969: Lee Roy Yarbrough
1970: Al Unser Sr.
1971: Richard Petty
1972: Bobby Allison
1973: David Pearson
1974: Bobby Unser
1975: A. J. Foyt
1976: David Pearson
1977: Cale Yarborough
1978: Mario Andretti
1979: Darrell Waltrip
1980: Johnny Rutherford
1981: Darrell Waltrip
1982: Darrell Waltrip
1983: Bobby Rahal
1984: Mario Andretti
1985: Bill Elliott
1986: Bobby Rahal
1987: Dale Earnhardt
1988: Bill Elliott
1989: Emerson Fittipaldi
1990: Al Unser Jr.
1991: Michael Andretti
1992: Bobby Rahal
1993: Nigel Mansell
1994: Dale Earnhardt
1995: Jeff Gordon
1996: John Force
1997: Jeff Gordon
1998: Jeff Gordon
1999: Dale Jarrett
2000: Bobby Labonte
2001: Jeff Gordon
2002: Cristiano da Matta
2003: Ryan Newman
2004: Greg Anderson
2005: Tony Stewart
2006: Jimmie Johnson
2007: Jimmie Johnson
2008: Tony Schumacher
2009: Jimmie Johnson
2010: Jimmie Johnson
2011: Tony Stewart
2012: Brad Keselowski
2013: Jimmie Johnson
2014: Kevin Harvick
