= IROC VIII =

Motor car races held in 1984

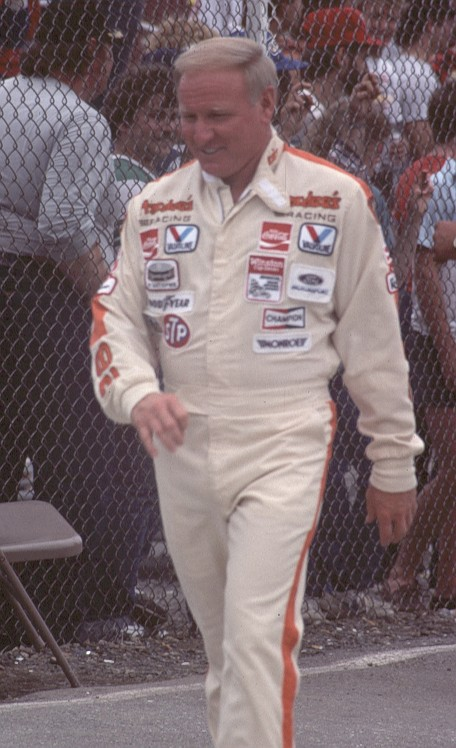
Cale Yarborough, the IROC VIII champion

IROC VIII was the eighth year of IROC competition, which took place in 1984. It saw the use of the Chevrolet Camaro in all races, and was the first incarnation of the IROC format in which twelve drivers from different series compete in all four races. Races one and four took place at Michigan International Speedway, while race two took place at Burke Lakefront Airport, and race three ran on the Talladega Superspeedway. Cale Yarborough won one race en route to the championship and $150,000.

This season was the first of three straight that television coverage was on CBS.

The roster of drivers and final points standings were as follows:

Rank	Driver	Points	Winnings	Series and reasons why invited
1	(United States) Cale Yarborough	58	$150,000	NASCAR Winston Cup Series; 1983 Daytona 500 winner 3 Time Winston Cup Champion
2	(United States) Neil Bonnett	55	$75,000	NASCAR Winston Cup Series; 6th in 1983 Winston Cup Points; 1981 Southern 500 winner 2 Time World 600 Winner
3	(United States) Darrell Waltrip	52	$35,000	NASCAR Winston Cup Series; 2nd in 1983 Winston Cup Points
4	(United States) Benny Parsons	47	$30,000	NASCAR Winston Cup Series; Former IROC Race Winner
5	(United States) Gordon Johncock	45	$25,000	CART PPG Indy Car World Series; Former IROC Race Winner
6	(United Kingdom) Derek Bell	35	$24,000	World Endurance Championship; 2nd in 1983 World Endurance points
7	(United States) Danny Ongais	33	$23,000	CART PPG Indy Car World Series
8	(United States) Johnny Rutherford	33	$22,000	CART PPG Indy Car World Series; 3 Time Indianapolis 500 winner 1980 IndyCar Champion
9	(United States) Dale Earnhardt	31	$21,000	NASCAR Winston Cup Series; 8th in 1983 Winston Cup Points
10	(United States) Tom Sneva	29	$20,000	CART PPG Indy Car World Series; 4th in 1983 IndyCar points
11	(Brazil) Emerson Fittipaldi	28	$20,000	CART PPG Indy Car World Series; 2 Time FIA Formula One World Champion
12	(Belgium) Jacky Ickx	17	$20,000	World Endurance Championship; 1983 World Endurance Group C Champion

== Race results ==
=== Race One, Michigan International Speedway ===
Saturday, June 16, 1984

Finish	Grid	Car no.	Driver	Car Make	Car Color	Laps	Status	Laps Led	Points
1	9	3	(United States) Neil Bonnett	Chevrolet Camaro	Pink	50	0:41:06	10	23 (5)
2	12	7	(United States) Benny Parsons	Chevrolet Camaro	Blue	50	Flagged		17
3	6	12	(United States) Gordon Johncock	Chevrolet Camaro	Dark Red	50	Flagged	14	16 (3)
4	5	4	(United States) Darrell Waltrip	Chevrolet Camaro	Cream	50	Flagged		12
5	4	11	(United States) Danny Ongais	Chevrolet Camaro	Black	50	Flagged	22	15 (2)
6	10	5	(United States) Johnny Rutherford	Chevrolet Camaro	Powder Blue	50	Flagged		9
7	2	2	(United States) Dale Earnhardt	Chevrolet Camaro	Dark Blue	50	Flagged	4	8
8	1	10	(Brazil) Emerson Fittipaldi	Chevrolet Camaro	Red	50	Flagged		7
9	3	15	(Belgium) Jacky Ickx	Chevrolet Camaro	White	50	Flagged		6
10	11	9	(United Kingdom) Derek Bell	Chevrolet Camaro	Mustard	49	Flagged		5
11	7	8	(United States) Tom Sneva	Chevrolet Camaro	Orange	49	Flagged		4
12	8	6	(United States) Cale Yarborough	Chevrolet Camaro	Yellow	49	Flagged		3

(5) Indicates 5 bonus points added to normal race points scored for leading the most laps.
(3) Indicates 3 bonus points added to normal race points scored for leading the 2nd most laps
(2) Indicates 2 bonus points added to normal race points scored for leading the 3rd most laps.

Average speed: 145.985 mph (234.940 km/h)
Cautions: n/a
Margin of victory: 3 cl
Lead changes: 9

=== Race Two, Burke Lakefront Airport ===
Saturday, July 7, 1984

Finish	Grid	Car no.	Driver	Car Make	Car Color	Laps	Status	Laps Led	Points
1	1	15	(United States) Cale Yarborough	Chevrolet Camaro	White	30	0:45:05	6	24 (3)
2	3	4	(United Kingdom) Derek Bell	Chevrolet Camaro	Cream	30	Flagged		17
3	10	10	(United States) Gordon Johncock	Chevrolet Camaro	Red	30	Flagged		14
4	11	8	(United States) Benny Parsons	Chevrolet Camaro	Orange	30	Flagged		12
5	9	6	(United States) Darrell Waltrip	Chevrolet Camaro	Yellow	30	Flagged		10
6	12	2	(United States) Neil Bonnett	Chevrolet Camaro	Dark Blue	30	Flagged		9
7	8	9	(United States) Danny Ongais	Chevrolet Camaro	Mustard	30	Flagged		8
8	5	7	(Brazil) Emerson Fittipaldi	Chevrolet Camaro	Blue	30	Flagged		7
9	7	5	(United States) Johnny Rutherford	Chevrolet Camaro	Powder Blue	30	Flagged		6
10	6	11	(United States) Dale Earnhardt	Chevrolet Camaro	Black	30	Flagged		5
11	2	3	(United States) Tom Sneva	Chevrolet Camaro	Pink	30	Flagged	24	9 (5)
12	4	12	(Belgium) Jacky Ickx	Chevrolet Camaro	Dark Red	30	Flagged		3

(5) Indicates 5 bonus points added to normal race points scored for leading the most laps.
(3) Indicates 3 bonus points added to normal race points scored for leading the 2nd most laps
(2) Indicates 2 bonus points added to normal race points scored for leading the 3rd most laps (did not occur in this race so not awarded).

Average speed: 99.053 mph (159.410 km/h)
Cautions: n/a
Margin of victory: 8 sec
Lead changes: 2

=== Race Three, Talladega Superspeedway ===
Saturday, July 28, 1984

Finish	Grid	Car no.	Driver	Car Make	Car Color	Laps	Status	Laps Led	Points
1	7	5	(United States) Darrell Waltrip	Chevrolet Camaro	Light Blue	38	0:33:53	3	24 (3)
2	9	2	(United States) Cale Yarborough	Chevrolet Camaro	Dark Blue	38	Flagged		17
3	3	12	(United States) Dale Earnhardt	Chevrolet Camaro	Red	38	Flagged		14
4	5	3	(United States) Johnny Rutherford	Chevrolet Camaro	Purple	38	Flagged	1	14 (2)
5	11	11	(United States) Benny Parsons	Chevrolet Camaro	Black	38	Flagged	33	15 (5)
6	4	7	(Brazil) Emerson Fittipaldi	Chevrolet Camaro	Medium Blue	38	Flagged		9
7	10	4	(United States) Gordon Johncock	Chevrolet Camaro	Light Mustard	38	Flagged		8
8	1	8	(United States) Tom Sneva	Chevrolet Camaro	Orange	38	Flagged	1	9 (2)
9	8	15	(United Kingdom) Derek Bell	Chevrolet Camaro	White	38	Flagged		6
10	2	10	(Belgium) Jacky Ickx	Chevrolet Camaro	Red	38	Flagged		5
11	12	6	(United States) Neil Bonnett	Chevrolet Camaro	Yellow	37	Flagged		4
12	6	9	(United States) Danny Ongais	Chevrolet Camaro	Dark Mustard	36	Flagged		3

(5) Indicates 5 bonus points added to normal race points scored for leading the most laps.
(3) Indicates 3 bonus points added to normal race points scored for leading the 2nd most laps
(2) Indicates 2 bonus points added to normal race points scored for leading the 3rd most laps.

Average speed: 179.02 mph (288.10 km/h)
Cautions: 1 (Lap 1, Neil Bonnett & Derek Bell accident)
Margin of victory: 8 inches
Lead changes: 4

=== Race Four, Michigan International Speedway ===
Saturday, August 11, 1984

Finish	Grid	Car no.	Driver	Car Make	Car Color	Laps	Status	Laps Led	Points
1	5	4	(United States) Neil Bonnett	Chevrolet Camaro	Cream	50	0:40:26	1	24 (3)
2	2	5	(United States) Cale Yarborough	Chevrolet Camaro	Powder Blue	50	Flagged	49	22 (5)
3	11	9	(United States) Tom Sneva	Chevrolet Camaro	Mustard	50	Flagged		14
4	10	3	(United States) Danny Ongais	Chevrolet Camaro	Pink	50	Flagged		12
5	4	7	(United States) Gordon Johncock	Chevrolet Camaro	Blue	50	Flagged		10
6	1	10	(United States) Darrell Waltrip	Chevrolet Camaro	Red	50	Flagged		9
7	3	12	(United States) Benny Parsons	Chevrolet Camaro	Dark Red	50	Flagged		8
8	6	15	(United Kingdom) Derek Bell	Chevrolet Camaro	White	50	Flagged		7
9	8	8	(United States) Johnny Rutherford	Chevrolet Camaro	Orange	50	Flagged		6
10	9	2	(Brazil) Emerson Fittipaldi	Chevrolet Camaro	Dark Blue	49	Flagged		5
11	7	6	(United States) Dale Earnhardt	Chevrolet Camaro	Yellow	46	Flagged		4
12	12	11	(Belgium) Jacky Ickx	Chevrolet Camaro	Black	41	Flagged		3

(5) Indicates 5 bonus points added to normal race points scored for leading the most laps.
(3) Indicates 3 bonus points added to normal race points scored for leading the 2nd most laps
(2) Indicates 2 bonus points added to normal race points scored for leading the 3rd most laps (did not occur in this race so not awarded).

Average speed: 148.392 mph (238.814 km/h)
Cautions: n/a
Margin of victory: 3 feet
Lead changes: 2
