= Johnny Rutherford =

American racing driver (born 1938)

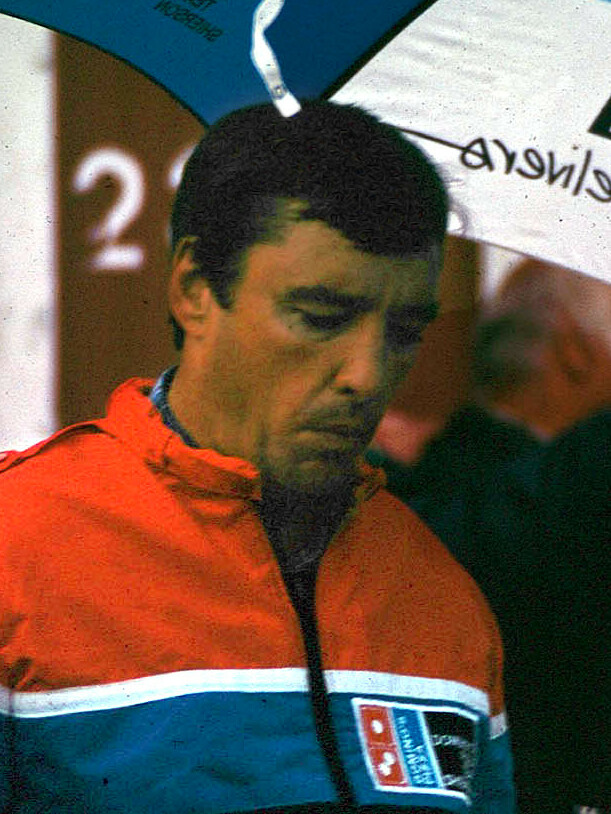
- Rutherford at the 1984 Pocono 500
- Born: John Sherman Rutherford III; March 12, 1938 (age 88) Coffeyville, Kansas, U.S.

Championship titles
- USAC Sprint Car (1965); CART Championship Car (1980); Major victories Indianapolis 500 (1974, 1976, 1980); Pocono 500 (1974); Michigan 500 (1986)

Champ Car career
- 314 races run over 30 years
- Best finish: 1st (1980)
- First race: 1962 Hoosier Hundred (ISF)
- Last race: 1989 Pocono 500 (Pocono)
- First win: 1965 Atlanta Championship 250 (Atlanta)
- Last win: 1986 Michigan 500 (Michigan)
Wins	Podiums	Poles
27	60	23

NASCAR Cup Series career
- 35 races run over 12 years
- Best finish: 33rd (1981)
- First race: 1963 Daytona Qualifier #2 (Daytona)
- Last race: 1988 Checker 500 (Phoenix)
- First win: 1963 Daytona Qualifier #2 (Daytona)
Wins	Top tens	Poles
1	5	0

John Sherman Rutherford III (born March 12, 1938), also known as "Lone Star JR", is an American former automobile racing driver. During an Indy Car career that spanned more than three decades, he scored 27 wins and 23 pole positions in 314 starts. He became one of six drivers to win the Indianapolis 500 at least three times, winning in 1974, 1976, and 1980. He also won the CART championship in 1980.

Rutherford began racing modified stock cars in 1959 and he also dabbled in stock car racing, making 35 NASCAR Cup Series starts from 1963 to 1988. Rutherford won in his first start, at Daytona International Speedway driving for Smokey Yunick. This made him one of the youngest drivers ever to win a NASCAR points-paying race, as well as only the sixth racer in history to win in their NASCAR debut race, a distinction not again achieved until SuperCars racer Shane van Gisbergen won in his NASCAR debut in 2023.

== Racing career ==
In 1959, Rutherford started driving modified stock cars in Dallas. He joined the International Motor Contest Association sprint car circuit in 1961 leading it for most of 1962. Rutherford later joined the United States Auto Club (USAC) starting in the Hoosier Hundred and later winning his first championship.

Rutherford won his qualifying heat race for the 1963 Daytona 500, becoming the youngest winner of a Duel as a championship race, a record that would stand as the races were taken off the championship schedule in 1971 (though it has since been broken, the race was not a championship race when it happened). Later that year he also had his first start in the Indianapolis 500. Rutherford's first Indy car race win took place at the Atlanta 250. He won the USAC National Sprint Car Championship in 1965.

Rutherford made his first start in the Indianapolis 500 in 1963. The following year, he was directly behind Eddie Sachs when Sachs plowed into the burning car of Dave MacDonald, killing both drivers. Rutherford miraculously squeezed between the crash and the wall, passing so close to Sachs' car that a lemon that Sachs wore on a string around his neck was found inside Rutherford's engine compartment.

On April 3, 1966, Rutherford suffered a serious crash at Eldora Speedway. His car flipped out of the track, and he suffered broken arms, a broken finger, and a head injury. He was forced to sit out the 1966 Indy 500 and the rest of the season. He struggled without a competitive ride for the next several seasons. He raised his profile by qualifying a surprising second for the 1970 Indianapolis 500--missing the pole by only .01 of a second--and led the field into turn 1. He was back with a top-flight ride when he joined the McLaren team in 1973.

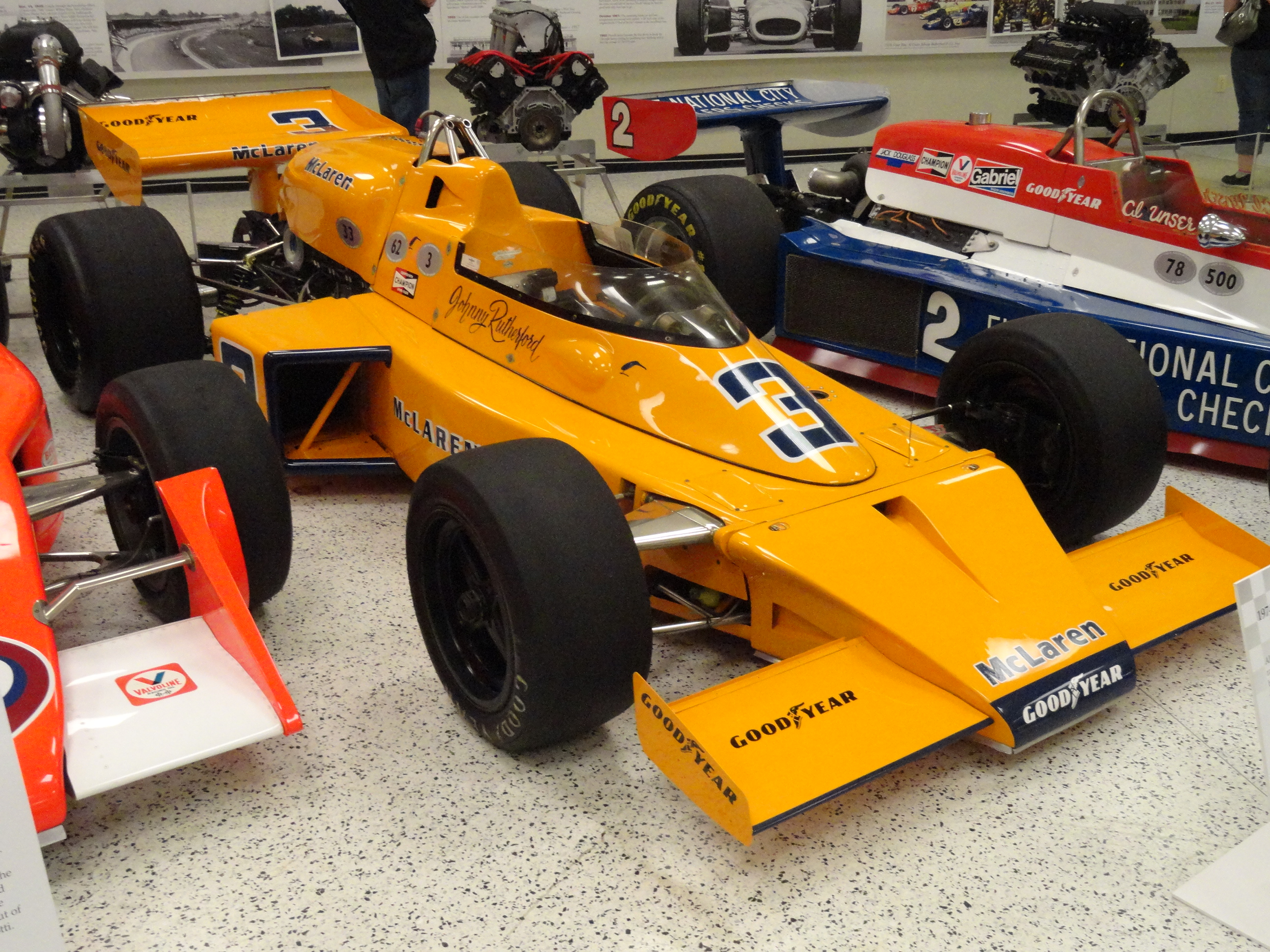
Rutherford's winning car from the 1974 Indianapolis 500.

Rutherford won pole position at the Indianapolis 500 in 1973, 1976, and 1980. In 1973, Rutherford set a one-lap track record of 199.071 mph, falling just shy of becoming the first driver to break the 200 mph barrier at Indianapolis. His long-awaited second career win came at the Ontario Motor Speedway in 1973, and victories at the Indianapolis 500 followed in 1974, 1976 and 1980. In 1984, at Michigan International Speedway, Rutherford set an all time Indy car qualifying lap speed record of 215.189 mph. His win in the 1986 Michigan 500 at the age of 48 made him the oldest winner of a 500-mile race, a record that still stands. From 1973 to 1981, Rutherford recorded nine straight seasons with a victory making him one of just six drivers in Indy Car history to do so.

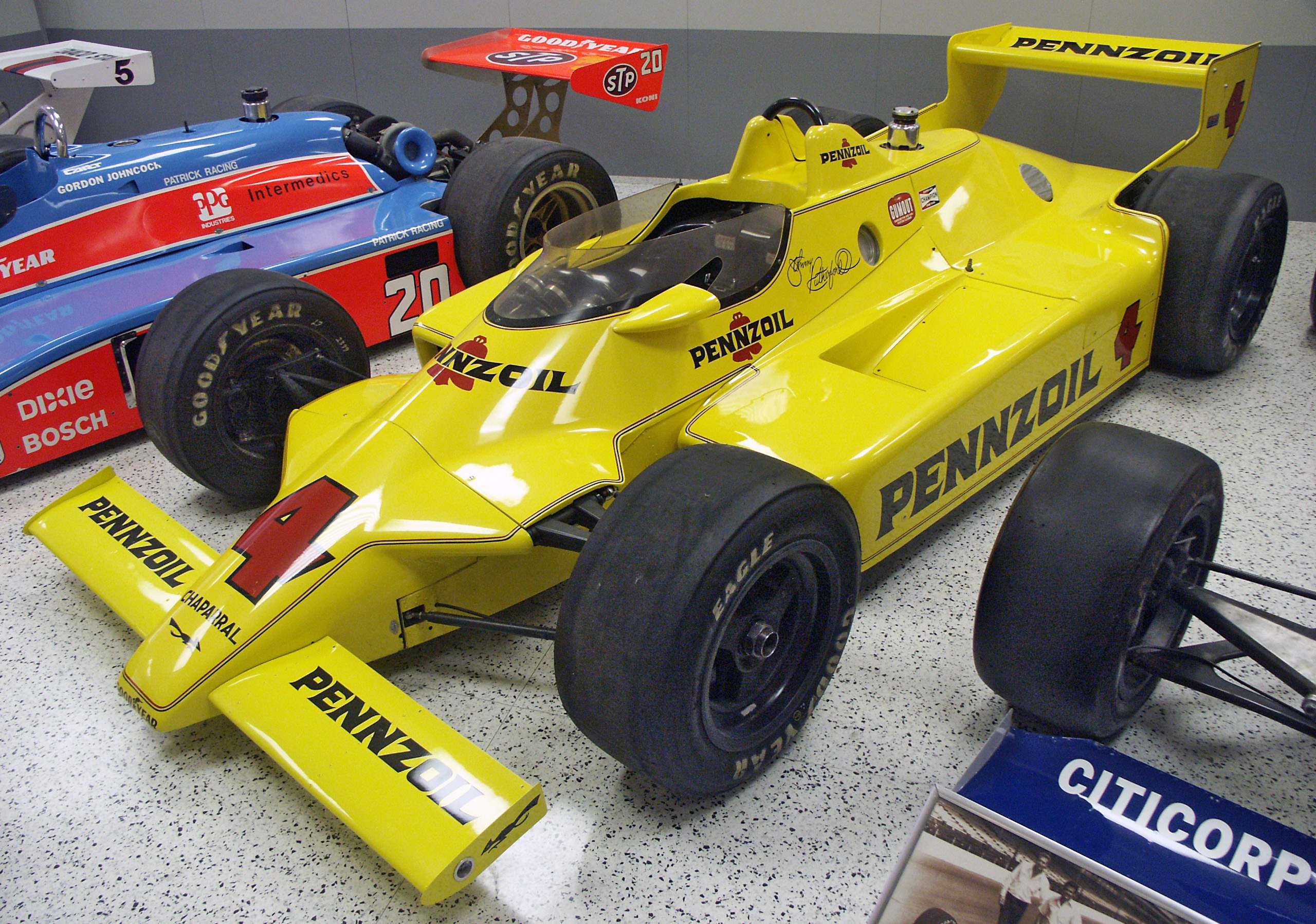
Rutherford's winning car from the 1980 Indianapolis 500.

In October 1977, Rutherford travelled 'down under' to compete in Australia's most famous motor race, the Bathurst 1000 km (600 mi) touring car race at the Mount Panorama Circuit. There, partnering fellow Indianapolis racer Janet Guthrie (who earlier that year had become the first woman to qualify for the Indianapolis 500), Rutherford drove a V8 powered Holden Torana for the team that had won the 1976 race, Ron Hodgson Motors. Driving a completely unfamiliar car (Australian cars have the steering wheel on the right side of the car) on a 6.172 km (3.835 mi) public road course carved into the side of a mountain, Rutherford qualified 26th out of sixty starters. During practice he complained about his car as it was not as good as the teams lead car driven by 1976 winners Bob Morris and John Fitzpatrick (JR was 8.2 seconds slower). Morris then got in the car and while not as quick as his own Torana, easily lapped over five seconds faster showing the problem was simply JR's lack of familiarity with the car and track. Wisely, JR made a cautious start to the race (another new experience was the standing start), but his race would come effectively to an end on lap 8 when he attempted to lap the Ford Escort RS2000 of 1966 winner Bob Holden. The Torana and Escort made contact and Rutherford ended up crashing into an earth bank at the top of The Mountain. The bent Torana was then brought back to the pits on the back of a tilt-tray truck (with the race still going at full speed and cars passing the truck going along the 2 km long Conrod Straight at over 150 mph (241 km/h)). It was then disqualified before being reinstated. Rutherford then completed another five laps before finally retiring with Guthrie not getting to drive.

Rutherford's NASCAR Winston Cup career included 35 starts from 1963 to 1988. He won in his first start, at Daytona International Speedway driving for Smokey Yunick. The win, in the second 100-mile Daytona 500 qualifying race, made him one of the youngest drivers ever to win a full points-paying NASCAR race, as well as the only driver until Shane van Gisbergen in 2023 to have won in their first start in the Cup Series. (Until 1971, the qualifying races were full points-paying races.) In 1981, Rutherford drove twelve races, the most he ever raced in a single NASCAR season. He competed in the 1988 NASCAR Christmas 500 at the Calder Park Thunderdome in Melbourne, where he finished seventeenth after starting in third. Rutherford competed in five runnings of the International Race of Champions – 1975, 1977, 1978, 1980 and 1984.

== Post-racing career ==
Rutherford's 24th and final start at the Indianapolis 500 would come in 1988. By that time he was running only a part-time schedule, and was splitting time working as a television analyst on NBC, CBS, and ESPN. Starting in 1989, Rutherford also began serving as the driver analyst on the IMS Radio Network, a position he would hold in most years through 2002.

When not racing or working in broadcasting, Rutherford served as the pace car driver for the CART series. He also served as a driver coach, evaluating rookies during rookie orientation and rookie tests. He failed to qualify at Indy in three attempts (1989, 1990, 1992) and was not able to secure a ride in 1991 or 1993. During the month of May 1994, Rutherford officially retired from racing. He was never able to achieve his milestone 25th Indy 500 start.

At the inception of the Indy Racing League in 1996, Rutherford took a full-time position as an official, serving as pace car driver (until 2016) and driver coach. Rutherford also served as a racing consultant for Team Pennzoil, and later, as an ambassador for Arrow McLaren.

== Personal life ==
Although "Lone Star JR" proudly displayed the flag of Texas on his racing helmet, Rutherford was actually born in Coffeyville, Kansas and moved to Texas at a young age.

Rutherford met Betty Hoyer, a nurse, at the Indianapolis Motor Speedway in 1963 when he was taking his rookie test. They married two months later and were a highly visible and inseparable couple throughout Johnny's racing career. His first Indy 500 win in 1974, with Betty looking on from the pits, helped to end the superstition in American racing against allowing women in the pit area.

Rutherford was the honorary chairman of the Amelia Island Concours d'Elegance in 2006.

Rutherford was a talented artist during his school, and after the conclusion of his racing career devoted time to renewing his skill. Rutherford's art was featured on the program cover of the 2021 Indianapolis 500.

Rutherford, who has been invited to The White House on behalf of Indy on multiple occasions, is considered a popular ambassador and spokesman for the sport of Indy car racing.

== Awards ==
- Inducted into the International Motorsports Hall of Fame in 1996
- Inducted in the National Sprint Car Hall of Fame in 1995
- Inducted in the Motorsports Hall of Fame of America in 1996
- Inducted in the Indianapolis Motor Speedway Hall of Fame in 1987

== Motorsports career results ==
=== NASCAR ===
(key) (Bold – Pole position awarded by qualifying time. Italics – Pole position earned by points standings or practice time. * – Most laps led.)

==== Grand National Series ====
NASCAR Grand National Series results
Year	Team	No.	Make	1	2	3	4	5	6	7	8	9	10	11	12	13	14	15	16	17	18	19	20	21	22	23	24	25	26	27	28	29	30	31	32	33	34	35	36	37	38	39	40	41	42	43	44	45	46	47	48	49	50	51	52	53	54	55	56	57	58	59	60	61	62	NGNC	Pts	Ref
1963	Smokey Yunick	13	Chevy	BIR	GGS	THS	RSD	DAY	DAY; 1	DAY; 9	PIF	AWS	HBO	ATL	HCY	BRI	AUG	RCH	GPS	SBO	BGS	MAR	NWS	CLB	THS	DAR	ODS	RCH	CLT	BIR	ATL	DAY	MBS	SVH	DTS	BGS	ASH	OBS	BRR	BRI	GPS	NSV	CLB	AWS	PIF	BGS	ONA	DAR	HCY	RCH	MAR	DTS	NWS	THS	CLT	SBO	HBO	RSD								NA	-	
1964	Bud Moore Engineering	01	Mercury	CON	AUG	JSP	SVH	RSD	DAY; 18	DAY	DAY; 26	RCH	BRI	GPS	BGS	ATL	AWS	HBO	PIF	CLB	NWS	MAR	SVH	DAR	LGY	HCY	SBO	CLT	GPS	ASH	ATL	CON	NSV	CHT	BIR	VAL	PIF																													NA	-	
1964	Holman-Moody	0	Ford																																			DAY; 7	ODS	OBS	BRR	ISP	GLN	LIN	BRI	NSV	MBS	AWS	DTS	ONA	CLB	BGS	STR	DAR	HCY	RCH	ODS	HBO	MAR	SVH	NWS	CLT	HAR	AUG	JAC	NA	-	
1965		77	Ford	RSD	DAY	DAY	DAY	PIF	ASW	RCH	HBO	ATL; 13	GPS	NWS	MAR	CLB	BRI	DAR	LGY	BGS	HCY	CLT	CCF	ASH	HAR	NSV	BIR	ATL	GPS	MBS	VAL	DAY	ODS	OBS	ISP	GLN	BRI	NSV	CCF	AWS	SMR	PIF	AUG	CLB	DTS	BLV	BGS	DAR	HCY	LIN	ODS	RCH	MAR	NWS	CLT	HBO	CAR	DTS								NA	-	
1966	Curtis Satterfield	33	Chevy	AUG	RSD	DAY; 23	DAY	DAY; 28	CAR	BRI	ATL	HCY	CLB	GPS	BGS	NWS	MAR	DAR	LGY	MGR	MON	RCH	CLT	DTS	ASH	PIF	SMR	AWS	BLV	GPS	DAY	ODS	BRR	OXF	FON	ISP	BRI	SMR	NSV	ATL	CLB	AWS	BLV	BGS	DAR	HCY	RCH	HBO	MAR	NWS	CLT	CAR														NA	-	

==== Winston Cup Series ====
NASCAR Winston Cup Series results
Year	Team	No.	Make	1	2	3	4	5	6	7	8	9	10	11	12	13	14	15	16	17	18	19	20	21	22	23	24	25	26	27	28	29	30	31	NWCC	Pts	Ref
1972	Donlavey Racing	90	Ford	RSD	DAY	RCH	ONT	CAR	ATL	BRI	DAR	NWS	MAR	TAL	CLT	DOV	MCH	RSD	TWS	DAY	BRI	TRN	ATL	TAL	MCH	NSV	DAR	RCH	DOV	MAR	NWS	CLT	CAR	TWS; 26	NA	-	
1973	B & B Racing	61	Chevy	RSD	DAY	RCH	CAR	BRI	ATL	NWS	DAR	MAR	TAL	NSV	CLT	DOV	TWS	RSD	MCH	DAY	BRI	ATL	TAL	NSV	DAR	RCH	DOV	NWS	MAR	CLT	CAR; 13				NA	-	
1974	B & B Racing	61	Chevy	RSD	DAY; 24	RCH	CAR	BRI	ATL	DAR	NWS	MAR	TAL	NSV	DOV	CLT	RSD	MCH	DAY; 39	BRI	NSV	ATL	POC	TAL	MCH	DAR	RCH	DOV	NWS	MAR					82nd	4.16	
1974	Howard & Egerton Racing	1	Chevy																												CLT; 24	CAR	ONT		82nd	4.16	
1975	DiGard Motorsports	08	Chevy	RSD	DAY; 27	RCH	CAR	BRI																											NA	-	
1975	Norris Reed	83	Chevy						ATL; 32	NWS	DAR	MAR	TAL	NSV	DOV	CLT	RSD	MCH	DAY; 40	NSV	POC	TAL	MCH	DAR	DOV	NWS	MAR	CLT; 34	RCH	CAR	BRI	ATL	ONT		NA	-	
1976	Johnny Ray	77	Chevy	RSD	DAY	CAR	RCH	BRI	ATL	NWS	DAR	MAR	TAL	NSV	DOV	CLT	RSD	MCH	DAY; 20	NSV	POC	TAL	MCH	BRI	DAR	RCH	DOV	MAR	NWS	CLT; 31	CAR	ATL	ONT		NA	-	
1977	Johnny Ray	77	Chevy	RSD	DAY; 41	RCH	CAR	ATL; 40	NWS	DAR	BRI	MAR	TAL	NSV	DOV	CLT	RSD	MCH	DAY	NSV	POC														NA	-	
1977	A. J. Foyt Enterprises	51	Chevy																			TAL; 21	MCH	BRI	DAR	RCH	DOV	MAR	NWS	CLT	CAR	ATL	ONT		NA	-	
1981	Benfield Racing	98	Pontiac	RSD	DAY; 10	RCH	CAR; 12	ATL; 12	BRI	NWS	DAR; 28	MAR	TAL	NSV	DOV	CLT	TWS	RSD	MCH; 17	DAY; 5	NSV	POC	TAL	MCH; 13	BRI	DAR; 33	RCH; 31	DOV	MAR	NWS					33rd	1140	
1981	Benfield Racing	98	Buick																												CLT; 27	CAR; 29	ATL; 37	RSD	33rd	1140	
1988	Bob Clark Motorsports	31	Olds	DAY	RCH	CAR	ATL	DAR	BRI	NWS	MAR	TAL	CLT	DOV	RSD	POC	MCH	DAY	POC	TAL	GLN	MCH	BRI	DAR	RCH	DOV	MAR	CLT	NWS	CAR	PHO; 39	ATL			89th	46	

==== Daytona 500 ====
Year	Team	Manufacturer	Start	Finish
1963	Smokey Yunick	Chevrolet	4	9
1964	Bud Moore Engineering	Mercury	35	26
1966	Curtis Satterfield	Chevrolet	42	28
1974	B & B Racing	Chevrolet	17	24
1975	DiGard Motorsports	Chevrolet	11	27
1977	Johnny Ray	Chevrolet	40	41
1981	Benfield Racing	Pontiac	35	10

=== International Race of Champions ===
(key) (Bold – Pole position. * – Most laps led.)

International Race of Champions results
Year	Make	Q1	Q2	Q3	1	2	3	4	Pos.	Pts	Ref
1974–75	Chevy				MCH; 8	RSD; 9	RSD; 7	DAY; 9	9th	-	
1976–77	Chevy				MCH; 2	RSD; 5	RSD; 7	DAY; 5	4th	-	
1977–78	Chevy				MCH; 8	RSD; 7	RSD; 9	DAY; 9	9th	-	
1978–79	Chevy	MCH	MCH; 6	RSD	RSD	ATL			NA	-	
1979–80	Chevy	MCH	**MCH**; 4	RSD	RSD; 6	ATL; 3			6th	24	
1984	Chevy				MCH; 6	CLE; 9	TAL; 4	MCH; 9	8th	33	

=== American open–wheel racing results ===
(key)

==== Complete USAC Championship Car results ====
Year	Team	1	2	3	4	5	6	7	8	9	10	11	12	13	14	15	16	17	18	19	20	21	22	23	24	25	26	27	28	Pos	Points
1962	Fred Sclavi	TRE	INDY	MIL	LAN	TRE	SPR	MIL	LAN	SYR	ISF; 15																			25th	80
1962	Federal Engineering											TRE; 14																		25th	80
1962	Ollie Prather												SAC; 7	PHX; 11																25th	80
1963	Dayton-Walther	TRE; 10	INDY; DNQ	MIL; 20																										10th	640
1963	Ed Kostenuk		INDY; 29		LAN; 7	TRE; 16																								10th	640
1963	Racing Associates						SPR; 5	MIL; 7	DUQ; 10	ISF; 4	TRE; 6	SAC; 17	PHX; 11																	10th	640
1964	Racing Associates	PHX; 21	TRE; Wth	INDY; 27	MIL; 22	LAN; 12	TRE; 17	SPR; 17	MIL; 5	DUQ; 7	ISF; 18	TRE; Wth	SAC; 14	PHX; 23																21st	270
1965	Racing Associates	PHX; 15		INDY; 31																										12th	993
1965	Beletsky		TRE; 11																											12th	993
1965	J. Frank Harrison				MIL; 15																									12th	993
1965	Gilbert Morcroft					LAN; DNQ	PPR																							12th	993
1965	Leader Cards							TRE; DNS	IRP; 11	ATL; 1	LAN; 8	MIL; 13	SPR; 4	MIL; 24	DSF; 5	ISF; 6	TRE; 16	SAC; 6	PHX; 22											12th	993
1966	Leader Cards	PHX; 18	TRE	INDY	MIL	LAN	ATL	PIP	IRP	LAN	SPR	MIL	DUQ	ISF	TRE	SAC	PHX													-	0
1967	W & W Enterprises	PHX	TRE	INDY; 25	MIL; 12	LAN; 10	PIP	MOS; 14	MOS; 14	IRP; 13	LAN; 20	MTR; 15	MTR	SPR; 16	MIL; 25	DUQ; 11	ISF; 16	TRE; Wth	SAC; 5	HAN; 23	PHX; 22	RIV; 8								21st	315
1968	E.R.E. Enterprises	HAN; 20	LVG; 11	PHX; 17	TRE	INDY; 18	MIL; 4	MOS	MOS	LAN	PIP	CDR; 20	NAZ																	18th	890
1968	Mitchner Racing													IRP; 24	IRP; 20			MTR; 5	MTR; 5	SPR	MIL; 11	DUQ	ISF	TRE; 5	SAC	MCH; 16	HAN; 25	PHX; 17	RIV; 6	18th	890
1968	Gerhardt															LAN; 25	LAN													18th	890
1969	Patrick Racing	PHX; DNS	HAN; 4	INDY; 29	MIL; 5	LAN; 15	PIP	CDR; 11	NAZ	TRE; 22	IRP; Wth	IRP	MIL; Wth	SPR				BRN; 11	BRN	TRE; 12	SAC	KEN; 19	KEN	PHX; 4	RIV; 5					11th	1.130
1969	Leader Cards														DOV; 7															11th	1.130
1969	Tim Delrose															DUQ; 14	ISF; DNQ													11th	1.130
1970	Patrick Racing	PHX	SON; 5	TRE; 20	INDY; 18	MIL; 14	LAN; DNQ	CDR	MCH; 3	IRP; 17	SPR; 11	MIL; 21	ONT; 31	DUQ; 11	ISF; DNQ	SED; 12	TRE; 4	SAC; 13	PHX; 6											12th	960
1971	Vollstedt	RAF; 7	RAF; 20																											19th	570
1971	Patrick Racing			PHX; 21	TRE; 17	INDY; 18	MIL; 6	POC; 7	MCH; 10	MIL	ONT; 26	TRE; Wth	PHX; 22																	19th	570
1972	Patrick Racing	PHX; 13	TRE; Wth	INDY; 27																										7th	1,620
1972	Gerhardt				MIL; 21	MCH; 16	POC; 2	MIL; 3	ONT; 10	TRE; 6	PHX; 5																			7th	1,620
1973	Team McLaren	TWS; 4	TRE; 15	TRE	INDY; 9	MIL; 5	POC; 5	MCH; 2	MIL; 18	ONT	ONT; 1	ONT; 31	MCH; 3	MCH; 1	TRE; 4	TWS; 2	PHX; Wth													3rd	2.595
1974	Team McLaren		ONT; 1	ONT; 27	PHX; 7	TRE; 6	INDY; 1	MIL; 1	POC; 1	MCH; 4	MIL; 5	MCH; 9	TRE; 4	TRE; 7	PHX; 7															2nd	3,650
1975	Team McLaren		ONT; 2	ONT; 17	PHX; 1	TRE; 2	INDY; 2	MIL; 3	POC; 6	MCH; 6	MIL; 13	MCH; 2	TRE; 3	PHX; 11																2nd	2,900
1976	Team McLaren	PHX; 18	TRE; 1	INDY; 1	MIL; 9	POC; 4	MCH; 2	TWS; 3	TRE; 7	MIL; 3	ONT; 2	MCH; 11	TWS; 1	PHX; 16																2nd	4,220
1977	Team McLaren	ONT; 25	PHX; 1	TWS; 4	TRE; 8	INDY; 33	MIL; 1	POC; 5	MOS; 9	MCH; 3	TWS; 1	MIL; 1	ONT; 24	MCH; 2	PHX; 22															3rd	2.840
1978	Team McLaren	PHX; 16	ONT; 13	TWS; 19	TRE; 10	INDY; 13	MOS; 8	MIL; 2	POC; 2	MCH; 1	ATL; 2	TWS; 2	MIL; 8	ONT; 11	MCH; 13	TRE; 11	SIL; 5	BRH; 3	PHX; 1											4th	3,067
1979	Team McLaren	ONT	TWS	INDY; 18	MIL	POC	TWS	MIL																						-	0
1980	Chaparral Cars	ONT; 1	INDY; 1	MIL; 2	POC; 2	MOH; 1																								1st	2,740
1981-82	Chaparral Cars	INDY; 32	POC	ILL	DUQ	ISF	INDY; 8																							-	0
1982-83	Patrick Racing	SPR	DUQ	NAZ	INDY; Wth																									-	0
1983-84	Gilmore Racing	DUQ	INDY; 22																											25th	15

==== PPG Indycar Series ====
(key) (Races in bold indicate pole position)

Year	Team	1	2	3	4	5	6	7	8	9	10	11	12	13	14	15	16	17	Rank	Points	Ref
1979	Team McLaren	PHX; 3	**ATL**; 1	**ATL**; 1	INDY; 18	TRE; 15	TRE; 3	MCH; 3	MCH; 11	WGL; 15	TRE; 5	ONT; 4	MCH; 4	ATL; 11	PHX; 6				**4th**	**2163**	
1980	Chaparral Cars	**ONT**; 1	**INDY**; 1	MIL; 2	POC; 2	MOH; 1	MCH; 1	WGL; 5	**MIL**; 1	ONT; 2	MCH; 4	MEX; 10	PHX; 13						**1st**	**4723**	
1981	Chaparral Cars	PHX; 1	MIL; 6	**ATL**; 2	ATL; 3	MCH; 22	RIV; 21	**MIL**; 4	MCH; 20	WGL; 2	MEX; 26	PHX; 21							**5th**	**120**	
1982	Chaparral Cars	PHX; 4	ATL; DNS	MIL; 15	CLE; 23	MCH; 28	MIL; 17	POC; 12	RIV; 3	ROA; 12	MCH; DNS	PHX; 21							**12th**	**62**	
1983	Patrick Racing	ATL; 18	INDY; Wth	MIL	CLE	MCH	ROA	POC; 21	RIV	MOH	MCH; 23	CPL; 24	LAG; DNQ	PHX; 20					**NC**	**0**	
1984	Doug Shierson Racing	LBH	PHX	INDY; DNQ															**22nd**	**20**	
1984	Gilmore Racing			INDY; 22	MIL	POR	MEA	CLE	MCH; 7	ROA	POC; 28	MOH							**22nd**	**20**	
1984	Team Penske												SAN; 5	**MCH**; 14	PHX; 11	LAG	CPL		**22nd**	**20**	
1985	Alex Morales Motorsports	LBH; 10	INDY; 6	MIL; 23	POR; 9	MEA; 14	CLE; 15	MCH; 4	ROA; DNS	POC; 14	MOH; 22	SAN; 1	MCH; 9	LAG; 21	PHX; 26	MIA; 19			**11th**	**51**	
1986	Alex Morales Motorsports	PHX; 5	LBH; 9	INDY; 8	MIL; 4	POR; 15	MEA; 7	CLE; 10	TOR; 10	MCH; 1	POC; 18	MOH; 8	SAN; 16	MCH; 9	ROA; 14	LAG; 12	PHX; 9	MIA; 12	**11th**	**78**	
1987	Alex Morales Motorsports	LBH; 23	PHX; 9	INDY; 11	MIL; 9	POR; 7	MEA; 11	CLE; 9	TOR; 21	MCH; 28	POC; 26	ROA; 24	MOH; 12	NAZ; 20	LAG; 15	MIA; 16			**18th**	**23**	
1988	King Racing	PHX	LBH	INDY; 22	MIL	POR	CLE	TOR	MEA										**43rd**	**0**	
1988	A. J. Foyt Enterprises									MCH; 18	POC	MOH	ROA	NAZ	LAG	MIA			**43rd**	**0**	
1989	Team Menard	PHX	LBH	INDY; DNQ															**27th**	**3**	
1989	A. J. Foyt Enterprises			INDY; DNQ	MIL	DET	POR	CLE	MEA	TOR									**27th**	**3**	
1989	Stoops Racing										MCH; 10	POC; 13	MOH	ROA					**27th**	**3**	
1989	Machinists Union Racing														NAZ; DNS	LAG			**27th**	**3**	
1990	Stoops Racing	PHX	LBH	INDY; DNQ	MIL	DET	POR	CLE	MEA	TOR	MCH	DEN	VAN	MOH	ROA	NAZ	LAG		NC	-	
1992	Walker Racing	SRF	PHX	LBH	INDY; DNQ	DET	POR	MIL	NHA	TOR	MCH	CLE	ROA	VAN	MOH	NAZ	LAG		NC	-	

==== Indianapolis 500 results ====
Year	Chassis	Engine	Start	Finish	Team/Entrant
1963	Watson	Offy	26th	29th	Ed Kostenuk
1964	Watson	Offy	15th	27th	Racing Associates
1965	Halibrand	Ford	11th	31st	Racing Associates
1966	Did not compete due to injury				
1967	Eagle	Ford	19th	25th	W&W Enterprises
1968	Eagle	Ford	21st	18th	Alan Green
1969	Eagle	Offy	17th	29th	Michner Petroleum
1970	Eagle	Offy	2nd	18th	Michner Petroleum
1971	Eagle	Offy	24th	18th	Michner Petroleum
1972	Brabham	Offy	8th	27th	Michner-Patrick Racing
1973	McLaren	Offy	**1st**	9th	McLaren Intl
1974	McLaren	Offy	25th	**1st**	McLaren Intl
1975	McLaren	Offy	7th	2nd	McLaren Intl
1976	McLaren	Offy	**1st**	**1st**	McLaren Intl
1977	McLaren	Cosworth	17th	33rd	McLaren Intl
1978	McLaren	Cosworth	4th	13th	McLaren Intl
1979	McLaren	Cosworth	8th	18th	McLaren Intl
1980	Chaparral	Cosworth	**1st**	**1st**	Chaparral Racing
1981	Chaparral	Cosworth	5th	32nd	Chaparral Racing
1982	Chaparral	Cosworth	12th	8th	Chaparral Racing
1983	Wildcat	Cosworth	Practice Crash		Patrick Racing
1984	March	Cosworth	30th	22nd	Foyt
1985	March	Cosworth	30th	6th	Morales
1986	March	Cosworth	12th	8th	Morales
1987	March	Cosworth	8th	11th	Morales
1988	Lola	Buick	30th	22nd	King Racing
1989	Lola	Cosworth	Failed to Qualify		Foyt
1990	Lola	Cosworth	Failed to Qualify		Stoops Racing
1991	Did not enter				
1992	Lola	Chevrolet	Failed to Qualify		Walker Racing
1994	Retired				

== Bibliography ==
- Higdon, Hal (15 September 2021). Johnny Rutherford. Octane Press. ISBN 9781642340648.

Preceded by Gordon Johncock	Indianapolis 500 Winner; 1974	Succeeded by Bobby Unser
Preceded by Bobby Unser	Indianapolis 500 Winner; 1976	Succeeded by A. J. Foyt
Preceded by Rick Mears	Indianapolis 500 Winner; 1980	Succeeded by Bobby Unser
Preceded by Rick Mears	PPG Indycar World Series Champion; 1980	Succeeded by Rick Mears
