= IROC II =

Motor car races held in 1974–1975

IROC II was the second year of IROC competition, which took place over three weekends in 1974 and 1975. It saw the use of the Chevrolet Camaro in all races, which replaced the Porsche Carrera RSR race cars used in the first year of competition. The only track carried over from the first year was Riverside International Raceway, as the series raced on the oval at Daytona International Speedway instead of the infield road course. Michigan International Speedway was also added as the second oval in the schedule, which consisted of four races. Bobby Unser won the series championship and $41,000.

The roster of drivers and final points standings were as follows:

Rank	Driver	Winnings	Series
1	(United States) Bobby Unser	$41,000	USAC Champ Car
2	(United States) A. J. Foyt	$27,600	USAC Champ Car
3	(United States) Cale Yarborough	$22,200	NASCAR Winston Cup
4	(United States) Bobby Allison	$20,400	NASCAR Winston Cup
5	(Brazil) Emerson Fittipaldi	$18,300	Formula One
6	(United States) David Pearson	$16,500	NASCAR Winston Cup
7	(United States) George Follmer	$15,300	SCCA
8	(Sweden) Ronnie Peterson	$12,300	Formula One
9	(United States) Johnny Rutherford	$9,900	USAC Champ Car
10	(United States) Richard Petty	$6,000	NASCAR Winston Cup
11	(United Kingdom) Graham Hill	$5,400	Formula One
12	(South Africa) Jody Scheckter	$4,500	Formula One

== Race results ==
=== Michigan International Speedway, Race One ===
1. Bobby Unser
2. Cale Yarborough
3. David Pearson
4. Bobby Allison
5. George Follmer
6. Emerson Fittipaldi
7. Ronnie Peterson
8. Johnny Rutherford
9. A. J. Foyt
10. Richard Petty
11. Graham Hill
12. Jody Scheckter

=== Riverside International Raceway, Race Two ===
1. Emerson Fittipaldi
2. George Follmer
3. A. J. Foyt
4. David Pearson
5. Richard Petty
6. Jody Scheckter
7. Ronnie Peterson
8. Cale Yarborough
9. Johnny Rutherford
10. Graham Hill
11. Bobby Unser
12. Bobby Allison

=== Riverside International Raceway, Race Three ===
1. Bobby Allison
2. Bobby Unser
3. Emerson Fittipaldi
4. A. J. Foyt
5. George Follmer
6. Graham Hill
7. Johnny Rutherford
8. Ronnie Peterson
9. Cale Yarborough
10. Richard Petty
11. David Pearson
12. Jody Scheckter

=== Daytona International Speedway, Race Four ===
1. Bobby Unser
2. A. J. Foyt
3. Cale Yarborough
4. Bobby Allison
5. David Pearson
6. Emerson Fittipaldi
7. Ronnie Peterson
8. George Follmer
9. Johnny Rutherford
