= Chevrolet Camaro (third generation) =

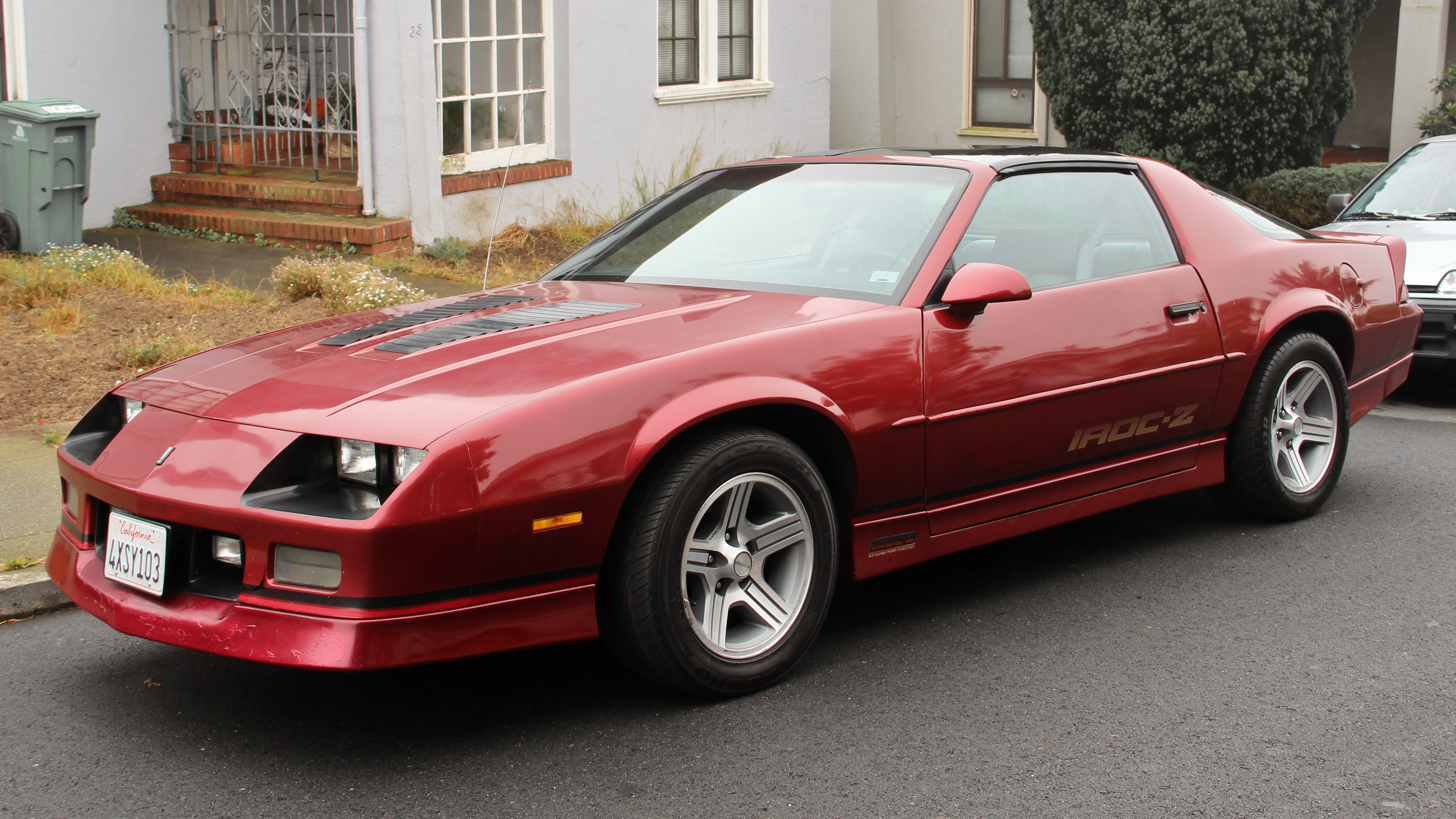
- Chevrolet Camaro IROC-Z

Overview
- Manufacturer: Chevrolet (General Motors)
- Production: October 12, 1981 – August 27, 1992
- Model years: 1982–1992
- Assembly: United States: Van Nuys, California; United States: Norwood, Ohio (1982–1987 only)
- Designer: Jerry Palmer (1978)

Body and chassis
- Class: Pony car; Muscle car
- Body style: 2-door liftback; 2-door convertible
- Layout: FR layout
- Platform: F-body
- Related: Pontiac Firebird (third generation)

Powertrain
- Engine: 151 cu in (2.5 L) LQ8/LQ9 I4; 173 cu in (2.8 L) LC1 V6 (1982–1984); 173 cu in (2.8 L) LB8 V6 (1985–1989); 191 cu in (3.1 L) LH0 V6 (1990–1992); 305 cu in (5.0 L) LU5/LG4/L69/L03/LB9 V8; 350 cu in (5.7 L) L98 V8
- Transmission: 4-speed manual; 5-speed manual; 3-speed automatic; 4-speed automatic

Dimensions
- Wheelbase: 2,565 mm (101.0 in)
- Length: 1982–1987: 4,877 mm (192.0 in); 1988–1992: 4,890 mm (192.5 in)
- Width: 1,850 mm (72.8 in)
- Height: 1982–1987: 1,275 mm (50.2 in); 1988–1992 Coupe: 1,280 mm (50.4 in); 1991–1992 Convertible: 1,283 mm (50.5 in)
- Curb weight: 1,400–1,525 kg (3,086.5–3,362.0 lb)

Chronology
- Predecessor: Chevrolet Camaro (second generation)
- Successor: Chevrolet Camaro (fourth generation)

The third-generation Chevrolet Camaro is an American pony car which was introduced for the 1982 model year by Chevrolet. It continued to use General Motors' F-body platform and produced a "20th Anniversary Commemorative Edition" for 1987 and "25th Anniversary Heritage Edition" for 1992. These were also the first Camaros with factory fuel injection, four-speed automatic transmissions, five-speed manual transmissions, four-cylinder engines, 16-inch wheels, and hatchback bodies. For 1987 a convertible Camaro was reintroduced, converted by ASC in relatively small numbers. The third-generation Camaro continued through the 1992 model year.

== Design ==
The Camaro's design was dissimilar to previous generations. The large and complex rear window reflected recent advances in car glass design. The front windshield reclined at 62 degrees, thus breaking an internal GM rule limiting such angles to sixty degrees. The rear seat folded down to expand the luggage compartment, which was accessed through a large rear hatch.

== 1982 ==
The third-generation Camaro was released for sale in December 1981, beginning production on October 12, 1981. The 1982 model introduced the first Camaros with a hatchback body style, and such options as factory fuel injection, and a four-cylinder engine. The Camaro Z28 was Motor Trend magazine's Car of the Year for 1982. Three models were available: Sport Coupe, Berlinetta, and Z28. 173,000 Camaros were sold in the United States in 1982. 12 percent of buyers took the four-cylinder, 37 percent the V6, while 51 percent opted for the V8.

The Sport Coupe came standard with the 2.5 L (151 cu in) LQ9 four-cylinder engine. The 2.8 L (173 cu in) LC1 V6 and the 5.0 L (305 cu in) LG4 V8 were optional. Dog dish-style hubcaps were standard; full wheel covers were optional as were steel, five-spoke 14x7-inch body-colored rally wheels.

The Berlinetta came with the standard 2.8 LC1 V6 or the optional 5.0 LG4 V8. This package also sported unique 14x7-inch finned aluminum wheel with gold accenting and a 'Berlinetta' center cap. Its own lower-body pinstriping, gold 'Berlinetta' badging, and headlamp pockets were painted in an accent color. The taillights got a gold and black horizontal divider bar. The interior came standard with custom cloth interior, a rear storage well cover, and additional carpeting on rear wheelhouses. It also came standard with additional body insulation and full instrumentation.

The Z28 came standard with the 5.0 L LG4 4-bbl V8 rated at 145 hp (108 kW) and was available with either a four-speed manual or three-speed TH200 lockup automatic transmission. The optional LU5 twin TBI 'Cross Fire Injection' 5.0 L (305 cu in) with functioning hood scoops was rated at 165 hp (123 kW) and was only available with an automatic transmission. The new Camaro received positive reviews for its styling and handling, but was also criticized for the low power ratings for the Camaro Z28.

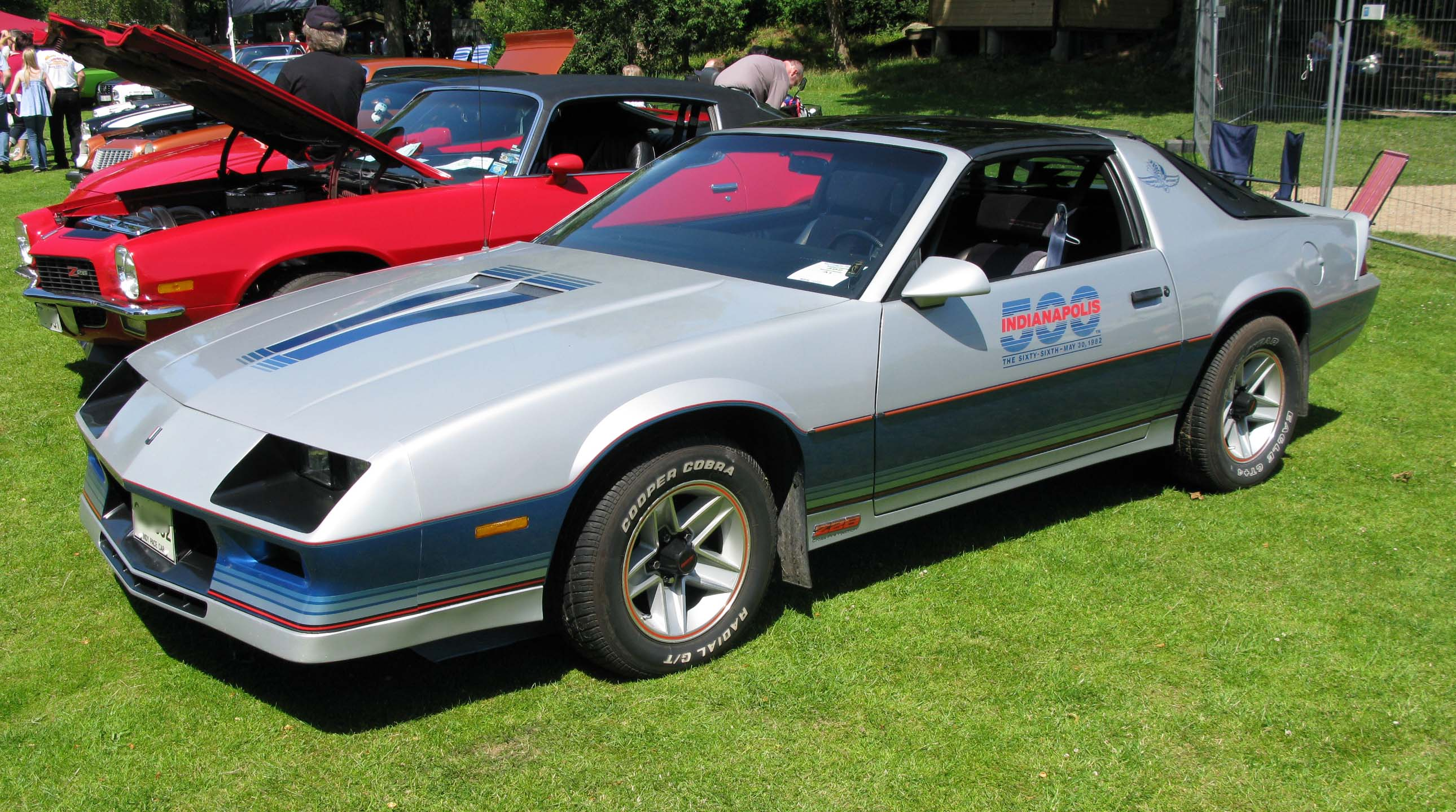
1982 Indy 500 Pace Car replica

The Z28s included lightweight fiberglass SMC hoods with functional hood air induction flaps on RPO LU5 cars. The Z28 had a different nose, a three-piece rear spoiler and front, side, as well as rear lower body valances in silver or gold. Just above the valance was a three-color lower body stripe that encircled the car. Headlamp pockets on the Z28 were black. Standard were new 15x7-inch cast-aluminum five-spoke wheels accented with silver or gold. Z28 badges appeared on the right rear bumper and on the side valances. On early models, if the "Conteur" sport seats were selected as an option, the passenger seat was purposefully a mismatched high-back bucket seat design, due to production shortages of the passenger seat.

The Camaro Z28 was the pace car for the 1982 Indianapolis 500 race, and over 6,000 appearance replicas were sold through Chevrolet dealers. The edition featured special two-tone silver/blue paint and special striping, red pin-striping on 15-inch (380 mm) Z28 wheels, and a silver/blue interior with six-way Lear-Seigler manually adjustable seating. Engine choices in the pace cars were the same as the regular production Z28. The car that actually paced the event was equipped with a highly-modified, all-aluminum 5.7 L V8 that was not available on the replica cars.

At the 1982 Geneva Motor Show, a special European specification version was shown, the Camaro Z28-E. The "E" was a limited-edition version that stood for "Export" and it received British National Type Approval in 1982. The Z28E received the 157 PS (155 hp; 115 kW) DIN carburetted 5-liter V8, while the 108 PS (107 hp; 79 kW) 2.8-liter V6 was soon added to the lineup.

The Camaro Z28-E (RPO code ZK3 on the body tag) included a very specific and complete option package as standard, many items of which were optional on the regular Z28 Camaro, such as rear disc brakes and other appearance and handling improvements. The original sales brochure shows the long list of standard equipment, while some of the standard items clearly emphasize the high performance aspect associated with export markets such as Switzerland and Japan, where even a limited slip differential were standard on the Z28-E. Pre-production press articles show that this specific export model was first to be called GT-Z Even though the article only focuses on outside specifics such as the headlamp covers and the unique taillamps, the images clearly show the similarity with the standard production Z28 cars - the Z28 wheels and ground-effect spoilers are present already on this prototype - which is why the decision was made for the Z28-E name instead of the GT-Z proposal. Though its performance figures are similar to those of the US production Z28 cars, the export models, in view of the difference in markets (often not yet having fully adopted unleaded fuel, for instance) did not have any of the usual emissions gear in place, with no EGR and open exhausts instead of catalytic convertors affecting performance somewhat to the positive. None of the production data for the Z28-E was included in total Chevrolet production, not even in the production of the Z28 numbers for those years. Research with GM and GM Heritage has yielded very little information, mention of the RPO code ZK3 is limited to a few hundred cars in the early years of Camaro production (1982-1983), going down to a few dozen cars for the years 1984-85.

== 1983 ==
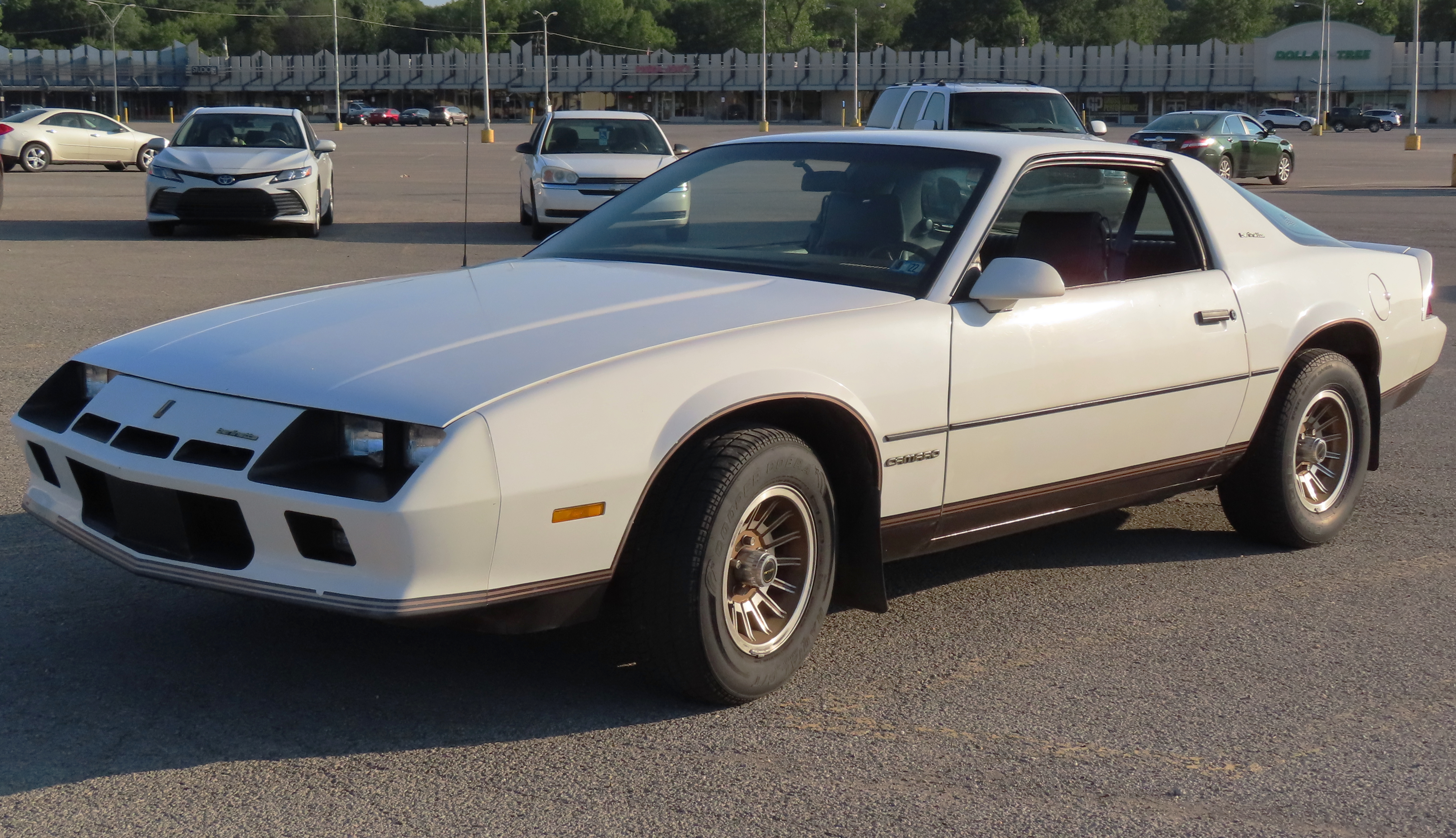
1983 Chevrolet Camaro Berlinetta

The Z28 engines were changed for 1983: the LU5 Crossfire 305 V8 was rated at 175 hp and was supplemented in April 1983 by an all-new 5.0 L L69 4 bbl 190 hp (142 kW) High-Output (HO) V8. This engine was only available with a manual transmission in 1983. Due to its late introduction, 3,223 L69 V8s were sold for the 1983 model year.

Transmissions were upgraded for 1983. A Borg-Warner 5-speed manual transmission replaced the previous 4-speed. A 4-speed automatic transmission with overdrive replaced the 3-speed automatic transmission in the Z28. The TH700-R4 automatic overdrive was also available on the base coupe and Berlinetta, but was not available with the L69 H.O. engine in the Z28 for 1983. Aside from the new transmissions, base coupe and Berlinetta carried on as in 1982 with very little change other than newly available colors.

Again, the limited edition Z28-E returned for overseas markets only. It was clearly also available in the Japanese markets, as this psychedelic commercial shows Even the casual observer will notice a standard production Z28 was used, note standard hood, taillight section and side markers, which were all different for the Z28-E.

== 1984 ==
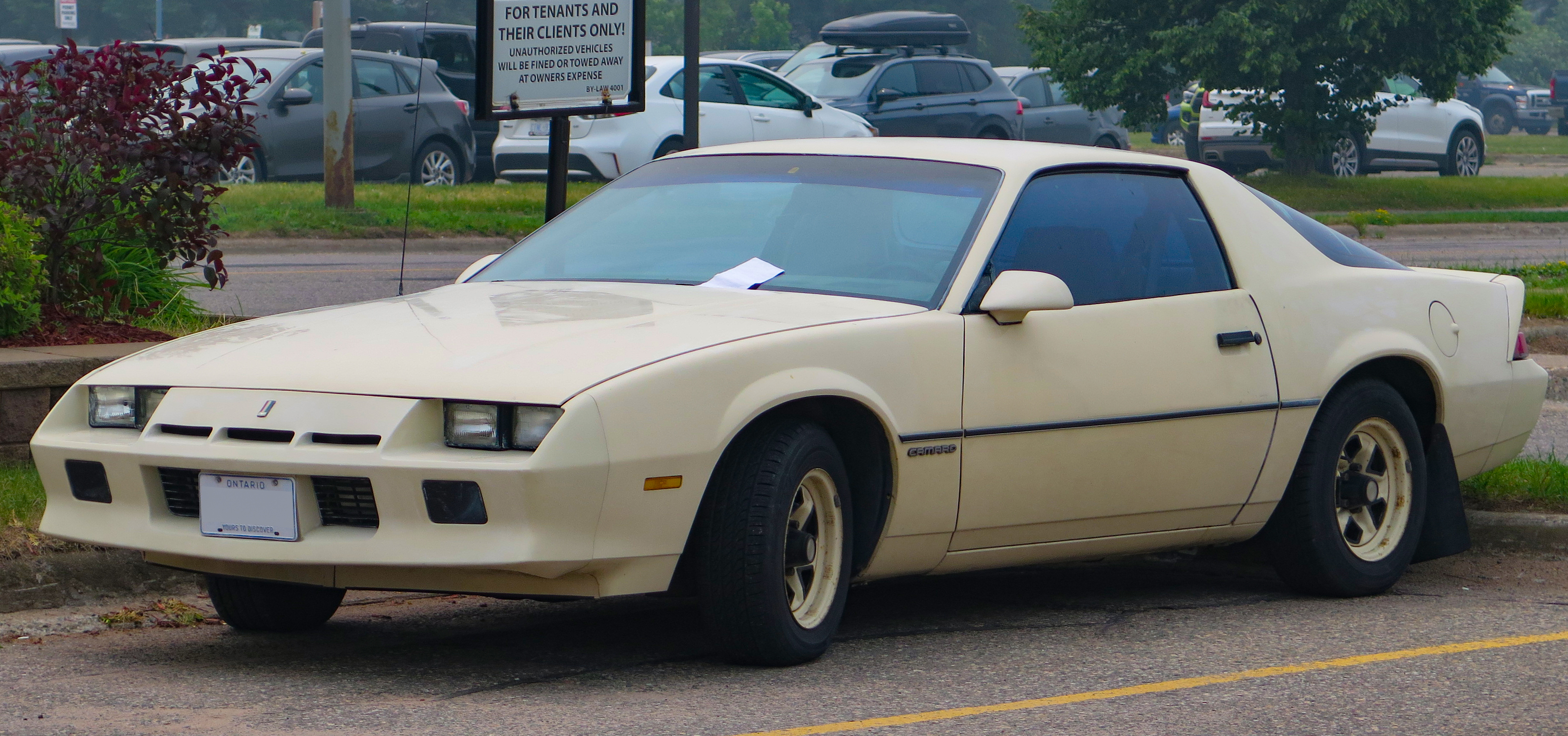
1984 Chevrolet Camaro Sport Coupe (base model)

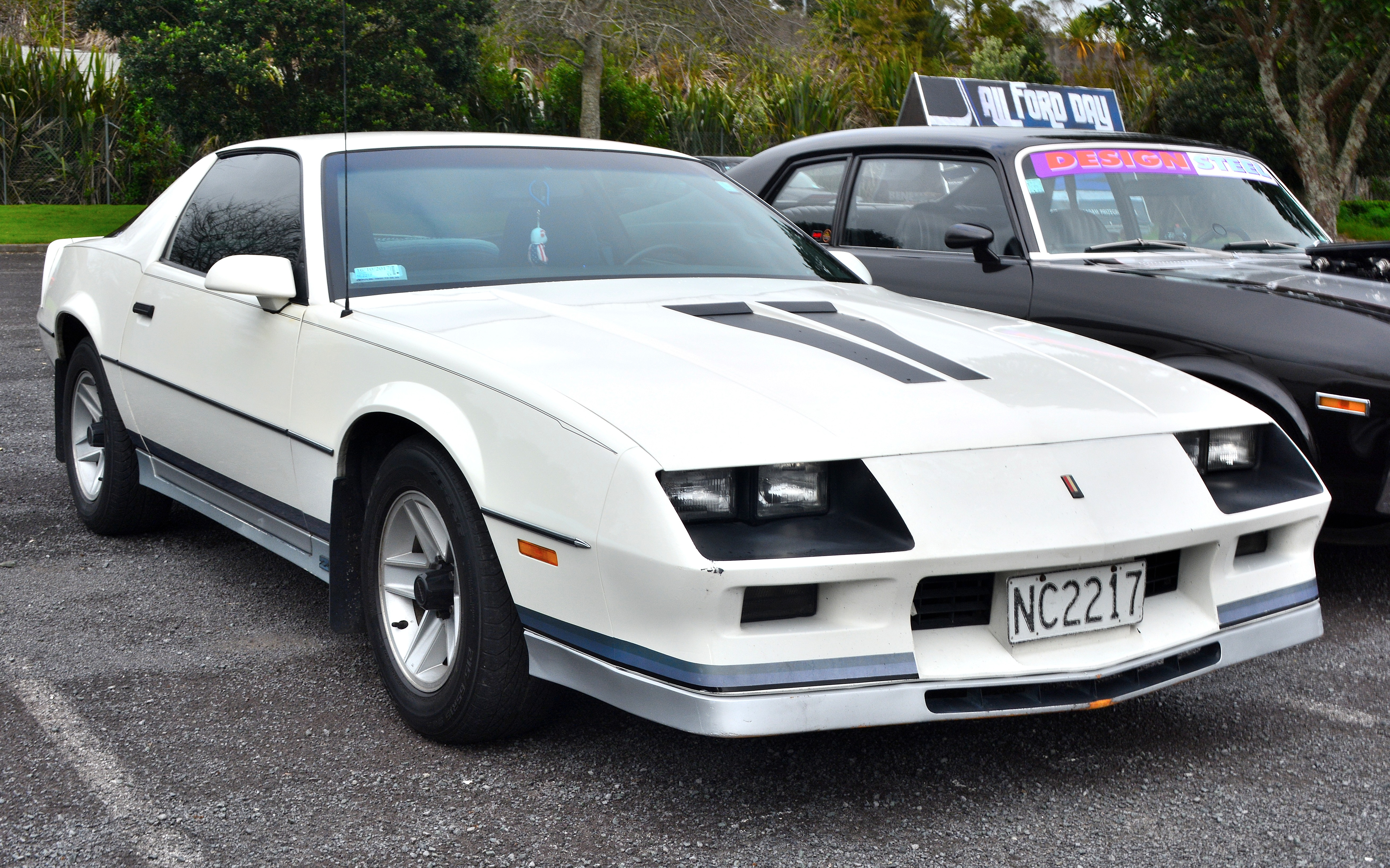
1984 Camaro Z28

The dashboard pad on all models received a revised shape and finish. In the Berlinetta, the standard instrument cluster was replaced by electronic readouts, including a bar-graph tachometer and digital speedometer. The new dash came with an overhead console and pod-mounted controls for turn signals, cruise-control, HVAC, windshield wiper, and headlights. The radio was mounted inside a pod on the console that could swivel toward the driver or passenger.

Drivetrain changes included the discontinuation of the LU5 305 Cross Fire V8, and the addition of a hydraulic clutch linkage on manual transmission cars. The L69 H.O. Z28 became available with an automatic transmission for the first time.

The Z28's body and features remained mostly unchanged, except the fiberglass SMC hood was replaced with a steel version.

Road & Track selected the 1984 Camaro/Firebird as one of twelve best cars in the world and in the Best Sports GT category in the $11,000 to $14,000 range. Car and Driver picked the 1984 Camaro Z28 as the best handling car built in the United States.

== 1985 ==
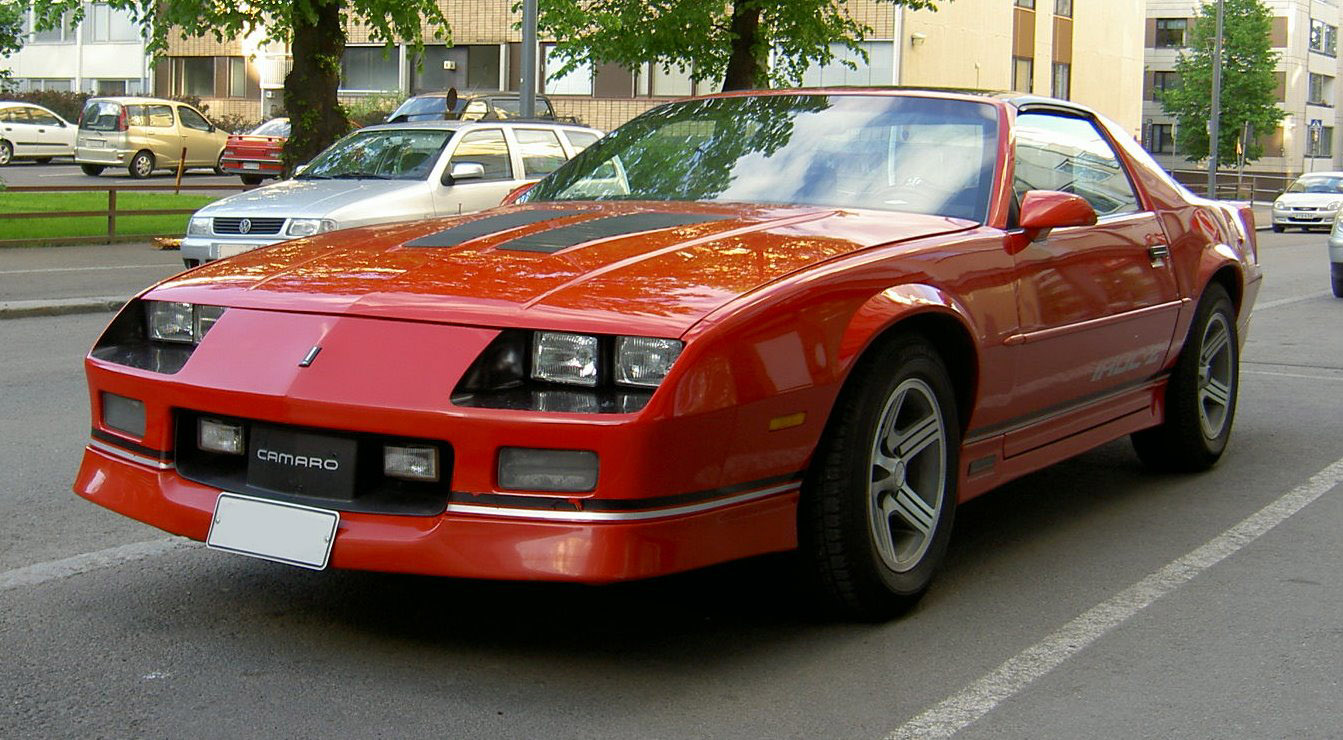
Camaro IROC-Z

For 1985, Chevrolet introduced the IROC-Z version that was named after the International Race of Champions. Offered as an option package on the Z28, the Camaro IROC-Z featured an upgraded suspension, lowered ride height, specially valved Delco-Bilstein shocks, larger diameter sway bars, a steering/frame brace known as the "wonder bar", a special decal package, and an optional Tuned Port Injection system taken from the Chevrolet Corvette. It also shared the Corvette's Goodyear "Gatorback" unidirectional tires in a 245/50/VR16 size vs. the Corvette's 255/50/VR16 size, and received unique new aluminum 5-spoke 16-by-8-inch wheels. The new wheels were designed with different offsets front and rear, resulting in the words "Front" or "Rear" cast into the wheels to distinguish which wheel went where.

The Camaro IROC-Z was on Car and Driver magazine's Ten Best list for 1985. The 305 c.i. 5.0-liter TPI LB9 was rated at 215 hp (160 kW), with the 4-bbl 305 LG4 at 155 hp, and the 4-bbl High Output 305 L69 at 190 hp (142 kW). A total of 2,497 L69 IROC-Z models were made for 1985. The LB9 was available only on the Z28 and the IROC-Z model with the TH700-R4 automatic transmission. A total of 205 IROC-Zs equipped with the LB9 305 with the G92 (Performance Axle Ratio) option were made in 1985. The G92 option upgraded the rear axle gear ratio from 3.23 to 3.42.

Also new for 1985, all Camaros featured refreshed noses, and new deeper valances and front spoiler for the Z28 and the newly introduced IROC-Z. The speedometers no longer had the unique double-pointed needle that simultaneously read mph and km/h: they were replaced by conventional single-pointer 85 mph (137 km/h) units.

For 1985 a (1C5) RPO California IROC-Z was also made, Chevrolet's California Marketing Group came up with the idea and it was for sale in California only. A total of 250 black and 250 red examples were produced. They were all equipped with the 5.0 TPI LB9 engine and TH700-R4 automatic transmission. All came equipped with the IROC-Z fog lights, wheels and ground effects, but with the base Camaro's hood (no louvers), rear decklid (no spoiler), and no exterior decals.

In its final iteration, the Z28-E was released in very limited quantities for 1984 and 1985. T-Tops were not available to emphasize its sporty image, and more comfort and handling options than ever were standard. As per the sales brochure for the Z28-E, you had disc brakes, shorter steering, shorter rear axle, even limited slip all as standard. Again the Z28-E carried the 'No Cat' specification for export markets, indicating open exhausts without catalytic convertors or other smog equipment. This Japanese commercial places again a standard US Z28 on the screen (no actual Z28-E available) and mentions similar footage related to the IROC-Z: Specially modified for I.R.O.C.

== 1986 ==
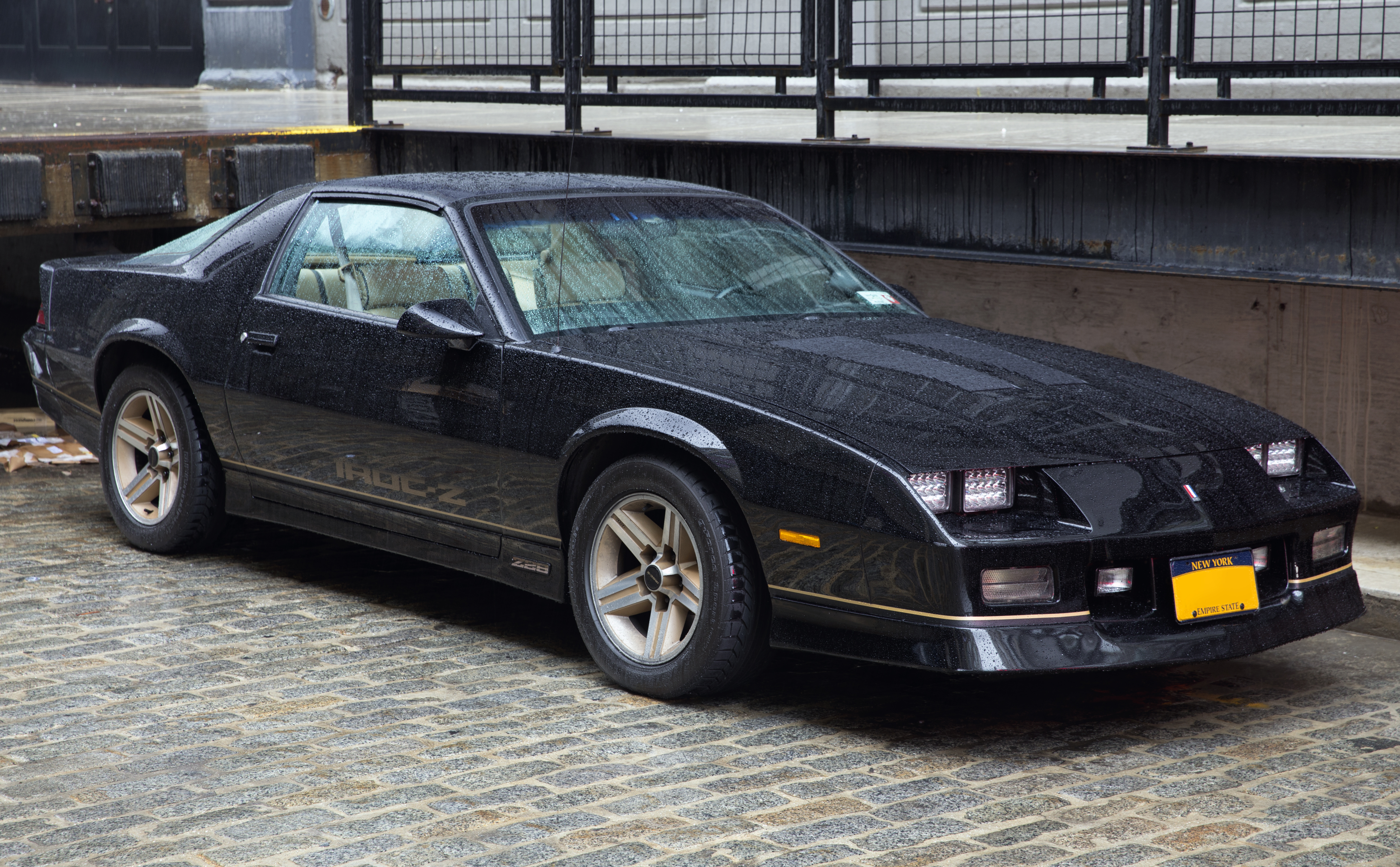
1986 Chevrolet Camaro IROC-Z

A newly required Center High Mounted Stop Lamp (CHMSL) was installed on the Camaro. 1986 was the only year to see this attached to the outside hatchback glass on base model Sport Coupes, Z28s, and IROC-Zs except for 1987 base models that did not have a spoiler. This was the final year for the L69 5.0 305 HO 4-bbl option, of which 63 were built for racing in Canada's Player's series and 11 for public sale, making a total of 74. The 2.8 L V6 was now the standard engine in the base model, replacing the 2.5 L I-4 model. The 305 TPI LB9 horsepower rating dropped from 215 hp (160 kW) to 190 hp (142 kW) in the IROC-Z models. All V8 engines received a new one-piece rear main seal. Braking performance was 139 feet from 60 mph. 1986 would be the final year for the Berlinetta trim level.

== 1987 ==
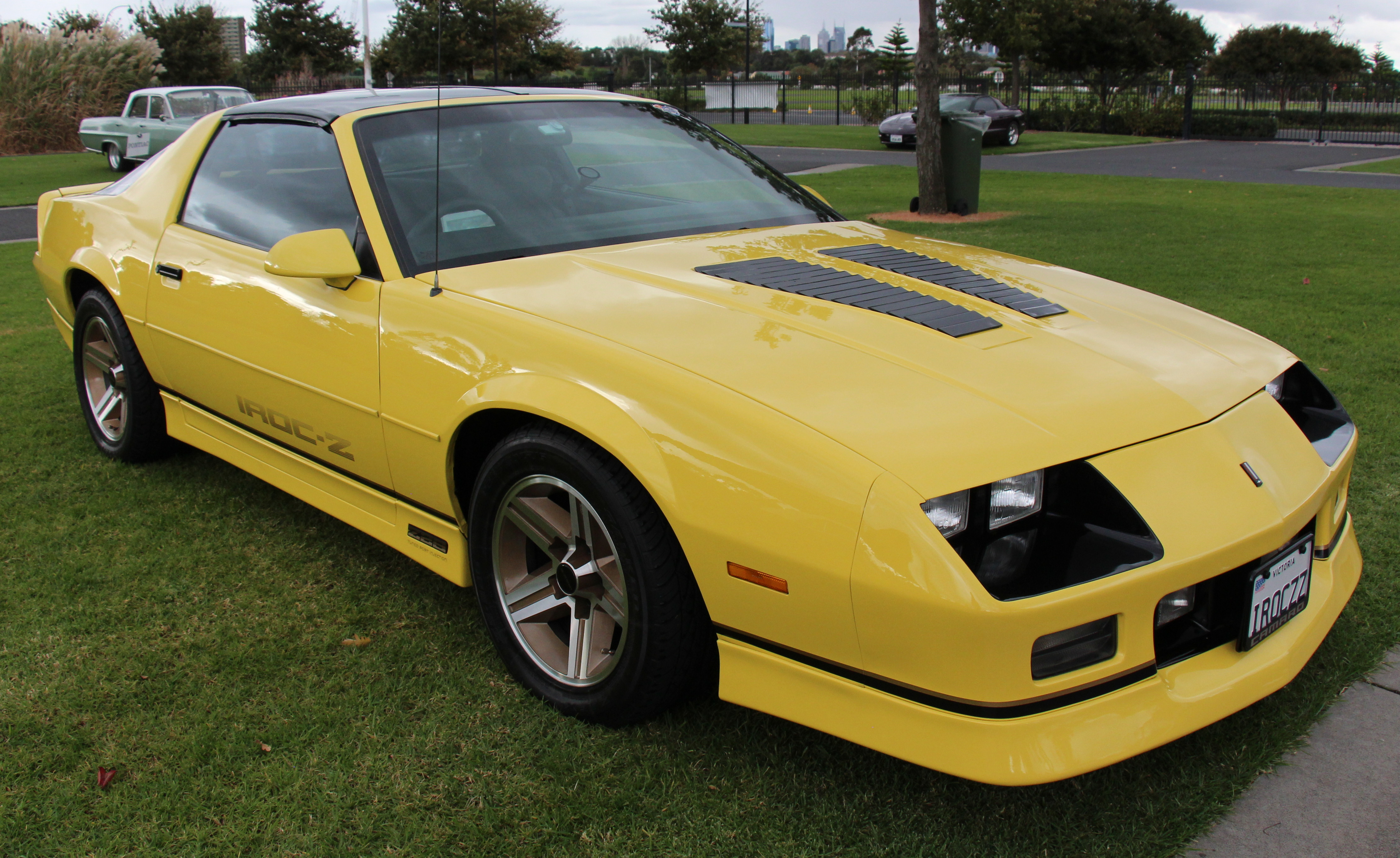
1987 Chevrolet Camaro IROC-Z

The 350 TPI engine with automatic and 305 TPI with 5-speed manual transmission were available for the first time in the IROC-Z. The new 350 (RPO code L98) was available only in the IROC-Z with an automatic transmission. The TPI 350 motor was visually distinguishable from the TPI 305 as the bumper cover decal had "5.7L" added to the "Tuned Port Injection" decal. It can also be determined by checking the VIN (8th character, F=305, 8=350). The 305 TPI equipped with automatic transmission came with 190 hp, while the Manual 305 TPI got a 215 hp (160 kW) rating. The 350 L98 gave a boost to 225 hp at 4,400 RPM and 330ftlb at 2,800 RPM. All V8 engines received hydraulic roller lifters and a new valve cover/head design. Valve covers featured new sealing and center bolts in the valve covers. Heads featured a new raised lip for improved valve cover sealing and the two center intake bolts were changed from 90-degree orientation to 72 degrees. G92 and L98 cars got the Borg-Warner HD 7.75-inch (197 mm) four-pinion rear end, produced for GM's Holden of Australia (Firebird WS6 cars went to this unit in 1986). These units can be identified by their 9-bolt (rather than 10) differential cover that has a rubber drain plug. The Borg-Warner logo is also cast into the bottom of the differential case. This rear axle came with tapered rather than straight roller bearings and a cone-clutch rather than disc-clutch limited-slip unit. These units came painted black from the factory while most others were bare metal. All 1987 350 TPI L98 IROC-Zs required 3.27 gears, J65 rear disc brakes, G80 limited-slip differential, and a KC4 engine oil cooler.

The largest visual change this year was the CHMSL (third brake light) was now mounted inside the rear spoiler instead of on top of the rear hatch (except the base coupe without the spoiler option - on those cars it remained on top of the hatch like the previous year). The Berlinetta was no longer available this year, replaced with a new LT model, while the base Camaro and Z28 continued as before. 145 mph (233 km/h) speedometers became standard in the IROC-Zs and Z28s with tuned port injected engines while the carbureted Camaro models and 2.8 liter V6 retained the 85 m.p.h. speedometer.

Other changes included a Camaro convertible that was introduced for the first time since 1969 as a regular production option. Available on the Sport Coupe, LT and IROC-Z, the conversion was performed on T-top equipped Camaros by American Sunroof Company (ASC). A total of 1,007 were produced in the first year of production. The 1987 model year marked the 20th anniversary of the Camaro and the convertibles were considered the anniversary editions and included a dash badge that read "20th Anniversary Commemorative Edition". Some 1987 T-Top models were made into convertibles by ASC after the customer took delivery. This is why there are some convertibles with the body VIN code of 2, meaning they were coupes, not convertibles (which have a body VIN code of 3). This was also the last year of production at GM's Norwood, Ohio, facility as sales continued to decline consolidating Camaro assembly to the Van Nuys factory located in Southern California.

== 1988 ==
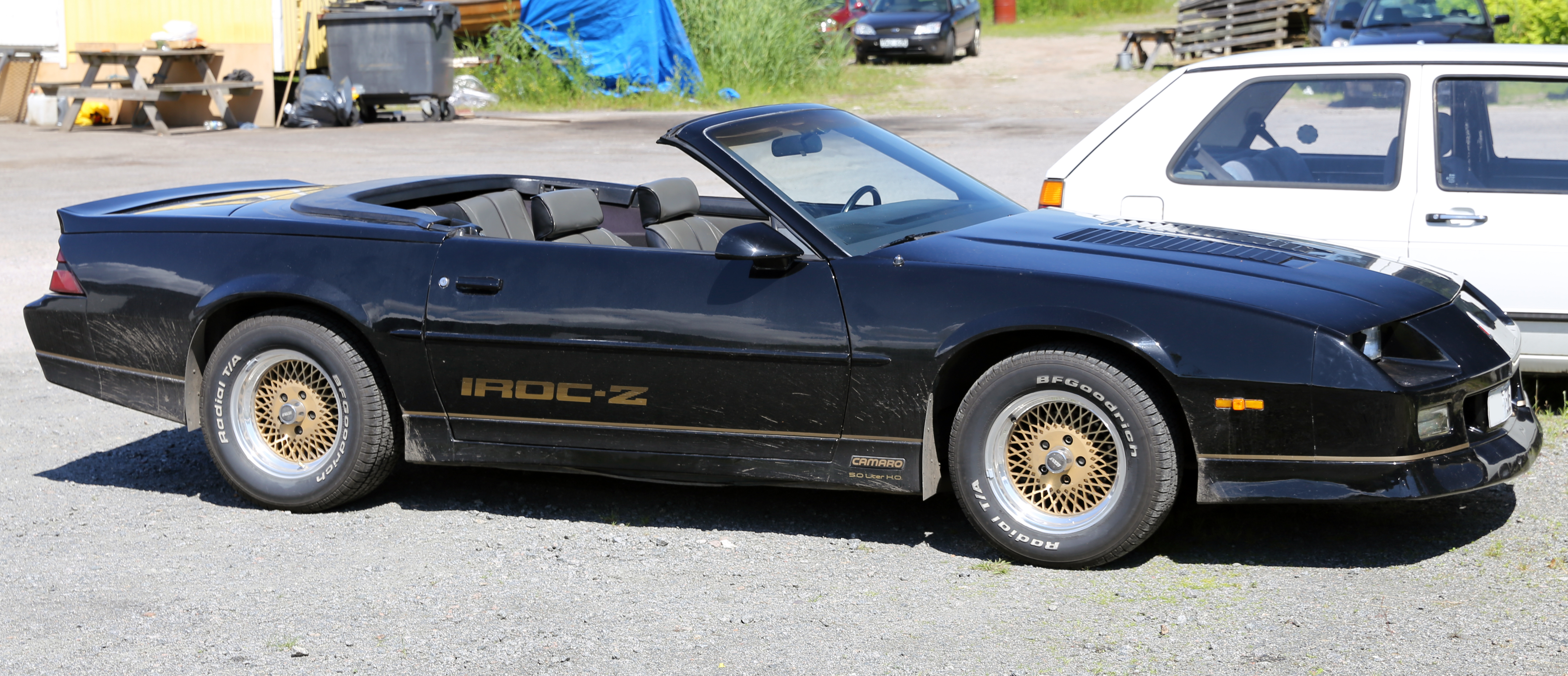
1988 Camaro IROC-Z convertible

The Camaro line was greatly simplified for the 1988 model year, starting with discontinuing the slow-selling LT model, and dropping the base Z28. The IROC-Z package proved popular and the package became standard on Z28s. This resulted in two models remaining, the base coupe and the IROC-Z. Without the Z28 to bridge the gap between the base Camaro and the flagship IROC-Z, the previously standard aluminum 16-inch 5-spoke wheels were now an option - "base" IROCs now got the previous year Z28's aluminum 15-inch 5-spoke wheels (which also became standard on the base coupes) and P215/65-15 tires. Also, the old Z28's ground effects and spoilers were now standard on the base Camaro coupes. Base models received a new raised spoiler for the first half production year.

All engines were fuel-injected this year; the 2.8 (173) running 135 HP at 4,900 rpm and 160 lb.ft at 3,900 rpm, the 5.0L 305 cid V8 gained throttle body injection, bringing net horsepower to 170; the 305 cid TPI manual transmission models were rated at 220 HP at 4,400 rpm and 290 lb.ft at 3,200 rpm, Automatic at 195 HP at 4,000 rpm and 290 lb.ft at 2,800 rpm and the 350 cid TPI got a small increase to 230 HP at 4,400 rpm and 330 lb.ft at 3,200 rpm. G92 (performance axle ratio) available only on IROC-Z with 5.0 TPI (LB9). All 1987 350 TPI L98 IROC-Zs came standard with the 3.27 BW rear end and everything that was included with G92 but did not have the G92 RPO code because it was not mandatory; this changed in 1988 however when a 2.77 rear was standard and G92 had to be specified to get the 3.27 differential. The IROC-Z was also treated to some small cosmetic changes. The "Z28" logos on the ground effects below the doors and on the rear bumper changed to read "IROC-Z". The large IROC-Z call-outs on the door moved from the front of the doors to the back, to put some space between the logos. Option code DX3 offered buyers the option of deleting the IROC-Z's door decals and stripes for a $60.00 credit. Optional 16-inch aluminum wheels were redesigned with two lines instead of one large line in each spoke, and center caps backgrounds changed from black to silver. Dash badges on the IROC still read "Z28" on top and "IROC-Z" below. The VIN code 8 is the engine code for a real TPI 5.7L IROC.

== 1989 ==
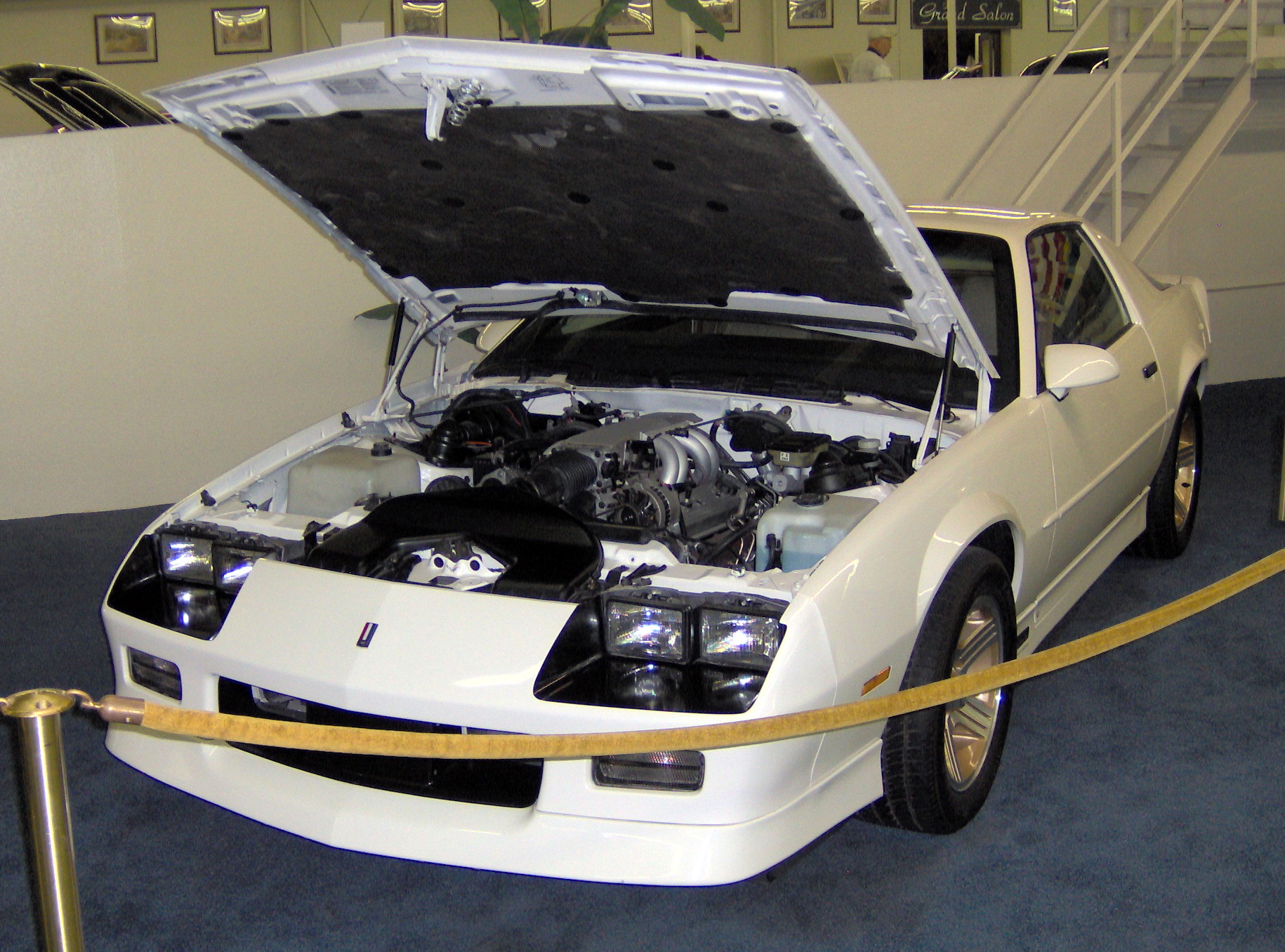
1989 Camaro Z28 IROC 1LE

The 1989 model year signified the return of the RS designation (last used in 1987 on a limited-edition California only model). The Rally Sport was now the base model featuring body ground effects mimicking the IROC and the previous Z28 but with the 2.8 V6 fuel-injected engine as standard with the 305 as an option. The raised rear spoiler that became available in 1988 on the base coupes was short-lived and done away with for this year. The engine ratings carried over from '88 with the addition of IROC-Z Coupes had a new dual catalytic converter exhaust option N10 that was standard with the G92 option only available on the 305 TPI motor with a manual transmission and the 350 TPI only available with the TH700-R4 automatic. 1989 was also the last year any third-gen with the B2L RPO 350 TPI L98 engine could be ordered in combination with the CC1 RPO removable T-Top roof panels.

Power ratings also varied in the 305 from 170 hp (standard RPO L03) to 230 hp (RPO LB9 with manual transmission and RPO N10 dual catalytic converter exhaust) and a boost to 240 hp for the 350 with RPO N10 respectively.

IROC-Zs with the TPI 350 had the 2.77 rear axle ratio as in the previous year, but the optional RPO G92 Performance Axle package modified the ratio to 3.27 for the TPI 350, and 3.45 for the TPI 305 with manual transmission. RPO G92 also included the aforementioned dual-converter exhaust; 4-wheel disc brakes (RPO J65); engine oil cooler; P245/50ZR16 Goodyear Eagle unidirectional tires; a 145 mph (233 km/h) speedometer; and a tachometer with a 5,500 rpm redline. A total of 1,426 IROC-Z coupes were equipped with the Performance Axle package in 1989.

To take an IROC-Z coupe to the maximum performance extreme in 1989, when the G92 Performance Axle was ordered with no air conditioning (C41), RPO code 1LE was automatically triggered. This included extra equipment intended to make the IROC-Z more competitive in SCCA Showroom Stock road racing events: larger 11.65-inch (296 mm) rotors with 2-piston aluminum calipers from PBR; an aluminum driveshaft; a special baffled fuel tank; specific shock absorbers; and stiffer suspension bushings. The fog lamps were also deleted. The 1LE was simply an option combination, not a separate package or model that dealers were aware of the existence of, resulting in 111 cars built with 1LE equipment in 1989.

== 1990 ==
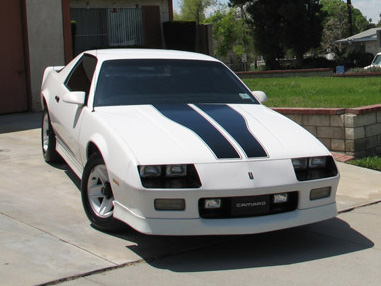
1990 Camaro RS

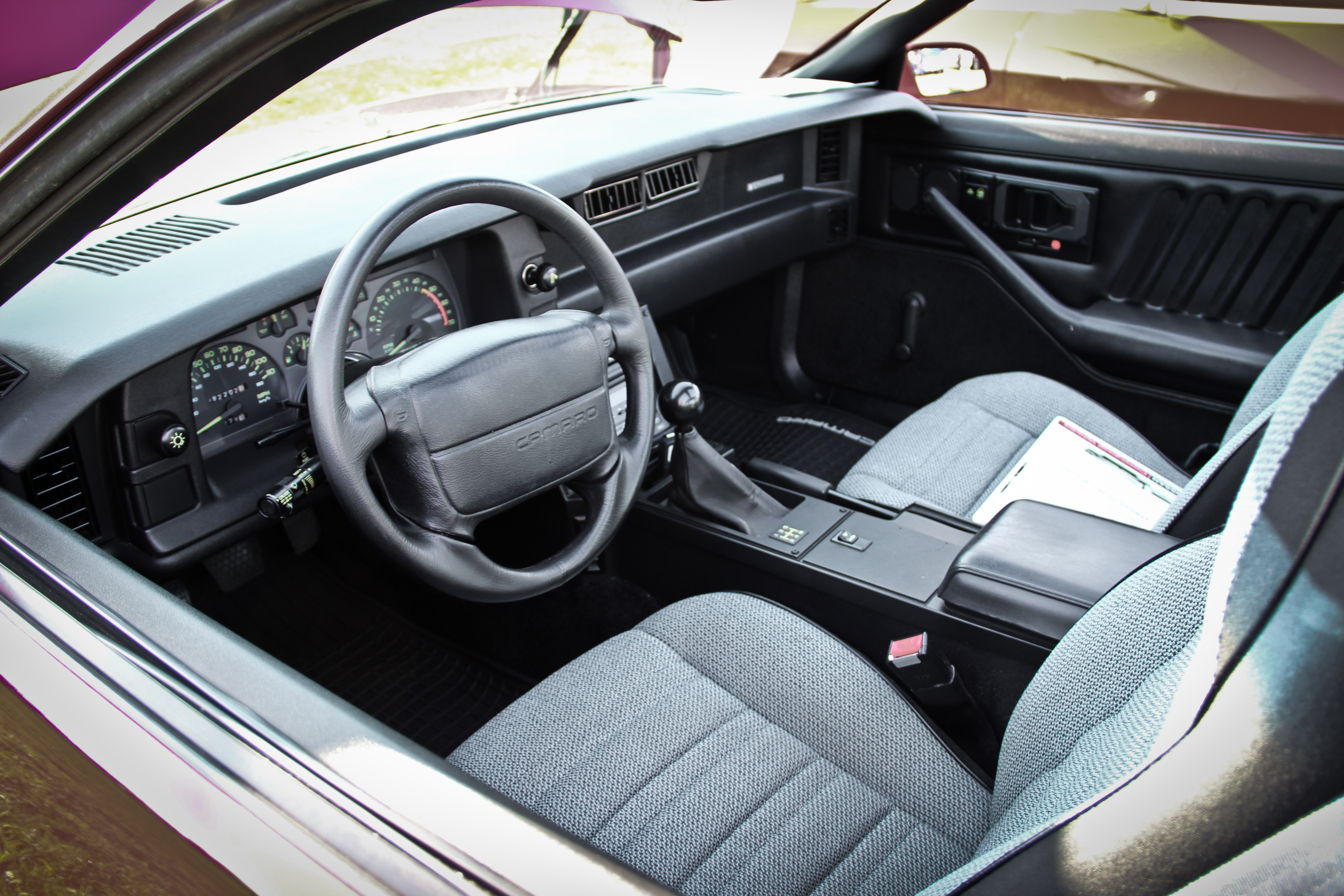
1990 Camaro RS interior

The 1990 model year finished the lowest production to date (35,048), due to a truncated 1990 model run followed by the early introduction of the facelifted 1991 models. 1990 also marked the final year for the IROC-Z; Chevrolet had decided not to renew its contract with the International Race of Champions.

This year was the first year for an airbag to be offered in any F-body. The new airbag came along with a new "half-moon" gauge cluster, that was offered only in 1990–1992 Camaros. The sharp edges on the dash surfaces were rounded and the lettering on gauges switched to yellow from white. 1990 was a distinguishable model year as it was the only third-generation Camaro that did not feature the updated ground effects of the 1991–1992 models but did have the newer interior/dash features. The 2.8 L V6 was upgraded to the 3.1 L V6.

The RPO code 1LE was again available in 1990, triggered as in the previous year by RPO G92 Performance Axle combined with no air conditioning on the IROC-Z coupe. Only 62 Camaros were built with 1LE equipment in 1990.

The last 1990 Camaro rolled off the line on December 31, 1989.

Camaros in IROC-Z trim that were equipped with the 5.7 TPI motor received a slight horsepower increase to 245 at 4,400 rpm and torque numbers also rose to 345 at 3,200 rpm.

== 1991 ==
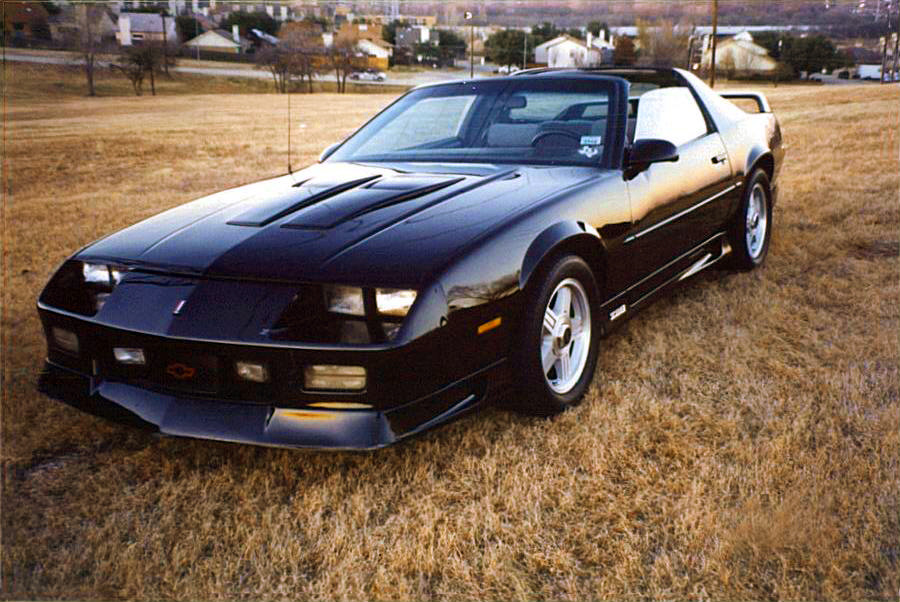
1991 Chevrolet Camaro Z28

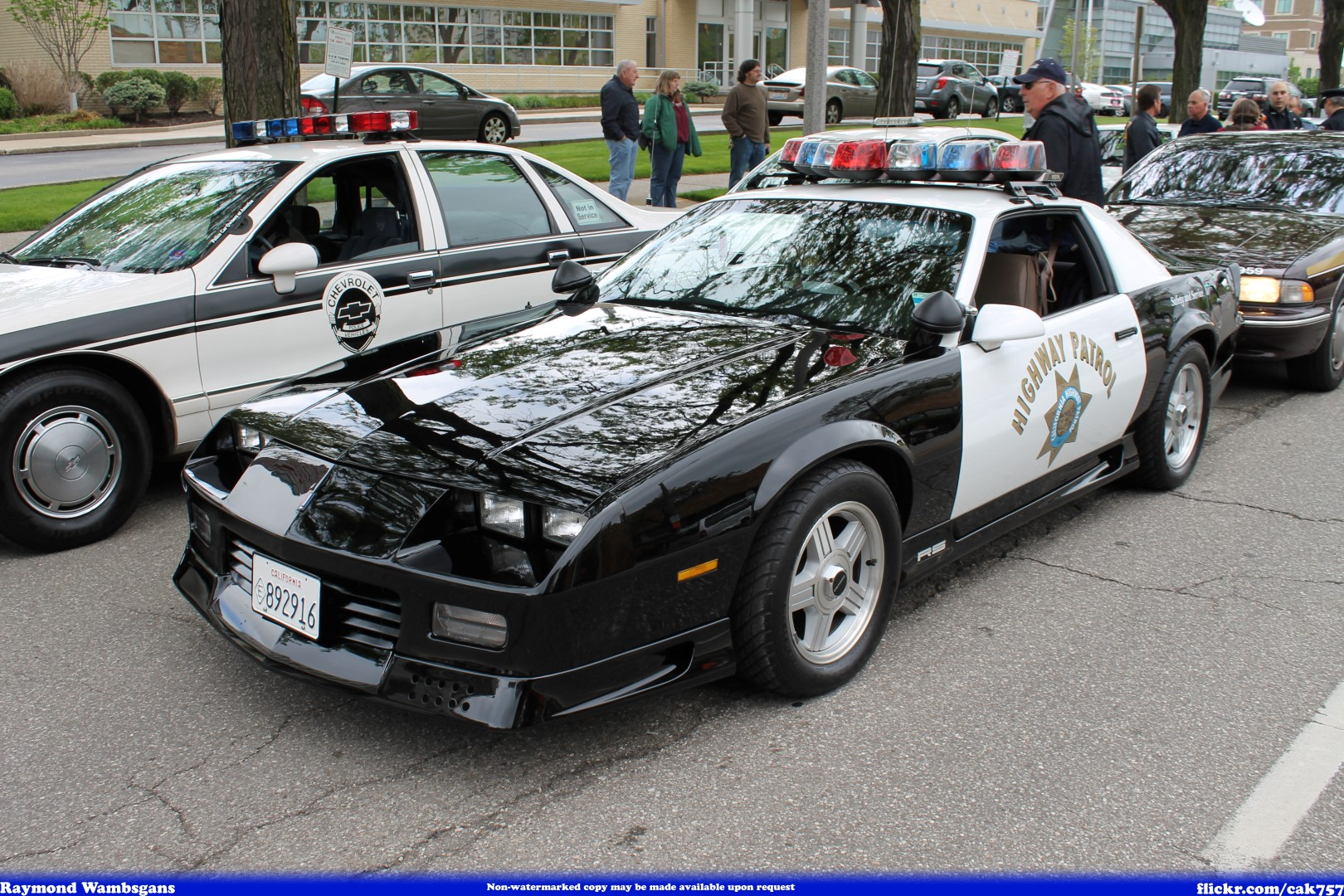
Camaro B4C of the California Highway Patrol

Production for the 1991 Camaro started in February 1990. Big changes occurred, as all Camaros received a facelift in the form of a ground effects package for not only RS but also the Z28 models, while the IROC-Z was no longer offered. The Z28 also featured a high-rise spoiler and non-functional hood "blisters". The CHMSL was relocated from the spoiler to the top of the Hatch again like the 1986 models, except the housing was now on the inside rather than the outside of the hatch. The Convertible still retained the spoiler-mounted third brake light. The 1991 Z28 also received a new wheel design to accent the new body. The B4C "Special Service" option was made available to law enforcement, the government, and military agencies. The B4C amounted to little more than a Z28 powertrain and suspension in the RS. (Car Craft Magazine refers to the B4C as a 1LE equipped with air conditioning; although this is slightly erroneous because in 1991, the large brakes with PBR calipers from the 1LE package were not included with B4C.) Just under 600 B4C Camaros were sold for 1991. Power ratings on the 350 TPI were as follows; 245 hp (183 kW) at 4,400 rpm and 345 lb⋅ft (468 N⋅m) at 3,200 rpm. Power rating on the 305 TPI motor were as follows; 230 hp (172 kW) at 4,200 rpm and 300 lb⋅ft (407 N⋅m) at 3,200 rpm. Power rating on the 305 TBI stayed same at 170 hp(127 kW) at 4,000 rpm and 255 lb⋅ft (346 N⋅m) at 2,400 rpm. Rumors say that these numbers were slightly underrated by GM, but this has not been investigated.

Beginning with the 1991 model year, GM pioneered some modified assembly techniques with the F-body Camaro and Firebird which were carried forward into the fourth generation. Different seam sealers, structural adhesives, and body assembly techniques were employed in key areas in an effort to reduce squeaks and rattles and improve the perception of quality.

The SCCA Showroom-Stock-ready 1LE package continued with similar equipment to previous years and was again triggered automatically by the G92 Performance Axle option combined with the C41 basic ventilation system (no air conditioning) on the Z28 coupe. Production of the 1LE increased to 478 units.

== 1992 ==
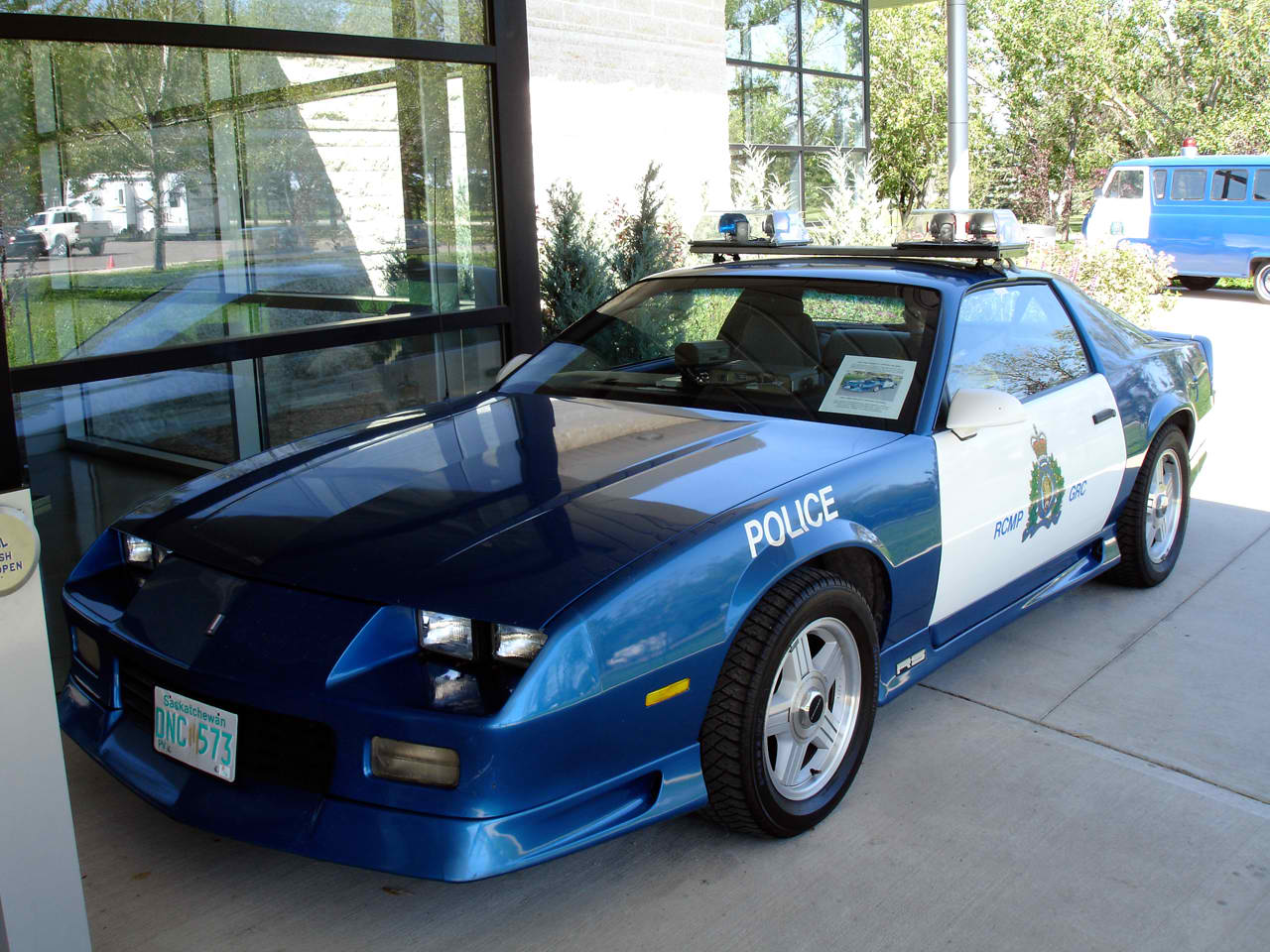
A 1992 Chevrolet Camaro as used by the Royal Canadian Mounted Police in the 1990s, outfitted in a white and blue paint finish with emergency lights on the roof

1992 was the final year of the third-generation Camaro. A "25th Anniversary Heritage Edition" option had been planned with Corvette aluminum cylinder heads, tubular exhaust headers, and 6-speed manual transmission, but this was scrapped in favor of a "Heritage Package" option (RPO Z03) which was only a graphics package of badges and rally stripes. All 1992 Camaros received a "25th Anniversary" badge on the dashboard. The 1992 version of the Camaro B4C (Special Service Package) got the addition of 1LE brakes. A total of 589 B4Cs were sold. The B4C option was also deemed popular enough to be carried on to the fourth-generation model.

Some TPI 1992 Camaros received some of the "leftovers" from its Corvette cousin, which switched from Tuned Port Injection to the new LT1 engine series in 1992. They received the rough texture, cast aluminum style, intake runners from the TPI Corvette instead of the regular Camaro smooth tube ones. In some cases, they were built with black painted valve covers instead of the normal silver valve covers. Some also received a blank throttle body plate, like the LT1, instead of the normal plate with "Tuned Port Injection" script. The change was purely cosmetic, performance remained identical to the previous year.

The RPO 1LE option combination, identical to the previous year in specification and option requirements, had its highest production year of the third generation Camaro, with 705 cars so equipped. As mentioned, the 1LE brakes were included with B4C in 1992, accounting for 589 of the 705 built. This means that only 116 "true" 1LE-only cars (A/C delete, non-Special Service Package) were built for the year.

The vast majority of the 1LE cars built during the 1989-1992 period were very sparsely equipped vehicles. Since they were intended for racing, where extra weight is a disadvantage and interiors are often gutted after purchase, most were very lightly optioned. The majority of 1LE Camaros had the base interior, with no power options, cruise control, or even floor mats. Some were even built without radios (201 cars were built as "radio delete" in 1992).

This was also the last year of production of the Camaro at the assembly plant in Van Nuys, California (and the United States as a whole until 2015). The last third-generation Camaro produced was a red Z28 coupe on August 27, 1992, that features signatures of the assembly line workers.

== Engines ==
Engine design	Engine family	Production	RPO Code	Power	Torque	Notes
2.5 L (151 cu in) I4	Iron Duke I4 engine	1982	LQ9	90 hp (67 kW) @ 4,000 RPM	132 lb⋅ft (179 N⋅m) @ 2,800 RPM	
2.5 L (151 cu in) I4	Iron Duke I4 engine	1983–1984	LQ9	92 hp (69 kW) @ 4,000 RPM	134 lb⋅ft (182 N⋅m) @ 2,800 RPM	
2.5 L (151 cu in) I4	Iron Duke I4 engine	1985	LQ9	88 hp (66 kW) @ 4,400 RPM	132 lb⋅ft (179 N⋅m) @ 2,800 RPM	
2.5 L (151 cu in) I4	Iron Duke I4 engine	1986	LQ9	88 hp (66 kW) @ 4,400 RPM	130 lb⋅ft (180 N⋅m) @ 2,800 RPM	
2.8 L (173 cu in) V6	General Motors 60° V6 engine	1982	LC1	102 hp (76 kW) @ 4,800 RPM	142 lb⋅ft (193 N⋅m) @ 2,400 RPM	
2.8 L (173 cu in) V6	General Motors 60° V6 engine	1983–1984	LC1	107 hp (80 kW) @ 4,800 RPM	145 lb⋅ft (197 N⋅m) @ 2,100 RPM	
2.8 L (173 cu in) V6	General Motors 60° V6 engine	1985	LB8	135 hp (101 kW) @ 5,100 RPM	165 lb⋅ft (224 N⋅m) @ 3,600 RPM	
2.8 L (173 cu in) V6	General Motors 60° V6 engine	1986	LB8	135 hp (101 kW) @ 5,100 RPM	160 lb⋅ft (220 N⋅m) @ 3,900 RPM	
2.8 L (173 cu in) V6	General Motors 60° V6 engine	1987–1989	LB8	135 hp (101 kW) @ 4,900 RPM	160 lb⋅ft (220 N⋅m) @ 3,900 RPM	
3.1 L (191 cu in) V6	General Motors 60° V6 engine	1990–1991	LH0	140 hp (104 kW) @ 4,400 RPM	180 lb⋅ft (240 N⋅m) @ 3,600 RPM	
3.1 L (191 cu in) V6	General Motors 60° V6 engine	1992	LH0	140 hp (104 kW) @ 4,400 RPM	180 lb⋅ft (240 N⋅m) @ 3,200 RPM	
5.0 L (305 cu in) V8	Chevrolet small-block V8 engine	1982	LG4	145 hp (108 kW) @ 4,000 RPM	240 lb⋅ft (330 N⋅m) @ 2,000 RPM	
5.0 L (305 cu in) V8	Chevrolet small-block V8 engine	1983–1984	LG4	150 hp (112 kW) @ 4,000 RPM	240 lb⋅ft (330 N⋅m) @ 2,400 RPM	
5.0 L (305 cu in) V8	Chevrolet small-block V8 engine	1985	LG4	155 hp (116 kW) @ 4,200 RPM	245 lb⋅ft (332 N⋅m) @ 2,000 RPM	
5.0 L (305 cu in) V8	Chevrolet small-block V8 engine	1986	LG4	155 hp (116 kW) @ 4,200 RPM	245 lb⋅ft (332 N⋅m) @ 2,000 RPM	Base
5.0 L (305 cu in) V8	Chevrolet small-block V8 engine	1986	LG4	165 hp (123 kW) @ 4,400 RPM	250 lb⋅ft (340 N⋅m) @ 2,000 RPM	Z28
5.0 L (305 cu in) V8	Chevrolet small-block V8 engine	1987	LG4	165 hp (123 kW) @ 4,400 RPM	245 lb⋅ft (332 N⋅m) @ 2,800 RPM	
5.0 L (305 cu in) V8	Chevrolet small-block V8 engine	1988	L03	170 hp (127 kW) @ 4,000 RPM	255 lb⋅ft (346 N⋅m) @ 2,400 RPM	
5.0 L (305 cu in) V8	Chevrolet small-block V8 engine	1989	L03	170 hp (127 kW) @ 4,400 RPM	255 lb⋅ft (346 N⋅m) @ 2,400 RPM	
5.0 L (305 cu in) V8	Chevrolet small-block V8 engine	1990–1992	L03	170 hp (127 kW) @ 4,000 RPM	255 lb⋅ft (346 N⋅m) @ 2,400 RPM	
5.0 L (305 cu in) V8	Chevrolet small-block V8 engine	1982	LU5	165 hp (123 kW) @ 4,200 RPM	240 lb⋅ft (330 N⋅m) @ 2,400 RPM	
5.0 L (305 cu in) V8	Chevrolet small-block V8 engine	1983	LU5	175 hp (130 kW) @ 4,200 RPM	250 lb⋅ft (340 N⋅m) @ 2,500 RPM	
5.0 L (305 cu in) V8	Chevrolet small-block V8 engine	1983–1986	L69	190 hp (142 kW) @ 4,800 RPM	240 lb⋅ft (330 N⋅m) @ 3,200 RPM	
5.0 L (305 cu in) V8	Chevrolet small-block V8 engine	1985	LB9	215 hp (160 kW) @ 4,400 RPM	275 lb⋅ft (373 N⋅m) @ 3,200 RPM	
5.0 L (305 cu in) V8	Chevrolet small-block V8 engine	1986	LB9	190 hp (142 kW) @ 4,000 RPM	285 lb⋅ft (386 N⋅m) @ 2,800 RPM	
5.0 L (305 cu in) V8	Chevrolet small-block V8 engine	1987	LB9	190 hp (142 kW) @ 4,000 RPM	295 lb⋅ft (400 N⋅m) @ 2,800 RPM	Automatic
5.0 L (305 cu in) V8	Chevrolet small-block V8 engine	1987	LB9	215 hp (160 kW) @ 4,000 RPM	295 lb⋅ft (400 N⋅m) @ 2,800 RPM	Manual
5.0 L (305 cu in) V8	Chevrolet small-block V8 engine	1988	LB9	195 hp (145 kW) @ 4,000 RPM	295 lb⋅ft (400 N⋅m) @ 2,800 RPM	Automatic
5.0 L (305 cu in) V8	Chevrolet small-block V8 engine	1988	LB9	220 hp (164 kW) @ 4,400 RPM	290 lb⋅ft (390 N⋅m) @ 3,200 RPM	Manual
5.0 L (305 cu in) V8	Chevrolet small-block V8 engine	1989	LB9	195 hp (145 kW) @ 4,000 RPM	295 lb⋅ft (400 N⋅m) @ 2,800 RPM	Automatic
5.0 L (305 cu in) V8	Chevrolet small-block V8 engine	1989	LB9	220 hp (164 kW) @ 4,400 RPM	290 lb⋅ft (390 N⋅m) @ 3,200 RPM	Manual, single-exhaust
5.0 L (305 cu in) V8	Chevrolet small-block V8 engine	1989	LB9	230 hp (172 kW) @ 4,600 RPM	300 lb⋅ft (410 N⋅m) @ 3,200 RPM	Manual, dual-exhaust
5.0 L (305 cu in) V8	Chevrolet small-block V8 engine	1990	LB9	210 hp (157 kW) @ 4,400 RPM	285 lb⋅ft (386 N⋅m) @ 3,200 RPM	Single-exhaust
5.0 L (305 cu in) V8	Chevrolet small-block V8 engine	1990	LB9	230 hp (172 kW) @ 4,400 RPM	300 lb⋅ft (410 N⋅m) @ 3,200 RPM	Dual-exhaust
5.0 L (305 cu in) V8	Chevrolet small-block V8 engine	1991	LB9	205 hp (153 kW) @ 4,200 RPM	285 lb⋅ft (386 N⋅m) @ 3,200 RPM	Single-exhaust
5.0 L (305 cu in) V8	Chevrolet small-block V8 engine	1991	LB9	230 hp (172 kW) @ 4,200 RPM	300 lb⋅ft (410 N⋅m) @ 3,200 RPM	Dual-exhaust
5.0 L (305 cu in) V8	Chevrolet small-block V8 engine	1992	LB9	205 hp (153 kW) @ 4,200 RPM	285 lb⋅ft (386 N⋅m) @ 3,200 RPM	Single-exhaust
5.0 L (305 cu in) V8	Chevrolet small-block V8 engine	1992	LB9	230 hp (172 kW) @ 4,400 RPM	300 lb⋅ft (410 N⋅m) @ 3,200 RPM	Dual-exhaust
5.7 L (350 cu in) V8	Chevrolet small-block V8 engine	1987	L98	225 hp (168 kW) @ 4,400 RPM	330 lb⋅ft (450 N⋅m) @ 2,800 RPM	
5.7 L (350 cu in) V8	Chevrolet small-block V8 engine	1988	L98	230 hp (172 kW) @ 4,400 RPM	330 lb⋅ft (450 N⋅m) @ 3,200 RPM	
5.7 L (350 cu in) V8	Chevrolet small-block V8 engine	1989	L98	230 hp (172 kW) @ 4,400 RPM	330 lb⋅ft (450 N⋅m) @ 3,200 RPM	2.77 final drive
5.7 L (350 cu in) V8	Chevrolet small-block V8 engine	1989	L98	240 hp (179 kW) @ 4,400 RPM	345 lb⋅ft (468 N⋅m) @ 3,200 RPM	3.27 final drive
5.7 L (350 cu in) V8	Chevrolet small-block V8 engine	1990–1992	L98	245 hp (183 kW) @ 4,400 RPM	345 lb⋅ft (468 N⋅m) @ 3,200 RPM	

== Production ==
Production Figures:

Chevrolet Camaro Production Figures
	Coupe	Berlinetta	Convertible	Yearly Total
1982	142,324	39,744	-	182,068
1983	125,906	27,925	-	153,831
1984	227,708	33,400	-	261,108
1985	166,165	13,649	-	179,814
1986	187,649	4,479	-	192,128
1987	136,753	-	1,007	137,760
1988	90,655	-	5,620	96,275
1989	103,554	-	7,185	110,739
1990	77,810	-	5,279	83,089
1991	92,306	-	8,532	100,838
1992	66,191	-	3,816	70,007
Total	1,417,021	119,197	31,439	1,567,657
