= Rallye rim =

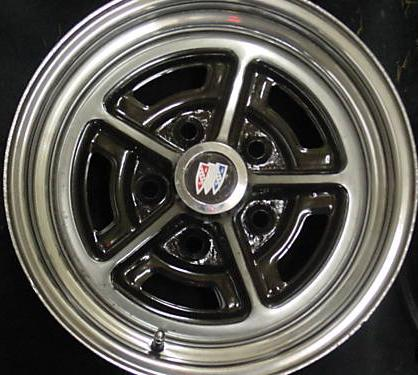
One type of Rallye rim built by Buick in the muscle car era.

A Rallye rim (or Rally wheel) is a term used in automotive design for optional race car inspired wheels. These wheels would have the appearance of the strong and lightweight wheels of a race car. Although less commonly used today the rallye rim was a popular option available in the muscle car era.
