= 1973 Can-Am season =

North American auto racing season

Seasons
- ← 1972 1974 →

The 1973 Canadian-American Challenge Cup was the eighth season of the Can-Am auto racing series. It consisted of FIA Group 7 racing cars running two-hour sprint events.

It began June 10, 1973, and ended October 28, 1973, after eight rounds. The season was dominated by two of the turbocharged Porsche 917/10 and then by the improved /30 version of Team Penske driven by Mark Donohue.

The last two races came amid the Oil Crisis, which ended interest in performance cars after an already-declining market over a several-year period. The golden age of the Trans Am Series had ended after the 1972 season, leaving Can Am and Formula 5000 as the frontrunners of the SCCA. The season was also the penultimate season of the CanAm series, which would fold after 1974 before being revived in an entirely reworked series based on F5000 a few years later.

== Schedule ==
For 1973, the schedule was altered as the season continued on, one reason being the Porsche dominance. The first race ran in a standard, single race format. Rounds two through four ran as two heats, with the results being determined by combined results. Rounds five through eight ran a Sprint qualifying heat first to determine the starting order for the Cup event. The results of the Sprint and Cup were not combined.

Rnd	Race	Circuit	Date
1	Labatt's Blue Trophy	Mosport Park	June 10
2	Carling Can-Am	Road Atlanta	July 8
3	Watkins Glen Can-Am	Watkins Glen International	July 22
4	Buckeye Cup	Mid-Ohio Sports Car Course	August 12
5	Road America Can-Am	Road America	August 26
6	Molson Cup	Edmonton Speedway Park	September 16
7	Monterey Castrol Grand Prix	Laguna Seca Raceway	October 14
8	Los Angeles Times Grand Prix	Riverside International Raceway	October 28

== Entries ==
Team	Chassis	Engine	Tire	Number	Drivers	Rounds
(United States) Vasek Polak Racing, Inc.	Porsche 917/10	Porsche 5.0 L Turbo Flat-12	G	0	(South Africa) Jody Scheckter	All
(United States) Vasek Polak Racing, Inc.	Porsche 917/10	Porsche 5.4 L Flat-12; Porsche 5.0 L Turbo Flat-12	G	3	(United States) Steve Durst	1–5
(United States) Vasek Polak Racing, Inc.	Porsche 917/10	Porsche 5.4 L Flat-12; Porsche 5.0 L Turbo Flat-12	G	3	(United Kingdom) Brian Redman	7–8
(United States) Wilson Racing	McLaren M8E	Chevrolet 7.6 L Turbo V8	G	2	(United States) Gary Wilson	4–5, 8
(Germany) Hans Wiedmer	Porsche 917/10	Porsche 5.0 L Turbo Flat-12	G	4	(Germany) Hans Wiedmer	1–4
(United States) William Cuddy	McLaren M8E	Chevrolet 7.6 L V8		4	(United States) Bill Cuddy	7
(Germany) Willi Kauhsen Racing	Porsche 917/10	Porsche 5.0 L Turbo Flat-12	G	5	(Germany) Willi Kauhsen	4
(United States) Roger Penske Racing Enterprises, Inc.	Porsche 917/30	Porsche 5.4 L Turbo Flat-12	G	6	(United States) Mark Donohue	All
(United States) U. S. Racing	McLaren M8F	Chevrolet 8.1 L V8	G	8	(United States) Scooter Patrick	All
(United States) William Overhauser Racing Team, Ltd.	McLaren M8D	Chevrolet 7.4 L V8; Chevrolet 7.6 L V8	G	9	(Canada) John Cordts	All
(United States) Motschenbacher Racing Enterprises	McLaren M8F	Chevrolet 8.1 L V8	G	11	(Canada) John Cannon	1, 3
(United States) Motschenbacher Racing Enterprises	McLaren M8F	Chevrolet 8.1 L V8	G	11	(Germany) Lothar Motschenbacher	2, 6
(United States) Motschenbacher Racing Enterprises	McLaren M8F	Chevrolet 8.1 L V8	G	11	(United Kingdom) Derek Bell	4–5
(United States) Motschenbacher Racing Enterprises	McLaren M8F	Chevrolet 8.1 L V8	G	11	(United States) Steve Durst	6–8
(United States) Warren Agor Racing Enterprises	McLaren M8FP	Chevrolet 8.1 L V8	G	13	(United States) Warren Agor	1–5
(United States) Artemis International, Ltd.	Ferrari 512 M	Ferrari 5.0 L V12	G	13	(United States) Sam Posey	8
(United States) Racing Specialties	Lola T260	Chevrolet 7.6 L V8	G	14/39	(United States) Tom Heyser	2–5
(United States) Racing Specialties	Lola T260	Chevrolet 7.6 L V8	G	14/39	(United States) John Gunn	6–8
(United States) William M. Wonder	McLaren M8C	Chevrolet 7.6 L V8	G	15	(United States) Bill Wonder	1
(United States) Rinzler Motoracing-Royal Crown	Porsche 917/10	Porsche 5.4 L Turbo Flat-12	G	16	(United States) George Follmer	All
(United States) Rinzler Motoracing-Royal Crown	Porsche 917/10	Porsche 5.4 L Turbo Flat-12	G	23	(United States) Charlie Kemp	1, 3–8
(United States) Nagel Racing	Lola T260	Chevrolet 8.1 L V8	G	17	(United States) Bob Nagel	All
(United States) Bailey Speed Shop	Lola T222	Chevrolet 7.6 L V8		18	(United States) Gene Fisher	2
(Germany) Müller Motors Corporation	KMW SP20	Porsche 2.6 L Flat-6	G	20	(United States) Bob Earl	8
(Germany) Müller Motors Corporation	KMW SP20	Porsche 2.6 L Flat-6	G	22	(Germany) Hans Müller-Perschl	7–8
(United States) Charles P. Semple	Lola T163	Chevrolet 7.0 L V8		27/77	(United States) Tony Settember	7–8
(United States) Midwest Racing	McLaren M12	Chevrolet 8.1 L V8	G	30	(United States) Frank Kahlich	1, 8
(United States) Otto Zipper Racing Team	Alfa Romeo T33/3	Alfa Romeo 3.0 L V8	G	33	(United States) Milt Minter	7–8
(United States) Burmester Racing	McLaren M8R	Chevrolet 7.4 L V8; Chevrolet 8.1 L V8	F	34	(United States) Tom Dutton	All
(Canada) Harry Bytzek	Porsche 908/02 K	Porsche 3.0 L Flat-8	F	39	(Canada) Harry Bytzek	1
(United States) Jim Butcher Racing	McLaren M8C	Chevrolet 7.4 L V8	G	41	(United States) Jim Butcher	1–2
(United States) Jim Butcher Racing	McLaren M8C	Chevrolet 7.4 L V8	G	41	(United States) Dick Durant	5
(Canada) Ennerdale Racing	Costello SP7; Costello SP8	Oldsmobile 4.4 L V8		45	(Canada) David Saville-Peck	1, 4–8
(United States) Blue Magic Corporation	McLaren M8E	Chevrolet 8.1 L V8	G	47	(United States) Ed Felter	1–5, 7
(United States) Pete Sherman Racing	McLaren M8F	Chevrolet 7.6 L V8	G	51	(United States) Pete Sherman	1–4
(United States) Lodestar Enterprises	McLaren M6A	Chevrolet 7.0 L V8		57	(United States) Dave Causey	5
(United States) Monte's Motors	Lola T162	Chevrolet 7.0 L V8		57	(United States) Monte Shelton	6
(United States) Brumos Porsche-Audi Corporation	Porsche 911 Carrera RSR	Porsche 3.0 L Flat-6	G	58	(United States) Peter Gregg	3
(United States) Brumos Porsche-Audi Corporation	Porsche 917/10	Porsche 5.0 L Turbo Flat-12	G	59	(United States) Hurley Haywood	All
(United States) Peckham Engineering	McLaren M8C	Chevrolet 7.4 L V8	G	64	(United States) Bob Peckham	4–5, 7–8
(United States) Roy Woods Racing, Inc.	McLaren M20	Chevrolet 8.1 L V8	G	73	(United Kingdom) David Hobbs	All
(United States) Kampo Enterprises	Lola T220	Chevrolet V8	G	74	(United States) Dan Kampo	5
(United States) R. D. Klempel	Lola T163	Chevrolet 7.5 L V8		77	(United States) Bob Klempel	1
(United States) Durant Racing	Lola T163	Chevrolet 7.0 L V8	G	81	(United States) Dick Durant	1
(United States) R. S. Racing Enterprises	McLaren M6B	Chevrolet 7.1 L V8		91	(United States) Leon Sirois	5
(United States) Commander Motor Homes Racing Team	McLaren M20	Chevrolet 7.6 L Turbo V8	F	96	(United States) Mario Andretti	2, 7–8
(United States) Commander Motor Homes Racing Team	McLaren M20	Chevrolet 7.6 L Turbo V8	F	96	(Canada) John Cannon	7–8
(United States) Commander Motor Homes Racing Team	McLaren M8F	Chevrolet 7.6 L V8	F	97	(United States) Milt Minter	2
(United States) Commander Motor Homes Racing Team	McLaren M8F	Chevrolet 7.6 L V8	F	97	(United States) Bob Brown	3–8
(United States) Commander Motor Homes Racing Team	McLaren M8F	Chevrolet 7.6 L V8	F	98	(United States) Danny Hopkins	2–6
(United States) Commander Motor Homes Racing Team	McLaren M8F	Chevrolet 7.6 L V8	F	98	(Canada) John Cannon	7–8
(United States) Don Nichols	Shadow DN2	Chevrolet 8.1 L V8	G	101	(United Kingdom) Jackie Oliver	1–4, 6–8
(United States) Don Nichols	Shadow DN2	Chevrolet 8.1 L V8	G	101	(United Kingdom) James Hunt	5
(United States) Don Nichols	Shadow DN2	Chevrolet 8.1 L Turbo V8	G	102	(United Kingdom) Jackie Oliver	5
(United States) Don Nichols	Shadow DN2	Chevrolet 8.1 L Turbo V8	G	102	(United Kingdom) Vic Elford	7–8

== Season results ==
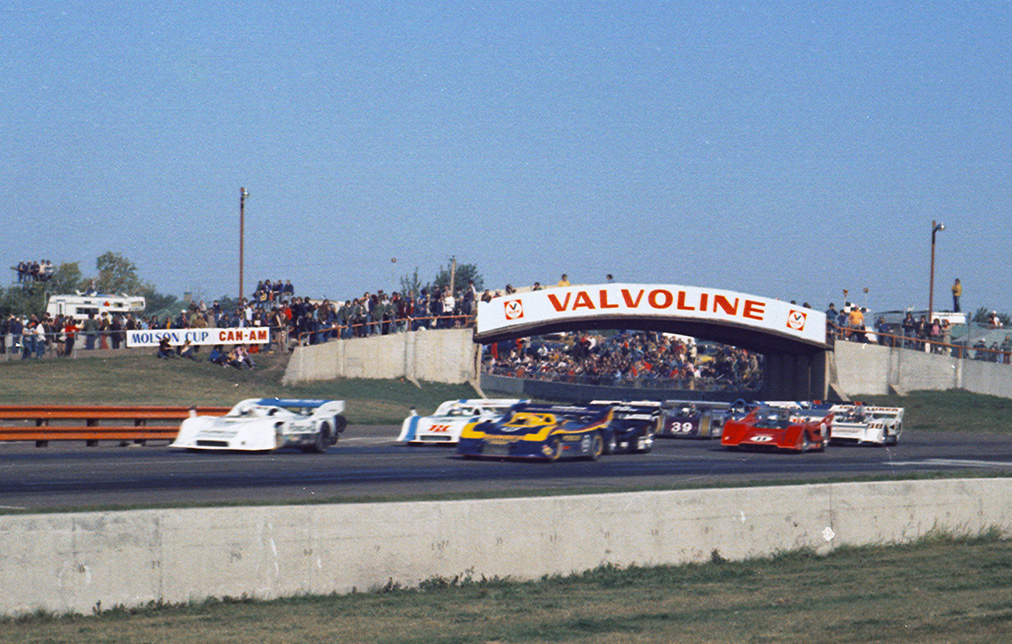
The start of the Molson Cup at Edmonton Speedway Park. Mark Donohue's Penske-Sunoco Porsche 917/30 started in pole position.

Rnd	Circuit	Winning team	Results
Rnd	Circuit	Winning driver	Results
1	Mosport	(United States) #23 Rinzler Motoracing Royal Crown	Results
1	Mosport	(United States) Charlie Kemp	Results
2	Road Atlanta	(United States) #16 Rinzler Motoracing Royal Crown	Results
2	Road Atlanta	(United States) George Follmer	Results
3	Watkins Glen	(United States) #6 Roger Penske Enterprises	Results
3	Watkins Glen	(United States) Mark Donohue	Results
4	Mid-Ohio	(United States) #6 Roger Penske Enterprises	Results
4	Mid-Ohio	(United States) Mark Donohue	Results
5	Road America	(United States) #6 Roger Penske Enterprises	Results
5	Road America	(United States) Mark Donohue	Results
6	Edmonton	(United States) #6 Sunoco Porsche+Audi	Results
6	Edmonton	(United States) Mark Donohue	Results
7	Laguna Seca	(United States) #6 Roger Penske Enterprises	Results
7	Laguna Seca	(United States) Mark Donohue	Results
8	Riverside	(United States) #6 Roger Penske Enterprises	Results
8	Riverside	(United States) Mark Donohue	Results

== Drivers Championship ==
Points are awarded to the top ten finishers in the order of 20-15-12-10-8-6-4-3-2-1.

Pos	Driver	MOS (Canada)	ATL (United States)	WGL (United States)	MOH (United States)	ROA (United States)	EDM (Canada)	LAG (United States)	RIV (United States)	Pts
1	(United States) Mark Donohue	**7**	**2**	**1**	**1**	**1**	**1**	**1**	**1**	139
2	(United States) George Follmer	13	1	20	2	3	2	11	20	62
3	(United States) Hurley Haywood	15	5	21	3	14	DNS	3	2	47
4	(United States) Charlie Kemp	1		4	DNS	12	8	13	3	45
5	(United States) Bob Nagel	3	6	11	13	6	7	6	4	44
6	(South Africa) Jody Scheckter	16	3	3	20	2	12	16	13	39
7	(United Kingdom) David Hobbs	Wth	4	2	19	Wth	4	9	18	37
8	(United States) Scooter Patrick	4	18	10	18	4	6	8	10	31
9	(United Kingdom) Jackie Oliver	20	19	17	8	DNS	3	2	17	30
10	(United States) Steve Durst	5	7	7	10	DNS	5	10	8	29
11	(United States) Bobby Brown			16	5	5	11	4	19	26
12	(United States) Milt Minter		17					5	5	16
13	(Germany) Hans Wiedmer	2	16	15	23					15
14	(United States) Tom Dutton	12	11	6	7	15	10	21	7	15
15	(Canada) John Cannon	6		5				17	15	14
16	(United Kingdom) Derek Bell				4	DNS				10
17	(United States) Bob Peckham				11	Wth		7	6	10
18	(United States) Danny Hopkins		13	13	6	9	15			8
19	(United States) Tom Heyser		8	8	16	10				7
20	(United States) Gary Wilson				9	7			DNS	6
21	(United States) Ed Felter	8	10	18	12	16		20		4
22	(Canada) John Cordts	9	12	19	14	Wth	9	14	14	4
23	(United States) Warren Agor	19	14	12	15	8				3
24	(United States) Pete Sherman	10	9	14	17					3
25	(United States) Peter Gregg			9						2
25	(Germany) Hans Müller-Perschl							Wth	9	2
	(United Kingdom) Brian Redman							12	11	0
	(Canada) David Saville-Peck	18			21	11	14	22	Wth	0
	(United States) William Wonder	11								0
	(United States) Frank Kahlich	Wth							12	0
	(United States) John Gunn						13	23	Wth	0
	(United States) Jigger Sirois					13				0
	(United States) Jim Butcher	14	Wth							0
	(United Kingdom) Vic Elford							15	21	0
	(Germany) Lothar Motschenbacher		15							0
	(United States) Sam Posey								16	0
	(United States) Dick Durant	17				DNS				0
	(United States) Bill Cuddy							18		0
	(United States) Tony Settember							19	Wth	0
	(United States) Gene Fisher		20							0
	(Germany) Willi Kauhsen				22					0
	(United States) Mario Andretti		DNS					DNS	DNS	0
	(United Kingdom) James Hunt					DNS				0
	(United States) Dan Kampo					DNS				0
	(United States) Dave Causey					DNS				0
	(United States) Monte Shelton						DNS			0
	(United States) Bob Earl								Wth	0
Pos	Driver	MOS (Canada)	ATL (United States)	WGL (United States)	MOH (United States)	ROA (United States)	EDM (Canada)	LAG (United States)	RIV (United States)	Pts

Color	Result
Gold	Winner
Silver	2nd place
Bronze	3rd place
Green	4th-6th place
Light Blue	7th–10th place
Dark Blue	Finished (Outside Top 10)
Purple	Did not finish
Red	Did not qualify (DNQ)
Brown	Withdrawn (Wth)
Black	Disqualified (DSQ)
White	Did not start (DNS)
Blank	Did not participate (DNP)
Blank	Driver replacement (Rpl)
Blank	Injured (Inj)
Blank	Race not held (NH)
Blank	Not competing

**In-line notation**
**Bold**	Pole position
