= 1971 Can-Am season =

North American auto racing season

Seasons
- ← 1970 1972 →

The 1971 Canadian-American Challenge Cup was the sixth season of the Can-Am auto racing series. It was contested by FIA Group 7 two-seater racing cars competing in two-hour sprint races. The series began on 13 June 1971 and ended on 31 October 1971, after ten rounds. The series was given official recognition by the Fédération Internationale de l'Automobile for the first time in 1971.

The series was won by Peter Revson driving a McLaren M8F for McLaren Cars.

== Schedule ==
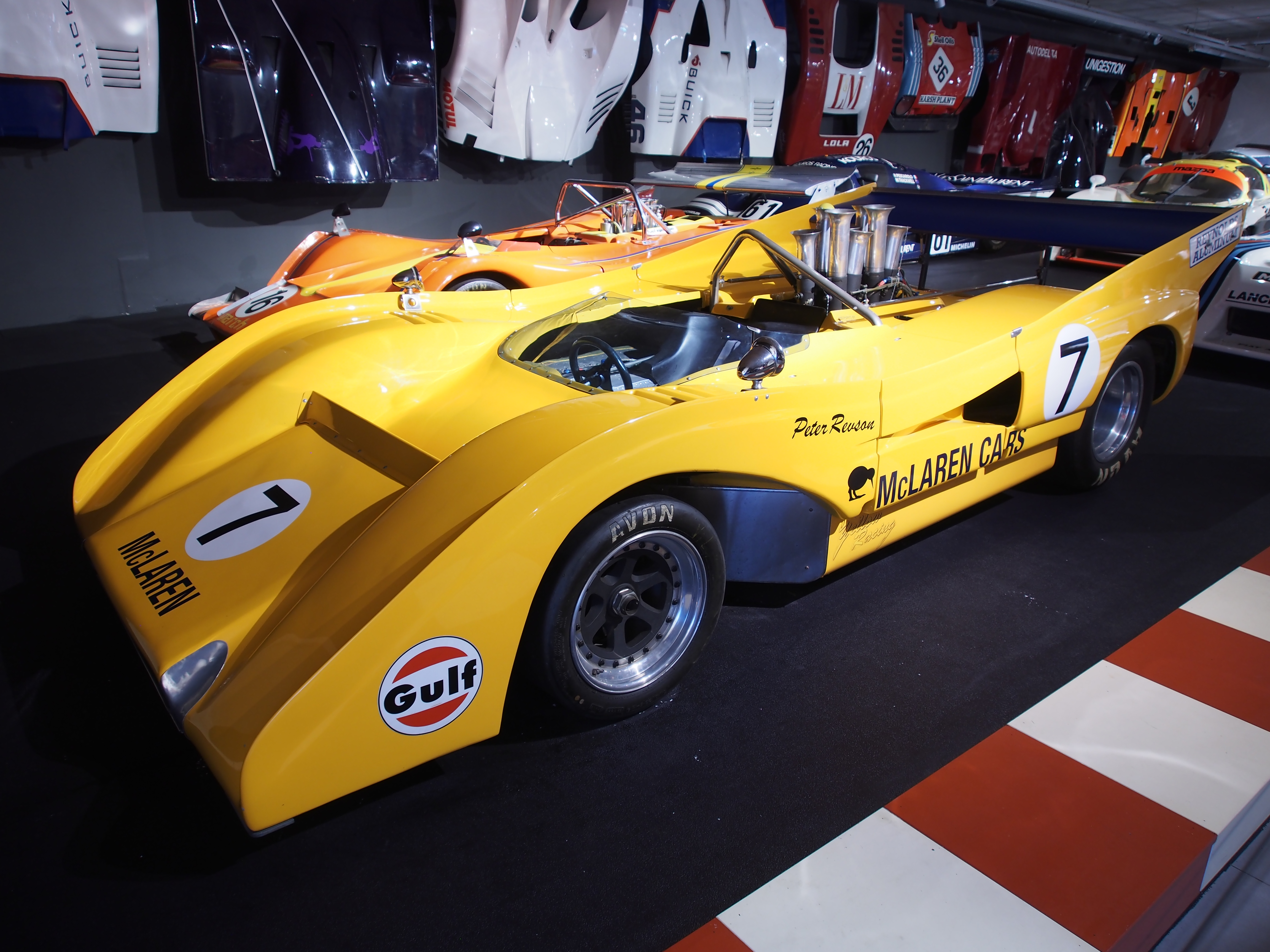
Peter Revson won the series driving a McLaren M8F

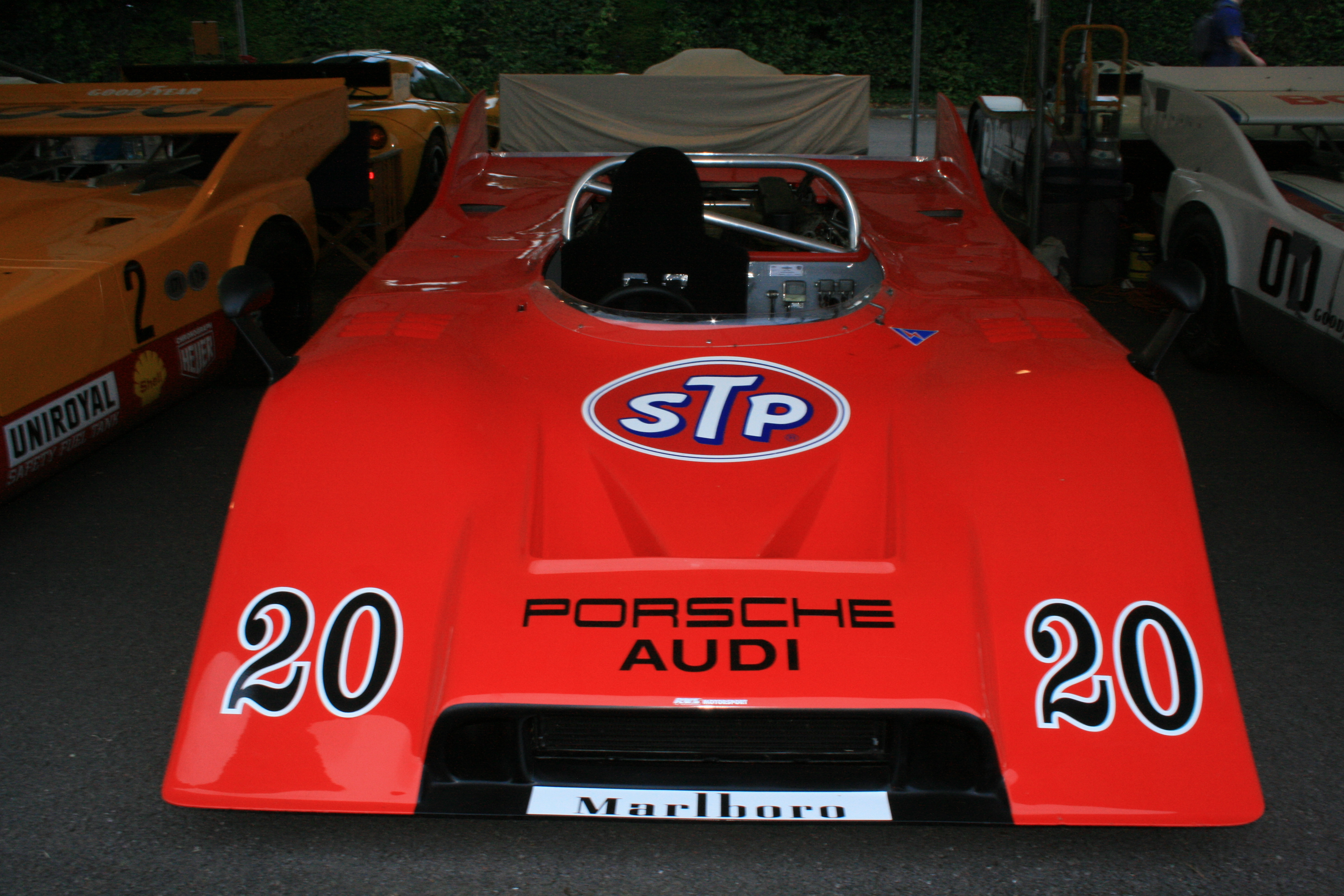
Jo Siffert placed fourth driving a Porsche 917/10

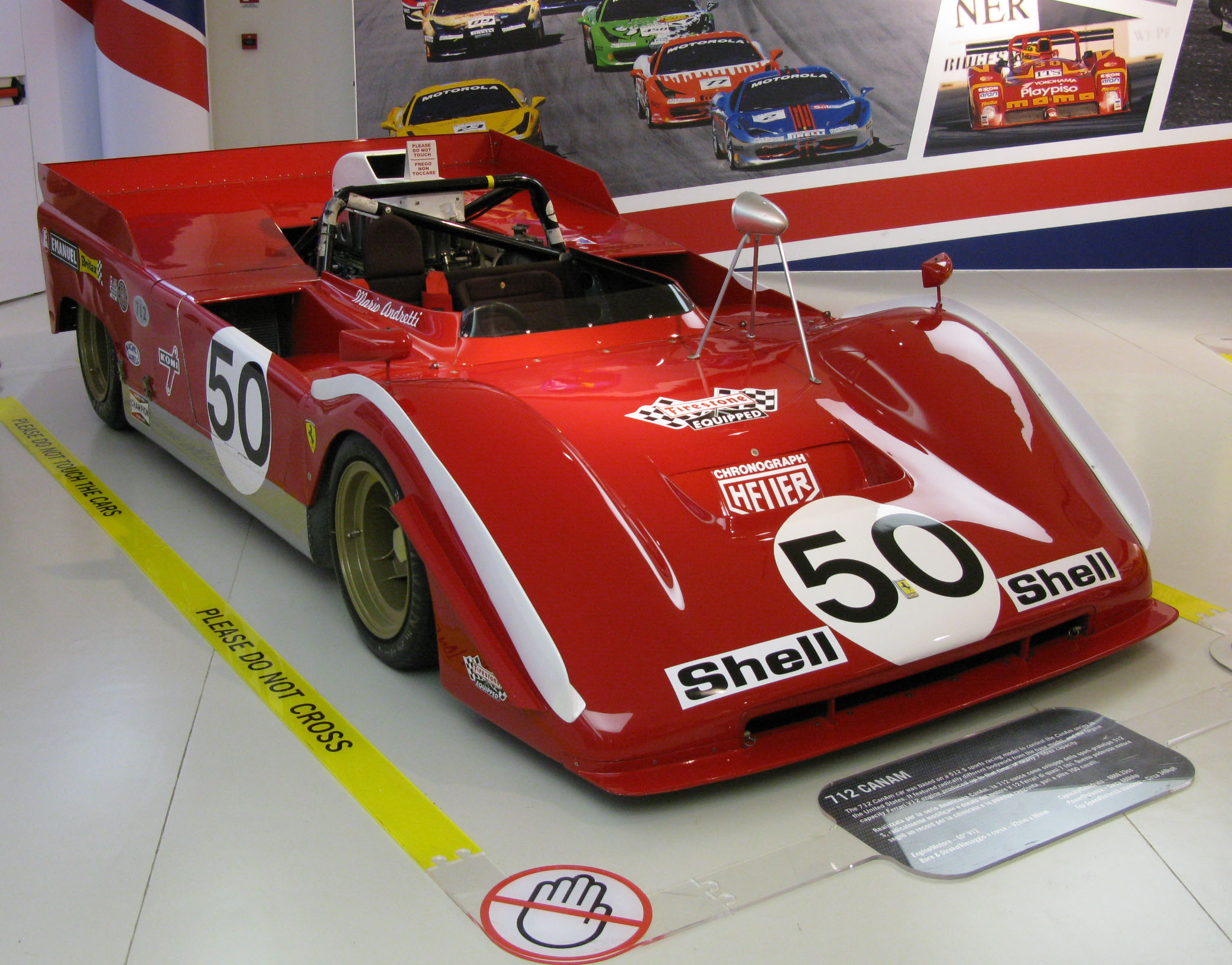
Mario Andretti placed 19th driving a Ferrari 712M

Rnd	Race	Circuit	Date
1	Labatt's 200	Mosport Park	June 13
2	Mont-Tremblant 50	Circuit Mont-Tremblant	June 27
3	Road Atlanta Can-Am	Road Atlanta	July 11
4	Watkins Glen Can-Am	Watkins Glen International	July 25
5	Valvoline Can-Am	Mid-Ohio Sports Car Course	August 22
6	Road America Can-Am	Road America	August 29
7	Minneapolis Tribune Grand Prix	Donnybrooke International Raceway	September 12
8	Molson Can-Am	Edmonton Speedway Park	September 26
9	Monterey Castrol Grand Prix	Laguna Seca Raceway	October 17
10	Los Angeles Times Grand Prix	Riverside International Raceway	October 31

== Entries ==
Team	Chassis	Engine	Tire	Number	Drivers	Rounds
(United States) Vasek Polak Racing, Inc.	Porsche 917 PA	Porsche 5.0 L Flat-12	G	0	(United States) Milt Minter	All
(United States) Vasek Polak Racing, Inc.	Porsche 908/02K	Porsche 3.0 L Flat-8	G	24	(United States) Dave Jordan	9–10
(United States) Carl A. Haas Racing Team, Ltd.	Lola T260	Chevrolet 8.1 L V8	G	1	(United Kingdom) Jackie Stewart	All
(United States) Kazato Racing, Ltd. (United States) Carl A. Haas Autmobile Imports, Inc.	Lola T222	Chevrolet 8.1 L V8	G	88	(Japan) Hiroshi Kazato	All
(United States) Kazato Racing, Ltd. (United States) Carl A. Haas Autmobile Imports, Inc.	Lola T222	Chevrolet 8.1 L V8	G	88	(United Kingdom) Vic Elford	3
(United States) Bob Brown Racing, Inc.	McLaren M6B; McLaren M8E	Chevrolet 7.6 L V8	G	3	(United States) Bob Brown	All
(United Kingdom) McLaren Cars Ltd.	McLaren M8F	Chevrolet 8.1 L V8; Chevrolet 8.3 L V8	G	5	(New Zealand) Denny Hulme	All
(United Kingdom) McLaren Cars Ltd.	McLaren M8F	Chevrolet 8.1 L V8; Chevrolet 8.3 L V8	G	7	(United States) Peter Revson	All
(United States) Roger Penske	Ferrari 512 M	Ferrari 5.0 L V12	G	6	(United States) Mark Donohue	4
(United States) William R. Cupp (United States) Tool Crib Inc.	Lola T163	Chevrolet 7.0 L V8		6/16	(United States) Bill Cupp	8–10
(United Kingdom) A. G. Dean	McLaren M8D	Chevrolet 7.0 L V8	G	8	(United States) Chuck Parsons	1–2
(United Kingdom) A. G. Dean	McLaren M8D	Chevrolet 7.0 L V8	G	8	(United Kingdom) David Hobbs	3–4
(United Kingdom) A. G. Dean	McLaren M8D	Chevrolet 7.0 L V8	G	8	(United Kingdom) Tony Dean	5
(United Kingdom) A. G. Dean	Porsche 908/02K	Porsche 3.0 L Flat-8	G	28/85/87	(United States) Steve Matchett	1–2, 4–9
(United Kingdom) A. G. Dean	Porsche 908/02K	Porsche 3.0 L Flat-8	G	28/85/87	(United Kingdom) Tony Dean	10
(United States) American Racing Associates, Inc. (United States) Roy Woods Racing	McLaren M8D	Chevrolet 8.1 L V8	G	8	(United States) Sam Posey	10
(United States) American Racing Associates, Inc. (United States) Roy Woods Racing	McLaren M8D	Chevrolet 8.1 L V8	G	29/2	(United Kingdom) Vic Elford	1–7, 9
(United States) American Racing Associates, Inc. (United States) Roy Woods Racing	McLaren M8D	Chevrolet 8.1 L V8	G	29/2	(United States) George Follmer	10
(United States) William Overhauser Racing, Ltd.	Lola T163	Chevrolet 7.0 L V8	G	9	(United States) Chuck Parsons	5–6
(United States) William Overhauser Racing, Ltd.	Lola T163	Chevrolet 7.0 L V8	G	9	(United States) Merle Brennan	8
(United States) William Overhauser Racing, Ltd.	Lola T163	Chevrolet 7.0 L V8	G	9	(Canada) John Cordts	9–10
(United States) Motschenbacher Racing Enterprises	McLaren M8D	Chevrolet 7.7 L V8	G	11	(Germany) Lothar Motschenbacher	All
(United States) Motschenbacher Racing Enterprises	McLaren M8D	Chevrolet 7.7 L V8	G	12	(United States) Bob Bondurant	1–4
(United States) Motschenbacher Racing Enterprises	McLaren M8D	Chevrolet 7.7 L V8	G	12	(United States) Gregg Young	6–7
(United States) Motschenbacher Racing Enterprises	McLaren M8D	Chevrolet 7.7 L V8	G	12	(United States) Chuck Parsons	8–10
(United States) Place Motor Supply	Lola T160	Chevrolet 8.1 L V8		13	(United States) James Place	3, 6
(United States) North American Racing Team	Ferrari 512 M	Ferrari 5.0 L V12	G	14	(United States) Sam Posey	4
(United States) William Wonder	McLaren M8C	Chevrolet V8		15	(United States) Bill Wonder	1–3
(Canada) Ric Moore	Moore Mk. 2	Chevrolet V8	G	16	(Canada) Ric Moore	8
(United States) David F. Causey	Lola T222	Chevrolet 7.0 L V8	G	17	(United States) Bob Nagel	7
(United States) David F. Causey	Lola T222	Chevrolet 7.0 L V8	G	51	(United States) David Causey	1–3, 5–6, 8–9
(United States) Glen Racing, Ltd.	McLaren M12	Chevrolet 7.0 L V8	G	18	(United States) Ron Goldleaf	1–2
(United States) Glen Racing, Ltd.	McLaren M12	Chevrolet 7.0 L V8	G	18	(United States) Bob Nagel	5
(United States) Glen Racing, Ltd.	McLaren M12	Chevrolet 7.0 L V8	G	18	(United States) Gary Wilson	7–10
(Switzerland) Jo Siffert Automobiles Racing	Porsche 917/10	Porsche 5.0 L Flat-12	G	20	(Switzerland) Jo Siffert	4–9
(United States) Young American Racing Team	Ferrari 512 M	Ferrari 5.0 L V12	G	21	(United States) Gregg Young	4
(United States) Charles Kemp	McLaren M8C	Chevrolet 7.4 L V8	G	23	(United States) Charlie Kemp	1, 3–5, 10
(United States) Dick Barbour Porsche-Audi	Porsche 908/02K	Porsche 3.0 L Flat-8	G	24	(United States) Dick Barbour	1, 3
(United States) Hodges Racing	Hodges Mk. 2	Chevrolet 7.4 L V8	F	25	(United States) Jerry Hodges	5, 9–10
(United States) Midwest Racing	McLaren M6B	Ford 7.0 L V8		27	(United States) Frank Kahlich	1, 3, 6
(United States) Paul Ritsos	Lola T165	Chevrolet V8		28	(United States) Paul Ritsos	4
(Italy) Autodelta SpA	Alfa Romeo T33/3	Alfa Romeo 3.0 L V8	F	30	(Italy) Andrea de Adamich	4
(Italy) Autodelta SpA	Alfa Romeo T33/3	Alfa Romeo 3.0 L V8	F	33	(France) Henri Pescarolo	4
(United States) Nelli Racing	Lola T70 Mk. 3B	Chevrolet 7.0 L V8		32	(United States) Vic Nelli	9–10
(United States) Chuck McConnell	McLaren M6B	Chevrolet 7.0 L V8	G	33	(United States) Chuck McConnell	9–10
(United States) Warren Burmester	McLaren M8C	Chevrolet 7.0 L V8	G	34	(United States) George Drolsom	2–3, 5–10
(United States) Hird Enterprises	Lola T160	Chevrolet 7.0 L V8		35	(United States) Danny Hopkins	1–3, 5, 9–10
(United States) Cliff Apel	McLaren M6B	Chevrolet 7.0 L V8		37	(United States) Cliff Apel	4, 7
(United Kingdom) Sid Taylor Racing	BRM P167	Chevrolet 7.6 L V8	G	38	(United Kingdom) Brian Redman	9
(United Kingdom) Sid Taylor Racing	BRM P167	Chevrolet 7.6 L V8	G	38	(New Zealand) Howden Ganley	10
(Canada) Rainer Brezinka	McLaren M6B	Chevrolet V8	G	39	(Canada) Rainer Brezinka	1–3
(United States) Jim Butcher	Lola T163	Chevrolet 7.0 L V8	G	41	(United States) Jim Butcher	4–10
(United States) Jim Butcher	Lola T160	Chevrolet 7.0 L V8	G	64	(United States) Chuck Frederick	8
(United States) Grand Prix Racing & Development, Ltd.	Lola T160	Chevrolet 7.0 L V8		42	(United States) Oliver Jones	9
(United States) Grand Prix Racing & Development, Ltd.	Lola T160	Chevrolet 7.0 L V8		42	(United States) Steve Pfeifer	10
(United Kingdom) David Piper Racing	Porsche 917K	Porsche 5.0 L Flat-12	G	43	(Portugal) Mario Cabral	4
(United States) Jerry Hansen	Lola T220	Chevrolet 7.0 L V8		44	(United States) Jerry Hansen	7
(Canada) JNO Racing Enterprises, Ltd.	March 707	Chevrolet 7.0 L V8	G	47	(Canada) Gordon Dewar	1–3, 5–6
(Switzerland) Herbert Müller Racing	Ferrari 512 M	Ferrari 5.0 L V12	F	48	(Switzerland) Herbert Müller	4–7
(Canada) Delta Tire Company	Autocoast Ti22 Mk. II	Chevrolet 8.1 L V8	G	49	(United Kingdom) David Hobbs	9–10
(Italy) SpA Ferrari SEFAC	Ferrari 712 M	Ferrari 7.0 L V12	F	50	(United States) Mario Andretti	4
(United States) Auto World, Inc.	McLaren M8B	Chevrolet 7.0 L V8	G	54	(United States) Oscar Koveleski	1
(United States) Auto World, Inc.	McLaren M8B	Chevrolet 7.0 L V8	G	54	(United States) Tony Adamowicz	3–6, 9–10
(Canada) McCaig Racing	McLaren M8E	Chevrolet 7.6 L V8	G	55	(Canada) Roger McCaig	All
(Canada) Performance Engineering Ltd.	McLaren M8C	Chevrolet 8.1 L V8	G	57	(Canada) John Cordts	1–2, 4, 8
(Belgium) Ecurie Francorchamps	Ferrari 512 M	Ferrari 5.0 L V12	F	63	(United Kingdom) Alain de Cadenet	4
(United States) Stan's Werkstatt	McLaren M12	Chevrolet 7.0 L V8	G	66	(United States) Stan Szarkowicz	1–2, 5–7, 10
(United States) Bob Nagel	Lola T222	Chevrolet 7.0 L V8	G	74/16	(United States) Bob Nagel	2–4
(United States) Ferrari West	Ferrari 612 P	Ferrari 5.0 L V12	F G	76	(United States) Jim Adams	1–4, 8–10
(United States) Gregory C. Hodges	Lola T163	Chevrolet 7.0 L V8		77/21	(United States) Gregory Hodges	1–2
(United States) Gregory C. Hodges	Lola T163	Chevrolet 7.0 L V8		77/21	(United States) Steve Weaver	3
(United States) Bob Klempel	McLaren-Elva Mk. III	Chevrolet 7.4 L V8	F	77	(United States) Bob Klempel	5
(United States) Barrett Racing, Inc.	McLaren M6B	Chevrolet 7.0 L V8	G	79	(United States) Tom Dutton	All
(United States) Dick Losk	McLaren-Elva Mk. III	Chevrolet V8		80	(United States) Dick Losk	8
(United States) Racing Associates, Inc.	Lola T163	Chevrolet 7.0 L V8		81	(United States) Dick Durant	1–3, 5–6
(United States) Peck & Hills Furniture	McLaren M6B	Chevrolet 7.0 L V8	G	81	(United States) Jay Hills	9–10
(United States) Gary W. Burke	McLaren-Elva Mk. III	Chevrolet 7.0 L V8	F	84/22	(United States) Gary Burke	9
(United States) Gary W. Burke	McLaren-Elva Mk. III	Chevrolet 7.0 L V8	F	84/22	(United States) Marion Whittington	10
(United States) Fred Parkhill	McLaren M8E	Chevrolet 7.0 L V8		89	(United States) Fred Parkhill	3, 7
(United Kingdom) J. W. Automotive Engineering, Ltd.	Porsche 917K	Porsche 5.0 L Flat-12	F	91	(United Kingdom) Richard Attwood	4
(United Kingdom) J. W. Automotive Engineering, Ltd.	Porsche 917K	Porsche 5.0 L Flat-12	F	92	(Netherlands) Gijs van Lennep	4
(United Kingdom) J. W. Automotive Engineering, Ltd.	Porsche 917K	Porsche 5.0 L Flat-12	F	93	(United Kingdom) Derek Bell	4
(United States) R. S. Racing Enterprises	Lola T70 Mk. 2	Chevrolet 5.7 L V8		91	(United States) Don Devine	5–6
(United States) Ronald Stafford	McLaren-Elva Mk. II	Chevrolet 7.0 L V8		93	(United States) Ron Stafford	9
(United States) Advanced Vehicle Systems	Shadow Mk. II	Chevrolet 8.1 L V8	G	101	(United Kingdom) Jackie Oliver	2–4, 6–10
(Canada) Bauer's Esso	McLaren-Elva Mk. II	Chevrolet V8		168	(Canada) Rudy Bartling	1

== Race results ==
Rnd	Circuit	Winning team	Results
Rnd	Circuit	Winning driver	Results
Rnd	Circuit	Winning car	Results
1	Mosport	(United Kingdom) #5 McLaren Cars	Results
1	Mosport	(New Zealand) Denny Hulme	Results
1	Mosport	McLaren M8F	Results
2	Mont-Tremblant	(United States) #1 Carl Haas Racing	Results
2	Mont-Tremblant	(United Kingdom) Jackie Stewart	Results
2	Mont-Tremblant	Lola T260	Results
3	Road Atlanta	(United Kingdom) #7 McLaren Cars	Results
3	Road Atlanta	(United States) Peter Revson	Results
3	Road Atlanta	McLaren M8F	Results
4	Watkins Glen	(United Kingdom) #7 McLaren Cars	Results
4	Watkins Glen	(United States) Peter Revson	Results
4	Watkins Glen	McLaren M8F	Results
5	Mid-Ohio	(United States) #1 Carl Haas Racing	Results
5	Mid-Ohio	(United Kingdom) Jackie Stewart	Results
5	Mid-Ohio	Lola T260	Results
6	Road America	(United Kingdom) #7 McLaren Cars	Results
6	Road America	(United States) Peter Revson	Results
6	Road America	McLaren M8F	Results
7	Donnybrooke	(United Kingdom) #7 McLaren Cars	Results
7	Donnybrooke	(United States) Peter Revson	Results
7	Donnybrooke	McLaren M8F	Results
8	Edmonton	(United Kingdom) #5 McLaren Cars	Results
8	Edmonton	(New Zealand) Denny Hulme	Results
8	Edmonton	McLaren M8F	Results
9	Laguna Seca	(United Kingdom) #7 McLaren Cars	Results
9	Laguna Seca	(United States) Peter Revson	Results
9	Laguna Seca	McLaren M8F	Results
10	Riverside	(United Kingdom) #5 McLaren Cars	Results
10	Riverside	(New Zealand) Denny Hulme	Results
10	Riverside	McLaren M8F	Results

== Series standings ==
Points were awarded to the top ten finishers in the order of 20–15–12–10–8–6–4–3–2–1. Only the best four placings from the first five races and the best four places from the second five races could be counted towards a driver's series total. Points earned but not counted are marked by parenthesis.

Jo Siffert missed the first three Can-Am rounds as he raced in both World Championships, finishing 5th with BRM in the 1971 Formula One season, and also was one of the 1971 World Sportscar Championship-winning Porsche factory drivers, assigned to a Gulf-Wyer-Porsche 917K. Both sportscar series shared the "Six-Hours and The Can-Am" weekend at Watkins Glen in late July, final race of the WSC and 4th round of Can-Am. Siffert died the weekend before the last Can-Am round, in the 24 October 1971 non-championship Formula One 1971 World Championship Victory Race at Brands Hatch, his fourth-place finish was determined posthumously. Siffert raced a new, still naturally aspirated Porsche 917/10, while the Porsche 917PA he had driven to 4th in 1969 was now raced by Milt Minter who finished 6th.

Pos	Driver	Team	Car	Engine	Rd1	Rd2	Rd3	Rd4	Rd5	Rd6	Rd7	Rd8	Rd9	Rd10	Total
1	(United States) Peter Revson	(United Kingdom) McLaren Cars	McLaren M8F	Chevrolet	15	12	20	20	(4)	20	20		20	15	142
2	(New Zealand) Denny Hulme	(United Kingdom) McLaren Cars	McLaren M8F	Chevrolet	20	15	15	15			15	20	12	20	132
3	(United Kingdom) Jackie Stewart	(United States) Carl Haas Racing	Lola T260	Chevrolet		20			20		6	15	15		76
4	(Switzerland) Jo Siffert	(United States) STP-Jo Siffert	Porsche 917/10	Porsche Flat-12				12	15	15	8	10	8		68
5	(Germany) Lothar Motschenbacher	(United States) Motschenbacher Racing	McLaren M8D	Chevrolet	12	8	12			10		4	6		52
6	(United States) Milt Minter	(United States) Vasek Polak Racing	Porsche 917PA	Porsche		3	8		6		4	8	2	6	37
7	(United States) Tony Adamowicz	(United States) Auto World	McLaren M8D	Chevrolet			10	8	12				4		34
8	(United States) Chuck Parsons	(United Kingdom) A.G. Dean (United States) World Racing (United States) Motschenbacher Racing	McLaren M8D; Lola T160/3; McLaren M8E/D	Chevrolet		10			8			3	1	8	30
9	(United Kingdom) Vic Elford	(United States) American Racing Associates (United States) Roy Woods Racing	McLaren M8E; McLaren M8D	Chevrolet				3		12	10				25
10	(Japan) Hiroshi Kazato	(United States) Carl Haas Racing	Lola T222	Chevrolet	2	6		1		8	2				19
11	(United States) Sam Posey	(United States) North American Racing Team (United States) Sam Woods Racing	Ferrari 512M; McLaren M8E	Ferrari; Chevrolet				6						10	16
12	(Canada) John Cordts	(Canada) John Cordts (United States) World Racing	McLaren M8C; Lola T160	Chevrolet	8							6			14
13	(United States) Dave Causey	(United States) Dave Causey	Lola T222	Chevrolet	4	4				6					14
14=	(United States) Gregg Young	(United States) Young American Racing Team (United States) Motschenbacher Racing	Ferrari 512M; McLaren M8E/D	Ferrari; Chevrolet							12				12
14=	(United Kingdom) Jackie Oliver	(United States) Advanced Vehicle Systems	Shadow Mk.2	Chevrolet								12			12
14=	(New Zealand) Howden Ganley	(United Kingdom) Sid Taylor Racing	BRM P167	Chevrolet										12	12
17	(United States) Tom Dutton	(United States) Barrett Racing	McLaren M6B	Chevrolet		2	3		3	4					12
18	(Switzerland) Herbert Müller	(Switzerland) Müller Racing	Ferrari 512M	Ferrari					10	1					11
19=	(United States) Bob Bondurant	(United States) Motschenbacher Racing	McLaren M8E/D	Chevrolet	10										10
19=	(United States) Mario Andretti	(Italy) SpA Ferrari SEFAC	Ferrari 712M	Ferrari				10							10
19=	(United Kingdom) Brian Redman	(United Kingdom) Sid Taylor Racing	BRM P167	Chevrolet									10		10
22	(United States) Bobby Brown	(United States) Bob Brown Racing	McLaren M6B; McLaren M8E	Chevrolet	6						3				9
23	(Canada) Roger McCaig	(Canada) McCaig Racing	McLaren M8E	Chevrolet	1		4							4	9
24	(United States) Dick Durant	(United States) Dick Durant	Lola T163	Chevrolet		1	6								7
25	(United States) Jim Adams	(United States) Earle-Cord Racing	Ferrari 512P	Ferrari	3		1						3		7
26	(United Kingdom) Steve Matchett	(United Kingdom) A.G. Dean	Porsche 908/02	Porsche					2	3					5
27	(Italy) Andrea de Adamich	(Italy) Autodelta SpA	Alfa Romeo T33/3	Alfa Romeo				4							4
28	(United States) Gary Wilson	(United States) Great Western Champagne	McLaren M12	Chevrolet							1		3		4
29	(United States) George Drolsom	(United States) Warren Burmester	McLaren M8C	Chevrolet						2		2			4
30	(United States) Charlie Kemp	(United States) Charlie Kemp	McLaren M8C	Chevrolet			2							1	3
31=	(Netherlands) Gijs van Lennep	(United Kingdom) J.W. Automotive	Porsche 917K	Porsche				2							2
31=	(United States) George Follmer	(United States) Roy Woods Racing	McLaren M8D	Chevrolet										2	2
33=	(United States) Jim Butcher	(United States) Jim Butcher	Lola T163	Chevrolet					1						1
33=	(United States) Bob Nagel	(United States) Bob Nagel (United States) Glen Racing Ltd. (United States) Dave Causey	Lola T222; McLaren M12; Lola T222	Chevrolet							1				1
