= 1968 Can-Am season =

North American auto racing season

Seasons
- ← 1967 1969 →

The 1968 Canadian-American Challenge Cup was the third season of the Can-Am auto racing series. It consisted of FIA Group 7 racing cars running two-hour sprint events. It began September 1, 1968, and ended November 10, 1968, after six rounds.

== Schedule ==
Rnd	Race	Circuit	Date
1	Road America Can-Am	Road America	September 1
2	Bridgehampton Grand Prix	Bridgehampton Race Circuit	September 15
3	Klondike Trail 200	Edmonton Speedway Park	September 29
4	Monterey Grand Prix	Laguna Seca Raceway	October 13
5	Los Angeles Times Grand Prix	Riverside International Raceway	October 27
6	Stardust Grand Prix	Stardust International Raceway	November 10

== Entries ==
Team	Chassis	Engine	Tire	Number	Drivers	Rounds
(United States) Don Jensen	Burnett Mk. II	Chevrolet 6.0 L V8	G	0	(United States) Don Jensen	4–5
(United States) Autodynamics Corporation	Caldwell D-7B; Caldwell D-7C	Chevrolet 6.0 L V8	G	1/2	(United States) Sam Posey	1
(United States) Autodynamics Corporation	Caldwell D-7B; Caldwell D-7C	Chevrolet 6.0 L V8	G	1/2	(United States) Brett Lunger	2–5
(United States) Autodynamics Corporation	Lola T160	Chevrolet 6.1 L V8; Chevrolet 7.0 L V8	G	2/1	(United States) Brett Lunger	1
(United States) Autodynamics Corporation	Lola T160	Chevrolet 6.1 L V8; Chevrolet 7.0 L V8	G	2/1	(United States) Sam Posey	2–6
(United Kingdom) McLaren Cars, Ltd.	McLaren M8A	Chevrolet 7.0 L V8	G	4	(New Zealand) Bruce McLaren	All
(United Kingdom) McLaren Cars, Ltd.	McLaren M8A	Chevrolet 7.0 L V8	G	5	(New Zealand) Denny Hulme	All
(United States) Roger Penske Racing Enterprises	McLaren M6B	Chevrolet 7.0 L V8	G	6	(United States) Mark Donohue	All
(United Kingdom) Team Surtees, Ltd.	Lola T160 TS	Chevrolet 7.0 L V8	F	7	(United Kingdom) John Surtees	2–3, 5
(Switzerland) Ecurie Suisse	McLaren M6B	Chevrolet 7.0 L V8	G	9	(Sweden) Jo Bonnier	1–3, 5–6
(United States) Carl A. Haas Racing Teams, Ltd.	Lola T160	Chevrolet 7.0 L V8	G	10	(United States) Chuck Parsons	All
(United States) Carl A. Haas Racing Teams, Ltd.	Lola T70 Mk. 3 Lola T160	Chevrolet 6.0 L V8	G	26	(United States) Skip Scott	All
(United States) Leader Card Racers	McLaren M6B	Ford 6.2 L V8	G	11	(Germany) Lothar Motschenbacher	All
(United States) Eric Hauser	Lola T70 Mk. 3	Chevrolet 6.5 L V8	G	12	(United States) Jerry Entin	4–5
(United States) Homer J. Rader	Lola T70 Mk. 3	Chevrolet 5.5 L V8		14	(United States) Lynn Kyser	1–2
(United States) American Racing Motors	Lola T70 Mk. 3B; Lola T160	Chevrolet 5.9 L V8	G	15	(United States) Brian O'Neil	1–5
(United States) American Racing Motors	Lola T70 Mk. 3B; Lola T160	Chevrolet 5.9 L V8	G	20	(United States) Anson Johnson	2
(United States) George Follmer Enterprises	Lola T70 Mk. 3B	Ford 7.0 L V8	F	16	(United States) George Follmer	5–6
(United States) Hollywood Sports Cars & T/G Racing Company	McLaren M6B	Chevrolet 5.9 L V8	F	17	(United States) Jerry Titus	3–6
(United States) Ronald K. Courtney	McLaren-Elva Mk. III	Chevrolet 6.0 L V8	G	18	(United States) Ron Courtney	1–2
(United States) Competition Imports Racing Team	Lola T70 Mk. 3 GT	Chevrolet 6.0 L V8	F	18	(United States) Ed Leslie	4–6
(United States) Gary M. Wilson	McLaren-Elva Mk. IIB; Lola T70 Mk. 3	Chevrolet 6.2 L V8	G	19	(United States) Gary Wilson	1, 3, 5–6
(United States) George Bignotti	Lola T70 Mk. 3 Lola T160	Ford 5.0 L V8; Ford 7.0 L V8	F	21/3	(United States) Mario Andretti	1–2, 5–6
(United States) Jim Paul	McLaren-Elva Mk. IIIB	Chevrolet 5.5 L V8	G	21/22	(United States) Jim Paul	4–5
(United States) North American Racing Team	Ferrari 330 P4	Ferrari 4.2 L V12	G	22	(Mexico) Pedro Rodríguez	1–2
(United States) Modern Classic Motors	Ferrari 612 P	Ferrari 6.2 L V12	F	23	(New Zealand) Chris Amon	6
(United States) Robert J. Nagel	Lola T70 Mk. 3	Ford 7.0 L V8	G	24	(United States) Bob Nagel	2, 6
(United States) Ralph C. Salyer	McKee Mk. 10	Oldsmobile 6.4 L V8	G	25	(United States) Charlie Hayes	1, 3–6
(United States) Ecurie Greene, Inc.	McLaren M6B	Chevrolet 6.0 L V8	G	28	(United States) Dick Brown	1–2, 5–6
(United States) George L. Ralph	Lola T70 Mk. 2	Chevrolet 6.0 L V8	F	31/37	(United States) George Ralph	1–2
(United States) Agapiou Brothers	Lola T70 Mk. 3B	Ford 7.0 L V8	G	32/31	(United States) Ronnie Bucknum	1–3
(United States) Agapiou Brothers	Lola T70 Mk. 3B	Ford 7.0 L V8	G	34	(United States) George Follmer	4
(United States) Warren Burmester	Lola T70 Mk. 3	Chevrolet 6.3 L V8	F	34	(United States) George Drolsom	5
(United States) All American Racers	Lola T160; McLaren M6B	Ford 5.0 L V8; Ford-Weslake 5.3 L V8	G	36	(United States) Swede Savage	2–6
(United States) All American Racers	McLaren M6B; Lola T160	Ford-Weslake 5.3 L V8; Ford 7.0 L V8	G	48	(United States) Dan Gurney	2–6
(United States) Sports Racing Pacific	Lola T70 Mk. 2B	Chevrolet 6.2 L V8	G	37	(United States) Dick Barbour	5–6
(United States) Sports Racing Pacific	Lola T70 Mk. 2B	Chevrolet 6.2 L V8	G	37	(United States) George Hollinger	5
(Canada) Heimrath Racing	McLaren-Elva Mk. IIB	Chevrolet 5.9 L V8	G	39	(Canada) Ludwig Heimrath	1
(United States) Bill Campbell-Dan Blocker	Genie Mk. X	Chevrolet 5.0 L V8	G	41	(United States) Ron La Peer	4
(United States) Jay Hills	McLaren-Elva Mk. III	Chevrolet 6.9 L V8	G	41	(United States) Jay Hills	5–6
(United States) Land & Cattle, Inc.	McLaren-Elva Mk. III	Chevrolet 5.9 L V8	G	42	(United States) Candido DaMota	1–2
(United States) R. B. Galloway	Lola T70 Mk. 3 McLaren M6B	Chevrolet 6.0 L V8	G	43	(United States) Richard Galloway	2–6
(United States) R. B. Galloway	Lola T70 Mk. 3 McLaren M6B	Chevrolet 6.0 L V8	G	43	(United States) Fred Pipin	2
(United States) Jerry Hansen	McLaren M6A	Chevrolet 7.0 L V8	G	44	(United States) Jerry Hansen	1–2, 4–6
(United States) Jef Stevens	Lola T70 Mk. 3B	Chevrolet 5.9 L V8	G	45	(United States) Jef Stevens	3, 6
(United States) Shelby Racing Co., Inc.	McLaren M6B	Ford 7.0 L V8	G	52	(United States) Peter Revson	All
(United States) Clem H. Abrams	Lotus 19	Ford 4.7 L V8		54	(United States) Clem Abrams	5
(Canada) Roger McCaig	McLaren M6B	Chevrolet 6.1 L V8	G	55	(Canada) Roger McCaig	3, 5–6
(United States) Ralph Trieschmann	McLaren-Elva Mk. III	Chevrolet 6.0 L V8		56	(United States) Ralph Trieschmann	1
(Canada) Performance Engineering, Ltd.	McLaren-Elva Mk. III	Chevrolet 6.0 L V8	G	57	(Canada) John Cordts	1, 3
(United States) Monte's Motors	Porsche 906	Porsche 2.5 L Flat-6	F	57	(United States) Monte Shelton	4
(United States) Jack Douglas Chevrolet	Lola T70 Mk. 3	Chevrolet 6.0 L V8		61	(United States) Fred Pipin	1–2
(United States) Continental Accessories	McLaren-Elva Mk. IIB	Chevrolet 6.0 L V8	F	62	(Canada) John Cannon	4–6
(United States) Tero Corvette	Lola T70 Mk. 3	Chevrolet 6.0 L V8		63	(United States) Roy Kumnick	1, 4
(United States) Williams & Swanson Racing	Burnett Mk. 3	Chevrolet 7.0 L V8	G	64	(United States) Stan Burnett	4–5
(United States) Chaparral Cars, Inc.	Chaparral 2G	Chevrolet 7.0 L V8	F	66	(United States) Jim Hall	All
(United States) Ron Herrera	McLaren-Elva Mk. II	Chevrolet V8		71	(United States) Ron Herrera	5
(United States) Webster Racing	Lola T70 Mk. 3	Chevrolet 6.0 L V8	F	76	(United States) Tony Settember	4–6
(United States) Janke Auto Company	McLaren-Elva Mk. III	Chevrolet 5.9 L V8		77/72	(United States) Leonard Janke	1, 6
(United States) Automotion of San Diego	Lola T70 Mk. II	Chevrolet 6.0 L V8	F	77	(United States) Jack Millikan	4–6
(Canada) George Eaton Racing	McLaren-Elva Mk. III	Ford-Weslake 5.3 L V8; Ford 6.2 L V8	F	98	(Canada) George Eaton	All
(United States) Mac's Super Gloss	Lola T70 Mk. 3	Chevrolet 6.0 L V8	F	99	(United States) Bill Young	3, 5–6

== Season results ==
Rnd	Circuit	Winning team	Results
Rnd	Circuit	Winning driver	Results
1	Road America	(United Kingdom) #5 Bruce McLaren Motor Racing	Results
1	Road America	(New Zealand) Denny Hulme	Results
2	Bridgehampton	(United States) #6 Roger Penske Racing	Results
2	Bridgehampton	(United States) Mark Donohue	Results
3	Edmonton	(United Kingdom) #5 Bruce McLaren Motor Racing	Results
3	Edmonton	(New Zealand) Denny Hulme	Results
4	Laguna Seca	(Canada) #62 John Cannon	Results
4	Laguna Seca	(Canada) John Cannon	Results
5	Riverside	(United Kingdom) #4 Bruce McLaren Motor Racing	Results
5	Riverside	(New Zealand) Bruce McLaren	Results
6	Stardust	(United Kingdom) #5 Bruce McLaren Motor Racing	Results
6	Stardust	(New Zealand) Denny Hulme	Results

== Drivers Championship ==
Points are awarded to the top six finishers in the order of 9-6-4-3-2-1.

Pos	Driver	Team	Car	Engine	Rd 1	Rd 2	Rd 3	Rd 4	Rd 5	Rd 6	Total
1	(New Zealand) Denny Hulme	(United Kingdom) Bruce McLaren Motor Racing	McLaren M8A	Chevrolet	1	Ret	1	2	5	1	35
2	(New Zealand) Bruce McLaren	(United Kingdom) Bruce McLaren Motor Racing	McLaren M8A	Chevrolet	2	Ret	2	5	1	6	24
3	(United States) Mark Donohue	(United States) Roger Penske Racing	McLaren M6A	Chevrolet	3	1	3	8	2	DNS	23
4	(United States) Jim Hall	(United States) Chaparral Cars Inc.	Chaparral 2G	Chevrolet	5	2	11	DNS	3	Ret	12
5	(Germany) Lothar Motschenbacher	(United States) Dana Chevrolet Racing	McLaren M6B	Ford	6	3	Ret	4	4	Ret	11
6	(Canada) John Cannon	(Canada) John Cannon	McLaren M1B	Chevrolet				1	6	Ret	10
7	(United States) George Follmer	(United States) Agapiou Brothers	Lola T70 Mk.3B	Ford				Ret	Ret	2	6
8	(United States) Jerry Titus	(Canada) Terry Godsall	McLaren M6B	Chevrolet			Ret	6	13	3	5
9=	(United States) Sam Posey	(United States) Caldwell Autodynamics	Caldwell D7C; Lola T160	Chevrolet	10	8	4	9	Ret	5	5
9=	(United States) Chuck Parsons	(United States) Carl A. Haas Racing Teams	Lola T160	Chevrolet	Ret	Ret	5	Ret	11	4	5
11	(Canada) George Eaton	(Canada) George Eaton Racing	McLaren M1C	Ford	8	Ret	10	3	Ret	7	4
12=	(United States) Peter Revson	(United States) Shelby American Racing	McLaren M6B	Ford	4	Ret	Ret	12	Ret	Ret	3
12=	(United States) Swede Savage	(United States) All American Racers	Lola T160; McLaren M6B	Ford		4	Ret	Ret	8	Ret	3
14	(United States) Dick Brown	(United States) Ecurie Green Inc.	McLaren M6B	Chevrolet	Ret	5			9	9	2
15=	(United States) Dan Gurney	(United States) All American Racers	McLaren M6B; Lola T160	Ford		6	Ret	Ret	Ret	Ret	1
15=	(United States) Charlie Hayes	(United States) Salyer Racing	McKee Mk.10	Oldsmobile	7		6	DNS	Ret	Ret	1
Pos	Driver	Team	Car	Engine	Rd 1	Rd 2	Rd 3	Rd 4	Rd 5	Rd 6	Total
