= 1973 Road Atlanta Can-Am =

Layout of the Road Atlanta (1970-1997)

The 1973 Carling Can-Am was the second round of the 1973 Can-Am season. It was held July 8, 1973, at Road Atlanta in Braselton, Georgia. It was the fourth Can-Am race held at the track.

== Results ==
- Pole position: Mark Donohue, 1:12.950 (123.866 mph (199.343 km/h))
- Fastest lap: Mark Donohue, 1:14 (122 mph (196 km/h))
- Race distance: 226 miles (364 km) in two heats
- Winner's average speed: 117.09 miles per hour (188.44 km/h)

Pos	No	Driver	Car	Team	Laps	Time/Retired	Grid	Points
1	16	(United States) George Follmer	Porsche 917/10 TC	(United States) Rinzler Motoracing/Royal Crown	90	1:55:45.400	2	20
2	6	(United States) Mark Donohue	Porsche 917/30 TC	(United States) Roger Penske Enterprises	90		1	15
3	0	(South Africa) Jody Scheckter	Porsche 917/10 TC	(United States) Vasek Polak Racing, Inc.	89	-1 lap	3	12
4	73	(United Kingdom) David Hobbs	McLaren M20-Chevrolet	(United States) Roy Woods Racing	87	-3 laps	7	10
5	59	(United States) Hurley Haywood	Porsche 917/10 TC	(United States) Brumos Racing	85	-5 laps	4	8
6	17	(United States) Bob Nagel	Lola T260-Chevrolet	(United States) Nagel Racing	84	-6 laps	10	6
7	3	(United States) Steve Durst	Porsche 917/10	(United States) Vasek Polak Racing, Inc.	83	-7 laps	15	4
8	14	(United States) Tom Heyser	Lola T260-Chevrolet	(United States) Tom Heyser	78	-12 laps	16	3
9	51	(United States) Pete Sherman	McLaren M8F-Chevrolet	(United States) Dave Causey	74	-16 laps	20	2
10	47	(United States) Ed Felter	McLaren M8E-Chevrolet	(United States) Blue Magic Corporation	71	-19 laps	17	1
11	34	(United States) Tom Dutton	McLaren M8C-Chevrolet	(United States) Burmester Racing	65	-25 laps	13	
12 DNF	9	(Canada) John Cordts	McLaren M8D-Chevrolet	(United States) William Overhauser Racing	49	Overheating; out of fuel	18	
13	98	(United States) Danny Hopkins	McLaren M8F-Chevrolet	(United States) Commander Motor Homes	47	Spun	14	
14	13	(United States) Warren Agor	McLaren M8FP-Chevrolet	(United States) Warren Agor Racing	41	Ring gear	19	
15	11	(United States) Lothar Motschenbacher	McLaren M8D-Chevrolet	(United States) Motschenbacher Racing	38	Vapor lock	9	
DNF	4	(Germany) Hans Wiedmer	Porsche 917/10 TC	(Germany) Hans Wiedmer	28	Driver ill	12	
DNF	97	(United States) Milt Minter	McLaren M8F-Chevrolet	(United States) Commander Motor Homes	19	Engine bearing	11	
DNF	8	(United States) Scooter Patrick	McLaren M8F-Chevrolet	(United States) U.S. Racing	14	Accident	8	
DNF	101	(United Kingdom) Jackie Oliver	Shadow DN2-Chevrolet	(United States) Don Nichols	11	Suspension	5	
DNF	18	(United States) Gene Fisher	Lola T222-Chevrolet	(United States) Gene Fisher	2	Unknown	21	
DNS	96	(United States) Mario Andretti	McLaren M20-Chevrolet	(United States) Commander Motor Homes		Engine	6	

=== Heat 1 ===
Pos	No	Driver	Car	Laps	Time/Retired
1	6	(United States) Mark Donohue	Porsche 917/30 TC	40	
2	16	(United States) George Follmer	Porsche 917/10 TC	40	
3	0	(South Africa) Jody Scheckter	Porsche 917/10 TC	39	-1 lap
4	73	(United Kingdom) David Hobbs	McLaren M20-Chevrolet	39	-1 lap
5	59	(United States) Hurley Haywood	Porsche 917/10 TC	38	-2 laps
6	17	(United States) Bob Nagel	Lola T260-Chevrolet	38	-2 laps
7	11	(United States) Lothar Motschenbacher	McLaren M8D-Chevrolet	38	-2 laps
8	3	(United States) Steve Durst	Porsche 917/10	37	-3 laps
9	98	(United States) Danny Hopkins	McLaren M8F-Chevrolet	37	-3 laps
10	47	(United States) Ed Felter	McLaren M8E-Chevrolet	36	-4 laps
11	13	(United States) Warren Agor	McLaren M8FP-Chevrolet	35	-5 laps
12	14	(United States) Tom Heyser	Lola T260-Chevrolet	35	-5 laps
13	51	(United States) Pete Sherman	McLaren M8F-Chevrolet	33	-7 laps
DNF	97	(United States) Milt Minter	McLaren M8F-Chevrolet	19	Electrics
DNF	34	(United States) Tom Dutton	McLaren M8C-Chevrolet	19	
DNF	4	(Germany) Hans Wiedmer	Porsche 917/10 TC	18	Driver ill
DNF	8	(United States) Scooter Patrick	McLaren M8F-Chevrolet	14	Accident
DNF	101	(United Kingdom) Jackie Oliver	Shadow DN2-Chevrolet	11	Suspension
DNF	9	(Canada) John Cordts	McLaren M8D-Chevrolet	7	Overheating
DNF	18	(United States) Gene Fisher	Lola T222-Chevrolet	2	Unknown
DNS	96	(United States) Mario Andretti	McLaren M20-Chevrolet		Engine

=== Heat 2 ===
Pos	No	Driver	Car	Laps	Time/Retired
1	16	(United States) George Follmer	Porsche 917/10 TC	50	
2	6	(United States) Mark Donohue	Porsche 917/30 TC	50	
3	0	(South Africa) Jody Scheckter	Porsche 917/10 TC	50	
4	73	(United Kingdom) David Hobbs	McLaren M20-Chevrolet	48	-2 laps
5	59	(United States) Hurley Haywood	Porsche 917/10 TC	47	-3 laps
6	3	(United States) Steve Durst	Porsche 917/10	46	-4 laps
7	17	(United States) Bob Nagel	Lola T260-Chevrolet	46	-4 laps
8	34	(United States) Tom Dutton	McLaren M8C-Chevrolet	46	-4 laps
9	14	(United States) Tom Heyser	Lola T260-Chevrolet	43	-7 laps
10	51	(United States) Pete Sherman	McLaren M8F-Chevrolet	41	-9 laps
11	47	(United States) Ed Felter	McLaren M8E-Chevrolet	35	-15 laps
DNF	9	(Canada) John Cordts	McLaren M8D-Chevrolet	32	Out of fuel
DNF	4	(Germany) Hans Wiedmer	Porsche 917/10 TC	10	DNF
DNF	98	(United States) Danny Hopkins	McLaren M8F-Chevrolet	10	Spun
DNF	13	(United States) Warren Agor	McLaren M8FP-Chevrolet	10	DNF
DNF	11	(United States) Lothar Motschenbacher	McLaren M8D-Chevrolet	0	Vapor lock
DNS	8	(United States) Scooter Patrick	McLaren M8F-Chevrolet		
DNS	18	(United States) Gene Fisher	Lola T222-Chevrolet		
DNS	96	(United States) Mario Andretti	McLaren M20-Chevrolet		
DNS	97	(United States) Milt Minter	McLaren M8F-Chevrolet		
DNS	101	(United Kingdom) Jackie Oliver	Shadow DN2-Chevrolet		
