= 1971 Road Atlanta Can-Am =

Layout of the Road Atlanta (1970-1997)

The 1971 Road Atlanta Can-Am race was the third round of the 1971 Can-Am Challenge Cup. It was held July 11, 1971, at Road Atlanta in Braselton, Georgia. It was the second Can-Am race held at the track.

== Results ==
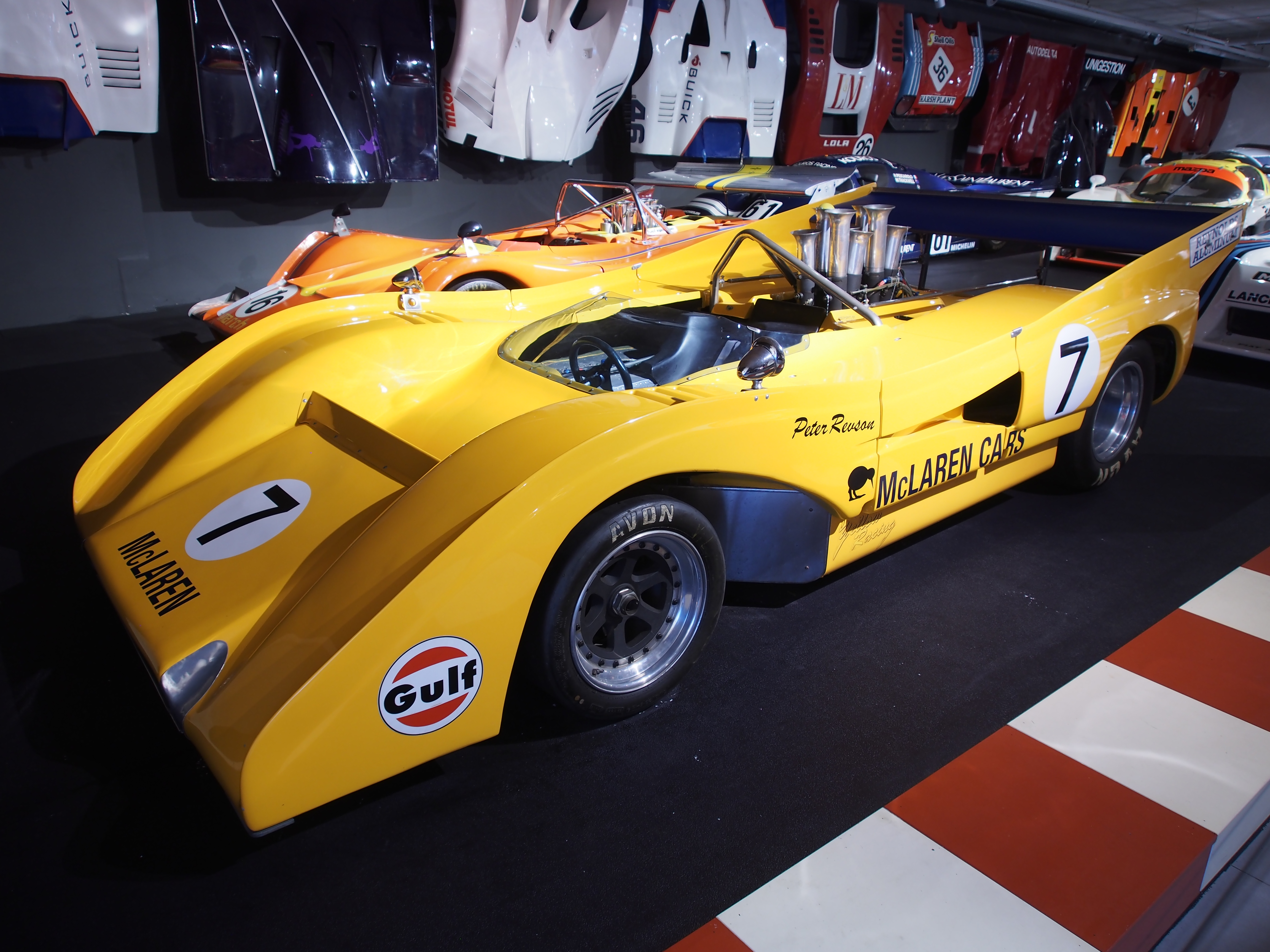
Peter Revson won the race driving a McLaren M8F

- Pole position: Denny Hulme, 1:17.700 (116.757 mph (187.902 km/h))
- Fastest lap: Jackie Stewart (lap 28), 1:17.42 (117.179 mph (188.581 km/h))
- Race distance: 189.06 miles (304.26 km)
- Winner's average speed: 111.193 miles per hour (178.948 km/h)

Pos	No	Driver	Car	Team	Laps	Time/Retired	Grid	Points
1	7	(United States) Peter Revson	McLaren M8F-Chevrolet	(United Kingdom) McLaren Cars, Ltd.	75	1:42:09	2	20
2	5	(New Zealand) Denny Hulme	McLaren M8F-Chevrolet	(United Kingdom) McLaren Cars, Ltd.	75	1:42:29	1	15
3	11	(United States) Lothar Motschenbacher	McLaren M8D-Chevrolet	(United States) Motschenbacher Racing	74	-1 lap	5	12
4	54	(United States) Tony Adamowicz	McLaren M8B-Chevrolet	(United States) Auto World	72	-3 laps	7	10
5	0	(United States) Milt Minter	Porsche 917 PA	(United States) Vasek Polak Racing	71	-4 laps	11	8
6	81	(United States) Dick Durant	Lola T163-Chevrolet	(United States) Dick Durant	68	-7 laps	18	6
7	55	(Canada) Roger McCaig	McLaren M8E-Chevrolet	(Canada) McCaig Racing	68	-7 laps	15	4
8	79	(United States) Tom Dutton	McLaren M6B-Chevrolet	(United States) Barrett Racing	67	-8 laps	16	3
9	23	(United States) Charlie Kemp	McLaren M8C-Chevrolet	(United States) Charlie Kemp	64	-11 laps	20	2
10	76	(United States) Jim Adams	Ferrari 512P	(United States) Earle-Cord Racing	64	Con rod	10	1
11	1	(United Kingdom) Jackie Stewart	Lola T260-Chevrolet	(United States) Carl Haas Racing	62	Rear damper mounting	3	
12	24	(United States) Dick Barbour	Porsche 908/2	(United States) Vasek Polak Racing	60	-15 laps	23	
DNF	88	(Japan) Hiroshi Kazato	Lola T222-Chevrolet	(United States) Carl Haas Racing	55	heat exhaustion	8	
DNF	16	(United States) Bob Nagel	Lola T222-Chevrolet	(United States) Bob Nagel	54	Overheating	17	
DNF	101	(United Kingdom) Jackie Oliver	Shadow Mk.2-Chevrolet	(United States) Advanced Vehicle Systems	45	Fuel feed	4	
DNF	34	(United States) George Drolsom	McLaren M6C-Chevrolet	(United States) Warren Burmester	42	Vapor lock	21	
DNF	29	(United Kingdom) Vic Elford	McLaren M6E-Chevrolet	(United States) American Racing Associates	35	Oil pressure, clutch	9	
DNF	51	(United States) Dave Causey	Lola T222-Chevrolet	(United States) Dave Causey	33	Collision	13	
DNF	8	(United Kingdom) David Hobbs	McLaren M8D-Chevrolet	(United Kingdom) A.G. Dean	31	Blown engine	12	
DNF	15	(United States) William Wonder	McLaren M8C-Chevrolet	(United States) Bill Wonder	27	Oil leak	22	
DNF	12	(United States) Bob Bondurant	McLaren M8E-Chevrolet	(United States) Motschenbacher Racing	20	Oil pressure	6	
DNF	35	(United States) Danny Hopkins	Lola T160-Chevrolet	Hird Enterprises	18	Dropped valve	24	
DNF	27	(United States) Frank Kahlich	McLaren M6B-Chevrolet	(United States) Midwest Racing	12	Overheating	19	
DNF	21	Steve Weaver	Lola T160-Chevrolet	Gregory Hodges	4	Oil pressure	25	
DNF	47	(Canada) Gordon Dewar	March 707-Oldsmobile	JND Racing	1	Differential	14	
DNS	-	(United States) Fred Parkhill	McLaren M6E-Chevrolet	(United States) Fred Parkhill				
DNS	-	Fuller	Lola T70-Chevrolet	?				
DNS	3	(United States) Bobby Brown	McLaren M6B-Chevrolet	(United States) Bob Brown Racing				
DNS	13	(United States) James Place	Lola T160-Chevrolet	(United States) Place Motor Supply				
DNS	39	(Canada) Rainer Brezinka	McLaren M6B-Chevrolet	(Canada) Rainer Brezinka		Accident in practice		
