= 1974 Road Atlanta Can-Am =

Layout of Road Atlanta (1970-1997)

The 1974 WQXI Can-Am was the second round of the 1974 Can-Am season. It was held July 7, 1974, at Road Atlanta in Braselton, Georgia. It was the fifth Can-Am race held at the track.

== Results ==
- Pole position: George Follmer, 1:14.9 (121.1 mph (194.9 km/h))
- Fastest lap: Jackie Oliver, 1:16.1 (119.2 mph (191.8 km/h))
- Race distance: 111 miles (179 km) (1 hour duration)
- Winner's average speed: 116.45 miles per hour (187.41 km/h)
- Attendance: 15,000

Pos	No	Driver	Car	Team	Laps	Time/Retired	Grid	Points
1	101	(United Kingdom) Jackie Oliver	Shadow DN4-Chevrolet	(United States) Phoenix Racing Organizations, Inc.	44	0:57:07.800	2	20
2	1	(United States) George Follmer	Shadow DN4-Chevrolet	(United States) Phoenix Racing Organizations, Inc.	44	0:57:37.800	1	15
3	11	(United States) Lothar Motschenbacher	McLaren M8F-Chevrolet	(United States) Motschenbacher Racing	42	-2 laps	18	12
4	7	(Switzerland) Herbert Müller	Ferrari 512M Spyder	(Switzerland) Herbert Müller Racing	42	-2 laps	5	10
5	39	(United States) John Gunn	Lola T260-Chevrolet	(United States) Racing Specialties	41	-3 laps	20	8
6	5	(United States) Dick Durant	McLaren M8R-Chevrolet	(United States) Burmester Racing	39	-5 laps	7	6
7	16	(United States) Dennis Aase	Porsche 908/2	(United States) Dennis Aase	39	-5 laps	8	4
8	45	(Canada) David Saville-Peck	Costello SP8-Oldsmobile	(Canada) Ennerdale Racing	38	-6 laps	10	3
9	41	(United States) Mike Brockman	McLaren M8C-Chevrolet	(United States) Jim Butcher Racing	38	-6 laps	14	2
DNF	10	(United States) William Morrow	Lola T163-Chevrolet	(United States) Bill Morrow	24	Engine	17	1
DNF	9	(United States) Bill Overhauser	McLaren M8D-Chevrolet	(United States) William Overhauser Racing	18	Overheating	15	
DNF	17	(United States) Bob Nagel	Lola T260-Chevrolet	(United States) Nagel Racing	13	Accident	6	
DNF	12	(United States) Bob Lazier	McLaren M8E-Chevrolet	(United States) Page Racing	12	Fuel injection	9	
DNF	75	(United States) Leonard Janke	McLaren M8C-Chevrolet	(United States) Janke Auto Co.	9	Oil pressure	16	
DNF	77	(United States) Bob Klempel	Lola T163-Chevrolet	(United States) Bob Klempel	6	Gear linkage	11	
DNF	6	(Canada) John Cordts	McLaren M8F-Chevrolet	(United States) Performance Engineering Ltd.	4	Oil pressure	4	
DNF	14	(United States) Jerry Mull	McLaren M8C-Chevrolet	(United States) Jerry L. Mull	2	Oil pressure	12	
DNS	8	(United States) Scooter Patrick	McLaren M20-Chevrolet	(United States) U.S. Racing			3	
DNS	55	(United States) Wes McNay	McLaren M12-Chevrolet	(United States) Wes McNay			13	
DNS	3	(United States) Bill Cuddy	McLaren M8F-Chevrolet	(United States) Bill Cuddy			19	
