= 1974 Can-Am season =

North American auto racing season

Seasons
- ← 1973 1977 →

The 1974 Canadian-American Challenge Cup was the ninth and final season of the original Can-Am auto racing series. It consisted of FIA Group 7 racing cars running half hour Sprint races followed by hour-long Cup races. It began June 16, 1974, and was cancelled after the fifth round on August 25, 1974.

The 1973 season had been dominated by the turbocharged Porsche 917/30 of Team Penske driven by Mark Donohue, and then came the 1973 oil crisis. As response, CanAm limited fuel consumption. The new, nimble Shadow DN4 dominated a short season in which even several underpowered old 1969 Porsche 908/02 scored points.

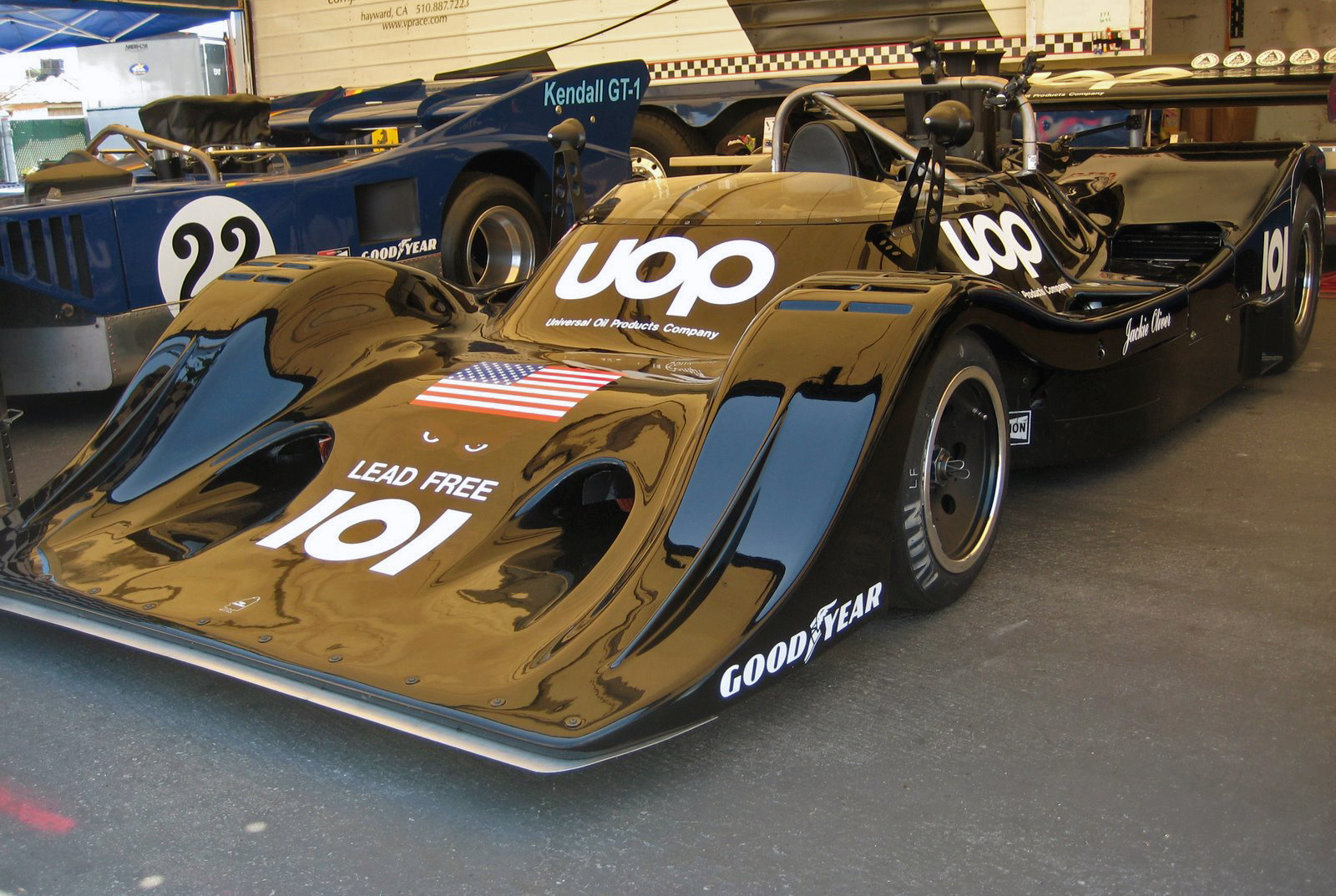
Shadow DN4

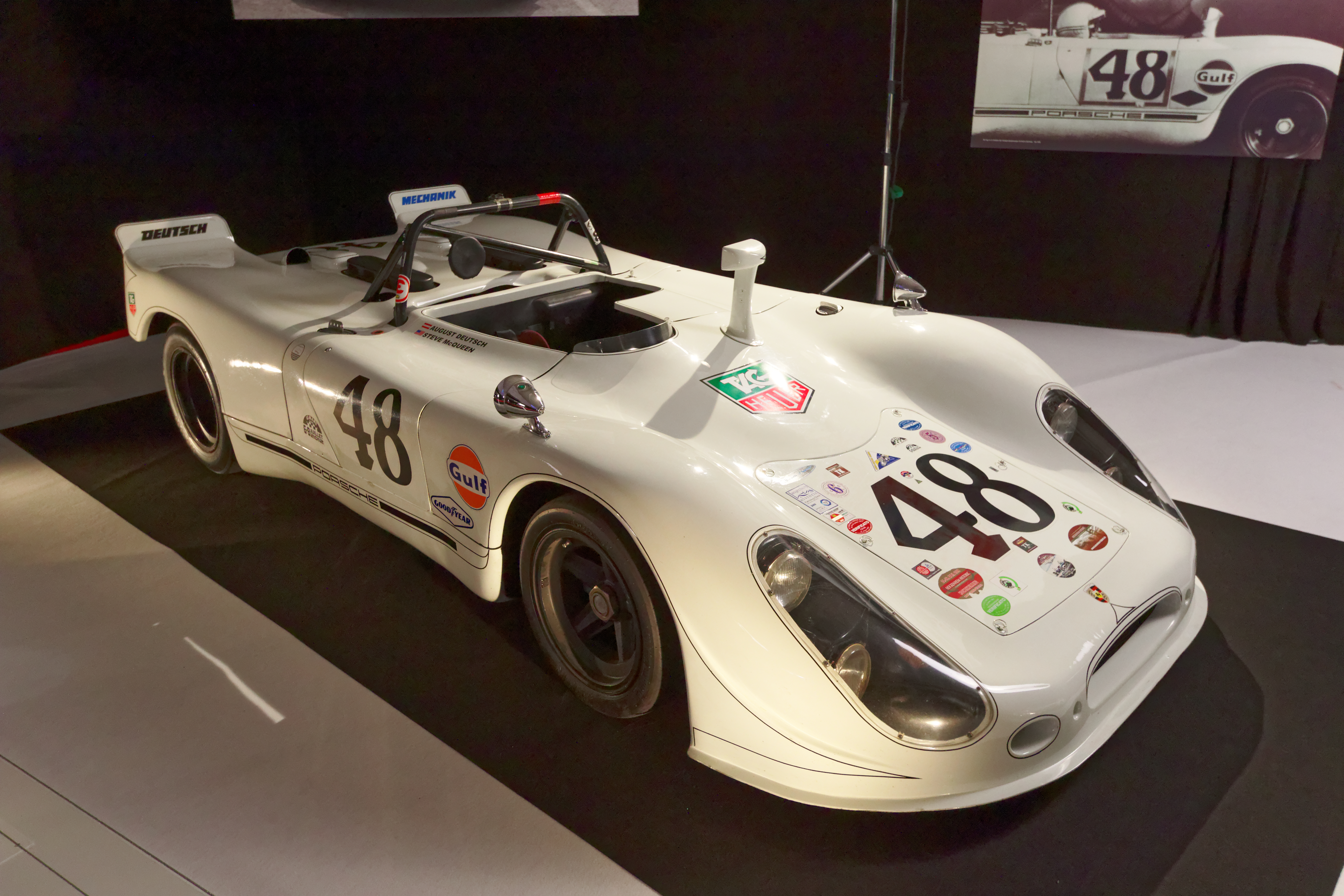
1969 Porsche 908/02

Following the cancellation of the series, many teams turned to the new Camel GT Challenge, although the cars were not of the same type as had been used in Can-Am. The Can-Am name would return in 1977, although the formula used would vary greatly from the original series, concentrating instead on open-wheel-based chassis.

== Schedule ==
All rounds had a Sprint qualifying heat first to determine the starting order for the Cup event. The results of the Sprint and Cup were not combined. Events held at Edmonton International Speedway and Laguna Seca Raceway were cancelled during the course of the season, while the final round of the series at Riverside International Raceway was cancelled by the track owner in August 1974.

Rnd	Race	Circuit	Date
1	Labatt's Blue Trophy	Mosport Park	June 16
2	WQXI Can-Am	Road Atlanta	July 7
3	Watkins Glen Can-Am	Watkins Glen International	July 14
4	Buckeye Cup	Mid-Ohio Sports Car Course	August 11
5	Road America Can-Am	Road America	August 25
-	Los Angeles Times Grand Prix	Riverside International Raceway	October 27 (cancelled)

== Season results ==
Rnd	Circuit	Winning team	Results
Rnd	Circuit	Winning driver	Results
1	Mosport	(United States) #101 Phoenix Racing Organizations	Results
1	Mosport	(United Kingdom) Jackie Oliver	Results
2	Road Atlanta	(United States) #101 Phoenix Racing Organizations	Results
2	Road Atlanta	(United Kingdom) Jackie Oliver	Results
3	Watkins Glen	(United States) #101 Phoenix Racing Organisations	Results
3	Watkins Glen	(United Kingdom) Jackie Oliver	Results
4	Mid-Ohio	(United States) #101 Phoenix Racing Organisations	Results
4	Mid-Ohio	(United Kingdom) Jackie Oliver	Results
5	Road America	(United States) #8 U.S. Racing	Results
5	Road America	(United States) Scooter Patrick	Results

== Drivers Championship ==
Points are awarded to the top ten finishers in the order of 20-15-12-10-8-6-4-3-2-1.

Pos	Driver	Team	Car	Engine	Rnd 1	Rnd 2	Rnd 3	Rnd 4	Rnd 5	Total
1	(United Kingdom) Jackie Oliver	(United States) Phoenix Racing Organisations	Shadow DN4	Chevrolet 8.1L V8	20	20	20	20	2	82
2	(United States) George Follmer	(United States) Phoenix Racing Organisations	Shadow DN4	Chevrolet 8.1L V8	15	15	15			45
3	(United States) Scooter Patrick	(United States) U.S. Racing	McLaren M20	Chevrolet 8.1L V8	12		12		20	44
4	(United States) Bob Nagel	(United States) Nagel Racing	Lola T260	Chevrolet 7.6L V8	10		10	10	10	40
5	(United States) John Gunn	(United States) Racing Specialties	Lola T260	Chevrolet 7.0L V8		8	2	1	12	23
6	(United States) Lothar Motschenbacher	(United States) Motschenbacher Racing	McLaren M8F	Chevrolet 8.1L V8	8	12			1	21
7	(United States) Dick Durant	(United States) Burmester Racing	McLaren M8R	Chevrolet 7.6L V8	4	6	8			18
8	(United States) Dennis Aase	(United States) Dennis Aase	Porsche 908/02	Porsche 3.0L Flat-8		4	6	4	3	17
9	(Switzerland) Herbert Müller	(Switzerland) Herbert Müller Racing	Ferrari 512M	Ferrari 5.7L V12		10			6	16
10=	(United Kingdom) Brian Redman	(United States) North American Racing Team (United States) Penske Racing	Ferrari 512M; Porsche 917/30	Ferrari5.7L V12; Porsche 5.4L Turbo Flat-12				15		15
10=	(Canada) John Cordts	(United States) Performance Engineering	McLaren M8F	Chevrolet 8.1L V8					15	15
12	(United States) Hurley Haywood	(United States) Brumos Racing	Porsche 917/10	Porsche 5.4L Turbo Flat-12				12		12
13=	(United States) Monte Shelton	(United States) Monte Shelton	McLaren M8F	Chevrolet 7.6L V8				8		8
13=	(United States) Gary Wilson	(United States) Sting Racing Team	Sting GW1	Chevrolet 7.0L V8					8	8
15	(Canada) David Saville-Peck	(Canada) Ennerdale Racing	Costello SP8	Oldsmobile V8	2	3		2		7
16=	(United States) Gene Fisher	(United States) Bailey Speed Shop	Lola T222	Chevrolet 7.0L V8	6					6
16=	(United States) Roy Woods	(United States) William Overhauser Racing	McLaren M8D	Chevrolet 7.6L V8				6		6
18	(United States) Bill Cuddy	(United States) Bill Cuddy	McLaren M8F	Chevrolet 7.6L V8			1		4	5
19	(Canada) Horst Petermann	(Canada) Horst Petermann	Porsche 908/02	Porsche 3.0L Flat-8			4			4
20=	(Canada) Harry Bytzek	(Canada) Rainer Brezinka	Porsche 908/02	Porsche 3.0L Flat-8	3					3
20=	(Italy) Arturo Merzario	(Italy) Autodelta	Alfa Romeo 33TT12	Alfa Romeo 4.0L V8			3			3
20=	(United States) Bob Lazier	(United States) Page Racing	McLaren M8E	Chevrolet 7.6L V8				3		3
23	(United States) Mike Brockman	(United States) Jim Butcher Racing	McLaren M8C	Chevrolet 7.2L V8		2				2
24=	(United States) Tom Butz	(United States) Lodestar Enterprises	McLaren M8FP	Chevrolet 7.6L V8	1					1
24=	(United States) William Morrow	(United States) Bill Morrow	Lola T163	Chevrolet V8		1				1
