= Road Atlanta Can-Am =

Motor race held between 1970 to 1983

Layout of the Road Atlanta (1970-1997)

The Road Atlanta Can-Am races were Can-Am series sports car races held at Road Atlanta in Braselton, Georgia, from 1970 until 1984.

== Winners ==
| Date | Driver | Team | Car | Distance/Duration | Race title | Report |
|---|---|---|---|---|---|---|
| 1970 | (United Kingdom) Tony Dean | (United Kingdom) A. G. Dean Ltd. | Porsche 908/3 | 300 km (190 mi) | | report |
| 1971 | (United States) Peter Revson | (New Zealand) McLaren Cars Ltd. | McLaren M8F-Chevrolet | 300 km (190 mi) | | report |
| 1972 | (United States) George Follmer | (United States) Penske Racing | Porsche 917/10 | 300 km (190 mi) | | report |
| 1973 | (United States) George Follmer | (United States) Rinzler Motoracing / Royal Crown | Porsche 917/10 | 2 hours | Carling Can-Am | report |
| 1974 | (United Kingdom) Jackie Oliver | (United Kingdom) Phoenix Racing Organizations, Inc. | Shadow DN4-Chevrolet | 1 hour | WQXI Can-Am | report |
1975-1976 Series not contested
| 1977 | No race | | | | | |
| 1978 | (Australia) Alan Jones | (United States) Carl A. Haas Racing Team, Ltd. | Lola T333CS-Chevrolet | 1 hour | Citicorp Can-Am Challenge | report |
| 1979 | (Finland) Keke Rosberg | (United States) Newman-Freeman Racing | Spyder NF-11-Chevrolet | 1 hour | Citicorp Can-Am Challenge | report |
| 1980 | (Australia) Geoff Brabham | (Belgium) Racing Team V.D.S. | Lola T530-Chevrolet | 125 miles (201 km) | SCCA Citicorp Can-Am | report |
| 1981 | No race | | | | | |
| 1982 | (United States) Al Unser Jr. | (United States) Galles Racing | Frissbee-Galles GR2-Chevrolet | 150 miles (240 km) | The G.E. Silicons Grand Prix | report |
| 1983 | No race | | | | | |
| 1984 | (United Kingdom) Jim Crawford | RK Racing | March 847-Chevrolet | 1 hour | CRC Chemicals Can-Am Challenge | report |

== See also ==
- Grand Prix of Atlanta
- Petit Le Mans
