= Shadow DN2 =

American sports prototype racing cars

- Category: Can-Am (Group 7)
- Constructor: Shadow
- Designers: Tony Southgate; Peter Bryant
- Predecessor: Shadow Mk.II
- Successor: Shadow DN4

Technical specifications
- Chassis: Fiberglass aluminum semi-monocoque tub
- Suspension (front): Double wishbone, coil springs over damper, anti-roll bar
- Suspension (rear): Lower suspension, coil springs over damper, anti-roll bar
- Width: 82.5 in (209.6 cm)
- Axle track: 62 in (157.5 cm) (Front); 61 in (154.9 cm) (Rear)
- Wheelbase: 103 in (261.6 cm)
- Engine: Chevrolet 8,095 cc (494 cu in) V8 engine twin-turbocharged mid-engined
- Transmission: Hewland 4-speed manual
- Power: 800–1,200 hp (600–890 kW); 981–985 lb⋅ft (1,330–1,335 N⋅m) of torque
- Weight: 1,654 lb (750.2 kg)
- Tyres: Firestone

Competition history
- Notable entrants: Advanced Vehicle Systems; Don Nichol's Racing
- Notable drivers: (United Kingdom) Jackie Oliver (Brazil) José Carlos Pace
- Debut: 1972 Can-Am Mosport

The Shadow DN2, also known as the Shadow Mk.III, is a purpose-built sports prototype race car, designed, developed and built by Shadow Racing Cars to Group 7 racing specifications, to compete in the Can-Am racing series, in 1972 and 1973. It was powered by an extremely powerful Chevrolet big-block engine, developing between 800–1,200 hp (600–890 kW), depending on boost pressure levels, and generating an asphalt-shredding 985 lb⋅ft (1,335 N⋅m) of torque The turbocharged system was used for three races, then the team switched back to a naturally aspirated engine, still producing 735 hp (548 kW); which was more than enough to get the job done.
