= Stardust International Raceway =

Former race track

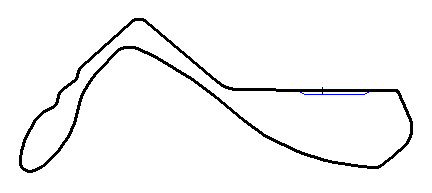
- Road Course (1965–1971)
- Location: Spring Valley, Nevada, United States
- Coordinates: 36°6′28″N 115°15′9″W
- Owner: Stardust Racing Association
- Broke ground: 25 July 1965; 61 years ago
- Opened: November 1965; 60 years ago
- Closed: October 1971; 54 years ago
- Major events: NHRA (1967–1969, 1971); USAC Champ Car (1968); Can-Am (1966–1968); United States Road Racing Championship (1966–1967); Trans-Am (1967)

Road Course (1965–1971)
- Surface: Asphalt
- Length: 3.000 mi (4.828 km)
- Turns: 13
- Race lap record: 1:30.950 ( (New Zealand) Bruce McLaren, McLaren M8A, 1968, Can-Am)

The Stardust International Raceway was an auto racing track in present-day Spring Valley, Nevada, United States, in the Las Vegas Valley. It featured a flat, 3.000 mi (4.828 km), 13-turn road course, and a quarter-mile drag strip. Some track maps depicted the road course with 10 numbered turns.

Stardust International Raceway was developed in 1965 by the Stardust Racing Association, a Nevada corporation headed by the primary owner of the Desert Inn and Stardust hotel-casinos. The track was developed ostensibly to attract high rollers to the Stardust hotel. The Stardust Racing Association also owned the property and functioned as event promoter.

In 1966 it began hosting the season finale of the Can-Am championship. In 1968 the USAC Championship Car series held a race at Stardust. The drag strip hosted the NHRA Stardust National Open in 1967, 1968, 1969, and 1971.

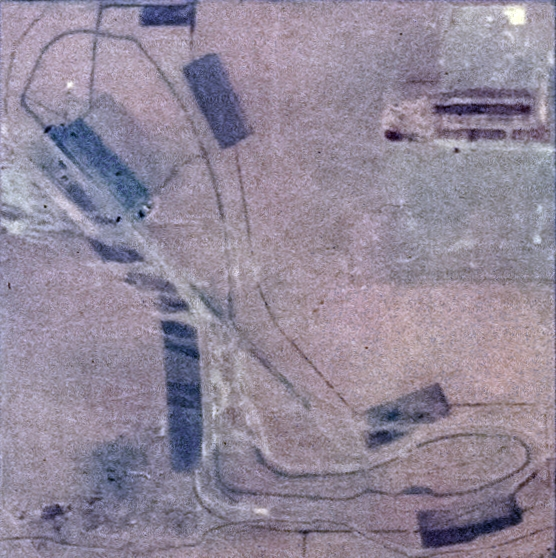
Stardust International Raceway in October 1971, the month of its closing

The Stardust Racing Association was dissolved on April 1, 1968, 1 day after the USAC Stardust 150. The hotel and raceway were sold in January 1969 to the Parvin-Dohrmann Corporation, and the new ownership closed the track shortly thereafter. Larry Horton, the track's manager, re-opened the drag strip in August 1970 and ran drag racing events until October 1971. Real estate developers Pardee Homes acquired the Stardust International Raceway property and related adjacent properties in August 1970 and built the Spring Valley community. Pardee commenced residential development on a portion of the property as drag racing events were still in operation directly adjacent. The track was replaced by the Las Vegas Speedrome, which opened in 1972 as a drag strip and road course. It was subsequently expanded in 1985 with a 3/8 mile paved oval, in 1996 with a 1.5 mile oval, when the circuits current name, Las Vegas Motor Speedway, was used, and in 2000 with the current drag strip location.

== Results ==
=== Sports car ===
Year	Driver	Entrant	Car	Distance/Duration	Championship	Report
1965	(United States) Hap Sharp	(United States) Chaparral Cars	Chaparral 2A-Chevrolet	200 miles (320 km)	Competition Press & Autoweek Series	report
1966	(Canada) John Cannon	Dan Blocker	Genie Mk.10-Chevrolet	180 miles (290 km)	United States Road Racing Championship	report
1966	(United Kingdom) John Surtees	(United Kingdom) Team Surtees	Lola T70 Mk.2-Chevrolet	210 miles (340 km)	Can-Am	report
1967	(United States) Mark Donohue	(United States) Roger Penske	Lola T70 Mk.3-Chevrolet	183 miles (295 km)	United States Road Racing Championship	report
1967	(United Kingdom) John Surtees	(United Kingdom) Team Surtees	Lola T70 Mk.3-Chevrolet	210 miles (340 km)	Can-Am	report
1968	(New Zealand) Denny Hulme	(United Kingdom) Bruce McLaren Motor Racing	McLaren M8A-Chevrolet	210 miles (340 km)	Can-Am	report

=== Trans-Am ===
Year	Driver	Entrant	Car	Distance/Duration	Report
1967	(United States) Mark Donohue	(United States) Roger Penske	Chevrolet Camaro	350 miles (560 km)	report

=== USAC Champ Car ===
Season	Date	Race Name	Winning driver	Chassis	Engine	Team	Report
1968	March 31	Stardust 150	(United States) Bobby Unser	Eagle	Ford	Leader Cards Racing	report

== Lap records ==
The fastest official lap records at Stardust International Raceway are listed as:

Category	Time	Driver	Vehicle	Event
Road Course (1965–1971): 3.000 mi (4.828 km)
Can-Am (Group 7)	1:30.950	Bruce McLaren	McLaren M6A	1968 Stardust Grand Prix
Group 4	1:35.700	John Surtees	Lola T70 Mk.2	1966 Stardust Grand Prix
Trans-Am	1:50.900	Jerry Titus	Ford Mustang	1967 Las Vegas Trans-Am round
