= Hiroshi Kazato =

Japanese racing driver

Hiroshi Kazato (風戸 裕, Kazato Hiroshi; born March 13, 1949, Chiba Prefecture, Japan; died June 2, 1974) was a Japanese racecar driver. Kazato started his career at the age of 19. He took part in the 1971 Can-Am season, finishing 10th in the championship driving a Lola T222-Chevrolet. He participated at Formula Two European seasons 1972 and 1973, scoring seven championship points. He graduated from Seikei University in 1973.

Kazato died at 25 years old at Fuji Speedway, during a Fuji Grand Champion series race after colliding with Seiichi Suzuki on the banking, resulting in the circuit being modified to eliminate the 30-degree banking, establishing the modern configuration with the hairpin that bypasses the banking.

== Resources ==
- Motorsport Memorial
