= Shadow DN4 =

American sports prototype racing cars

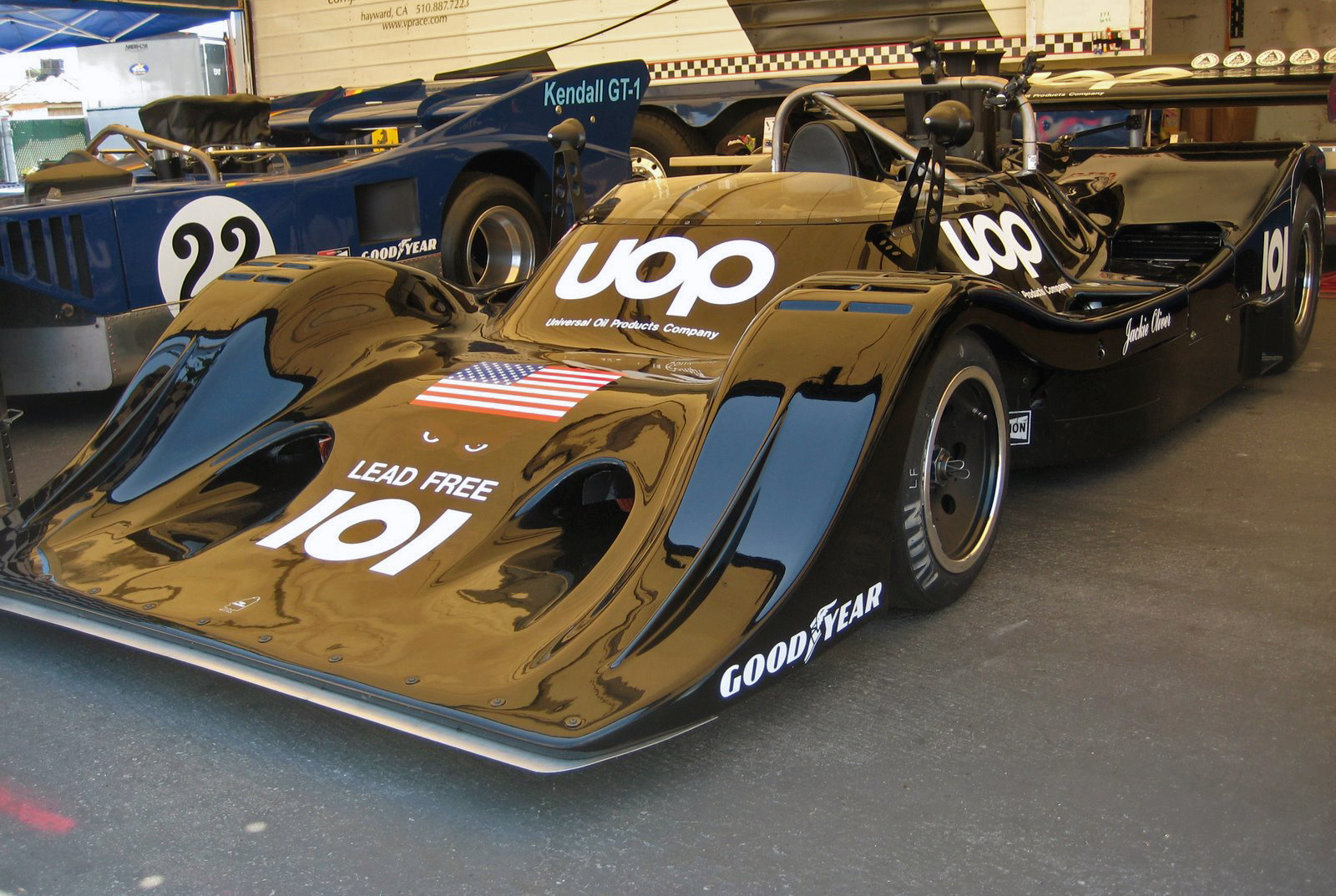
- Category: Can-Am (Group 7)
- Constructor: Shadow
- Designer: Tony Southgate
- Predecessor: Shadow DN2

Technical specifications
- Chassis: Aluminum fiberglass monocoque
- Suspension (front): Double wishbone, Coil springs over Damper, Anti-roll bar
- Suspension (rear): Twin lower links, Single upper links, Twin trailing-arms, Coil springs over Shock absorbers, Anti-roll bar
- Length: 180 in (457.2 cm)
- Width: 80 in (203.2 cm)
- Wheelbase: 105 in (2,667.0 mm)
- Engine: Chevrolet 7,439–8,112 cc (454–495 cu in) V8 engine naturally-aspirated mid-engined
- Transmission: Hewland LG-500 4-speed manual
- Power: 745–850 hp (556–634 kW)
- Weight: 1,860 lb (843.7 kg)
- Tyres: Firestone

Competition history
- Notable entrants: Phoenix Racing Organizations
- Notable drivers: (United Kingdom) Jackie Oliver (United States) George Follmer
- Debut: 1974 Can-Am Mosport
Races	Wins
5	4
- Teams' Championships: 1: (Phoenix Racing Organizations)
- Constructors' Championships: 1: Shadow
- Drivers' Championships: 1: 1974 Can-Am (Jackie Oliver)

The Shadow DN4 is a sports prototype race car, built to Group 7 racing specifications, for competition in the Can-Am series, and later the World Sportscar Championship, in 1974 and 1976. Jackie Oliver successfully clinched 1974 Can-Am Championship season in this car, winning 4 out of the 5 races that season. In 2025, it raced at the Goodwood Festival of Speed, and completed the Hillclimb track in 47.88 seconds.
