= Dave Billes =

Canadian racing driver (1938–2023)

- Born: David George Billes; November 18, 1938
- Died: January 21, 2023 (aged 84)
- Spouse: Donna Geraldine Siemms (m. 1963; d. 2020)
- Children: 3
- Parents: Alfred Jackson Billes (father); Muriel Billes (mother)

David George Billes, popularly known as Dave Billes (November 18, 1938 - January 21, 2023), was a Canadian racing driver. He was Jacques Villeneuve (elder)'s car owner in CART IndyCar competition in the early 1980s and entered two cars in the 1985 Indianapolis 500.

He was inducted into the Canadian Motorsport Hall of Fame in 1994.

== IndyCar win ==
#	Season	Date	Sanction	Track / Race	No.	Winning driver	Chassis	Engine	Tire	Grid	Laps Led
1	1985	August 4	CART	Road America (R)	76	(Canada) Jacques Villeneuve (Sr.)	March 85C	Cosworth DFX V8t	Goodyear	4	14
