= Lola T220 =

Lola T220 Lola T222
- Category: Group 7 Can-Am
- Constructor: Lola
- Predecessor: Lola T160
- Successor: Lola T260

Technical specifications
- Chassis: fibreglass body on aluminium monocoque
- Suspension (front): double wishbones, coil springs over dampers, anti-roll bar
- Suspension (rear): double wishbones, coil springs over dampers, anti-roll bar
- Wheelbase: 98 in (248.9 cm)
- Engine: Chevrolet 494–509 cu in (8,095–8,341 cc) V8 engine naturally-aspirated mid-engined
- Transmission: Hewland Mk.6 4/5-speed manual
- Power: 740–895 hp (552–667 kW)
- Weight: 794 kg (1,750.5 lb)

Competition history
- Debut: 1971 Can-Am Mosport Park

The Lola T220, and its evolution, the Lola T222, are Group 7 sports prototype race cars, designed, developed, and built by the British manufacturer and constructor Lola, to compete in the Can-Am championship from the 1971 season. It also took part in the European Interserie championship.

== Design ==
The T222s were all powered by a naturally aspirated Chevrolet V8 but in different displacements. The individual specimens underwent changes in displacement in their competitive life. The engine was a Chevrolet V8. Centrally mounted, it operated a 5-speed Hewland MK6 manual transmission. Traction was rear. The chassis was an aluminum monocoque and the fiberglass bodywork was. The T220 shared the chassis with the Lola T222. Damaged T220s were often repaired with pieces of T222.

== History ==
Among the best results was a third place at the Hockenheimring, in the third round of the 1971 Interserie championship. T222 chassis number # HU04 was driven by Vic Elford, who finished behind Leo Kinnunen, second in the Porsche 917 Spyder and Derek Bell, first in McLaren M8E. At the next round of the Interserie, the Norisring 200 Miglia, the same T222 again obtained third place. This time under the command of Jo Bonnier, who came behind Peter Gethin, second, and Chris Craft, first, both in McLaren M8E.
