= Lola T160 =

Lola T160 Lola T165
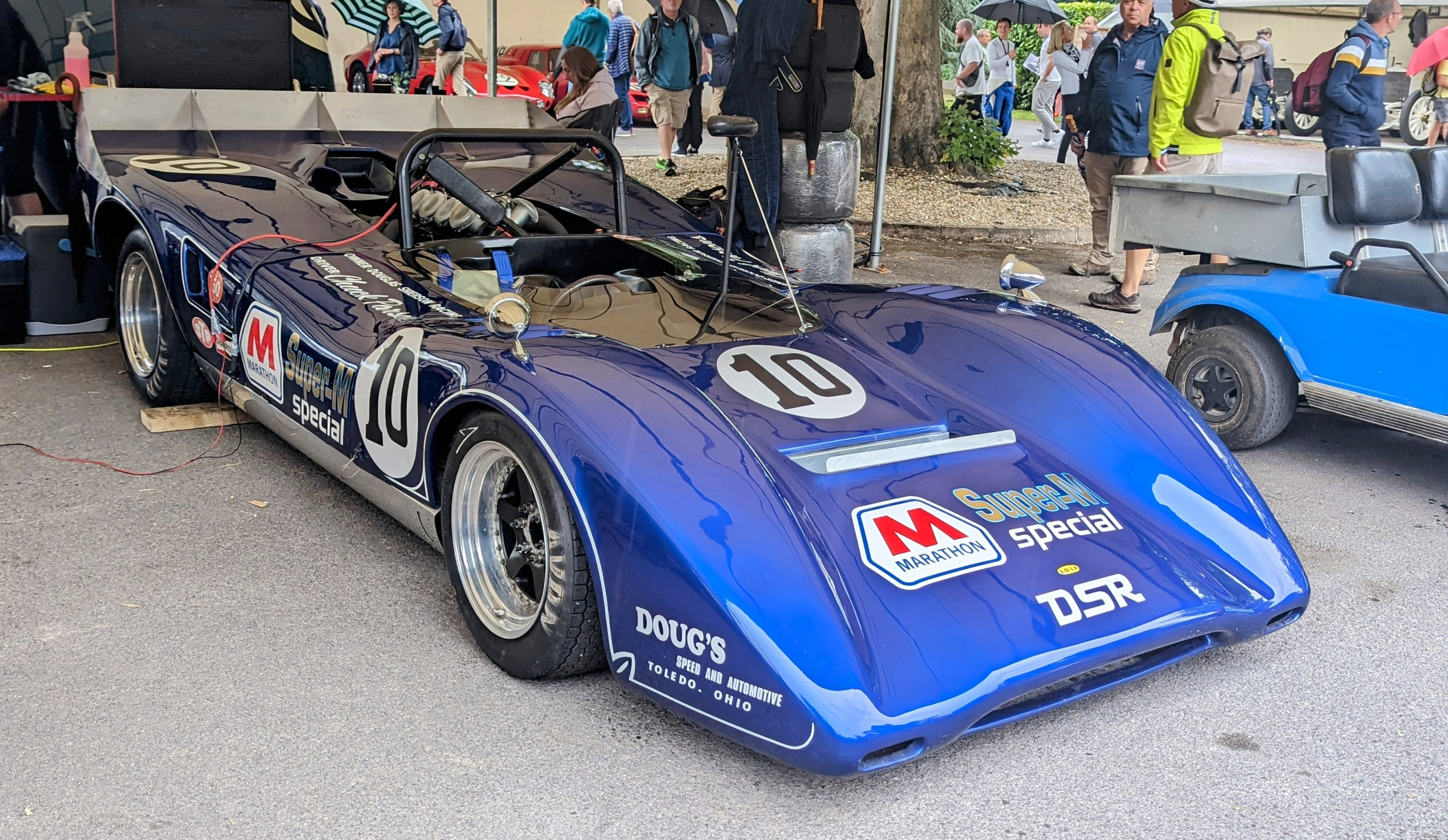
- The 1968 model 160/9 was sold new to Carl Haas Racing in the US. Here at Goodwood Festival of Speed 2023
- Category: Group 7 Can-Am
- Constructor: Lola
- Designer: Eric Broadley
- Predecessor: Lola T70
- Successor: Lola T220

Technical specifications
- Chassis: fiberglass-reinforced body on aluminum monocoque
- Suspension (front): double wishbones, coil springs over shock absorbers, anti-roll bar
- Suspension (rear): reversed lower wishbones, top links, trailing arms, coil springs over shock absorbers
- Length: 196 in (497.8 cm)
- Width: 72 in (182.9 cm)
- Height: 37.4 in (95.0 cm)
- Axle track: 54–56 in (137.2–142.2 cm) (front); 51–54 in (129.5–137.2 cm) (rear)
- Wheelbase: 94–95 in (238.8–241.3 cm)
- Engine: Ford or Chevrolet 427–510 cu in (6,997–8,357 cc) V8 engine naturally-aspirated mid-engined
- Transmission: Hewland Mk.6/LG600 4-speed manual
- Power: 560–900 hp (418–671 kW); 550–840 lb⋅ft (746–1,139 N⋅m)
- Weight: 1,477–1,950 lb (670.0–884.5 kg)

Competition history
- Debut: 1968 USRRC Mexico City

The Lola T160, and its evolution, the Lola T165, is a series of purpose-built Group 7 sports prototype race cars, designed and developed by British chassis manufacturer Lola Cars, specifically to compete in the Can-Am series in 1968.

The T160 was the successor to the competitive T70, sharing similar design and roots. Lola built the chassis, constructed out of fiberglass, and molded it into an aluminum monocoque body. This meant the car was lightweight, weighing only 670 kg (1,480 lb). The chassis was designed to accept a small-block engine, but most cars were powered by either the Chevrolet ZL1 or the Ford FE "big-blocks", generating about 625–750 hp (466–559 kW); mated to a 4-speed or 5-speed Hewland L.G.500 or L.G.600 manual transmission. This made the cars very fast, with a notably excellent power-to-weight ratio. It was used in active competition until 1971, and was succeeded and used alongside the new T220 in 1970.
