= Lothar Motschenbacher =

German retired racing driver (b. 1938)

- Born: 19 November 1938 Cologne, Germany

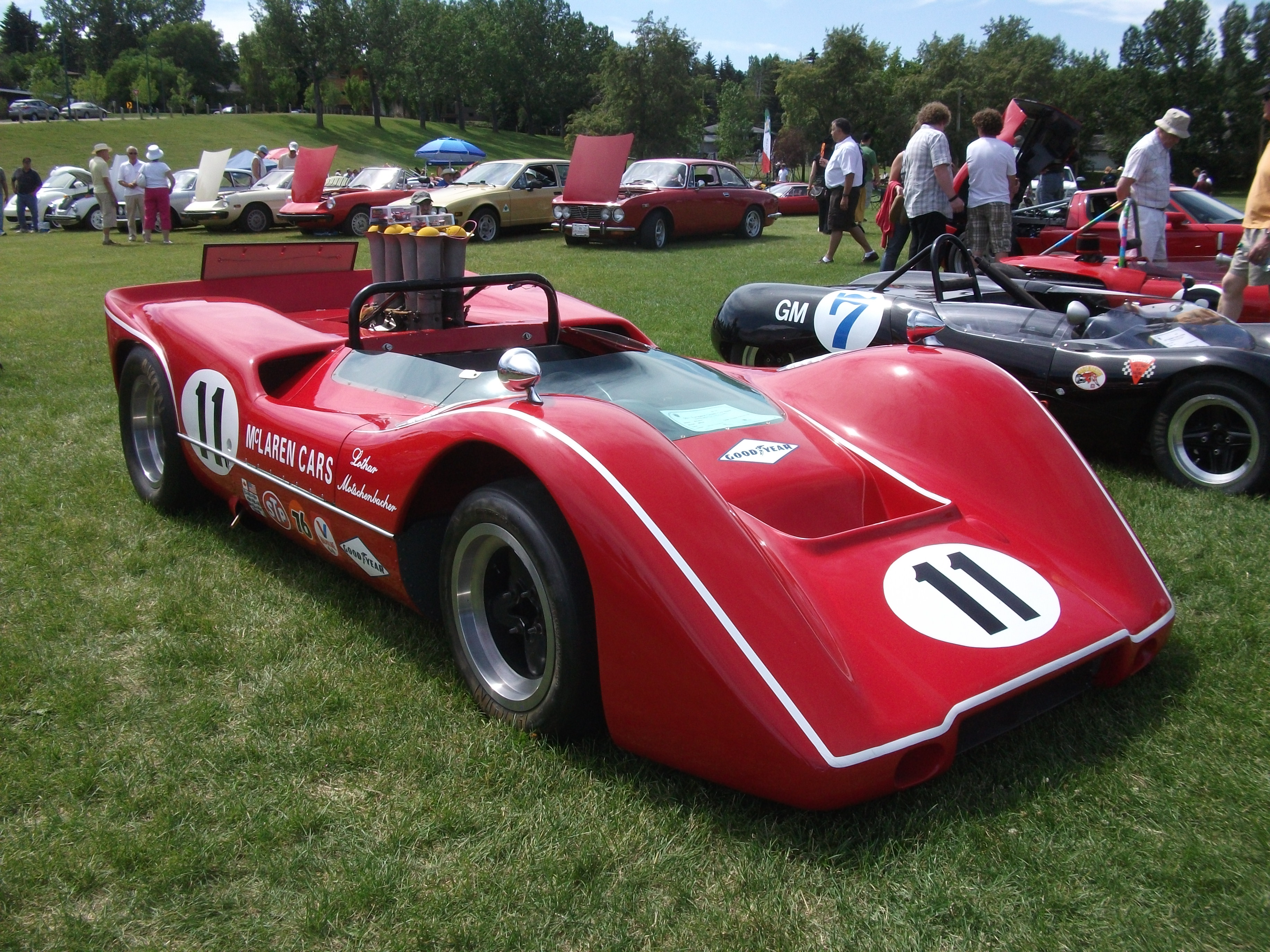
Motschenbacher's McLaren M6

Lothar Motschenbacher (born 19 November 1938) is a retired racing driver, best known for his appearances in the Can-Am Challenge Cup series.

== Career ==
Motschenbacher had been an apprentice at Mercedes-Benz until 1958, when, aged 19, he emigrated to the United States of America. His racing career began on the West Coast in the 1960s, in Formula Junior cars (Dolphin and Lotus 22), at one point winning 15 consecutive races, and overall winning 34 times in 54 races. In 1965, by which time he was based at Van Nuys, California, he traded up to a Ford-Cobra in the United States Road Racing Championship, and in 1966 took his first win in the series, at Mid-Ohio, driving a McLaren-Elva for Dan Blocker.

=== Can-Am ===
Motschenbacher joined the Can-Am series on its start in 1966, and was a consistent entrant until 1974, always accompanied by his wife Marilyn, and running in more Can-Am races than anyone else; indeed, the first race he missed was at Elkhart Lake in 1972, due to an injury sustained in a Formula 5000 race. Apart from a season in a Lola T70 in 1967, he always ran his own McLarens, for which he had become an agent; in 1968 he switched his operation base to Beverly Hills. He never won a race, his best result being a 2nd at Ste Jovite in 1970, eleven seconds behind Dan Gurney in a works car. However his consistent finishes earned him the runner-up spot in the 1970 Can-Am championship.

=== Single-seaters ===
In 1967 and 1968 he had four races in the USAC Championship Car series, scoring points twice, thanks to a 9th at Phoenix International Raceway in Kenny Brenn's Gerhardt-Offenhauser in the former year, and 6th at St Jovite in a Watson-Offenhauser in the latter. He was entered by Ken Brenn for the 1967 Indianapolis 500, but on 4 May the United States Automobile Club banned him and Peter Revson for 60 days, for taking part in a USRRC race at Las Vegas instead of a USAC race at Trenton, New Jersey.

In 1969, he bought the first Eagle with support from the Leader Card Racers team, with a view to taking part in the 1969 Indianapolis 500, but USAC banned him again from taking part, because he had taken part in two races in the 1969 SCCA Continental Championship (for Formula A cars). He sold the car to Jerry Hansen. Motschenbacher's Formula A season (in a McLaren M10A) had started with a second place at Riverside, but he only scored one more point all season, and sold it on before the season's end.

In 1971, he returned to Formula 5000, finishing 9th the SCCA championship driving a McLaren M18; the following season he improved to 7th in the same car. His run in the formula ended with an accident at the end of the Road Atlanta race in 1972, when he (and a number of other drivers) were caught out by a shower at the first turn; although he was classified 6th, the M18's tub was too damaged to repair.

=== Other formulae ===
Lothar Motschenbacher

NASCAR Cup Series career
- 1 race run over 1 year
- Best finish: ineligible for points
- First race: 1970 Motor Trend 500 (Riverside Raceway)
- Last race: 1970 Motor Trend 500 (Riverside Raceway)
Wins	Top tens	Poles
0	0	0

Motschenbacher continued in the USRRC in 1967, winning at Laguna Seca, and occasionally took part in World Sportscar Championship races. With Ed Leslie he finished 2nd in the 1969 24 Hours of Daytona, driving a Lola T70 for James Garner's AIR team; Garner bemoaned that an issue clearing a clogged radiator cost the team too much time in the pits to challenge for victory. He also came 4th in the 1971 6 Hours of Watkins Glen (3rd in class) with Alain de Cadenet in Ecurie Francorchamps' Ferrari 512M (de Cadenet using it in the Can-Am race the following day).

Motschenbacher was the first German to take part in the NASCAR Grand National series, entering the 1970 Motor Trend 500 at Riverside in a Chevrolet Biscayne, the track's licensing allowing those with international licences to take part without needing NASCAR approval. The attempt was not successful, the Biscayne giving out after 7 laps.

=== End of career ===
On 23 November 1972, Motschenbacher was working on a custom car in his Newport Beach garage, when an explosion - put down to the car backfiring as he fired it up, and setting light to inflammable material - gave him first and second degree burns, and destroyed the garage. The fire destroyed his Can-Am cars, and, lacking insurance to cover their cost, was unable to replace them; unable to rebuild his garage, he instead opened up a Mercedes-Benz garage in Santa Ana in early 1973. He was eventually able to obtain an old McLaren M8F take part in a handful of Can-Am races in 1973 and 1974 to end his career.

== Lawsuit ==
Motschenbacher's Can-Am cars were distinctive; always in red, with white pinstriping, and the number 11 in ovals at the front and on the sides. In 1970 the R. J. Reynolds Tobacco Company produced a television advertisement for Winston cigarettes, which used a stock image of Motschenbacher's car, but the number altered to 71. Motschenbacher sued, on the basis that this was a barely-disguised misappropriation of his identity under California law, and he finally succeeded before the United States Court of Appeals for the Ninth Circuit.

== Private life ==
During his racing career, Motschenbacher was married to Marilyn, née Fox, a former race queen, who performed the roles of team and pit manager.

== Results ==
(key) (Races in bold indicate pole position, races in italics indicate fastest race lap)

=== USAC Championship Car ===
Year	Entrant	Car	1	2	3	4	5	6	7	8	9	10	11	12	13	14	15	16	17	18	19	20	21	22	23	24	25	26	27	28	Pos	Points
1967	Ken Brenn	Gerhardt	PHX; 9	TRE; DNQ	INDY; DNP	MIL	LAN	PIP	MOS	MOS	IRP	LAN	MTR	MTR	SPR	MIL	DUQ	ISF	TRE	SAC	HAN	PHX									49th	60
1967	Harrison	Eisert																					RIV; 28								49th	60
1968	Zecol-Lubaid	Watson	HAN	LVG	PHX	TRE	INDY	MIL	MOS	MOS	LAN	PIP	CDR	NAZ	IRP	IRP	LAN	LAN	MTR; 17	MTR; 6	SPR	MIL	DUQ	ISF	TRE	SAC	MCH	HAN	PHX	RIV	44th	80
1969	Leader Cards Racers	Eagle	PHX1	HAN	INDY; DNP	MIL1	LAN	PIP	CDR	NAZ	TRE1	IRP1	IRP2	MIL2	SPR	DIS	DQSF	ISF	BRN1	BRN1	TRE2	SAC	KEN1	KEN2	PHX2	RIV					-	0

=== Formula A/5000 SCCA Continental Championship results ===
Year	Team	Car	1	2	3	4	5	6	7	8	9	10	11	12	13	Rank	Points
1969	Motschenbacher	McLaren M10A	RIV; 2	LS; 15	CDR; 6	SON; DNS	SEA; 14	ROA	LRP1	BIR; 28	MOS	LRP; DNA	TRE; 11	THO	SEB	11th	7
1971	Motschenbacher	McLaren M18	RIV	LS	SEA	MOH	ROA; DNS	EDM; 6	BIR; 6	LRP; 8						9th	26
1972	Motschenbacher	McLaren M18	LS; 4	SEA; 20	WGI; 2	ROA; 10	BRA; DNA	ATL; 6	LRP; DNA	RIV						7th	32

== External sites ==
- Sports car and Can-Am results
