= Edmonton International Speedway =

Motor raceway in Edmonton, Alberta

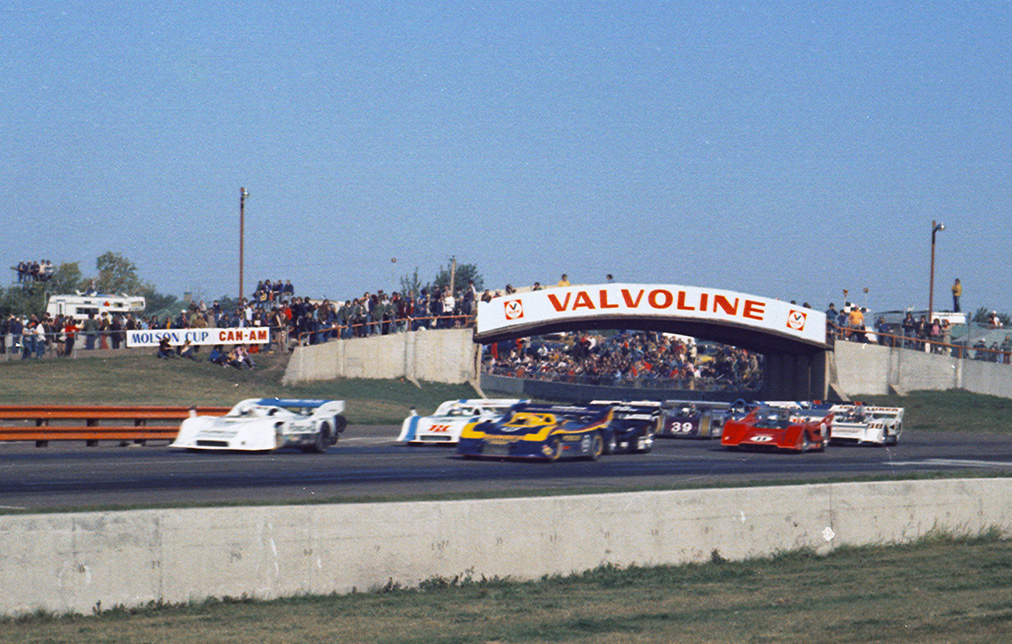
- September 1973 Can-Am race
- Location: Edmonton, Alberta, Canada
- Coordinates: 53°36′25″N 113°33′25″W
- Capacity: 30,000
- Opened: 1966
- Closed: 1982
- Former names: Speedway Park
- Major events: Can-Am (1968–1973, 1981); Formula Atlantic (1971–1977, 1981); Trans-Am (1971, 1973); SCCA Continental 5000 Championship (1970–1972)

Road Course (1966-1982)
- Length: 4.067 km (2.527 mi)
- Turns: 14
- Race lap record: 1:20.403 ( (United States) Mark Donohue, Porsche 917/30 TC, 1973, Group 7)

Short Oval (1966-1982)
- Length: 0.402 km (0.250 mi)

Dragstrip (1966-1982)
- Length: 0.402 km (0.250 mi)

Edmonton International Speedway, also known as Speedway Park, was a 251-acre (1.02 km^{2}) multi-track auto racing facility located in the present Cumberland and Hudson neighbourhoods of Edmonton, Alberta, Canada. The facility featured a 0.250 mi (0.402 km) dragstrip, a 4.067 km (2.527 mi) 14-turn road course, and a 0.250 mi (0.402 km) short oval. At its peak, it had capacity for over 30,000 fans.

== History ==
In the late 1940s, the dirt-surfaced Breckenridge Oval opened on the site. In 1952, the oval was shortened and paved as a 1/4-mile asphalt oval, and the 8,000-seat facility was renamed Speedway Park.

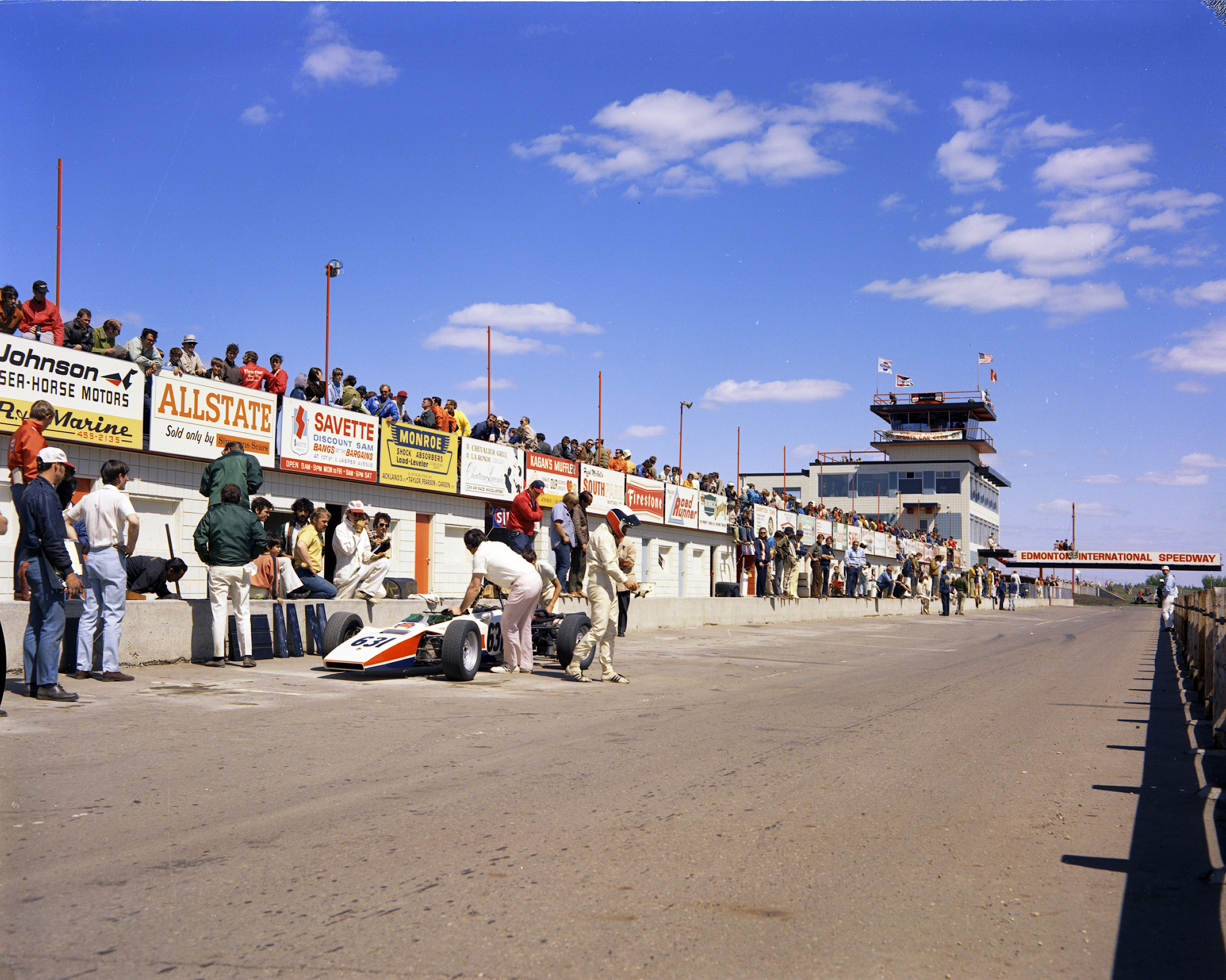
May 1970 Formula A race at the Edmonton International Speedway

In 1967, the 0.250 mi (0.402 km) drag strip opened and had a full length of 1,330 m (4,350 ft). In 1968, the road course opened in time for the first Can-Am race. Over the years, the facility also hosted Formula Atlantic, Formula 1600, Formula 5000, Trans-Am, as well as NHRA-sanctioned drag racing.

Qualico Developments was the land owner in the latter years. The track closed in 1982, after the area was annexed by the City of Edmonton. Qualico then converted the land to housing. Edmonton would be without any form of professional racing until Capital City Raceway Park opened in 1991.

== In popular culture ==
David Cronenberg's movie, Fast Company (1979), was primarily filmed at Edmonton International Speedway.

== Major Series ==
=== Can-Am ===
- The thunderous Can-Am series raced in Edmonton from 1968-1973, where the race was known as the Klondike 200, and the primary sponsor was Molson Brewery.
- Denny Hulme won all four races from 1968 to 1971, while Mark Donohue won the 1972 and 1973 races driving a Porsche 917 for Roger Penske.
- Other well-known Can-Am drivers that raced at EIS included Bruce McLaren, Jackie Stewart, Peter Revson, Jacky Ickx, and Danny Sullivan.

=== Formula 5000 ===
- The Canadian Road Racing Championship raced F5000 cars twice at EIS:
  - June 22, 1969 (Winner: Eppie Wietzes, Lola)
  - June 14, 1970 (Winner: Eppie Wietzes, McLaren)
- The Sports Car Club of America (SCCA) raced F5000 cars three times at EIS:
  - May 24, 1970 (Winner: Ron Grable, Lola)
  - August 1, 1971 (Winner: David Hobbs, McLaren)
  - June 4, 1972 (Winner: David Hobbs, Lola)
- When the SCCA put full-bodies on F5000 cars and called them Can Am cars, this series raced once at EIS:
  - August 16, 1981 (Winner: Geoff Brabham, VDS)

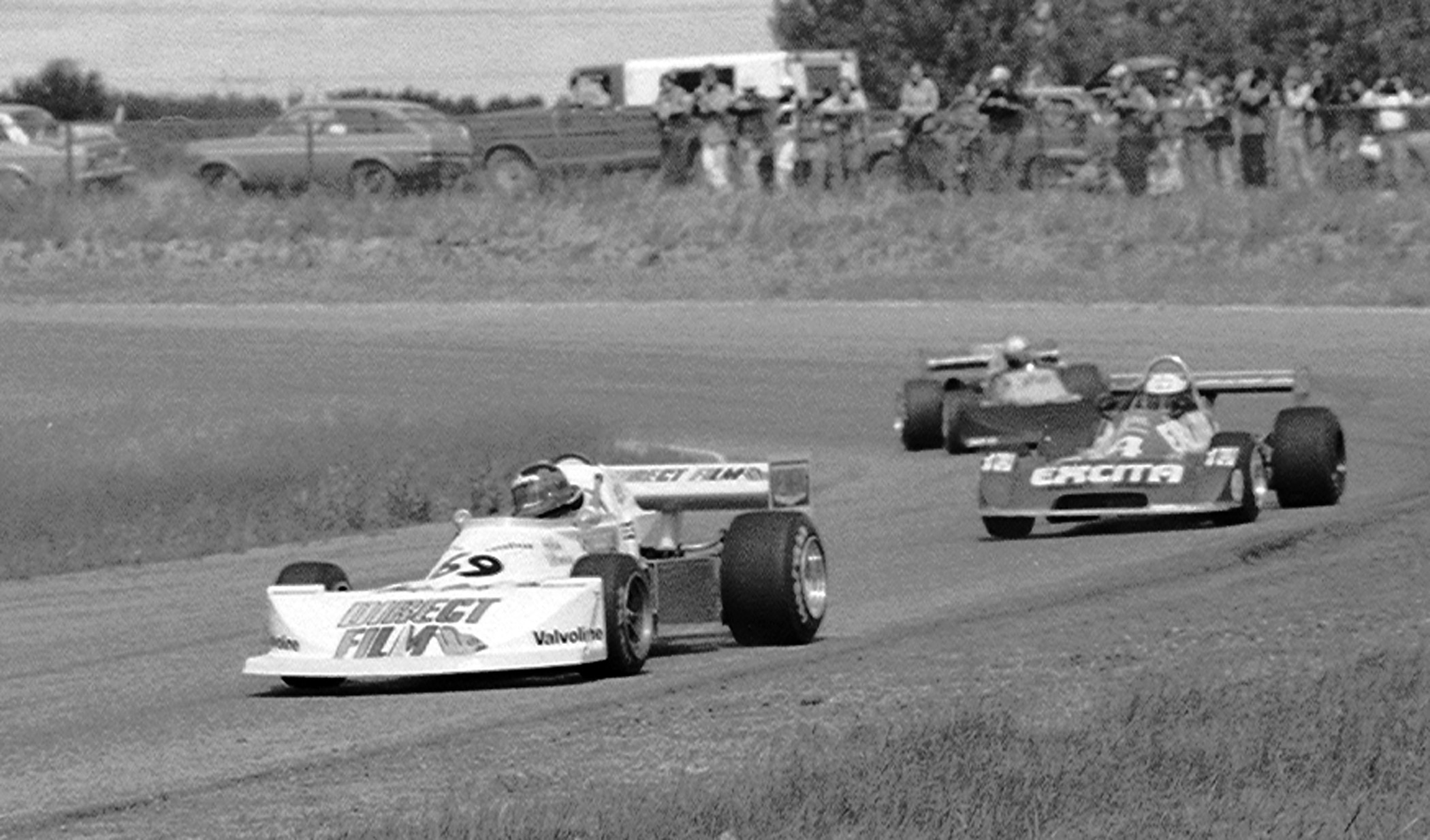
Gilles Villeneuve and Keke Rosberg at Edmonton International Speedway Formula Atlantic race, 1977.

=== Formula Atlantic ===
- Formula Atlantic was originally called Formula B, and as FB it raced in Edmonton three times:
  - June 20, 1971 (Winner: Jacques Couture, Lotus)
  - June 25, 1972 (Winner: Ric Forrest, March)
  - July 3, 1973 (Winner: Alan Lader)
- The speedway brought in the Formula Atlantic series from 1974–1977, and again in 1981:
  - June 2, 1974 (Winner: Bill Brack, Lotus)
  - May 24, 1975 (Winner: Bertil Roos, March)
  - May 16, 1976 (Winner: Gilles Villeneuve, March)
  - July 3, 1977 (Winner: Gilles Villeneuve, March)
  - August 15, 1981 (Winner: Tim Coconis, Ralt)
- Other well-known Atlantic drivers that raced at EIS include Bobby Rahal, Keke Rosberg, Elliott Forbes-Robinson, Kevin Cogan, and Howdy Holmes.

=== Trans-Am ===
- The SCCA's Trans-Am series raced at EIS twice:
  - June 20, 1971 (Winner: Mark Donohue, AMC Javelin)
  - August 19, 1973 (Winner: John Greenwood, Chevrolet Corvette)

== Lap records ==
The fastest official race lap records at Edmonton International Speedway are listed as:

Category	Time	Driver	Vehicle	Event
Road Course (1966–1982): 4.067 km (2.527 mi)
Group 7	1:20.403	Mark Donohue	Porsche 917/30 TC	1973 Molson Cup Can-Am
Can-Am	1:22.106	Teo Fabi	March 817	1981 Letheridge Brewery Can-Am Edmonton
F5000	1:23.900	Brett Lunger	Lola T300	1972 Player's Continental
Trans-Am (TO)	1:35.869	John Greenwood	Chevrolet Corvette	1973 Edmonton Trans-Am round
Trans-Am (TU)	1:47.400	John Morton	Datsun 510	1971 Edmonton Trans-Am round
Group 5	1:49.100	Bob Stevens	Chevrolet Camaro	1968 Edmonton Main Race
Sports car	1:53.000	Mike Atkin	Merlyn-Ford	1968 Edmonton Preliminary
Group 3	1:58.700	Bruce Berry (Note: Both drivers took the same lap time independently in different races.); Jake Rempel	Lotus Elan; Sunbeam Tiger	1968 Edmonton Production race 1968 Edmonton Consolation race

== See also ==
- List of auto racing tracks in Canada
