= Lola T260 =

- Category: Group 7 Can-Am
- Constructor: Lola
- Designer(s): Eric Broadley
- Predecessor: Lola T220

Technical specifications
- Chassis: fiberglass-reinforced body on aluminum monocoque
- Suspension (front): double wishbones, coil springs over shock absorbers, anti-roll bar
- Suspension (rear): double wishbones, coil springs over shock absorbers, anti-roll bar
- Length: 139 in (353.1 cm)
- Width: 76 in (193.0 cm)
- Height: 37 in (94.0 cm) (39 in (99.1 cm) to top of roll bar)
- Axle track: 58 in (147.3 cm) (front and rear)
- Wheelbase: 98 in (248.9 cm)
- Engine: Chevrolet 494 cu in (8,095 cc) V8 engine naturally-aspirated mid-engined
- Transmission: Hewland 4-speed manual
- Power: 760 hp (570 kW)
- Weight: 725 kg (1,598.4 lb)
- Tires: Goodyear

Competition history
- Debut: 1971 Can-Am Mosport Park

The Lola T260 is a Group 7 sports prototype race car, designed, developed, and built by the British manufacturer and constructor Lola, under the leadership and guidance of Eric Broadley, to compete in the North American Can-Am championship from the 1971 season.
