= John Cordts =

Canadian racing driver (1935–2026)

- Born: 23 July 1935; Hamburg, Germany
- Died: 24 October 2026 (aged 91); Ladysmith, British Columbia, Canada

Formula One World Championship career
- Nationality: Canadian
- Active years: 1969
- Team: privateer Brabham
- Entries: 1
- Championships: 0
- Wins: 0
- Podiums: 0
- Career points: 0
- Pole positions: 0
- Fastest laps: 0
- First entry: 1969 Canadian Grand Prix

John Cordts (23 July 1935 – 24 October 2026) was a Canadian racing driver who raced in Formula One and North American sports car racing.

Cordts participated in one Formula One World Championship Grand Prix, the 1969 Canadian Grand Prix on 20 September 1969. He qualified 19th, but retired his Brabham after ten laps with an oil leak, while in 16th place.

In addition to his Formula One appearance, Cordts had been successful in Canadian and U.S. sports car racing, particularly with various McLarens run by Dave Billes's Performance Engineering. He competed in many events, ranging from Harewood Acres (where he still holds the track record when it closed in 1970), Mosport, Mont-Tremblant, and Westwood in Canada to various tracks in the US and even Japan. He later became a regular participant in the CanAm series, in which he raced until 1974, mainly in McLarens and Lolas. His best Can-Am finish was second at Road America in 1974. He was also known for his participation in the SCCA Trans-Am Series, where he had, at one point, piloted a BF Goodrich-sponsored Pontiac Firebird, known as the "Tirebird" and also several FIA events with the Greenwood Corvette team.

He was inducted into the Canadian Motorsport Hall of Fame in 2003.

== Background ==
Born in Hamburg, Germany, Cordts emigrated to Sweden at the age of two with his family. He emigrated to Canada when he was in his early twenties to North Bay, Ontario, with his wife, Inga-Britt, and his one-year-old son, Jimmy. His two other children, Mary and Johnny, were born in Canada and moved to Sweden with their mother.

Cordts retired to a private life in Western Canada where he was well known for his wood carvings, and later wrote his autobiography entitled "Blood, Sweat and Turnips". He died in Ladysmith, British Columbia on Vancouver Island on 24 October 2026, at the age of 91.

== Complete Formula One World Championship results ==
(key)

Year	Entrant	Chassis	Engine	1	2	3	4	5	6	7	8	9	10	11	WDC	Points
1969	Paul Seitz	Brabham BT23B	Climax Straight-4	RSA	ESP	MON	NED	FRA	GBR	GER	ITA	CAN; Ret	USA	MEX	NC	0

== Sources ==
- "The Grand Prix Who's Who", Steve Small, 1995.
- "Blood, Sweat and Turnips", John Cordts, 2006.
