= History of the Trans-Am Series =

Sports car racing series history

- Category: Sports car racing
- Country: United States
- Inaugural season: 1966
- Official website: www.gotransam.com

The Trans-Am Series is an automobile racing series created in 1966.

== History ==
The Trans-Am Series is an automobile racing series that was created in 1966 by Sports Car Club of America (SCCA) President John Bishop. Originally known as the Trans-American Sedan Championship, the name was changed to the Trans-American Championship for 1967 and henceforth. The series has in fact gone by a variety of different names through the years, some linked to sponsors, some not. It has evolved over time from its original format as a Manufacturers' Championship series for modified passenger sedans and Coupés to its current form as a Drivers' / Manufacturers' Championship Series that is open to GT style racecars. Champion drivers have been officially recognized, and Drivers' Championship(s) have been awarded since the 1972 season.

The series was formed at the dawn of the pony car era, and was derived from the SCCA's A & B Sedan amateur Club Racing classes, Early Trans-Am Series racecars were just modified production cars. The series was open to FIA Group 2 Touring Cars, and it featured two classes: "Over 2.0 Liter"—111 inch wheel base or less and engine displacement limited to 5.0 liters / 305 cubic inches (primarily American pony cars), and "Under 2.0 Liter" (predominantly European sedans), with both classes running together.

The series was best known for competition among American V8 coupes such as the Ford Mustang, Chevrolet Camaro, Plymouth Barracuda, Mercury Cougar, AMC Javelin, Pontiac Firebird, and Dodge Challenger in the 1960s and early 1970s, driven by some of the most famous names in auto racing, like Mark Donohue, Parnelli Jones, Dan Gurney, Sam Posey and Bob Tullius, to name just a few. Marques such as Porsche (until its 911 was reclassified as a sports car and not a sedan), Alfa Romeo, BMW, Datsun, Mini Cooper, Saab, and Volkswagen competed in the series' Under 2.0 Liter category.

Over the years, the series has raced on a variety of different types of race tracks (Permanent and temporary road courses / street circuits / airport circuits) all over the country, as well as at venues in Canada, Mexico, and even San Juan, Puerto Rico in 2003. Since 2015, Trans Am has been a national series (Continental U.S. only), racing at tracks primarily throughout the East Coast, South, and Midwest. Since the 2017 season, the stand-alone West Coast Championship Series has raced at four tracks—three on the West Coast, and one in Texas that is a 'shared event' with the Trans Am Championship Series. Each Championship Series is independent of the other, but both are run according to virtually identical rule books.

=== Beginnings (1966–1967) ===
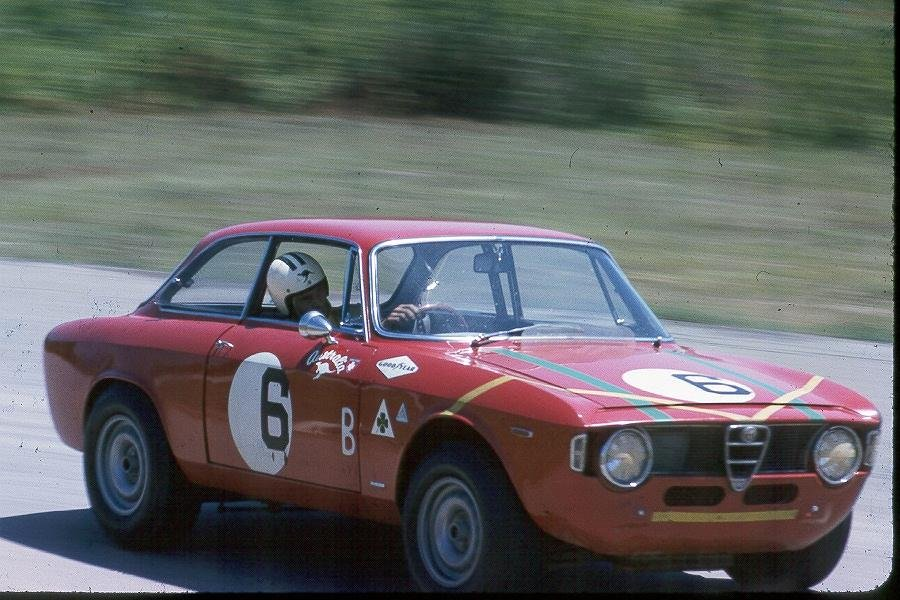
Kwech / Andrey 1966 Trans-Am Championship Alfa Romeo GTA

The Trans-American Sedan Championship commenced on March 25, 1966, at Sebring International Raceway, beginning a seven race season. (After 1966, seasons would average 12 rounds until 1973) The overall win went to Jochen Rindt driving an Alfa Romeo GTA, a very successful car in Trans Am, until Porsche arrived. Bob Tullius (in a Dodge Dart) took second overall and first in the Over 2.0 Liter class.

Allan Moffat, in a 1600cc Lotus Cortina, won the third race at Bryar. Ford of Britain gave full factory support to the Alan Mann Lotus Cortinas. In 1966, the Over 2.0 Liter Manufacturers' Champion was Ford, with the Mustang of Tom Yeager and Bob Johnson scoring most of Ford's wins and points. The Under 2.0 Liter Manufacturers' Champion was Alfa Romeo, with Horst Kwech and Gaston Andrey's Alfa Romeo GTA scoring 39 of the 57 Manufacturers' points for Alfa.

For 1967, in the Over 2.0 Liter class, Ford edged out Mercury for its second Manufacturers' Championship. Porsche successfully lobbied the SCCA to reclassify the 911 as a sedan, and then went on to dominate the Under 2.0 Liter field, winning the first of ultimately three consecutive Manufacturers' Championships over Alfa Romeo. The second season would see the emergence of now familiar names like Mark Donohue (3 wins, 2 of them without a co-driver) and Dan Gurney.

=== Golden era (1968–1972) ===
The 1968 season was notable for the addition of the 12 Hours of Sebring and the 24 Hours of Daytona, the only year the Trans-American Championship featured those races. The '68 season also marked the first time the series ever left the United States, as the race at Mont-Tremblant, Quebec introduced Trans-American Championship racing to Canada. From 1969 on, co-drivers were not used, as most of the races were between 2.5 and 3 hours.

Penske Racing campaigned Chevrolet Camaro Z28s through 1969, and American Motors (AMC) Javelins in 1970 and 1971. Mark Donohue dominated the '68 season, winning 10 out of 12 races (only one of them with a co-driver), ultimately chalking up 29 race victories from 1967 to 1971, the last ten of them in a Javelin. He was instrumental in the Trans-Am Series becoming the greatest American Musclecar racing showdown there was in the late '60s and early '70s. After achieving so much success together and popularizing "Trans-Am" (Donohue in particular), Penske Racing and Mark Donohue both left the series after the '71 season.

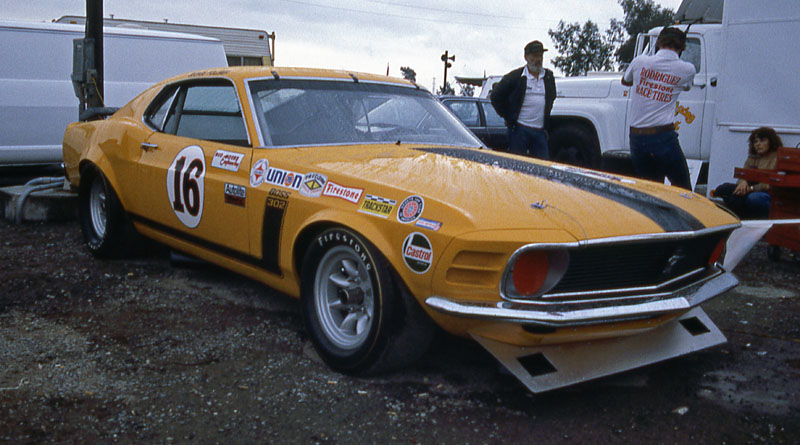
George Follmer's 1970 Boss 302 Mustang was identical to Parnelli Jones' #15

Mark Donohue made the Javelin a three-time winner in 1970, but five wins made it Parnelli Jones' greatest season ever, with Ford winning its first Manufacturers' title in two years. With Porsche's 911 moving to a 2.2L engine, 1970 also saw the resurgence of Alfa Romeo, dominating the Under 2 Liter class with a 9 win (out of 11) season. BMW picked up wins number one and two in the other races.

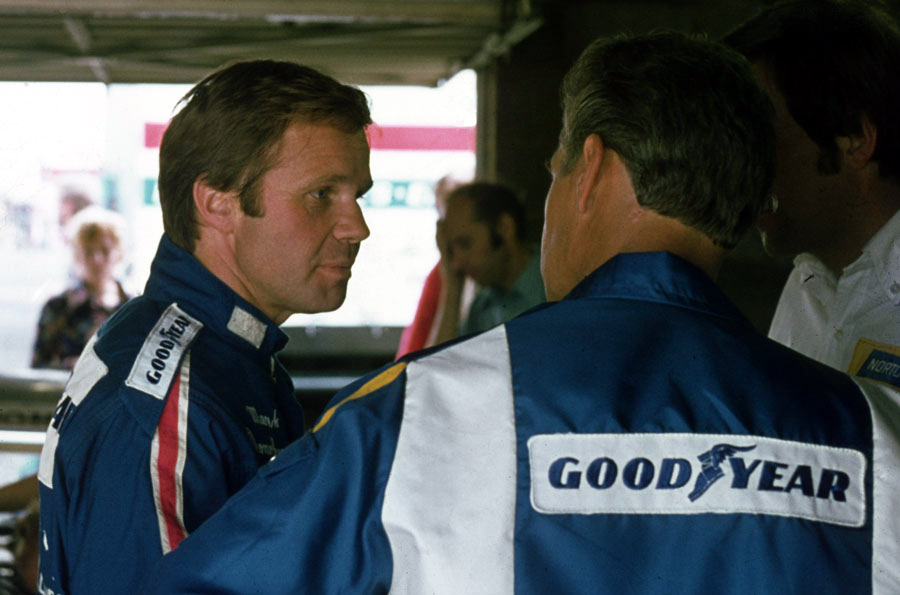
Penske Racing's Mark Donohue

As evidence of the original modified production car concept, a fan favorite in the 1971 Trans-American Championship was the "Grey Ghost", a 1964 Pontiac Tempest, prepared by Pontiac Special Projects Engineering Manager Herb Adams and a group of his young proteges: Tom Nell & Jeff Young (Engines), Joe Brady & Harry Quackenboss (Chassis), Ted Lambaris (Body), and Tom Goad (Logistics). The boxy, six year old Tempest had once been Adams' wife's daily driver, and had over 80,000 miles (130,000 km) on the odometer when it was turned into an A Sedan racer. It proved to be surprisingly fast, at a time when even a one year old car was considered out of step with the competition. And despite the big-name competition and factory supported race teams, it was entered in the opening round of the '71 Trans-Am Championship. Unable to qualify, the car was allowed to start at the rear of the field. With former winner Bob Tullius behind the wheel, it mowed through the field, and was running second behind eventual winner Mark Donohue's factory supported Penske Racing AMC Javelin when the engine expired. It was a very impressive performance for a boxy, six year old, converted 'grocery-getter' with no factory support.

In 1972, the series would begin officially awarding Drivers' Championships, with the first-ever titles going to George Follmer in an ex-Penske Roy Woods AMC Javelin, and John Morton in a Datsun 510, before changing back to a single class for the '73, '74, and '75 seasons. Had the Drivers' Championship been in place right from the start, Mark Donohue would have been the first back-to-back winner in 1968 and 1969, and also the first three-time winner.

The "Golden Era" is now celebrated in various historic racing events. A 2022 Jay Leno's Garage episode featured Trans-Am of the era. Mike Joy told Leno in 1990, twenty Trans-Am race cars from this era participated in a Historic Trans-Am event at Lime Rock Park. In 1992, Monterey Historics brought 20 such cars from the same era to their event at Sears Point International Raceway. Joy owns and drives a Jerry Thompson-driven No. 4 Owens Corning Camaro, whilst owning a Walter Parkins driven No. 17 Camaro that his son Scott drives at historic car events. Today, Historic Trans-Am celebrates the "Golden Era," with period-correct cars being raced at various circuits today.

==== "Two-Five Challenge" ====
For 1971 and 1972, the Under 2.0 Liter class' engine displacement limit was increased by 500cc to 2.5 Liters, and the classes renamed, with the "U2" class being renamed the "Two-Five Challenge". 1971 was very exciting as Horst Kwech, in a Herb Wetanson Alfa-Romeo GTV, and John Morton in Pete Brock's BRE Datsun 510, fought it out for the title. After a hard-fought season with much off-track puffing, Datsun won the first of their only two Manufacturers' Championships ever, but only after a tie-breaker (having more wins). In '72, Datsun would again defeat Alfa Romeo to win the Two-Five Challenge, and hence the title, this time convincingly. When these two marques dropped out after the 1972 season, interest in the series decreased. Already contributing to the Trans-Am Championship's decline was the dominance of AMC. Follmer and Donohue had switched to AMC in 1970, ending the Ford vs Chevy rivalry that had made the series famous.

=== Evolution (1973–1980) ===
1972 is considered to be the end of Trans-Am's "golden era". From 1973 onward, the Trans-Am Series would evolve into a lesser clone of the rival IMSA GT Championship: similarly modified cars, but with a more conventional focus. From the 1970s on, Trans-Am cars and/or drivers would also be seen running in the IMSA GT Championship. IMSA GT's focus on exotic cars such as Ferraris and Porsches provided a more adaptable format in comparison to Trans-Am's reliance on domestic performance sedans.

By the early '70s, insurance premiums for "muscle cars" had gotten to be extremely high, causing a significant sales decline. The 1973 oil crisis also hastened the demise of the "muscle car". This is generally considered to be the beginning of the decline of the Trans-Am Series. After 1972, there were a lot fewer races each season, with 1974 being the shortest Championship season ever at just 3 races. Seasons would start to lengthen again for good in the '80s.

During the 1973 through 1975 seasons, the series abandoned its two class format and went to a single class of competition, which proved to be a boon to both Peter Gregg and Porsche, winning two Championships apiece. John Greenwood and Chevrolet would 'rain on Peter Gregg's and Porsche's respective parades' in 1975.

The series revamped its class structure in 1975, using SCCA Club Racing's fastest production car classes as a basis for the new rules package. Also, beginning with the 1975 season, all races were approximately 100 miles in length, except for the Six Hours of Watkins Glen (1974-1980), and Trois-Rivieres (Various race lengths from 67.5 to 98.8 miles in 1976, 1979–1985, 1990–1999, 2002–2004, and 2011. See Trois-Rivieres for details) races.

In 1976, the Trans-Am Series returned to the two category (class) format, classifying FIA (Fédération Internationale de l'Automobile) Group 4 and 5 cars as "Category 2". This two class structure would remain in effect through the 1979 season, after which, the series went back to a single class until 2011, when the series was again divided into two classes; TA1 and TA2. The series would subsequently add even more classes, some of which would not be retained (GGT, TA3-A, TA3-I, and TA5), until arriving at the present 4 class structure.

In 1978, the series left the United States and Canada for the first time, with the last race of the season being run at the Autódromo Hermanos Rodríguez Grand Prix circuit in Mexico City, Mexico (Bob Tullius taking the win in a Jaguar XJS).

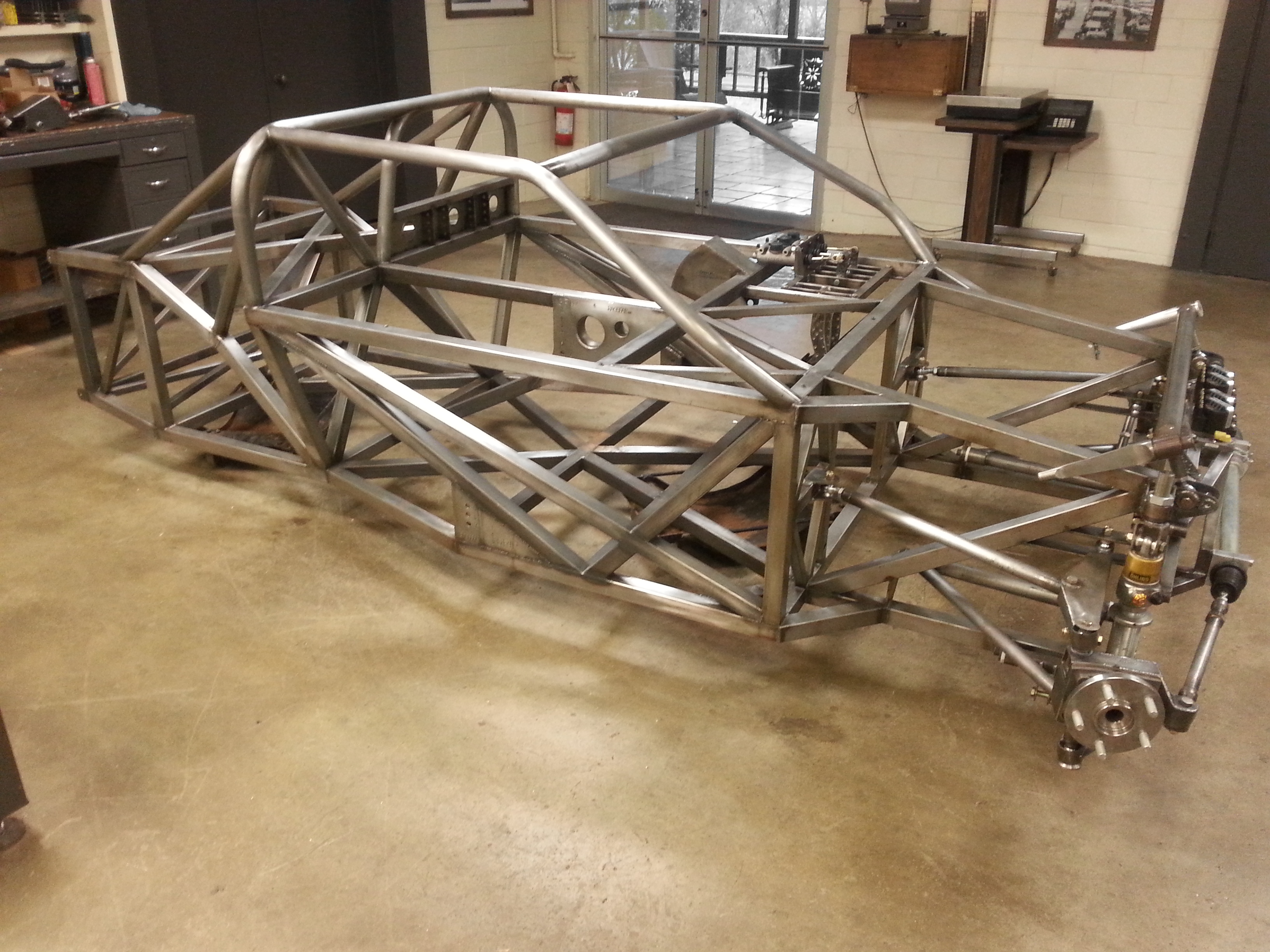
Typical example of a tube-frame made by Racefab Inc.

Trans-Am gradually evolved and adapted, eventually becoming a tube-frame / silhouette racing car series, instead of being production-based, as it was prior to 1973.

=== GT era: Big money, turbos, and cost escalation (1980–1988) ===
In 1980, the SCCA developed a weight-to-displacement ratio for handicapping cars. 5 Liter, 2600-pound vehicles dominated the field. Soon, tube-frame cars, often based upon commercially available and relatively inexpensive "short track" stock car chassis, would begin to appear, eventually becoming the standard for Trans-Am Series competitors. Turbocharged, small-displacement-engined cars would also appear and proliferate as the decade wore on.

Despite its name (which General Motors took from the series in 1969 without the SCCA's knowledge or consent), the Firebird Trans Am was not initially used in the Trans-Am Series, due to the fact that its smallest engine was larger than the SCCA's 5.0 Liter (305 cubic inches) limit. In 1982, with Elliott Forbes-Robinson behind the wheel, a Pontiac would win the series Championship for the first and only time.

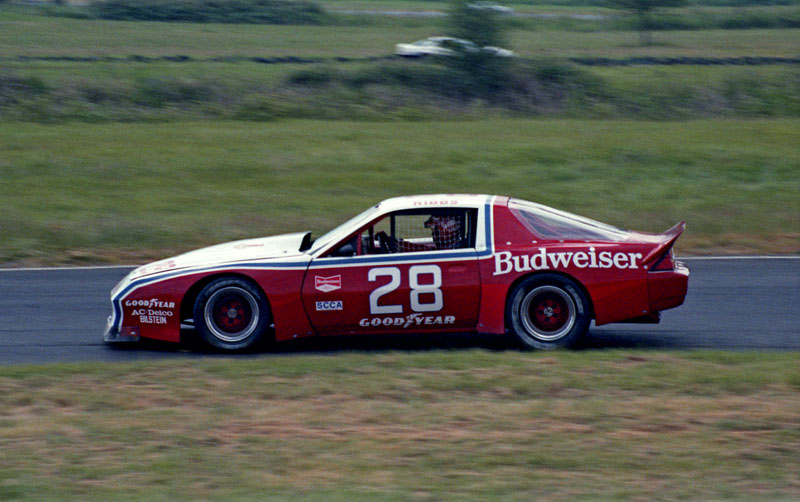
Willy T. Ribbs in a DeAtley Motorsports Camaro in 1983.

In 1983 Neil DeAtley assembled a two-car team of Camaros for the Trans-Am Series. DeAtley's major sponsor was Budweiser; noteworthy for the attraction of a truly major sponsor to the series. David Hobbs and Willy T. Ribbs dominated the 1983 season, with Ribbs winning five races and Hobbs winning four. Hobbs took the Championship with his more consistent finishes, while Ribbs was named Trans-Am Series Rookie of the Year.

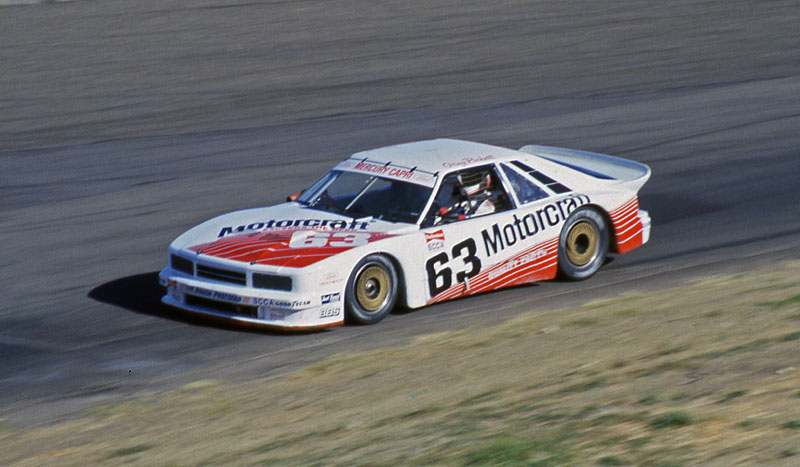
Greg Pickett in a Roush Protofab Mercury Capri in 1984.

For the 1984 season, Mercury took the Manufacturers' title with Ribbs as the lead driver for Roush Racing. For the next six years, Roush entries would dominate the series, winning 46 of the 83 races. Back with Roush again for the 1985 season, Ribbs scored seven victories and became the leading money winner in Trans-Am Series history, yet finished second in points, as teammate Wally Dallenbach Jr. used his consistently higher finishes (including 5 wins) to take the Championship, and become the youngest Trans-Am Champion in history.

In 1984, a Porsche Turbo Carrera became the first turbocharged car to win a Trans-Am race, but it wouldn't be the last. 1986 was wildly competitive as the turbocharged, small displacement engine cars would become more powerful and go from field fillers to race winners. The Roush Racing Mercury Capri V8s, and Merkur XR4Ti turbo 4s went head-to-head against the Camaro V8s, and the turbocharged Buick Somerset. Actor/race driver Paul Newman took round 8 in his Nissan 300ZX Turbo. Dallenbach would again take the Championship, this time in a 'Protofab Racing' Camaro.

The Roush Merkurs of Scott Pruett and Pete Halsmer dominated the 13 race 1987 season, winning all but one race, with Elliott Forbes-Robinson taking that win in his Porsche 944 Turbo. Pruett would win his first Drivers' Championship; the only one ever won in an XR4Ti.

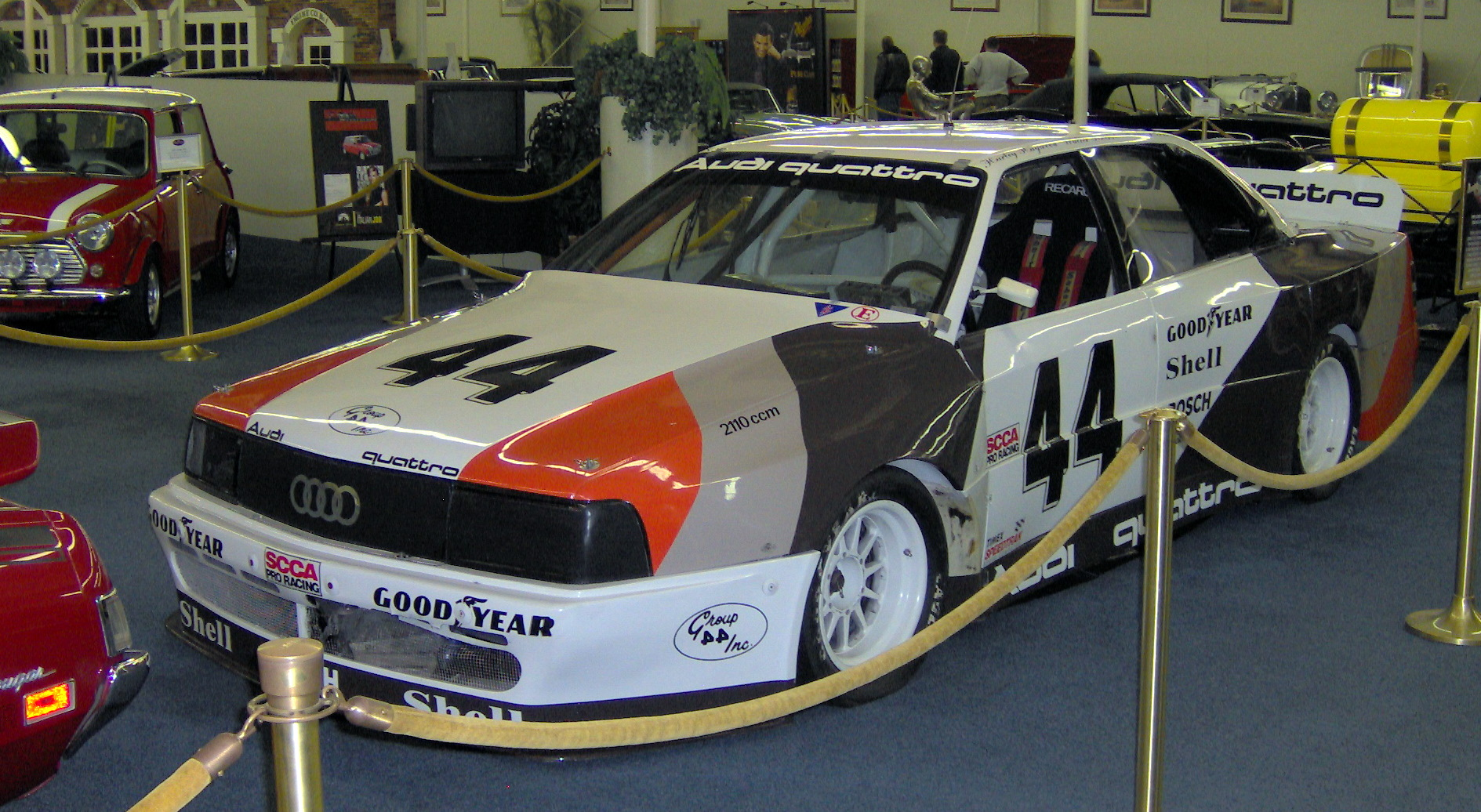
1989 Audi 200 Quattro Trans-Am racecar with 4 wheel drive

In 1988, after years of rallying, Audi would enter the series with the 200 turbo quattro via the services of Bob Tullius's Group 44 Racing. With the Quattro's all-wheel-drive system, the cars piloted by Hurley Haywood, and with both Walter Röhrl and Hans-Joachim Stuck sharing duties, steamrolled the opposition, taking eight out of thirteen wins, and giving Audi its one and only Manufacturers' Championship. The Audi 200 Turbo Quattro is the only all-wheel-drive car ever to win a Trans Am Championship for its manufacturer. The SCCA would subsequently change the rules to two wheel drive only, and ban cars with non-American engines from taking part, but Audi had already planned to defect to IMSA after the 1988 season anyway.

=== Modern era: More evolution (1989–2005) ===
1989 marked a major change in the Trans-Am Series, as throughout much of the nineties Trans-Am would evolve into an American-manufacturer-based series, with aftermarket V8s stuffed into any American branded car. This would last until the rise of Jaguar at the turn of the millennium.

Chevrolet was prominent in this time period, with six Manufacturers' Championships and six Drivers' Championships among five different drivers. Only Scott Sharp would win two Manufacturers' Championships for Chevrolet in the 1990s.

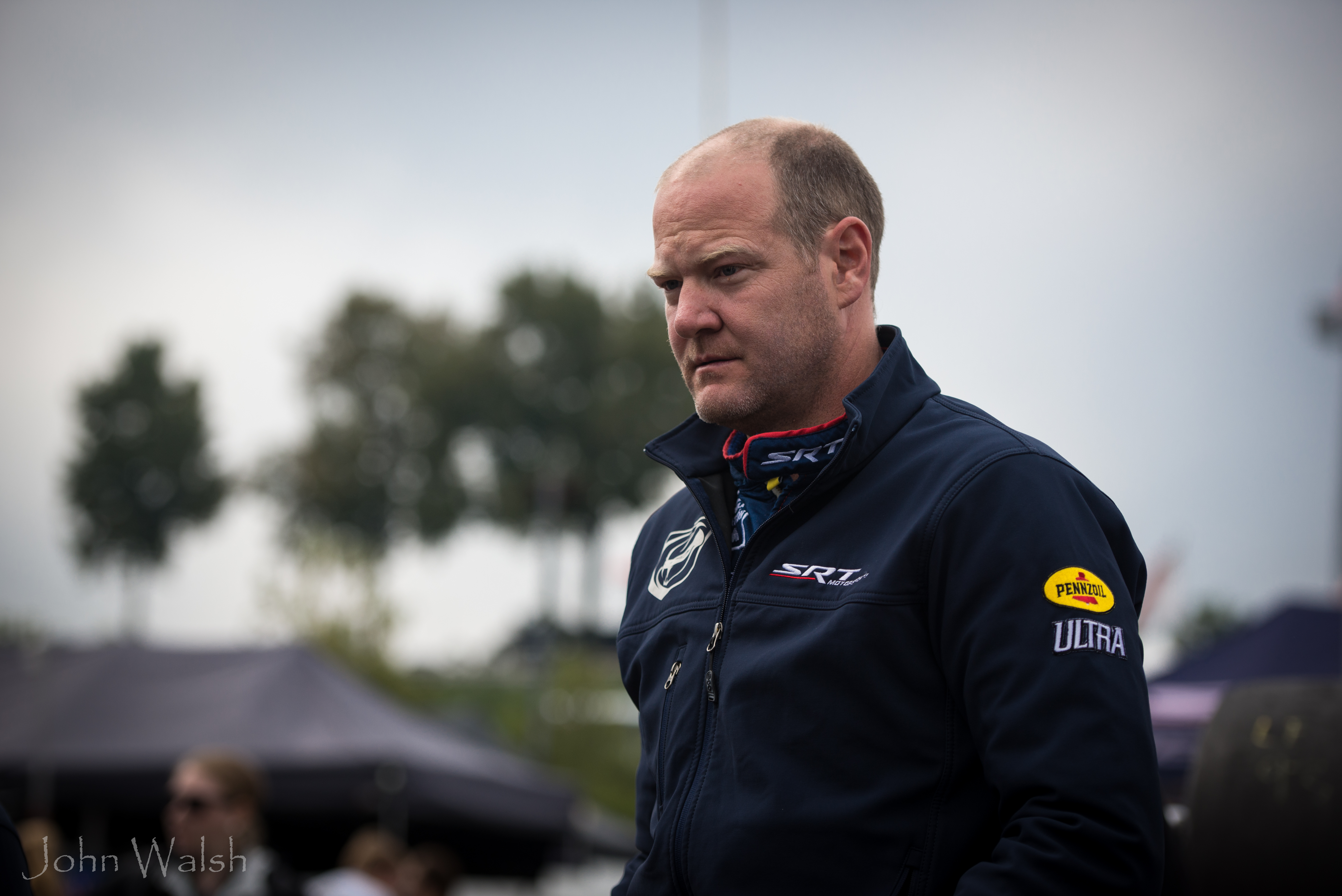
Tommy Kendall owns Trans-Am's win streak, and consecutive Class Championships records

In the mid-1990s, Tommy Kendall, in a Chevrolet and then a Ford, was the driver to beat—he would take four Drivers' Championships in this decade (three of them in a row, driving a Mustang). In 1997, he won a record 11 races in a row, guaranteeing his third consecutive Championship, which is itself a record for the 'single class of competition' era. His 28 wins and four Championships are second only to Mark Donohue's 29 wins*, and Paul Gentilozzi's 31 wins and five Championships. (* 27 of Mark Donohue's wins were achieved without a co-driver, and all 28 of Tommy Kendall's wins were solo efforts.) Paul Gentilozzi rose to the fore beginning in 1998 with his first Trans-Am Series Championship. He would win 4 more Championships, driving a Chevrolet, a Ford, and a Jaguar. His 31 wins and five Championships are the most in the history of the series.

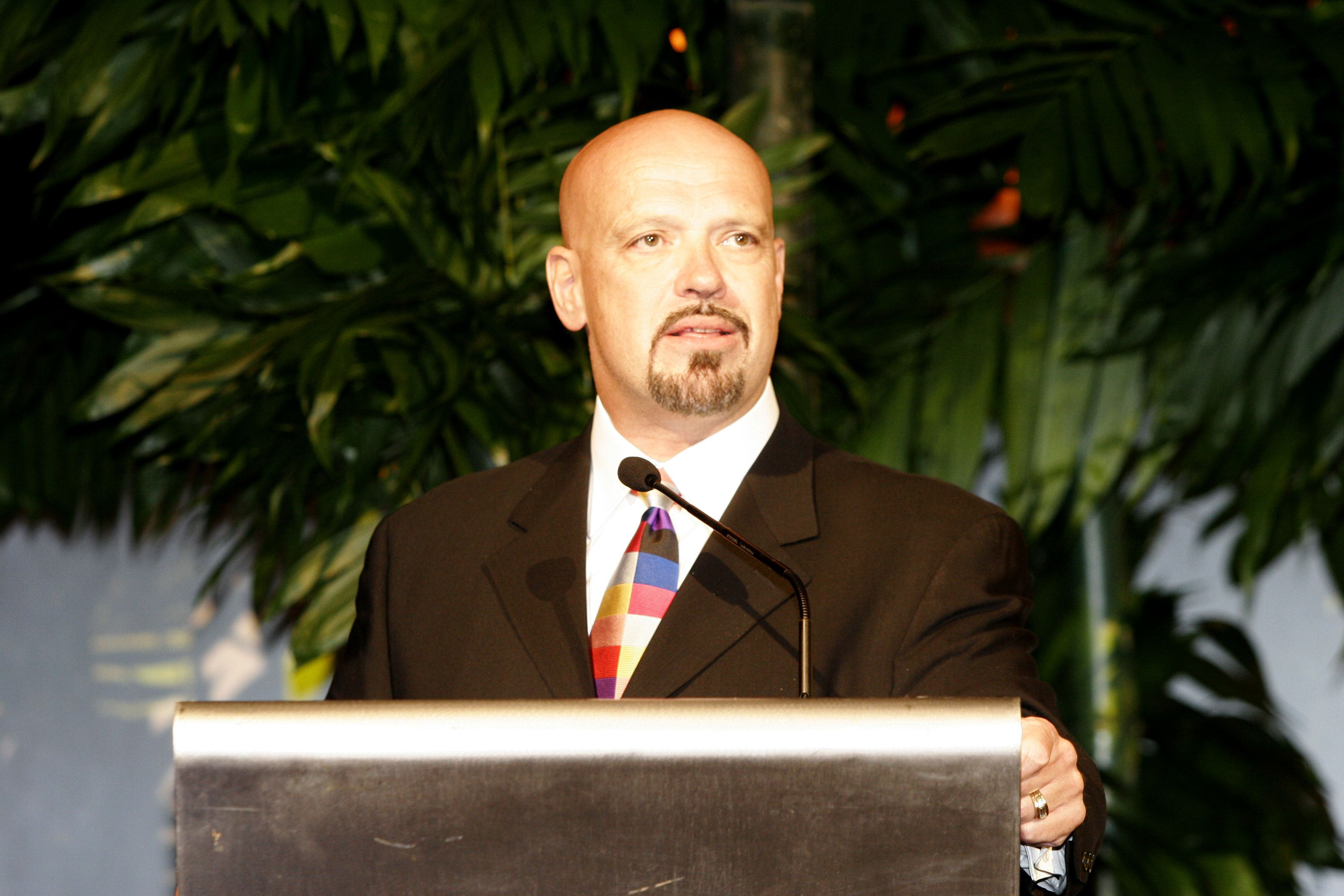
Paul Gentilozzi's 31 wins put him at the top of the charts

The late 1990s would see the rise of Rocketsports Racing's dominance using Corvettes ('98), Mustangs ('99), and finally Jaguar XKRs, which would continue until (the series dissolved in) 2006 and also 2009, after which team owner Paul Gentilozzi would switch to the American Le Mans Series. In an 11-year span, Rocketsports Racing would garner a total of eight Championships among four different drivers.

It was, however, the end of the "American muscle revival" era that had begun in 1989, with Italian manufacturer Qvale winning the championship in 2000.

The rules package changed again in 2000, with "Spec" (design specifications) rear wings being made legal for the first time, and new manufacturers being added to the eligibility list (exotics such as the Panoz Esperante, Qvale Mangusta and Jaguar XKR), along with their fuel injected / multi-valve engines.

For the last race of the 2003 season, the series went to Puerto Rico for the first time in history, with hometown hero Wally Castro finishing first. It was also the first time since 1991 that the series raced outside of Continental North America.

In 2003 and 2004, it was the Jaguar XKR's turn to win all but one race (10/11, 8/9), powered by its Double Overhead Camshaft, Jaguar AJ-V8 engine, again courtesy of Paul Gentilozzi and Rocketsports Racing.

With his win in Edmonton, Alberta (Canada) in 2005, Greg Pickett became the only Trans Am Series driver in its 39-year history to win at least one race in four different decades.

=== New ownership and cancellations (2006–2008) ===
Open Wheel Racing Series, co-owned by Gentilozzi, Gerald Forsythe and Kevin Kalkhoven, became the new owners of Trans-Am in late 2003. However, the series ceased operations after the 2005 season due to a lack of participants and interest. The SCCA continued to own the series' name. In 2006, SCCA Pro Racing took over ownership and management of the series. A mere two races were run at Heartland Park Topeka in September and October 2006, using Trans-Am Series rules and the Trans-Am name. Fields were shored up by a makeshift assortment of SCCA GT-1 class amateur racers in town for the National Championship Runoffs later that week. Paul Gentilozzi won both of the races, and was awarded the 2006 Trans-Am Series Drivers' Championship. No Manufacturers' Championship was awarded.

In 2007 and 2008, there were no Trans-Am Series races of any kind, and for a while, it seemed like it was the end of the Trans-Am Series, but that would soon change.

=== Trans-Am's homegrown return (2009–2011) ===
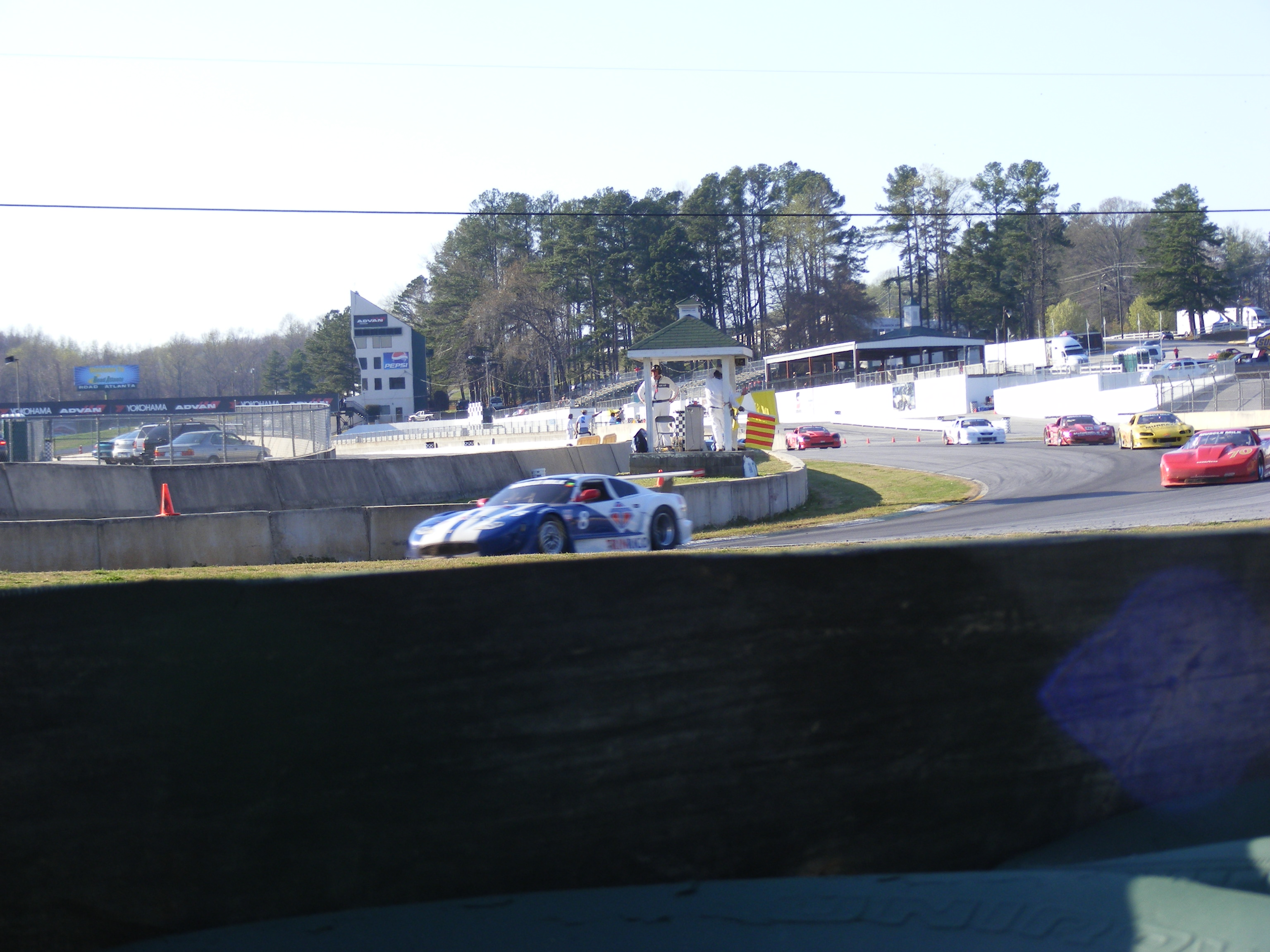
Tomy Drissi's Jaguar XKR leads the field at the first race of the revived Trans-Am Series at Road Atlanta

It was announced on December 11, 2008, that the Trans-Am Series would be returning in 2009 with a planned eight race schedule, and Muscle Milk (founded by 1978 Category 2 Champion Greg Pickett and his son Mike) as its title sponsor. The official name will be the "Muscle Milk SCCA Trans-Am Series". The revived series will use the SCCA's GT-1 class rules. A dedicated group of Trans-Am Series loyalists worked tirelessly to make the rebirth of the Trans-Am Series a reality, and it was to be a grass-roots based series with the potential to grow into a fully professional series. With the same vehicle rules as SCCA's amateur GT-1 class, top GT-1 class competitors would now have a new national racing series to help them progress to professional level racing. The first race was held March 22, 2009, at Road Atlanta with Greg Pickett taking the win. Driving a Jaguar, Tomy Drissi was the first Champion upon the series' return. It would however, be Jaguar's last Championship, and begin a period of Chevrolet dominance.

In 2011, in an effort to increase grid sizes which typically numbered in the single digits in 2010, the Trans-Am Series introduced two additional classes of competition in addition to the 2010 spec which raced as "TA1". The new "TA2" class consisted of SCCA GT-2 and GTA class cars, while the new "TA3" class consisted of SCCA GT-3 class cars; mainly smaller and lower-powered sports cars than TA1. However, there were no TA3 entries in 2011. For the final race of the 2011 season, a new class, "Global GT" (GGT) was introduced for production-based sports cars, such as the Ferrari F430 Challenge, and the Porsche GT3 Cup cars.

=== New era: Partnership agreements and more changes (2012–2016) ===
On September 29, 2011, the SCCA announced that the Trans Am Race Company, LLC will assume management of the Trans-Am Series from SCCA Pro Racing Ltd., the wholly owned subsidiary of Sports Car Club of America, beginning with the 2012 season. Through a 5-year agreement, the Trans Am Race Company (TARC) will assume full marketing rights to the series and will be responsible for Trans Am Series public relations and promotions. SCCA Pro Racing will continue to sanction Trans Am Series events and provide contracted event operations services to the series. SCCA Pro Racing President Tom Campbell, cites not having the resources to support growing the series as one of the reason for the transition. The Trans Am Race Company (TARC) is now owned by a group of Trans Am Series team owners and competitors. The current President of the Trans Am Race Company is John Clagett. Clagett had a 22-year affiliation with SCCA Pro Racing, and the Trans-Am Series, most recently as executive director of the Trans-Am Series in 2005, when Champ Car operated and sanctioned the series.

Trans Am partnered with GoRacingTV.com to provide a new form of video coverage for the 2012 season. The partnership provided global coverage of the series. Trans Am Series coverage was also provided by MavTV. The Trans Am Series has experienced record growth over the past two seasons and finds record numbers of entries at every race in 2015. In concert with the series' success, the television package has expanded to a total of 10 races (seven of the 12 events, three with coverage of two races, broken out as TA/TA3 and TA2) carried on the CBS Sports Network. In March 2017, it was announced that the television package had expanded again to 12 broadcasts (6 races, all with coverage of both the TA/TA3/TA4 and TA2 races), including the inaugural Indianapolis Motor Speedway race as well as the Circuit of the Americas race, that will feature both the Trans Am Championship Series and the Trans Am West Coast Championship Series racing simultaneously, yet competing separately. (See "Schedules" section)

In late 2012, the Sportscar Vintage Racing Association (SVRA) partnered with the Trans Am Race Company, LLC (TARC) to present Trans Am races at four of its 2013 events. “Our partnership with SVRA gives the Trans Am Series the opportunity to showcase historic Trans Am racing with the new generation of Trans Am cars at legendary race tracks, in event filled weekends,” said John Clagett, president of the Trans-Am Race Company. “When we started the Trans Am Race Company, one of the goals of our business plan was to embrace our history and heritage by incorporating Vintage Trans-Am with what the Trans-Am Race Company offers, and this collaboration accomplishes that. There's so much history associated with Trans-Am and so much momentum going forward that it's going to be great to combine the two for an unparalleled experience in 2013.” In 2016, Tony Parella, chief executive officer (CEO) of both SVRA and Parella Motorsports Holdings became a member of the TARC ownership group, with a significant ownership stake. In 2017, he acquired (via Parella Motorsports Holdings) a controlling interest in the TARC ownership group by purchasing the ownership share of the departing Mike Miller. John Clagett, David Jans, and Simon Gregg are the minority shareholders.

The series at this time was divided into three classes (TA, TA2, and GGT). For 2013, the recently introduced GGT class was replaced by the TA3 class, which was later broken into two subgroups: TA3-American Muscle, for current generation "pony cars" based on NASA American Iron Racing class rules, with year and model restrictions; and TA3-International, for select cars based on SCCA GT-2 rules. Both subgroups were discontinued after the 2015 season. For 2016, TA3-I was renamed TA3, TA3-A was renamed "TA4", and "TA5" was introduced for cars such as the Ferrari F430 Challenge, and select Porsche models (just like the old GGT class). TA5 was discontinued after the fourth race of 2016. TA5 class cars now race in TA3. The rules package from the 2016 season (featuring four classes; TA, TA2, TA3, and TA4) was retained for 2017, with (among other things) changes being made to allow specified foreign makes and models to race in the TA4 class. (*The official Trans Am Series rule book is periodically updated, and changes are made to it when it becomes necessary or desirable to do so.)

In 2016, Ernie Francis Jr. won his third consecutive Trans Am Series Drivers' Championship. Two of the championships were in the TA3-American Muscle class, and the other in TA4, which are production-based classes rather than a tube-frame / silhouette body class, as in the case of Tommy Kendall's three consecutive championships that were won when there was one class of competition, as opposed to four in 2015 and five in 2016.

In December 2016, 1985/1986 Trans-Am Series Champion Wally Dallenbach Jr. was named Chief Steward ("...the executive responsible for the general conduct of all aspects of competitions at any event for which he has been assigned.") of the Trans Am Series. Wally Dallenbach Sr. was Chief Steward of CART (now Champ Car) from 1981 to 2004. In January 2018, 1989 Trans Am Series Champion Dorsey Schroeder was appointed Chief Steward after Dallenbach Jr. left the Trans Am Series due to time conflicts.

=== Continued expansion (2017–present) ===
In late 2016, the Trans Am Race Company (TARC) announced that after a long absence, the Trans Am Series would return to the West Coast with the 2017 Trans Am West Coast Championship, partnering with the Sportscar Vintage Racing Association (SVRA). The West Coast Championship consists of a separate three race competition, plus one round that is shared with the Trans Am Championship at Circuit of the Americas.

In January 2017, SCCA Pro Racing and the Trans Am Race Company, LLC (TARC) signed an unprecedented 25-year agreement, renewing their earlier partnership, and ensuring that Trans Am Series racing will continue through the 2041 season.

For the first time in its 50+ year history, the Trans Am Series raced (on the Grand Prix road course) at the iconic Indianapolis Motor Speedway in 2017, partnering with the Sportscar Vintage Racing Association (SVRA). Additionally, the twin "Motor City 100" races (for TA and TA2 classes only) on Detroit's Belle Isle street circuit were made points eligible, non-exhibition races.

For 2018, the primary series' schedule was reduced from 13 to 11 events, dropping Brainerd, Minnesota, and New Jersey Motorsports Park. The Belle Isle race in Detroit became a TA2 class only event, and a little later in the season, the TA, TA3, and TA4 classes raced at the Pittsburgh International Race Complex for the first time ever. The West Coast Series left Willow Springs, California, but added Sonoma, California, and also raced at Indianapolis with the primary series in a shared event. 2018 also saw the addition of Northern and Southern regional championships, which are open to partial season participants only. All primary championship series events are also in one or the other of these regional championship series, with the exception of Circuit of the Americas (COTA).

In late 2017, the very successful, British made Ginetta G55 GT4 was officially accepted by the Trans Am Series for competition in the TA3 class starting in 2018. The marque was raced in an exhibition capacity and evaluated at the race at COTA, and joined Aston Martin as the only other British made entry in TA3.

For 2019, the TA3 and TA4 production-based classes were renamed SGT (SuperGT) and GT, respectively. According to Trans Am Race Company President John Clagett, the new names were intended to align the classes with naming conventions used in other GT racing series in North America. The GT and SGT classes include performance coupes, performance sedans, and touring cars with a range of engine and drivetrain configurations.

For 2020, the season finale at Daytona International Speedway was dropped due to unresolvable scheduling conflicts, and after a two-year absence, the race at Brainerd, Minnesota, was reinstated to honor the late Jed Copham, the track's co-owner and part-time Trans-Am Series driver. Purse bonuses and participation incentive bonuses totaling $35,000 were available to drivers competing during the "Jed Copham Memorial Weekend". The season's grand finale in both series would now be the combined event at Circuit Of The Americas (COTA), with that race being moved from October to November because of the extremely hot, record breaking weather in 2019. In the West Coast Championship series, the season started one month earlier (mid-March) at Sonoma Raceway, which will for the first time ever also hold a second race in late August to make up for the Auto Club Speedway race being dropped. Other than this and minor reordering, the schedule remains at six races, with Laguna Seca as the other combined event where both series will be racing together.

The Trans Am Series also decided to add a new production-based class for 2020, which will be positioned in-between TA2 and SGT. The new Xtreme GT (XGT) class features 2016 and earlier FIA Group GT3 cars that are ineligible to compete in any other racing series. A wide variety of high-performance domestic and international makes and models will now be able to race in the Trans Am Series.

In early January 2020, the Trans Am Race Company (TARC) announced that it was expanding into Australia and New Zealand through the year 2026, signing a multi-year licensing agreement with the Australian Racing Group Pty Ltd. (ARG) that will allow for six TA2 Class races to be run in 'the land down-under'. The new collaboration will be the first full-season international expansion ever in the series' 54-year history. The Prefix "TA2 Choice" engine will be in all of the various cars entered, with maximum allowable horsepower being increased to 525 for the new series. Five Star Race Car Bodies will supply all of the bodies, and USA based TA2 chassis builders will supply all of the chassis. Pre-raced cars and chassis will be allowed as well. (TARC-approved chassis builders or their appointed dealers within the territory will also be allowed to supply chassis.)

== Notable drivers ==
Many accomplished drivers with well known names have competed in the series since its inception, such as Jochen Rindt, Richard Petty, David Pearson, A. J. Foyt, Mark Donohue, Parnelli Jones, Dan Gurney, and even well known Hollywood actor and four-time SCCA Champion Paul Newman, who won the 1982 race at Minnesota's Brainerd International Raceway, and the 1986 race at Connecticut's Lime Rock Park, as well as multiple Championship winners such as Peter Gregg, George Follmer, Bob Tullius, Paul Gentilozzi, Wally Dallenbach Jr., Scott Sharp, Tommy Kendall, Scott Pruett, Scott Lagasse Jr., Tony Ave, Amy Ruman, and Ernie Francis Jr.. A complete listing of Trans-Am Series winners by class (Current and Historic) can be found at https://gotransam.com/about/Trans-Am-Series-Records/59449.

Although she was not the first woman to compete in the Trans-Am Series (Janet Guthrie, 1973, 1978), in 2011, Amy Ruman became the first one in the series' 45-year history to win a race, accomplishing the historic feat in the season finale at Road Atlanta. In 2015, she would become the first woman to win a Trans Am Series Championship, and in 2016, the first one to win two Series Championships, even winning them consecutively.

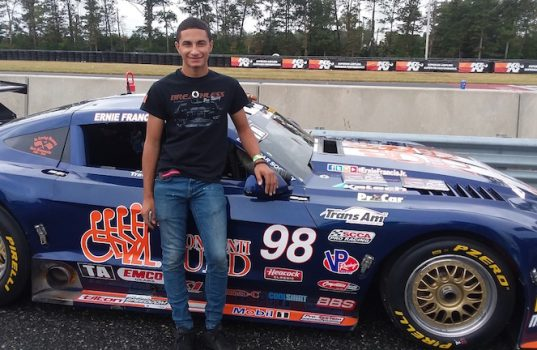
2017/8/9 TA Class Champion Ernie Francis Jr. and his Ford Mustang (Photo courtesy of https://speed51.com/trans-am-champ-taking-on-new-challenge-as-d4d-finalist/)

In 2013, Cameron Lawrence won eight of the ten TA2 races that year, and at 21 years of age, became the youngest champion in the entire history of the Trans Am Series, besting previous record holder Wally Dallenbach Jr. by one year. Currently, his 20 TA2 class wins make him the winningest TA2 driver in the history of the series. If that wasn't enough, in 2014, at just 16 years of age, Ernie Francis Jr. became the youngest series champion ever, winning the title in the TA3–A class. He backed it up with a second TA3–A championship in 2015, and a third championship in 2016, this time in the (formerly named TA3–A) TA4 class, making him the youngest series champion ever to win three of them in a row. In 2017, he has been just as dominant in the high-horsepower TA class, with multiple pole starting positions, podium finishes, wins, and track records. With his win at New Jersey Motorsports Park, he secured his first TA class championship at just 19 years of age, taking the record away from Wally Dallenbach Jr., who won his first TA championship at age 22. He is now the youngest Series Champion ever to win three consecutive TA Class championships. (*From 1995 to 1997, Tommy Kendall won three championships in a row when there was a single class of competition) Overall, he has also won six championships in a row when the TA3-A and TA4 classes are included. He now has a chart-topping 33 combined wins across all classes. Paul Gentilozzi is the Series' all-time winningest driver in a single class of competition with 31 wins, followed closely by Mark Donohue (29), and Tom Kendall (28).

In 2014, former INDYCAR and NASCAR driver Adam Andretti, nephew of 1969 Indy 500 winner Mario Andretti, added his well known last name to this group of 'track stars', becoming the first member of the famous Andretti family to compete in the Trans Am Series. Andretti has raced a Camaro, a Mustang, and a Challenger in the TA2 class regularly, picking up 6 wins and finishing second in points twice. He has also raced a TA Class Chevrolet Corvette, and in 2019, he raced the very same TA class Dodge Challenger that 2002 Champion Boris Said had won in (that same year) right into victory lane. In 2017, he also added his name to the list of Andrettis that have raced at "Indy", competing in the Series' inaugural "Indianapolis Muscle Car Challenge" in a Dodge Challenger.

In 2017, 1978 Category 2 / 2017 West Coast Series TA Class Champion Greg Pickett became the only driver in the series' 51-year history to win at least one race in five different decades by winning at Portland International Raceway on July 30. He won his very first race 39 years before that, on May 21, 1978.

== Retrospective Drivers Champions ==
Race historians have rated the overall finishers in the early Trans-Am Series years by the driver points scheme in place from 1972 until 1989 to crown unofficial overall Drivers Champions for 1966–1971. This listing first appeared in Albert R. Bochroch's 1986 book Trans-Am Racing 1966–1985.

Year	Champion Driver	Car	Team
1966	(United States) A.J. Foyt	Ford Mustang	Shelby American
1967	(United States) Jerry Titus	Ford Mustang	Shelby American
1968	(United States) Mark Donohue	Chevrolet Camaro	Penske Racing
1969	(United States) Mark Donohue	Chevrolet Camaro	Penske Racing
1970	(United States) Parnelli Jones	Ford Mustang	Bud Moore Engineering
1971	(United States) Mark Donohue	AMC Javelin	Penske Racing

== See also ==
- History of the Trans Am Series 1966-1995 DVD
