= 1967 Trans-American Championship =

1967 Trans-Am Series

Seasons
- ← 1966 1968 →

The 1967 Trans-American Championship was the second running of the Sports Car Club of America's Trans-Am Series. After the dominance of Alfa Romeo in the under 2000cc class in 1966, Porsche would rise to prominence, starting a dynasty that would last for several years. 1967 would also mark the debut of Mercury, with Dan Gurney winning at Green Valley for the company in its new Cougar. David Pearson would also win in a Cougar at Riverside later that year. Ford and Mercury would both end the year strongly, with four wins apiece. Mark Donohue would provide the first win in the series for Chevrolet at Marlboro Speedway. He would go on to win at Stardust and Pacific Raceways, igniting the Ford vs Chevy rivalry that made the series legendary.

Ford won the Over 2 Liter class and Porsche the Under 2 Liter class.

== Schedule ==
Overall winner in bold.

Rnd	Date	Circuit	Distance	Over 2.0 Winning Car	Under 2.0 Winning Car
Rnd	Date	Circuit	Distance	Over 2.0 Winning Driver(s)	Under 2.0 Winning Driver(s)
1	February 3	Daytona International Speedway, Daytona Beach, Florida	300.99 mi (484.40 km)	**Dodge Dart**	Porsche 911
1	February 3	Daytona International Speedway, Daytona Beach, Florida	300.99 mi (484.40 km)	**(United States) Bob Tullius**	(United States) Peter Gregg
2	March 31	Sebring International Raceway, Sebring, Florida	4 Hours; 379.6 mi (610.9 km)	**Ford Mustang**	Porsche 911
2	March 31	Sebring International Raceway, Sebring, Florida	4 Hours; 379.6 mi (610.9 km)	**(United States) Jerry Titus**	(United States) Peter Gregg (United States) Sam Posey
3	April 16	Green Valley Raceway, Smithfield, Texas	300.8 mi (484.1 km)	**Mercury Cougar**	Porsche 911
3	April 16	Green Valley Raceway, Smithfield, Texas	300.8 mi (484.1 km)	**(United States) Dan Gurney**	(United States) John Pauly (United States) Bill Bowman
4	May 30	Lime Rock Park, Lakeville, Connecticut	4 Hours; 328.5 mi (528.7 km)	**Mercury Cougar**	Alfa Romeo GTA
4	May 30	Lime Rock Park, Lakeville, Connecticut	4 Hours; 328.5 mi (528.7 km)	**(United States) Peter Revson**	(Australia) Horst Kwech
5	June 11	Mid-Ohio Sports Car Course, Lexington, Ohio	300 mi (480 km)	**Ford Mustang**	Alfa Romeo GTA
5	June 11	Mid-Ohio Sports Car Course, Lexington, Ohio	300 mi (480 km)	**(United States) Jerry Titus**	(Australia) Horst Kwech
6	August 6	Bryar Motorsports Park, Loudon, New Hampshire	249.6 mi (401.7 km)	**Mercury Cougar**	Porsche 911
6	August 6	Bryar Motorsports Park, Loudon, New Hampshire	249.6 mi (401.7 km)	**(United States) Peter Revson**	(United States) Bert Everett
7	August 12; August 13^{A}	Marlboro Speedway, Upper Marlboro, Maryland	301 mi (484 km); 301 mi (484 km)	Chevrolet Camaro	Porsche 911
7	August 12; August 13^{A}	Marlboro Speedway, Upper Marlboro, Maryland	301 mi (484 km); 301 mi (484 km)	(United States) Mark Donohue (United States) Craig Fisher	(United States) Bert Everett (United States) Jerry Titus
8	August 27	Continental Divide Raceway, Castle Rock, Colorado	250.04 mi (402.40 km)	**Ford Mustang**	Alfa Romeo GTA
8	August 27	Continental Divide Raceway, Castle Rock, Colorado	250.04 mi (402.40 km)	**(United States) Jerry Titus**	(Australia) Horst Kwech
9	September 10	Crows Landing Naval Auxiliary Air Station, Crows Landing, California	258 mi (415 km)	**Ford Mustang**	Alfa Romeo GTA
9	September 10	Crows Landing Naval Auxiliary Air Station, Crows Landing, California	258 mi (415 km)	**(United States) Jerry Titus**	(United States) Monty Winkler
10	September 17	Riverside International Raceway, Riverside, California	249.6 mi (401.7 km)	**Mercury Cougar**	Porsche 911
10	September 17	Riverside International Raceway, Riverside, California	249.6 mi (401.7 km)	**(United States) David Pearson**	(United States) Bert Everett
11	October 1	Stardust International Raceway, Las Vegas, Nevada	351 mi (565 km)	**Chevrolet Camaro**	Alfa Romeo GTA
11	October 1	Stardust International Raceway, Las Vegas, Nevada	351 mi (565 km)	**(United States) Mark Donohue**	(Australia) Horst Kwech
12	October 8	Pacific Raceways, Kent, Washington	303.75 mi (488.84 km)	**Chevrolet Camaro**	Porsche 911
12	October 8	Pacific Raceways, Kent, Washington	303.75 mi (488.84 km)	**(United States) Mark Donohue**	(United States) Gary Wright (United States) Mike Eyerly

^A Classes ran separate races at Marlboro.

== Championships ==
Points were awarded according to finishing position. Only the highest-placed car scored points for the manufacturer. Only the best 9 finishes counted towards the championship. Drivers' championships were not awarded in Trans-Am until 1972.

1st	2nd	3rd	4th	5th	6th
9	6	4	3	2	1

=== Over 2.0L manufacturers ===
Pos	Manufacturer	DAY	SEB	GRV	LRP	MOH	BRY	MAR	CDV	CLD	RIV	SDT	PAC	Pts
1	Ford	4	1	3	3	1	2	2	1	1	4	2	2	64 (74)
2	Mercury	3	5	1	1	2	1	9	2	2	1	4	3	62 (67)
3	Chevrolet	2	2	4	2	3	5	1	5	3	3	1	1	57 (64)
4	Dodge	1	8	13	14	16		5	10			14		11

=== Under 2.0L manufacturers ===
Pos	Manufacturer	DAY	SEB	GRV	LRP	MOH	BRY	MAR	CDV	CLD	RIV	SDT	PAC	Pts
1	Porsche	1	1	1	2	3	1	1	3	2	1	2	1	75 (89)
2	Alfa Romeo	3	4	3	1	1	4	15	1	1	6	1	4	59 (63)
3	Ford of Britain	11	20	7	9	6	8	13	8	8	10	5	5	5
4=	BMC	9	6	6			13	11	7					2
4=	BMW		23			10		24			5	9	9	2
6	Volvo	19					6	9	11					1

== See also ==
- 1967 Can-Am season
- 1967 United States Road Racing Championship season
