= 1968 Trans-American Championship =

1968 Trans-Am Series

Seasons
- ← 1967 1969 →

The 1968 Trans-American Championship was the third running of the Sports Car Club of America's Trans-Am Series. 1968 marked the addition of the 12 Hours of Sebring and the 24 Hours of Daytona, the only year that the Trans-Am Series featured those races. The season also marked the first time that an event was held outside of the United States, when a race at Mont-Tremblant brought Trans-Am into Quebec, Canada.

The championship was open to SCCA Sedans, which were required to conform with FIA Group 1 Series Production Touring Car or Group 2 Touring Car regulations. A Manufacturers Champion was determined in both Over 2-liter and Under 2-liter classes. The titles were awarded to Chevrolet (thanks to Mark Donohue's unprecedented 8 race winning streak, and Chevrolet winning 10 out of 13 races) and Porsche (thanks to Tony Adamowicz' 5 race class winning streak and Porsche's eight class wins in a row) respectively.

== Schedule ==
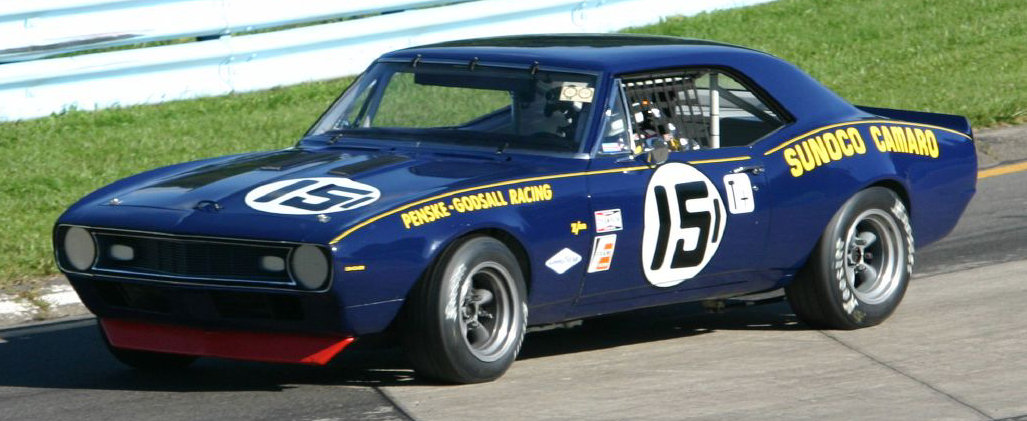
Chevrolet won the Over 2.0 Liter title with its Camaros. Car is often shown in historic events, as seen in 2004.

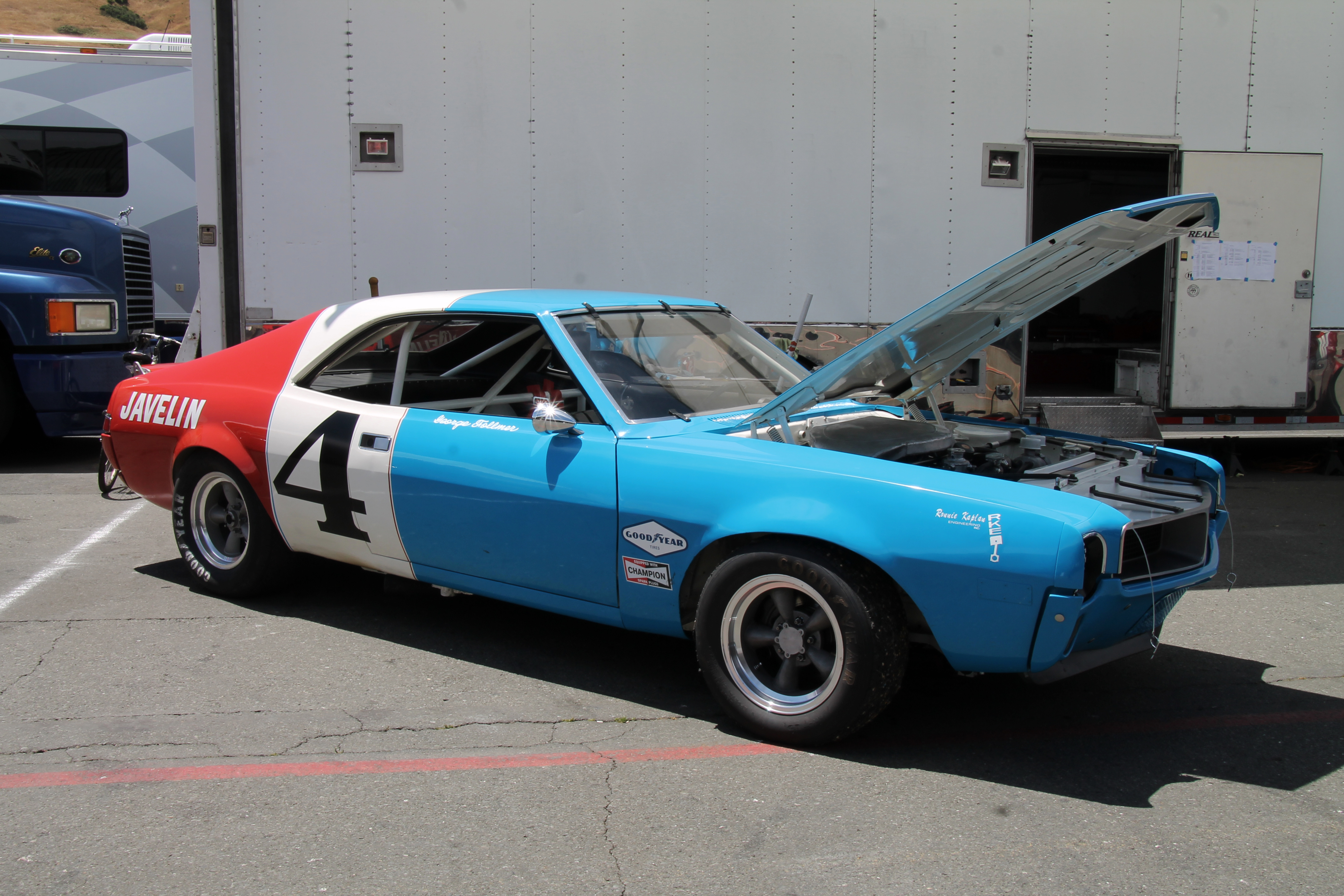
American Motors placed third in the Over 2.0 Liter class with its Javelins. This from a 2015 vintage meeting.

Rnd	Date	Circuit	Distance	Over 2.0 Winning Car	Under 2.0 Winning Car
Rnd	Date	Circuit	Distance	Over 2.0 Winning Driver(s)	Under 2.0 Winning Driver(s)
1	February 3–4	Daytona International Speedway, Daytona Beach, Florida	24 Hours; 2,369.49 mi (3,813.32 km)	Ford Mustang	Porsche 911
1	February 3–4	Daytona International Speedway, Daytona Beach, Florida	24 Hours; 2,369.49 mi (3,813.32 km)	(United States) Jerry Titus (United States) Ronnie Bucknum	(United States) Peter Gregg (United States) Stan Axelsson
2	March 22	Sebring International Raceway, Sebring, Florida	3 Hours; 275.6 mi (443.5 km)		Porsche 911
2	March 22	Sebring International Raceway, Sebring, Florida	3 Hours; 275.6 mi (443.5 km)		(United States) Bert Everett
2	March 23	Sebring International Raceway, Sebring, Florida	12 Hours; 1,149.2 mi (1,849.5 km)	Chevrolet Camaro	
2	March 23	Sebring International Raceway, Sebring, Florida	12 Hours; 1,149.2 mi (1,849.5 km)	(United States) Mark Donohue (United States) Craig Fisher	
3	May 12	War Bonnet Raceway Park, Mannford, Oklahoma	253 mi (407 km)	Chevrolet Camaro	Alfa Romeo GTA
3	May 12	War Bonnet Raceway Park, Mannford, Oklahoma	253 mi (407 km)	(United States) Mark Donohue	(Australia) Horst Kwech
4	May 30	Lime Rock Park, Lakeville, Connecticut	3 Hours; 261.63 mi (421.05 km)	Chevrolet Camaro	Porsche 911
4	May 30	Lime Rock Park, Lakeville, Connecticut	3 Hours; 261.63 mi (421.05 km)	(United States) Mark Donohue	(United States) Tony Adamowicz
5	June 16	Mid-Ohio Sports Car Course, Lexington, Ohio	244.8 mi (394.0 km)	Chevrolet Camaro	Porsche 911
5	June 16	Mid-Ohio Sports Car Course, Lexington, Ohio	244.8 mi (394.0 km)	(United States) Mark Donohue	(United States) Bert Everett
6	June 23	Bridgehampton Race Circuit, Sag Harbor, New York	3 Hours; 282.15 mi (454.08 km)	Chevrolet Camaro	Porsche 911
6	June 23	Bridgehampton Race Circuit, Sag Harbor, New York	3 Hours; 282.15 mi (454.08 km)	(United States) Mark Donohue	(United States) Tony Adamowicz
7	July 7	Meadowdale International Raceway, Carpentersville, Illinois	240 mi (390 km)	Chevrolet Camaro	Porsche 911
7	July 7	Meadowdale International Raceway, Carpentersville, Illinois	240 mi (390 km)	(United States) Mark Donohue	(United States) Tony Adamowicz
8	July 21	Circuit Mont-Tremblant, Saint-Jovite, Quebec	3 Hours; 254.4 mi (409.4 km)	Chevrolet Camaro	Porsche 911
8	July 21	Circuit Mont-Tremblant, Saint-Jovite, Quebec	3 Hours; 254.4 mi (409.4 km)	(United States) Mark Donohue	(United States) Tony Adamowicz
9	August 4	Bryar Motorsports Park, Loudon, New Hampshire	200 mi (320 km)	Chevrolet Camaro	Porsche 911
9	August 4	Bryar Motorsports Park, Loudon, New Hampshire	200 mi (320 km)	(United States) Mark Donohue	(United States) Tony Adamowicz
10	August 11	Watkins Glen International, Watkins Glen, New York	2 Hours, 30 Minutes; 262.2 mi (422.0 km)	Ford Mustang	Porsche 911
10	August 11	Watkins Glen International, Watkins Glen, New York	2 Hours, 30 Minutes; 262.2 mi (422.0 km)	(United States) Jerry Titus	(United States) Tony Adamowicz
11	August 25	Continental Divide Raceway, Castle Rock, Colorado	250 mi (400 km)	Chevrolet Camaro	Porsche 911
11	August 25	Continental Divide Raceway, Castle Rock, Colorado	250 mi (400 km)	(United States) Mark Donohue	(United States) Fred Baker
12	September 8	Riverside International Raceway, Riverside, California	249.6 mi (401.7 km)	Ford Mustang	Alfa Romeo GTA
12	September 8	Riverside International Raceway, Riverside, California	249.6 mi (401.7 km)	(Australia) Horst Kwech	(United States) Vic Provenzano
13	October 6	Pacific Raceways, Kent, Washington	303.75 mi (488.84 km)	Chevrolet Camaro	Alfa Romeo GTA
13	October 6	Pacific Raceways, Kent, Washington	303.75 mi (488.84 km)	(United States) Mark Donohue	(United States) Ed Wachs

== Championships ==
=== Points system ===
Points were awarded to manufacturers according to the finishing positions in each race.

1st	2nd	3rd	4th	5th	6th
9	6	4	3	2	1

Only the highest-placed car scored points for the manufacturer and only the best 10 finishes counted towards the championship.

Drivers' championships were not awarded in Trans-Am until 1972.

=== Over 2.0 Liter Manufacturers Championship standings ===
Pos	Manufacturer	DAY	SEB	WBN	LRP	MOH	BRI	MEA	MTB	BRY	WGL	CDV	RIV	PAC	Pts
1	Chevrolet	2	1	1	1	1	1	1	1	1	2	1	4	1	90 (105)
2	Ford	1	3	3	2	2	5	5	7	3	1	3	1	3	59 (63)
3	American Motors		5	2	3	3	2	2	2	2	4	5	2	5	51 (53)
4	Pontiac							4	4	7	12	2	3	2	22

=== Under 2.0 Liter Manufacturers Championship standings ===
Pos	Manufacturer	DAY	SEB	WBN	LRP	MOH	BRI	MEA	MTB	BRY	WGL	CDV	RIV	PAC	Pts
1	Porsche	1	1	2	1	1	1	1	1	1	1	1	2	3DNF	90 (102)
2	Alfa Romeo	5	3	1	7	4		4				3	1	1	43
3	BMW					6DNF		7			4		13	2	9
4	Volvo				6		5		7	8	6				4
5=	BMC		14	6			9	10	5	9	10				3
5=	Lancia		9									5	6		3

== See also ==
- 1968 Can-Am season
- 1968 United States Road Racing Championship season
