= 1971 Trans-American Sedan Championship =

1971 Trans-Am Series

Seasons
- ← 1970 1972 →

The 1971 Trans-American Championship was the sixth running of the Sports Car Club of America's Trans-Am Series. The format was altered to an over 2500cc class and an under 2500cc class, up 500cc from past years. All races used split classes except where noted. The year marked the rise of Datsun as a competitive brand, with the Japanese company winning several races throughout the season. American Motors, led by Mark Donohue's 7 wins, and Datsun, led by John Morton's 6 wins, won the manufacturers' championships.

== Schedule ==
Rnd	Date	Circuit	Distance	Over 2.5 Winning Car	Under 2.5 Winning Car
Rnd	Date	Circuit	Distance	Over 2.5 Winning Driver	Under 2.5 Winning Driver
1	May 8	Lime Rock Park, Lakeville, Connecticut	130 mi (210 km) (U2L); 200.43 mi (322.56 km) (O2L)	AMC Javelin	Alfa Romeo GTV
1	May 8	Lime Rock Park, Lakeville, Connecticut	130 mi (210 km) (U2L); 200.43 mi (322.56 km) (O2L)	(United States) Mark Donohue	(Australia) Horst Kwech
2	May 31	Bryar Motorsports Park, Loudon, New Hampshire	112 mi (180 km) (U2L); 152 mi (245 km) (O2L)	Ford Mustang	Alfa Romeo
2	May 31	Bryar Motorsports Park, Loudon, New Hampshire	112 mi (180 km) (U2L); 152 mi (245 km) (O2L)	(United States) George Follmer	(Switzerland) Gaston Andrey
3	June 6	Mid-Ohio Sports Car Course, Lexington, Ohio	106 mi (171 km) (U2L); 180 mi (290 km) (O2L)	Ford Mustang	Datsun 510
3	June 6	Mid-Ohio Sports Car Course, Lexington, Ohio	106 mi (171 km) (U2L); 180 mi (290 km) (O2L)	(United States) George Follmer	(United States) John Morton
4	June 20	Edmonton International Speedway, Edmonton, Alberta	106 mi (171 km) (U2L); 180 mi (290 km) (O2L)	AMC Javelin	Datsun 510
4	June 20	Edmonton International Speedway, Edmonton, Alberta	106 mi (171 km) (U2L); 180 mi (290 km) (O2L)	(United States) Mark Donohue	(United States) John Morton
5	July 4	Donnybrooke International Speedway, Brainerd, Minnesota	150 mi (240 km) (U2L); 210 mi (340 km) (O2L)	AMC Javelin	Alfa Romeo GTA
5	July 4	Donnybrooke International Speedway, Brainerd, Minnesota	150 mi (240 km) (U2L); 210 mi (340 km) (O2L)	(United States) Mark Donohue	(United States) Bert Everett
6	July 17	Road America, Elkhart Lake, Wisconsin	108 mi (174 km) (U2L); 200 mi (320 km) (O2L)	AMC Javelin	Datsun 510
6	July 17	Road America, Elkhart Lake, Wisconsin	108 mi (174 km) (U2L); 200 mi (320 km) (O2L)	(United States) Mark Donohue	(United States) John Morton
7	July 25	Naval Air Station Olathe, Olathe, Kansas	120 mi (190 km)	not contested	Datsun 510
7	July 25	Naval Air Station Olathe, Olathe, Kansas	120 mi (190 km)	not contested	(United States) John Morton
8	August 1	Circuit Mont-Tremblant, Saint-Jovite, Quebec	185.5 mi (298.5 km)	AMC Javelin	not contested
8	August 1	Circuit Mont-Tremblant, Saint-Jovite, Quebec	185.5 mi (298.5 km)	(United States) Mark Donohue	not contested
9	August 15	Watkins Glen International, Watkins Glen, New York	123.828 mi (199.282 km) (U2L); 218.24 mi (351.22 km) (O2L)	AMC Javelin	Alfa Romeo GTV
9	August 15	Watkins Glen International, Watkins Glen, New York	123.828 mi (199.282 km) (U2L); 218.24 mi (351.22 km) (O2L)	(United States) Mark Donohue	(Australia) Horst Kwech
10	September 6	Michigan International Speedway, Brooklyn, Michigan	209.79 mi (337.62 km)	AMC Javelin	not contested
10	September 6	Michigan International Speedway, Brooklyn, Michigan	209.79 mi (337.62 km)	(United States) Mark Donohue	not contested
11	October 3 October 4	Riverside International Raceway, Riverside, California	114.75 mi (184.67 km) (U2L); 201.4 mi (324.1 km) (O2L)	AMC Javelin	Datsun 510
11	October 3 October 4	Riverside International Raceway, Riverside, California	114.75 mi (184.67 km) (U2L); 201.4 mi (324.1 km) (O2L)	(United States) George Follmer	(United States) John Morton
12	October 16	Laguna Seca Raceway, Monterey, California	110.2 mi (177.3 km)	not contested	Datsun 510
12	October 16	Laguna Seca Raceway, Monterey, California	110.2 mi (177.3 km)	not contested	(United States) John Morton^{A}

^A Horst Kwech won the race on track, but was disqualified for an oversize fuel tank.

== Championships ==
Points were awarded according to finishing position. Only the highest-placed car scored points for the manufacturer. Only the best 8 finishes counted toward the championship. Drivers' championships were not awarded in Trans-Am until 1972.

1st	2nd	3rd	4th	5th	6th
9	6	4	3	2	1

=== Over 2.5L manufacturers ===
Pos	Manufacturer	LRP	BRY	MOH	EDM	DON	ELK	MTB	WGL	MIC	RIV	Pts
1	American Motors	1	3	2	1	1	1	1	1	1	1	82
2	Ford	2	1	1	2	3	2	2	2	2	4	61
3	Chevrolet	3	5	7	3	5	7	7	5	6	5	17
4	Pontiac	19	4	5		28		25	15	5		7

=== Under 2.5L manufacturers ===
Pos	Manufacturer	LRP	BRY	MOH	EDM	DON	ELK	OLA	WGL	RIV	LAG	Pts
1	Datsun	7	6	1	1	5	1	1	3	1	1	60 (62)^{B}
2	Alfa Romeo	1	1	2	2	1	2	2	1	2	2	60 (72)
3	BMW	2	2	5	10	7	5	6	4	6	3	25
4	Ford of Britain	13	20		7	4	12	13	7			3
5	British Leyland	21	12	10	6	6	11	14	23	23	17	2

^B Tie broken based on Datsun's higher number of wins.

== See also ==
- 1971 Can-Am season
