= 1970 Trans-American Sedan Championship =

1970 Trans-Am Series

Seasons
- ← 1969 1971 →

The 1970 Trans-American Championship was a motor racing series organised by the Sports Car Club of America for SCCA Sedans. It was the fifth Trans-Am Championship. Ford won the Over 2 Liter title and Alfa Romeo were victorious in the Under 2 Liter class.

With Porsche's 911 moving to a 2.2L engine, the year marked the resurgence of Alfa Romeo as dominant in the Under 2 Liter class. The year also marked the first race win for American Motors, with Mark Donohue driving a Penske Racing-prepared AMC Javelin, winning three races. Also winning for the first time was BMW, in the Under 2 Liter races at Bryar and Bridgehampton.

== Schedule ==
The championship was contested over eleven rounds with separate races at each round for Under 2 Liter and Over 2 Liter cars.

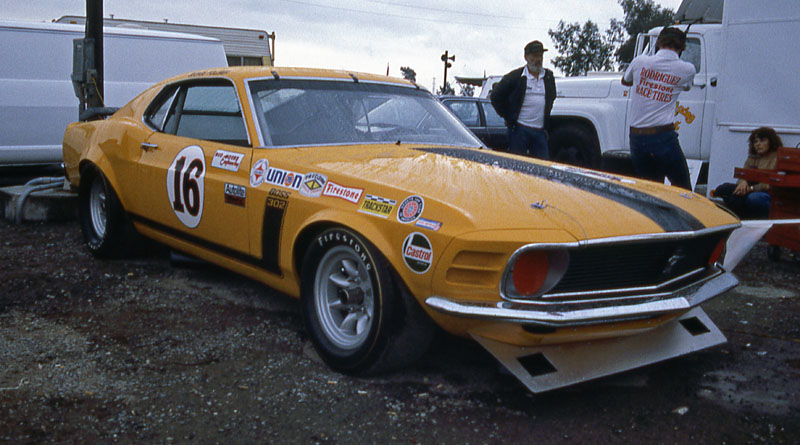
Ford won the 1970 Trans-American Championship Over 2 Liter division with the Mustang

Rnd	Date	Circuit	Distance	Over 2.0 Winning Car	Under 2.0 Winning Car
Rnd	Date	Circuit	Distance	Over 2.0 Winning Driver(s)	Under 2.0 Winning Driver(s)
1	April 18; April 19	Laguna Seca Raceway, Monterey, California	85.5 mi (137.6 km) (U2L); 171 mi (275 km) (O2L)	Ford Mustang	Alfa Romeo GTA
1	April 18; April 19	Laguna Seca Raceway, Monterey, California	85.5 mi (137.6 km) (U2L); 171 mi (275 km) (O2L)	(United States) Parnelli Jones	(United States) Lee Midgley
2	May 9	Lime Rock Park, Lakeville, Connecticut	1 Hour / 84.15 mi (135.43 km) (U2L); 2 Hours, 30 Minutes / 223.38 mi (359.50 km) (O2L)	Ford Mustang	Alfa Romeo GTA
2	May 9	Lime Rock Park, Lakeville, Connecticut	1 Hour / 84.15 mi (135.43 km) (U2L); 2 Hours, 30 Minutes / 223.38 mi (359.50 km) (O2L)	(United States) Parnelli Jones	(Switzerland) Gaston Andrey
3	May 31	Bryar Motorsports Park, Loudon, New Hampshire	1 Hour / 72 mi (116 km) (U2L); 2 Hours, 30 Minutes / 223.38 mi (359.50 km) (O2L)	Ford Mustang	BMW 2002
3	May 31	Bryar Motorsports Park, Loudon, New Hampshire	1 Hour / 72 mi (116 km) (U2L); 2 Hours, 30 Minutes / 223.38 mi (359.50 km) (O2L)	(United States) George Follmer	(United States) Peter Schuster
4	June 7	Mid-Ohio Sports Car Course, Lexington, Ohio	72 mi (116 km) (U2L); 180 mi (290 km) (O2L)	Ford Mustang	Alfa Romeo GTA
4	June 7	Mid-Ohio Sports Car Course, Lexington, Ohio	72 mi (116 km) (U2L); 180 mi (290 km) (O2L)	(United States) Parnelli Jones	(United States) Bert Everett
5	June 20; June 21	Bridgehampton Race Circuit, Sag Harbor, New York	99.25 mi (159.73 km) (U2L); 199.5 mi (321.1 km) (O2L)	AMC Javelin	BMW 2002
5	June 20; June 21	Bridgehampton Race Circuit, Sag Harbor, New York	99.25 mi (159.73 km) (U2L); 199.5 mi (321.1 km) (O2L)	(United States) Mark Donohue	(United States) Hans Ziereis
6	July 5	Donnybrooke International Speedway, Brainerd, Minnesota	99 mi (159 km) (U2L); 210 mi (340 km) (O2L)	Chevrolet Camaro	Alfa Romeo GTA
6	July 5	Donnybrooke International Speedway, Brainerd, Minnesota	99 mi (159 km) (U2L); 210 mi (340 km) (O2L)	(United States) Milt Minter	(Australia) Horst Kwech
7	July 19	Road America, Elkhart Lake, Wisconsin	100 mi (160 km) (U2L); 200 mi (320 km) (O2L)	AMC Javelin	Alfa Romeo GTA
7	July 19	Road America, Elkhart Lake, Wisconsin	100 mi (160 km) (U2L); 200 mi (320 km) (O2L)	(United States) Mark Donohue	(Australia) Horst Kwech
8	August 2	Circuit Mont-Tremblant, Saint-Jovite, Quebec	79.5 mi (127.9 km) (U2L); 185.5 mi (298.5 km) (O2L)	AMC Javelin	Alfa Romeo GTA
8	August 2	Circuit Mont-Tremblant, Saint-Jovite, Quebec	79.5 mi (127.9 km) (U2L); 185.5 mi (298.5 km) (O2L)	(United States) Mark Donohue	(United States) Lee Midgley
9	August 16	Watkins Glen International, Watkins Glen, New York	96.6 mi (155.5 km) (U2L); 209.3 mi (336.8 km) (O2L)	Chevrolet Camaro	Alfa Romeo GTA
9	August 16	Watkins Glen International, Watkins Glen, New York	96.6 mi (155.5 km) (U2L); 209.3 mi (336.8 km) (O2L)	(United Kingdom) Vic Elford	(Australia) Horst Kwech
10	September 20	Seattle International Raceway, Kent, Washington	90 mi (140 km) (U2L); 202.5 mi (325.9 km) (O2L)	Ford Mustang	Alfa Romeo GTA
10	September 20	Seattle International Raceway, Kent, Washington	90 mi (140 km) (U2L); 202.5 mi (325.9 km) (O2L)	(United States) Parnelli Jones	(United States) Bert Everett
11	October 4	Riverside International Raceway, Riverside, California	89.25 mi (143.63 km) (U2L); 201.45 mi (324.20 km) (O2L)	Ford Mustang	Alfa Romeo GTA
11	October 4	Riverside International Raceway, Riverside, California	89.25 mi (143.63 km) (U2L); 201.45 mi (324.20 km) (O2L)	(United States) Parnelli Jones	(United States) Bert Everett

== Championships ==
Points were awarded according to finishing position. Only the highest-placed car scored points for the manufacturer. Only the best 9 finishes counted towards the championship. Drivers' championships were not awarded in Trans-Am until 1972.

1st	2nd	3rd	4th	5th	6th
9	6	4	3	2	1

=== Over 2.0L manufacturers ===
Pos	Manufacturer	LAG	LRP	BRY	MOH	BRI	DON	ELK	MTB	WGL	SEA	RIV	Pts
1	Ford	1	1	1	1	2	2	(5)	2	(3)	1	1	72 (78)
2	American Motors	2	13	2	3	1	19	1	1	2	2	3	59
3	Chevrolet	5	2	4	4	4	1	4	(6)	1	5	(6)	40 (42)
4	Dodge	6	3	23	5	20	20	3	4	29	3	24	18
5	Plymouth	4	10	14	21	21	5	2	28	6	18	4	15

Note: Brackets around race placings indicate that points for that placing were not counted towards the overall points total.

=== Under 2.0L manufacturers ===
Pos	Manufacturer	LAG	LRP	BRY	MOH	BRI	DON	ELK	MTB	WGL	SEA	RIV	Pts
1	Alfa Romeo	1	1	(2)	1	(2)	1	1	1	1	1	1	81 (93)
2	BMW	2	3	1	(6)	1	3	2	(4)	3	2	3	52 (56)
3=	Fiat Abarth		6	8	5	14							3
3=	British Motor Corp.	5	8	9			6	7	9	14		11	3

Note: Brackets around race placings indicate that points for that placing were not counted towards the overall points total.
