= War Bonnet Raceway Park =

Former race track

- Location: Mannford, Oklahoma, USA
- Coordinates: 36.153885°N 96.363171°W
- Broke ground: 1966
- Opened: 1967
- Closed: 1970
- Major events: Trans-Am Series (1968); F5000 (1967-1968); SCCA (1967-1970)
- Surface: Asphalt
- Length: 3.7 km (2.3 mi)
- Turns: 11
- Race lap record: 1:30.000 ( (United States) Lou Sell, Eagle Mk.5, 1968, F5000)

War Bonnet Raceway Park was a purpose-built 2.3-mile road course located in Mannford, Oklahoma, which played host to a single Trans-Am Series event in 1968, two open-wheel SCCA F5000 event in 1967 and 1968, as well as various sports car races organized by the SCCA between 1967 and 1970.

== Lap Records ==
The fastest official race lap records at War Bonnet Raceway Park are listed as:

Category	Time	Driver	Vehicle	Date
Road Course: 3.700 km (1967–1970)
F5000	1:30.000	Lou Sell	Eagle Mk.5	1968 Grand Prix of Oklahoma
Trans-Am	1:35.400	Parnelli Jones	Ford Mustang	1968 War Bonnet Trans-Am round
