= 1969 Trans-American Sedan Championship =

1969 Trans-Am Series

Seasons
- ← 1968 1970 →

The 1969 Trans-American Championship was the fourth running of the Sports Car Club of America's Trans-Am Series. The championship was open to SCCA Sedan category cars competing in Over 2 liter and Under 2 liter classes. 1969 marked the end of the use of co-drivers in the Trans-Am Championship, as most of the races were between 2.5 and 3 hours. The Over 2 liter and Under 2 liter Manufacturers' titles were won by Chevrolet (Due in large part to Mark Donohue's 6 wins, and a major crash at the St. Jovite, Canada race that nearly destroyed all the Ford and Shelby team cars. Not including the controversial illegal underweight Camaro used by Donohue, wins were to be stripped from Chevrolet given to Ford. But GM threatened to take their money and leave the series.) and Porsche (Due in large part to Peter Gregg's 7 wins) respectively.

== Schedule ==
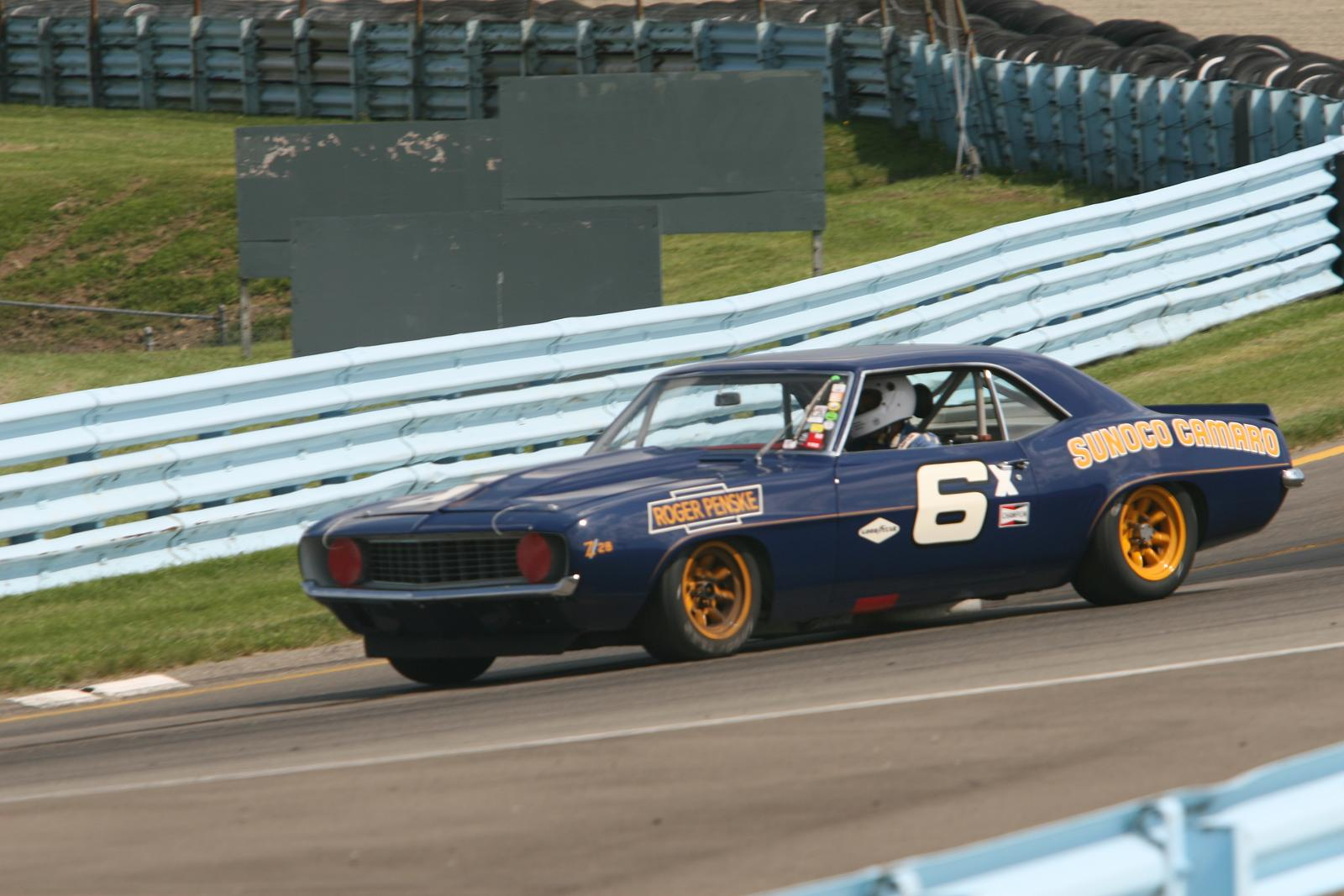
Chevrolet won the Over 2 liter class championship. Mark Donohue's 1969 Chevrolet Camaro from the series is shown at the U. S. Vintage Grand Prix at Watkins Glen International, a vintage car show where historic race cars are driven.

The championship was contested over twelve races.

Race	Date	Circuit	Distance	Over 2 liter winning car	Under 2 liter winning car
Race	Date	Circuit	Distance	Over 2 liter winning car	Under 2 liter winning car
1	May 11	Michigan International Speedway, Brooklyn, Michigan	344.24 mi (554.00 km)	Ford Mustang	Porsche 911
1	May 11	Michigan International Speedway, Brooklyn, Michigan	344.24 mi (554.00 km)	(United States) Parnelli Jones	(United States) Gary Wright
2	May 30	Lime Rock Park, Lakeville, Connecticut	2 h 30 min 218.79 mi (352.11 km)	Ford Mustang	Porsche 911
2	May 30	Lime Rock Park, Lakeville, Connecticut	2 h 30 min 218.79 mi (352.11 km)	(United States) Sam Posey	(United States) Tony Adamowicz
3	June 8	Mid-Ohio Sports Car Course, Lexington, Ohio	240 mi (390 km)	Chevrolet Camaro	Porsche 911
3	June 8	Mid-Ohio Sports Car Course, Lexington, Ohio	240 mi (390 km)	(United States) Ronnie Bucknum	(United States) Peter Gregg
4	June 22	Bridgehampton Race Circuit, Sag Harbor, New York	250.8 mi (403.6 km)	Ford Mustang	Porsche 911
4	June 22	Bridgehampton Race Circuit, Sag Harbor, New York	250.8 mi (403.6 km)	(United States) George Follmer	(United States) Peter Gregg
5	July 6	Donnybrooke International Speedway, Brainerd, Minnesota	252 mi (406 km)	Ford Mustang	Porsche 911
5	July 6	Donnybrooke International Speedway, Brainerd, Minnesota	252 mi (406 km)	(United States) Parnelli Jones	(United States) Peter Gregg
6	July 20	Bryar Motorsports Park, Loudon, New Hampshire	200 mi (320 km)	Chevrolet Camaro	Alfa Romeo GTA
6	July 20	Bryar Motorsports Park, Loudon, New Hampshire	200 mi (320 km)	(United States) Mark Donohue	(Switzerland) Gaston Andrey
7	August 3	Circuit Mont-Tremblant, Saint-Jovite, Quebec	3 h 257 mi (414 km)	Chevrolet Camaro	Porsche 911
7	August 3	Circuit Mont-Tremblant, Saint-Jovite, Quebec	3 h 257 mi (414 km)	(United States) Mark Donohue	(United States) Peter Gregg
8	August 10	Watkins Glen International, Watkins Glen, New York	2 h 30 min 269.1 mi (433.1 km)	Chevrolet Camaro	Porsche 911
8	August 10	Watkins Glen International, Watkins Glen, New York	2 h 30 min 269.1 mi (433.1 km)	(United States) Mark Donohue	(United States) Peter Gregg
9	August 24	Laguna Seca Raceway, Monterey, California	226.1 mi (363.9 km)	Chevrolet Camaro	Porsche 911
9	August 24	Laguna Seca Raceway, Monterey, California	226.1 mi (363.9 km)	(United States) Mark Donohue	(United States) Peter Gregg
10	September 7	Seattle International Raceway, Kent, Washington	303.75 mi (488.84 km)	Chevrolet Camaro	Porsche 911
10	September 7	Seattle International Raceway, Kent, Washington	303.75 mi (488.84 km)	(United States) Ronnie Bucknum	(United States) Peter Gregg
11	September 21	Sears Point Raceway, Sonoma, California	201.84 mi (324.83 km)	Chevrolet Camaro	Porsche 911
11	September 21	Sears Point Raceway, Sonoma, California	201.84 mi (324.83 km)	(United States) Mark Donohue	(United States) Don Pike
12	October 5	Riverside International Raceway, Riverside, California	201.84 mi (324.83 km)	Chevrolet Camaro	Porsche 911
12	October 5	Riverside International Raceway, Riverside, California	201.84 mi (324.83 km)	(United States) Mark Donohue	(United States) Alan Johnson

== Championships ==
Points were awarded for finishing positions in each class at each race on the following basis:

1st	2nd	3rd	4th	5th	6th
9	6	4	3	2	1

Only the highest-placed car of each make could earn points for its manufacturer and only the best nine results for each manufacturer counted towards the championship totals.

No Drivers titles were awarded in 1969 or in any other Trans-American Championship prior to 1972.

=== Over 2 liter Manufacturers Championship ===
Pos	Manufacturer	MIC	LRP	MOH	BRI	DON	BRY	MTB	WGL	LAG	PAC	SPT	RIV	Points
1	Chevrolet	2	3	1	2	2	1	1	1	1	1	1	1	78 (94)
2	Ford	1	1	2	1	1	3	8	2	3	2	2	4	64 (71)
3	Pontiac	3	5	8	3	4	5	2	12	5	3	4	3	32 (34)
4	American Motors	4	7	5	6	5	8	4	5	7	12	8	6	14

=== Under 2 liter Manufacturers Championship ===
Pos	Manufacturer	MIC	LRP	MOH	BRI	DON	BRY	MTB	WGL	LAG	PAC	SPT	RIV	Points
1	Porsche	1	1	1	1	1	2	1	1	1	1	1	1	81 (106)
2	Alfa Romeo	3	2	8	3		1	12		7	4		5	28
3	BMW	9			9	3		14	8	6				5
4	British Leyland							3						4

== The cars ==
The following models contributed to the points totals of their respective manufacturers.

- Chevrolet Camaro
- Ford Mustang
- Pontiac Firebird
- AMC Javelin
- Porsche 911
- Alfa Romeo GTA
- BMW 2002Ti
- Mini Cooper S

== 1969 Pontiac Firebird Trans Am ==
1969 had marked the sales debut of the Pontiac Firebird Trans Am however the car's smallest engine was well over the 5000cc maximum set by the series at the time and it was not used in the 1969 championship. In using the name Trans Am, a registered trademark, General Motors agreed to pay $5 per car sold to the SCCA.
