= Jerry Titus =

American motorsports driver (1928–1970)

- Born: 24 October 1928 Johnson City, New York, US
- Died: Milwaukee, Wisconsin, US

Trans Am
- Teams: Terlingua Racing Team, T-G Racing
- Starts: 43
- Wins: 7
- Poles: 5

Previous series
- SCCA National Championship, Formula Junior, Can-Am

Championship titles
- 1967: Trans Am Driver's Championship

Awards
- 1969: Touring Class winner of The 24 Hours of Daytona

Jerry Titus (October 24, 1928 – August 5, 1970) was an American motorsports driver, mechanic, model, musician and journalist — widely known for his motorsport victories in the SCCA National Sports Car Championships and the SCCA Trans-Ams Series as well as his career in automotive journalism, the latter prominently as a technical editor and later editor-in-chief for Sports Car Graphic magazine.

In 2010, Titus was inducted into the Motorsports Hall of Fame of America.

== Background ==
Titus was born Gerald Arthur Titus Jr. on October 24, 1928 in Johnson City, New York, to Charlotte Kathryn (nee Burlew) and Gerald Arthur Titus—a year before the stock market crash of the great depression. His parents moved through many jobs, including running a dairy farm in Florida. The family eventually moved back to New York, his mother working with Grumman Aircraft and his father operating a Sinclair gas station and installing heating and cooling equipment.

Titus originally became a talented trumpet player, later studying at the Juilliard School of Music in New York City and performing in the band of jazz trombonist Jack Teagarden.

Titus eventually changed careers and became an auto mechanic, working at the performance auto shop of car customizer Bill Frick, discovering his talent for driving sports cars, testing vehicles and repairing customers' race cars. In 1946, he joined Cad Allard and Studilac Cars as a shop manager for Maserati. In the later 1950s, Titus became a racer in the amateur Formula Junior series.

Developing his interest in automotive journalism, Titus wrote his first article for Speed Age in 1954 and was later ghostwriting for Sports Car Illustrated. By 1958, he was editor for Foreign Cars Illustrated and Auto Sport, (FCI). In 1960, Titus became a member of the editorial staff of Sports Car Graphic (when FCI became Sports Car Graphic).

After reporting and reviewing sports cars, Titus became a racing program test driver, including for the Bill Thomas Cheetah, and Elva Porsche. In 1968, he left Sports Car Graphic and devoted himself full time to racing with the magazine sponsoring him in a factory racing Sunbeam Alpine in 1962 and 1963.

Titus was a resident of Tarzana, California, when he died in a single car 1970 race practice accident, leaving behind his second wife, Anna, and two sons from a previous marriage, Steven, age 17 (flown in from Vietnam to be at his father's bedside), and Rick age 20, who would later become an automotive journalist and race car driver.

== Racing career ==
Titus again captured the attention of Carroll Shelby, as he had once repaired his Maserati race car during a test drive of the 1965 Shelby GT350 for Sports Car Graphic. Shelby offered Titus a place on his SCCA National Championship team, and Titus won the 1965 Pacific Coast National Championship with a production GT350.

In 1966, Titus entered the newly created SCCA Trans-Am series for Shelby's Terlingua Racing Team and achieved victory at the last race of the season at Riverside International Raceway. Titus would become known as "Mr. Trans Am".

Titus left his position as editor-in-chef at Sports Car Graphic and became a full-time racing driver for Shelby's team. He went on to become the number one team driver and won both the 1967 Manufacturer's Championship for Ford and the 1967 Driver's Championship as well.

In the 1968 season, poor performance by the Terlingua team, which resulted in four DNFs out of 12 starts, had Titus preparing to leave the team to race a Pontiac Firebird. When Carroll Shelby learned of the impending change, he decided not to enter Titus in the last race of the season. Not to be deterred, with funding by Canadian businessman Terry Godsall, he purchased a used 1968 Camaro Z/28 Trans Am car and reskinned it as a Firebird, with plans to race it under T-G Racing banner for the 1969 series.

Titus entered the 1969 24 Hours of Daytona and raced to a class victory and an overall third place.

The 1969 season was plagued with engine configuration problems for the new car, resulting in 3 DNFs for the team. The highlight of the season was a second-place finish for Titus at Sainte Jovite, Quebec.

Titus completed only one race out of seven in the 1970 season, taking seventh place at Laguna Seca.

== Death ==
During a practice session on July 19, 1970 for the Trans Am race at the Road America course near Elkhart Lake, Wisconsin, Titus' Pontiac Firebird experienced a steering gear failure, causing his car to skid 250 feet into the concrete abutment of the Bill Mitchell Bridge outside of Turn 13. Titus's car erupted in flames, and he received a frontal skull fracture, internal injuries and a broken arm. He was taken to St. Joseph's Hospital in Milwaukee and was removed from the critical list a week later but succumbed after complications, thought to be a blood clot to the brain, on August 5, 1970. Titus had been quoted six weeks earlier in the Franklin, Pennsylvania News Herald, saying, "TransAm Racing is a deadly business."

The Billy Mitchell Bridge, which transporters and spectators used to access the circuit paddock, had become a source of concern for safety reasons. After Titus' death and Memo Gidley's serious crash at the 2001 CART race, as well as complaints by motorcycle racers and the use of larger transporters for professional teams that made the bridge impossible to be used, officials began formulating a plan to fix the problem. In the winter of 2006, the bridge was demolished, adding runoff at Turn 13 while adding a new tunnel and eliminating the point of impact where Titus was fatally injured.

Shortly after his death, the American Automotive Racing Writers and Broadcasters Association (AARWBA) named their annual "Driver of the Year" award the Jerry Titus Memorial Award and awarded it to the driver with the most votes among the winners in each category (stock car, open wheel, road racing, short track, touring, and at-large).

== Racing results ==
=== SCCA National Championship Runoffs ===
Year	Track	Car	Engine	Class	Finish	Start	Status
1964	Riverside	Webster Special	Climax	D Modified	1		Running
1965	Daytona	Ford Mustang GT350		B Production	1	5	Running
1966	Riverside	Porsche 911		D Production	1		Running
1966	Riverside	Elva Mk.7	Porsche	E Sports Racer			Retired
