= Bert Everett =

Australian rules footballer, born 1904

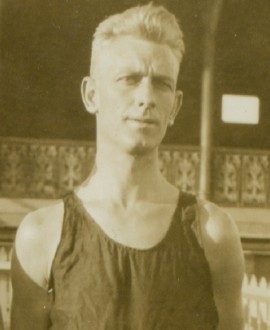
- Everett in 1930

Personal information
- Full name: Herbert Arthur Everett
- Born: 27 November 1904; Brunswick East, Victoria
- Died: 20 May 1958 (aged 53); Burnside, South Australia
- Original team: Brunswick (VFA)
- Height: 179 cm (5 ft 10 in)
- Weight: 74 kg (163 lb)

Playing career^{1}
Years	Club	Games (Goals)
1928–1929	Carlton	4 (0)
1930	Collingwood	4 (0)
Total		8 (0)
- ^{1} Playing statistics correct to the end of 1930.

Herbert Arthur Everett (27 November 1904 – 20 May 1958) was an Australian rules footballer who played for the Carlton Football Club and Collingwood Football Club in the Victorian Football League (VFL).
