= Horst Kwech =

Australian racing driver (1937–2019)

Horst Kwech (28 November 1937 – 28 December 2019) was an Australian race car driver, race car constructor, engineer and inventor known primarily for his several wins in the early Trans-Am Series races of the 1960s and the beginning of the 1970s.

Although born in Vienna, Austria, Kwech considered himself to be an Australian, proudly displaying the Aussie flag, the word "Australia" and other symbols such as a kangaroo on his race cars and drivers helmet throughout his career. Despite not having lived in Australia since his move to the United States in 1961, and being relatively unknown "Down Under", Kwech still travelled with an Australian passport, although more recently he became a US citizen following the Australian Government's decision to allow dual citizenship.

== Early life ==
Due to losing their house in a bombing raid early in World War II, Kwech's mother used her connections to emigrate with Horst and his older sister to Australia and the small New South Wales town of Cooma, just 115 km (71 mi) south of Australia's capital city, Canberra. There his mother and sister joined many other immigrants in working on the Snowy Mountains Scheme while Horst attended school, and later went on to work for a local car yard called Region Motors. Kwech, who got the racing bug when riding motorbikes with his mates on the dirt roads throughout the district, began sports car racing in Australia in the fifties with an Austin-Healey 100/4 for Leaton Motors. He showed his mechanical engineering talent early building a custom sports car, the RM Spyder, with a Straight 6 Holden Grey motor, which he later sold to finance his trip to the USA.

== Career in Racing ==
Following his move to America in 1961, Kwech joined Knauz Continental Motors of Lake Forest, Illinois in 1963 as a lead mechanic and later that year won the SCCA Central Division Championship in an AUSCA Mark II in what was his first year in US Racing. The AUSCA Mark II was an innovative tube frame sports car of Kwech’s design that competed with the Lotus 23. In 1965, Kwech won the SCCA Central Division Championship in an Alfa Romeo Giulia Ti Super.

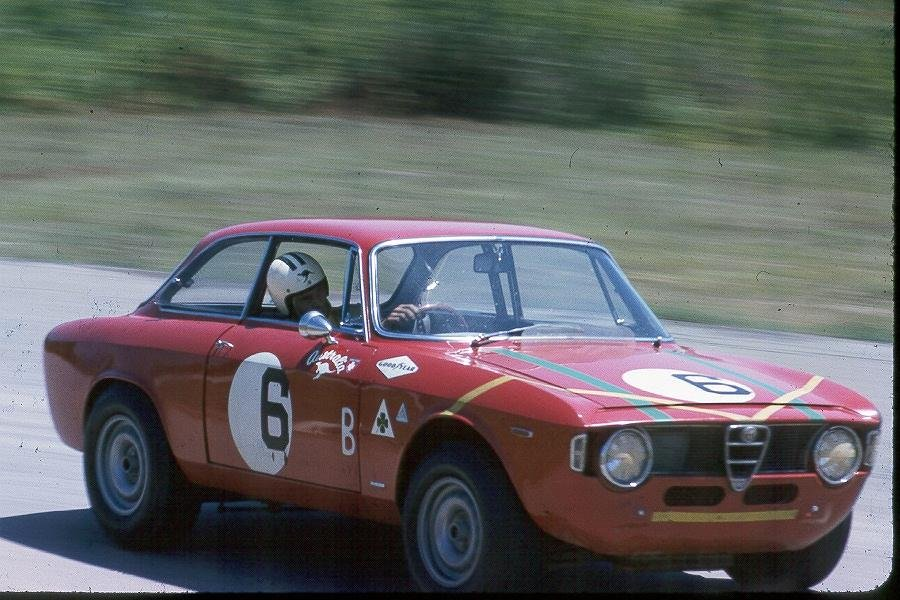
Kwech/Andrey 1966 Trans-Am Championship Alfa Romeo GTA

Kwech’s racing success in 1965 came to the attention of Alfa Romeo’s head of USA racing, and Knauz Motors was offered a chance to purchase an Autodelta-prepared GTA to campaign in the newly established SCCA Trans-Am Series, with Kwech as the lead driver. In 1966, the privateer team of Kwech and Gaston Andrey was the most successful in Trans-Am, accumulating 39 of the 57 manufacturers' points for Alfa Romeo and clinching Alfa’s Under 2 Liter Trans-Am Manufacturers' Championship. Kwech and Andrey also scored more points than any other drivers, and in 1980 were retroactively named drivers championship co-champions. Kwech used the same GTA to qualify for the 1966 SCCA American Road Racing Championship runoffs at Riverside. He went on to win the first ARRC B-Sedan National Championship in a famous race with 25 lead changes, against the Lotus Cortina of another young Aussie (but Canadian born) Allan Moffat, and was presented with the SCCA President's Cup for his outstanding drive.

Kwech and Moffat were not the only Australians who appeared in the early years of the Trans-Am series. They were joined by Frank Gardner, Harry Firth and Jim McKeown. The latter pair co-driving with Moffat on various occasions.

In 1967, Kwech formed Ausca with Ron Neal and Bill Knauz in Libertyville, Illinois. This company developed Alfa Romeo performance parts and prepared and raced Alfas in various series. In that year, he prepared and raced the Tri-Color Alfa Romeo GTA’s with Monty Winkler, and Alfa Romeo gained second place in the 1967 Under 2 Liter Trans-Am Series.

In 1968, Kwech raced for Carroll Shelby International and teamed with Allan Moffat at both the 24 Hours of Daytona and the 12 Hours of Sebring when the Trans-Am cars were allowed in the race, but retired with engine troubles within 35 laps at both races. Kwech famously got away from the start extremely well at the Sebring race after the "Le Mans" style start, his Ford Mustang was in company with the leading Porsches, Fords and Alfa Romeos, though power soon told and he quickly dropped back to be with the Trans-Am cars. Kwech also won the Riverside Trans-Am race in a Shelby-prepared Mustang. This was one of three wins for the Shelby team in Trans-Am in 1968. He continued with Shelby's Trans-Am team in 1969.

Kwech won the Under 2 liter Trans-Am Championship in 1970, driving Herb Wetanson's #3 Alfa Romeo GTA to three victories. In 1971, he ran an Alfa Romeo GTV against a strong Datsun team led by John Morton in a BRE Datsun 510.

In 1972, Kwech drove a Lola T300 for the Wetson Molica team in the L&M Continental Formula 5000 Championship. He competed in six races with a best finish of sixth at Road Atlanta.

== DeKon Engineering ==
In July 1974, Kwech and Lee Dykstra formed DeKon Engineering. The name DeKon used the D in Dykstra and the K in Kwech and was short for Design and Construction. DeKon was located in Libertyville, Illinois. Over three years, DeKon Engineering produced seventeen race cars. Of these, fourteen were Chevrolet Monzas, a few of which ended up racing in Australia in the Australian Sports Sedan and Australian GT Championships in the hands of Australian racing legends Allan Moffat, Bob Jane, Peter Brock and Allan Grice. DeKon Monzas would win the 1976 ASSC in the hands of Moffat, and both the 1984 and 1985 Australian GT Championships for Grice and veteran racer Bryan Thompson.

The DeKon Monza was designed to compete with Porsche which had dominated the IMSA Camel GT Challenge. After some teething problems the DeKon Monza of Al Holbert won the IMSA GT Championship in 1976 and 1977.

== Distinctions ==
Kwech is the only driver to win a Trans-Am race in both the Over and Under 2 liter divisions.

Kwech has been granted 17 patents and was an Active Design engineer.

== Death ==
Kwech lived in Lake Forest, Illinois, United States from 1961 until his death.
