= Alfa Romeo GTA =

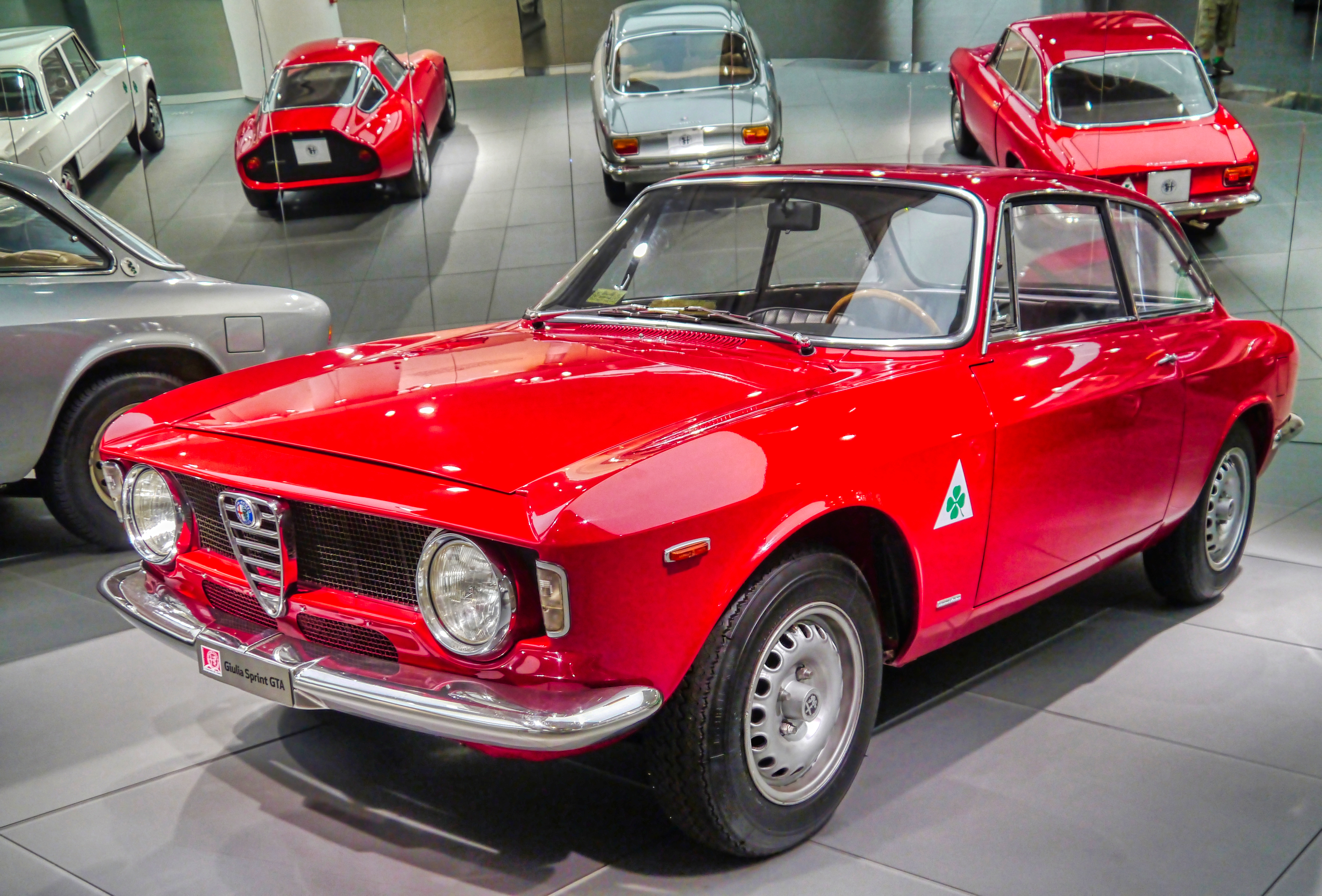
- 1965 Alfa Romeo Giulia GTA

Overview
- Manufacturer: Alfa Romeo
- Also called: Alfa Romeo Giulia GTA; Alfa Romeo Giulia Sprint GTA
- Production: 1965–1969

Body and chassis
- Class: Sports car
- Body style: 2-door coupé
- Layout: Front-engine, rear-wheel-drive

Powertrain
- Engine: Alfa Romeo Twin Cam I4
- Transmission: 5-speed manual

Chronology
- Predecessor: Alfa Romeo Giulietta Sprint (Giulia Sprint GTA); Alfa Romeo Giulia TZ (Giulia GTA)
- Successor: Alfa Romeo Alfetta GTV Turbodelta

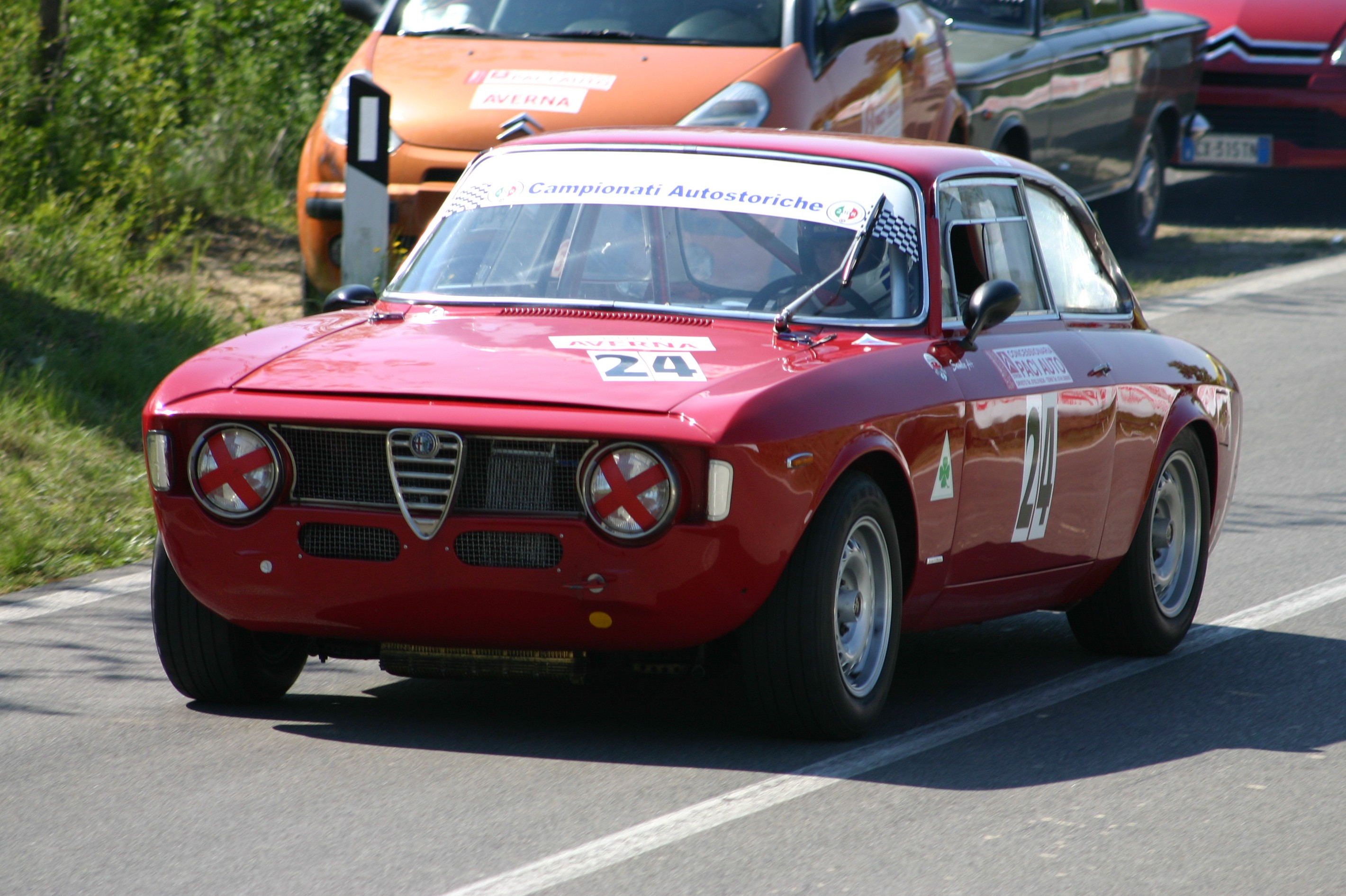
Alfa Romeo GTA in competition.

The Alfa Romeo GTA is a coupé manufactured by Italian automaker Alfa Romeo from 1965 to 1971, in both racing ("Corsa") and road ("Stradale") versions.

== Design ==
In 1962, the successor for the popular Alfa Romeo Giulietta was introduced. This car was the Giulia, internally called the Tipo 105. The 105 coupé used the shortened floor pan from the Giulia Berlina and was designed by Bertone. The name of the car evolved from the Giulia Sprint GT to the Giulia Sprint, and then to the GTJ (Junior) and GTV (Veloce) in the late 1960s.

At the time, Alfa Romeo was very active in auto racing. Autodelta, the racing division of Alfa, developed a car for competition that closely resembled the roadgoing model. These cars were named GTA, the added "A" standing for "Alleggerita", Italian for lightweight. The GTA was first produced in 1965 with a 1.6 L (1,570 cc) engine, with a 1300 Junior version being introduced later on. The GTA automobiles were available in either street (Stradale) or pure race (Corsa) trims.

The GTA had aluminium outer body panels instead of steel, and the steel inner panels were also made thinner; the inner and outer panels were bonded and pop-riveted together. Other weight reduction measures included magnesium alloy wheels, clear plastic side windows, aluminium upper control arms for the rear suspension, a magnesium valve cover, sump, timing cover and bell housing, different door handles and quarter window mechanisms, and lightweight interior trim. The GTA 1600 did not have a brake booster and had a thicker radiator than the standard vehicle; its dry weight was approximately 1,640 pounds (740 kg).

The engine had a new twin-ignition cylinder head (first called "twin plug", and then "Twin Spark" later in the 1980s) with a Marelli distributor from a Ferrari Dino and a 2-barrel 45 mm Weber carburetor instead of a 40 mm unit. The transmission gear ratios were closer than standard, and the gears themselves were machined for lightness and quicker shifting. In Stradale form, this car boasted approximately 115 PS (85 kW; 113 hp), up from 106 PS (78 kW; 105 hp), and a maximum torque of 142 N⋅m (105 lb⋅ft; 14 kg⋅m) at 3,000 rpm. In full race form, this engine could produce up to 170 PS (130 kW; 170 hp).

For homologation, 500 cars were made for racing and road use.

== GTA 1900 and GTA 2000 ==
According to Maurizio Tabucchi (an author of books on Alfa Romeo, consultant at Italian Vintage Automobile Association and at Alfa Romeo Italian Register), the GTA 2000 was a test mule for the GTAm engine (see below). The GTAm engine, using Lucas injection, developed 208 bhp (155 kW) at 6,500 rpm and was fitted to a GTA 1300 Junior chassis. Tabucchi states that the first outing of these cars was at the Tour de Corse from November 8–9, 1969. Wheels were 14x7 with Michelin PA2 or TA3 tires. The cars were entered by Autodelta and driven by Pinto and Santonacci, with their cars suffering a puncture and suspension breakage at Guitera. The other team was Barayller and Fayel, with their cars suffering clutch failure.

Tony Adriaensens also reported GTA 2000 race results, albeit later:

- Circuit of Benguela, Angola, April 10, 1970, Peixinho 1st overall
- Circuit of Cabinda, Angola, April 26, 1970, Peixinho 1st, Bandeira/Viera 2nd
- São Paulo, Brazil, May 1–3, 1970, Zambello/Fernandez 2nd
- Interlagos, Brazil, August 9, 1970, Catapani 1st overall
- Nova Lisboa, Angola, August 9–10, 1970, 6h Intercacionais do Huambo, Fraga/Resende 2nd, Santos "Peras"/Flavio Santos 3rd (car #8); both cars are described as GTA 1300 Juniors with 2-liter engines

There are some doubts as to whether the Brazilian cars were actually 2000 cc, as both Zambello and Fernandez are reported to have won events in 1969 with a GTA 1900 (which used a different 1,840 cc (1.8 L; 112.3 cu in) engine). However, their car was upgraded to 2000 cc for 1970. Regardless, given the dates of the events in Brazil, the Angolan and Brazilian cars are different.

== GTA 1300 Junior ==
Alfa Romeo GTA 1300 Junior
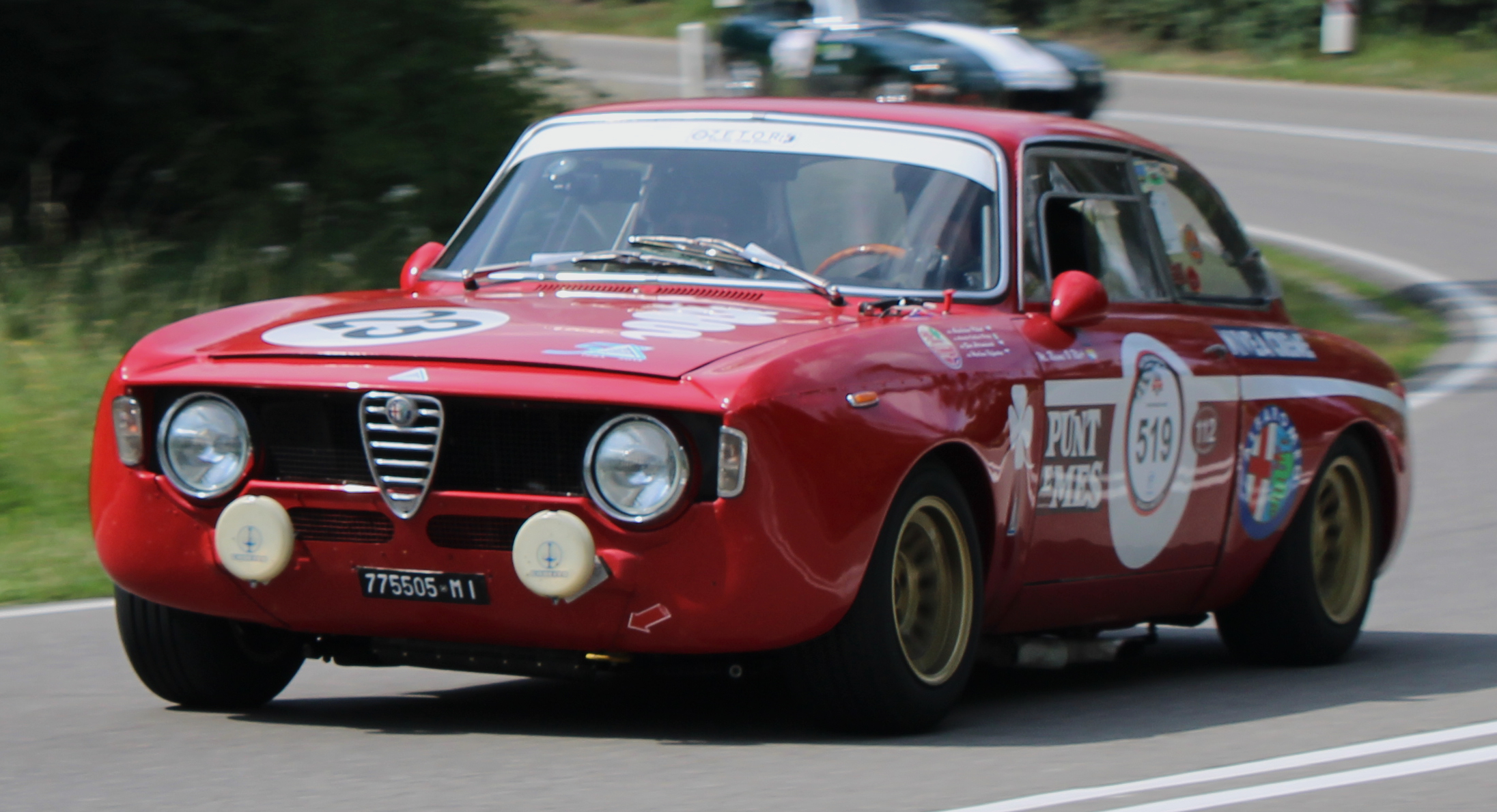

Overview
- Production: 1968–1975

Powertrain
- Engine: 1.3 L Twin Cam I4

The GTA 1300 Junior (1968–1975) had a 1300 cc engine that was based on the 1600 engine, but with a shorter-throw crankshaft. 450 GTA 1300 Juniors were produced.

The GTA Junior in Stradale form lacked many of the lightweight features of the 1600 GTA, such as the plastic windows, magnesium engine components, and alloy wheels. The engine initially produced 96 PS (71 kW; 95 hp), but was soon upgraded to 110 PS (81 kW; 110 hp). Autodelta-prepared fuel-injected racing cars produced 165 PS (121 kW; 163 hp).

== GTAm ==
Alfa Romeo GTAm
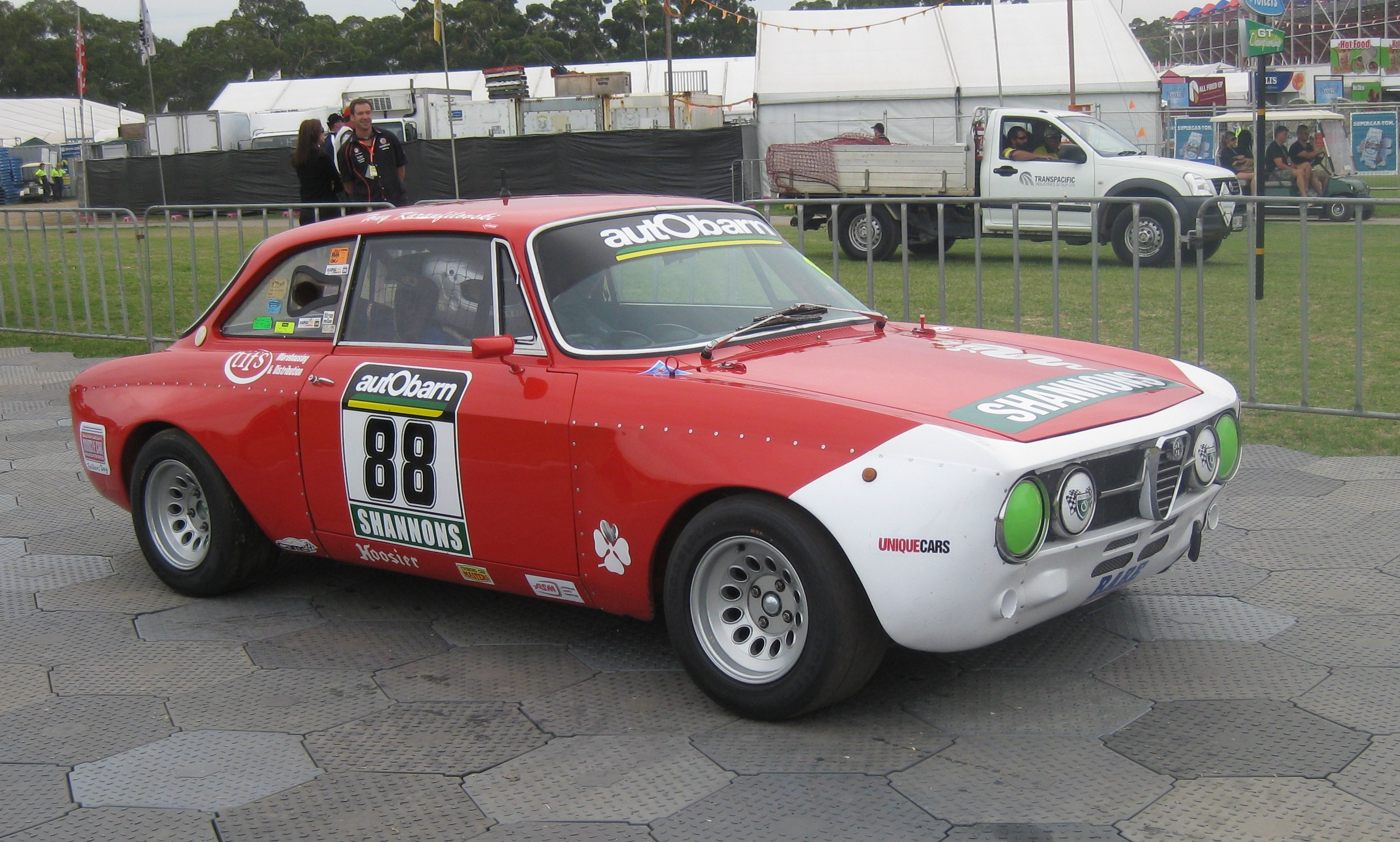

Overview
- Production: 1969–1973

Powertrain
- Engine: 2.0 L Twin Cam I4

External images
- 1970 Alfa Romeo 2000 GTAm
- 1971 Alfa Romeo GTAm

The 1750 GTAm could produce up to 240 PS (180 kW; 240 hp) with a 1985 cc engine—a car usually related to the GTA, but unlike the GTA derived from the GTV 1750 (US version). The 1750 GTAm (later called 2000 GTAm for marketing reasons, when the 2000 GTV was introduced) was created in 1969. Which chassis were built when is listed in the link to the "Alleggerita" book and "alfabb" website.

There are three schools of thought about the "Am" moniker, neither having ever been officially confirmed by Alfa Romeo:

- GT Alesaggio Maggiorato (Italian: increased bore)
- GT Alleggerita Modificata (Italian: lightened modified)
- GT America

The car had a full steel body modified with aluminium and plastic parts. Because of a minimum weight increase in 1971 up from 920 to 940 kg (2,030 to 2,070 lb), the GTAms had less of a need for lighter-weight aluminium and plastic parts.

The base for the GTAm was the US-market version of the 1750 GTV with a SPICA mechanical fuel injection system. This 1750 GTV US version is known as the Giulia Type 105.51. Autodelta built 1750 GTAms for both the works team and customer teams. They had a chassis number starting with #153XXXX. Most works and customer Autodelta cars had SPICA injection, although a different version was made for racing.

The European market 1750 GTV (with dual carburetors) was also used to build a 1750 GTAm. Some say that the 2000 GTV and the GT 1300 GT Junior bodyshells were used as well. Some racing teams and private workshops also ordered parts from Autodelta and other tuners and assembled the GTAm themselves on a new or existing body shell.

The original 1750 engine block (actually 1779 cc) was used, and inserting a monosleeve instead of four individual cylinder liners increased displacement to 1,985 cc (2.0 L; 121.1 cu in) and later to 1,999 cc (2.0 L; 122.0 cu in) to participate in the 2000 cc class, explaining the "maggiorato".

According to the sources, some 40 GTAms were built by Autodelta and by private workshops. This number is difficult to verify, as the GTAms lacked their own specific chassis numbering scheme.

In the second revised edition of the book Alleggerita (written by Tony Adriaensens, Patrick Dasse & Martin Übelher), published in 2012 by Dingwort Verlag in Germany, you will find the most complete list available of GTAms.

A complete and regularly updated list of the 1750 / 2000 GTAms can be found here: https://www.alfabb.com/threads/gtam-chassisnumbers.162337/page-25#post-8807697

== GTA-SA ==
Alfa Romeo GTA-SA

Overview
- Production: 1967–1968

Powertrain
- Engine: 1.6 L supercharged Twin Cam I4

External image
- Alfa Romeo Giulia GTA SA

The Giulia 1600 GTA-SA (sovralimentato, "supercharged") (1967–1968) was a rare racing car, of which ten examples were built. It featured a 1570 cc twin-ignition engine with two oil-driven superchargers, and could produce up to 250 PS (184 kW; 247 hp) at 7,500 rpm. The GTA-SA was built for FIA Group 5 racing in Europe, and won first place overall in the Hockenheim 100-mile endurance race in 1967 in the hands of German driver Siegfried Dau. In the Netherlands, Rob Slotemaker and Nico Chiotakis also drove the GTA-SA.

== Competition history ==
Both the GTA 1300 Junior and the GTAm were very successful, being driven to numerous victories. In its first season taking part in the European Touring Car Championship, it took all of the first seven places at the round held at Monza. Andrea de Adamich claimed the ETCC title in 1966 and 1967. The Alfa Romeo GTAm won further ETCC titles in 1970 and 1971.

The 1750 GTAm and the 2000 GTAm cars were driven to victory by Toine Hezemans, who won the 24 hours of Francorchamps with this car. These cars won hundreds of races before competition grew stronger in 1971. But the Giulia sometimes kept up with much bigger engined cars such as the 3-litre BMW CSL.

In the USA the GTA's first racing victory was in January 1966 at the “Refrigerator Bowl”, at the now defunct Marlboro Raceway in Maryland, with Monty Winkler and Pete Van der Vate at the wheel. The Autodelta GTA of Horst Kwech and Gaston Andrey won the under-2-litre class of the inaugural SCCA Trans-Am championship in 1966. Kwech also won the first SCCA National B-Sedan ARRC Championship in the same GTA in 1966. The GTA would also go on to win the 1970 championship.

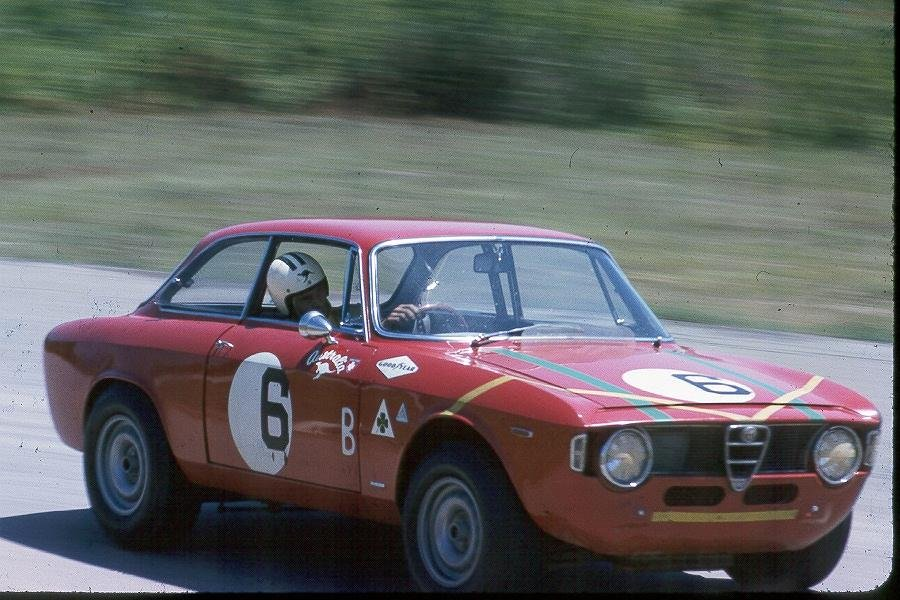
Kwech/Andrey 1966 Trans-Am Championship GTA

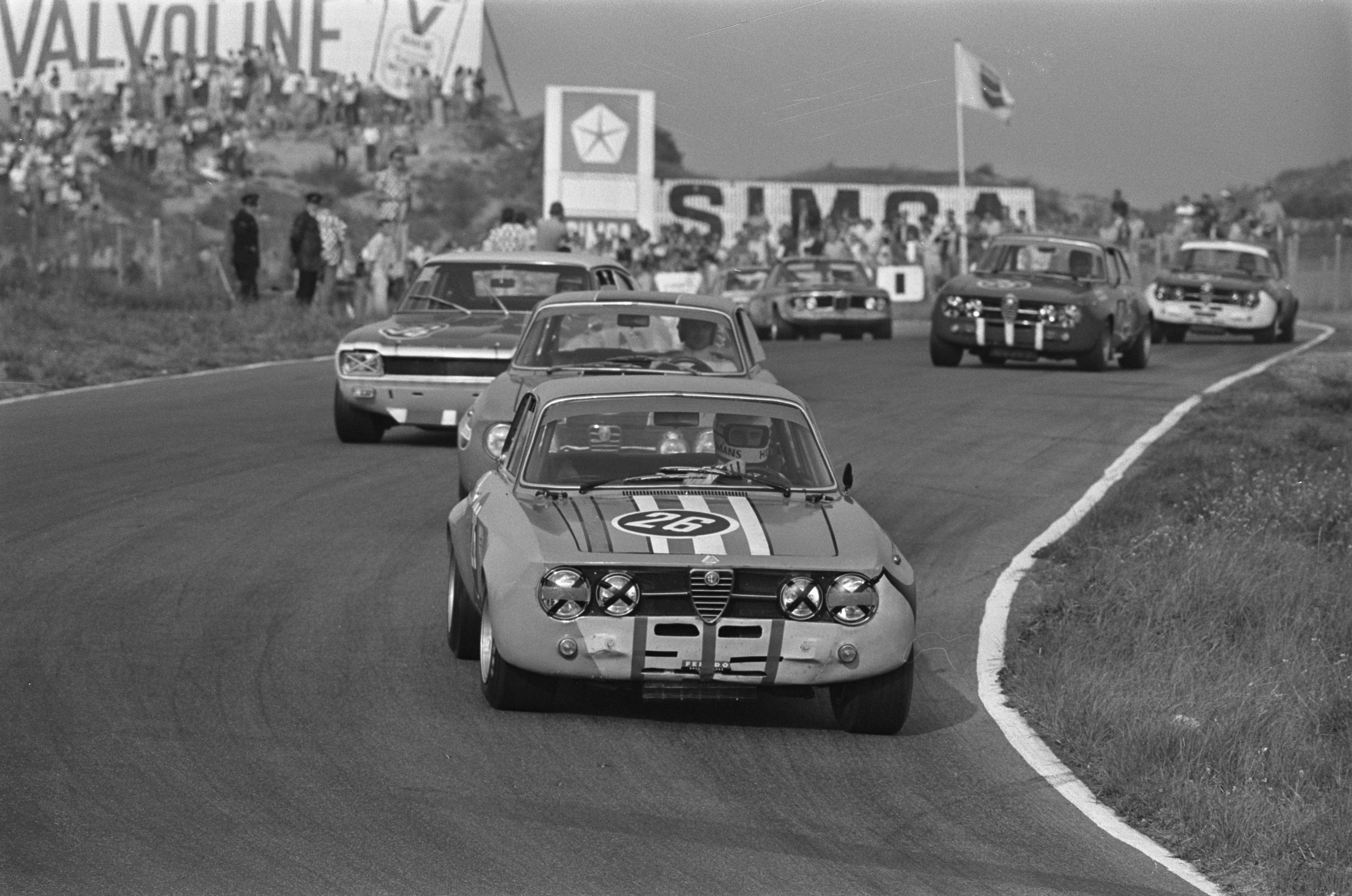
Toine Hezemans, winner of the European Touring Car Championship 1970, at Zandvoort in 1970

== Technical data ==
GTA:	Giulia Sprint GTA	Giulia Sprint GTA (racing version)	Giulia GTA 1300 Junior	Giulia GTA 1300 Junior (racing version)	GTA SA	GTAm
Engine:	Inline-4
Displacement:	1,570 cc (1.6 L; 95.8 cu in)		1,290 cc (1.3 L; 78.7 cu in)		1,570 cc (1.6 L; 95.8 cu in)	1,985 cc (2.0 L; 121.1 cu in)
Bore x stroke:	78 mm (3.07 in) x 82 mm (3.23 in)		78 mm (3.07 in) x 67.5 mm (2.66 in)		78 mm (3.07 in) x 82 mm (3.23 in)	84.5 mm (3.33 in) x 88.5 mm (3.48 in)
Power:	115 PS (85 kW; 113 hp)	164 PS (121 kW; 162 hp)	96 PS (71 kW; 95 hp)	180 PS (132 kW; 178 hp)	220 PS (162 kW; 217 hp)	240 PS (177 kW; 237 hp)
at rpm:	6000	7800	6000	9300	7800	7500
Compression ratio:	9,7 : 1	10,5 : 1	9,7 : 1	11,0 : 1	10,5 : 1	11,0 : 1
Valves per cylinder:	2			4	2
Valvetrain:	DOHC Double overhead camshaft
Transmission:	5-speed gearbox
Brakes:	Disc brakes all around
Suspension front:	Independent suspension, wishbones, coil springs, anti-roll bar
Suspension rear:	Live axle, trailing arms, coil springs, telescopic dampers
Body:	two-door, aluminum panels over steel monocoque					two-door from steel
Weight:	820 kg (1,810 lb)	760 kg (1,680 lb)	920 kg (2,030 lb)	760 kg (1,680 lb)		920 kg (2,030 lb)
Top speed:	185 km/h (115 mph)	220 km/h (137 mph)	175 km/h (109 mph)	210 km/h (130 mph)	240 km/h (149 mph)	230 km/h (143 mph)
Construction:	1965–1969		1968–1975		1967–1968	1970–1971
Quantity:	500		193	300	10	40

== Modern GTAs ==
The GTA designation was revived in the 2000s for the highest performance road-going versions of the 156 and 147. These cars are powered by 3.2-litre Alfa Romeo Busso V6 engines, giving them the most power of the cars in the model range. However, despite the GTA name, they are also generally the heaviest due to having large engines and little, if any, weight saving employed in their construction. For example, the 147 GTA weighs the most out of all versions of the 147, at 1,360 kg (2,998 lb).

=== 147 GTA ===
The 147 GTA was introduced in 2002 as the top-end hatchback model for Alfa Romeo. It is powered by a 3.2-litre V6, derived from the 164 from the early 90s. It is a two-door hatchback that seats five, and is characterized by its wider wheel arches, telephone dial-style 17 inch wheels, and more aggressive grille design.

=== 156 GTA ===
The 156 GTA was Alfa Romeo's sportiest version of the 156, and used the same 3.2-litre V6 as the 147 GTA, producing 250 PS (184 kW; 247 hp) and 300 N⋅m (220 lb⋅ft) of torque. This four-door saloon was available in sedan or wagon versions.

=== MiTo GTA ===
The MiTo GTA prototype has a turbocharged 1.75-litre straight-4, producing 240 PS (177 kW; 237 hp). Plans for production were dashed by the 2008 financial crisis.

=== Giulia GTA and GTAm ===
Introduced in 2020, the Giulia GTA and GTAm are limited editions of the 2015 Giulia, with a total of 500 cars produced.

== See also ==
- Alfa Romeo 105/115 Series Coupés
- Alfa Romeo in motorsport
- Alfa Romeo in Formula One
- Alfa Corse

== Sources ==
- Adriaensens, Tony (1994). Alleggerita. Belgium: Corsa Research vzw. ISBN 90-801197-1-7.
- Adriaensens & Dasse, Tony & Patrick (2012). Alleggerita. Hamburg, Germany: Dingwort Verlag. ISBN 978-3-87166-065-8.
- Tipler, John (2003). Alfa Romeo Giulia Coupe Gt & Gta. Veloce Publishing. ISBN 1-903706-47-5.
- Tabucchi, Maurizio (1994). Alfa Romeo GTA. Italy: Giorgio Nada Editore. ISBN 88-7911-132-9.
- Tabucchi, Maurizio (2009). Alfa Romeo GTA "leggera e vincente". Giorgio Nada Editore, Italy. ISBN 978-88-7911-470-7.
- D'Amico, Stefano; Tabucchi, Maurizio (2007). Alfa Romeo Production Cars from 1910. Italy: Giunti/Giorgio Nada Editore. ISBN 978-88-7911-408-0.
- Fusi, Luigi (1978). Alfa Romeo—Tutte le vetture dal 1910—All cars from 1910. Milan: Emmeti Grafica editrice. ASIN B001NF7RUC.
