= 1966 United States Road Racing Championship =

Seasons
- ← 1965 1967 →

The 1966 United States Road Racing Championship season was the fourth season of the Sports Car Club of America's United States Road Racing Championship. It began April 24, 1966, and ended September 4, 1966, after eight races. GT cars were dropped from the program; only the two sports car classes were run. Chuck Parsons won the season championship.

== Schedule ==
Rnd	Race	Length	Circuit	Location	Date
1	Stardust Grand Prix	180 mi (290 km)	Stardust International Raceway	Las Vegas, Nevada	April 24
2	Riverside 300	300 km (190 mi)	Riverside International Raceway	Riverside, California	May 1
3	Monterey 150	150 mi (240 km)	Laguna Seca Raceway	Monterey, California	May 8
4	Bridgehampton 200	200 mi (320 km)	Bridgehampton Race Circuit	Bridgehampton, New York	May 22
5	Sports Car Grand Prix at Watkins Glen	200 mi (320 km)	Watkins Glen Grand Prix Race Course	Watkins Glen, New York	June 26
6	Pacific North West Grand Prix	250 km (160 mi)	Pacific Raceways	Kent, Washington	July 30
7	Buckeye Cup	200 mi (320 km)	Mid-Ohio Sports Car Course	Lexington, Ohio	August 28
8	Road America 500	500 mi (800 km)	Road America	Elkhart Lake, Wisconsin	September 4

== Season results ==
Overall winner in bold.

Rnd	Circuit	Over 2.0 Winning Team	Under 2.0 Winning Team	Results
Rnd	Circuit	Over 2.0 Winning Driver(s)	Under 2.0 Winning Driver(s)	Results
1	Stardust	**#62 Dan Blocker Racing**	#34 Otto Zipper	Results
1	Stardust	(Canada) **John Cannon**	(United Kingdom) Ken Miles	Results
2	Riverside	**#26 Lola-Chevrolet**	#33 Otto Zipper	Results
2	Riverside	(United States) **John Fulp**	(United States) Scooter Patrick	Results
3	Laguna Seca	**#97 McLaren Elva-Chevrolet**	#34 Otto Zipper	Results
3	Laguna Seca	(United States) **Charlie Hayes**	(United Kingdom) Ken Miles	Results
4	Bridgehampton	**#8 All American Racers**	#33 Otto Zipper	Results
4	Bridgehampton	(United States) **Jerry Grant**	(United States) Scooter Patrick	Results
5	Watkins Glen	**#26 Lola-Chevrolet**	#56 Ralph Trieschmann	Results
5	Watkins Glen	(United States) **John Fulp**	(United States) Ralph Trieschmann	Results
6	Kent	**#16 Roger Penske Racing**	#60 Porsche Cars Pacific, Inc.	Results
6	Kent	(United States) **Mark Donohue**	(United States) Don Wester	Results
7	Mid-Ohio	**#96 Dan Blocker Racing**	#7 Porsche of America	Results
7	Mid-Ohio	(United States) **Lothar Motschenbacher**	(United States) Joe Buzzetta	Results
8	Road America	**#10 Randy Hilton**	#7 Porsche of America	Results
8	Road America	(United States) **Chuck Parsons**	(United States) Joe Buzzetta (Germany) Günter Klass	Results
