= 1967 United States Road Racing Championship =

Seasons
- ← 1966 1968 →

The 1967 United States Road Racing Championship season was the fifth season of the Sports Car Club of America's United States Road Racing Championship. It began April 23, 1967, and ended August 20, 1967, after eight races. Mark Donohue won the season championship.

== Schedule ==
Rnd	Race	Length	Circuit	Location	Date
1	Stardust Grand Prix	180 mi (290 km)	Stardust International Raceway	Las Vegas, Nevada	April 23
2	Riverside 300	300 km (190 mi)	Riverside International Raceway	Riverside, California	April 30
3	Laguna Seca 250	250 mi (400 km)	Laguna Seca Raceway	Monterey, California	May 7
4	Bridgehampton 200	200 mi (320 km)	Bridgehampton Race Circuit	Bridgehampton, New York	May 21
5	Sports Car Grand Prix at Watkins Glen	200 mi (320 km)	Watkins Glen Grand Prix Race Course	Watkins Glen, New York	June 25
6	Pacific North West Grand Prix	250 km (160 mi)	Pacific Raceways	Kent, Washington	July 16
7	Road America 500	500 mi (800 km)	Road America	Elkhart Lake, Wisconsin	July 30
8	Lexington 200	200 mi (320 km)	Mid-Ohio Sports Car Course	Lexington, Ohio	August 20

== Season results ==
Overall winners in bold.

Rnd	Circuit	Over 2.0 Winning Team	Under 2.0 Winning Team	Results
Rnd	Circuit	Over 2.0 Winning Driver(s)	Under 2.0 Winning Driver(s)	Results
1	Stardust	**#6 Roger Penske Racing**	Porsche	Results
1	Stardust	(United States) **Mark Donohue**	(United States) Ed Bowman	Results
2	Riverside	**#6 Roger Penske Racing**	#33 Otto Zipper	Results
2	Riverside	(United States) **Mark Donohue**	(United States) Scooter Patrick	Results
3	Laguna Seca	**#11 Motschenbacher Racing**	#22 Baker Racing Team	Results
3	Laguna Seca	(Germany) **Lothar Motschenbacher**	(United States) Fred Baker	Results
4	Bridgehampton	**#6 Roger Penske Racing**	#15 Herb Wetson	Results
4	Bridgehampton	(United States) **Mark Donohue**	(United States) Bruce Jennings	Results
5	Watkins Glen	**#6 Roger Penske Racing**	#7 Joe Buzzetta	Results
5	Watkins Glen	(United States) **Mark Donohue**	(United States) Joe Buzzetta	Results
6	Kent	**#6 Roger Penske Racing**	#33 Otto Zipper	Results
6	Kent	(United States) **Mark Donohue**	(United States) Scooter Patrick	Results
7	Road America	**#26 Carl Haas Racing**	#7 Joe Buzzetta	Results
7	Road America	(United States) **Chuck Parsons** (United States) **Skip Scott**	(United States) Joe Buzzetta (United States) Scooter Patrick	Results
8	Mid-Ohio	**#6 Roger Penske Racing**	#7 Joe Buzzetta	Results
8	Mid-Ohio	(United States) **Mark Donohue**	(United States) Joe Buzzetta	Results
