= 1968 United States Road Racing Championship =

Seasons
- ← 1967 1998 →

The 1968 United States Road Racing Championship season was the sixth and final season of the Sports Car Club of America's United States Road Racing Championship. It began March 31, 1968, and ended August 18, 1968, after nine races. Mark Donohue won the season championship. The series would be revived thirty years later, but only for two years before becoming the Grand American Road Racing Championship.

== Schedule ==
Rnd	Race	Length	Circuit	Location	Date
1	USRRC Mexico City	150 mi (240 km)	Autódromo Hermanos Rodríguez	Mexico City, Mexico	March 31
2	USRRC Riverside	250 km (160 mi)	Riverside International Raceway	Riverside, California	April 28
3	Pimm's Cup Trophy	150 mi (240 km)	Laguna Seca Raceway	Monterey, California	May 5
4	Vanderbilt Cup	170 mi (270 km)	Bridgehampton Race Circuit	Bridgehampton, New York	May 19
5	Championnat Nord-Americain	2 Hours, 45 Minutes	Circuit Mont-Tremblant	Saint-Jovite, Quebec	June 2
6	Pacific North West Grand Prix	250 km (160 mi)	Pacific Raceways	Kent, Washington	June 30
7	Watkins Glen Sports Car Road Race	200 mi (320 km)	Watkins Glen Grand Prix Race Course	Watkins Glen, New York	July 13
8	Road America 500	500 mi (800 km)	Road America	Elkhart Lake, Wisconsin	July 28
9	USRRC Mid-Ohio	180 mi (290 km)	Mid-Ohio Sports Car Course	Lexington, Ohio	August 18

== Season results ==
Overall winners in bold.

Rnd	Circuit	Over 2.0 Winning Team	Under 2.0 Winning Team	Results
Rnd	Circuit	Over 2.0 Winning Driver(s)	Under 2.0 Winning Driver(s)	Results
1	Mexico City	**#99 Aztec Racing**	Werner Frank	Results
1	Mexico City	(Mexico) **Moisés Solana**	(United States) Werner Frank	Results
2	Riverside	**#6 Roger Penske Racing**	#60 Otto Zipper	Results
2	Riverside	(United States) **Mark Donohue**	(United States) Don Wester	Results
3	Laguna Seca	**#6 Roger Penske Racing**	#33 Otto Zipper	Results
3	Laguna Seca	(United States) **Mark Donohue**	(United States) Scooter Patrick	Results
4	Bridgehampton	**#26 Carl Haas Racing**	#66 Werner Frank	Results
4	Bridgehampton	(United States) **Skip Scott**	(United States) Werner Frank	Results
5	St. Jovite	**#6 Roger Penske Racing**	#37 Altona Motors	Results
5	St. Jovite	(United States) **Mark Donohue**	(Canada) Horst Kroll	Results
6	Kent	**#26 Carl Haas Racing**	#4 Porsche	Results
6	Kent	(United States) **Skip Scott**	(United States) Lew Florence	Results
7	Watkins Glen	**#6 Roger Penske Racing**	#88 Werner Frank	Results
7	Watkins Glen	(United States) **Mark Donohue**	(United States) Werner Frank	Results
8	Road America	**#26 Carl Haas Racing**	#12 C.L. Phillips	Results
8	Road America	(United States) **Skip Scott** (United States) **Chuck Parsons**	(United States) Cliff Phillips (United States) Al Cervenka	Results
9	Mid-Ohio	**#6 Roger Penske Racing**	#69 E.L. Hall	Results
9	Mid-Ohio	(United States) **Mark Donohue**	(United States) Mike Hall	Results
