= 1970 24 Hours of Le Mans =

38th 24 Hours of Le Mans endurance race

Previous: 1969	Next: 1971
Index: Races | Winners

The 1970 24 Hours of Le Mans was a motor race staged on 13 and 14 June 1970 at the Circuit de la Sarthe in France. It was the eighth race of the 1970 International Championship for Makes and was the 38th running of the 24 Hours of Le Mans. The race was contested by Group 4 Special GT cars, Group 5 Sports Cars and Group 6 Prototypes.

Once again Porsche had a dominant year in the championship and arrived as strong favourites to take their first outright victory in the Le Mans race. Their main opposition would come from Ferrari, now competing with a newly-homologated 512S model. Nine 917s and eleven 512s from works-supported teams and privateers were entered. However heavy rain through most of the race neutralised much of their power and contributed to a number of serious accidents. In a race of heavy attrition where only seven cars were classified as finishers it was won by race veteran Hans Herrmann and co-driver Richard ‘Dickie’ Attwood.

For Herrmann, a veteran of 13 Le Mans, it was particularly sweet having lost by the narrowest margin the previous year. All Porsche's main challengers (Ferrari, Matra, Alfa Romeo) were beaten in the first half of the race. Porsche's dominance was complete – winning all three prizes and taking all the class-wins. The only dark spot was Ickx's accident at the Ford Chicane during the night which killed a track marshal.

This was the year that Hollywood came to Le Mans. The race provided the background for the Steve McQueen movie Le Mans. Some of the racing footage (mainly the first moments of the race) of the motion picture was taken from on board a competing car, as the #29 Porsche 908-022 entered by Solar Productions had been fitted with movie cameras but most of the on board footage was useless due to technical issues.

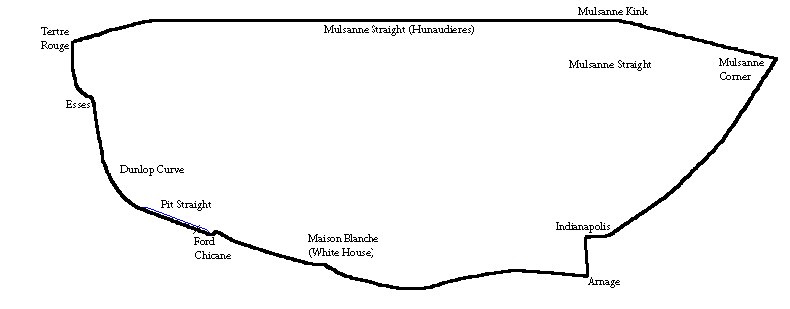
Le Mans in 1970

== Regulations ==
After only four years, the CSI (Commission Sportive Internationale - the FIA’s regulations body) overhauled its FIA Appendix J, redefining again the motorsport categories. GT cars were now extended to Group 3 (minimum production of 1000 cars) and Group 4 for ‘Special GT cars’ (min. =500). The former Group 4 for Sports Cars became the new Group 5 (min. = 25) while Prototypes stayed as Group 6. The 5-litre engine limit on the Sports Cars remained – allowing the Porsche 917 and new Ferrari 512 to race, although they were on notice that this would fall to a 3-litre limit for the start of the 1972 season.

The Automobile Club de l'Ouest (ACO) was now fully aligned with the FIA's technical regulations. They also made changes to its race regulations. Three drivers were now permitted in each car, and a driver was allowed to switch (once) to another car of the same make during the race. Maximum drive-times were set at 14 hours, in up to 240 minutes at a time with at least a one-hour break between shifts. Night-time, when headlights had to be used, was defined as between 21:00 & 04:30 and luminous car numbers were introduced. Mechanical restrictions remained – a 25-lap distance between oil replenishment and only 4 crew could work on a car on the pit-apron. Finally, every car had to complete the final lap within fifteen minutes to be classified. The most significant change was the abolition of the famous “Le Mans start”: running across the track to get in and start the car. This year the cars would still line up in echelon however the drivers would start in the cars fully strapped in (a full race harness now became compulsory). A line of four flagmen would now simultaneously wave le tricolore when drivers would start their cars and pull away.

Another 12 km of Armco was added to the track completing the project started the previous year to encircle the track with safety barriers. Also, the Esses and Tertre Rouge corners were widened and resurfaced.

== Entries ==
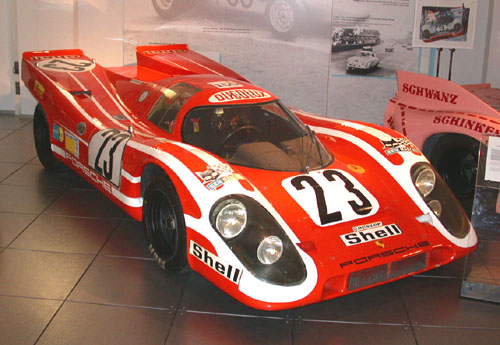
The winning Porsche 917K of Herrmann/Attwood

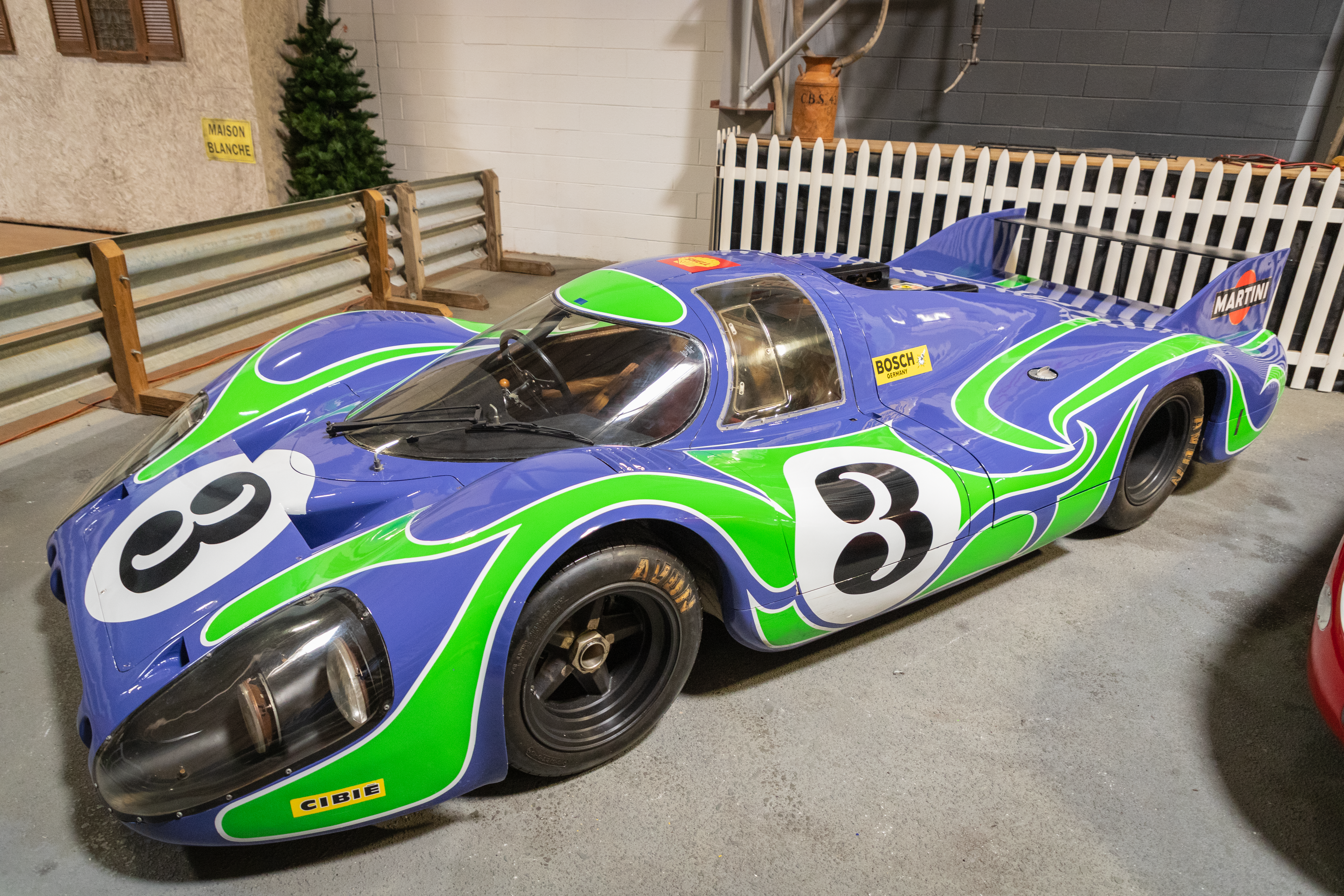
Martini Racing 917L in blue-green "psychedelic" livery, which placed 2nd overall driven by Larrousse/Kauhsen

This year there were 96 entries for the race, to which the ACO accepted 62 for qualifying. In the end 57 arrived for scrutineering in a very even split between the Prototypes, Sports and GT cars. Nearly a third were just the very powerful Porsche 917 or Ferrari 512 strongly increasing public interest. Significant absentees this year were Ford and Alpine. With such a strong entry list the ACO decided it could drop the smaller 1.3- and 1.6-litre classes for the first time post-war.

Category	Classes	Prototype Group 6	Sports Group 5	GT Groups 3+4	Total entries
Large-engines	>2.5L classes	12 (+1 reserve)	21	2	35 (+1 reserve)
Medium-engines	2.0 / 2.5L classes	4 (+1 reserve)	1 (+2 reserves)	6 (+7 reserves)	11 (+10 reserves)
Total cars		16 (+2 reserves)	22 (+2 reserves)	8 (+7 reserves)	46 (+11 reserves)

After an inauspicious debut in 1969, extensive work was done by Porsche to fix the stability and reliability of the 917. After being beaten by a supposedly obsolete car, Porsche contracted John Wyer and his Gulf-J.W. Automotive Engineering Team to become the official works-supported team and development partner. During tests in Zeltweg, Wyer's engineer John Horsmann had the idea to increase downforce at the expense of drag, and so a new short tail was moulded with aluminium sheets taped together. This worked well as the new tail gave the 917 better stability. The new version was called the 917K (kurzheck or ‘short-tail’). A new aerodynamic version was developed for Le Mans with support from the external consultant Robert Choulet. The 917 L (langheck) featured a spectacular new "long tail" body with a wing, which had very low drag. They were dubbed “batmobiles” by the media. Two engines were available: the 4.5-litre flat-12 now capable of 550 bhp, and a new 4.9-litre version (590 bhp). Most drivers preferred driving the K even though it gave away as much as 25 km/h (15 mph) in top speed. The langheck was less stable and needed far more concentration to keep on the track.

Porsche's works drivers had been inherited by the JWAE team who fielded three 917Ks. The lead car was driven by Jo Siffert and Brian Redman who had already won two rounds in the championship. Pedro Rodriguez (Le Mans winner in 1968 for Wyer) and Leo Kinnunen, in the second car, had won three races. Brits David Hobbs and Mike Hailwood, who had driven Wyer's Ford the previous year, had the third car with a 4.5-litre engine. A fourth JWA 917K entry was not accepted - the drivers were to have been actor Steve McQueen and reigning F1 world champion Jackie Stewart.

As Ford had done several years earlier, Porsche also supported a rival, second works team based in Austria (much to Wyer's surprise). The new Porsche Salzburg was run by Louise Piëch, sister of Ferry Porsche and mother of company Technical Director Ferdinand Piëch. Vic Elford/Kurt Ahrens ran the 4.9-litre 917L, while Swiss-pairing Rico Steinemann/Dieter Spoerry and veterans Hans Herrmann/Richard Attwood had 4.5-litre Ks.

The Martini Racing customer team also gained some support from Porsche AG, being the other runner of a 917L for Gérard Larrousse/ Willi Kauhsen. The spectacular livery of this car was an elaborate scheme of whirls and swoops of green on a blue background. The car gained the nickname of the Hippie Car or the Psychedelic Porsche from the team and the media and started the Le Mans tradition of the “art-car” special. The final 917 was co-entered by its owner, the Finnish AAW Racing Team, and British privateer David Piper. With Gijs van Lennep as driver, that 917 had already proven very competitive through the championship year.

In June 1969, Enzo Ferrari had sold half of his company to Fiat and that money was able to finance, like Porsche, the construction of the required 25 cars of its new Group 5 car: the Ferrari 512S. Based on the 612, Ferrari's Group 7 Can-Am car, it had a 5.0L V12 developing 550 bhp. After a victory at Sebring the car had improved reliability and an aerodynamic long-tail version (coda lunga) was built. Eight such cars were prepared for Le Mans. Four were in the works team, led by their two F1 drivers Jacky Ickx and Clay Regazzoni, paired with hill-climb specialist Peter Schetty and Arturo Merzario respectively. Ickx was carrying an injury after escaping from a burning car at the Spanish GP and then suffering a fuel leak at Spa just two weeks ago. In the other cars were Le Mans winner Nino Vaccarella with Ignazio Giunti and young F1 drivers Derek Bell and Ronnie Peterson. Bell replaced Jean Guichet who had been injured in a road accident and missing his first Le Mans since 1959.

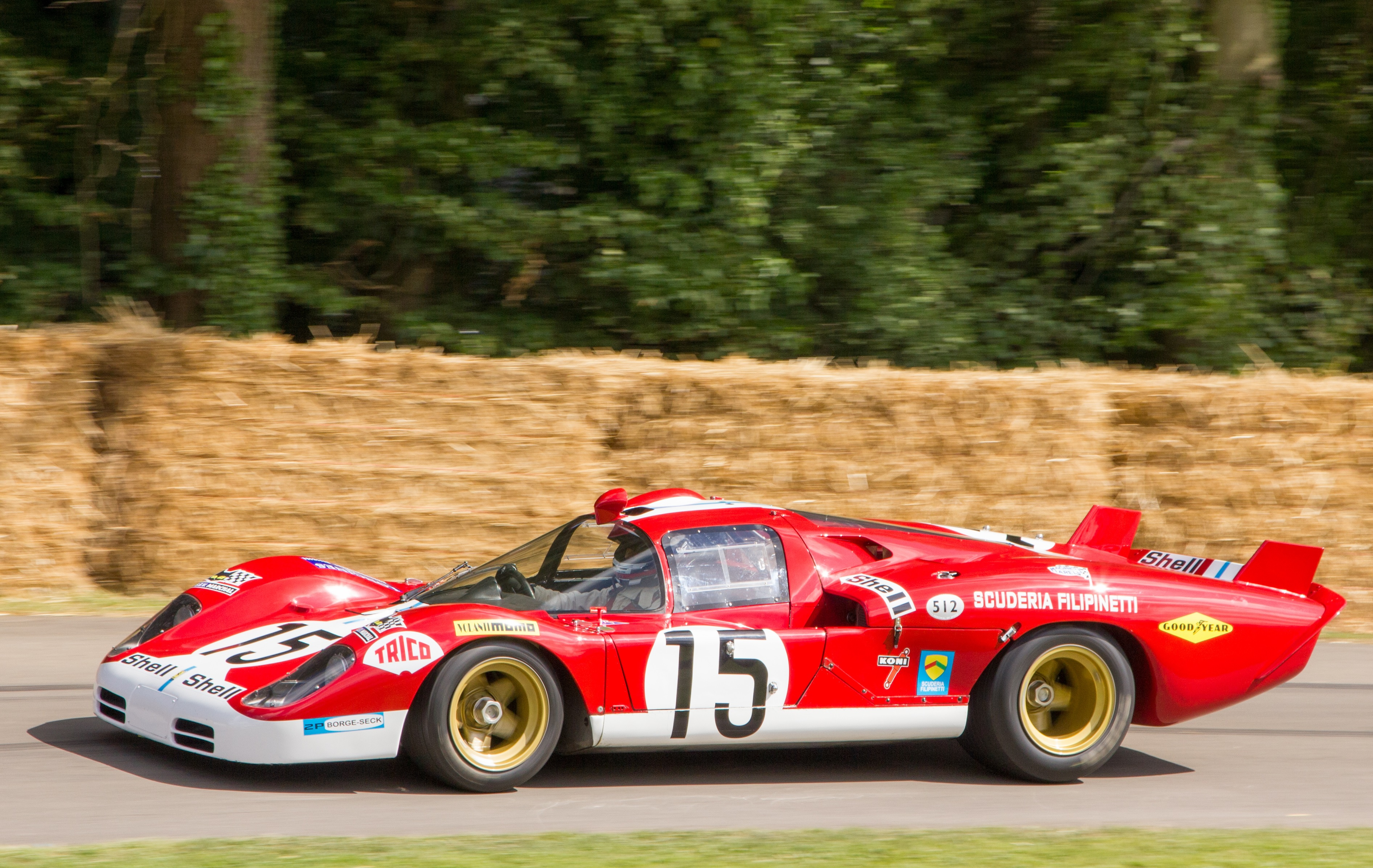
Ferrari 512 S entered by Scuderia Filipinetti and driven by Parkes and Müller

Ferrari customer teams were also equipped with the 512S. Scuderia Filipinetti had three cars led by experienced drivers. Mike Parkes/Herbert Müller and Swedes Jo Bonnier/Reine Wisell in longtails; and Italians Gianpiero Moretti/Corrado Manfredini (and his Scuderia Picchio Rosso). The North American Racing Team (NART) had two: a longtail driven by Americans Sam Posey/Ronnie Bucknum, and a standard for Helmut Kelleners/Georg Loos (and his Gelo Racing Team). Former regulars Ecurie Francorchamps also entered a longtail, returning after a four-year absence. There was also an entry for the new Spanish Escuderia Montjuich team who ran the open-top “spyder” variant.

The only other cars in the big Group 5 class were a pair of Lola T70s. However, even with the 5-litre Chevrolet developing almost 500 bhp, they were no longer any match for the Porsches and Ferraris.

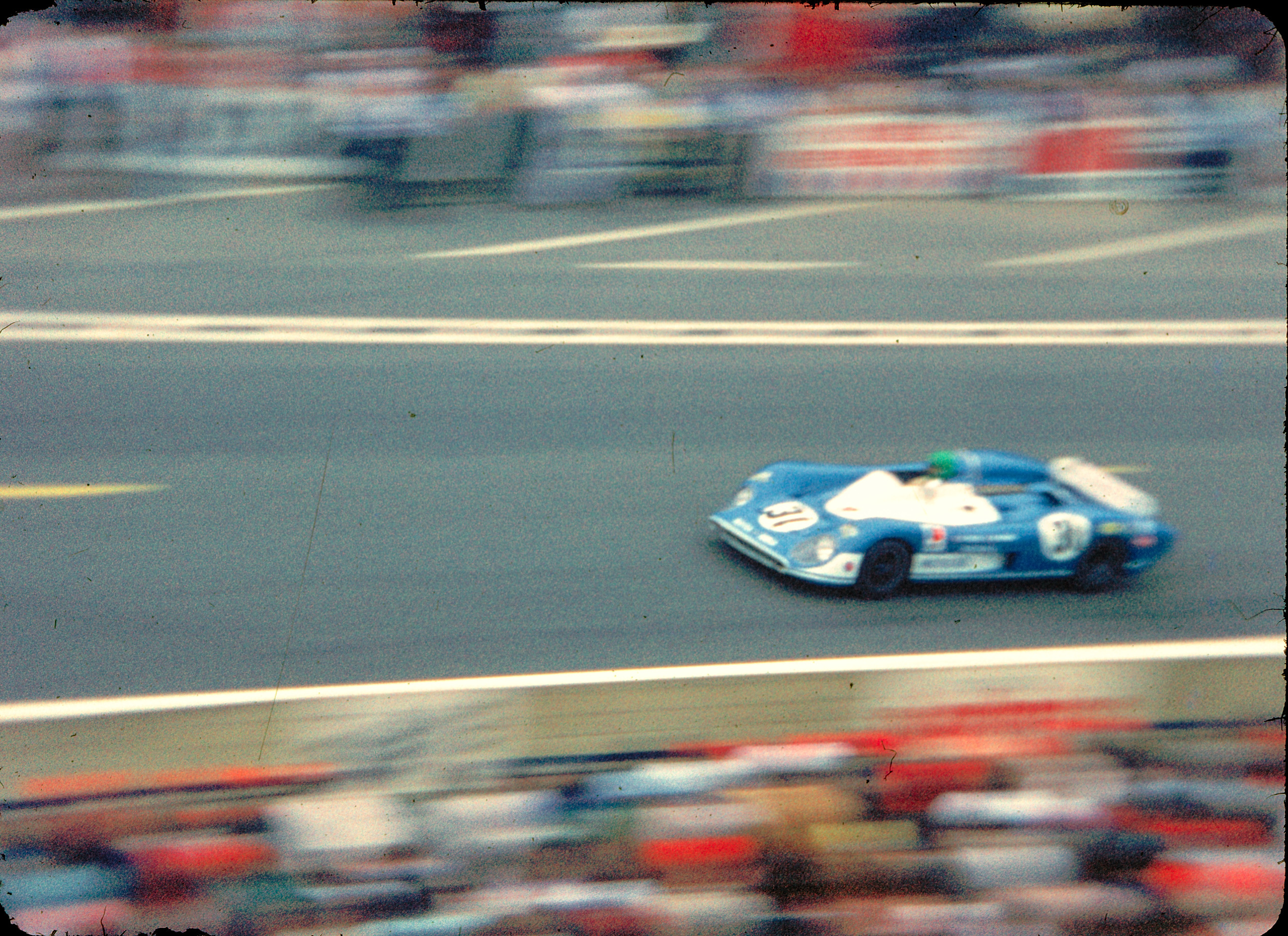
Matra MS660 of Pescarolo/Beltoise during the race

This year the 3-litre Prototypes were not expected to be able to keep up with the power of the big Porsche and Ferraris. Matra had kept away from the championship to concentrate on winning Le Mans. However, development of the new MS660 had been difficult and only one was ready - entrusted to works drivers Henri Pescarolo and Jean-Pierre Beltoise. Despite using an upgraded F1 V12-engine (detuned back to 420 bhp) it proved slower than the two MS650s entered. The long-tail MS650 was driven by Jack Brabham/François Cevert, while Patrick Depailler/Jean-Pierre Jabouille had a short-tail version.

Autodelta, the racing division of Alfa Romeo, returned to Le Mans after a difficult year. They had the latest iteration of the T33. The 3-litre V8 developed 400 bhp and its longtail format gave it a bump of 25 km/h (15 mph). The team brought four cars and had a strong driver line-up enticing Rolf Stommelen (from Porsche) and ‘Nanni’ Galli (from Matra). The others had Piers Courage/Andrea de Adamich, Masten Gregory/Toine Hezemans and Carlo Facetti/Teodoro Zeccoli.

Porsche had their 908/02 spyders that had been very successful the previous year. Martini ran two such cars for Lins/Marko and Spoerry/de Cortanze. A 908 spyder was entered by Solar Productions, which was actor Steve McQueen’s film production company. Driven by Herbert Linge/Jonathan Williams it was fitted with cameras to record race footage for McQueen’s film. NART had bought the 312P works cars from Ferrari and two were entered in the Prototype category. Healey returned with its prototype for a third (and final) time, now as an open-top spyder, and with a bigger Repco 3-litre V8. It would be driven by Roger Enever and Andrew Hedges.

In the smaller-engine categories, there was a new manufacturer present. French racing-driver turned car-maker Guy Ligier had his new JS-1 prototype, with a 1.8-litre Ford-Cosworth FVC engine that put out 240 bhp. Ligier drove it himself alongside Jean-Claude Andruet. As well as a pair of privateer Porsche 910s there were also three Chevron B16s each with a different engine, the most interesting of which was the innovative Mazda Wankel-rotary.

The GT category was once again dominated by privateer Porsche 911s. Many had been uprated with the new 2.2-litre engine. There was also a new Porsche model, the 914/6. The 1991cc flat-6 engine put out 100 bhp and the car was 40kg lighter than the rival 911s. Entered by “Toto” Veuillet's French team Sonauto, it was driven by Guy Chasseuil/Claude Ballot-Léna. Veuillet himself, as a driver, had given Porsche their first ever class-win at Le Mans back in 1951.

Rally-specialist Henri Greder supplied the two Chevrolet Corvettes, the biggest cars in the entry list. Even though General Motors officially had a long-standing ban on racing and supporting privateers, he had a new convertible and had sold his previous car to the Claude Aubriet's Ecurie Léopard. The 7-litre engines now put out 560 bhp and had a top speed of 305 km/h (190 mph).

== Practice ==
As expected the longtail 917s were extremely fast. But it was Pedro Rodriguez who set the initial pace in the Wyer 917K breaking Stommelen's lap record by a second with a 3:21.9. Though not as quick as the longtails, the Ferraris were still faster than the 917Ks and Nino Vaccarella caused quite a stir on the first night of practice when he clocked the fastest time of 3:20.0. Vic Elford then went out on Thursday and put in a 3:19.8, fractionally faster than Vaccarella to take the pole position.

The Wyer Porsches were third and fifth, split by Merzario's Ferrari, then there was a row of Ferraris: the other two works cars of Ickx and Bell, and the two Filipinetti cars of Parkes and Wisell. Slowest of the 917 qualifiers was the third Porsche-Salzburg car of Herrmann/Attwood, doing a 3:32.6 after struggling with brake-issues, to start 15th .

Just ahead of it, in 14th, was the fastest of the Prototypes – the Matra of Brabham/Cevert (3:32.2), ahead of Stommelen's Alfa Romeo in 17th. Yet, after a year of development the Matras were disappointing – coming in three seconds slower than the previous year's 3-litre Porsches. Best of the 2-litres was the new Ligier (4:03.4), and quickest GT was the Léopard Corvette (4:07.2)

The biggest moment of the practice sessions was on Wednesday night when Dieter Spoerry's 908 and Jack Brabham's Matra arrived at the Ford Chicane at the same time. Spoerry's car disintegrated and burst into flames, but the driver got out only lightly injured. However, badly shaken from the experience and an injured leg, he subsequently failed his medical test and the two cars he was cross-entered in (the third Salzburg 917 and the wrecked Martini 908) were withdrawn.

A disconcerting feature of the Wednesday practice was the extreme number of punctures – the JWA team alone had ten, and Ferrari had six. JWA's team manager David Yorke attributed it to the excessive number of bolts and pieces left by the Armco crews the day before. The wide, soft tyres used and hot summer temperatures may also have contributed, but the circuit was swept before the Thursday practice sessions.

== Race ==
=== Start ===
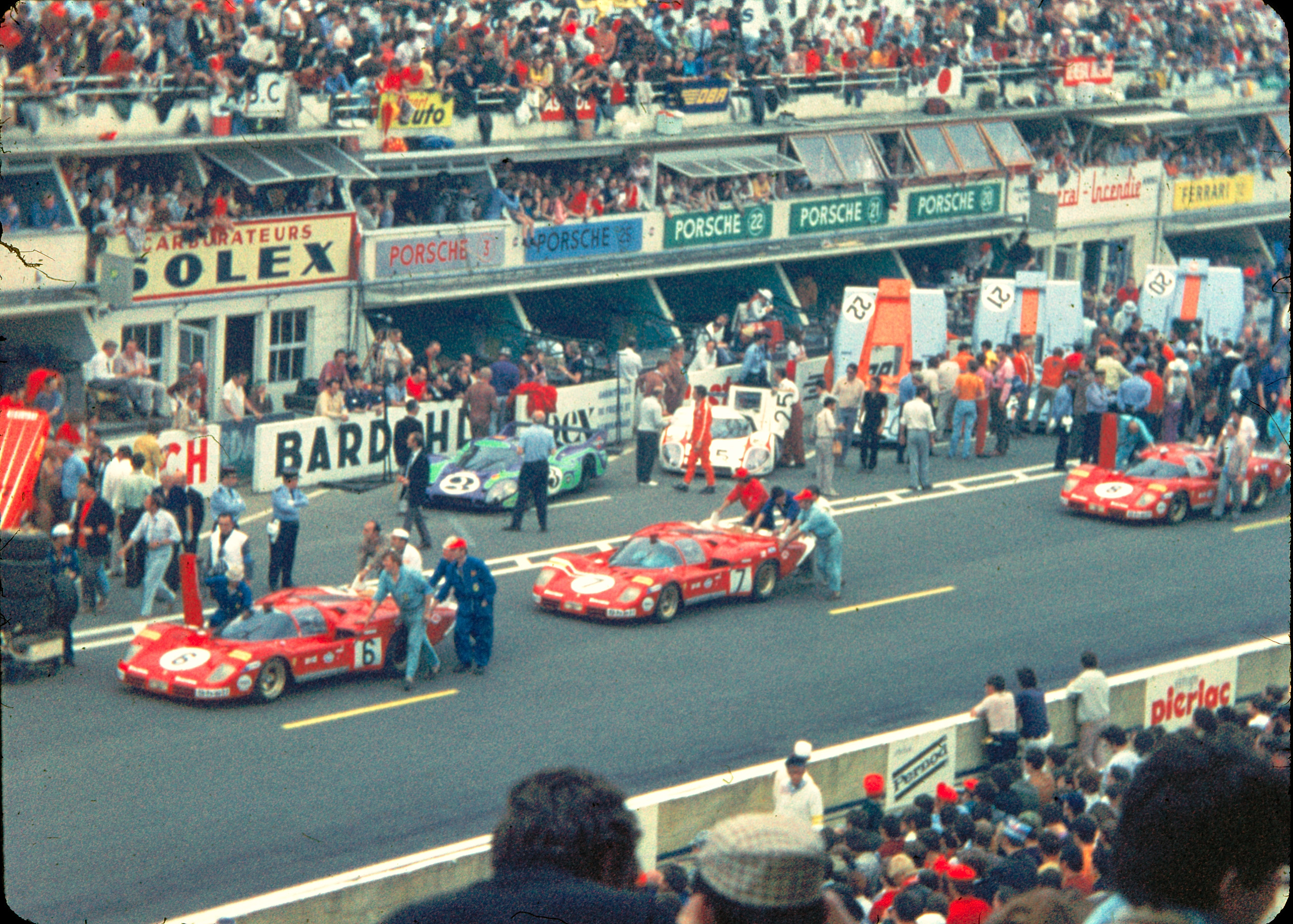
Cars being arranged at the start line before the race. Three Scuderia Ferrari 512 S are visible in the foreground, with the six Porsche 917s of Gulf, Martini and Porsche Salzburg behind them.

After a very hot week, Friday afternoon brought thunderstorms and then rain overnight. Although further storms were predicted by the time of the race-start the weather was overcast but dry. Most cars that were lined up with wet-tyres were quickly changed back to slicks for the start.

Following the bad (including one fatal) accidents soon after the start of the previous two years, with drivers not having fastened their seatbelts to save time, the ACO finally abolished the traditional “Le Mans start”. This year the cars were lined up in echelon (but a shallower angle to allow easier getaway) with the drivers fully belted and strapped in for the start. From 1971 onwards, races would begin with rolling starts. Reverting this year back to its normal start time of 4pm, the guest starter this year was Dr Ferry Porsche, marking Porsche's 20th year of participation. Everyone got away smoothly and at the end of the first lap Elford led Siffert and Rodriguez, then the Ferraris of Merzario and Vaccarella. They started lapping tail-enders after only three laps.

But after only seven laps Vaccarella's Ferrari was in the pits with its crankshaft broken, and was out. It was followed soon after by the Gregory/Hezemans Alfa, with its engine wrecked, and then the Alfa was followed to retirement on the 23rd lap, after the first pitstops, by the JWA 917K of Pedro Rodríguez, who stopped at Arnage with a blown engine from cooling fan failure. After Elford had set a new lap record, he and Siffert established a clear margin at the front of the field and settled into a routine of alternating the lead.

At 5.30pm the rain finally arrived. Soon after, Reine Wisell, barely able to see through his Ferrari's oil-streaked windscreen had slowed on the side of the road approaching the very fast and tricky Maison Blanche (English: White House) corner. Suddenly four duelling Ferraris arrived at speed: Posey in the NART car raced past. Unsighted, Regazzoni smashed into Wisell followed by the Parkes car that caught fire. Le Mans debutante Derek Bell had managed to swerve past Wisell but the excessive gearbox change-downs over-revved his engine and the car broke half a lap later on the Mulsanne Straight. Ferrari had four of its leading contenders taken out in one hit, but the only injury was to Parkes with minor burns to his leg.

A few laps later, the rain triggered another accident when Carlo Facetti spun his Alfa at Dunlop Curve, hitting the barriers. He got out and was running back to the pits to get two replacement wheels when Mike Hailwood, on his last lap on slicks in the third Wyer Porsche, crashed into the parked Alfa Romeo, leaving just three of the top 10 qualifiers running.

=== Night ===
The rain became torrential around 8pm as dusk fell, sending many cars skating. Helmut Kelleners hit the barriers at the Esses, avoiding a spinning car. Gijs van Lennep had qualified the AAW Racing Team’s 917 11th and with the attrition they had moved up to 3rd by 10pm when co-entrant and driver David Piper spun it in the Esses, nudging the barrier and damaging the front suspension. Due to a faulty batch of third-party supplied parts, all three Matras retired with leaking piston rings within ten laps of each other, when Brabham and Cevert had been leading the prototypes, and running as high as 7th. The French challenge had dissolved within four hours.

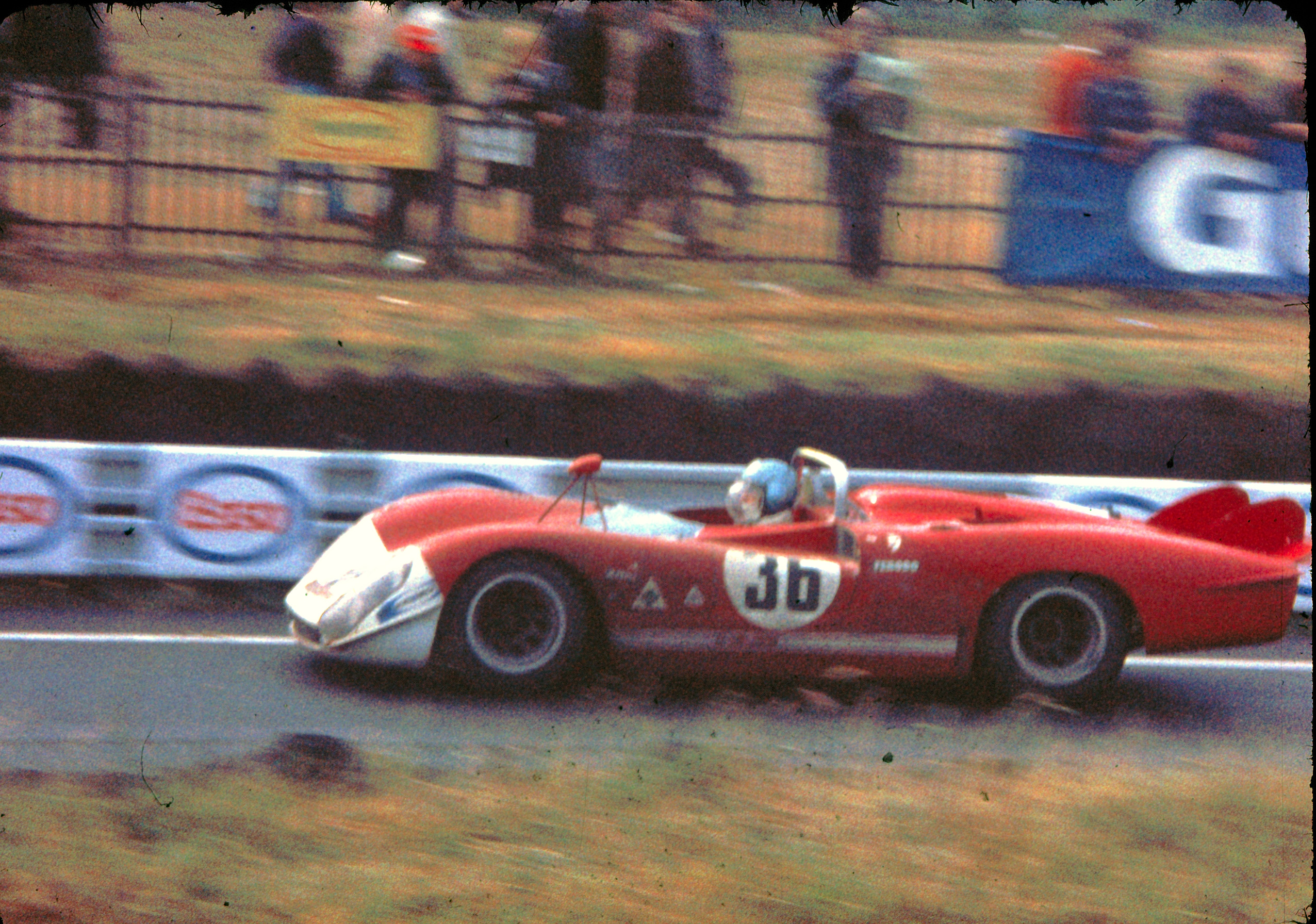
Alfa Romeo T33 of de Adamich/Courage during the race. It retired due to engine problems.

It was now that the skill of Jacky Ickx came to the fore. While others proceeded with caution he made up time, bringing the Ferrari up to third despite his body's discomfort. When the Elford/Ahrens Porsche had to pit with wayward handling (that was traced to a slow puncture, and dropping them to 5th) he moved up to second at midnight. Soon afterward, van Lennep was motoring down the Mulsanne Straight in the AAW 917 at close to 290 km/h when a tyre blew out, possibly due to the earlier damage. His skill kept it on the ground and off the wall but the chassis damage was too severe to continue. The de Adamich/Courage Alfa Romeo was leading the Prototypes, in 6th, until a long pit stop before midnight delayed it. On its next shift Courage ran out of fuel approaching the pits and had to get out and push it. When it arrived it had five people pushing and needed a jump-start to resume – all illegal in the regulations, but the officials either could not or did not see it.

At 1.45am Ickx's epic charge came to a tragic end. He was trying to unlap himself from Siffert when the Ferrari's rear brakes failed approaching the Ford chicane. He crashed into a sodden sandbank and was launched over it, bursting into flame and killing track marshal Jacques Argoud and injuring another. Ickx himself was unharmed. With all 4 works Ferraris out, the Ferrari challenge to Porsche was effectively over.

The Siffert/Redman JWAE Porsche continued to run strongly, building up a huge 10-lap lead by 2am. That was until Siffert accidentally missed a gear-change lapping back-markers and broke the engine. So at half-time, the lead had passed to the Porsche-Salzburg's third car of Herrmann/Attwood (176 laps) that had been lapping consistently and moving up steadily from its lowly grid position of 15th. Martini's psychedelic longtail was second, three laps back. But soon after water got into electrics and it lost time, dropping two places. Elford/Ahrens had pushed back up to 3rd (172 laps) and the Lins/Marko 908 in 4th (171 laps) had a handy 5-lap lead in the Group 6 category over Stommelen's Alfa Romeo in 5th.

=== Morning ===
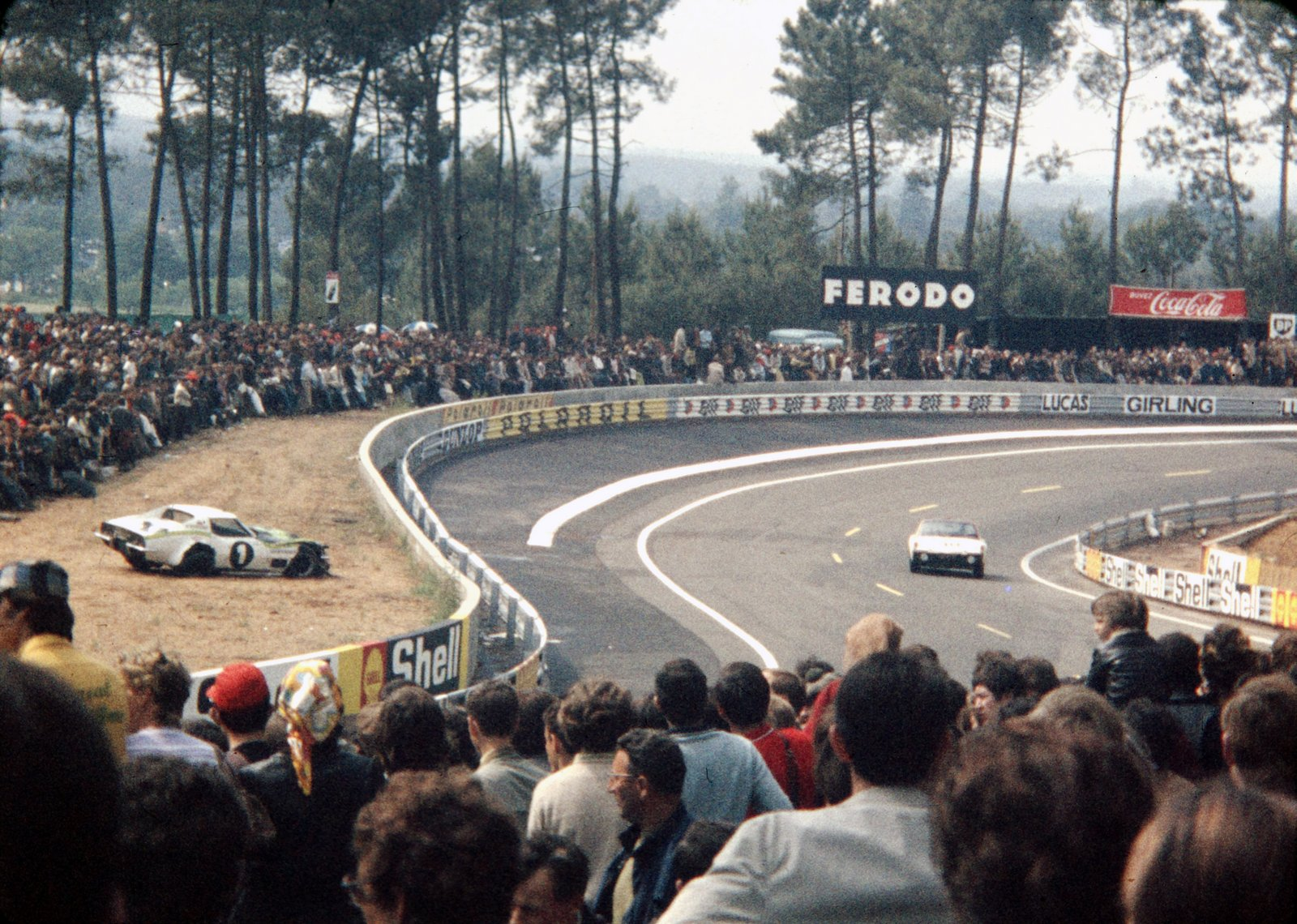
The Porsche 914/6 of Ballot-Léna/Chasseuil passes the wrecked Ecurie Léopard Corvette at the Esses

At dawn the weather turned from heavy rain to a storm. At 6am, after 16 hours, Porsches still held the top four places: Herrmann/Attwood leading with the Elford/Ahrens ‘longtail’ back up to second, the Lins/Marko 908 in third (and first prototype) and the Larrousse/Kauhsen Martini-‘longtail’ in fourth. Fifth was the Stommelen/Galli Alfa Romeo, ahead of the Ferraris of NART (Posey/Bucknum) and Ecurie Francorchamps (Fierlandt/Walker) and the NART 312P (the Alfa's rival in the Prototype category). The French Porsche 914 was leading the GT category, in 10th, in a terrific tussle with Greder's Corvette and the Ecurie Luxembourg 911. Half the field were now retirements.

At 8am the Stommelen/Galli Alfa, just overtaken by the NART Ferrari, was unable to get away from its pitstop without a push-start, for which it was subsequently disqualified within the hour. Then at 8.30am, after 18 hours, Elford's 917 was stopped by engine problems. The rain finally eased off and the track was virtually dry by 9.30am. That allowed Larrousse/Kauhsen to pick up their pace and they moved up to second place by midday and set about trying to catch the leaders. The field was widely spread: Herrmann/Attwood had a 5-lap lead (282 laps) over the two Martini Porsches, a comfortable 15 laps ahead of the Posey/Bucknum Ferrari and a further 12-laps to the Belgian Ferrari (250) with the NART 312P of Adamowicz/Parsons in 6th (237 laps).

=== Finish and post-race ===
Going into the last hours, most of the leading positions remained unchanged. The two remaining Chevrons had been running at the back of the field for much of the latter half of the race after both needing engine rebuilds. After the BMW engine failed one, the faster Cosworth-engined car carried on as the only survivor in the 2-litre Prototype class. However it was stopped with only 90 minutes to run. The Healey prototype, which had been battling gearbox issues for most of the race, requiring a rebuild. With less than a quarter-hour, and two laps, to go and still in 14th, Roger Enever headed out on a final lap, but for the sake of a 10-cent part, the engine stopped on the Mulsanne Straight and the car would not restart. Outlasting the Matras and Alfas, the NART 312P had moved up to 6th but with 3 hours to go it developed a serious misfire. It took a long time to replace the sparkplugs and the team knew they would not reach their target distance. When the electrics finally packed up on the final lap approaching Maison Blanche, spectators jumped the fence and helped push Adamowicz to the line, the 10th car home.

Hans Herrmann and Richard Attwood in their red and white No. 23 Porsche Salzburg 917K won by five laps. In a great debut for the new Martini Racing team, Gérard Larrousse and Willi Kauhsen finished second in the psychedelic 917 longtail and the 908/02 of Rudi Lins and Helmut Marko was third. Despite sounding very rough and errant steering, the Posey/Bucknum NART Ferrari kept going and was rewarded with a fourth place. The Belgian Ferrari was fifth, meeting its required distance by a single lap. Although the French Corvette was the first GT home, it hadn’t achieved its required minimum distance, so the GT prize went to the 914/6 of Ballot-Léna/Chasseuil finishing a lap behind. They had a remarkable run without having to change brakes or even tyres. Three laps further back was the Ecurie Luxembourg 911.

In a typically attrition-filled Le Mans 24 Hours, it was a dominant victory by Porsche: of the sixteen cars running at the end, twelve were Porsches, and the top 3 were all Porsche prototypes. None of the factory Ferraris, Alfas or Matras finished the race, and only 2 privateer Ferraris finished. However, many of the Porsche 911s were slowed by the atrocious weather and covered insufficient distance to be classified. As well as finishing 1-2-3, Porsche had won all four classes that had finishers. The third-placed 908 claimed the Index of Performance while the Martini 917 won the Index of Thermal Efficiency.

Hans Herrmann was a race-veteran at age 42 in his 13th Le Mans and had driven for Mercedes and Porsche in F1 and survived the dangerous Mille Miglia and Carrera Panamericana races of the 1950s. He had promised his wife to quit racing if he should finally win Le Mans, a success which he had missed narrowly by barely 120 metres in 1969. So he retired with immediate effect, much to the surprise of his Porsche Salzburg team. For someone whose career with Porsche extended back to 1953, with Porsche's first mid-engine car, the 550, it was appropriate he was there when the marque finally won its coveted Le Mans outright victory at its 20th attempt.

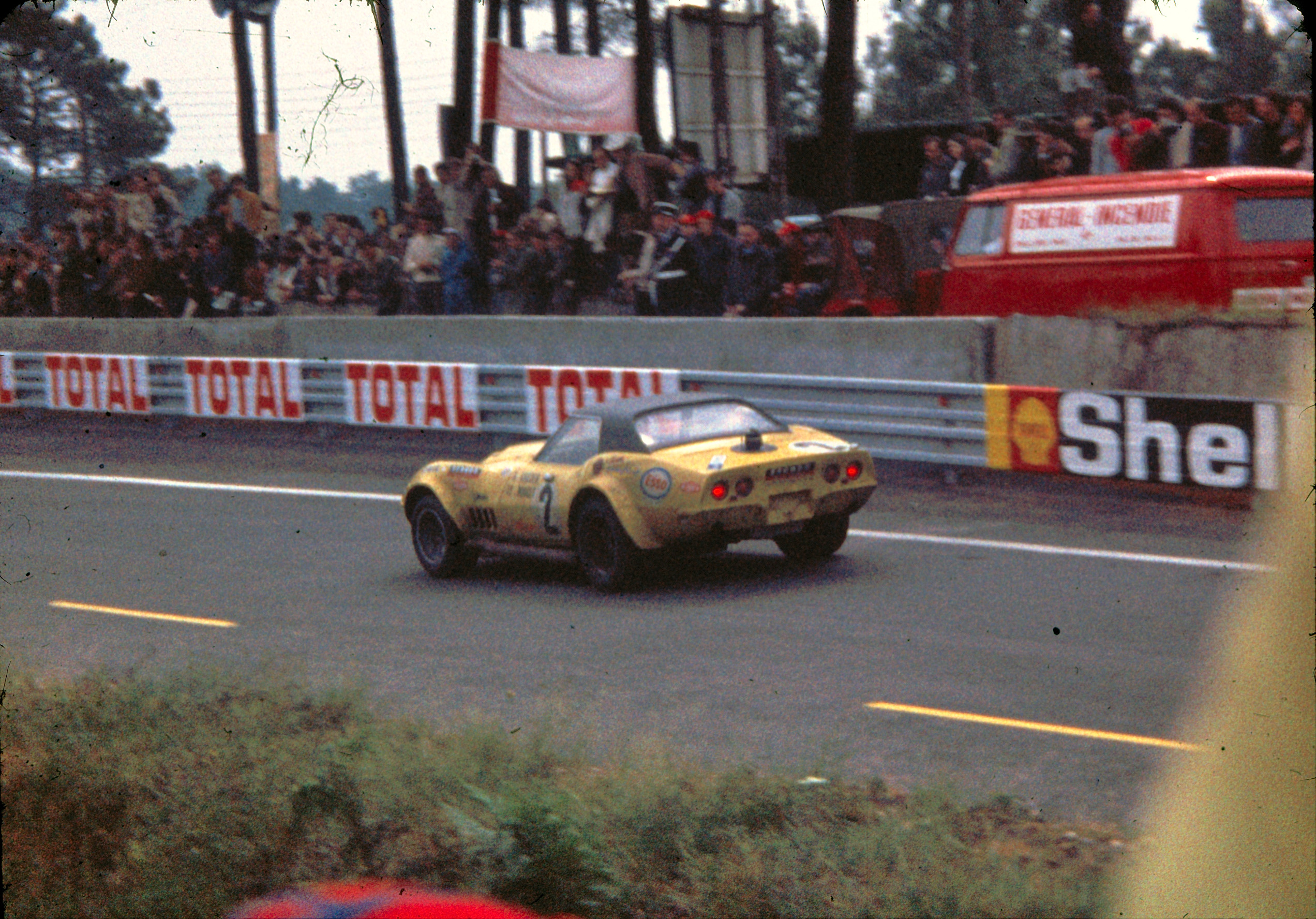
GT-class Chevrolet Corvette of Greder/Rouget during the race

Later in the year, the FIA acknowledged the weather had severely compromised the GT Corvette with its target distance skewed because of its 7-litre engine compared to the Porsches, and awarded it first-place points for the GT Cup. The ACO did not change its results but did send Greder a cheque equivalent to the GT-winners prize-money. The ACO also released some commercial information: 300 000 spectators, about half of them paying the entry fee. Around 10% were foreigners supervised by an additional 40000 officials, police, emergency staff, journalists and trades people. Three hundred commercial sites (bars, cafés, fairground) raised 6.5 million francs with another 7 million from advertising that barely covered the cost to run the race. The circuit used electricity equivalent to a city of 80000, and over 2.5 million phonecalls were made.

However it was another terrible year for driver deaths and injuries. Just a fortnight before the race, former Le Mans winner Bruce McLaren had been killed testing his new car. Piers Courage, driving the Alfa Romeo in this race, died during the F1 Dutch GP. To underline the safety problem, Jochen Rindt, 1965 Le Mans winner, was killed at Monza becoming the only posthumous F1 World Champion.

Thirty years later, the second-placed Martini Porsche and its psychedelic paint scheme was voted by a public poll as the “Le Mans Car of the Century”.

== The Steve McQueen movie Le Mans ==
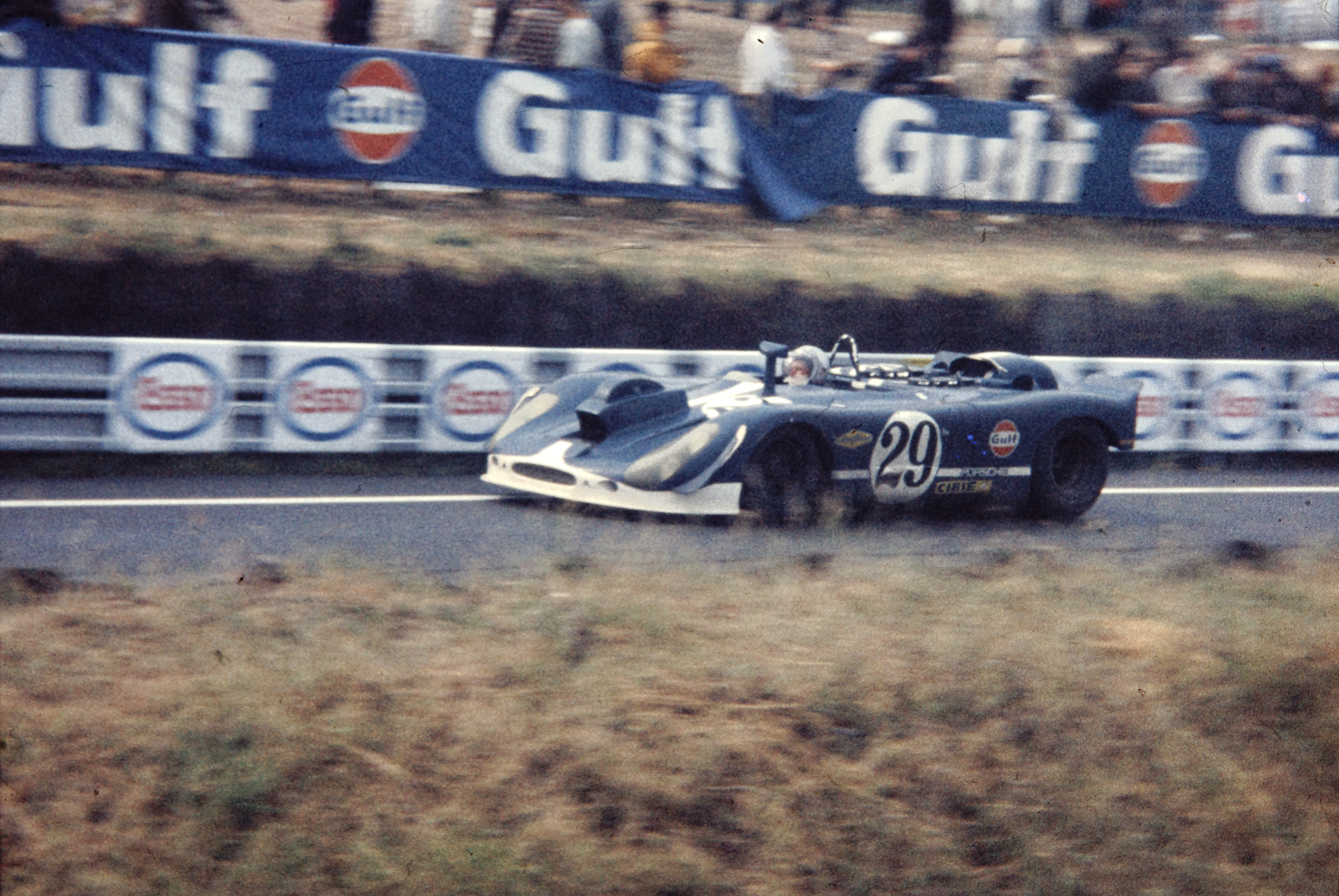
The Solar Productions Porsche 908-022 during the race. Bulky camera housings are visible at front and rear.

A notable presence at this year's race was Solar Productions, Steve McQueen’s film company, at La Sarthe to make a feature film revolving around the race directed by John Sturges. McQueen, at that time one of Hollywood’s most bankable action stars, had purchased a Porsche 908 spyder to race. With Peter Revson as co-driver, he had come second at the Sebring 12 Hours earlier in the year only 20 seconds behind the Ferrari winner. He was pencilled in to share a JWAE Porsche 917 with current F1 World Champion Jackie Stewart but his life insurance company refused to cover him for Le Mans. JWAE did however supply two of the cars and a number of mechanics for the film. The 908 was entered for the race and equipped with cameras to record on-track race footage.

Happy that the script had a Gulf-Porsche victory, Porsche released their works driver Herbert Linge to drive the camera-car, alongside Jonathan Williams. For the same reason, Enzo Ferrari declined to provide any cars for the film, and the Ferraris depicted in the film were supplied by the Jacques Swaters’ Ecurie Francorchamps.

However, after filming the first two laps and pitting for a camera change, the car was delayed by a problematic starter motor. The heavy rain also compromised the chances to get daylight racing footage. Despite that, the car collected more than 250,000 feet of film, although the frequent stops meant the car could not cover enough distance to be classified.

As well as using the car, Solar did filming at the April test weekend beforehand and had six cameras positioned around the circuit. Although the ACO was adamant that cameramen would not be positioned in front of the safety barriers by the track. Solar also hired the track for 12 weeks after the race and had 26 Sports and Prototypes on hand. Older Lolas were rebodied and used for the crash sequences. A number of the race's drivers were also on hand, including Attwood, Bell, Elford, Galli, Jabouille, Parkes, Redman, Siffert, Spoerry and Stommelen. In August, Derek Bell suffered minor burns when his Ferrari suddenly caught fire. Later, David Piper had a far more serious accident when his Porsche blew a tyre at speed. The car smashed into the barriers on both sides of the track and broke in two. Although Piper survived, he had to have his lower right leg amputated.

== Official results ==
=== Finishers ===
Results taken from Quentin Spurring's book, officially licensed by the ACO Class winners are in bold text.

Pos	Class	No.	Team	Drivers	Chassis	Engine	Tyre	Laps
1	**S** **5.0**	**23**	**(Austria) Porsche Konstruktionen -** **Salzburg**	**(Germany) Hans Herrmann** **(United Kingdom) Richard Attwood**	Porsche 917K	Porsche 4.5L F12	G	343
2	S 5.0	3	(Germany) Martini International; Racing Team	(France) Gérard Larrousse (Germany) Willi Kauhsen	Porsche 917L	Porsche 4.5L F12	G	338
3	**P** **3.0**	**27**	**(Germany) Martini International**; **Racing Team**	**(Austria) Helmut Marko** **(Austria) Rudi Lins**	Porsche 908/02 LH	Porsche 3.0L F8	D	335
4	S 5.0	11	(United States) North American Racing Team	(United States) Ronnie Bucknum (United States) Sam Posey	Ferrari 512S	Ferrari 5.0L V12	G	313
5	S 5.0	12	(Belgium) Ecurie Francorchamps	(Belgium) Baron Hughes de Fierlandt (United Kingdom) Alistair Walker	Ferrari 512S	Ferrari 5.0L V12	F	305
N/C *	GT +5.0	2	(France) Greder Racing (private entrant)	(France) Henri Greder (France) Jean-Pierre Rouget	Chevrolet Corvette C3	Chevrolet 7.0L V8	G	286
6	**GT**; **2.0**	**40**	**(France) Établissements Sonauto**	**(France) Claude Ballot-Léna** **(France) Guy Chasseuil**	Porsche 914/6 GT	Porsche 1991cc F6	D	285
N/C *	P 3.0	29	(United States) Solar Productions	(Germany) Herbert Linge (United Kingdom) Jonathan Williams	Porsche 908/2 (Camera Car)	Porsche 3.0L F8	G	282
7	**GT**; **2.5**	**47**	**Écurie Luxembourg**	**(Luxembourg) Nicolas Koob** **(Germany) Erwin Kremer**	Porsche 911S	Porsche 2253cc F6	D	282
N/C *	P 3.0	57 (reserve)	(United States) North American Racing Team	(United States) Tony Adamowicz (United States) Chuck Parsons	Ferrari 312P Coupé	Ferrari 3.0L V12	G	281
N/C *	GT; 2.5	62 (reserve)	(France) R. Mazzia (private entrant)	(France) René Mazzia (France) Pierre Mauroy	Porsche 911S	Porsche 2195cc F6		275
N/C *	GT; 2.0	42	(Switzerland) Wicky Racing Team	(France) Sylvain Garant (France) Guy Verrier	Porsche 911T	Porsche 1991cc F6		271
N/C *	GT; 2.0	67 (reserve)	(France) J. Dechaumel (private entrant)	(France) Jacques Dechaumel (France) Jean-Claude Parot	Porsche 911S	Porsche 1991cc F6		271
N/C *	GT; 2.5	45	(France) C. Laurent (private entrant)	(France) Claude Laurent (France) Jacques Marché	Porsche 911S	Porsche 2195cc F6		262
N/C *	GT; 2.0	64 (reserve)	(Switzerland) C. Haldi (private entrant)	(France) Jean Sage (Switzerland) Pierre Greub	Porsche 911S	Porsche 1991cc F6		254
N/C *	GT; 2.0	66 (reserve)	(France) R. Touroul (private entrant)	(France) Jean-Claude Lagniez (France) Claude Swietlik	Porsche 911S	Porsche 1991cc F6	D	231

- 'Note *: Not Classified because insufficient distance covered.

=== Did Not Finish ===
Pos	Class	No	Team	Drivers	Chassis	Engine	Tyre	Laps	Reason
DNF	P 3.0	34	(United Kingdom) Donald Healey Motor Company	(United Kingdom) Roger Enever (United Kingdom) Andrew Hedges	Healey SR XR37	Repco 740 3.0L V8	D	264	Electrics (24hr)
DNF	S 5.0	25	(Austria) Porsche Konstruktionen - Salzburg	(United Kingdom) Vic Elford (Germany) Kurt Ahrens Jr.	Porsche 917L	Porsche 4.9L F12	G	225	Engine (18hr)
DNF	P 3.0	36	(Italy) Autodelta SpA	(United Kingdom) Piers Courage (Italy) Andrea de Adamich	Alfa Romeo T33/3	Alfa Romeo 3.0L V8	F	222	Engine (20hr)
DSQ	P 3.0	35	(Italy) Autodelta SpA	(Germany) Rolf Stommelen (Italy) Nanni Galli	Alfa Romeo T33/3	Alfa Romeo 3.0L V8	F	220	Outside Assistance (11hr)
DNF	P 2.0	49	(United Kingdom) Chevron Racing Team	(United Kingdom) Ian Skailes (United Kingdom) John Hine	Chevron B16	Ford Cosworth FVC 1771cc S4	D	213	Engine (24hr)
DNF	P 2.0	44	(United Kingdom) Chevron Racing Team	(United Kingdom) Clive Baker (United Kingdom) Digby Martland	Chevron B16	BMW 1992cc S4	D	187	Engine (20hr)
DNF	P 2.5	61 (reserve)	(Switzerland) Wicky Racing Team	(Switzerland) André Wicky (France) Jean-Pierre Hanrioud	Porsche 907	Porsche 2195cc F6		161	Throttle (17hr)
DNF	S 5.0	20	(United Kingdom) JW Automotive Engineering	(Switzerland) Jo Siffert (United Kingdom) Brian Redman	Porsche 917K	Porsche 4.9L F12	F	156	Engine (12hr)
DNF	S 5.0	5	(Italy) SpA Ferrari SEFAC	(Belgium) Jacky Ickx (Switzerland) Peter Schetty	Ferrari 512S	Ferrari 5.0L V12	F	142	Accident (11hr)
DNF	GT; 2.5	63 (reserve)	(Switzerland) Rey Racing (private entrant)	(Switzerland) Jacques Rey (Switzerland) Bernard Chenevière	Porsche 911S	Porsche 2247cc F6	D	132	Accident (13hr)
DNF	S 5.0	9	(Spain) Escuderia Montjuich	(Spain) José Juncadella (Spain) Juan Fernandez	Ferrari 512S Spyder	Ferrari 5.0L V12	F	130	Accident (12hr)
DNF	P 2.0	60 (reserve)	(France) G. Verrier (private entrant)	(France) Daniel Rouveyran (Switzerland) Willy Meier	Porsche 910	Porsche 1991cc F6		128	Brakes (15hr)
DNF	GT; 2.5	65 (reserve)	(Switzerland) Hart Ski Racing (Switzerland) Claude Haldi	(Switzerland) Claude Haldi (Switzerland) Arthur Blank	Porsche 911S	Porsche 2247cc F6	D	124	Transmission (19hr)
DNF	S 2.0	46	(France) C. Poirot (private entrant)	(France) Christian Poirot (Germany) Ernst Kraus	Porsche 910	Porsche 1991cc F6	D	120	Engine (14hr)
DNF	S 5.0	18	(United Kingdom) David Piper Autorace (Finland) AAW Racing Team	(United Kingdom) David Piper (Netherlands) Gijs van Lennep	Porsche 917K	Porsche 4.5L F12	G	112	Accident (11hr)
DNF	S 5.0	16	(Switzerland) Scuderia Filipinetti (Italy) Scuderia Picchio Rosso	(Italy) Corrado Manfredini (Italy) Gianpiero Moretti	Ferrari 512S	Ferrari 5.0L V12	G	111	Transmission (13hr)
DNF	S 5.0	4	(Belgium) Racing Team VDS	(Belgium) Teddy Pilette (Belgium) Gustave ‘Taf’ Gosselin	Lola T70 Mk. IIIB	Chevrolet 4.9L V8	F	109	Transmission (10hr)
DNF	GT; 2.5	43	(Belgium) J.-P. Gaban (private entrant)	(Belgium) Jean-Pierre Gaban (Belgium) Willy Braillard	Porsche 911S	Porsche 2195cc F6	D	109	Transmission (11hr)
DNF	P 3.0	31	(France) Equipe Matra Elf	(France) Jean-Pierre Beltoise (France) Henri Pescarolo	Matra-Simca MS660	Matra 3.0L V12	G	79	Engine (7hr)
DNF	P 3.0	32	(France) Equipe Matra Elf	(Australia) Jack Brabham (France) François Cevert	Matra-Simca MS650	Matra 3.0L V12	G	76	Engine (7hr)
DNF	P 3.0	30	(France) Equipe Matra Elf	(France) Patrick Depailler (France) Jean-Pierre Jabouille	Matra-Simca MS650	Matra 3.0L V12	G	70	Engine (7hr)
DNF	GT; 2.5	59 (reserve)	(France) J. Égreteaud (private entrant)	(France) Jean Égreteaud (France) Jean Mésange	Porsche 911S	Porsche 2247cc F6	D	70	Engine (8hr)
DNF	P 2.0	50	(France) Automobiles Ligier	(France) Guy Ligier (France) Jean-Claude Andruet	Ligier JS1	Ford Cosworth FVC 1786cc S4	D	65	Electrics (8hr)
DNF	S 5.0	10	(United States) North American Racing Team (Germany) Gelo Racing Team	(Germany) Georg Loos (Germany) Helmut Kelleners	Ferrari 512S	Ferrari 5.0L V12	G	54	Accident (7hr)
DNF	S 5.0	22	(United Kingdom) JW Automotive Engineering	(United Kingdom) David Hobbs (United Kingdom) Mike Hailwood	Porsche 917K	Porsche 4.5L F12	F	49	Accident (5hr)
DNF	P 3.0	38	(Italy) Autodelta SpA	(Italy) Teodoro Zeccoli (Italy) Carlo Facetti	Alfa Romeo T33/3	Alfa Romeo 3.0L V8	F	43	Accident (5hr)
DNF	S 5.0	7	(Italy) SpA Ferrari SEFAC	(United Kingdom) Derek Bell (Sweden) Ronnie Peterson	Ferrari 512S	Ferrari 5.0L V12	F	39	Accident (4hr)
DNF	S 5.0	8	(Italy) SpA Ferrari SEFAC	(Italy) Arturo Merzario (Switzerland) Clay Regazzoni	Ferrari 512S	Ferrari 5.0L V12	F	38	Accident (4hr)
DNF	GT +5.0	1	(France) Écurie Léopard	(France) Jean-Claude Aubriet (France) Joseph Bourdon	Chevrolet Corvette C3	Chevrolet 7.0L V8	G	37	Accident (5hr)
DNF	S 5.0	15	(Switzerland) Scuderia Filipinetti	(United Kingdom) Mike Parkes (Switzerland) Herbert Müller	Ferrari 512S	Ferrari 5.0L V12	G	37	Accident (4hr)
DNF	S 5.0	14	(Switzerland) Scuderia Filipinetti	(Sweden) Jo Bonnier (Sweden) Reine Wisell	Ferrari 512S	Ferrari 5.0L V12	G	36	Accident (4hr)
DNF	S 5.0	21	(United Kingdom) JW Automotive Engineering	(Mexico) Pedro Rodriguez (Finland) Leo Kinnunen	Porsche 917K	Porsche 4.9L F12	F	22	Engine (4hr)
DNF	P 2.0	48	(Belgium) Levi's International Racing Team	(Belgium) Julian Vernaeve (Belgium) Yves Deprez	Chevron B16	Mazda 10A Twin Rotor (1964cc equivalent)	D	19	Engine (4hr)
DNF	S 5.0	6	(Italy) SpA Ferrari SEFAC	(Italy) Nino Vaccarella (Italy) Ignazio Giunti	Ferrari 512S	Ferrari 5.0L V12	F	7	Engine (1hr)
DNF	P 3.0	37	(Italy) Autodelta SpA	(Netherlands) Toine Hezemans (United States) Masten Gregory	Alfa Romeo T33/3	Alfa Romeo 3.0L V8	F	5	Engine (2hr)

=== Did Not Start ===
Pos	Class	No	Team	Drivers	Chassis	Engine	Reason
DNS	S 5.0	17	(United Kingdom) Grand Bahamas Racing Team	(The Bahamas) Robin Ormes (United Kingdom) David Prophet	Lola T70 Mk. IIIB	Chevrolet 4.9L V8	Did not qualify
DNS	P 3.0	28	(Germany) Martini International; Racing Team	(France) André de Cortanze (Switzerland) Dieter Spoerry (Austria) Rudi Lins	Porsche 908/2	Porsche 3.0L F8	Practice accident
DNS	P 3.0	39	(United States) North American Racing Team	(United States) Tony Adamowicz (United States) Sam Posey	Ferrari 312P Coupé	Ferrari 3.0L V12	Spare car
DNS	GT; 2.5	41	(Switzerland) Wicky Racing Team	(France) Sylvain Garant (France) Jean Mésange	Porsche 911S	Porsche 2195cc F6	Withdrawn
DNQ	S 2.0	68	(United Kingdom) R. Johnson (private entrant)	(United Kingdom) Roy Johnson (United States) Erwin Barnes	Chevron B8	BMW 1991cc S4	Did not qualify
DNA	S 5.0	24	(Austria) Porsche Konstruktionen - Salzburg	(Switzerland) Rico Steinemann (Switzerland) Dieter Spoerry	Porsche 917K	Porsche 4.5L F12	Withdrawn
DNA	S 5.0	26	(United Kingdom) JW Automotive Engineering	(United Kingdom) Jackie Stewart (United States) Steve McQueen	Porsche 917K	Porsche 4.5L F12	Withdrawn
DNA	P 2.5	54	(France) G. Verrier (private entrant)	(France) Guy Verrier (France) Frederic Mural	Porsche 907	Porsche 2.2L F6	Reserve

=== Class Winners ===
Class	Prototype Winners		Class	Sports Winners		Class	GT Winners	
Prototype 3000	#27 Porsche 908/2 LH	Marko / Lins	Sports 5000	#23 Porsche 917K	Herrmann / Attwood	Grand Touring >2500	no finishers	
Prototype 2500	no finishers		Sports 2500	no entrants		Grand Touring 2500	#47 Porsche 911 S	Koob / Kremer *
Prototype 2000	no finishers		Sports 2000	no finishers		Grand Touring 2000	#40 Porsche 914/6 GT	Ballot-Léna / Chasseuil

- Note: setting a new class distance record.

=== Index of Thermal Efficiency ===
Pos	Class	No	Team	Drivers	Chassis	Score
1	S 5.0	3	(Germany) Martini International; Racing Team	(France) Gérard Larrousse (Germany) Willi Kauhsen	Porsche 917L	0.89
2	GT; 2.0	40	(France) Établissements Sonauto	(France) Claude Ballot-Léna (France) Guy Chasseuil	Porsche 914/6 GT	0.80
3	P 3.0	27	(Germany) Martini International; Racing Team	(Austria) Helmut Marko (Austria) Rudi Lins	Porsche 908/2LH	0.79
4	S 5.0	23	(Austria) Porsche Konstruktionen - Salzburg	(Germany) Hans Herrmann (United Kingdom) Richard Attwood	Porsche 917K	0.77
5	GT; 2.5	47	Écurie Luxembourg	(Luxembourg) Nicolas Koob (Germany) Erwin Kremer	Porsche 911S	0.75

=== Index of Performance ===
Taken from Moity's book.

Pos	Class	No	Team	Drivers	Chassis	Score
1	P 3.0	27	(Germany) Martini International; Racing Team	(Austria) Helmut Marko (Austria) Rudi Lins	Porsche 908/2LH	1.151
2	S 5.0	23	(Austria) Porsche Konstruktionen - Salzburg	(Germany) Hans Herrmann (United Kingdom) Richard Attwood	Porsche 917K	1.132
3	S 5.0	3	(Germany) Martini International; Racing Team	(France) Gérard Larrousse (Germany) Willi Kauhsen	Porsche 917L	1.116
4	GT; 2.0	40	(France) Établissements Sonauto	(France) Claude Ballot-Léna (France) Guy Chasseuil	Porsche 914/6 GT	1.041
5	S 5.0	11	(United States) North American Racing Team	(United States) Ronnie Bucknum (United States) Sam Posey	Ferrari 512S	1.026
6	GT; 2.5	47	Écurie Luxembourg	(Luxembourg) Nicolas Koob (Germany) Erwin Kremer	Porsche 911S	1.008
7	S 5.0	12	(Belgium) Ecurie Francorchamps	(Belgium) Baron Hughes de Fierlandt (United Kingdom) Alistair Walker	Ferrari 512S	1.000

- Note: A score of 1.00 means meeting the minimum distance for the car, and a higher score is exceeding the nominal target distance.

=== Statistics ===
Taken from Quentin Spurring's book, officially licensed by the ACO

- Fastest Lap in practice – V. Elford, #25 Porsche 917L – 3:19.8secs; 242.69 km/h (150.80 mph)
- Fastest Lap – V. Elford, #25 Porsche 917L – 3:21.0secs; 241.24 km/h (149.90 mph)
- Winning Distance – 4,607.59 km (2,863.02 mi)
- Winner's Average Speed – 192.00 km/h (119.30 mph)
- Attendance –300 000

=== International Championship for Makes Standings ===
As calculated after Le Mans, Round 8 of 10

Pos	Manufacturer	Points
1	(West Germany) Porsche	63 (69)*
2	(Italy) Ferrari	36 (38)*
3	(Italy) Alfa Romeo	4
4	(France) Matra	4
5	(United States) Chevrolet	2

- Note: Only the best 7 of 10 results counted to the final Championship points. The full total earned to date is given in brackets

Citations

World Sportscar Championship
Previous race: 1000km of Nürburgring	1970 season	Next race: Watkins Glen 6 Hours
