= Ferrari 312 P =

Competition sports car

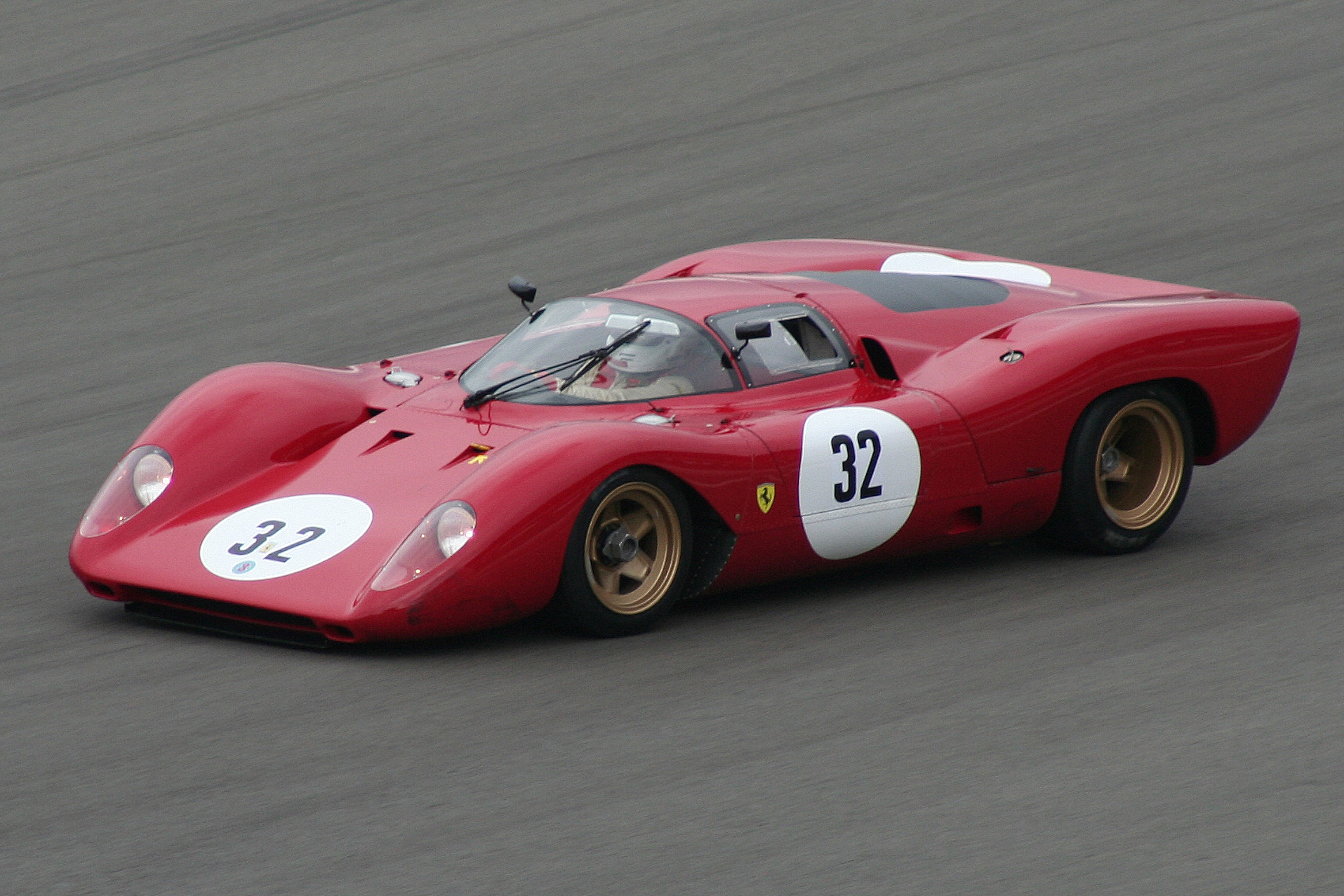
- Category: Group 6
- Designers: Mauro Forghieri; Giacomo Caliri; Gioacchino Colombo
- Production: 3
- Successor: Ferrari 312 PB

Technical specifications
- Chassis: Semi-Monocoque
- Suspension: Double wishbone suspension
- Length: 3,500 millimetres (140 in)
- Width: 1,880 millimetres (74 in)
- Height: 956 millimetres (37.6 in)
- Axle track: 1,425 millimetres (56.1 in) (Front); 1,400 millimetres (55 in) (Rear)
- Wheelbase: 2,220 millimetres (87 in)
- Engine: Colombo V12 2,991.01 cubic centimetres (182.523 cu in; 2.99101 L) Mid Engine, RWD Longitudinal
- Transmission: 5-speed + 1 reverse Manual
- Power: 331 kilowatts (444 bhp; 450 PS) @ 10,800 rpm 465 newton-metres (343 lbf⋅ft)
- Weight: 585 kilograms (1,290 lb)

Competition history
- Notable drivers: Pedro Rodriguez; Chris Amon; Luigi Chinetti; Tony Adamowicz; David Piper; Mario Andretti; Mike Parkes; Sam Posey; Chuck Parsons; Peter Schetty; George Eaton; Jean-Francois Jaunet
Entries	Races	Wins	Podiums	Poles
20	15	3	2	2

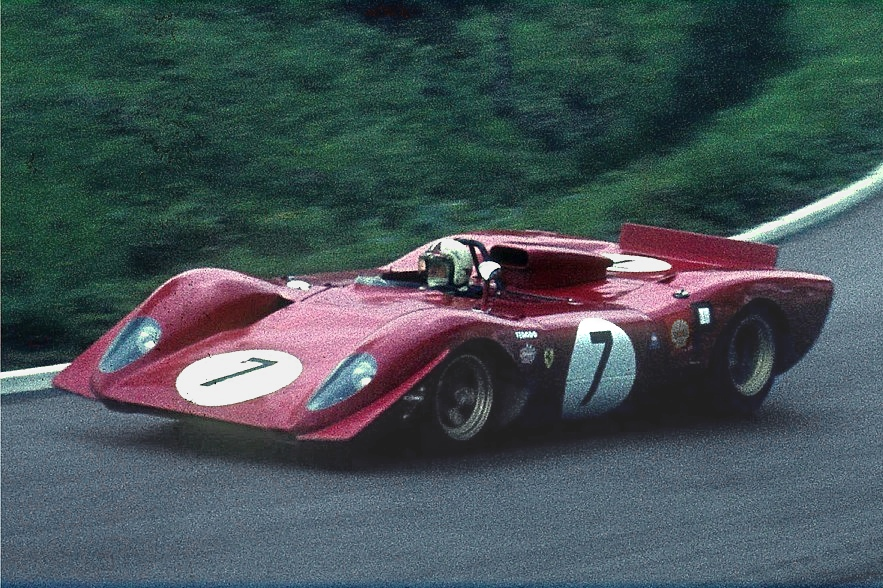
Ferrari 312 P driven by Chris Amon in the 1969 1000km Nürburgring

The Ferrari 312 P was a Group 6 Prototype used for racing in 1969 and 1970. It used a V12-engine derived from the F1 car Ferrari 312, detuned for endurance.

When the F1 car was fitted with a flat-12 engine with lower center of gravity, called boxer and marked Ferrari 312B, also the new 1971 version of the sports prototype came with the boxer engine, thus the Ferrari 312 PB is the successor.

== History ==
After boycotting sports car racing in 1968 to protest a rule change that also banned their 4-litre 330 P4, Ferrari built a 3000cc prototype in 1969, the 312 P. It was hardly more than a 3-litre F1 Ferrari 312 with open Barchetta, and later the closed top Berlinetta.

== Car in racing ==
The first registered race was at the 12 Hours of Sebring in 1969. Ferrari (short on money) started only one 312 P (chassis no. 0868). Mario Andretti got pole position, and with Chris Amon, he managed to finish second. This raised hopes for a prospective Ferrari victory. At the ensuing test weekend at Le Mans, a different car, chassis no. 0870, disappointed, and it was clear that better aerodynamics (with a closed coupe) were necessary. The 0870 also raced at the BOAC 500 in Brands Hatch, where Amon and Pedro Rodríguez finished fourth (behind three new open top Porsche 908/02). At 1000km Monza, Chris Amon took the pole with the 312 P spider, ahead of Jo Siffert's 908 LH coupé, but had to retire. The 312 P was not entered in the second Italian race, the 1969 Targa Florio were Porsche dominated. It had to retire in the German 1000 km Nürburgring. At the 1000 km Spa race, the 312 P of Rodriguez and David Piper was second behind the Siffert/Redman 908 LH. The two 312 Ps were entered in the 1969 24 Hours of Le Mans, now as low-drag Berlinettas. They were fifth and sixth on the grid, but didn't finish. The Amon car was damaged in the fatal crash of John Woolfe in the first lap. The other car was affect by oil leaks ran and ran in the top 10 for about 15 hours.

Ferrari 312 P
Ferrari 312P at Goodwood Festival of Speed 2009

The appearance of the Porsche 917 at the Geneva show in March 1969 had made clear that only a similar new prototype-like 5-litre "sports car" would be able to challenge it until the loop hole expires after 1971. Since mid-1969, Ferrari spent some of the millions earned in the Fiat deal for the construction of the required series of 25 new 5-litre V12 Group 5 sports cars which accordingly was called 512S.

At the end of the 1969 season the two remaining 312 Ps were sold to Luigi Chinetti's North American Racing Team, since the European branch of Ferrari racing would rely on the Ferrari 512S in 1970. The NART 312Ps returned to Europe for the 1970 24 Hours of Le Mans, where one of them was raced, along with eleven 512. The 312P was among the 16 cars still running at the end.

Later in 1970 the 512S was upgraded to the modified 512M, but then the big 512 was abandoned by the factory and only entered by customers in 1971 while the Scuderia introduced a Ferrari 312 PB with the flat-12 "boxer" engine that would be raced for three seasons.

== Specifications ==
Top speed: 320 km/h (198.84 mph)

Engine
Type: rear, longitudinal V12 60°
Bore/stroke: 78.5 x 51.5 mm
Unitary displacement: 249.25 cc
Total displacement: 2991.01 cc
Compression ratio: 11,5:1
Maximum power: 331 kW (450 PS) at 10.800 RPM
Power per litre: 150 PS/l
Valve actuation: Twin overhead camshaft per bank, four valves per cylinder
Fuel feed: Lucas indirect injection // Ignition = Single spark plug per cylinder, electronic
Lubrication: Dry sump
Clutch: Multi-plate

Chassis
Frame: tubular steel
Front and rear suspension: Independent, unequal-length wishbones, coil springs, telescopic shock absorbers, anti-roll bar
Brakes: Discs
Transmission: 5-speed + reverse
Steering: Rack-and-pinion
Fuel tank: Capacity 117 litres
Front tyres: 9-22-13
Rear tyres: 13-26-15

Bodywork
Type: Two-seater spider
Length: 3500 mm
Width: 1880 mm
Height: 956 mm
Wheelbase: 2220 mm
Front track: 1425 mm
Rear track: 1400 mm
Weight: 585 kg (with liquids)

== Bibliography ==
- Bamsey, Ian (1 October 1986). Ferrari 312 & 512 Sports Racing Cars: The Porsche Hunters. G T Foulis & Co Ltd. ISBN 978-0-85429-577-7.
- Collins, Peter; McDonough, Ed (1 November 2009). Ferrari 312P & 312PB (WSC Giants). Veloce Publishing. ISBN 978-1-84584-259-8.
- Car: The Definitive Visual History of the Automobile. Penguin. 2011. ISBN 978-0-7566-8938-4.
