= Joe Buzzetta =

American sportscar racer (1938–2023)

- Born: Joseph C. Buzzetta; 30 December 1938 Brooklyn, New York
- Died: 15 January 2023 (aged 84) Saint James, New York

Joseph "Joe" Buzzetta (30 December 1938 – 15 January 2023) was a former sportscar racer, who raced as a Porsche factory driver in the 1960s.

== Career ==
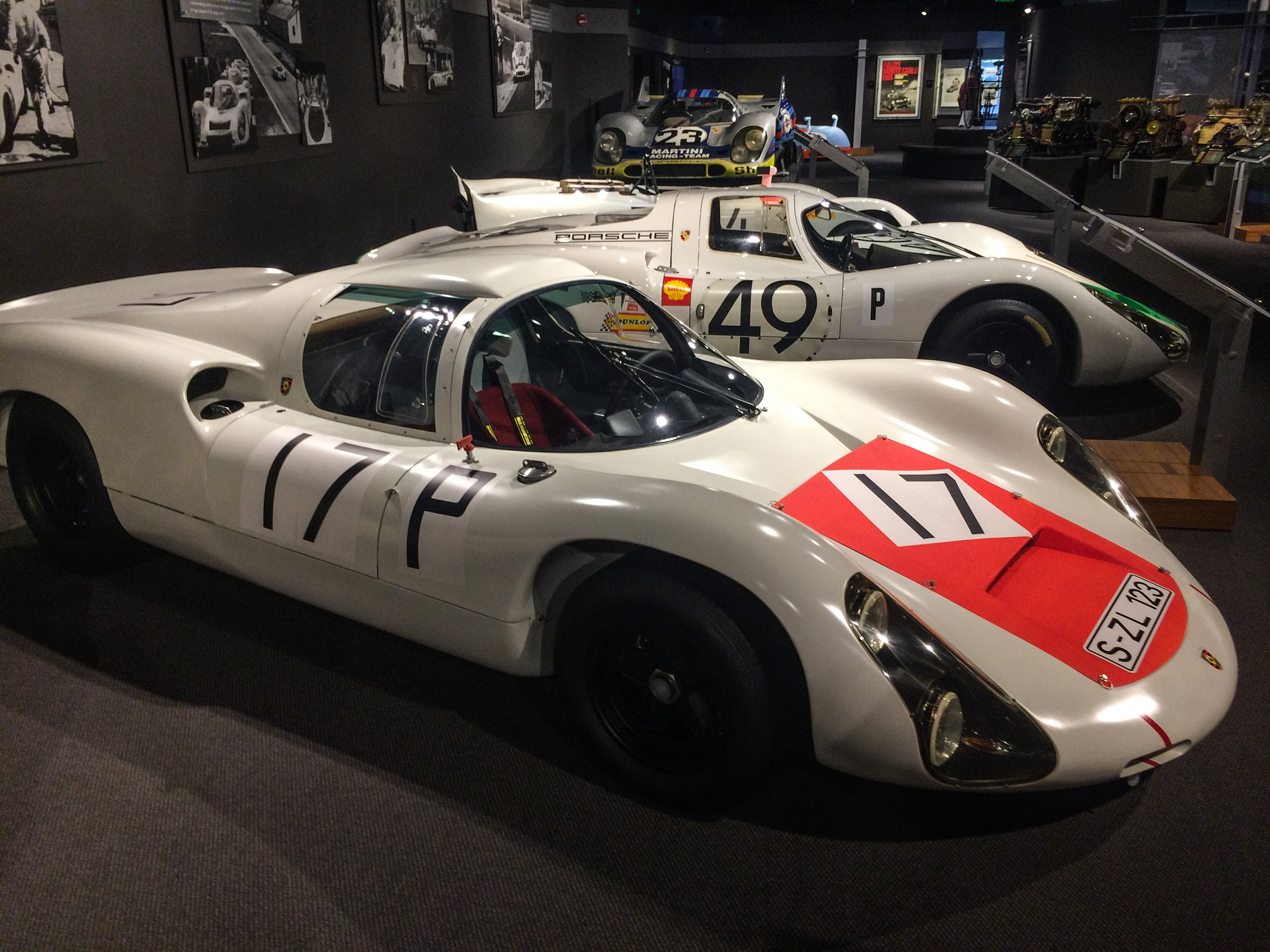
The Porsche 906 in which Buzzetta and Schütz won the 1967 Nürburgring 1000km (no. 17)

The son of a restaurant owner, Buzzetta started racing in the late 1950s, while stationed in Germany with the US Army; he bought an Austin Healey for local sportscar racing, and soon stepped up to a Porsche 356. On his return to the United States, he moved to Long Island and continued racing, mostly in Porsches. He won the Sports Car Club of America F-Modified title in 1962, the E-modified title in 1963, and shared the under-2 litre 1967 United States Road Racing Championship with Scooter Patrick.

His successes drew the attention of the Porsche factory team, and he earned several drives with the works outfit; his first being in the 1962 12 Hours of Sebring with Ben Pon. His most notable success was winning the 1967 Nürburgring 1000km in a 2-litre Porsche 910 with Udo Schütz, marking Porsche's first win in the event; attrition meant that Porsches ran 1-2-3-4 on the final lap, several minutes clear of the field, but the leading 2.2 litre Porsche 910 of Gerhard Mitter/Lucien Bianchi broke down at the Karussel, and would not re-start, despite Buzzetta and third-placed Gerhard Koch stopping to try to help Mitter re-start it. Buzzetta and Koch cruised around to the flag, Buzzetta taking it slightly ahead.

The win was technically Buzzetta's second in the Sportscar World Championship - he had driven a Porsche 904 to victory in the Bridgehampton Grand Prix under-2 litre race in 1964, a year in which the Fédération Internationale de l'Automobile had split the world title into separate categories. However the Bridgehampton race was little more than a domestic touring car race given a championship veneer, and even then the "Grand Prix" title went to the winner of the other race (Walt Hansgen in a Scarab).

In the blue riband sportscar races, his best finish was a 3rd in the 1968 24 Hours of Daytona (with Jo Schlesser in a Porsche 907) and 1969 12 Hours of Sebring (with Rolf Stommelen and Kurt Ahrens in a Porsche 908). He led the 1969 24 Hours of Daytona with Richard Attwood after 8 hours, but the Porsche's exhaust broke and the car was withdrawn. Buzzetta was less successful at the 24 Hours of Le Mans, only taking part in 1967 and 1968, retiring both times. He and Scooter Patrick had been contending for the lead in the 1968 race with eventual winner Pedro Rodríguez/Lucien Bianchi when an alternator failed, the Porsche's battery thereby running flat.

Buzzetta's two podium finishes in the 1969 World Sportscar Championship meant that, at the start of 1970, he was the only American driver officially graded for Grand Prix racing by the F.I.A.; however he never used that grading, as he retired from racing that year in order to run his business, with an offer from Mercedes-Benz for a huge dealership contingent on him giving up his Porsche connexions. He returned to the track in 1982 to take part in historic racing events; he was made a Suffolk Sports Hall of Fame member in 2007.

== Personal life ==
Buzzetta was married to Valerie before he started racing, and the couple had three children. All were involved in the car dealership business (Competition Auto Group) which Buzzetta founded in 1961, and his children survived him.

== Le Mans results ==
Year	Team	Co-Drivers	Car	Class	Laps	Pos.	Class Pos.
1967	(Germany) Porsche System Engineering	(Germany) Udo Schütz	Porsche 910/6	Prototype	84	ret	ret
1968	(Germany) Porsche System Engineering	(United States) Scooter Patrick	Porsche 908	Prototype	115	ret	ret

== External sites ==
- Biography
- Sports car results
- The Joe Buzzetta Collection
- Official obituary
