= Pacific Raceways =

Mixed-use road racing facility in Washington, United States

- Layout of Pacific Raceways (2002–present)
- Location: Lake Morton-Berrydale, Washington, near Kent, Washington, United States
- Coordinates: 47°19′12.2″N 122°8′42.6″W
- Capacity: 30,000
- Owner: Fiorito family
- Address: 31001 144th Ave SE
- Broke ground: 1959
- Opened: 1960
- Former names: Seattle International Raceways (1969–2001); Pacific Raceways (1960–1968)
- Major events: Current: NHRA Mission Foods Drag Racing Series NHRA Northwest Nationals (1975–1980, 1988–2019, 2022–present); Future: Trans-Am West Coast Championship (2027); Former: NASCAR Northwest Series (2003); MazdaSpeed Miata Cup (2003); NASCAR Winston West Series (1984–1985); AMA Superbike Championship (1981–1983, 1985); Trans-Am Series (1967–1970, 1975, 1977, 1982–1984); SCCA L&M Championship (1969–1971, 1973); USAC IndyCar (1969); United States Road Racing Championship (1963–1968)
- Website: https://pacificraceways.com/

Full Circuit (2002–present)
- Surface: Asphalt and concrete
- Length: 2.250 mi (3.621 km)
- Turns: 10

Original Circuit (1960–2001)
- Surface: Asphalt and concrete
- Length: 2.250 mi (3.621 km)
- Turns: 9
- Race lap record: 1:15.310 ( (United Kingdom) Brian Redman, Lola T330, 1973, F5000)

Drag Strip
- Surface: Asphalt and concrete
- Length: 0.250 mi (0.402 km)

Pacific Raceways is a mixed-use road racing and drag racing facility that is right near Kent, Washington, United States. The race track was constructed in 1959 and it opened the year after in 1960. The track was originally named Kent Pacific Raceways, then it became known as Seattle International Raceways in 1969. After the landowner regained control of the track in 2002, the name reverted to Pacific Raceways.

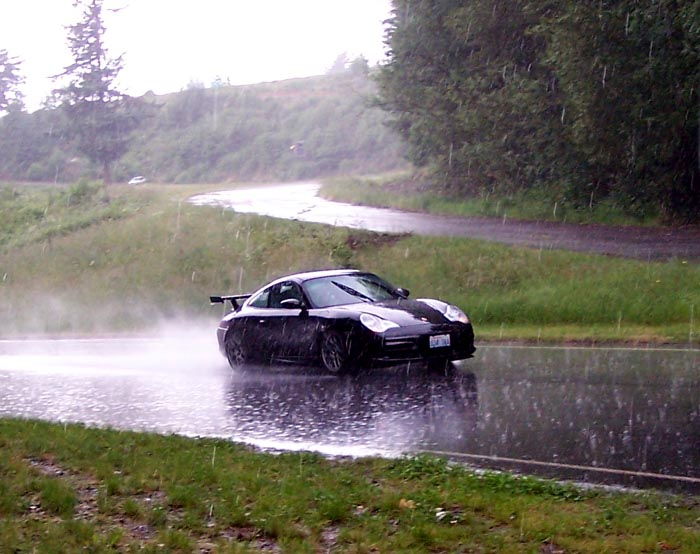
A Porsche participating in a June 2005 BMW club track day

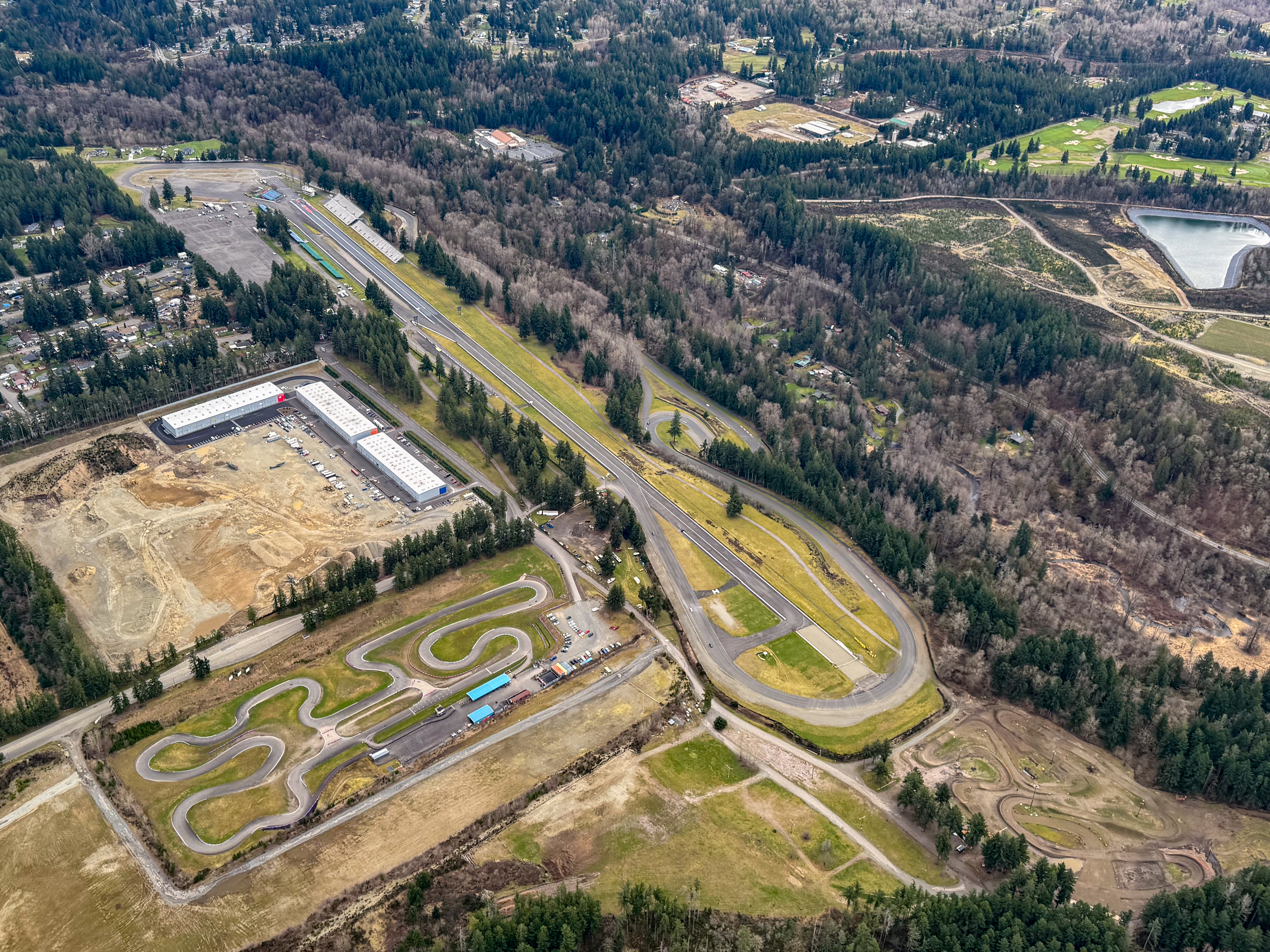
Pacific Raceways aerial view

Pacific Raceways features a 2.250 mi (3.621 km) road course which is used by the SCCA, Society of Vintage Racing Enthusiasts (SOVREN), and ICSCC for automobile road racing. The Washington Motorcycle Road Racing Association (WMRRA) uses the course for motorcycle road racing. The course has more than 125 ft (38 m) of elevation change and a naturally wooded back section.

The track has hosted two NASCAR Winston West Series between 1984 and 1985, won by Jim Bown and Dale Earnhardt respectively and also hosted a NASCAR Northwest Series race in 2003, won by Jeff Jefferson.

Pacific Raceways hosts a performance driving school which offers several curricula, including sanctioned race licensing courses, performance driving, lapping clinics, and specialty driving instruction.

The facility also features a dragstrip, which hosts the NHRA Mission Foods Drag Racing Series Northwest Nationals and regional races, plus a dirt motocross track.

Since 1988, Pacific Raceways has been home to the Northwest Nationals (originally known as the Seafair Nationals) of the NHRA Drag Racing Series.

The track played an important role during the heyday of professional sports car racing in the U.S. during the 1960s. From 1963 through 1968, Pacific Raceways hosted the Pacific Northwest Grand Prix, which was a round of the United States Road Racing Championship. From 1967 through 1970, the venue hosted an annual round of the SCCA Trans-Am Series, including the season finales in 1967 and 1968. The Trans-Am Series returned to the track in 1975, 1977, and 1982 through 1984. The SCCA Continental Championship for Formula 5000 cars visited the track from 1969 through 1971, and again in the 1973 season.

The track hosted a two heat race weekend of the USAC Championship Car series in 1969. The first heat was won by Mario Andretti and the second was won by Al Unser.

Among the other champion drivers who have visited victory lane at Pacific Raceways are Mark Donohue, Brian Redman, David Hobbs, Ronnie Bucknum, Peter Gregg, Tony Adamowicz, Parnelli Jones, Elliott Forbes-Robinson, Pedro Rodriguez, Dave MacDonald, Ken Miles, Jim Hall and Jerry Titus.

== Lap records ==
The fastest official race lap records at Pacific Raceways (formerly known as Seattle International Raceways) are listed as follows below:

Category	Time	Driver	Vehicle	Event
Original Course (1960–2001): 2.250 mi (3.621 km)
Formula 5000	1:15.310	Brian Redman	Lola T330	1973 Seattle F5000 round
Group 7	1:18.300	Mark Donohue	McLaren M6A	1968 Pacific North West Grand Prix
Sports prototype	1:19.500	Jerry Grant	Lola T70	1966 Pacific North West Grand Prix
Trans-Am Series	1:22.890	Willy T. Ribbs	Mercury Capri	1984 Seattle Trans-Am round
Group 4	1:26.800	Don Wester	Porsche 906	1966 Pacific North West Grand Prix

=== Drag strip records ===
Category	E.T.	Speed	Driver	Event	Ref
Top Fuel	3.685		Antron Brown	2016 Protect The Harvest.com NHRA Northwest Nationals	
Top Fuel		337.41 mph (543.01 km/h)	Doug Kalitta	2024 NHRA Northwest Nationals	
Funny Car	3.832		Del Worsham	2016 Protect The Harvest.com NHRA Northwest Nationals	
Funny Car		338.51 mph (544.78 km/h)	Bob Tasca III	2024 NHRA Northwest Nationals	
Pro Stock	6.488		Chris McGaha	2015 NHRA Northwest Nationals	
Pro Stock		213.40 mph (343.43 km/h)	Chris McGaha	2015 NHRA Northwest Nationals	
Pro Stock Motorcycle	6.704		Jianna Evaristo	2024 NHRA Northwest Nationals	
Pro Stock Motorcycle		203.95 mph (328.23 km/h)	Jianna Evaristo	2024 NHRA Northwest Nationals	

== See also ==
- Jerry Ruth, NHRA world champion who frequently raced at Pacific Raceways
