= Porsche 907 =

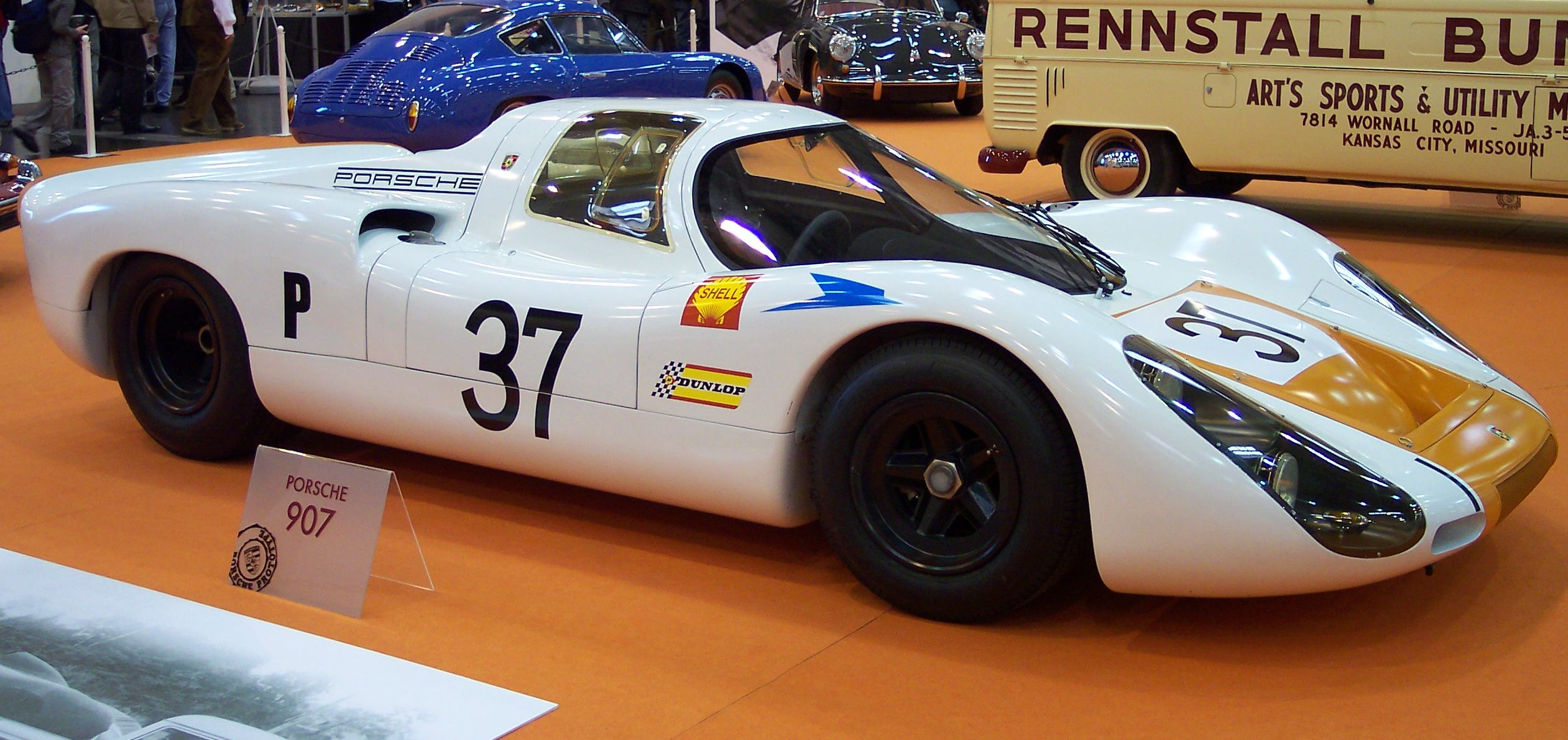

Overview
- Production: 1967-1968
- Designer: Ferdinand Piëch

Chronology
- Predecessor: Porsche 910
- Successor: Porsche 908

The Porsche 907 is a sportscar racing prototype built by Porsche for the 1967 World Sportscar Championship season to succeed the Porsche 910. It was raced by the factory also in 1968, and was fitted with flat-6 or flat-8 engines with 2000cc or 2200cc, to be entered in both prototype classes.

== 1967 ==
The 907 was introduced late in the 1967 World Sportscar Championship at the 1967 24 Hours of Le Mans. Following a suggestion by Ferdinand Piëch, the position of the driver was moved from the traditional left (as in German road cars) to the right as this gives advantages on the predominant clockwise race tracks.

With a new longtail body, the 907s reached 302 km/h (190 mph) on the straight, even though all used the reliable 220 hp Porsche 910 2000cc 6-cyl rather than the more powerful but complicated 8-cyl Type 771. Vented brake disks were being used as standard from that point on. The best Porsche 907 finished 5th, beaten only by pairs of 7.0l V8-powered Ford GT40 Mk.IV and 4.0l V12 Ferrari 330P4 with much bigger engines.

As the record-breaking performances of the Ford GT40 Mk.IV prototypes, fastest Le Mans race lap at 238.01 km/h (147.89 mph) and Winner's Average Speed 218.04 km/h (135.48 mph), had triggered rumors about a future rule change, namely engine sizes getting limited to 3 litre as in Formula 1 since 1966, Porsche started to prepare themselves in summer of 1967. The 907 was equipped with the enlarged 270 hp 2200cc Type 771/1 8-cyl which was then modified for the rules of the new 3 litre prototype category that was announced in late 1967 to come in effect already for the 1968 World Sportscar Championship. With the hitherto dominant cars retired, all manufacturers had the chance to use a 3 litre engine both in F1 and Sportscars endurance racing, but this proved to be impractical even in the 1970s.

A Porsche engine with the full 3000cc would have to be developed first, though, to be introduced in the future Porsche 908.

== 1968 ==
From 1968, the big V8 and V12 prototypes of Ford and Ferrari were banned, and Porsche hoped to secure the World Sportscar Championship and maybe an overall win at Le Mans as the competition at Ford, Matra and Alfa Romeo was not prepared with suitable 3000cc prototypes yet, either. Ferrari even sat out the whole of 1968 as a protest against the rule change. Apart from the former 2000cc-class rivals Alfa Romeo T33/2 and Renault-powered Alpine, 5000cc sportscars were also permitted to enter if at least 50 of them had been built. This loophole was intended to fill the grid with cars dating mainly from 1965, like Ford GT40 and Lola T70.

Porsche was serious. Unlike during the rather modest earlier years, four cars were entered in the 1968 24 Hours of Daytona, supported by 20 mechanics and engineers. The drivers wore cooling vests developed by NASA as the oil-cooler and the hot oil pipes caused heat in the closed cockpit.

After the #53 car of Gerhard Mitter had a big crash caused by tyre failure in the banking, his teammate Rolf Stommelen supported the #54 driven by Vic Elford/Jochen Neerpasch. When the #52 car of the longtime leaders Jo Siffert/Hans Herrmann dropped to second due to a technical problem, these two also drove on the #54 car in case theirs broke down. Due to this, five pilots won the race, and two of them scored also second. The #51 Jo Schlesser/Joe Buzzetta car completed the 1-2-3 side-by-side parade finish that the Ferrari prototypes had shown a year earlier at the banked finish line. The three Alfa Romeo T33/2's were even beaten by a Ford Mustang.

The 1968 12 Hours of Sebring saw a 1-2 finish for the Porsche 907, with the Jo Siffert/Hans Herrmann car winning and the Vic Elford/Jochen Neerpasch car finishing 2nd. The Gerhard Mitter/Rolf Stommelen and Ludovico Scarfiotti/Joe Buzzetta cars were victims of engine failures. Daytona & Sebring marked the first back-to-back major outright wins for the company, and French journalist (and occasional racer) Bernard Cahier wrote, "it's hard to imagine that anyone could beat Porsche to the championship this year." Their World Sportscars Championship hopes would be significantly changed soon, though.

The next race was the BOAC 500 at Brands Hatch, on April 7, 1968. That fateful day, Jim Clark was supposed to drive one of the new Ford F3L P68 prototypes with the Cosworth DFV engine, entered by Alan Mann Racing. Clark instead was driving a Formula 2 at Hockenheimring to show the new sponsorship logos for Team Lotus, and was killed. Jo Siffert/Hans Herrmann were fastest in qualifying ahead of Bruce McLaren/Mike Spence in the new Ford 3L, but none finished. It was the updated John Wyer-entered Ford GT40 of Jacky Ickx/Brian Redman which won ahead of the remaining two Porsche 907's after being only 5th on the grid.

In races on faster tracks like the 1000km Monza, these modified old Ford GT40's entered by John Wyer Automotive proved to be an unexpectedly strong force. The loophole for these 5-liter sportscars to be eligible for overall race wins and the championship had opened if at least 50 were built, to let the many existing Lola T70's take part, too. For 1969, the minimum number was lowered to 25, thus e. g. the over tow dozen Porsche 910 prototypes that had been made since 1966 were belatedly homologated in January 1969 as sportscars to let privateers race them for class wins and in minor events. It also opened an opportunity unexpected by many, namely that a manufacturer would not only built a few new prototypes with 3 litre engines, but would invest in developing and producing up front 25 brand new de-facto-prototypes with 5 litre engines only to have them either homologated as sportscars or fail, as there was no chance to use any of them in a WSC prototype class, or elsewhere, except maybe a few in CanAM, Formula Libre, future Interserie. In 1966, even Ferrari had failed to build enough 2 litre Ferrari Dino 206S, stopping at 18 made.

At the twisty Targa Florio, the only privately entered GT40 finished last, but the Alfa Romeo T33/2 were strong. In lap 1, Vic Elford had lost 18 minutes due to a tyre failure. Supported by veteran Umberto Maglioli, he showed a fantastic race in the 907, reminiscent of Juan Manuel Fangio's legendary 1957 German Grand Prix, beating the old lap record by one minute and winning by 3 minutes. Hans Herrmann & Jochen Neerpasch came in 4th among four Alfas. In the Porsche advertising poster celebrating the win, only an exhausted yet smiling Elford was shown, not the cars as usual.

The 1000km Nürburgring was won with the new Porsche 908 with its 3000cc engine, but it still was unreliable. The underpowered 2200cc 907 with less than half the Ford's displacement continued as Porsche's best entry in the 1000km Spa, Watkins Glen 6 Hours and 500km Zeltweg, losing to the Ford GT40's.

This set up the stage for a showdown at la Sarthe, as due to political unrest in France, the 1968 24 Hours of Le Mans had been postponed from its traditional mid-June date to the end of September. Porsche could not take advantage of the additional time to improve the 908 nor read the French rule book properly. For the first time, Porsche were the fastest in qualifying and the early stages of the race, but troubles with the 908's alternator caused delays and even disqualifications as the new Porsche staff had misinterpreted the repair rules..

For the third time in a row, a V8-powered Ford won the 24h classic. A Porsche 907LH came in second in front of the sole surviving 908. In addition, Ford had taken the World Sportscar Championship, too.

At that time, Porsche had already decided to make a risky investment in order to go one step further beyond the 3-liter 908 prototype: they committed themselves to develop a new 5-liter sportscar and built the required number of 25 in advance. This car was the legendary Porsche 917.

== 1969–1971 ==
During the following seasons, several 907s were entered by privateers, scoring occasional top-10 finishes, with a podium at Monza in 1969 and a 7th at the 1971 24 Hours of Le Mans being the more remarkable results.
