= Scooter Patrick =

American racing driver (1932–2016)

- Born: Merlin Goodwin Patrick; 30 December 1932 Hollywood, California
- Died: 27 September 2016 (aged 83) Kaysville, Utah

Merlin Goodwin "Scooter" Patrick (30 December 1932 – 27 September 2016) was an American racing driver.

== Career ==
Patrick began racing in an MG A in 1936, graduating to a Porsche in 1959 and being recruited to race for the Porsche agent in California, Otto Zipper, in the 1960s. He gained the nickname "Scooter" because he "scooted" around the track faster than anyone else. In Zipper's Porsche 906, Patrick won the United States Road Racing Championship in the 2-litre class in 1966, and was joint champion with future team-mate Joe Buzzetta the following season. He also won the Class B Modified title in the Sports Car Club of America Championship in 1968 and 1969, in Carroll Shelby's Toyota 2000GT and Alfa Romeo Tipo 33 respectively.

1967 saw Patrick score his best result in the World Sportscar Championship, finishing 3rd with Gerhard Mitter in a Porsche 910 at the 1967 Sebring 12 Hours race, and winning their class. In the 1968 Le Mans 24 Hours, Patrick and Buzzetta (again in a 910) fought for the lead with eventual winner Pedro Rodriguez' Ford GT40 in the seventh and eighth hours, but a broken alternator drained the battery, and the pair had to retire. It was his only Le Mans appearance.

At the end of 1969 Patrick tried out single-seater racing, with a couple of races in a Surtees TS5 run by James Garner in Formula A, which Patrick had tested, albeit without success; Patrick and Garner did however race together in the Baja 1000 that year in a Bill Stroppe Ford, finishing 4th in class. Patrick also tried out USAC Championship Car racing in 1970, with a race in a Bohannon Racing Eisert-Chevrolet at Indianapolis Raceway Park, but a mix-up with Mario Andretti while Patrick was being lapped saw the cars hook wheels, and the resulting collision put both, plus Ronnie Bucknum, out of the race.

In 1972, Patrick drove in the Can-Am Challenge Cup in Zipper's Alfa Romeo T33/3, fittingly bearing the number 33, and with a 4-litre engine the Autodelta had used at Watkins Glen International in 1971; Patrick recorded finishes at the back end of the top ten. In 1973 he moved to Herb Caplan's US Racing-run McLaren M8F. Patrick's sole win in the series was the final round in the original Can-Am series, at Road America in 1974, the M8F being two years old by then, and only coming after both Shadow DN4s retired; Patrick took third in the 1974 points.

It was Patrick's last race until a one-off appearance in the 1986 IMSA GT Championship, at the 6 Hours of Riverside, sharing a Chevrolet Corvette with Joseph DiLoreto and Jim Snelling to 19th place (sixth in class). In 2012, he renewed his SCCA licence in order to take part in historic racing.

== Personal life ==
Patrick married twice; he had two children from his first marriage, and three from his second. In 1971 he became a member of the Church of Jesus Christ of the Latter Day Saints. Post-racing he set up an automobile repair shop. He died in 2016 of Lewy body dementia.

== External sites ==
- Sports car and Can-Am results
