= Porsche 910 =

Porsche 910 Carrera 10
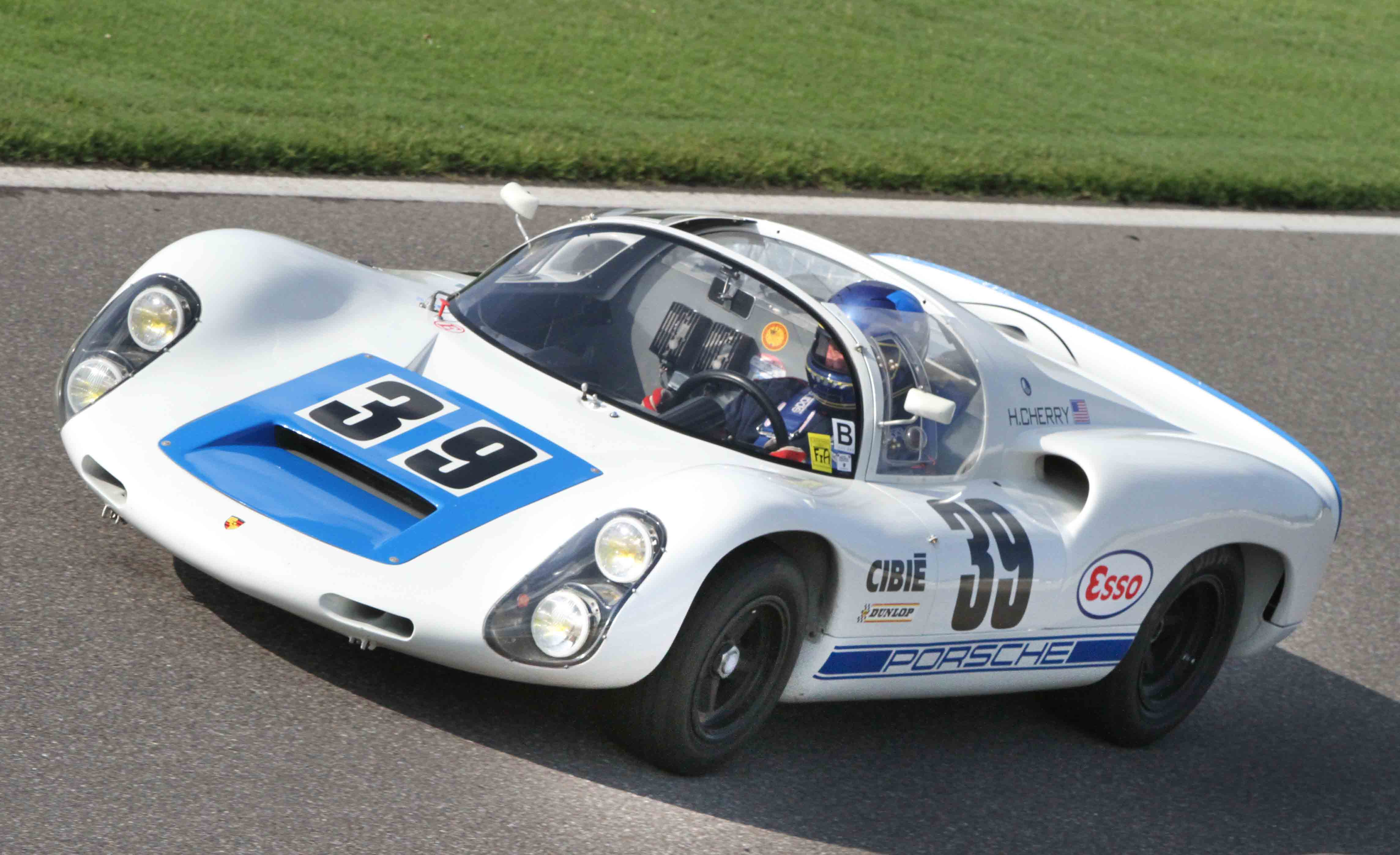
- A Porsche 910 at the Barber Motorsports Park Legends of Motorsport historic racing event in 2010.

Overview
- Manufacturer: Porsche
- Production: 1966-1967
- Designer: Helmuth Bott

Body and chassis
- Layout: Rear mid-engine, rear-wheel-drive layout

Chronology
- Predecessor: Porsche 906
- Successor: Porsche 907

The Porsche 910 or Carrera 10 are prototype race cars built by Porsche in late 1966 and early 1967 as less restricted evolutions of the "mass produced" (65 in total) street legal 2 litre Porsche 906 Carrera 6 that were made in early 1966 to FIA Group 4 Sportscar homologation requirements that included luggage space and spare wheel.

Unlike the 906, that also had carried over Porsche 904 parts, the 910 was not developed with the considerations necessary for FIA/CSI homologation, public road use, racing by customers, or economy in general. The chassis is a steel space frame design covered by a lightweight fiberglass body, fitted with up to date Formula 1 suspensions parts, wheels, tyres, different engines, and bodies. As the 906 had gullwing doors with hinges on the roof that had issues with remaining properly closed, the 910 doors hinged forward, which also allowed that the roof could be removed. The 910s were optimized for various use cases, as regular 906-like short tail (Kurzheck KH) cars, as low weight open top spyders for hillclimbing and twisty courses like Targa Florio and Nürburgring, or with low drag long tail (Langheck LH) coupé bodies for fast tracks like Monza, Spa, Le Mans.

Introduced in the summer of 1966 at hillclimbs, the 910 was succeeded at the June 1967 Le Mans 24h by the more aerodynamic Porsche 907 with a smaller cabin in which the driver sits on the right side, as most road race tracks are run clockwise and sitting on the inside of a corner is better for weight distribution and orientation.

When the minimum number for sportscars was lowered to 25 for 1969, the over two dozen Porsche 910 prototypes that had been made since 1966 were belatedly homologated in January 1969 as sportscars to let privateers race them for class wins and in minor events. Due to close relation with the 906, additional requirements like luggage space and spare wheel could be met easily.

== History ==
The 906 was the forerunner of a whole new generation of Porsche competition machines. The first of these was the 910. Introduced in late 1966, there were two versions; a Spyder, equipped with a 2.0 liter flat 8-cylinder engine, and the Coupe, powered by either a 2.0 liter 901/20 flat 6-cylinder or a 2.2 liter Typ 771 flat 8-cylinder.

The windshield was carried over from the 906, but the suspension was changed dramatically. Both the Spyder and the Coupe used a suspension design similar to the Formula One cars of the day, with 13 inch wheels at all four corners. The Spyder, built as a hill climb car, differed from the Coupe in other, minor ways like the use of a two-gallon fuel tank.

The body was changed in a number of ways from the 906. Due to the use of 13-inch wheels, the wheel arches could be smaller, allowing a better view out the windshield. The large rear plastic window of the 906 was abandoned, as were its gull wing doors. The 910 doors hinged forward, and the center roof section between could be removed to make it an open cockpit car. Like the 906, the rear body section hinged rearward to allow access to the drivetrain.

A total of 28 examples were built. Originally contesting the 2-liter prototype class, when FIA rules were changed allowing a minimum of 25 cars to be produced, the now two year old 910 was nearly automatically qualified as a FIA Group 4 competition sports car. Homologation was granted in January 1969.

With the 910 and 906, Porsche completely dominated the 2-liter classes in 1967, and challenged for some overall wins. Outgunned by the larger engined Ford GT40 and Ferrari Prototypes on the long tracks, 910s usually finished in the top five, while handily winning their class. Results in early 1967, like 4th at Daytona followed by 3rd at Sebring and Monza, and 2nd at Spa, were topped only by a pair of overall wins at the Targa Florio and again at the Nürburgring 1000km. The 910 also won every hill climb that counted towards the World Sportscar Championship.

=== Racing history ===
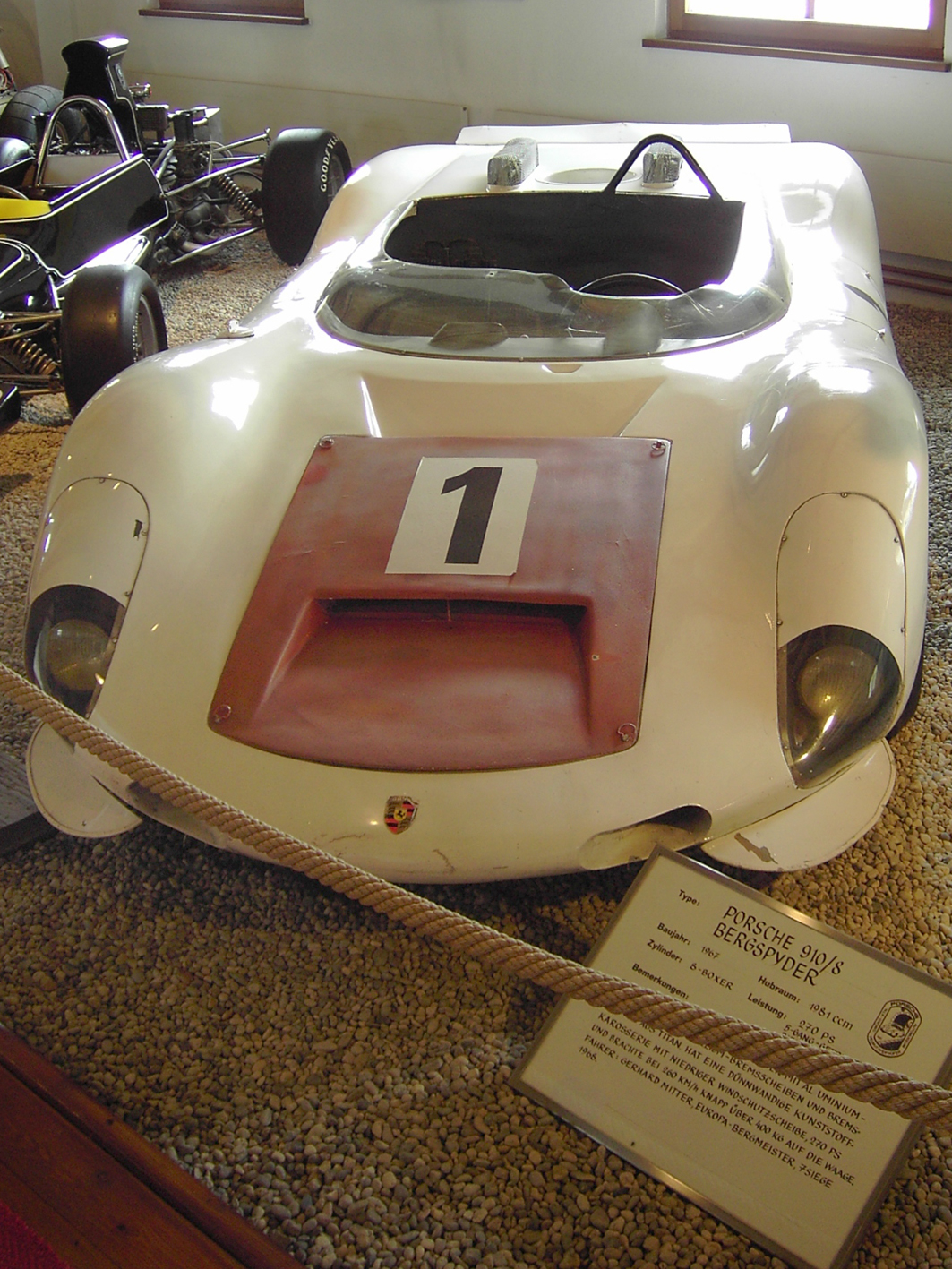
Porsche 910/8 "Bergspyder" on static display in the Porsche Automuseum Helmut Pfeifhofer in Gmünd.

With the rapid pace of the Porsche racing program in the late 1960s, factory development and competition use of the 910 was measured in months in late 1966 and in early 1967.

The win at the 1967 Nürburgring 1000 Kilometres was accomplished by a fleet of six factory cars, entered in an attempt to score the first overall win at Porsche's home event. Two 910/8s, one driven by Stommelen and another driven by Siffert, failed to finish due to valve damage. The remaining 910/8, with Mitter at the wheel, suffered an electrical problem near the end of the race and finished fourth behind the three 6-cylinder 910s. This impressive 1-2-3-4 victory at the home race gave Porsche its first outright win in a major World Sportscar Championship event other than the Targa Florio (first wins non-WC in 1956, and WSC in 1959) and the 12 Hours of Sebring (1960).

At the 1967 24 Hours of Le Mans a month later, a new Porsche 907 LH finished 5th, seven laps ahead of a 910 KH and two 906 Sportscars. The only competition for Porsche in the 2.0 classes came from two BRM-powered Matra-Simca MS630, as neither of three each entered Alfa Romeo Tipo 33 and Ferrari Dino 206 S showed up for the 24h race.

In hill climb competition, the short and light open-top 910/8 Bergspyder, with its Type 771 8-cylinder engine, won both the 1967 and 1968 European championships. At Course de Côte d'Ollon-Villars, which counted towards the World Sportscar Championship in 1967, the 910 achieved a 1-2 finish, with Gerhard Mitter and Rolf Stommelen beating Herbert Müller in a V12 Ferrari 412P Berlinetta.

While Porsche was looking to the future with the 907 prototype race car by the end of 1967, a rule change reducing the minimum number to 25 allowed that the 910 was belatedly homologated as Gr.4 Sportscar in early 1969, thus the former prototypes saw continued success as sportscars in the hands of private racing teams well into the 1970s.
