= Chuck Parsons =

American racing driver

Charles Walter Parsons (February 6, 1924 – January 3, 1999) was an American sports car racing driver. Parsons drove in SCCA and USSRC competition, then became a driver in the Can Am series. Like many drivers of the era, he participated in multiple venues, such as the 24 Hours of Daytona and 24 Hours of Le Mans endurance races while driving the same year in the Can Am series.

== Career ==
Parsons was born in 1924 in Bruin, Kentucky. He moved to California at age 24 and settled near Monterey. Parsons worked in automobile sales and eventually owned his own import car lot.

At age 31, Parsons bought his first competition car, an Austin-Healey, from the proceeds of his work in sales. After he raced the Healey in amateur events, he moved on briefly to a Porsche, then a Lotus type 15. In 1959, he bought a Maserati Birdcage racer from Texan Jim Hall, later of Chaparral cars fame. Following his experience with the Maserati, which turned out to be expensive to operate, Parsons sold the Birdcage and raced a Sunbeam Alpine roadster. The Alpine racing effort was sponsored by Randy Hilton. During the 1963 SCCA season in California, he raced a Lotus 23B twin cam. By 1964, he was driving an AC Cobra roadster powered by a 289 cubic inch Ford V8. In 1965, he campaigned a Genie - Chevy Mark 10. In 1966, he switched to a McLaren-Elva Mark II, and won the USSRC Championship, with a win at the final race at Road America, and second-place finishes at Laguna Seca Raceway, Mid-Ohio Sports Car Course, and Las Vegas.

Later in 1966, Parsons began driving in the Canadian American Challenge Cup with a Chevrolet powered McLaren. Parsons drove a series of historic Can Am cars over the next six years. In 1968, he drove a Lola T160, the following two years a Lola T163. During the 1971 Can Am campaign, Parsons raced a McLaren M8D, another Lola T163, and eventually returned to the cockpit of a McLaren M8D by the end of the season. The last M8D he drove belonged to actor-driver Paul Newman. The original Can Am series was from 1966 to 1974. In the years that Parsons participated, he scored 145 points, which places him eighth overall among Can Am drivers. His highest total was 81 points in 1969.

1969 was also the year of his highest finish as an endurance race car driver, when he won the prestigious 24 Hours of Daytona with Mark Donohue as a co-driver in a Penske Racing Lola T70 coupe. Parsons had been a last-minute substitute for an injured team driver, and Donohue gave Parsons credit as being key to the win, even though Donohue drove most of the race. In 1970, Parsons drove a Ferrari 312P at the rainy 24 Hours of Le Mans race, where he finished 8th overall with fellow American driver Tony Adamowicz. In addition to Donohue and Adamowicz, Parsons teamed once with Jo Bonnier at Watkins Glen International in 1969.

Parsons also briefly drove Formula 5000 and, in 1967, drove in a USAC Championship Car race at Riverside International Raceway.

After his racing career, Parsons lived in California until his death on January 3, 1999.

== Racing results ==
=== 24 Hours of Le Mans results ===
Year	Team	Co-Drivers	Car	Class	Laps	Pos.	Class Pos.
1967	(United States) North American Racing Team	(Mexico) Ricardo Rodríguez Cavazos	Ferrari 365 P2	P 5.0	30	DNF	DNF
1970	(United States) North American Racing Team	(United States) Tony Adamowicz	Ferrari 312 P Coupé	P 3.0	281	NC	NC
