= 1972 Road Atlanta Can-Am =

1972 race in Braselton, Georgia

Layout of Road Atlanta (1970-1997)

The 1972 Road Atlanta Can-Am race was the second round of the 1972 Can-Am season. It was held July 9, 1972, at Road Atlanta in Braselton, Georgia. It was the third Can-Am race held at the track.

== Results ==
- Pole position: Denny Hulme, 1:14.134 (122.373 mph (196.940 km/h))
- Fastest lap: Peter Revson, 1:16.281 (118.929 mph (191.398 km/h))
- Race distance: 189.06 miles (304.26 km)
- Winner's average speed: 114.123 miles per hour (183.663 km/h)

Pos	No	Driver	Car	Team	Laps	Time/Retired	Grid	Points
1	6	(United States) George Follmer	Porsche 917/10 TC	(United States) Penske Racing	75	1:39:36.200	2	20
2	2	(United States) Gregg Young	McLaren M8F-Chevrolet	(United States) Young American Racing Team	74	-1 lap	7	15
3	0	(United States) Milt Minter	Porsche 917/10	(United States) Vasek Polak Racing Team	74	-1 lap	5	12
4	23	(United States) Charlie Kemp	Lola T222-Chevrolet	(United States) Bobby Rinzler	73	-2 laps	11	10
5	59	(United States) Peter Gregg	Porsche 917/10	(United States) Peter Gregg	72	-3 laps; out of fuel	6	8
6	11	(United States) Lothar Motschenbacher	McLaren M8D-Chevrolet	(United States) Motschenbacher Racing	71	-4 laps	9	6
7	1	(United Kingdom) David Hobbs	Lola T310-Chevrolet	(United States) Carl Haas	71	-4 laps	8	4
8	79	(United States) Chuck Parsons	Lola T160/3-Chevrolet	(United States) William Overhauser Racing	69	-6 laps	15	3
9	33	(United States) Scooter Patrick	Alfa Romeo T33/4	(United States) Otto Zipper Alfa Racing	69	-6 laps	13	2
10	55	(Canada) Roger McCaig	McLaren M8FP-Chevrolet	(Canada) McCaig Racing	68	-7 laps	12	1
11	61	(United States) Tom Heyser	Lola T260-Chevrolet	(United States) Albert Heyser	66	-9 laps	17	
12	50	(Canada) Gordon Dewar	McLaren M8C-Chevrolet	(Canada) JNO Racing	65	-10 laps	16	
13	17	(United States) Bob Nagel	Lola T222-Chevrolet	(United States) Bob Nagel	63	-12 laps	18	
14	34	(United States) George Drolsom	McLaren M8C-Chevrolet	(United States) George Drolsom	59	Blown engine	20	
15	15	(United States) William Wonder	McLaren M8C-Chevrolet	(United States) Bill Wonder	57	-18 laps	21	
16	99	(United States) Don Devine	McLaren M12-Chevrolet	(United States) Don Devine	49	-26 laps	19	
DNF	77	(United States) Bob Klempel	McLaren M1C-Chevrolet	(United States) Bob Klempel	42	Oil leak	22	
DNF	96	(United States) Steve Durst	McLaren M8E-Chevrolet	(United States) Steve Durst	33	Blown engine	10	
DNF	22	(France) François Cevert	McLaren M8F-Chevrolet	(United States) Young American Racing Team	20	Camshaft	4	
DNF	101	(United Kingdom) Jackie Oliver	Shadow Mk.3-Chevrolet	(United States) Advanced Vehicle Systems	20	Blown engine	14	
DNF	35	(United States) Danny Hopkins	Lola T160-Chevrolet	(United States) Danny Hopkins	13	Stopped on course	23	
DNF	4	(United States) Peter Revson	McLaren M20-Chevrolet	(United Kingdom) Bruce McLaren Motor Racing	13	Rotor arm	3	
DNF	5	(New Zealand) Denny Hulme	McLaren M20-Chevrolet	(United Kingdom) Bruce McLaren Motor Racing	4	Accident	1	
DNS	-	(United States) Jerry Hodges	McKee-Hodges Mk.2-Chevrolet	(United States) Jerry Hodges				
DNS	9	(Canada) John Cordts	McLaren M8D-Chevrolet	(United States) William Overhauser Racing				
DNS	81	(United States) Dick Durant	Lola T163-Chevrolet	(United States) Dick Durant				
