= 1972 Trans-American Sedan Championship =

Motorsport competition

1972 Trans-Am Series

Seasons
- ← 1971 1973 →

The 1972 Trans-American Championship was the seventh running of the Sports Car Club of America's Trans-Am Series. The first seven rounds used split classes, while the last four rounds had the Under 2500cc class only. Milt Minter brought Pontiac its first win, at Mid-Ohio. George Follmer and American Motors won the over 2.5L division, while John Morton led Datsun to the championship title of the "Two-Five Challenge".

1972 is considered to be the end of the series' "golden era". From 1973 onward, Trans Am would evolve into a lesser clone of the rival IMSA GT Championship, with similarly modified cars, but with a more conventional focus with vehicles such as the Chevrolet Beretta being used. IMSA GT's focus on exotic cars such as Ferraris and Porsches provided a more adaptable format, in comparison to Trans Am's reliance on domestic performance sedans.

== Schedule ==
Rnd	Date	Circuit	Distance	Over 2.5 Winning Car	Under 2.5 Winning Car
Rnd	Date	Circuit	Distance	Over 2.5 Winning Driver(s)	Under 2.5 Winning Driver(s)
1	May 6	Lime Rock Park, Lakeville, Connecticut	130.05 mi (209.30 km) (U2L); 200.43 mi (322.56 km) (O2L)	AMC Javelin	Datsun 510
1	May 6	Lime Rock Park, Lakeville, Connecticut	130.05 mi (209.30 km) (U2L); 200.43 mi (322.56 km) (O2L)	(United States) George Follmer	(United States) Bob Sharp
2	May 29	Bryar Motorsports Park, Loudon, New Hampshire	112 mi (180 km) (U2L); 152 mi (245 km) (O2L)	AMC Javelin	Datsun 510
2	May 29	Bryar Motorsports Park, Loudon, New Hampshire	112 mi (180 km) (U2L); 152 mi (245 km) (O2L)	(United States) George Follmer	(United States) John Morton
3	June 4	Mid-Ohio Sports Car Course, Lexington, Ohio	120 mi (190 km) (U2L); 180 mi (290 km) (O2L)	Pontiac Firebird	Datsun 510
3	June 4	Mid-Ohio Sports Car Course, Lexington, Ohio	120 mi (190 km) (U2L); 180 mi (290 km) (O2L)	(United States) Milt Minter	(United States) Peter Gregg
4	June 17	Watkins Glen International, Watkins Glen, New York	114.818 mi (184.782 km) (U2L); 192.489 mi (309.781 km) (O2L)	AMC Javelin	Datsun 510
4	June 17	Watkins Glen International, Watkins Glen, New York	114.818 mi (184.782 km) (U2L); 192.489 mi (309.781 km) (O2L)	(United States) George Follmer	(United States) Peter Gregg
5	July 2 July 4	Donnybrooke International Speedway, Brainerd, Minnesota	150 mi (240 km) (U2L); 210 mi (340 km) (O2L)	AMC Javelin	Alfa Romeo GTV
5	July 2 July 4	Donnybrooke International Speedway, Brainerd, Minnesota	150 mi (240 km) (U2L); 210 mi (340 km) (O2L)	(United States) George Follmer	(Australia) Horst Kwech
6	July 16	Road America, Elkhart Lake, Wisconsin	108 mi (174 km) (U2L); 200 mi (320 km) (O2L)	Ford Mustang	Datsun 510
6	July 16	Road America, Elkhart Lake, Wisconsin	108 mi (174 km) (U2L); 200 mi (320 km) (O2L)	(United States) Warren Tope	(United States) John Morton
7	July 30	Sanair Super Speedway, Saint-Pie, Quebec	104 mi (167 km) (U2L); 169 mi (272 km) (O2L)	Ford Mustang	Alfa Romeo GTA
7	July 30	Sanair Super Speedway, Saint-Pie, Quebec	104 mi (167 km) (U2L); 169 mi (272 km) (O2L)	(United States) Warren Tope	(United States) Bert Everett
8	August 19	Road Atlanta, Braselton, Georgia	126 mi (203 km)	not contested	Datsun 510
8	August 19	Road Atlanta, Braselton, Georgia	126 mi (203 km)	not contested	(United States) John Morton
9	September 17	Portland International Raceway, Portland, Oregon	105.325 mi (169.504 km)	not contested	Datsun 510
9	September 17	Portland International Raceway, Portland, Oregon	105.325 mi (169.504 km)	not contested	(United States) John Morton
10	October 15	Laguna Seca Raceway, Monterey, California	102.5 mi (165.0 km)	not contested	Datsun 510
10	October 15	Laguna Seca Raceway, Monterey, California	102.5 mi (165.0 km)	not contested	(United States) John Morton
11	October 28	Riverside International Raceway, Riverside, California	127.5 mi (205.2 km)	not contested	Datsun 510
11	October 28	Riverside International Raceway, Riverside, California	127.5 mi (205.2 km)	not contested	(United States) John Morton

== Championships ==
=== Drivers' championships ===
The points system was as follows:

1st	2nd	3rd	4th	5th	6th	7th	8th	9th	10th
20	15	12	10	8	6	4	3	2	1

==== Over 2.5L ====
Pos	Driver	Car	LRP	BRY	MOH	WGL	DON	ELK	SAN	Pts
1	(United States) George Follmer	AMC Javelin	1	1	2	1	1	25		95
2	(United States) Milt Minter	Pontiac Firebird		2	1	28	4	2	25	60
3	(United States) Warren Tope	Ford Mustang	5	7	7	26	28	1	1	56
4	(United States) Warren Agor	Chevrolet Camaro	2	3	3	12	6	27	6	51
5	(United States) Bill Collins	AMC Javelin	7		4	29	7	3	2	45
6	(United States) Paul Nichter	Chevrolet Camaro	6	4		4	20	6	3	44
7	(United States) Roy Woods	AMC Javelin	4		5	3	3	11		42
8	(United States) Jerry Thompson	Ford Mustang			28	2	2	41		30
9	(United States) Carl Shafer	Chevrolet Camaro			11		8	7	4	17
10	(Canada) Dick Brown	Chevrolet Camaro				6		5	16	14
11	(United States) Gene Harrington	Chevrolet Camaro	8		35			4	21	13
12	(United States) Tony DeLorenzo	Pontiac Firebird	3				21			12
13	(United States) John Gimbel	Ford Mustang	21	11	25	5	27	31	8	11
14	(United States) Kent Fellows	Chevrolet Camaro	26	14	6	7	12	38	15	10
15=	(United States) J. Marshall Robbins	Ford Mustang		5						8
15=	(Canada) Alfred Ruys de Perez	Chevrolet Camaro	17	8	29	9	26	8	14	8
15=	(Canada) Steve Bradley	Chevrolet Camaro					5	21		8
15=	(United States) Dick Hoffman	Chevrolet Camaro			21			40	5	8
19=	(United States) Walter Parkins	Chevrolet Camaro		9	9	14	30	12	27	4
19=	(United States) Bob Bienerth	Chevrolet Camaro	14	13	13	18		17	7	4
21=	(United States) Dan Moore	Ford Mustang			8	13				3
21=	(United States) Martin Shook	Chevrolet Camaro	23	27	23	8		23		3
21=	(United States) Jerry Petersen	Chevrolet Camaro			31	10	9	30		3
24=	(Canada) Jean-Guy Roy	Chevrolet Camaro	9	22		23			13	2
24=	(United States) Warren Fairbanks	Chevrolet Camaro						9		2
24=	(United States) David Hoselton	Ford Mustang						15	9	2
24=	(United States) Steve Ross	Chevrolet Camaro	20	10	12				10	2
28=	(United States) Fred Kashkork	Ford Mustang	10							1
28=	(United States) Ed Hinchcliff	Ford Mustang	11	17	10	16	19			1
28=	(United States) Joe Chamberlain	Chevrolet Camaro					10	33		1
28=	(United States) J. A. Lagod	Chevrolet Camaro						10		1

Color	Result
Gold	Winner
Silver	2nd place
Bronze	3rd place
Green	4th & 5th place
Light Blue	6th–10th place
Dark Blue	Finished (Outside Top 10)
Purple	Did not finish
Black	Disqualified (DSQ)
White	Did not start (DNS)
Blank	Did not participate (DNP)
Blank	Not competing

==== Under 2.5L ====
Pos	Driver	Car	LRP	BRY	MOH	WGL	DON	ELK	SAN	ATL	POR	LAG	RIV	Pts
1	(United States) John Morton	Datsun 510	DSQ	1	16	2	12	1		1	1	1	1	135
2	(United States) Bert Everett	Alfa Romeo GTA	4	4	3	5	2	15	1	11		7	3	91
3	(Austria) Horst Kwech	Alfa Romeo GTV	19	17	4	3	1	5		15		2	17	65
4	(United States) Mike Downs	Datsun 510	2	6	2	4		2						61
5	(United States) Peter Gregg	Datsun 510			1	1	11						2	55
6	(United States) Bob Sharp	Datsun 510	1	2										35
7	(United States) Ken Schley	Alfa Romeo GTA					DSQ	6	2	4	10	28	11	32
8	(United States) Ed Wachs	Alfa Romeo GTA	5	9			4	7	19	DNS		27	20	24
9	(United States) John McCollister	Volkswagen Super Beetle	21	8	6	14		17	5	9	8	16	25	22
10	(United States) Harry Theodorocopulous	Alfa Romeo GTV	26	16	17	6	14	13	3		9	10	28	21
11=	(United States) Lothar Stahlberg	Datsun 510	3	13	5	13								20
11=	(United States) Richard Hull	Toyota 1600					5	3		16				20
11=	(United States) Walt Maas	Datsun 510									3	5	14	20
11=	(United States) Lee Midgley	Alfa Romeo GTA; Alfa Romeo GTV						4	17	12	17	4	12	20
15=	(United States) John Buffum	Ford Escort	15	3	21	7								16
15=	(United States) Vic Provenzano	Alfa Romeo GTA									4	6	19	16
17=	(United States) Sam Posey	Datsun 510						18		2				15
17=	(United States) Hershel McGriff	Datsun 510									2			15
17=	(United States) Corky Bell	Datsun 510					10	9		5			7	15
20=	(United States) Jerry Thompson	Datsun 510					3							12
20=	(United States) Dave Madison	Datsun 510								3			22	12
20=	(United States) Bobby Allison	Datsun 510										3	24	12
23	(United States) Tony Rolfe	BMW 1600				8	9	12		6				11
24=	(Canada) Ron Shantz	Datsun 510							4					10
24=	(Canada) Bob Stevens	Datsun 510									15		4	10
26	(United States) Ole Anderson	Volvo 142									6	8		9
27=	(United States) Wayne Sherer	Alfa Romeo GTA		5	15	20								8
27=	(United States) Richard Gordon	Volvo 142									5			8
27=	(United States) Bob Burns	Alfa Romeo GTA											5	8
30=	(United States) Jim Lombard	Volkswagen Super Beetle			12	10	6		16					7
30=	(United States) Gary Witzenburg	Datsun 510	12		7		15	8						7
32=	(United States) John Diamanti	Alfa Romeo GTV	6											6
32=	(Canada) Don Sobering	Austin Cooper							6					6
32=	(United States) Carl Fredricks	BMW											6	6
32=	(United States) Ed Long	Datsun 510			9					7				6
36	(United States) Ted Straight	Toyota 1600					7	10						5
37=	(United States) George Alderman	Datsun 510	7	18	18	15								4
37=	(United States) Mickey Cohen	Ford Pinto		7										4
37=	(Canada) Jacques Bienvenue	Ford Pinto							7					4
37=	(United States) Douglas Sande	Datsun 510									7			4
41=	(United States) Ed Rogers	Alfa Romeo GTA	8	15										3
41=	(United States) Bob Shafer	Datsun 510			8									3
41=	(United States) Tom Cronin	Austin Cooper					8	11						3
41=	(Canada) Monique Proulx	BMW 2002							8					3
41=	(United States) Vic Matthews	Toyota 1600								8				3
41=	(United States) Dave Redding	Datsun 510											8	3
47=	(United States) John Meskauskas	Datsun 510	9	14	14			16						2
47=	(United States) Stephen Sharkey	Volvo 122				9								2
47=	(United States) Robert LaZebnik	BMW 1600			22	11		DNS	9					2
47=	(United States) George Cheyne	Ford Pinto									DNS	9	26	2
47=	(United States) Jim Ethridge	Alfa Romeo GTA											9	2
52=	(United States) Paul Choiniere	Austin Cooper	10						12					1
52=	(United States) Art Mollin	Volvo 142	13	10		19								1
52=	(United States) A.L. Entwistle	BMW 2002			10									1
52=	(Canada) Werner Gudzus	BMW							10					1
52=	(United States) Jim Fitzgerald	Datsun 510								10		14		1
52=	(United States) Tex Guthrie	Lotus Cortina											10	1

Color	Result
Gold	Winner
Silver	2nd place
Bronze	3rd place
Green	4th & 5th place
Light Blue	6th–10th place
Dark Blue	Finished (Outside Top 10)
Purple	Did not finish
Black	Disqualified (DSQ)
White	Did not start (DNS)
Blank	Did not participate (DNP)
Blank	Not competing

=== Manufacturers' championships ===
Only the highest-finishing car scored points for the manufacturer. The points system was as follows:

1st	2nd	3rd	4th	5th	6th
9	6	4	3	2	1

==== Over 2.5L ====
Best 6 results count toward the championship.

Pos	Manufacturer	LRP	BRY	MOH	WGL	DON	ELK	SAN	Pts
1	American Motors	1	1	2	1	1	3	2	48 (52)
2	Ford	5	5	7	2	2	1	1	34
3	Pontiac	3	2	1		4	2		28
4	Chevrolet	2	3	3	4	5	4	3	24 (26)

==== Under 2.5L ====
Best 9 results count towards the championship.

Pos	Manufacturer	LRP	BRY	MOH	WGL	DON	ELK	SAN	ATL	POR	LAG	RIV	Pts
1	Datsun	1	1	1	1	3	1	4	1	1	1	1	81 (88)
2	Alfa Romeo	4	4	3	3	1	4	1	4	4	2	3	40 (51)
3	Toyota					5	3						6
4	Ford		3										4
5	Volkswagen			6		6		5					4
6	Volvo									5			2
7	BMW								6			6	2
8	Austin							6					1

== See also ==
- 1972 Can-Am season
