= Warren Tope =

American racing driver (1947–1975)

- Nationality: American
- Born: Harry Warren Tope; April 24, 1947 Michigan, United States
- Died: July 5, 1975 (aged 28) Pontiac, Michigan, United States
- Years active: 1970-1975
- Car number: 31, 70
- Crew chief: Donald Tope
- Wins: 1972 Trans-Am Road America (Elkhart Lake); 1972 Trans-Am Sanair (Quebec); 1974 Wide Track Grand Prix (Pontiac); 1970 SCCA National (Indianapolis)

Awards
- 1974 SCCA National Champion (A/Sports Racing)

Warren Tope (April 24, 1947 – July 5, 1975) was an American racing driver active in the early 1970s. He competed primarily in Sports Car Club of America (SCCA) road racing, including the Trans-Am Series, initially driving Ford Mustangs and later a De Tomaso Pantera. Tope won two events in the 1972 Trans-Am Series at Road America and Sanair, and won SCCA national championships at the Runoffs in 1971 and 1974. In 1975, he made two starts in the NASCAR Winston Cup Series, including the Daytona 500. He died later that year during the second annual "Pontiac Wide Track Grand Prix," having won the inaugural race there in 1974.

== Background ==
Harry Warren Tope (commonly known as Warren Tope) was born on April 24, 1947, in Troy, Michigan. He developed an interest in motor racing at a young age and grew up in the orbit of the American automotive industry. He was the son of Donald R. Tope, a Ford Motor Company vice president who has been identified in different sources as head of Ford’s Transmission and Chassis Division, and elsewhere as Director of the Ford Experimental Department in the United States (a title that may refer to, or be conflated with, the Fords Engineering Laboratory).

Tope graduated from Oakland University in 1968 and began racing in 1969. By 1970, he was competing in amateur Sports Car Club of America (SCCA) events; his father served as his pit (crew) chief and owned the team’s 1970 Mustang. Later accounts of Tope’s cars and racing have described him as a private entrant whose Ford ties primarily facilitated access to parts and technical expertise, rather than as a salaried factory driver.

== Racing career ==
=== Mustang Racing (1970-72) ===
In the late 1960s and early 1970s Warren Tope established his own team, Tope Racing Enterprises, to enter club and professional road racing events. Driving a Ford Mustang, he won the SCCA National Championship Runoffs in the A/Sedan class in 1971. He won the championship a second time in 1974 in a McLaren-Chevrolet sports racer.

In the 1972 Trans-Am season, Tope achieved his first professional race victory at Road America. The New York Times published a race report titled “Tope Triumphant in Trans-Am Race,” describing him as a 25-year-old systems analyst from Bloomfield Hills, Michigan, and noting that it was his first professional race win. Two weeks later, he followed that performance with another victory at Sanair Super Speedway on July 30, 1972. Throughout the 1972 season, Tope campaigned a Ford Boss 302 Mustang.

These victories came at a time when factory-backed teams had largely withdrawn from Trans-Am. A profile titled "Warren Tope's 1969 Boss 302 Trans Am" in Sports Car Digest describes this period of racing:

While the professional factory-backed racing teams run by Roger Penske, Bud Moore, and Holman-Moody dominated Trans-Am until the end of 1972, when America’s major manufacturers withdrew from high-profile racing involvement, skilled and committed privateers could still mount a serious challenge, finish well, and sometimes win in Trans-Am. Among them was Warren Tope, the popular and hard-charging SCCA A/Sedan and Trans-Am competitor from Troy, Michigan.

This was especially apparent when Tope, a first-year Trans-Am rookie, won two races ahead of George Follmer, a factory-backed contender who was widely favored to win in 1972.

=== De Tomaso Pantera Racing (1973-74) ===
Following Ford’s acquisition of Italian automaker De Tomaso, Tope expanded his program to include the De Tomaso Pantera. In late 1972 he acquired a factory-built Group 4 Pantera (chassis no. 2344), which had been sent to Ford in the United States for evaluation. Some provenance sources indicate it was used by the "Ford Experimental Laboratory" for testing, then subsequently sold to Tope. He repainted the Pantera in a distinctive red, white, and blue livery that matched his Mustang and entered it in Trans‑Am competition in 1973.

The Pantera’s performance proved inconsistent. In 1973, Tope failed to finish Trans-Am races at Lime Rock and Watkins Glen due to mechanical failures, and he did not start scheduled races at Sanair and Road America. Some sources indicate Tope placed first at Blackhawk Farms in the Pantera in 1973.

In July 1974, he drove the Pantera to an overall victory at the inaugural "Pontiac Wide Track Grand Prix" an independent street-circuit event held in Pontiac, Michigan. Later that month he entered the Trans-Am round at Road America, but retired with engine failure.

=== McLaren Racing and NASCAR (1974-75) ===
During the period in which his Pantera was unreliable or uncompetitive, Tope continued to compete in his Mustang. For 1974 he also purchased a second‑hand McLaren M8E, a Chevrolet‑powered sports racer derived from the Can‑Am series. With this McLaren he won the 1974 SCCA National Championship in the relevant class.

In early 1975, at the age of 27, Tope briefly ventured into stock car racing. He entered two NASCAR Winston Cup races in a Ford Torino, including the 1975 Daytona 500. He qualified for the Daytona 500 but was involved in an early crash; in his second start, at the Atlanta 500, he finished 18th out of 36. After those outings he returned to sports car racing, preparing for the season with his Pantera and McLaren.

== Death ==
On July 5, 1975, Tope competed in the second annual "Pontiac Wide Track Grand Prix" street race in Pontiac, Michigan. The event was an unsanctioned race organized locally and run on city streets, featuring a range of production-based cars and sports racing prototypes. Tope returned as the defending champion of the 1974 Pontiac race, which he had won in his Pantera. In 1975 he drove his McLaren Can-Am car.

Tope set the fastest qualifying time and started from pole position. During the race, a mechanical failure occurred when a rear driveshaft broke and ruptured a brake line. With braking compromised, he crashed at high speed and sustained fatal injuries. He was 28 years old. Following the crash, race officials and the City of Pontiac canceled all future street races.

== Legacy ==
=== Appellate decision ===
Tope’s death was later discussed in Michigan appellate litigation concerning the pre-event release forms used for the race. The resulting decision has been cited in discussions of the enforceability of liability waivers in recreational and sporting contexts in Michigan.

=== Memorials and tributes ===
A local Michigan newspaper reported in September 1975 that Donald R. Tope established a memorial fund following his son’s death. Oakland University, Tope's alma mater, lists a "H. Warren Tope and Marjorie Bertrand Tope Scholarship Fund."

=== Custom cars and later provenance ===
Several cars associated with Warren Tope and Tope Racing Enterprises remain of interest to collectors and historic-racing participants, appearing in auction catalogues and in retrospective coverage of the Trans-Am era.

==== Boss 302 Mustangs ====
Tope’s Boss 302 Mustang has been discussed in retrospective coverage of Trans-Am-era racing, including Sports Car Digest and MotorSport profiles. The car continues to be driven at Historic Trans-Am events.

An RM Sotheby’s catalogue addendum (Spring 2019) documents that two unfinished “body-in-white” Mustang shells were delivered to Tope Racing in late 1972. The addendum states the shells were ordered via Tope’s father, Donald Tope (described there as a Ford vice president), for Warren Tope and fellow racer Ed Hinchliff. They were completed using factory parts and Kar Kraft blueprints, with assistance from former Kar Kraft chassis engineers.

===== Pantera GT4 2344 and “Tope Panteras” =====
Tope also became closely associated with De Tomaso Panteras in both competition and later enthusiast discourse. One documented example is the factory-built Group 4 Pantera chassis THPNMB02344 (“2344”), which is listed in a De Tomaso owner registry catalogue as "Ford Factory GT4 2344" with an image of Tope in his workshop.

A detailed history published by Supercar Nostalgia states that chassis 2344 was one of 14 Group 4 Panteras built, completed in March 1972, and dispatched to Ford in Dearborn for assessment and promotional use, including display at the 1972 New York Motor Show from November, before being sold to Tope. The same account reports that the car was later repainted in Tope’s familiar red, white, and blue livery, and that it continued through subsequent owners after Tope’s death.

Separately from the works Group 4 Pantera car, later writing describes a small number of heavily modified road-going Panteras built and sold by Tope as near-GT-style conversions. A 2023 Hagerty UK feature reports that Tope “remanufactured” at least four Panteras (and possibly five) using Ford performance powertrains. The same article identifies one survivor as remaining substantially “virtually untouched." Tope's extensive modifications led later enthusiasts and journalists to describe them as limited-run “Tope Panteras.”

=== In popular culture and scale models ===
Tope’s Trans-Am-era Mustang has been referenced in hobby products, including an AMT/ERTL 1/25 scale “1973 Ford Mustang Race Car (Warren Tope)” model kit listing.

A 1:32-scale slot-car model of a 1969 Ford Mustang Boss 302 in Stark Hickey Ford livery (product C2656) appeared in Scalextric’s 2005 catalogue (Edition 46).

== See also ==
- Trans-Am Series
- 1972 Trans-American Sedan Championship
- SCCA National Championship Runoffs
- De Tomaso Pantera
- List of driver deaths in motorsport
