= McLaren M20 =

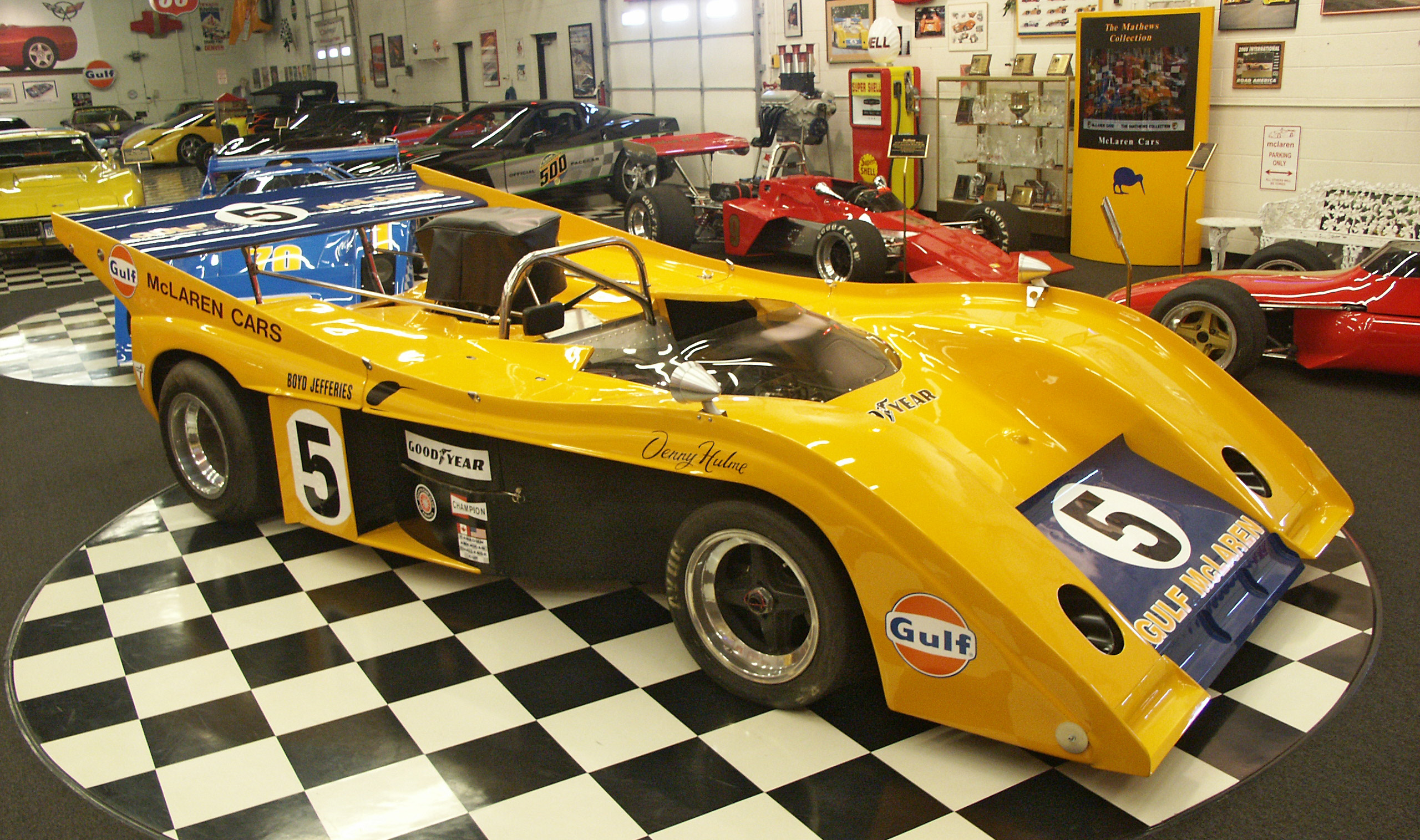
- Category: Group 7 sports prototype
- Constructor: McLaren
- Designers: Gordon Coppuck; Tyler Alexander

Technical specifications
- Chassis: Aluminium monocoque
- Suspension (front): Double wishbone
- Engine: Chevrolet 509 cu in (8,340 cc) V8. Naturally aspirated, mid-mounted.
- Transmission: Hewland LG Mk II 4-speed manual transmission
- Power: 787 hp (587 kW) @ 6,400 rpm 740 lb⋅ft (1,000 N⋅m)
- Weight: 690 kg (1,520 lb)
- Fuel: Gulf Oil
- Tyres: Goodyear

Competition history
- Notable entrants: (United Kingdom) Bruce McLaren Motor Racing (United States) Roy Woods Racing (United States) Commander Motor Homes (Germany) Felder Racing Team (United States) U.S. Racing
- Notable drivers: (New Zealand) Denny Hulme (United States) Peter Revson (United Kingdom) David Hobbs (Germany) Helmut Kelleners (United States) Mario Andretti (Canada) John Cannon (United States) Scooter Patrick
- Debut: 1972 Labatt's Blue Trophy
- Drivers' Championships: 0

The McLaren M20 was a sports prototype developed by McLaren for the 1972 season of the Canadian-American Challenge Cup. It served as a replacement for the team's M8Fs, but it later became the final Can-Am design created by McLaren before the team left the series after failing to secure the 1972 championship title. M20s continued to be entered by private teams until the Can-Am championship was canceled at the conclusion of the 1974 season. McLaren driver Denny Hulme won two races during the 1972 season while Scooter Patrick won a single event in 1974 with a privately entered M20.

== Development ==
When McLaren designed their replacement for 1971's M8Fs, one of the team's primary goals was to improve the cooling structure of the cars in order to allow their racing drivers, Denny Hulme and Peter Revson, more comfort during races. The M8F, as with previous McLaren sports cars, featured a large radiator mounted in the nose of the car, through which air was drawn from openings in the nose, and exited upwards over the open cockpit. McLaren designers Gordon Coppuck and Tyler Alexander devised a solution to this heat problem by using two radiators, one each mounted on either side of the cockpit, and drawing air from the side of the bodywork. This meant that hot air exiting the radiator no longer passed over the cockpit, and decreased fatigue on the drivers.

With a radiator no longer housed in the nose of the car, McLaren designs were free to redesign the nose for better aerodynamic efficiency. This resulted in the addition of an adjustable airfoil between the front wheel fenders which increased the downforce on the front end of the car, leading to increased grip while cornering. The new radiator design also required a redesign of the fuel tanks within the car. The new tanks for the M20 were compacted around the cockpit and designed to flow from the outward tanks into the central tank so that as fuel was burned off during the race, it would not affect the weight distribution of the car.

The engine of the M20 was once again a Chevrolet V8 engine, increased in displacement to 509 cubic inches (8,340 cc) and producing approximately 750 horsepower. Attached to the rear of the engine was a Lola-type spacer, to move the engine forward, with a Hewland Mk II gearbox attached behind the spacer. The fiberglass bodywork attached to the aluminium chassis was similar to the M8F, maintaining the "Coke bottle" design, but with the addition of ducting on the side to feed the radiators. Brakes were developed in conjunction with Lockheed. Improving on the recently developed cross-drilled brakes from the previous season, grooves were machined into the discs to prevent outgassing. Goodyear remained as the team's official tire supplier.

In total, three M20s were built by McLaren in 1972. Unlike previous McLarens, no customer variants were developed for private teams prior to McLaren leaving the Can-Am series, although all three cars were eventually sold to other teams.

== Racing history ==
Two new McLaren M20s made their debut at Mosport Park, the inaugural round of the 1972 season. The #5 entry of Denny Hulme was able to achieve victory after some tire difficulties, beating Porsche's brand new turbocharged 917/10. Further problems appeared at Road Atlanta, where aerodynamics led to Hulme's car becoming airborne and flipping while closely following one of the Porsches over the hump. Such a blowover accident, often associated with drag racing, also occurred on the same spot in 1998 to the Porsche 911 GT1 of Yannick Dalmas, and in 2000 to the BMW V12 LMR of Bill Auberlen.

Although Hulme's car was destroyed and had to be replaced by the third M20, Denny was quickly able to recover and earned his second victory of the season at Watkins Glen International, followed immediately by Revson in the other McLaren. Porsche earned their second victory in the next round at Mid-Ohio, aided by rain on race day.

After maintaining a close battle with Porsche in the first four races, McLaren saw the rest of the 1972 championship hopes slip away as numerous mechanical problems, mostly related to their Chevrolet motors, left them unable to finish several events. Hulme earned another second-place finish at Edmonton, his car reliability was no match for that of Penske-Porsche driver George Follmer. Both Team McLaren M20s retired at Road America, Donnybrook (Brainerd) and Laguna Seca. Hulme was able to secure second place over the troubled season, but earned only half the points total that Follmer amassed. Revson in the second half of the season, was only able to score a second at the series finale at Riverside. He was classified sixth in the standings. After failing to secure the Can-Am Championship for the first time since 1966, team owner Teddy Mayer decided to concentrate the company on Formula One and USAC IndyCars, leaving the Can-Am series behind.

After McLaren no longer had use for the M20s, all three (including Hulme's rebuilt car) were sold to separate teams. Roy Woods Racing purchased one car for driver David Hobbs to continue campaigning in Can-Am, while Fred Corbett (under the guise of Commander Motor Homes) purchased a car initially for Mario Andretti, who was later replaced by John Cannon. Corbett's M20 was modified to add a turbocharger in an attempt to better match Porsche's further improved car, the 917/30. The third M20 was sold to the German Felder Racing Team for driver Helmut Kelleners, who used it in the European Interserie championship.

Although none of the M20s were successful in 1973 when the improved Porsche 917/30 dominated, the cars would once again be victorious during 1974 under new rules partially caused by the oil crisis. Roy Woods' M20 was sold to Herb Caplan's U.S. Racing for the 1974 Can-Am season, with driver Scooter Patrick. Patrick won the final race of the season at Road America after the dominating Shadows suffered mechanical problems. The Can-Am series would be cancelled shortly thereafter. Meanwhile, Kelleners's M20 was able to win in an Interserie event at the Nürburgring en route to finishing second in the drivers championship.
