= Nick Dioguardi =

Italian racing driver

Nick Dioguardi (October 12, 1932 – May 11, 2015) was a racing driver born in Alia, Italy, based in Glendale, California. Throughout his career Dioguardi made a single IndyCar start in 1970.

== Racing career ==
Dioguardi first appeared on the national racing series at the 1965 SCCA National Championship Runoffs. At Daytona International Speedway, Dioguardi ran a Brabham in the Formula SCCA race. Dioguardi started 21st but failed to finish the race running in ninth place. The following year, at Riverside International Raceway, he finished in first place beating Phil Groggins. In 1969, Dioguardi, at the Riverside Grand Prix, his Lotus Formula C struck a photographer. The photographer survived the impact, suffering a broken leg.

As of 1968, Dioguardi also ran in Formula A. Both times, in 1968 and 1969, he failed to finish the race. Dioguardi first ran a World Racing Enterprises Shadow in 1968 and a Surtees TS5 the following year. In 1969 Dioguardi also entered the Continental 49'er at Sears Point Raceway. He finished in fifteenth place in the fourth round of the 1969 SCCA Continental Championship. In 1971, Dioguardi ran the complete season in the Surtees. Sponsored by Delta Tire, Dioguardi scored a single point. At the Mid-Ohio Grand Prix, he finished in tenth place.

Dioguardi made two appearances in IndyCar. In 1969, he was entered by Arciero Racing in an Eisert 64. The car built to Formula A specifications failed to qualify at Riverside. The following year, Dioguardi returned, at Phoenix International Raceway. He qualified 24th, and last. After 28 laps of the Phoenix 150, Dioguardi crashed.

Dioguradi later made appearances in Can-Am. In 1972, he ran at Laguna Seca and Riverside. He ran a Titanium Ti22. The car was revolutionary when it was introduced in 1969, but disappointed earlier at the hands of Jackie Oliver and David Hobbs. Dioguardi's best result was 13th at Riverside.

== Personal ==
Dioguardi was born October 12, 1932, in Alia, Sicily. Together with his parents and two brothers, the family moved to Los Angeles in 1949. In 1953 the family settled in Glendale, California, in 1953. The three brothers ran Dio Brothers Automotive. On May 11, 2015, Dioguardi died in his native Alia.

=== Car collection ===
Dioguardi was an avid car collector. The Dioguardi Collectioned was auctioned after he died. The March 86C, chassis number 86C-24, was raced by Josele Garza in the 1986 Indianapolis 500. The car was later raced by Chip Ganassi.

| Year built | Car | Class |
|---|---|---|
| 1967 | Alfa Romeo 1300 Junior | |
| 1969 | Fiat 500L Coupe | |
| 1969 | Fiat 500L Coupe | |
| 1974 | Alfa Romeo GTV 2000 Coupe U.S. Spec | |
| 1974 | Alfa Romeo GTV 2000 Coupe European Spec | |
| 1975 | Jensen Interceptor Convertible | |
| 1977 | Mercedes-Benz 450SL Convertible | |
| 1979 | Alfa Romeo Spider | |
| 1984 | Ralt RT5 | Formula Super Vee |
| 1986 | March 86C | IndyCar |
| 1988 | Dallara F388 | Formula 3 |

== Motorsports results ==
=== SCCA National Championship Runoffs ===
| Year | Track | Car | Engine | Class | Finish | Start | Status |
|---|---|---|---|---|---|---|---|
| 1965 | Daytona | Brabham | Ford | Formula C | 9 | 21 | Retired |
| 1966 | Riverside | Brabham | Ford | Formula C | 1 | 1 | Running |
| 1968 | Riverside | WRE-Shadow | Chevrolet | Formula A | 10 | | Retired |
| 1971 | Road Atlanta | Surtees TS5 | Chevrolet | Formula A | 7 | 8 | Retired |

=== American Open-Wheel racing results ===
(key) (Races in bold indicate pole position, races in italics indicate fastest race lap)

==== USAC National Championship ====
| Year | Team | Car | 1 | 2 | 3 | 4 | 5 | 6 | 7 | 8 | 9 | 10 | 11 | 12 | 13 | 14 | 15 | 16 | 17 | 18 | 19 | 20 | 21 | 22 | 23 | 24 | Rank | Points |
|---|---|---|---|---|---|---|---|---|---|---|---|---|---|---|---|---|---|---|---|---|---|---|---|---|---|---|---|---|
| 1969 | Arciero Racing | Eisert 64 | (United States); PHX1 | (United States); HAN | (United States); INDY | (United States); MIL | (United States); LAN | (United States); PIP | (United States); CDR | (United States); NAZ | (United States); TRE1 | (United States); IRP1 | (United States); IRP1 | (United States); MIL2 | (United States); SPR | (United States); DDIS | (United States); DQSF | (United States); ISF | (United States); BRN1 | (United States); BRN2 | (United States); TRE2 | (United States); SAC | (United States); KEN1 | (United States); KEN2 | (United States); PHX2 | (United States); RIV; DNQ | **N.C.** | - |
| 1970 | Arciero Racing | Eisert 64 | (United States); PHX1; 21 | (United States); SON | (United States); TRE1 | (United States); INDY | (United States); MIL1 | (United States); LAN | (United States); CDR | (United States); MIC | (United States); IRP | (United States); SPR | (United States); IRP1 | (United States); MIL2 | (United States); ONT | (United States); DQSF | (United States); ISF | (United States); SED | (United States); TRE2 | (United States); SAC | (United States); PHX2 | | | | | | **N.C.** | - |

==== SCCA Grand Prix Championship ====
| Year | Team | Car | 1 | 2 | 3 | 4 | 5 | 6 | 7 | 8 | 9 | 10 | 11 | 12 | 13 | Rank | Points |
|---|---|---|---|---|---|---|---|---|---|---|---|---|---|---|---|---|---|
| 1969 | | WRE-Shadow | (United States); RIV | (United States); LS | (United States); CDR | (United States); SON; 15 | (United States); ROA | (United States); LRP1 | (United States); BRA | (United States); LRP2 | (Canada); TRE | (United States); THO | (United States); SEB | | | – | 0 |
| 1970 | | WRE-Shadow | (United States); RIV | (Canada); EDM | (United States); SEA | (United States); LS | (United States); SON; DNS | (United States); DAL | (United States); ROA< | (Canada); TRE | (United States); BRA | (United States); LRP | (Canada); MOS | (United States); MOH | (United States); SEB | – | 0 |
| 1971 | Dioguardi Bros | Surtees TS5B | (United States); RIV; 24 | (Canada); LS; 26 | (United States); SEA; 19 | (United States); MOH; 10 | (United States); ROA; 16 | (Canada); EDM; 22 | (United States); BRA; 13 | (United States); LRP; 21 | | | | | | 28th | 1 |

=== Can-Am results ===
| Year | Team | Car | 1 | 2 | 3 | 4 | 5 | 6 | 7 | 8 | 9 | Rank | Points |
|---|---|---|---|---|---|---|---|---|---|---|---|---|---|
| 1972 | Dioguardi Bros | Titanium Ti22 | (Canada); MOS | (United States); ATL | (United States); WGI | (United States); MOH | (United States); ROA | (United States); DON | (Canada); EDM | (United States); LS; DNS | (United States); RIV; 13 | **N.C.** | - |
