= Peter Hoffmann (racecar driver) =

German racing driver (born 1939)

Peter Paul Hoffmann (born 1939 in Breslau) is a German racing driver known since the 1970s for competing with a McLaren M8F in European races like Interserie.

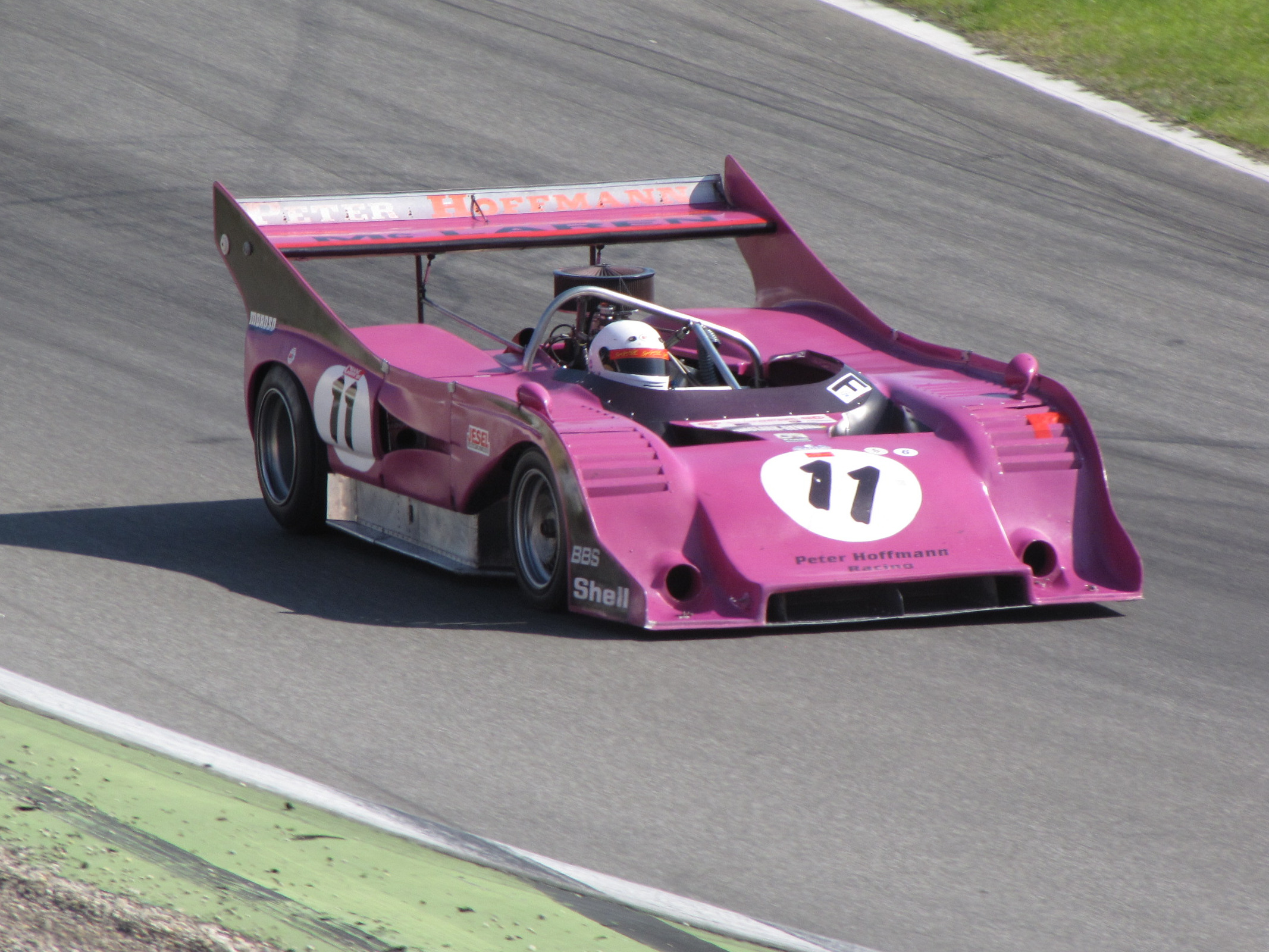
Hoffmann with his pink McLaren M8F in 2010

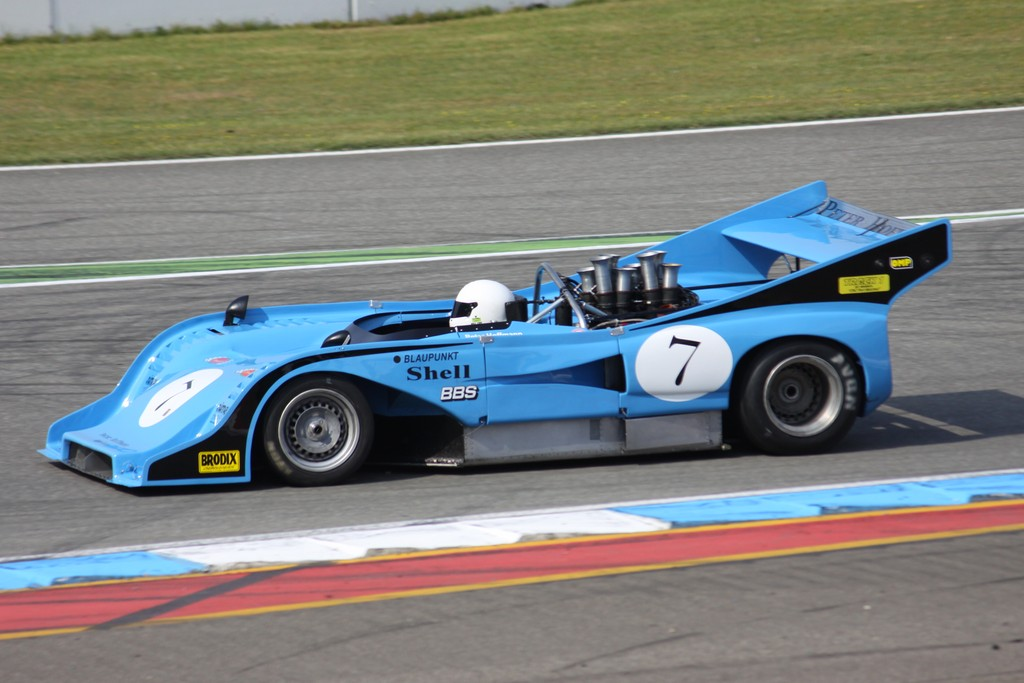
Hoffmann in 2014
