= Lola T310 =

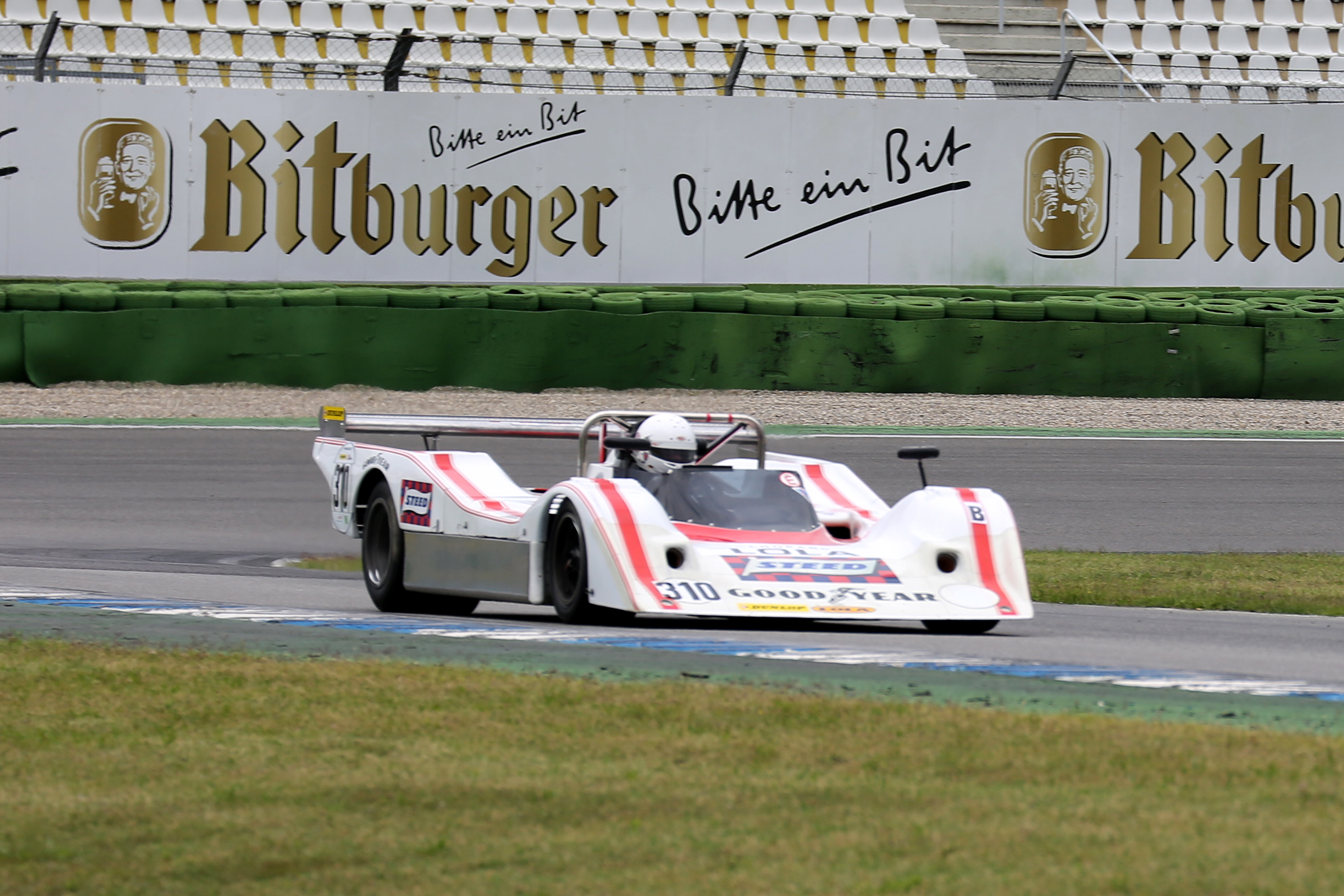
- Category: Group 7 Can-Am
- Constructor: Lola
- Designer(s): Eric Broadley

Technical specifications
- Chassis: fiberglass-reinforced body on aluminum monocoque
- Suspension (front): double wishbones, coil springs over shock absorbers, anti-roll bar
- Suspension (rear): reversed lower wishbones, top links, trailing arms, coil springs over shock absorbers
- Length: 180 in (457.2 cm)
- Width: 85.5 in (217.2 cm)
- Axle track: 66 in (167.6 cm) (front and rear)
- Wheelbase: 105.5 in (268.0 cm)
- Engine: Chevrolet 494 cu in (8,095 cc) V8 engine naturally-aspirated mid-engined
- Transmission: Hewland Mk.6 4-speed manual
- Power: 740 hp (550 kW)
- Weight: 705 kg (1,554.3 lb)

Competition history
- Debut: 1972 Can-Am Road Atlanta

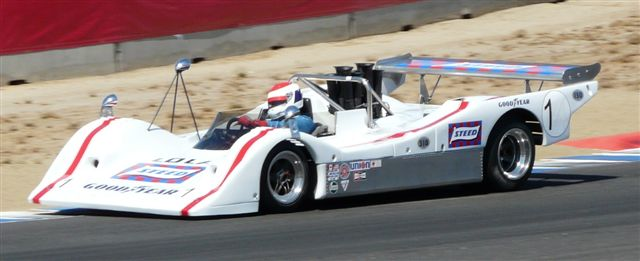
Lola T310, being driven by Bobby Rahal, at the Monterey Historic in 2008

The Lola T310 is a Group 7 sports prototype race car, designed, developed, and built by the British manufacturer and constructor Lola, to compete in the Can-Am championship from the 1972 season.
