= McLaren M8A =

Can-Am auto racing car

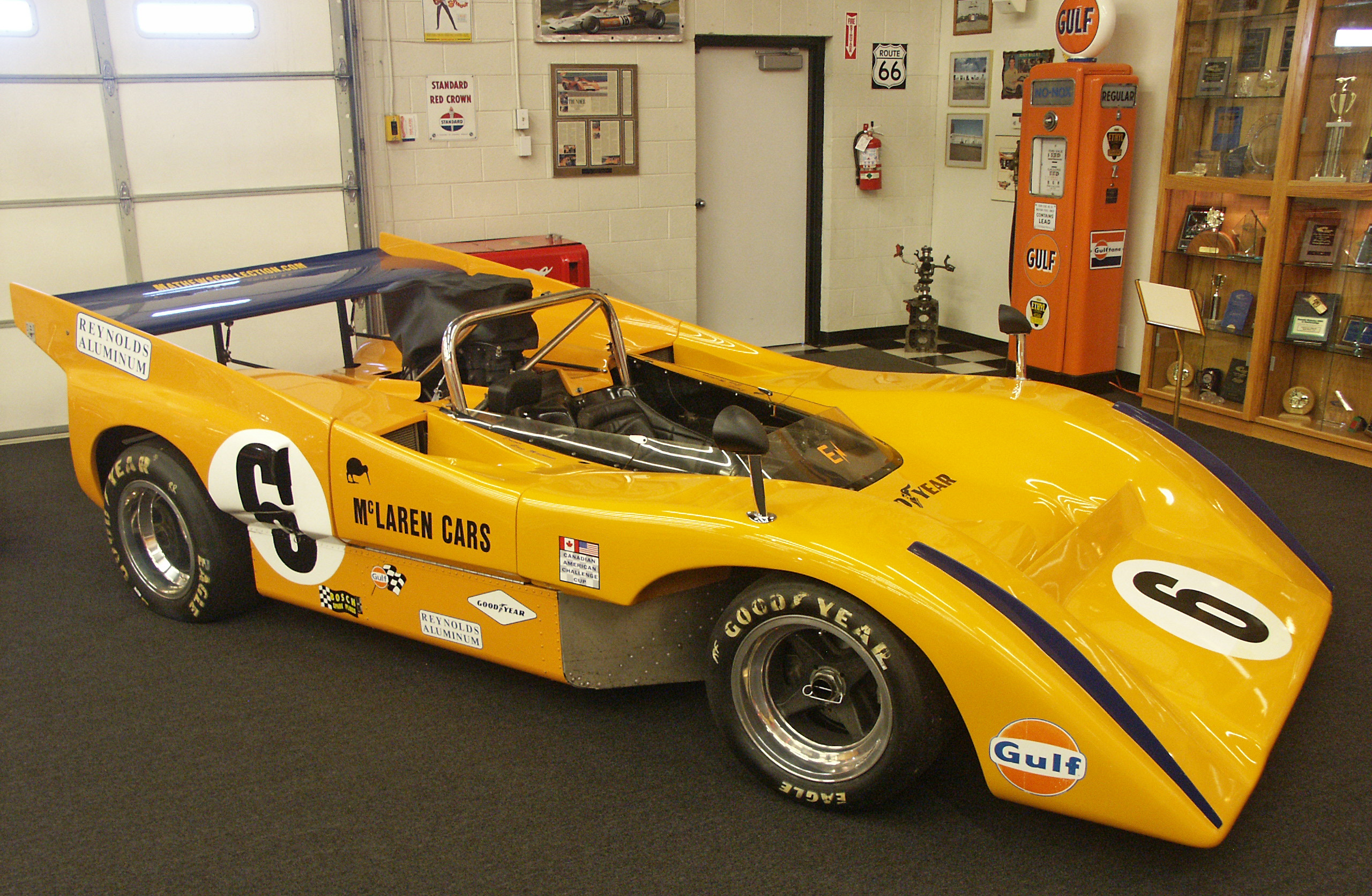
- McLaren M8D
- Category: Group 7 sports prototype
- Constructor: McLaren
- Designers: Gordon Coppuck; Jo Marquart

Technical specifications
- Chassis: Aluminium monocoque
- Suspension (front): Double wishbone
- Suspension (rear): Double wishbone
- Engine: Chevrolet 7 L (427 cu in) V8. Naturally aspirated, mid-mounted.
- Transmission: Hewland LG600 4-speed manual transmission

Competition history
- Notable entrants: (United Kingdom) Bruce McLaren Motor Racing
- Notable drivers: (New Zealand) Bruce McLaren (New Zealand) Denny Hulme
- Debut: 1968 Road America Can-Am

The McLaren M8 was a series of race car models developed by driver Bruce McLaren (1937 – 2 June 1970) and his Bruce McLaren Motor Racing team for their entry in 1968 Can-Am season. The M8A and its successors dominated Can-Am racing for four consecutive Can-Am seasons, until the arrival of the Porsche 917/10 turbo.

== M8A ==
The M8A was an evolution of the previous McLaren M6A, and featured an all-aluminium seven-litre Chevrolet big-block V8 as a semi-stressed chassis member. The engines were built by Gary Knutson and initially developed 590 bhp. Two complete M8A race cars and one spare tub were built.

=== M8C ===
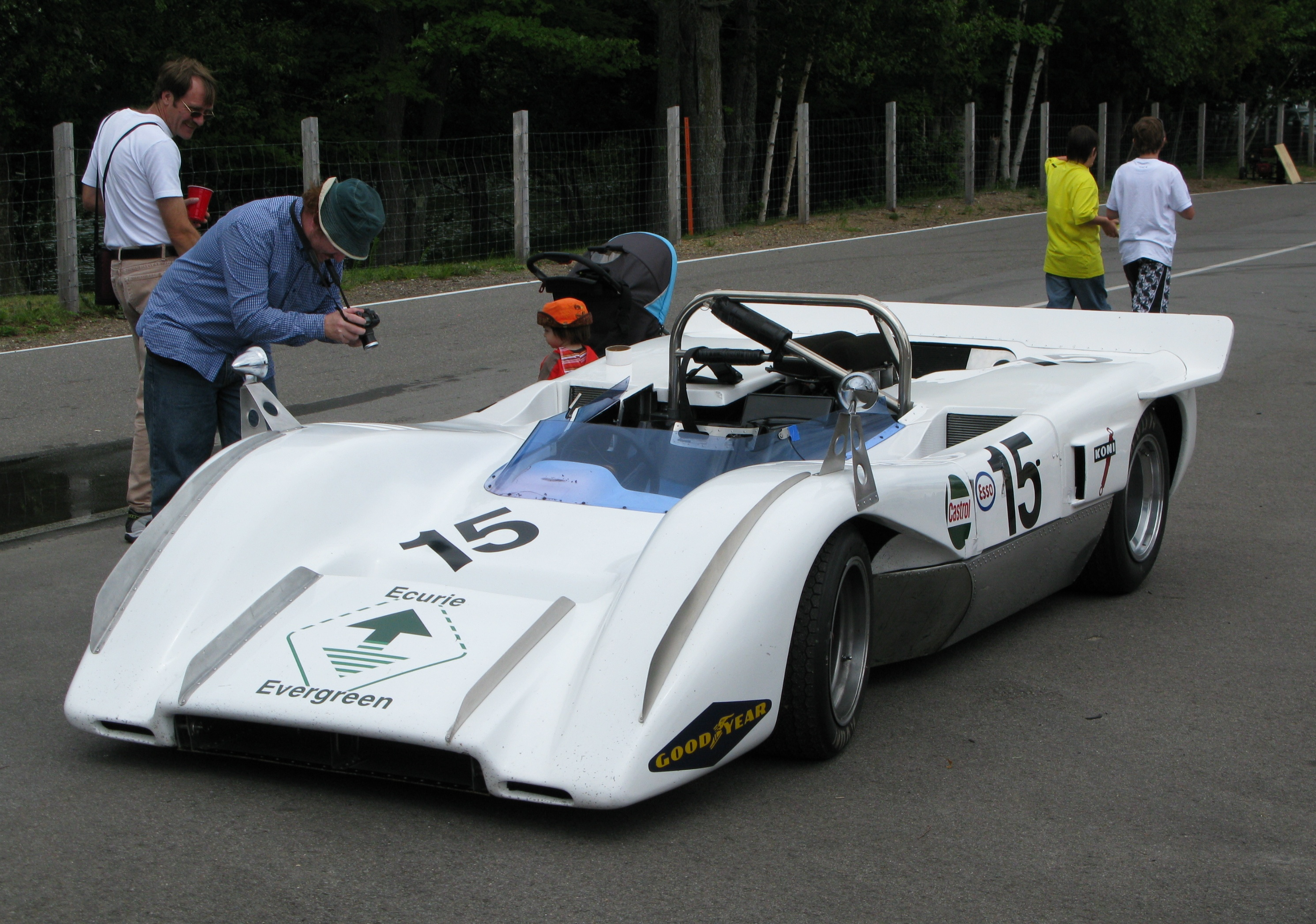
McLaren M8C.

The M8C was developed as a customer version of the M8A. Fifteen M8Cs were built, again by Trojan. They featured a more conventional chassis that did not use the engine as a stressed member, giving the customers more freedom in choosing an engine. The M8C was available with a variety of different engines, including Chevrolet big-blocks and small-blocks, the Ford big-block and small-block, and even a Ford-Cosworth DFV F1 engine.

== M8B ==
The M8B was developed for the 1969 Can-Am season. The most noticeable difference was that the rear wing was now mounted high on pylons, like the Chaparral 2E. The wing mounting pylons passed through the bodywork to attach directly to the suspension uprights. This arrangement allowed McLaren to run softer springs than would have been required had the massive rear wing been attached to the bodywork. The body was also widened in order to fit one-inch wider wheels, now 15 x 11 front and 15 x 16 rear. The 1969 engine was a shorter stroke, larger bore version of the 1968 engine. It was built by George Bolthoff and developed 630 bhp from 7,046 cc (430.0 cu in). Two complete M8B race cars and one spare tub were built using parts from the three M8As.

=== M8E ===
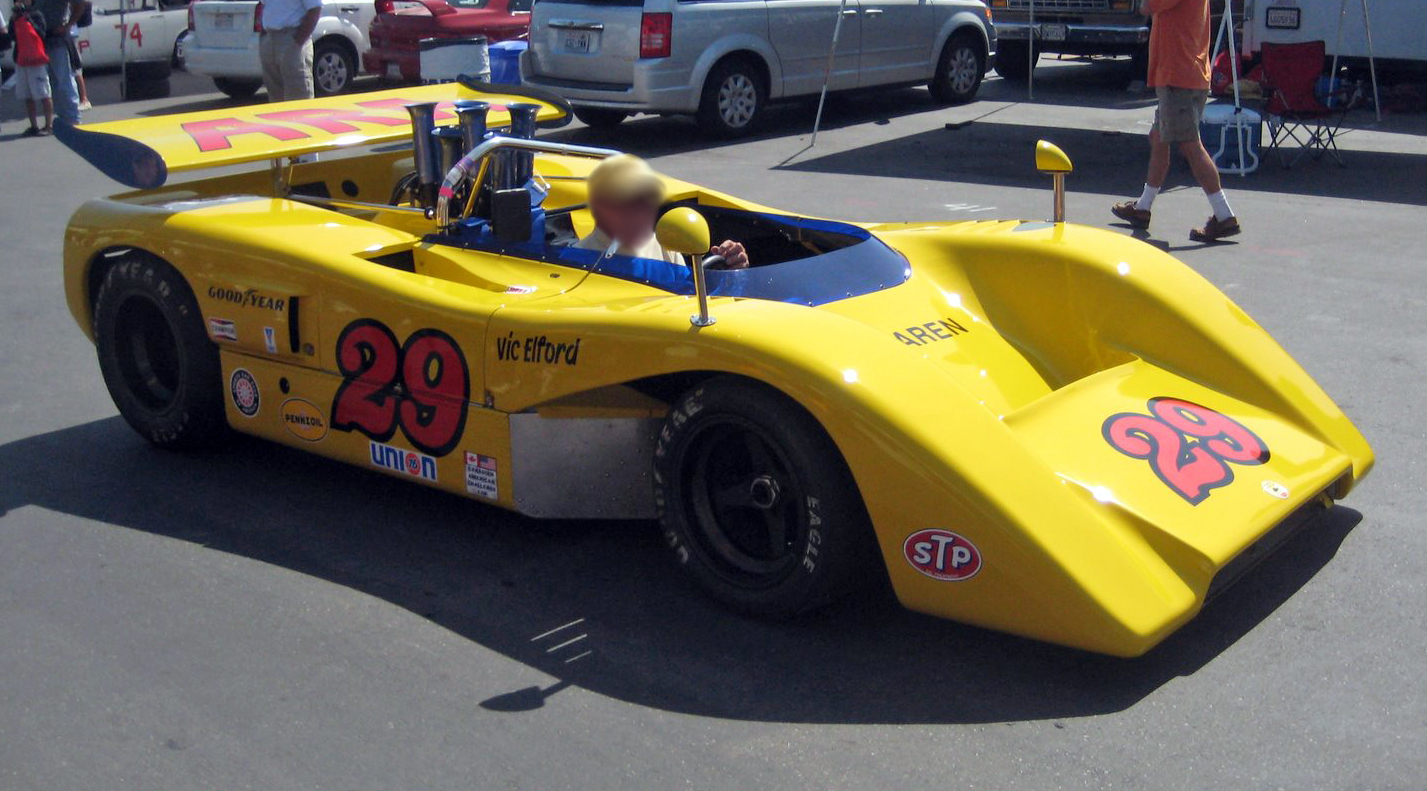
McLaren M8E

The M8E was a customer car based on the M8B and built by Trojan. The high pylon suspension mounted rear wings of the M8B were replaced with a lower fixed wing to comply with the ban on high-mounted wings.

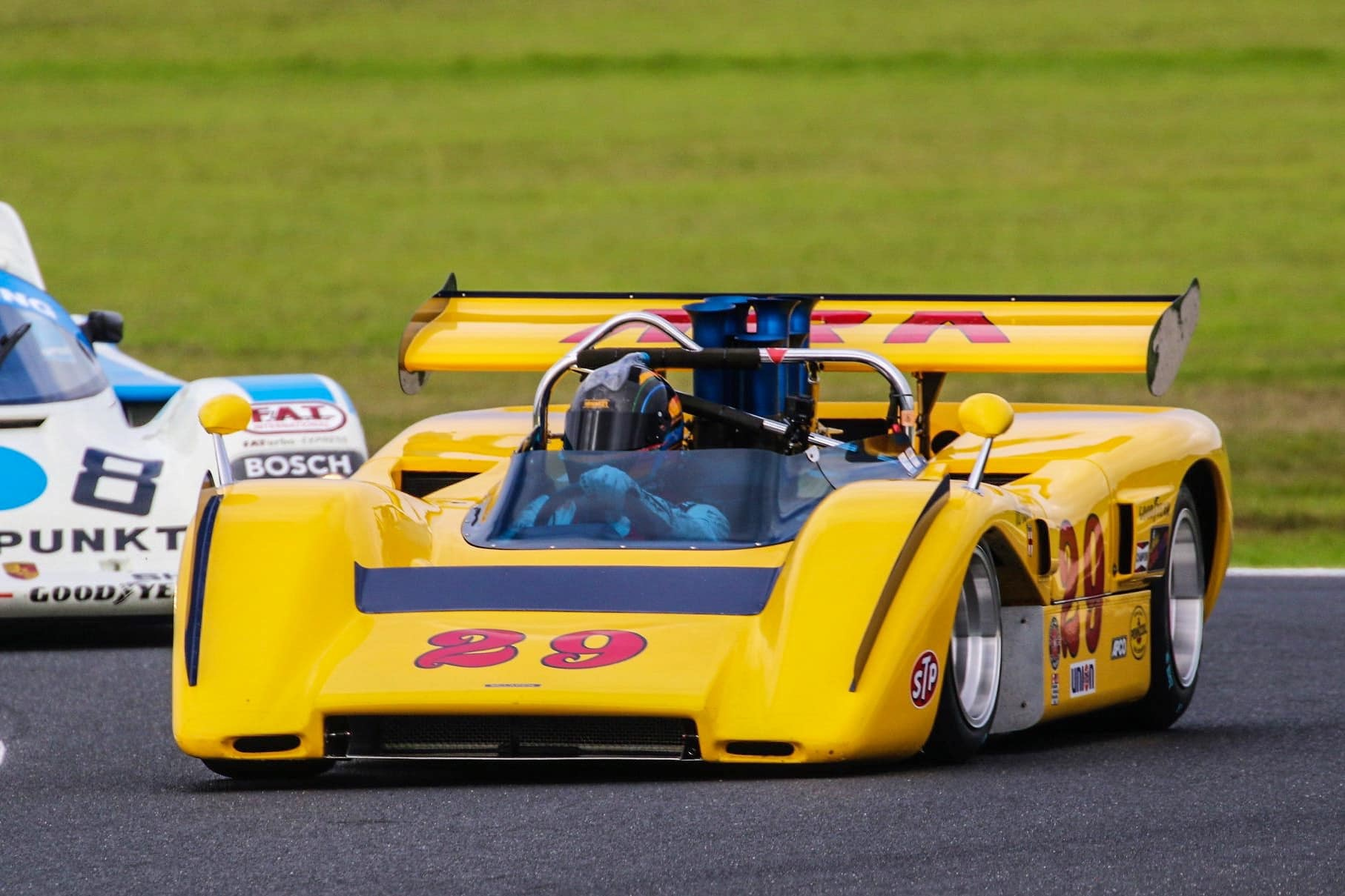
M8E-80-04 at 2020 Phillip Island Classic

== M8D ==
The M8D was developed for the 1970 Can-Am season. As in FIA-ruled racing (Formula One, World Sportscar Championship, ec.) in 1969, high, strut-mounted rear wings had been banned also by Can-Am, so the M8B wing was replaced by one mounted low on fins, earning the car the nickname "Batmobile". The Chevrolet V8 engine was again built by Bolthoff, who enlarged it to 7,620 cc (465 cu in). It now developed 670 bhp at 6800 rpm with 600 lb⋅ft (810 N⋅m) of torque.

Immediately prior to the car's launch, McLaren had endured a very difficult few weeks. Denny Hulme had suffered a serious crash at Indianapolis in May, and team founder Bruce McLaren was fatally injured in an accident whilst testing the M8D at the Goodwood Circuit on 2 June 1970. His car crashed on the Lavant Straight, just before Woodcote corner, after a section of the rear bodywork came adrift at speed.

The 1970 Can Am Championship season began on June 14, at the Mosport track. The McLaren M8D won nine out of the series' ten races. Dan Gurney won the first two races, after Bruce's fatal accident. Peter Gethin replaced Gurney at the fourth race, and won the Road America race. However, Denny Hulme won six races, and was series champion.

== M8F ==
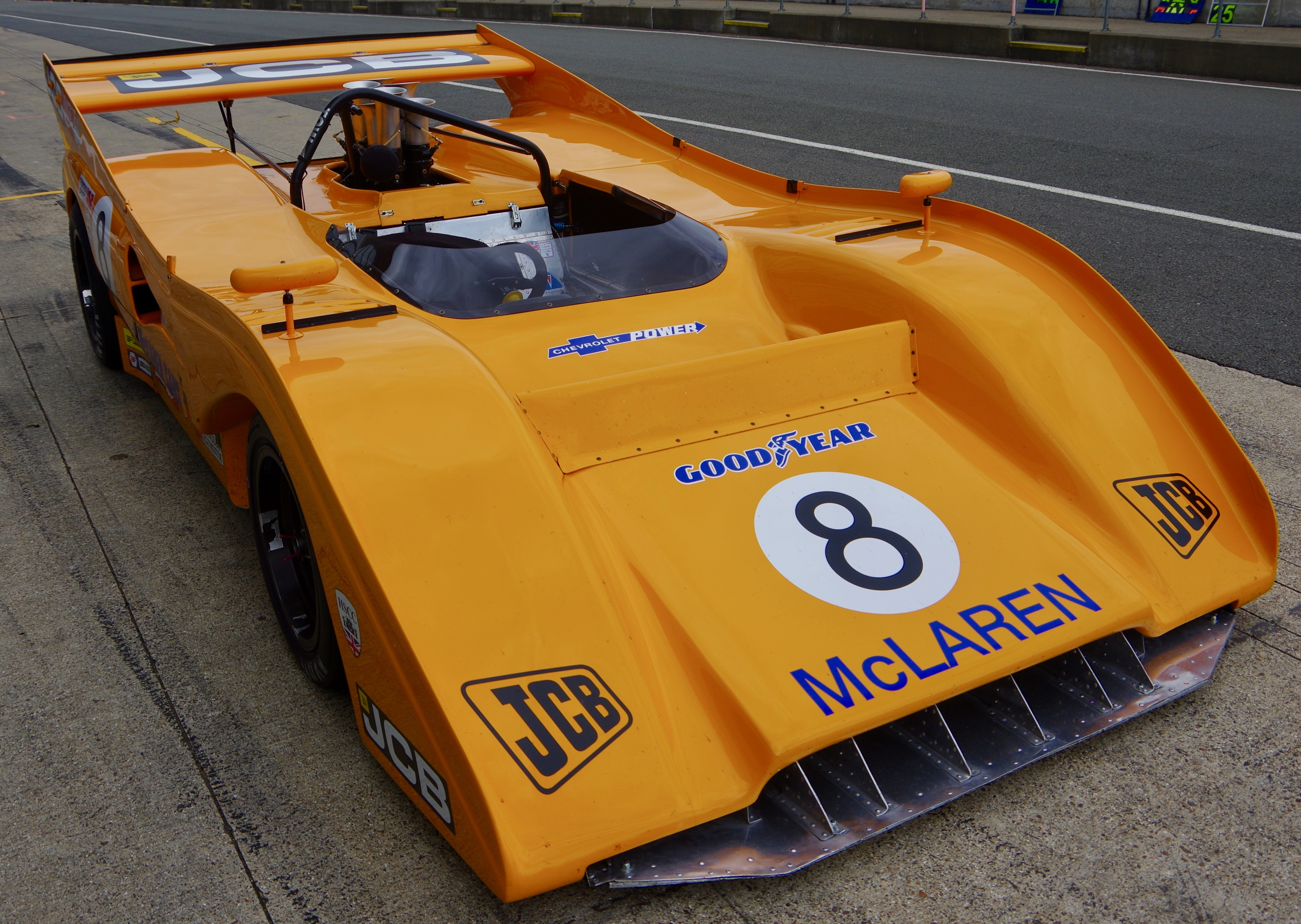
McLaren M8F

The M8F was developed for the 1971 Can-Am season and featured an 8.1-liter (488 CID) (and later upscaled 8.3-liter (509 CID)) big-block Chevrolet V8 engine. The engines outputs over 700 hp and 655 of torque.

=== M8FP ===
The M8FP was the Trojan-built customer version of the M8F.

== C8 ==
The McLaren C8 (sometimes referred to as the Chevrolet McLaren C) was a Group C racing car built on a M8F Trojan chassis. The C8 used a 496 cu in (8,128 cc) Chevrolet V8 engine. The car would have 825 PS (607 kW; 814 bhp) and 1,100 N⋅m (811 lb⋅ft) for qualifying, and 710 PS (522 kW; 700 bhp) and 935 N⋅m (690 lb⋅ft) for racing, this paired with its low weight of 1,200 lb (544 kg) would make the car fast, but fragile, and it often retired from races. Peter Hoffmann owned the sole C8, and ran it until 1999. The body was from Lotec. A second body had been used by Lotterschmidt propelled by a BMW M1/C engine on a M8E chassis, but it was destroyed. In 1982, Peter Hoffmann built this Group C in line with the new Group C regulations; he produced the C8 which used a 496 cu in (8,128 cc) Chevrolet V8 engine. He ran it for the first time in the eighth round of the Deutsche Rennsport Meisterschaft (DRM), held at Hockenheimring; however, he retired. Hoffmann's effort in the next round, held again at Hockenheim, was similarly unsuccessful, as he retired after 26 laps. He then switched to the Interserie, and entered the sixth round of that series, held at Siegerlandring; he took second, finishing 39.1 seconds behind Volkert Merl's Porsche 908/3 Turbo. He then returned to the DRM for the tenth round, held at the Nürburgring, but retired once more. In conjunction with the races that Hoffmann had completed in the M8F, he was classified in joint-16th in the Interserie driver's standings with 15 points, level with Klaus Niedzwiedz. In 1983, Hoffmann used the C8 from the start of the DRM season, and took eighth in the opening round, held at Zolder. However, he then retired from the next two rounds, held at Hockenheim and Mainz-Finthen, and was unable to start the Norisring round. An attempt to enter the second round of the Interserie, held at Most, was also unsuccessful, as he did not compete in the event. Hoffmann retained the C8 for 1984, but this year would be even more unsuccessful than 1983 had been. He retired from the first and third rounds of the Interserie, held at AVUS and the Nürburgring, and he missed several races altogether, before retiring in the Siegerland and the Nürburgring rounds. Having not used the C8 in 1985, Hoffmann entered it in the first round of the ADAC Sport Auto Supercup in 1986, held at the Nürburgring; but was the last of the finishers, in eleventh. He then retired at Hockenheim, Hoffmann would then switch back to the Holbert CAC-2 that he had used earlier in the season. Despite not having raced the McLaren C8 for six years, Hoffmann opted to run it in two rounds of the International Supersports Cup (ISC) in 1992, where he finished second at the Nürburgring, before struggling in the Silverstone round, being classified 36th. He entered three rounds of the series with the car in 1993, two rounds at the Nürburgring, and one at Paul Ricard; but he retired from all three. The C8 remained unused in 1994, and Hoffmann's attempt to run it at the Nürburgring round of the ISC in 1995 also ended in a retirement. Hoffmann entered five races of the ISC in 1996; he retired from the Monza, Spa and second Nürburgring rounds, failed to start the Donington Park round, but he took the car's first ever victory in the first Nürburgring round. Four failures to start followed in 1997, before Hoffmann took second at the Brno round. He would attempt to enter three races in 1998, and one in 1999, but didn't start any of the races, and the McLaren C8 never competed in a race again.

== Specifications ==
Variant	Year Introduced	Engine Type	Displacement	Horsepower	Horsepower RPM	Torque	Torque RPM	Weight	Length	Width	Height	Wheelbase	Citation
M8A	1968	Chevrolet big-block V8	6,997 cc (427.0 cu in)	590–625 hp (440–466 kW)	7,000	590–600 lb⋅ft (800–813 N⋅m)	5,500	658 kg (1,451 lb)	3,911 mm (154.0 in)	1,829 mm (72.0 in)	762 mm (30.0 in)	2,387 mm (94.0 in)	
M8B	1968	Chevrolet big-block V8	7,046 cc (430.0 cu in)	630–635 hp (470–474 kW)	7,000	575–600 lb⋅ft (780–813 N⋅m)	5,500	635–655 kg (1,400–1,444 lb)	3,911 mm (154.0 in)	1,829 mm (72.0 in)	762 mm (30.0 in)	2,387 mm (94.0 in)	
M8C	1969	Chevrolet big-block V8	6,997 cc (427.0 cu in)	650 hp (485 kW)	7,000	615 lb⋅ft (834 N⋅m)	5,500	646 kg (1,424 lb)	3,886 mm (153.0 in)	1,880 mm (74.0 in)	762 mm (30.0 in)	2,387 mm (94.0 in)	
M8C	1970	Cosworth DFV V8	2,993 cc (182.6 cu in)	420 hp (313 kW)	9,000	270 lb⋅ft (366 N⋅m)	7,000	590 kg (1,301 lb)	3,886 mm (153.0 in)	1,880 mm (74.0 in)	762 mm (30.0 in)	2,387 mm (94.0 in)	
M8D	1970	Chevrolet big-block V8	7,620 cc (465.0 cu in)	670–680 hp (500–507 kW)	6,800-7,000	600 lb⋅ft (813 N⋅m)	5,500	634 kg (1,398 lb)	4,166 mm (164.0 in)	1,930 mm (76.0 in)	1,143 mm (45.0 in)	2,387 mm (94.0 in)	
M8E	1971	Chevrolet big-block V8	8,095 cc (494.0 cu in)	740 hp (552 kW)	6,400	655 lb⋅ft (888 N⋅m)	5,500	650 kg (1,433 lb)	3,886 mm (153.0 in)	1,880 mm (74.0 in)	914 mm (36.0 in)	2,387 mm (94.0 in)	
M8F	1971	Chevrolet big-block V8	8,095 cc (494.0 cu in)	700–830 hp (522–619 kW)	6,400-6,600	655 lb⋅ft (888 N⋅m)	5,500	646 kg (1,424 lb)	3,886 mm (153.0 in)	1,880 mm (74.0 in)	762 mm (30.0 in)	2,387 mm (94.0 in)	
M8FP	1972	Chevrolet big-block V8	8,095 cc (494.0 cu in)	740 hp (552 kW)	6,400	655 lb⋅ft (888 N⋅m)	5,500	700 kg (1,543 lb)	4,110 mm (161.8 in)	1,981 mm (78.0 in)	914 mm (36.0 in)	2,387 mm (94.0 in)	
C8	1982	Chevrolet big-block V8	8,128 cc (496.0 cu in)	700–814 hp (522–607 kW)	No Data	690–811 lb⋅ft (936–1,100 N⋅m)	No Data	544 kg (1,199 lb)	No Data			2,387 mm (94.0 in)	

== Racing history ==
=== 1968 ===
Already known as "The Bruce and Denny Show" due to Bruce McLaren and Denny Hulme winning five of the six Can-Am races in the 1967 season, 1968 started off with an equally dominant performance by McLaren and Hulme in the new M8A at the Road America Can-Am race. Hulme won the race with McLaren second. The M8B faltered at the next race at Bridgehampton Race Circuit, where both cars retired due to engine failure. Following the double retirement, the team reduced the compression ratio of their engines to 12:1, from 13:1, trading horsepower for increased reliability.

McLaren roared back with another 1-2 finish in Edmonton, but then could only manage second and fifth in rainy conditions in California at Laguna Seca. It was beginning to look like the competition had caught up with McLaren.

The tide turned for the last two races, with the team's mechanics able to extract more power from their engine. Bruce McLaren won in the searing heat at Riverside and Denny Hulme won in Las Vegas. Hulme won the 1968 championship with 35 points, and McLaren finished second with 24 points.

=== 1969 ===
McLaren, as driver and team owner, won the 1969 Can-Am season.

=== 1970 ===
In England on 2 June 1970, twelve days before the CanAm season opened, Bruce McLaren crashed the M8D at Goodwood Circuit on the Lavant straight just before Woodcote corner. He had been testing his new M8D when the rear bodywork came adrift at speed. The loss of aerodynamic downforce destabilised the car, which spun, left the track, and hit a bunker used as a flag station. McLaren lost his life in the accident.

Despite the loss, the car type, driven by Dan Gurney, would go on to win the opening round of the 1970 Can-Am season championship.

=== 1971 ===
Peter Revson won the 1971 Can-Am season championship in a Team McLaren M8F winning 5 races. Denny Hulme won 3 races in the M8F. Two wins were scored by Jackie Stewart in the factory Lola Can Am car.

The latter half of the season saw, like in 1969, Porsche factory driver Jo Siffert, having completed the WSC season that included a joint weekend with Can-Am at Watkins Glen, campaigning a single Porsche 917 spyder, again supported by Porsche Audi USA dealers. The 1971 version, named 197/10, had new bodywork, and still the normally aspirated flat-12 that was built for endurance up to 24 hours racing, and underpowered for Can-Am sprints. Porsche already was testing it with turbocharging. Siffert finished 4th despite being killed in F1 before the last Can-Am round.

=== Post-1971 ===
Porsche, having won Le Mans in 1970 and 1971 and facing unfavourable new rules in the 1972 World Sportscar Championship, left the WSC in summer of 1971, to spend nearly a year testing on the factory-owned race track in Weissach in combination with Team Penske. They entered the 1972 Can-Am season with two of the now turbocharged Porsche 917/10 TC. Privateers had additional cars.

Facing a different kind of competition, the works McLaren team switched to the new McLaren M20 for 1972, which Hulme winning races 1 and 3, and suffering also a blowover accident. M8s continued to be raced by private entrants, and François Cevert won race 6 at Donnybrooke in an M8F entered by "Young American Racing". This would be the last win in Can-Am for the McLaren M8.

Driven by Mark Donohue, the new 917/10 TC set pole already in the first race and finished 2nd, showing speed and reliability. The second race was won by George Follmer while Porsche privateer Minter, with two good results, led the standings. Despite two more wins for McLaren, the latter half of the 1972 season was dominated by the turbocharged Porsche 917/10 of Follmer that combined superior power, well over 800 hp and soon over 1000, with sufficient drivability and reliability. While Hulme finished 2nd in the Championship, two other Porsche drivers nearly tied him, thus Porsche was clearly in the lead by now.

Team McLaren, with Hulme and Revson, decided to leave Can-Am after 1972, to focus on Formula One, winning the 1974 Formula One season, and again in 1976 and later.

The 1973 Can-Am season was even more lopsided for Porsche, winning all races, with nearly all races having three of them among the top four, and David Hobbs in a M20 or a Lola usually being the best non-Porsche. A number of M8 finished as backmarkers.

In Europe, mainly Germany, the M8 versions were raced in the Interserie that was started in 1970, and dominated by domestic Porsche 917 for several years, as much as McLaren and Chevy V8 had dominated Can-Am for years. One M8 chassis was purchased by then private tuner AMG, entered in 1972 at Imola with an AMG-tuned turbocharged Mercedes-Benz M100 engine. McLaren and Lola Can-Am cars remained popular for decades in classic events.
