= 1972 Can-Am season =

North American auto racing season

Seasons
- ← 1971 1973 →

The 1972 Canadian-American Challenge Cup was the seventh season of the Can-Am auto racing series. It was contested by FIA Group 7 racing cars running two-hour sprint events. The series began June 11, 1972, and ended October 29, 1972, after nine rounds. It was jointly sanctioned by the Sports Car Club of America and the Canadian Automobile Sports Club.

The series was won by George Follmer driving a Porsche 917/10 for Penske Racing.

== Schedule ==
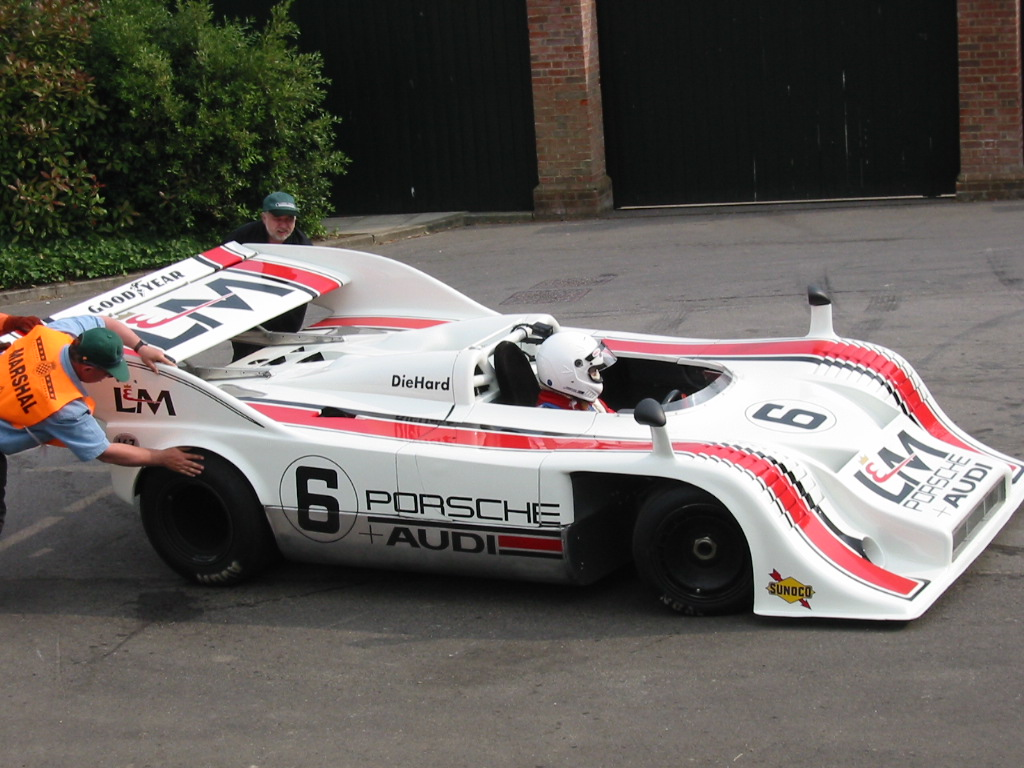
George Follmer won the series driving a Porsche 917/10 similar to the example pictured above

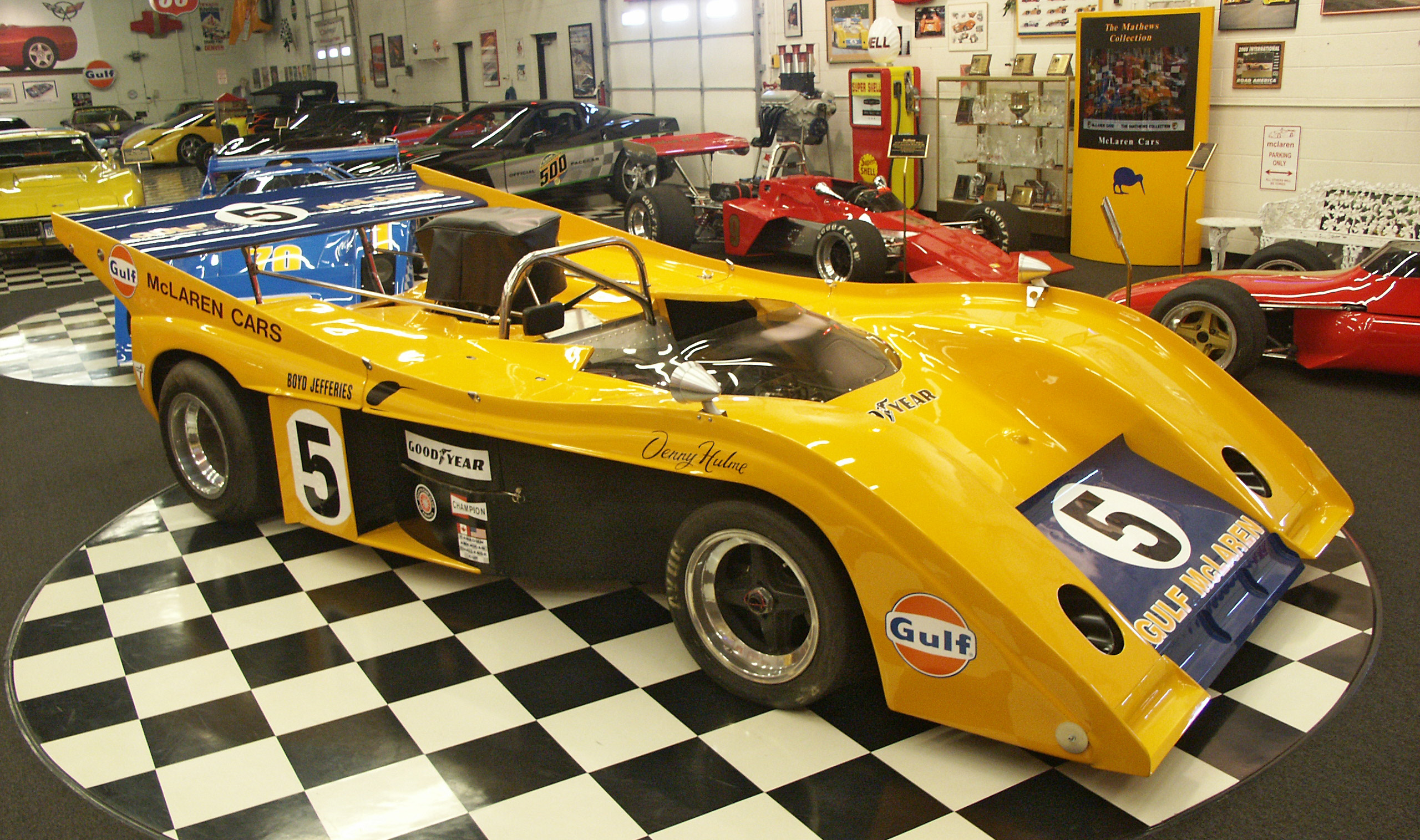
Denny Hulme placed second driving a McLaren M20

| Rnd | Race | Circuit | Date |
|---|---|---|---|
| 1 | Labatt's Blue Trophy | Mosport Park | June 11 |
| 2 | Road Atlanta Can-Am | Road Atlanta | July 9 |
| 3 | Watkins Glen Can-Am | Watkins Glen International | July 23 |
| 4 | Buckeye Can-Am | Mid-Ohio Sports Car Course | August 6 |
| 5 | Road America Can-Am | Road America | August 27 |
| 6 | Minneapolis Tribune Grand Prix | Donnybrooke International Raceway | September 17 |
| 7 | Klondike 200 | Edmonton Speedway Park | October 1 |
| 8 | Monterey Castrol GTX Grand Prix | Laguna Seca Raceway | October 15 |
| 9 | Los Angeles Times Grand Prix | Riverside International Raceway | October 29 |

== Entries ==
| Team | Chassis | Engine | Tire | Number | Drivers | Rounds |
|---|---|---|---|---|---|---|
| (United States) Vasek Polak Racing, Inc. | Porsche 917/10 | Porsche 5.4 L Flat-12; Porsche 5.0 L Turbo Flat-12 | G | 0 | (United States) Milt Minter | All |
| (United States) Vasek Polak Racing, Inc. | Porsche 917 PA | Porsche 4.5 L Turbo Flat-12 | G | 20 | (United States) Sam Posey | 8–9 |
| (United States) Vasek Polak Racing, Inc. | Porsche 908 | Porsche 3.0 L Flat-8 | G | 24 | (United States) Tony Adamowicz | 9 |
| (United States) Don Nichols | Shadow Mk. III | Chevrolet 8.1 L V8; Chevrolet 8.1 L Turbo V8 | G | 1/101 | (United Kingdom) Jackie Oliver | 1–4, 6–9 |
| (United States) Don Nichols | Shadow Mk. III | Chevrolet 8.1 L V8; Chevrolet 8.1 L Turbo V8 | G | 1/101 | (Brazil) Carlos Pace | 5 |
| (United States) Don Nichols | Shadow Mk. III | Chevrolet 8.1 L V8 | G | 102 | (United Kingdom) Jackie Oliver | 5, 8–9 |
| (United States) Don Nichols | Shadow Mk. III | Chevrolet 8.1 L V8 | G | 102 | (Brazil) Carlos Pace | 6–7 |
| (United States) Don Nichols | Shadow Mk. III | Chevrolet 8.1 L V8 | G | 102 | (United States) Bobby Allison | 8–9 |
| (United States) Carl A. Haas Racing Teams, Ltd. | Lola T310 | Chevrolet 8.1 L V8 | G | 1 | (United Kingdom) David Hobbs | 2–9 |
| (United States) Young American Racing | McLaren M8F | Chevrolet 8.3 L V8; Chevrolet 8.1 L V8 | G | 2 | (United States) Gregg Young | 1–7 |
| (United States) Young American Racing | McLaren M8F | Chevrolet 8.3 L V8; Chevrolet 8.1 L V8 | G | 22 | (France) François Cevert | 2–9 |
| (United Kingdom) McLaren Cars/Boyd Jefferies | McLaren M20 | Chevrolet 8.1 L V8 | G | 4 | (United States) Peter Revson | All |
| (United Kingdom) McLaren Cars/Boyd Jefferies | McLaren M20 | Chevrolet 8.1 L V8 | G | 5 | (New Zealand) Denny Hulme | All |
| (United States) Roger Penske Enterprises, Inc. | Porsche 917/10 | Porsche 5.0 L Turbo Flat-12 | G | 6 | (United States) Mark Donohue | 1, 6–9 |
| (United States) Roger Penske Enterprises, Inc. | Porsche 917/10 | Porsche 5.0 L Turbo Flat-12 | G | 6 | (United States) George Follmer | 2–5 |
| (United States) Roger Penske Enterprises, Inc. | Porsche 917/10 | Porsche 5.0 L Turbo Flat-12 | G | 7 | (United States) George Follmer | 6–9 |
| (United States) US Racing-Herb Caplan | McLaren M8F | Chevrolet 8.1 L V8 | | 8 | (United States) Jerry Grant | 6 |
| (United States) US Racing-Herb Caplan | McLaren M8F | Chevrolet 8.1 L V8 | | 8 | (United States) Mike Hiss | 8–9 |
| (United States) William Overhauser Racing, Ltd. | Lola T163; McLaren M8E | Chevrolet 8.1 L V8 | G | 9 | (Canada) John Cordts | All |
| (United States) William Overhauser Racing, Ltd. | Lola T163 | Chevrolet 7.4 L V8 | G | 79/10 | (United States) Chuck Parsons | 2 |
| (United States) William Overhauser Racing, Ltd. | Lola T163 | Chevrolet 7.4 L V8 | G | 79/10 | (United States) Ron Grable | 8–9 |
| (United States) Motschenbacher Racing Enterprises | McLaren M8D | Chevrolet 8.1 L V8 | G | 11 | (Germany) Lothar Motschenbacher | 1–4, 6–9 |
| (United States) Motschenbacher Racing Enterprises | McLaren M8D | Chevrolet 8.1 L V8 | G | 11 | (United States) Brett Lunger | 5 |
| (United States) Motschenbacher Racing Enterprises | McLaren M8F | Chevrolet 8.1 L V8 | G | 12 | (Germany) Hans Wiedmar | 6–9 |
| (United States) Place Motor Supply | Lola T160 | Chevrolet 8.1 L V8 | G | 13 | (United States) James Place | 1, 5 |
| (United States) Modena Sport Cars | Ferrari 512 M/F | Ferrari 5.0 L V12 | G | 13 | (United Kingdom) Mike Parkes | 9 |
| (United States) William M. Wonder | McLaren M8C | Chevrolet 7.6 L V8 | | 15 | (United States) Bill Wonder | 1–2, 5 |
| (United States) Nagel Racing | Lola T222 | Chevrolet 7.6 L V8 | G | 17 | (United States) Bob Nagel | 1–6, 8–9 |
| (United States) William Cuddy | McLaren M8E | Chevrolet 8.1 L V8 | | 18/3 | (United States) Alan Johnson | 4 |
| (United States) William Cuddy | McLaren M8E | Chevrolet 8.1 L V8 | | 18/3 | (United States) Bill Cuddy | 8–9 |
| (Germany) Willi Kauhsen Racing Team | Porsche 917/10 | Porsche 4.5 L Turbo Flat-12 | G | 18 | (Germany) Willi Kauhsen | 8–9 |
| (United States) Gary Wilson Racing | McLaren M8E | Chevrolet 7.6 L V8; Chevrolet 8.3 L V8 | G | 19 | (United States) Gary Wilson | 4–9 |
| (United States) Grand Touring Cars, Inc. | Ferrari 512 S | Ferrari 5.0 L V12 | | 20 | (United States) Harley Cluxton | 5 |
| (United States) Rinzler Motoracing - Holiday Inns | Lola T222 | Chevrolet 8.1 L V8 | G | 23 | (United States) Charlie Kemp | All |
| (United States) Jerry Hodges | Hodges Mk. II | Chevrolet 7.2 L V8 | | 25 | (United States) Jerry Hodges | 2 |
| (United Kingdom) Alain de Cadenet | Duckhams LM | Ford Cosworth 3.0 L V8 | | 28 | (United Kingdom) Alain de Cadenet | 3 |
| (United States) Jerry Rosbach | McLaren M8E | Chevrolet 7.6 L V8 | | 28 | (United States) Jerry Rosbach | 6 |
| (United States) Midwest Racing | McLaren M12 | Chevrolet 7.1 L V8 | G | 30 | (United States) Frank Kahlich | 3–9 |
| (United States) Warren Agor Racing Enterprises, Inc. | McLaren M8B | Chevrolet 7.0 L V8 | G | 31 | (United States) Warren Agor | 3–5 |
| (United States) Warren Agor Racing Enterprises, Inc. | McLaren M8B | Chevrolet 7.0 L V8 | G | 31 | (United States) Kent Fellows | 6, 9 |
| (United States) Warren Agor Racing Enterprises, Inc. | McLaren M8B | Chevrolet 7.0 L V8 | G | 31 | (United States) Mark Waco | 8 |
| (United States) Warren Agor Racing Enterprises, Inc. | McLaren M8FP | Chevrolet 8.1 L V8 | G | 37 | (United States) Warren Agor | 6–8 |
| (United States) Warren Agor Racing Enterprises, Inc. | McLaren M8FP | Chevrolet 8.1 L V8 | G | 37 | (United States) Mark Waco | 9 |
| (United States) Otto Zipper Racing Team | Alfa Romeo T33/3; Alfa Romeo T33/4 | Alfa Romeo 3.0 L V8; Alfa Romeo 4.0 L V8 | G | 33 | (United States) Scooter Patrick | 2–4, 8–9 |
| (United States) Warren Burmester | McLaren M8C | Chevrolet 7.6 L V8 | G | 34 | (United States) George Drolsom | 2, 4–5 |
| (United States) Warren Burmester | McLaren M8C | Chevrolet 7.6 L V8 | G | 34 | (United States) Tom Dutton | 3, 6–9 |
| (United States) Commander Motor Homes Racing Team, Inc. | Lola T160 | Chevrolet 7.0 L V8 | | 35 | (United States) Danny Hopkins | 2, 5–6, 8–9 |
| (United States) F & H Racing | Lola T163 | Chevrolet 7.0 L V8 | | 36 | (United States) Chuck Frederick | 5 |
| (Canada) Videopack Toronto | Porsche 910 | Porsche 2.3 L Flat-8 | | 39 | (Canada) Rainer Brezinka | 1 |
| (United States) North American Racing Team | Ferrari 712 M | Ferrari 7.0 L V12 | G | 40 | (France) Jean-Pierre Jarier | 3, 5 |
| (United States) North American Racing Team | Ferrari 712 M | Ferrari 7.0 L V12 | G | 40 | (United States) Sam Posey | 3 |
| (United States) Jim Butcher Racing | Lola T165 | Chevrolet 7.0 L V8 | G | 41 | (United States) Jim Butcher | 1–2, 4–7 |
| (Germany) Reinhold Joest | Porsche 908/03 | Porsche 3.0 L Flat-8 | F | 42 | (Germany) Reinhold Joest | 3 |
| (United States) Jerry Hansen | Lola T260 | Chevrolet 8.1 L V8 | | 44 | (United States) Jerry Hansen | 6 |
| (United States) Blue Magic Corporation | McLaren M8E | Chevrolet 8.1 L V8 | G | 47 | (United States) Ed Felter | 5–6, 8–9 |
| (Canada) JNO Racing Enterprises, Ltd. | McLaren M8C/D | Chevrolet 7.0 L V8 | G | 50 | (Canada) Gordon Dewar | 1–2, 4–6 |
| (United States) Peter Sherman | McLaren M12 | Chevrolet 7.0 L V8 | | 51 | (United States) Peter Sherman | 5–6 |
| (Canada) Roger McCaig Racing | McLaren M8FP | Chevrolet 7.6 L V8 | G | 55 | (Canada) Roger McCaig | 1–5 |
| (Canada) Roger McCaig Racing | McLaren M8FP | Chevrolet 7.6 L V8 | G | 55 | (United States) Chuck Parsons | 8–9 |
| (United States) Monte's Motors | Lola T162 | Chevrolet 7.4 L V8 | | 57 | (United States) Monte Shelton | 8–9 |
| (United States) Brumos Porsche-Audi Corporation | Porsche 917/10 | Porsche 5.4 L Flat-12; Porsche 4.5 L Turbo Flat-12 | G | 59 | (United States) Peter Gregg | 1–6, 8–9 |
| (United States) Racing Specialties | Lola T260 | Chevrolet 8.1 L V8 | G | 61 | (United States) Tom Heyser | 2, 4–9 |
| (United States) Racing Specialties | Lola T260 | Chevrolet 8.1 L V8 | G | 61 | (Sweden) Reine Wisell | 3 |
| (United States) Peckham Engineering | McLaren M8C | Chevrolet 7.4 L V8 | | 64 | (United States) Bob Peckham | 8–9 |
| (United States) Nick Dioguardi | Autocoast Ti22 Mk. II | Chevrolet 7.6 L V8 | | 65 | (United States) Nick Dioguardi | 8–9 |
| (United Kingdom) A. G. Dean | Porsche 908/02 | Porsche 3.0 L Flat-8 | | 68 | (United Kingdom) Tony Dean | 3–4 |
| (Canada) Thomas P. Fox | McLaren M12 | Chevrolet 7.0 L V8 | | 72 | (Canada) Dave Morris | 7 |
| (United States) Bob Klempel | McLaren-Elva Mk. III | Chevrolet 7.4 L V8 | F | 77 | (United States) Bob Klempel | 1–2, 4–5 |
| (United States) Racing Associates, Inc. | Lola T163 | Chevrolet 7.0 L V8 | | 81 | (United States) Dick Durant | 1–2, 4–5 |
| (United States) Don Burns | Porsche 908/02K | Porsche 3.4 L Flat-8 | G | 82 | (United States) Dick Hayes | 9 |
| (Switzerland) Ecurie Bonnier | Lola T260 | Ford Cosworth 3.0 L V8 | G | 90 | (France) Gérard Larrousse | 3 |
| (United States) R. S. Racing Enterprises | McLaren M6B | Chevrolet 7.0 L V8 | | 91 | (United States) Dave Causey | 5–6 |
| (United States) The March Company | McLaren M8D | Chevrolet 8.2 L V8 | G | 96 | (United States) Steve Durst | 1–6, 8 |
| (United States) Don Devine | McLaren M12 | Chevrolet V8 | | 99 | (United States) Don Devine | 2 |
| (United States) O. T. Racing | McLaren M12 | Chevrolet V8 | | 99 | (United States) Orly Thornsjo | 6 |

== Season results ==
| Rnd | Circuit | Winning team | Results |
| Rnd | Circuit | Winning driver | Results |
|---|---|---|---|
| 1 | Mosport | (United Kingdom) #5 Bruce McLaren Motor Racing | Results |
| 1 | Mosport | (New Zealand) Denny Hulme | Results |
| 2 | Road Atlanta | (United States) #6 Penske Racing | Results |
| 2 | Road Atlanta | (United States) George Follmer | Results |
| 3 | Watkins Glen | (United Kingdom) #5 Bruce McLaren Motor Racing | Results |
| 3 | Watkins Glen | (New Zealand) Denny Hulme | Results |
| 4 | Mid-Ohio | (United States) #6 Penske Racing | Results |
| 4 | Mid-Ohio | (United States) George Follmer | Results |
| 5 | Road America | (United States) #6 Penske Racing | Results |
| 5 | Road America | (United States) George Follmer | Results |
| 6 | Donnybrooke | (United States) #22 Young American Racing | Results |
| 6 | Donnybrooke | (France) François Cevert | Results |
| 7 | Edmonton | (United States) #6 Penske Racing | Results |
| 7 | Edmonton | (United States) Mark Donohue | Results |
| 8 | Laguna Seca | (United States) #7 Penske Racing | Results |
| 8 | Laguna Seca | (United States) George Follmer | Results |
| 9 | Riverside | (United States) #7 Penske Racing | Results |
| 9 | Riverside | (United States) George Follmer | Results |

== Drivers Championship ==
Points are awarded to the top ten finishers in the order of 20-15-12-10-8-6-4-3-2-1. For classification, the four best results of the first five races and all four results of the last four races were retained.

| Pos | Driver | Team | Car | Engine | Rd 1 | Rd 2 | Rd 3 | Rd 4 | Rd 5 | Rd 6 | Rd 7 | Rd 8 | Rd 9 | Total |
|---|---|---|---|---|---|---|---|---|---|---|---|---|---|---|
| 1 | (United States) George Follmer | (United States) Penske Racing | Porsche 917/10 | Porsche | | 20 | 8 | 20 | 20 | 10 | 12 | 20 | 20 | 130 |
| 2 | (New Zealand) Denny Hulme | (United Kingdom) Bruce McLaren Motor Racing | McLaren M20 | Chevrolet | 20 | | 20 | 10 | | | 15 | | | 65 |
| 3 | (United States) Milt Minter | (United States) Vasek Polak Racing Team | Porsche 917/10 | Porsche | 10 | 12 | 6 | 12 | (4) | 15 | | 10 | | 65 |
| 4 | (United States) Mark Donohue | (United States) Penske Racing | Porsche 917/10 | Porsche | 15 | | | | | | 20 | 15 | 12 | 62 |
| 5 | (France) François Cevert | (United States) Young American Racing Team | McLaren M8F | Chevrolet | | | 12 | | 15 | 20 | | 12 | | 59 |
| 6 | (United States) Peter Revson | (United Kingdom) Bruce McLaren Motor Racing | McLaren M20 | Chevrolet | 12 | | 15 | | | | 6 | | 15 | 48 |
| 7 | (United Kingdom) David Hobbs | (United States) Carl Haas | Lola T310 | Chevrolet | | 4 | 10 | 6 | | | 8 | 3 | 8 | 39 |
| 8 | (United Kingdom) Jackie Oliver | (United States) Advanced Vehicle Systems | Shadow Mk.3 | Chevrolet | | | | 15 | | 12 | | | 10 | 37 |
| 9 | (United States) Peter Gregg | (United States) Peter Gregg | Porsche 917/10 | Porsche | 8 | 8 | | | 12 | | | | 6 | 34 |
| 10 | (United States) Charlie Kemp | (United States) Bobby Rinzler | Lola T222 | Chevrolet | 2 | 10 | | 8 | | | 1 | 6 | | 27 |
| 11 | (Germany) Lothar Motschenbacher | (United States) Motschenbacher Racing | McLaren M8D | Chevrolet | 6 | 6 | 4 | | | 6 | 4 | | | 26 |
| 12 | (United States) Gregg Young | (United States) Young American Racing Team | McLaren M8F | Chevrolet | | 15 | | | 8 | | | | | 23 |
| 13 | (France) Jean-Pierre Jarier | (United States) North American Racing Team | Ferrari 712M | Ferrari | | | 1 | | 10 | | | | | 11 |
| 14 | (United States) Bob Nagel | (United States) Bob Nagel | Lola T222 | Chevrolet | 1 | | 3 | 1 | 3 | 3 | | | | 11 |
| 15 | (Brazil) José Carlos Pace | (United States) Advanced Vehicle Systems | Shadow Mk.3 | Chevrolet | | | | | | | 10 | | | 10 |
| 16 | (United States) Gary Wilson | (United States) Gary Wilson | McLaren M8E | Chevrolet | | | | 3 | 6 | | | 1 | | 10 |
| 17= | (Canada) John Cordts | (United States) William Overhauser Racing | Lola T163; McLaren M8D | Chevrolet | | | | | | 8 | | | | 8 |
| 17= | (United States) Sam Posey | (United States) Vasek Polak Racing Team | Porsche 917PA | Porsche | | | | | | | | 8 | | 8 |
| 19 | (United States) Scooter Patrick | (United States) Otto Zipper Alfa Racing | Alfa Romeo T33/4 | Alfa Romeo | | 2 | | | | | | 4 | 2 | 8 |
| 20 | (Canada) Gordon Dewar | (Canada) JNO Racing | McLaren M8C | Chevrolet | 3 | | | 4 | | | | | | 7 |
| 21 | (United States) Tom Heyser | (United States) Albert Heyser | Lola T260 | Chevrolet | | | | | | 1 | 2 | 2 | | 5 |
| 22= | (United States) Steve Durst | (United States) Steve Durst | McLaren M8E/D | Chevrolet | 4 | | | | | | | | | 4 |
| 22= | (United States) Ed Felter | (United States) Ed Felter | McLaren M8E | Chevrolet | | | | | | 4 | | | | 4 |
| 22= | (United States) Mike Hiss | (United States) Mike Hiss | McLaren M8F | Chevrolet | | | | | | | | | 4 | 4 |
| 25 | (United States) Warren Agor | (United States) Warren Agor | McLaren M8B; McLaren M8F | Chevrolet | | | | 2 | 2 | | | | | 4 |
| 26= | (United States) Chuck Parsons | (United States) William Overhauser Racing (Canada) Robert McCaig | Lola T163; McLaren M8FP | Chevrolet | | 3 | | | | | | | | 3 |
| 26= | (Germany) Hans Wiedmer | (Germany) Wiedmer Racing Team | McLaren M8F | Chevrolet | | | | | | | 3 | | | 3 |
| 26= | (Germany) Willi Kauhsen | (Germany) Willi Kauhsen Racing Team | Porsche 917/10 | Porsche | | | | | | | | | 3 | 3 |
| 29= | (United Kingdom) Tony Dean | (United Kingdom) A.G. Dean Racing | Porsche 908/02 | Porsche | | | 2 | | | | | | | 2 |
| 29= | (United States) Pete Sherman | (United States) Pete Sherman | McLaren M12 | Chevrolet | | | | | | 2 | | | | 2 |
| 31 | (Canada) Roger McCaig | (Canada) Roger McCaig | McLaren M8FP | Chevrolet | | 1 | | | 1 | | | | | 2 |
| 32 | (United States) Bob Peckham | (United States) Peckham Racing | McLaren M8C | Chevrolet | | | | | | | | | 1 | 1 |
