= George Follmer =

American racing driver (born 1934)

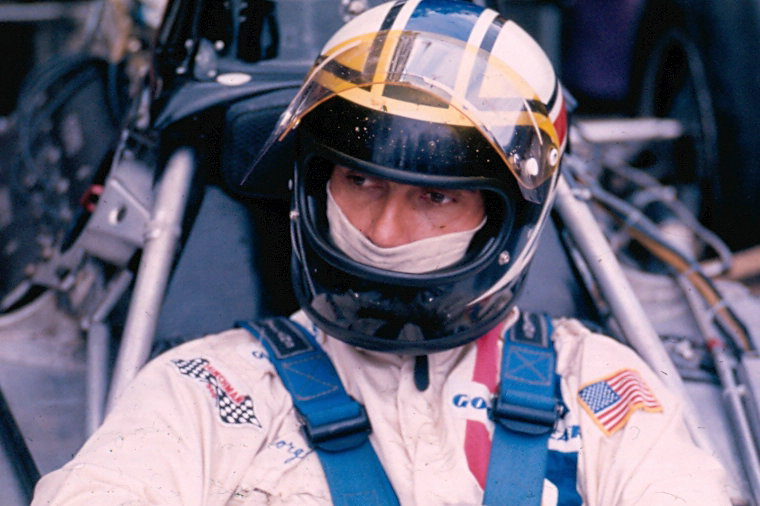
- Follmer at the 1973 German Grand Prix
- Born: George Richard Follmer; January 27, 1934 (age 92) Phoenix, Arizona, U.S.

Champ Car career
- 25 races run over 6 years
- Years active: 1967–1971, 1975
- Best finish: 16th – 1969
- First race: 1967 Indianapolis 150 (IRP)
- Last race: 1975 Ontario Heat 2 (Ontario)
- First win: 1969 Jimmy Bryan 150 (Phoenix)
Wins	Podiums	Poles
1	2	0

Formula One World Championship career
- Nationality: (United States) American
- Active years: 1973
- Team: Shadow
- Entries: 13 (12 starts)
- Championships: 0
- Wins: 0
- Podiums: 1
- Career points: 5
- Pole positions: 0
- Fastest laps: 0
- First entry: 1973 South African Grand Prix
- Last entry: 1973 United States Grand Prix

George Richard Follmer (born January 27, 1934) is an American former auto racing driver, and one of the most successful road racers of the 1970s. He was born in Phoenix, Arizona. His family moved to California when he was just an infant.

== Career ==
Follmer began his career running a Volkswagen Beetle in Gymkhana competition in parking lots in the San Gabriel Valley of Southern California.

Follmer raced in the USAC Championship Car series in the 1967-1971 and 1974 seasons, with 25 career starts, including the 1969-1971 Indianapolis 500 races. He finished in the top-ten 11 times, with his one victory in 1969 at Phoenix International Raceway. His best finish at the Indianapolis 500 was in 1971. He started 29th and finished in the fifteenth position driving the Grant King Racer's turbo Offy.

In 1973, Follmer competed in Formula One with Don Nichols' UOP Shadow team. He took part in his first Grand Prix, in South Africa, at the age of 39 years and one month - making him F1's oldest débutant since the 1950s, a distinction he still holds. In thirteen Championship races, his best results were sixth in South Africa and a podium in Spain, where he finished in third, in his first two Grands Prix, which gave him thirteenth in the Drivers' Championship with five points. He also competed in several non-Championship races.

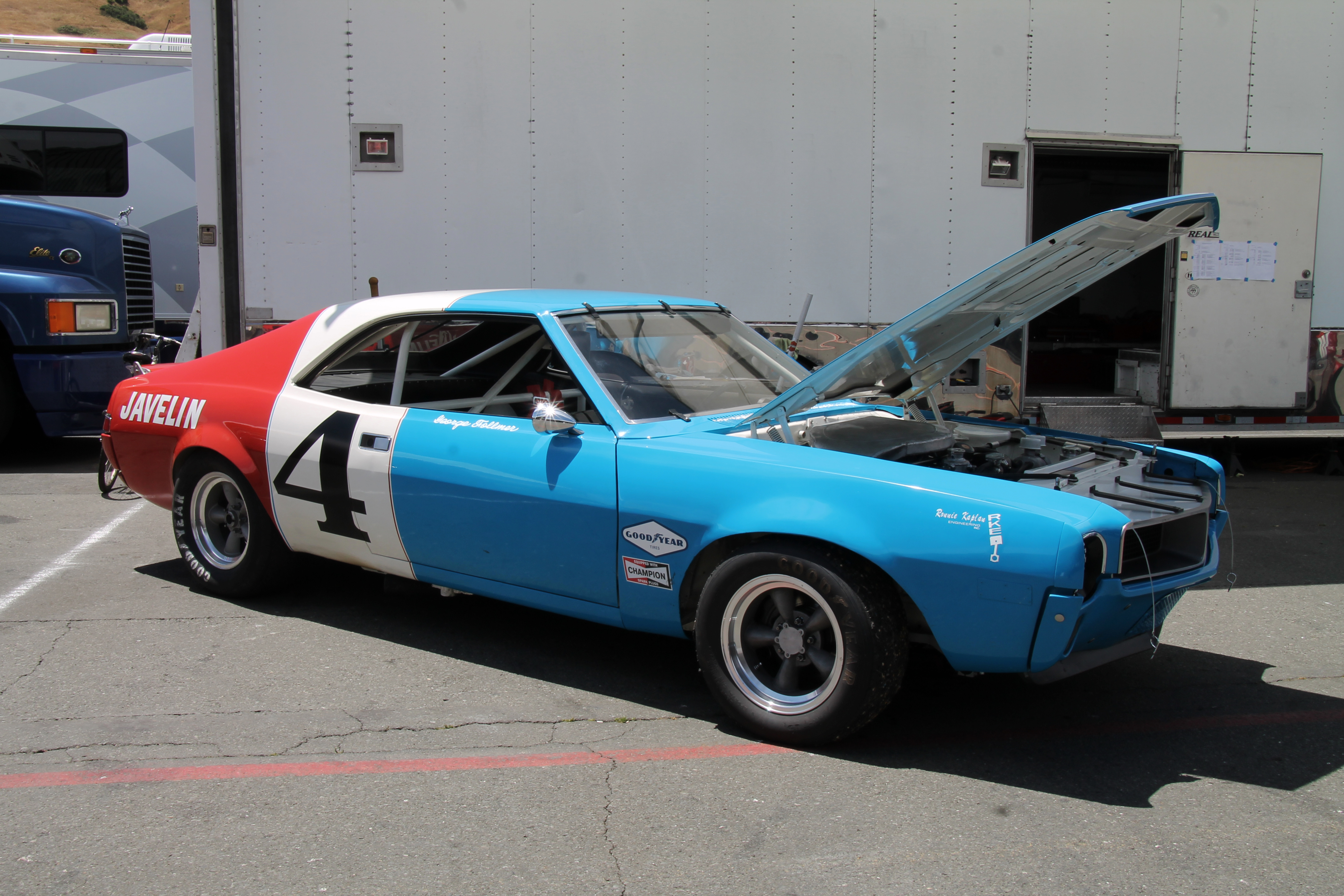
Follmer's 1968 AMC Javelin

Follmer also had success in other racing series. In 1965, he won the SCCA United States Road Racing Championship. Follmer won two races in the 1970 SCCA Continental Championship for Formula A cars, placing sixth in the standings. He won the Trans-Am championship in 1972, winning four races with an AMC Javelin, and 1976, driving a Porsche 934 Turbo.

In 1972, Follmer was the Can-Am champion, substituting for the injured Mark Donohue in Penske Racing's Porsche 917/10, causing the racing press to dub Follmer "George Am". He was vice-champion in 1973 driving for Rinzler and 1974 in a Shadow. He collected six wins and thirteen podiums in the three-year spell. He is the only driver to win the Can-Am and Trans-Am championship in the same year.

Follmer competed in the NASCAR Winston Cup series in 1974, with appearances in thirteen of 30 races. He collected three top-five finishes and a pole position. In 1974 and 1975, he raced at the International Race of Champions, where he won a race.

In 1977, Follmer returned to the revived Can-Am, resulting sixth in 1977 and fifth in 1978. He won the 1978 St. Jovite Can Am in his Prophet-Chevy over Alan Jones.

After his retirement, Follmer came back to racing for the 1986 24 Hours of Le Mans, obtaining a prestigious third place with a Porsche 956.

Though long-retired from professional motorsports competition, Follmer still competes in vintage races, often driving the very same cars in which he competed during his heyday.

In addition to his racing career, Follmer also owned a Porsche-Audi-Subaru dealership in Pomona, California, later relocated to Montclair, California, from 1977 to 1990.

== Awards ==
- He was inducted in the Motorsports Hall of Fame of America in 1999.
- He was inducted in the West Coast Stock Car Hall of Fame in 2019.
- He was also inducted into the SCCA Hall of Fame in 2019.
- He was inducted in the Trans-Am Series Hall of Fame in 2025.

== 2014 Saleen Mustang Limited Edition ==
2014 Saleen/Follmer Edition
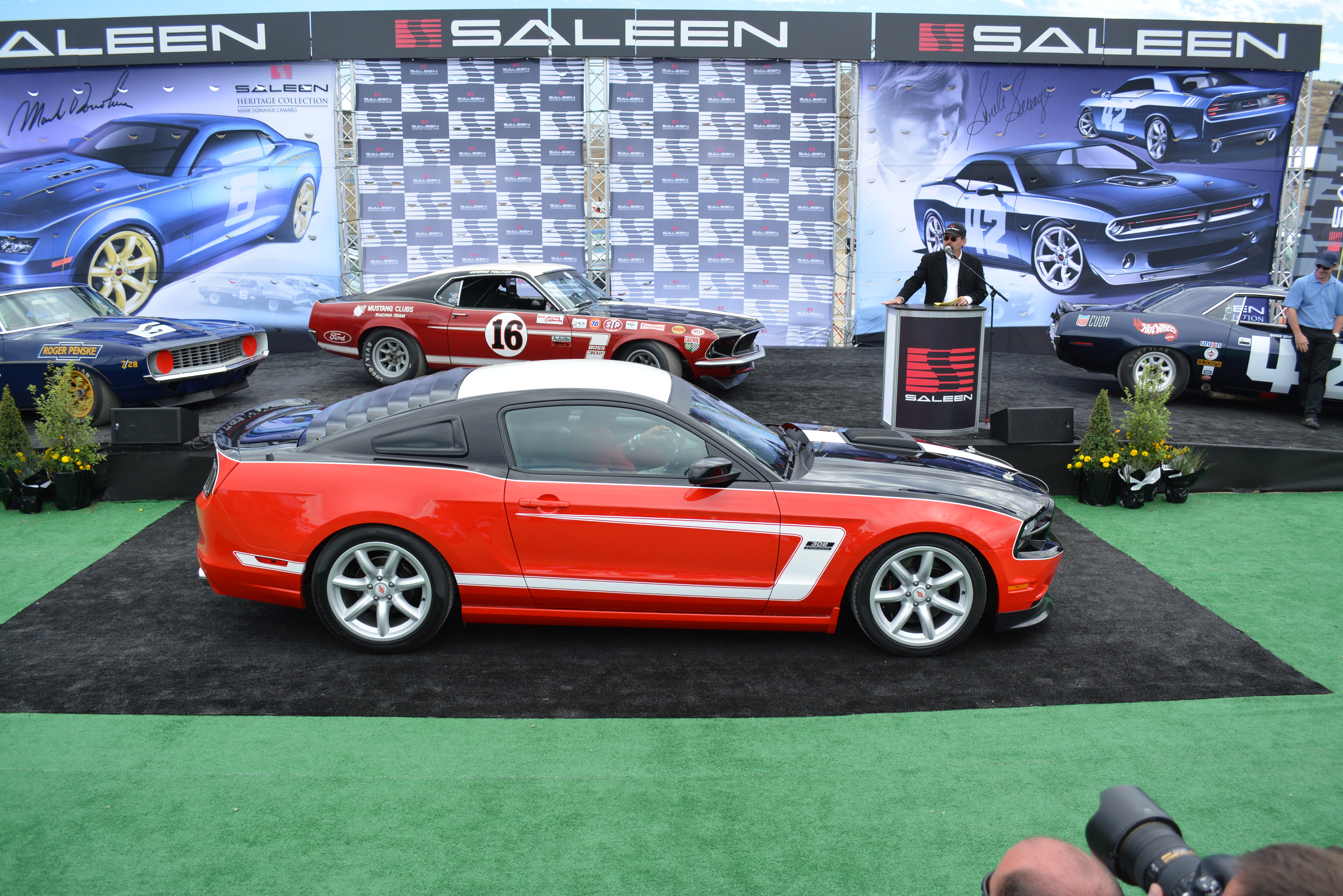

Overview
- Production: 2014
- Assembly: Saleen (Corona, California, USA)

Body and chassis
- Body style: 2-door 2+2 sports coupe
- Platform: 5th Generation Mustang

Powertrain
- Engine: Saleen 5.0L Hi-Revving 495HP V8
- Transmission: 6-speed manual

Dimensions
- Wheelbase: 107.1 in (2,720 mm)
- Length: 188.1 in (4,778 mm)
- Width: 73.9 in (1,877 mm)
- Height: 55.1 in (1,400 mm) (Coupe)
- Curb weight: 3,631 lb (1,647 kg)

On August 17, 2013, Saleen introduced a limited edition Saleen | George Follmer Edition Ford Mustang. Based on the #16 1969 Boss 302 Mustang racecar that he drove in the 1969 SCCA Trans-Am series, the 2014 Saleen/Follmer Edition was period correct with its livery, naturally aspirated 495HP 5.0L high revving engine, track tuned suspension, and 6-speed manual transmission. Production was limited to 250 units.

== Motorsports career results ==
=== Complete Canadian-American Challenge Cup results ===
(key) (Races in bold indicate pole position) (Races in italics indicate fastest lap)

Year	Team	Car	Engine	1	2	3	4	5	6	7	8	9	10	11	Pos	Pts
1966	John Mecom Racing	Lola T70 Mk.2	Ford V8	MTR; 5	BRI; Ret	MOS; DNS									10th	4
1966	John Mecom Racing	Lola T70 Mk.2	Chevrolet V8				LAG; 17	RIV; 5	LVG; Ret						10th	4
1967	Roger Penske Racing	Lola T70 Mk.3B	Chevrolet V8	ROA; 18	BRI; 3	MOS; 6	LAG; 3	RIV; 6	LVG; Ret						7th	10
1968	Agapiou Racing	Lola T70 Mk.3B	Ford V8	ROA	BRI	EDM	LAG; Ret	RIV; Ret	LVG; 2						7th	6
1969	Agapiou Racing	Ford G7A	Ford V8	MOS	MTR	WGL	EDM	MOH; DNS	ROA; Ret	BRI	MCH	LAG	RIV	TWS	NC	0
1970	Advanced Vehicle Systems	AVS Shadow Mk I	Chevrolet V8	MOS; Ret	MTR; Ret	WGL	EDM	MOH	ROA	ATL	BRA	LAG	RIV		NC	0
1971	Roy Woods Racing	McLaren M8D	Chevrolet V8	MOS	MTR	ATL	WGL	MOH	ROA	BRA	EDM	LAG	RIV; 9		31st	2
1972	Penske Racing	Porsche 917/10	Porsche Flat 12	MOS	ATL; 1	WGL; 5	**MOH**; 1	ROA; 1	BRA; 4	**EDM**; 3	LAG; 1	**RIV**; 1			1st	130
1973	Rinzler Motoracing	Porsche 917/10	Porsche Flat 12	MOS; Ret	ATL; 1	WGL; Ret	MOH; 2	ROA; 3	EDM; 2	LAG; Ret	RIV; Ret				2nd	62
1974	Phoenix Racing Organisations	Shadow DN4	Chevrolet V8	MOS; 2	**ATL**; 2	**WGL**; 2	MOH; Ret	**ROA**; Ret							2nd	45
1977	U.S Racing	Lola T332C	Chevrolet V8	MTR	LAG	WGL	ROA; Ret	MOH; Ret	MOS; 2	CTR	SON; Ret	RIV; 2			6th	35
1978	U.S Racing	Prophet 1	Chevrolet V8	ATL	CLT	MOH; 2	MTR; 1	WGL; Ret	ROA; 4	MOS; 5	CTR	LAG; DNS	RIV		5th	1088
1979	U.S Racing	Prophet 1	Chevrolet V8	ATL	CLT; DNS	MOS; 4	MOH; Ret	WGL	ROA	BRA	CTR	LAG	RIV		14th	3
1980	U.S Racing	Prophet 1	Chevrolet V8	SON	MOH	MOS	WGL	ROA	BRA	CTR	ATL	LAG	RIV; DNS		NC	0

=== 24 Hours of Le Mans results ===
Year	Team	Co-Drivers	Car	Class	Laps	Pos.	Class Pos.
1966	(United States) North American Racing Team	(United States) Charlie Kolb	Ferrari Dino 206S	P 2.0	9	DNF	DNF
1986	(Germany) Joest Racing	(United States) John Morton (United States) Kenper Miller	Porsche 956	C1	355	**3rd**	**3rd**

=== American open-wheel racing ===
(key) (Races in bold indicate pole position)

==== USAC Championship Car ====
USAC Championship Car results
Year	Team	Chassis	Engine	1	2	3	4	5	6	7	8	9	10	11	12	13	14	15	16	17	18	19	20	21	22	23	24	25	26	27	28	Pos.	Pts
1967	Rolla Vollstedt	Vollstedt	Ford	PHX	TRE	INDY	MIL	LAN	PPR	MOS	MOS	IRP; 17	LAN	MTR	MTR	SPR	MIL	DSF	INF	TRE; 21	SAC	HAN	PHX	RSD; 6								27th	230
1968	George R. Bryant	Cheetah	Ford	HAN; 11	LVS; 15	PHX; 24	TRE	INDY; DNQ	MIL	MOS; 11	MOS; 10	LAN	PPR	CDR	NAZ	IRP	IRP	LAN	LAN	MTR	MTR	ISF	MIL	DSF	INF	TRE	SAC	MCH	HAN	PHX	RSD; 8	32nd	206
1969	George Follmer	Cheetah	Chevy	PHX; 1	HAN; 9								IRP; 6	IRP; 3	MIL; 11	ISF	DOV	DSF	INF	BRN; 6	BRN; 6	TRE	SAC	SIR; 15	SIR; 6							16th	880
1969	George Follmer	Cheetah	Ford			INDY; 27	MIL	LAN	PPR	CDR	NAZ	TRE																				16th	880
1969	STP Racing	Lotus 56	Offy																							PHX; DNQ						16th	880
1969	STP Racing	Lotus 56	Plymouth																								RSD; 14					16th	880
1970	STP Racing	Brawner Hawk	Ford	PHX	SON	TRE	INDY; 31	MIL	LAN	CDR	MCH				ONT; 20	DSF	INF	SED	TRE	SAC	PHX											NC	0
1970	George Walther	Morris	Ford									IRP; 21	ISF	MIL																		NC	0
1971	Grant King	Kingfish 70	Offy 159 ci turbo	RAF	RAF	PHX	TRE	INDY; 15	MIL	POC	MCH	MIL	ONT	TRE	PHX																	NC	0
1975	American Kids Racer	Eagle 72	Offy 159 ci turbo	ONT	ONT; 8	ONT; DNS	PHX	TRE	INDY; DNQ																							NC	0
1975	Adams Automotive	Eagle 72	Offy 159 ci turbo						INDY; DNQ	MIL	POC	MCH	MIL	MCH	TRE	PHX																NC	0

==== Indianapolis 500 ====
Year	Chassis	Engine	Start	Finish	Team
1968	Cheetah	Ford	DNQ		George R. Bryant
1969	Cheetah	Ford	27	27	George Follmer
1970	Brawner Hawk	Ford	21	31	STP Racing
1971	Kingfish	Offenhauser	29	15	Grant King
1975	Eagle	Offenhauser	DNQ		American Kids Racer
1975	Eagle	Offenhauser	DNQ		Adams Automotive

=== NASCAR ===
(key) (Bold – Pole position awarded by qualifying time. Italics – Pole position earned by points standings or practice time. * – Most laps led.)

==== Winston Cup Series ====
NASCAR Winston Cup Series results
Year	Team	No.	Make	1	2	3	4	5	6	7	8	9	10	11	12	13	14	15	16	17	18	19	20	21	22	23	24	25	26	27	28	29	30	31	NWCC	Pts	Ref
1972	Frasson Racing	18W	Dodge	RSD	DAY	RCH	ONT; 49	CAR	ATL	BRI	DAR	NWS	MAR	TAL	CLT	DOV	MCH	RSD	TWS	DAY	BRI	TRN	ATL	TAL	MCH	NSV	DAR	RCH	DOV	MAR	NWS	CLT	CAR	TWS	120th	9	
1974	Bud Moore Engineering	15	Ford	RSD; 18	DAY; 20	RCH	CAR; 5	BRI; 28	ATL; 4	DAR; 22	NWS; 6	MAR; 22	TAL; 28	NSV; 6	DOV; 5	CLT																			29th	230.49	
1974	Penske Racing	16	AMC														**RSD**; 33	MCH	DAY	BRI	NSV	ATL	POC	TAL	MCH	DAR	RCH	DOV	NWS	MAR	CLT	CAR			29th	230.49	
1974	Donlavey Racing	90	Ford																														ONT; 32		29th	230.49	
1975	Moyer Racing	33	Chevy	RSD	DAY; 24	RCH	CAR	BRI	ATL	NWS	DAR	MAR	TAL	NSV	DOV	CLT																			74th	167	
1975	Michael Brockman	50	Chevy														RSD; 29	MCH	DAY	NSV	POC	TAL	MCH	DAR	DOV	NWS	MAR	CLT	RCH	CAR	BRI	ATL	ONT		74th	167	
1986	Midgley Racing	29	Chevy	DAY	RCH	CAR	ATL	BRI	DAR	NWS	MAR	TAL	DOV	CLT	RSD	POC	MCH	DAY	POC	TAL	GLN; 18	MCH	BRI	DAR	RCH	DOV	MAR	NWS	CLT	CAR	ATL	RSD; 36			76th	164	
1987	Midgley Racing	29	Chevy	DAY	CAR	RCH	ATL	DAR	NWS	BRI	MAR	TAL	CLT	DOV	POC	RSD; 40	MCH	DAY	POC	TAL	GLN	MCH	BRI	DAR	RCH	DOV	MAR	NWS	CLT	CAR	RSD; 16	ATL			70th	163	
1988	Midgley Racing	50W	Pontiac	DAY	RCH	CAR	ATL	DAR	BRI	NWS	MAR	TAL	CLT	DOV	RSD; DNQ	POC	MCH	DAY	POC	TAL	GLN	MCH	BRI	DAR	RCH	DOV	MAR	CLT	NWS	CAR	PHO	ATL			NA	-	

===== Daytona 500 =====
Year	Team	Manufacturer	Start	Finish
1974	Bud Moore Engineering	Ford	5	20
1975	Moyer Racing	Chevrolet	40	24

=== International Race of Champions ===
(key) (Bold – Pole position. * – Most laps led.)

International Race of Champions results
Year	Make	1	2	3	4	Pos.	Pts	Ref
1973–74	Porsche	RSD; 4	RSD; 1	RSD; 5	DAY; 5	5th	-	
1974–75	Chevy	MCH; 5	RSD; 2	RSD; 5	DAY; 8	7th	-	

=== Complete Formula One World Championship results ===
(key) (Races in bold indicate pole position; races in italics indicate fastest lap)

Year	Entrant	Chassis	Engine	1	2	3	4	5	6	7	8	9	10	11	12	13	14	15	WDC	Pts
1973	UOP Shadow Racing Team	Shadow DN1	Ford Cosworth DFV 3.0 V8	ARG	BRA	RSA; 6	ESP; 3	BEL; Ret	MON; DNS	SWE; 14	FRA; Ret	GBR; Ret	NED; 10	GER; Ret	AUT; Ret	ITA; 10	CAN; 17	USA; 14	13th	5

=== Non-Championship Formula One results ===
(key) (races in bold indicate pole position; races in italics indicate fastest lap) (Races in italics indicate fastest lap)

Year	Entrant	Chassis	Engine	1	2	3	4	5	6	7	8
1971	Brian O'Neil Racing	Lotus 70B	Chevrolet 5.0 V8	ARG	ROC	QUE; 30	SPR	INT	RIN	OUL	VIC
1973	UOP Shadow Racing Team	Shadow DN1	Ford Cosworth DFV 3.0 V8	ROC	INT; 6						

Sporting positions
Preceded by Peter Revson	Can-Am; Champion; 1972	Succeeded by Mark Donohue
