= 1970 Road Atlanta Can-Am =

Motor race

Layout of the Road Atlanta (1970-1997)

The 1970 Road Atlanta Can-Am race was the seventh round of the 1970 Can-Am season. It was held September 13, 1970, at Road Atlanta in Braselton, Georgia. The race of attrition was won, surprisingly, by Tony Dean in an underpowered 3-litre Porsche 908/02.

== Results ==
- Pole position: Vic Elford, 1:17.420 (117.216 mph (188.641 km/h))
- Fastest lap: Peter Gethin (lap 7) & Peter Revson (lap 26), 1:18.05 (116.27 mph (187.12 km/h))
- Race distance: 189.06 miles (304.26 km)
- Winner's average speed: 103.472 miles per hour (166.522 km/h)

Pos	No	Driver	Car	Team	Laps	Time/Retired	Grid	Points
1	8	(United Kingdom) Tony Dean	Porsche 908/02	(United Kingdom) A.G. Dean, Ltd.	75	1:49:45.880	10	20
2	51	(United States) Dave Causey	Lola T163-Chevrolet	(United States) Dave Causey	75	1:50:57.880	12	15
3	11	(United States) Lothar Motschenbacher	McLaren M12-Chevrolet	(United States) Motschenbacher Racing	72	-3 laps	9	12
4	54	(United States) Oscar Koveleski	McLaren M8B-Chevrolet	(United States) Oscar Koveleski	72	-3 laps	16	10
5	55	(Canada) Roger McCaig	McLaren M8C-Chevrolet	(Canada) Roger McCaig	72	-3 laps	18	8
6	66	(United Kingdom) Vic Elford	Chaparral 2J-Chevrolet	(United States) Chaparral Cars Inc.	69	-6 laps	1	6
7	7	(United Kingdom) Peter Gethin	McLaren M8D-Chevrolet	(United Kingdom) Bruce McLaren Motor Racing	68	Gearbox	3	4
8	81	(United States) Dick Durant	Lola T163-Chevrolet	(United States) Dick Durant	66	-9 laps	20	3
9	14	(New Zealand) Graeme Lawrence	McLaren M12-Chevrolet	(Canada) Canadian Can-Am Racing Team	63	-12 laps	13	2
10	34	(United States) George Drolsom	Lola T70 Mk.3-Chevrolet	(United States) George Drolsom	54	-21 laps	25	1
11	39	(Canada) Rainer Brezinka	McLaren M1C-Chevrolet	(Canada) Rainer Brezinka	51	-24 laps	24	
12	10	(United States) Chuck Parsons	Lola T160/3-Chevrolet	(United States) Chuck Parsons	50	Head gasket	8	
DNF	98	(Canada) George Eaton	BRM P154-Chevrolet	(United Kingdom) Castrol Team BRM	49	Blown engine	5	
DNF	26	(United States) Peter Revson	Lola T220-Chevrolet	(United States) Carl Haas	29	Puncture, accident	4	
DNF	3	(United States) Bobby Brown	McLaren M6B-Chevrolet	(United States) Bob Brown Racing Inc.	29	Accident	6	
DNF	15	(United States) Lee Roy Yarbrough	Ford G7A	(United States) Agapiou Brothers	22	Engine	11	
DNF	47	(Canada) Gordon Dewar	McLaren M6B-Chevrolet	(Canada) Gordon Dewar	20	Oil leak	14	
DNF	21	(United States) Bob Bondurant	Lola T160-Chevrolet	(United States) Smith-Oeser Racing	18	Body damage, overheating	7	
DNF	79	(United States) Tom Dutton	McLaren M6B-Chevrolet	Barrett Racing	16	Accident	15	
DNF	37	(United States) Clif Apel	McLaren M6B-Chevrolet	(United States) Clif Apel	16	Accident	22	
DNF	67	(United States) Eno de Pasquale	Lola T163-Chevrolet	(United States) Eno de Pasquale	11	Clutch	21	
DNF	5	(New Zealand) Denny Hulme	McLaren M8D-Chevrolet	(United Kingdom) Bruce McLaren Motor Racing	10	Accident body damage	2	
DNF	19	(United States) Gary Wilson	Lola T163-Chevrolet	(United States) Gary Wilson	9	Accident	17	
DNF	74	(United States) Dick Smith	McLaren M12-Chevrolet	(United States) Dick Smith/George Harm	2	Oil leak	26	
DNF	70	Mike Barbour	Rattenbury Mk.4B-Oldsmobile	Mike Barbour	1	Connecting rod	27	
DNF	17	(United States) Ron Goldleaf	McLaren M6B-Chevrolet	(United States) Ron Goldleaf	1	Accident	23	
DNF	32	(United States) Tony Adamowicz	Lola T70 Mk.3-Chevrolet	(United States) Vic Nelli	0	Fuel starvation	19	
DNS	-	(United States) William Wonder	McLaren M1C-Chevrolet	(United States) Bill Wonder				
DNS	24	(United States) Bob Nagel	Lola T70 Mk.3-Ford	(United States) Bob Nagel				
DNS	25	(United States) Jerry Hodges	McKee Mk.10-Chevrolet	(United States) Hodges Racing				
