= 1970 Can-Am season =

North American auto racing season

Seasons
- ← 1969 1971 →

The 1970 Canadian-American Challenge Cup was the fifth season of the Can-Am auto racing series. It consisted of FIA Group 7 racing cars running two-hour sprint events. It began June 14, 1970, and ended November 1, 1970, after ten rounds.

The 1970 season began only a few days after the death of defending champion Bruce McLaren. McLaren had been testing the new M8D for his Can-Am team when he was killed. Denny Hulme was joined by friend Dan Gurney in the second McLaren, but he was replaced by Peter Gethin following sponsorship conflicts. The team overcame the loss of their leader to win nine of ten races during the 1970 season.

== Schedule ==
Rnd	Race	Circuit	Date
1	Labatt's Blue Trophy	Mosport Park	June 14
2	Mont-Tremblant 50	Circuit Mont-Tremblant	June 28
3	Watkins Glen Can-Am	Watkins Glen International	July 12
4	Klondike Trail 200	Edmonton Speedway Park	July 26
5	Buckeye Can-Am	Mid-Ohio Sports Car Course	August 23
6	Road America Can-Am	Road America	August 30
7	Road Atlanta Can-Am	Road Atlanta	September 13
8	Minneapolis Tribune Grand Prix	Donnybrooke International Raceway	September 27
9	Monterey Castrol Grand Prix	Laguna Seca Raceway	October 18
10	Los Angeles Times Grand Prix	Riverside International Raceway	November 1

== Entries ==
Team	Chassis	Engine	Tire	Number	Drivers	Rounds
(United Kingdom) J. W. Automotive Engineering, Ltd.	Porsche 917K	Porsche 4.9 L Flat-12	F	1	(Switzerland) Jo Siffert	3
(United Kingdom) J. W. Automotive Engineering, Ltd.	Porsche 917K	Porsche 4.9 L Flat-12	F	2	(Mexico) Pedro Rodríguez	3
(United Kingdom) J. W. Automotive Engineering, Ltd.	Porsche 917K	Porsche 4.9 L Flat-12	F	6	(United Kingdom) Brian Redman	3
(United Kingdom) British Racing Motors	BRM P154	Chevrolet 7.6 L V8	G	1	(Mexico) Pedro Rodríguez	8–10
(United Kingdom) British Racing Motors	BRM P154	Chevrolet 7.6 L V8	G	98	(Canada) George Eaton	All
(United States) Bob Brown Racing, Inc.	McLaren M6B	Chevrolet 7.6 L V8	G	3	(United States) Bob Brown	1–7, 9–10
(United Kingdom) McLaren Cars, Ltd.	McLaren M8D	Chevrolet 7.6 L V8	G	5	(New Zealand) Denny Hulme	All
(United Kingdom) McLaren Cars, Ltd.	McLaren M8D	Chevrolet 7.6 L V8	G	48/7	(United States) Dan Gurney	1–3
(United Kingdom) McLaren Cars, Ltd.	McLaren M8D	Chevrolet 7.6 L V8	G	48/7	(United Kingdom) Peter Gethin	4–10
(United States) William R. Cupp	McLaren-Elva Mk. III	Chevrolet 6.0 L V8	F	6	(United States) Bill Cupp	9
(United States) Monte's Motors	McLaren-Elva Mk. III	Chevrolet 7.0 L V8	F	7/58	(United States) Monte Shelton	4, 10
(United Kingdom) A. G. Dean	Porsche 908/02K	Porsche 3.0 L Flat-8	F	8	(United Kingdom) Tony Dean	All
(United States) Overhauser Racing	Lola T163	Dodge 7.0 L V8	G	9	(United States) Ron Grable	6
(United States) Overhauser Racing	Lola T163	Dodge 7.0 L V8	G	9	(United States) Roy Woods	9–10
(United States) Douglas Shierson Racing	Lola T163	Chevrolet 6.0 L V8	G	10	(United States) Chuck Parsons	5–10
(United States) Motschenbacher Racing Enterprises	McLaren M8B; McLaren M12; McLaren M8C	Chevrolet 7.6 L V8	G	11	(Germany) Lothar Motschenbacher	All
(United States) Motschenbacher Racing Enterprises	McLaren M12	Chevrolet 7.6 L V8	G	12	(United States) Tony Adamowicz	9–10
(United States) Dick Roe	McKee	Chevrolet 6.0 L V8	G	12	(United States) Dick Roe	8
(Canada) TG Racing Tire, Ltd. (Canada) Hasgo Auto Imports	McLaren M12	Chevrolet 7.6 L V8	G	13/73	(United States) Jerry Titus	1–2
(Canada) TG Racing Tire, Ltd. (Canada) Hasgo Auto Imports	McLaren M12	Chevrolet 7.6 L V8	G	13/73	(United States) Peter Revson	2
(Canada) TG Racing Tire, Ltd. (Canada) Hasgo Auto Imports	McLaren M12	Chevrolet 7.6 L V8	G	13/73	(United Kingdom) David Hobbs	7, 9–10
(United States) Place Motor Supply	Wolverine LD65	Chevrolet V8		13	(United States) James Place	6
(Canada) Canadian Can-Am Racing Team	McLaren M12	Chevrolet 7.0 L V8	G	14	(New Zealand) Graeme Lawrence	All
(United States) Agapiou Brothers Racing	Ford G7A; Ford G7B	Ford 7.0 L V8; Mercury 8.1 L V8	G	15	(Canada) John Cannon	3, 6, 9–10
(United States) Agapiou Brothers Racing	Ford G7A; Ford G7B	Ford 7.0 L V8; Mercury 8.1 L V8	G	15	(United Kingdom) David Hobbs	4
(United States) Agapiou Brothers Racing	Ford G7A; Ford G7B	Ford 7.0 L V8; Mercury 8.1 L V8	G	15	(United States) LeeRoy Yarbrough	7
(United States) Agapiou Brothers Racing	Ford G7A; Ford G7B	Ford 7.0 L V8; Mercury 8.1 L V8	G	15	(United Kingdom) Vic Elford	8
(United States) Nichols Advanced Vehicle Systems	AVS Shadow	Chevrolet 8.1 L V8	F	16/1	(United States) George Follmer	1–2
(United States) Nichols Advanced Vehicle Systems	AVS Shadow	Chevrolet 8.1 L V8	F	16/1	(United Kingdom) Vic Elford	5
(United States) Glen Racing, Ltd.	McLaren M6B	Chevrolet 7.0 L V8	G	17	(United States) Ron Goldleaf	1–3, 5–7
(United States) Jerry Rosbach	Lola T70 Mk. 3	Chevrolet 7.0 L V8	G	18	(United States) Jerry Rosbach	6, 8, 10
(United States) Wilson Racing	Lola T163	Chevrolet 7.0 L V8	G	19	(United States) Gary Wilson	All
(United States) Lake Hill Gulf	McLaren-Elva Mk. III	Chevrolet 5.9 L V8	F	20	(United States) Dick Losk	4, 9
(United States) North American Racing Team	Ferrari 512 S Spyder	Ferrari 5.0 L V12	G	20	(Mexico) Pedro Rodríguez	5–6
(United States) Smith-Oeser Racing	Lola T160	Chevrolet 7.0 L V8	G	21	(United States) Jerry Smith	1
(United States) Smith-Oeser Racing	Lola T160	Chevrolet 7.0 L V8	G	21	(United States) Bob Bondurant	2–7, 9–10
(United States) Smith-Oeser Racing	Lola T160	Chevrolet 7.0 L V8	G	21	(Canada) John Cordts	8
(United States) Smith-Oeser Racing	McKee Mk. 10	Chevrolet 7.0 L V8	G	25	(United States) Jerry Smith	10
(United States) Titanium Racing Components, Ltd.	Autocoast Ti22; Autocoast Ti22 Mk. II	Chevrolet 8.1 L V8	G	22	(United Kingdom) Jackie Oliver	1–2, 9–10
(United States) Nagel Racing	Lola T70 Mk. 3	Ford 7.0 L V8	G	24	(United States) Bob Nagel	1–3, 5–7, 10
(United States) Hodges Racing Team	McKee Mk. 10	Chevrolet 7.0 L V8		25	(United States) Jerry Hodges	7, 9
(United States) Carl A. Haas Racing Teams, Inc.	Lola T220	Chevrolet 7.6 L V8	G	26	(United States) Peter Revson	All
(United States) Midwest Racing	McLaren M6B	Ford 7.0 L V8		27	(United States) Frank Kahlich	3, 5–6, 8
(United States) Midwest Racing	McLaren M6B	Ford 7.0 L V8		27	(United Kingdom) Vic Elford	8
(United States) Richard Brown	McLaren M6B	Chevrolet 6.0 L V8		28	(United States) Dick Brown	1
(United States) Jef Stevens	Lola T163	Chevrolet V8	G	29	(United States) Jef Stevens	2
(United States) Don Jensen	Burnett Mk. 2	Chevrolet 6.0 L V8	G	30	(United States) Don Jensen	9
(United States) Porsche Audi Division	Porsche 917K	Porsche 4.5 L Flat-12	G	31	(United Kingdom) Vic Elford	3
(United States) Porsche Audi Division	Porsche 917K	Porsche 4.5 L Flat-12	G	32	(United Kingdom) Richard Attwood	3
(United States) Peck & Hills Wholesale Furniture	McLaren M6B	Chevrolet 6.0 L V8	G	31	(United States) Jay Hills	10
(United States) Nelli Racing Enterprises	Lola T70 Mk. 3B	Chevrolet 7.3 L V8	G	31/32	(United States) Tony Adamowicz	4, 7
(United States) Nelli Racing Enterprises	Lola T70 Mk. 3B	Chevrolet 7.3 L V8	G	31/32	(United Kingdom) Vic Elford	6
(United States) Nelli Racing Enterprises	Lola T70 Mk. 3B	Chevrolet 7.3 L V8	G	31/32	(United States) Dick Guldstrand	9–10
(Germany) Gelo Racing Team	Ferrari 512 S	Ferrari 5.0 L V12		33	(Germany) Georg Loos	3
(United States) F & H Racing	McKee Mk. 6B	Oldsmobile 7.0 L V8		33	(United States) Chuck Frederick	4, 6, 8–9
(United States) Warren Burmester	Lola T70 Mk. 3B	Chevrolet 7.0 L V8	F	34	(United States) George Drolsom	6–7
(Germany) International Martini & Rossi Racing Team	Porsche 917K	Porsche 4.5 L Flat-12	F	35	(Netherlands) Gijs van Lennep	3
(Germany) International Martini & Rossi Racing Team	Porsche 908/02K	Porsche 3.0 L Flat-8	F	36	(France) Gérard Larrousse	3
(United States) Hopkins, Denner, Rupp Racing Enterprises	Lola T160	Chevrolet 7.3 L V8		35	(United States) Danny Hopkins	10
(United States) Cliff Apel	McLaren M6B	Chevrolet 6.0 L V8	G	37	(United States) Cliff Apel	2–3, 6–7
(Canada) Rainer Brezinka	McLaren-Elva Mk. III	Chevrolet 6.0 L V8	F	39	(Canada) Rainer Brezinka	1, 5, 7–8
(Canada) Rainer Brezinka	McLaren-Elva Mk. III	Chevrolet 6.0 L V8	F	39	(Canada) Horst Petemann	2
(United States) Innovation Racing	Mac's-It Special	4x Rotax 0.8 L Inline-2	F	41	(Japan) Hiroshi Fushida	9
(United States) Lasiter & Chohlis Racing	Lola T70 Mk. 3B	Ford 7.0 L V8	F	42	(United States) Harvey Lasiter	9
(United States) Lasiter & Chohlis Racing	Lola T70 Mk. 3B	Ford 7.0 L V8	F	42	(United States) Lou Sell	10
(United States) M. Brooke Doran	Lola T163B	Chevrolet 7.0 L V8	F	43	(United States) Brooke Doran	1, 3
(United States) Jerry Hansen	Lola T165	Chevrolet 7.0 L V8	G	44	(United States) Jerry Hansen	6
(United States) Mike Koslosky	Len Terry T10	Chevrolet 6.0 L V8	G	45	(United States) Skeeter McKitterick	10
(Canada) JNO Racing Enterprises, Ltd.	McLaren M6B	Chevrolet 7.0 L V8	G	47	(Canada) Gordon Dewar	1–2, 4–8
(Switzerland) Ecurie Bonnier	Lola T70 Mk. 3B GT	Chevrolet 5.0 L V8	G	50	(Sweden) Jo Bonnier	3
(United States) David F. Causey	Lola T163	Chevrolet 7.0 L V8	F	51	(United States) Dave Causey	All
(United States) Auto World, Inc.	McLaren M8B	Chevrolet 7.0 L V8	G	54	(United States) Oscar Koveleski	1–3, 5–8, 10
(Canada) McCaig Racing Enterprises, Inc.	McLaren M8C	Chevrolet 7.0 L V8	G	55	(Canada) Roger McCaig	All
(Canada) Performance Engineering, Ltd.	McLaren M8C	Chevrolet 7.4 L V8	F	57	(Canada) John Cordts	1–4
(United States) Sport World, Inc.	Lola T165	Chevrolet 7.0 L V8	F	59	(United States) Peter Gregg	8–10
(Canada) Ric Moore	Moore Mk. 2	Chevrolet V8		61	(Canada) Ric Moore	4
(United States) Stan Burnett	Burnett Mk. 4	Chevrolet 7.0 L V8		64/28/38	(United States) Stan Burnett	8–10
(United States) Chaparral Cars, Inc.	Chaparral 2J	Chevrolet 7.0 L V8	F	66	(United Kingdom) Jackie Stewart	3
(United States) Chaparral Cars, Inc.	Chaparral 2J	Chevrolet 7.0 L V8	F	66	(United Kingdom) Vic Elford	7, 9–10
(United States) Eno de Pasquale Engineering, Inc.	Lola T163	Chevrolet 8.1 L V8	G	67/3	(United States) Eno de Pasquale	1, 3, 7
(United States) Eno de Pasquale Engineering, Inc.	Lola T163	Chevrolet 8.1 L V8	G	67/3	(United States) Bob Brown	8
(Canada) Mike Barbour	Rattenbury Mk. 4B	Oldsmobile 4.3 L V8	F	70	(Canada) Mike Barbour	3–8
(United States) David R. Selway	McLaren-Elva Mk. III	Chevrolet 5.7 L V8	G	70	(United States) Dave Selway	9
(United States) Tom Swindell	Lola T70 Mk. 3	Chevrolet 7.0 L V8		71	(United States) Tom Swindell	5–6, 8
(United States) Dick Smith & George Harm Racing	McLaren M12	Ford 7.0 L V8	G	74	(United States) Dick Smith	7, 9–10
(United States) Fayer-Dini Enterprises	Lola T162	Chevrolet 7.0 L V8		75	(United States) Bob Dini	1–2
(United States) Professional Racing, Ltd. (United States) Earle-Cord Racing	Ferrari 512 S Spyder; Ferrari 612 P	Ferrari 5.0 L V12	F	76	(United States) Jim Adams	3–5, 9–10
(United States) Janke Auto Company	McLaren-Elva Mk. III	Chevrolet 7.4 L V8	F	77	(United States) Leonard Janke	1, 4–5
(United Kingdom) March Engineering Ltd.	March 707	Chevrolet 7.6 L V8	F	77	(New Zealand) Chris Amon	8–10
(United States) Barrett Racing	McLaren M6B	Chevrolet 7.0 L V8	G	79	(United States) Tom Dutton	5–7
(United States) Racing Associates, Inc.	Lola T163	Chevrolet 7.0 L V8	F	81	(United States) Dick Durant	1–2, 5–8
(United States) William M. Wonder	McLaren-Elva Mk. III	Chevrolet V8		84	(United States) William Wonder	1, 7
(United States) Chuck McConnell	McLaren-Elva Mk. III	Chevrolet 7.0 L V8		88	(United States) Chuck McConnell	10
(Italy) Ferrari SpA SEFAC	Ferrari 512 S Spyder	Ferrari 5.0 L V12	F	91	(Belgium) Jacky Ickx	3
(Italy) Ferrari SpA SEFAC	Ferrari 512 S Spyder	Ferrari 5.0 L V12	F	92	(United States) Mario Andretti	3
(United States) O. A. Thornsjo	Lola T160	Chevrolet 6.0 L V8		91	(United States) Orly Thornsjo	5–6
(United States) David P. Hurley	McLaren-Elva Mk. IIB	Chevrolet V8		92	(United States) David Hurley	1
(United States) Newport Racers	McLaren Special	Chevrolet 6.0 L V8	F	92	(United States) Ed Leslie	9–10
(United States) Newport Racers	McLaren Special	Chevrolet 6.0 L V8	F	92	(United States) Ted Peterson	10
(United States) Richard Kantrud	Lola T70 Mk. 3	Chevrolet 7.0 L V8	G	97	(United States) Dick Kantrud	6, 8

== Season results ==
Rnd	Circuit	Winning team	Results
Rnd	Circuit	Winning driver	Results
1	Mosport	(United Kingdom) #48 McLaren Cars	Results
1	Mosport	(United States) Dan Gurney	Results
2	Mont-Tremblant	(United Kingdom) #48 Bruce McLaren Motor Racing	Results
2	Mont-Tremblant	(United States) Dan Gurney	Results
3	Watkins Glen	(United Kingdom) #5 Bruce McLaren Motor Racing	Results
3	Watkins Glen	(New Zealand) Denny Hulme	Results
4	Edmonton	(United Kingdom) #5 Bruce McLaren Motor Racing	Results
4	Edmonton	(New Zealand) Denny Hulme	Results
5	Mid-Ohio	(United Kingdom) #5 Bruce McLaren Motor Racing	Results
5	Mid-Ohio	(New Zealand) Denny Hulme	Results
6	Road America	(United Kingdom) #7 Bruce McLaren Motor Racing	Results
6	Road America	(United Kingdom) Peter Gethin	Results
7	Road Atlanta	(United Kingdom) #8 A.G. Dean Ltd.	Results
7	Road Atlanta	(United Kingdom) Tony Dean	Results
8	Donnybrooke	(United Kingdom) #5 Bruce McLaren Motor Racing	Results
8	Donnybrooke	(New Zealand) Denny Hulme	Results
9	Laguna Seca	(United Kingdom) #5 Bruce McLaren Motor Racing	Results
9	Laguna Seca	(New Zealand) Denny Hulme	Results
10	Riverside	(United Kingdom) #5 Bruce McLaren Motor Racing	Results
10	Riverside	(New Zealand) Denny Hulme	Results

== Drivers Championship ==
Points are awarded to the top ten finishers in the order of 20-15-12-10-8-6-4-3-2-1. Only the best seven finishes out of ten rounds counted towards the championship. Points earned but not counting towards the championship are marked by parenthesis.

Pos	Driver	Team	Car	Engine	Rd 1	Rd 2	Rd 3	Rd 4	Rd 5	Rd 6	Rd 7	Rd 8	Rd 9	Rd10	Total
1	(New Zealand) Denny Hulme	(United Kingdom) Bruce McLaren Racing	McLaren M8D	Chevrolet	12		20	20	20			20	20	20	132
2	(Germany) Lothar Motschenbacher	(United States) Motschenbacher Racing	McLaren M8B; McLaren M12; McLaren M8C	Chevrolet		15		12	12		12	6		8	65
3	(United Kingdom) Peter Gethin	(United Kingdom) Bruce McLaren Racing	McLaren M8B	Chevrolet				12	2	20	4	15			56
4	(United States) Dave Causey	(United States) Dave Causey	Lola T163	Chevrolet	4	2		8		12	15	3	(2)	3	47
5	(United Kingdom) Jackie Oliver	(United States) Autocoast Titanium Racing	Autocoast Ti22	Chevrolet	15								15	15	45
6	(United Kingdom) Tony Dean	(United Kingdom) A.G. Dean Ltd.	Porsche 908/02	Porsche	10					8	20	4		2	44
7	(United States) Dan Gurney	(United Kingdom) Bruce McLaren Racing	McLaren M8D	Chevrolet	20	20	2								42
8	(United States) Peter Revson	(United States) Carl Haas Racing	Lola T220	Chevrolet					15			12	12		39
9	(United States) Bobby Brown	(United States) Bob Brown Racing (United States) Eno de Pasquale	McLaren M6B; Lola T163	Chevrolet		10	3	10		6				6	35
10	(Canada) Roger McCaig	(Canada) Roger McCaig	McLaren M8C	Chevrolet	8	8		3	6		8			1	34
11	(New Zealand) Chris Amon	(United Kingdom) March Engineering	March 707	Chevrolet								8	10	10	28
12	(United States) Gary Wilson	(United States) Gary Wilson	Lola T163	Chevrolet				6	8	10			3		27
13	(Mexico) Pedro Rodríguez	(United Kingdom) J.W. Automotive (United States) North American Racing Team (United Kingdom) Castrol Team BRM	Porsche 917K; Ferrari 512S; BRM P154	Porsche; Ferrari; Chevrolet								2	8	12	26
14	(United States) Chuck Parsons	(United States) Chuck Parsons	Lola T160/3	Chevrolet		3			10				6		19
15=	(United Kingdom) Vic Elford	(United States) Porsche-Audi USA (United States) Advanced Vehicle Systems (United States) Vic Nelli (United States) Chaparral Cars Inc. (United States) Frank Kahlich (United States) Agapiou Brothers Racing	Porsche 917K; AVS Shadow; Lola T70 Mk.3; Chaparral 2J; McLaren M6B; Ford G7A	Porsche; Chevrolet; Chevrolet; Chevrolet; Ford; Ford			10				6				16
15=	(United States) Oscar Koveleski	(United States) Oscar Koveleski	McLaren M8B	Chevrolet		6					10				16
17=	(Switzerland) Jo Siffert	(United Kingdom) J.W. Automotive	Porsche 917K	Porsche			15								15
17=	(United States) Bob Bondurant	(United States) Smith-Oeser Racing	Lola T160	Chevrolet						15					15
19	(United States) Jim Adams	(United States) Earle-Cord Racing	Ferrari 512S; Ferrari 512S	Ferrari				4				10			14
20=	(Canada) George Eaton	(United Kingdom) Castrol Team BRM	BRM P154	Chevrolet		12									12
20=	(United Kingdom) Richard Attwood	(United States) Porsche-Audi USA	Porsche 917K	Porsche			12								12
22	(United States) Dick Durant	(United States) Dick Durant	Lola T163	Chevrolet	3				4	2	3				12
23	(United States) Mario Andretti	(Italy) SpA Ferrari SEFAC	Ferrari 712P	Ferrari			8								8
24	(United States) Tony Adamowicz	(United States) Vic Nelli (United States) Motschenbacher Racing	Lola T70 Mk.3; McLaren M12	Chevrolet									4	4	8
25=	(Canada) Gordon Dewar	(Canada) Gordon Dewar	McLaren M6B	Chevrolet	6										6
25=	(Netherlands) Gijs van Lennep	(Germany) Martini Racing	Porsche 917K	Porsche			6								6
27	(New Zealand) Graeme Lawrence	(Canada) Canadian Can-Am Racing	McLaren M12	Chevrolet						3	2		1		6
28	(United Kingdom) Brian Redman	(United Kingdom) J.W. Automotive	Porsche 917K	Porsche			4								4
29=	(United States) Brooke Doran	(United States) Marshall Brooke Doran	Lola T163	Chevrolet	2										2
29=	(United States) Leonard Janke	(United States) Janke Auto Inc.	McLaren M1C	Chevrolet				2							2
31=	(Canada) Rainer Brezinka	(Canada) Rainer Brezinka	McLaren M1C	Chevrolet	1										1
31=	(United States) Cliff Apel	(United States) Cliff Apel	McLaren M6B	Chevrolet		1									1
31=	(France) Gérard Larrousse	(Germany) Martini Racing	Porsche 908/02	Porsche			1								1
31=	(United States) Chuck Frederick	(United States) C.E. Frederick	McKee Mk.6B	Oldsmobile				1							1
31=	(United States) Bob Nagel	(United States) Bob Nagel	Lola T70 Mk.3	Ford					1						1
31=	(United States) Ron Goldleaf	(United States) Ron Goldleaf	McLaren M6B	Chevrolet						1					1
31=	(United States) George Drolsom	(United States) George Drolsom	Lola T70 Mk.3	Chevrolet							1				1
31=	(United States) Peter Gregg	(United States) Peter Gregg	Lola T165	Chevrolet								1			1
