= Imola Circuit =

Motorsport venue in Italy

- Configuration for FIA sanctioned events

- Configuration for FIM sanctioned events
- Location: Imola, Emilia-Romagna, Italy
- Coordinates: 44°20′28″N 11°42′48″E
- Capacity: 78,000
- FIA Grade: 1
- Broke ground: 22 March 1950; 76 years ago
- Opened: 25 April 1953; 73 years ago
- Former names: Autodromo Dino Ferrari (1957–1988); Autodromo di Imola (1953–1956)
- Major events: Current: FIA WEC 6 Hours of Imola (2011, 2024–present); ELMS 4 Hours of Imola (2013–2016, 2022, 2024–present); Lamborghini Super Trofeo Europe (2017, 2022, 2024, 2026); Future: GT World Challenge Europe (2020, 2022, 2027); Ferrari Challenge Finali Mondiali (1998, 2022, 2024, 2027); Former: Formula One; Emilia Romagna Grand Prix (2020–2022, 2024–2025); San Marino Grand Prix (1981–2006); Italian Grand Prix (1980); Grand Prix motorcycle racing; City of Imola motorcycle Grand Prix (1996–1999); Italian motorcycle Grand Prix (1969, 1972, 1974–1975, 1977, 1979, 1988); San Marino motorcycle Grand Prix (1981, 1983); World SBK (2001–2006, 2009–2019, 2023); FIM EWC (1966, 1982, 2002–2003); MXGP (2019–2020); International GT Open (2009–2011, 2021); FIA WTCC (2005, 2008–2009); FIA GT (2004–2005); Imola 200 (1972–1978, 1980–1985); World Sportscar Championship (1965, 1974, 1984)
- Website: autodromoimola.it

Grand Prix Circuit (2008–present)
- Length: 4.909 km (3.050 mi)
- Turns: 19
- Race lap record: 1:15.484 ( (United Kingdom) Lewis Hamilton, Mercedes W11, 2020, F1)

Motorcycle Circuit (2009–present)
- Length: 4.936 km (3.067 mi)
- Turns: 20
- Race lap record: 1:45.727 ( (United Kingdom) Chaz Davies, Ducati Panigale V4 R, 2019, World SBK)

Grand Prix Circuit (1995–2006)
- Length: 4.959 km (3.081 mi)
- Turns: 22
- Race lap record: 1:20.411 ( (Germany) Michael Schumacher, Ferrari F2004, 2004, F1)

Grand Prix Circuit (1980–1994)
- Length: 5.040 km (3.132 mi)
- Turns: 22
- Race lap record: 1:24.335 ( (United Kingdom) Damon Hill, Williams FW16, 1994, F1)

Grand Prix Circuit (1973–1979)
- Length: 5.060 km (3.144 mi)
- Turns: 20
- Race lap record: 1:33.610 ( (Canada) Gilles Villeneuve, Ferrari 312T4, 1979, F1)

Original Grand Prix Circuit (1953–1972)
- Length: 5.018 km (3.118 mi)
- Turns: 12
- Race lap record: 1:27.700 ( (Austria) Helmut Marko, BRM P167, 1972, Group 7)

The Imola Circuit, officially called Autodromo Internazionale Enzo e Dino Ferrari (Italian for 'Enzo and Dino Ferrari International Autodrome'), is a 4.909 km (3.050 mi) motor racing circuit. It is located in the town of Imola, in the Emilia-Romagna region of Italy, 40 km (25 mi) east of Bologna. Initially used for motorcycle racing, the first race at Imola was held in 1953. The circuit has an FIA Grade One licence. The circuit is named after the founder of the Ferrari car company, Enzo Ferrari (1898–1988), and his son Alfredo "Dino" Ferrari (1932–1956). It was called the Autodromo di Imola from 1953 to 1956 and the Autodromo Dino Ferrari from 1957 to 1988.

Imola hosted non-championship Formula One races in the 1963 Imola Grand Prix and the 1979 Dino Ferrari Grand Prix. It was used for official championship races in the 1980 Italian Grand Prix and the San Marino Grand Prix every year from 1981 to 2006. Safety concerns with the circuit were raised throughout the 1980s and 1990s, particularly with the high speed Tamburello corner where numerous accidents occurred. This resulted in fatalities, including those that killed Roland Ratzenberger and Ayrton Senna in 1994. Chicanes were introduced at multiple points to reduce cornering speeds, which changed the nature of the course and caused problems with their high kerbs.

Formula One stopped racing at Imola in 2007, leading the circuit owners to undertake major reconstruction work to the track and pit lane facilities. After the work was completed, a contract was signed for Formula One to return to Imola from 2017, but legal disputes prevented this from occurring. It eventually returned in 2020, with the circuit hosting the Emilia Romagna Grand Prix. In 2023, Formula 1 announced that the Emilia Romagna Grand Prix would be cancelled due to floods. It returned as usual from 2024 to 2025. Formula 1 has not returned to Imola since 2026.When Formula One visited Imola, it was considered one of the home circuits of the Scuderia Ferrari racing team, which is based in nearby Maranello.

The circuit has hosted many other motor racing series, including the Superbike World Championship, Motocross World Championship, World Touring Car Championship and European Le Mans Series. Several road bicycle races have also used the circuit, including stages of the Giro d'Italia and UCI Road World Championships.

== History ==
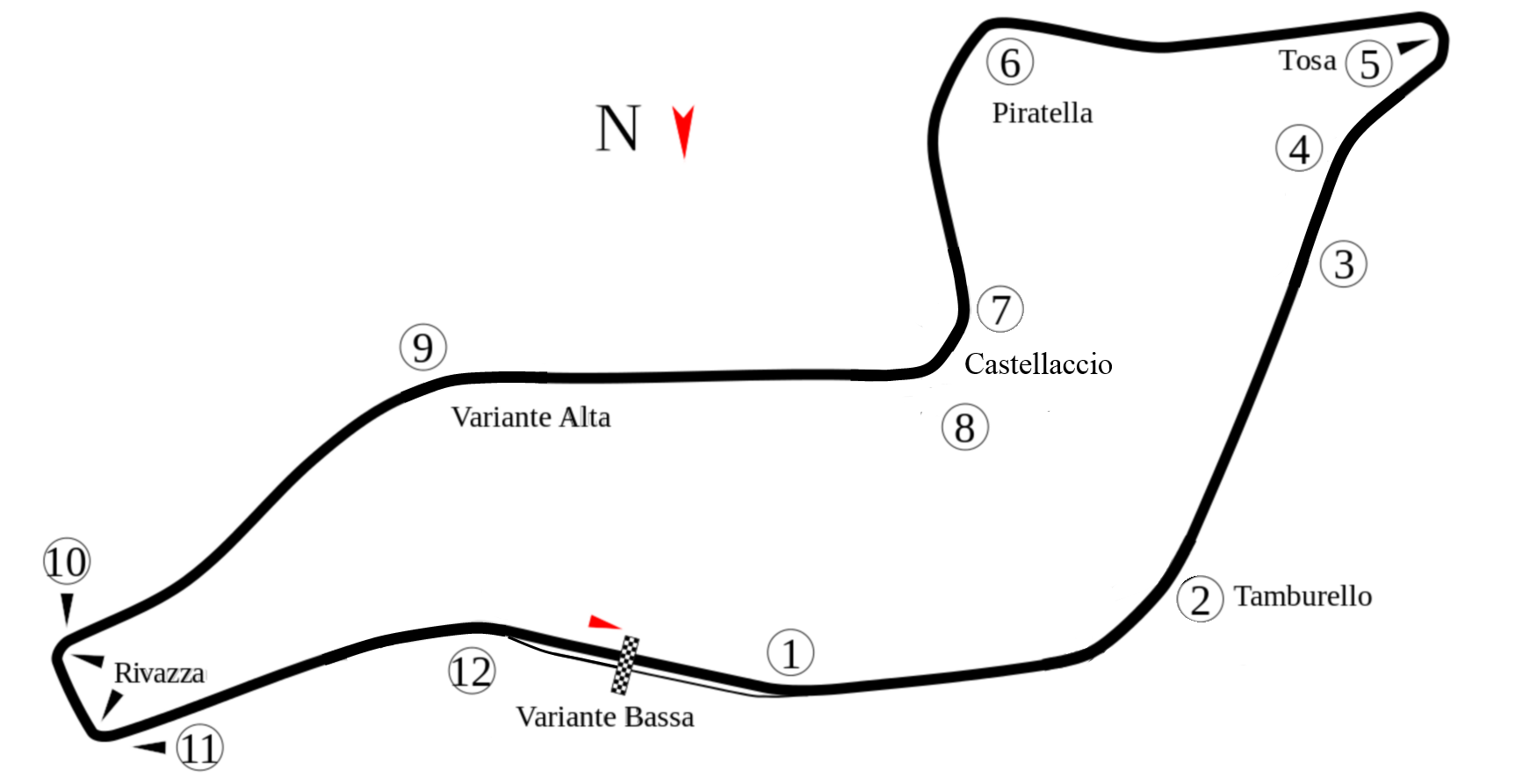
Original layout of the Imola Circuit with no chicanes (1953–1972)

The track was originally called the Autodromo di Imola, and inaugurated as a semi-permanent venue in 1953. It had no chicanes, so the runs from Acque Minerali to Rivazza, and from Rivazza all the way to Tosa, through the pits and the Tamburello, were just straights with a few small bends; the circuit remained in this configuration until 1972.

In April 1953, the first motorcycle races took place, while the first car race took place in June 1954. In April 1963, the circuit hosted its first Formula One race, as a non-championship event, won by Jim Clark for Lotus. A further non-championship event took place at Imola in 1979, which was won by Niki Lauda for Brabham-Alfa Romeo.

In 1980 Imola officially debuted in the Formula One World Championship calendar by hosting the 1980 Italian Grand Prix. It was the first time since the 1948 Edition held at Parco del Valentino that the Autodromo Nazionale Monza did not host the Italian Grand Prix. The race was won by Nelson Piquet and it was such a success that a new race, the San Marino Grand Prix, was established especially for Imola in 1981 and remained on the calendar until 2006. The race was held over 60 laps of the 5.040 km (3.132 mi) circuit for a total race distance of 300 kilometres.

Imola has hosted a round of the Superbike World Championship from 2001 to 2006 and later since 2009. It hosts the final round of the FIM Motocross World Championship since 2018.

The World Touring Car Championship visited Imola in 2005 for the Race of San Marino, in 2008 for the Race of Europe, and in 2009 for the Race of Italy. The venue hosted a round of the International GT Open from 2009 to 2011 and also in 2021. The TCR International Series raced at Imola in 2016.

The 6 Hours of Imola was revived in 2011 and added to the Le Mans Series and Intercontinental Le Mans Cup as a season event until 2016, but it returned again to European Le Mans Series calendar again in 2022 as 4 Hours of Imola. It also hosted the 12 Hours of Imola in 2017-2018, a round of the 24H Series.

The track was also used as part of the finishing circuit for the 1968 UCI Road World Championships, which saw Italian cyclist Vittorio Adorni winning with a lead of 10 minutes and 10 seconds over runner up Herman Van Springel, the second largest winning margin in the history of the championships, after Georges Ronsse's victory in 1928. In addition Adorni's countryman Michele Dancelli took the bronze and five of the top six finishers were Italian. The circuit was used for stage 11 of the 2015 Giro d'Italia, which was won by Ilnur Zakarin, and stage 12 of the 2018 Giro d'Italia, won by Sam Bennett. The circuit also served as the start and finish of the 2020 UCI Road World Championships on 27 September 2020.

== Tamburello ==
Despite the addition of chicanes to several parts of the lap, such as the Acque Minerali, Variante Alta, and Variante Bassa, the circuit was subject to constant safety concerns, mostly regarding the flat-out Tamburello corner, which was very bumpy and had dangerously little room between the track and a concrete wall without a tyre barrier that separated the circuit from the Santerno river that runs adjacent to it.

In 1987, Nelson Piquet crashed heavily during practice after a tyre failure and missed the race due to injury. In 1989, Gerhard Berger crashed his Ferrari at Tamburello after a front wing failure. The car instantaneously ignited after the severe impact at 300 km/h (190 mph) but thanks to the quick work of the firefighters and medical personnel Berger survived and missed only one race (the 1989 Monaco Grand Prix) due to burns to his hands. Michele Alboreto suffered a massive shunt whilst testing his Footwork Arrows at the circuit in 1991 but escaped injury. The following year, Riccardo Patrese also crashed at the same corner while testing for the Williams team.

In response to the deaths of Ayrton Senna and Roland Ratzenberger during the 1994 San Marino Grand Prix, modifications were carried out to the Tamburello corner to make it safer by converting it from a flat-out left hander to a left-right-left chicane.

== 1994 San Marino Grand Prix ==
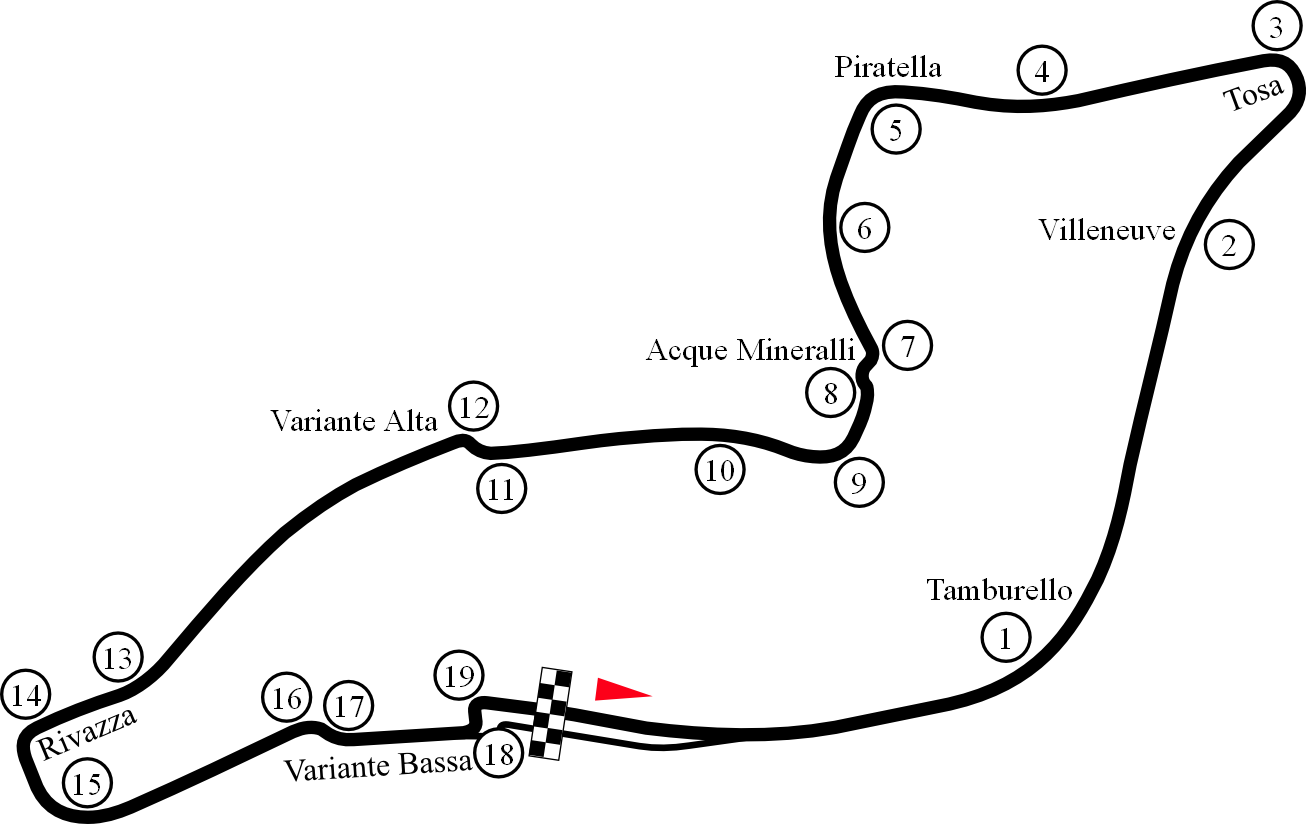
The circuit's layout at the time of the 1994 San Marino Grand Prix.

The circuit layout changed after 1994 San Marino Grand Prix, used between 1995–2006

In the 1994 San Marino Grand Prix, during Friday practice Rubens Barrichello was launched over a kerb and into the top of a tyre barrier at the Variante Bassa, knocking the Brazilian unconscious, though quick medical intervention saved his life. During Saturday qualifying Austrian Roland Ratzenberger crashed head-on into a wall at over 310 km/h (190 mph) at the Villeneuve corner after his Simtek lost the front wing, dying instantly from a basilar skull fracture. The tragedy continued the next day when the three-time World Champion Ayrton Senna's Williams' steering column broke and he crashed into the concrete wall at the Tamburello corner on Lap 7. Senna died in the hospital several hours after his crash. In two unrelated incidents, several spectators and mechanics were also injured during the event.

In the aftermath, the circuit continued to host Grands Prix, but revisions were immediately made in an attempt to make it safer. The flat-out Tamburello corner was reduced to a 4th gear left–right sweeper, and a gravel trap was added to the limited space on the outside of the corner. Villeneuve corner, previously an innocuous 6th gear right-hander into Tosa, was made a complementary 4th gear sweeper, also with a gravel trap on the outside of the corner. In an attempt to retain some of the quickness and character of the old circuit, the arduous chicane at Acqua Minerali was eliminated, and the Variante Bassa was straightened into a single chicane. Many say that the new circuit configuration is not as good as it used to be as a result of the new chicanes at Tamburello and Villeneuve.

Another modification made to the Imola track is that of Variante Alta, which is situated at the top of the hill leading down to Rivazza and has the hardest braking point on the lap. The Variante Alta, formerly a high-kerbed chicane, was hit quite hard by the drivers which caused damage to the cars and was the site of quite a few accidents. Before the 2006 Grand Prix, the kerbs were lowered considerably and the turn itself was tightened to reduce speeds and hopefully reduce the number of accidents at the chicane.

The Grand Prix was removed from the calendar of the 2007 Formula One season. SAGIS, the company that owns the circuit, hoped that the race would be reinstated at the October 2006 meeting of the FIA World Motor Sport Council and scheduled for the weekend of 29 April 2007, provided renovations to the circuit were completed in time for the race, but the reinstatement was denied.

== Recent developments ==
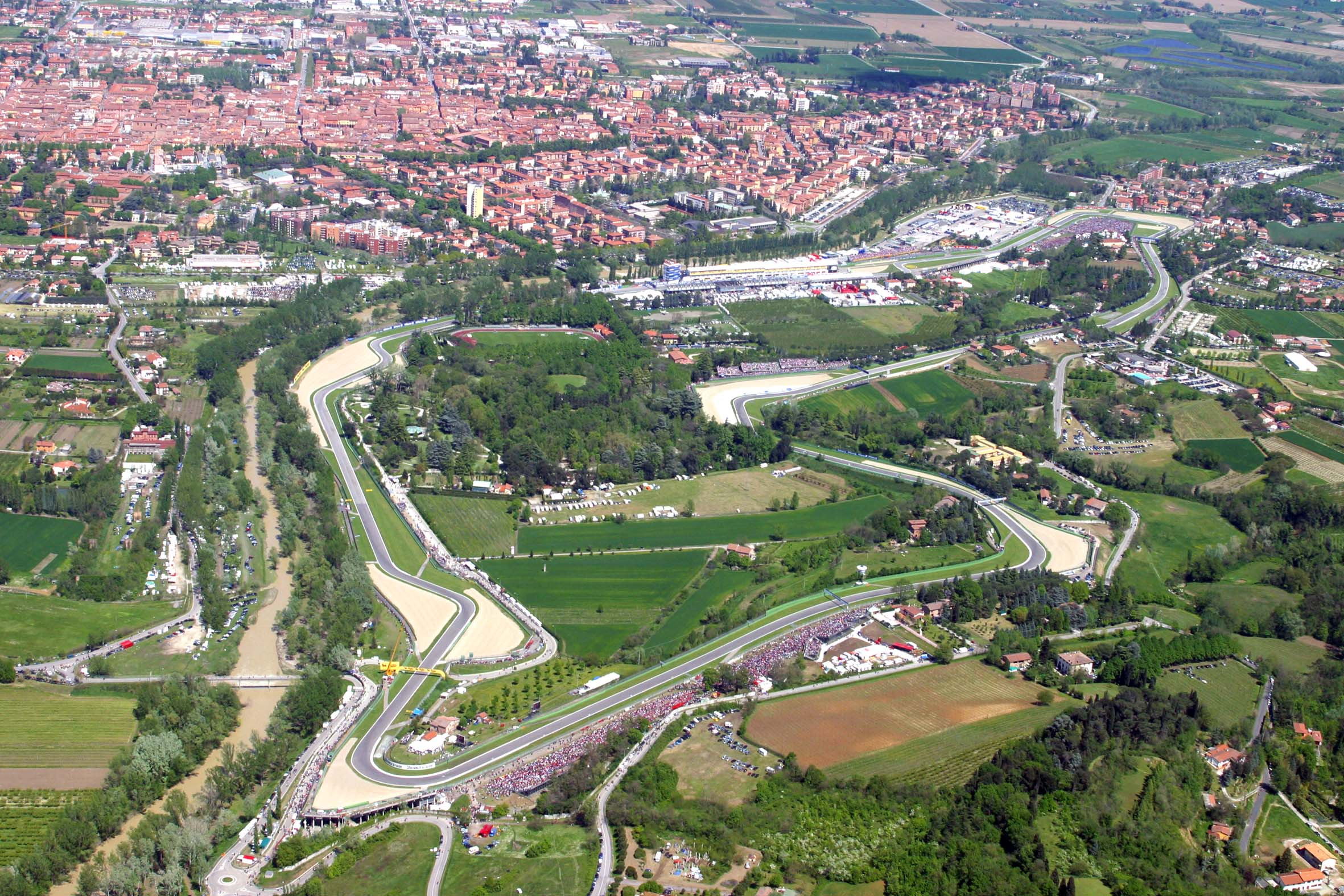
Aerial photo of the circuit.

Since 2007, the circuit has undergone major revisions. A bypass to the Variante Bassa chicane was added for cars, making the run from Rivazza 2 to the first Tamburello chicane totally flat-out, much like the circuit in its original fast-flowing days. However, the chicane is still used for motorcycle races.

The old pit garages and paddock have been demolished and completely rebuilt while the pitlane was extended and resurfaced. The reconstruction was overseen by German F1 track architect Hermann Tilke.

In June 2008, with most of the reconstruction work completed, The FIA gave the track a "1T" rating, meaning that an official Formula One Test can be held at the circuit; circuits require the "1" homologation to host a Formula One Grand Prix. As of August 2011, the track received a '1' FIA homologation rating after an inspection by Charlie Whiting.

In June 2015, the owners of the circuit confirmed they were in talks to return to the Formula One calendar should Monza, whose contract was scheduled to run out after the 2016 season, be unable to make a new deal to keep hosting a round of the world championship. On 18 July 2016, Imola signed a deal to host the Italian Grand Prix from the 2017 season. However, on 2 September 2016, it was announced that Monza had secured a new deal to continue hosting the race, and Imola's officials took legal action against this decision questioning the legality of government funding awarded to Monza. On 8 November 2016, they withdrew their case. In February 2020, the owners at Imola submitted a bid to replace the 2020 Chinese Grand Prix pending its cancellation as a precaution in the face of the COVID-19 pandemic. On 24 July 2020, it was confirmed that the circuit would be added to the calendar for the 2020 Formula One World Championship with the race being called the "Emilia Romagna Grand Prix" in honour of the region the circuit is situated in. In a break with Formula One tradition the event at the circuit took place over two days instead of three on 31 October and 1 November 2020. Imola was kept on the calendar for 2021, following the postponement of the Chinese Grand Prix due to the pandemic, and later for the 2022 calendar as well. The 2023 Grand Prix was set to be held on 21 May 2023 but had to be cancelled as a result of the 2023 Emilia-Romagna floods that also affected the Circuit by the flooding Santerno river. Imola hosted the Emilia Romagna Grand Prix until 2025. The following year, Imola was shortlisted for a return in favour of either the Qatar or Abu Dhabi Grands Prix should those races not go through.

The circuit's president is Giancarlo Minardi of the former Minardi F1 team.

== Layout history ==
Autodromo Internazionale Enzo e Dino Ferrari Layout History
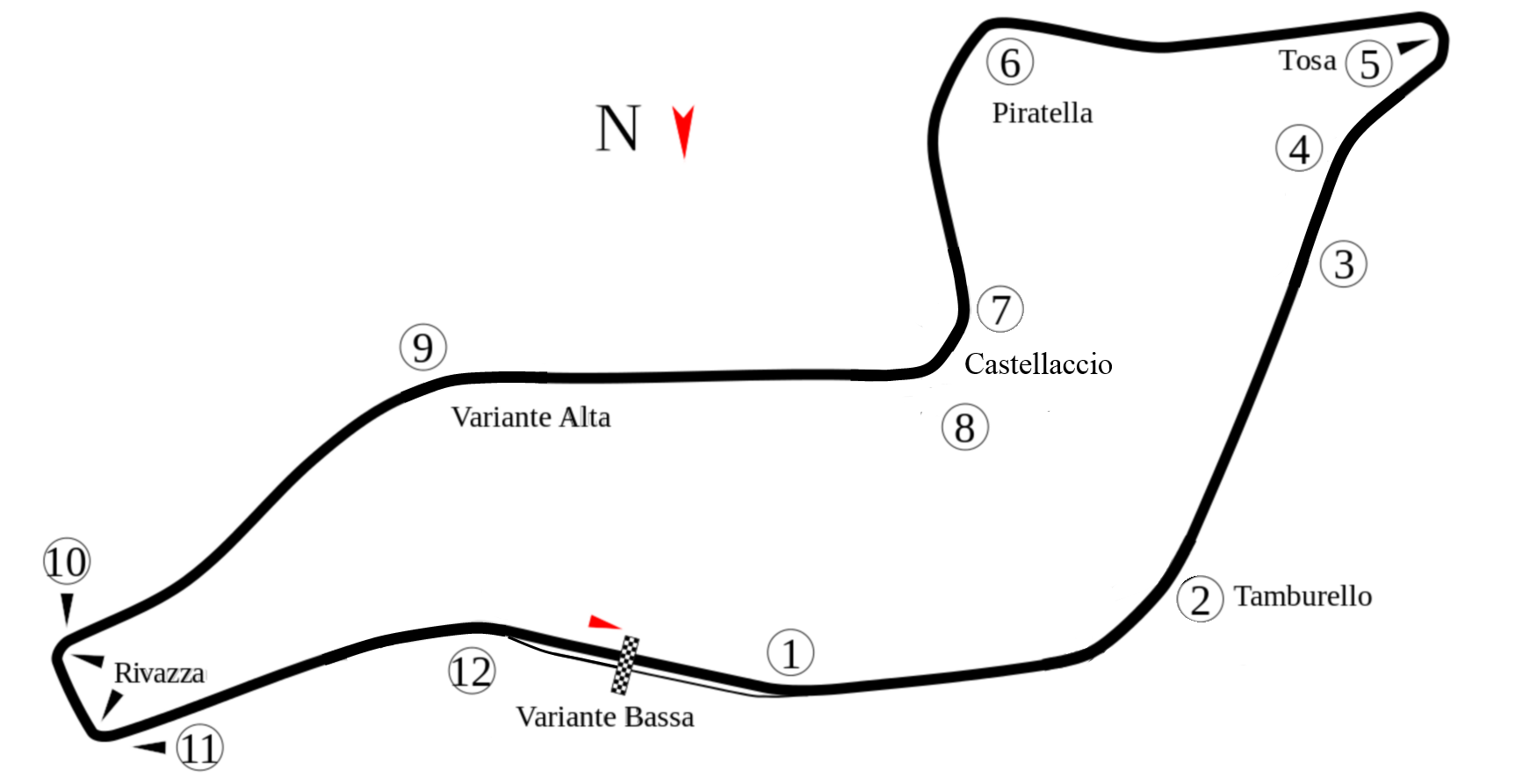
Original Grand Prix Circuit (1953–1972)

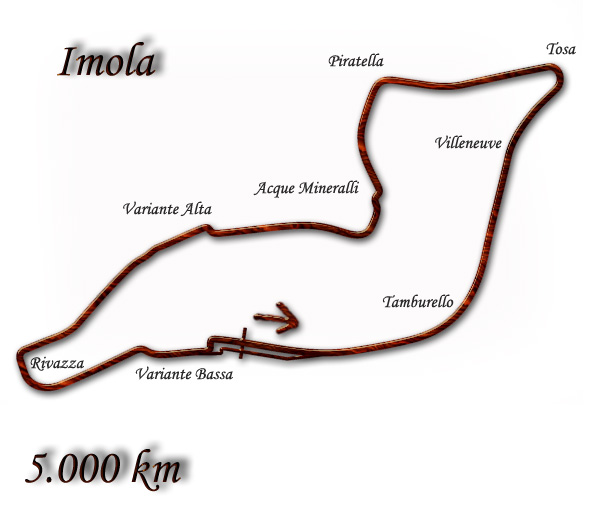
Original Grand Prix Circuit with Variante Alta and Variante Bassa (1973–1979)

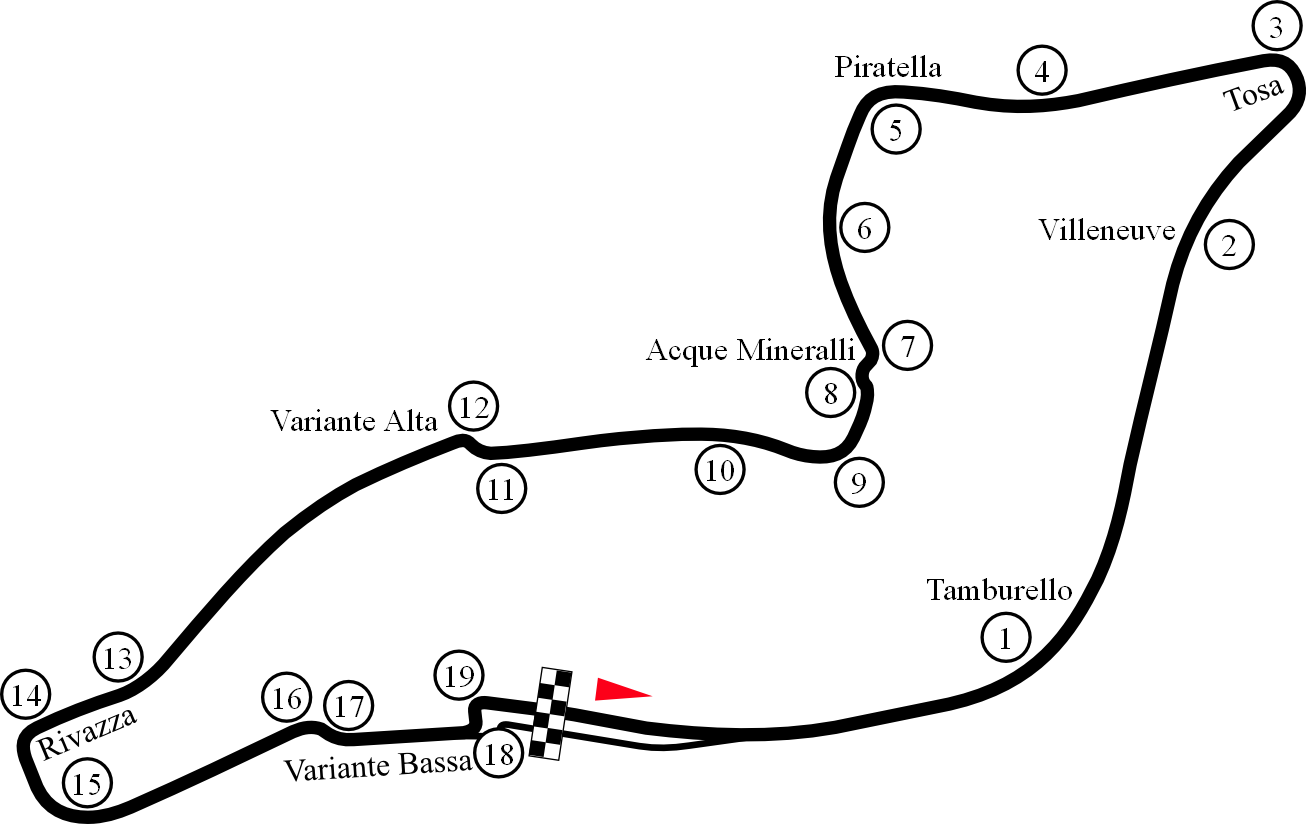
Grand Prix Circuit (1980–1994)

Grand Prix Circuit (1995–2006)

Grand Prix Circuit (2008–present)

Motorcycle Circuit (2009–present)

== Events ==
Current

- April: FIA World Endurance Championship 6 Hours of Imola, Italian GT Championship ACI Racing Weekend Imola, Porsche Carrera Cup Germany, TCR Italian Series, Italian Sport Prototypes Championship, Porsche Carrera Cup Italia, F2000 Italian Formula Trophy, Legends of Le Mans Series
- May: Lamborghini Super Trofeo Europe Lamborghini Arena
- July: European Le Mans Series 4 Hours of Imola, Eurocup-3, Porsche Carrera Cup Benelux
- September: Italian GT Championship ACI Racing Weekend Imola, Formula Regional European Championship, TCR Italian Series, Italian F4 Championship
- October: Classic Endurance Racing Imola Classic

Future

- E4 Championship (2027)
- Ferrari Challenge Finali Mondiali (1998, 2022, 2024, 2027)
- GT World Challenge Europe
  - 3 Hours of Imola (2020, 2022, 2027)
- GT2 European Series (2022, 2027)
- GT4 European Series (2020, 2022, 2027)
- Porsche Carrera Cup France (2014, 2016, 2027)

Former

- 24H Series
  - 12 Hours of Imola (2017–2018)
- Auto GP (1999–2001, 2005–2006, 2010, 2014, 2016)
- BMW M1 Procar Championship (1980)
- BOSS GP (2012, 2014, 2016–2017, 2019–2020)
- Classic Endurance Racing (2011–2013, 2016, 2018)
- Deutsche Tourenwagen Masters (2022)
- DTM Trophy (2022)
- Euroformula Open Championship (2021–2022)
- European Formula Two Championship (1970–1972)
- European Touring Car Championship (1987, 2000, 2004)
- European Touring Car Cup (2012, 2016)
- Ferrari Challenge Europe (2009, 2012–2013, 2015, 2017, 2019–2020)
- FFSA GT Championship (2013)
- FIA European Formula 3 Championship (1977–1978, 1981, 1983)
- FIA Formula 2 Championship
  - Imola Formula 2 round (2022, 2024–2025)
- FIA Formula 3 Championship (2022, 2024–2025)
- FIA Formula 3 European Championship (2014, 2016)
- FIA Formula Two Championship (2009)
- FIA GT Championship (2004–2005)
- FIM Endurance World Championship (1966, 1982, 2002–2003)
- Formula ACI/CSAI Abarth Italian Championship (2005–2006, 2009–2014)
- Formula One
  - Emilia Romagna Grand Prix (2020–2022, 2024–2025)
  - Italian Grand Prix (1980)
  - San Marino Grand Prix (1981–2006)
- Formula Renault 2.0 Alps (2011–2015)
- Formula Renault Eurocup (1996, 1998, 2002, 2004, 2020)
- Formula Renault V6 Eurocup (2004)
- French Formula Renault Championship (1976)
- GP2 Asia Series (2011)
- GP2 Series (2005–2006)
- Grand Prix motorcycle racing
  - City of Imola motorcycle Grand Prix (1996–1999)
  - Italian motorcycle Grand Prix (1969, 1972, 1974–1975, 1977, 1979, 1988)
  - San Marino motorcycle Grand Prix (1981, 1983)
- Imola 200 (1972–1978, 1980–1985)
- International Formula 3000 (1986–1987, 1998–2004)
- International Formula Master (2005, 2008–2009)
- International GT Open (2009–2011, 2021)
- International GTSprint Series (2010, 2012–2013)
- Intercontinental Le Mans Cup
  - 6 Hours of Imola (2011)
- Italian Formula Renault Championship (2000–2006, 2009)
- Italian Formula Three Championship (1970–1979, 1981–2006, 2009–2012)
- Lamborghini Super Trofeo World Finals (2017)
- Le Mans Cup (2016, 2022)
- Ligier European Series (2022)
- Motocross World Championship (2019–2020)
- Porsche Supercup (1993–2006, 2022, 2024–2025)
- Renault Sport Trophy (2016)
- SEAT León Eurocup (2009)
- Sidecar World Championship (1974, 1983, 2001–2003)
- Superbike World Championship (2001–2006, 2009–2019, 2023)
- Supersport World Championship (2001–2006, 2009–2019, 2023)
- Superstars Series (2004–2006, 2009–2010, 2012–2013)
- TCR International Series (2016)
- Trofeo Maserati (2004–2005)
- World Sportscar Championship (1965, 1974, 1984)
- World Touring Car Championship (2005, 2008–2009)
  - FIA WTCC Race of Europe (2008)
  - FIA WTCC Race of Italy (2009)
  - FIA WTCC Race of San Marino (2005)

== Non-motorsport events ==
Since 1981, the circuit has been hosting the early-September Mostra Scambio ("Trading Exposition"), an open-air market primarily focused on the exhibition and trade of vintage vehicles and their parts; this event is also popularly (but inaccurately) called CRAME, after the name of the historical society organizing it. The 2020 edition was cancelled due to the COVID-19.

Among the major musical performances held on the track were:

- Heineken Jammin' Festival (1998–2006)
- Sonisphere (2011)
- AC/DC – Rock or Bust World Tour (2015)
- Laura Pausini – Pausini Stadi (2016)
- Guns N' Roses – Not in this Lifetime Tour (2017)
- Mario Biondi (2019)
- Pearl Jam – Gigaton Tour (2022)

Partially due to the vicinity of the Romeo Galli athletics stadium, the Acque Minerali park, and the Tre Monti hills, the Autodromo is not commonly used for bicycle or on-foot sporting activities (albeit with notable exceptions, such as two segments of the Giro d'Italia in the 2010s, and 2020 UCI Road World Championships); however, the civic administration does occasionally allocate summer days in which the public can walk or cycle along the track.

== Lap records ==
The official lap record for the current Grand Prix circuit layout is 1:15.484, set by Lewis Hamilton during the 2020 Emilia Romagna Grand Prix, while the unofficial all-time track record is 1:13.609, set by Valtteri Bottas in the qualifying of aforementioned race. As of July 2026, the fastest official race lap records at the Imola Circuit are listed as:

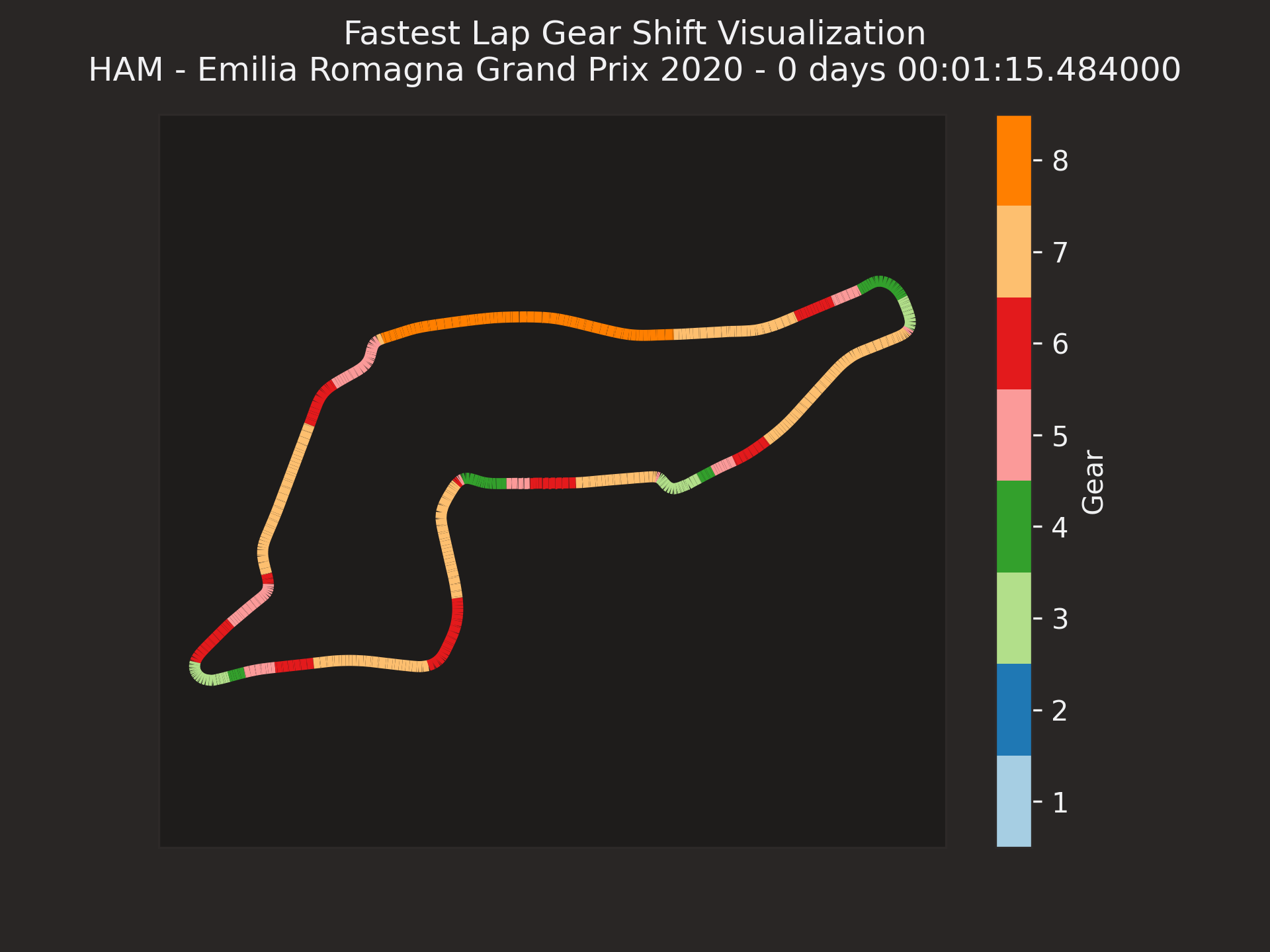

Category	Time	Driver	Vehicle	Event
Grand Prix Circuit (2008–present): 4.909 km (3.050 mi)
F1	1:15.484	Lewis Hamilton	Mercedes-AMG F1 W11 EQ Performance	2020 Emilia Romagna Grand Prix
GP2 Asia	1:28.097	Romain Grosjean	Dallara GP2/11	2011 Imola GP2 Asia Series round
FIA F2	1:28.353	Jehan Daruvala	Dallara F2 2018	2022 Imola Formula 2 round
LMP2	1:31.757	Arthur Leclerc	Oreca 07	2024 4 Hours of Imola
LMH	1:31.794	Antonio Fuoco	Ferrari 499P	2024 6 Hours of Imola
Auto GP	1:32.189	Kimiya Sato	Lola B05/52	2014 Imola Auto GP round
LMDh	1:32.258	Victor Martins	Alpine A424	2026 6 Hours of Imola
LMP1	1:33.112	Sébastien Bourdais	Peugeot 908	2011 6 Hours of Imola
FIA F3	1:33.129	Roman Staněk	Dallara F3 2019	2022 Imola Formula 3 round
Euroformula Open	1:35.273	Jak Crawford	Dallara 320	2021 Imola Euroformula Open round
Eurocup-3	1:35.964	James Egozi	Dallara 326	2026 Imola Eurocup-3 round
LMP3	1:38.235	Laurents Hörr	Duqueine M30-D08	2022 Imola Le Mans Cup round
FTwo (2009–2012)	1:38.576	Robert Wickens	Williams JPH1	2009 Imola Formula Two round
Formula Regional	1:38.769	Hadrien David	Tatuus F3 T-318	2021 Imola FREC round
Renault Sport Trophy	1:39.784	Pieter Schothorst	Renault Sport R.S. 01	2016 Imola Renault Sport Trophy round
Lamborghini Super Trofeo	1:39.827	Loris Spinelli	Lamborghini Huracán Super Trofeo Evo2	2022 Imola Lamborghini Super Trofeo Europe round
International Formula Master	1:39.946	Fabio Leimer	Tatuus N.T07	2009 Imola Formula Master round
GT3	1:40.375	Nicki Thiim	Aston Martin Vantage AMR GT3	2022 Imola GT World Challenge Europe round
LM GTE	1:41.024	Matthew Griffin	Ferrari 458 Italia GT2	2014 4 Hours of Imola
Group CN	1:41.379	Giorgio Mondini	Ligier JS53 Evo	2015 Imola Italian Sport Prototypes Championship round
Ferrari Challenge	1:41.681	Giacomo Altoè	Ferrari 296 Challenge	2024 Imola Ferrari Challenge Europe round
Formula Renault 2.0	1:42.423	Anthoine Hubert	Tatuus FR2.0/13	2015 Imola Formula Renault 2.0 Alps round
Porsche Carrera Cup	1:43.221	Aldo Festante	Porsche 911 (992 II) Cup	2026 Imola Porsche Carrera Cup Germany round
SRO GT2	1:43.486	Anders Fjordbach	Brabham BT63 GT2 Concept	2022 Imola GT2 European Series round
Formula Abarth	1:44.035	Luca Ghiotto	Tatuus FA010	2012 Imola Formula Abarth round
Formula 4	1:44.280	Ugo Ugochukwu	Tatuus F4-T421	2023 Imola Italian F4 round
LMPC	1:44.443	Kyle Marcelli	Oreca FLM09	2011 6 Hours of Imola
JS P4	1:47.027	Dimitri Enjalbert	Ligier JS P4	2022 Imola Ligier European Series round
GT4	1:49.524	Tom Canning	Aston Martin Vantage AMR GT4	2022 Imola GT4 European Series round
TCR Touring Car	1:51.384	Nicolas Taylor	Audi RS 3 LMS TCR (2021)	2025 Imola TCR Italy round
JS2 R	1:52.529	Manuel Quondamcarlo	Ligier JS2 R	2025 Imola X-GT4 Supersport GT round
Super 2000	1:53.801	Petr Fulín	SEAT León Cup Racer	2016 Imola ETC round
Renault Clio Cup	2.03.093	Felice Jelmini	Renault Clio R.S. IV	2019 2nd Imola Renault Clio Cup Italy round
Super 1600	2:10.140	Niklas Mackschin	Ford Fiesta 1.6 16V	2016 Imola ETC round
Eurocup Mégane Trophy	2:12.581	Michele Bartyan	Renault Mégane RS Trophy	2011 500 Miglia di Imola
Motorcycle Circuit (2009–present): 4.936 km (3.067 mi)
World SBK	1:45.727	Chaz Davies	Ducati Panigale V4 R	2019 Imola World SBK round
World SSP	1:51.101	Jules Cluzel	MV Agusta F3 675	2015 Imola World SSP round
Sportbike	1:57.009	Bruno Ieraci	Triumph Daytona 660	2025 Imola CIV Sportbike round
Supersport 300	2:05.669	Mattia Martella	Kawasaki Ninja 400	2023 Imola CIV SSP 300 round
Grand Prix Circuit (1995–2006): 4.959 km (3.081 mi)
F1	1:20.411	Michael Schumacher	Ferrari F2004	2004 San Marino Grand Prix
GP2	1:33.871	Nicolas Lapierre	Dallara GP2/05	2005 Imola GP2 Series round
F3000	1:38.936	Giorgio Pantano	Lola B02/50	2002 Imola F3000 round
Formula Renault 3.5	1:44.420	Christian Montanari	Tatuus FRV6	2004 Imola Formula Renault V6 Eurocup round
F3	1:47.137	Valerio Scassellati	Dallara F399	2000 Imola Italian F3 round
GT1 (GTS)	1:47.399	Uwe Alzen	Saleen S7-R	2004 FIA GT Imola 500 km
World SBK	1:48.389	Troy Bayliss	Ducati 998 F02	2002 Imola World SBK round
Formula Renault 2.0	1:49.372	Kamui Kobayashi	Tatuus FR2000	2005 Imola Renault 2.0 Italia round
500cc	1:49.436	Mick Doohan	Honda NSR500	1997 City of Imola motorcycle Grand Prix
250cc	1:51.872	Tetsuya Harada	Aprilia RSV 250	1997 City of Imola motorcycle Grand Prix
N-GT	1:52.425	Lucas Luhr	Porsche 911 (996) GT3-RSR	2004 FIA GT Imola 500 km
GT2	1:52.567	Emmanuel Collard	Porsche 911 (996) GT3-RSR	2005 FIA GT Imola Supercar 500
World SSP	1:53.122	Kevin Curtain	Yamaha YZF-R6	2003 Imola World SSP round
FIA GT Group-2	1:54.647	Shaun Balfe	Mosler MT900R	2005 FIA GT Imola Supercar 500
Super Touring	1:55.737	Emanuele Naspetti	BMW 320i	1999 Imola Italian Superturismo round
Porsche Carrera Cup	1:56.928	Richard Westbrook	Porsche 911 (997) GT3 Cup	2005 Imola Porsche Supercup round
Formula Azzurra	1:57.852	Davide Rigon	Gloria B5-10Y	2005 Imola Formula Azzurra round
SEAT León Eurocup	1:58.307	Fredy Barth	SEAT León Supercopa	2009 Imola SEAT León Eurocup round
125cc	1:58.490	Valentino Rossi	Aprilia RS125R	1997 City of Imola motorcycle Grand Prix
Super 2000	1:59.756	Fabrizio Giovanardi	Alfa Romeo 156 GTA Super 2000	2004 Imola ETCC round
Grand Prix Circuit (1980–1994): 5.040 km (3.132 mi)
F1	1:24.335	Damon Hill	Williams FW16	1994 San Marino Grand Prix
Group C	1:37.840	Pierluigi Martini	Lancia LC2	1984 1000 km of Imola
F3000	1:38.290	Gabriele Tarquini	March 87B	1987 Imola F3000 round
F3	1:45.429	Luca Badoer	Dallara F391	1991 Imola Italian F3 round
Group A	1:51.799	Antonio Tamburini	Alfa Romeo 155 GTA	1992 Imola Italian Superturismo round
500cc	1:53.360	Kenny Roberts	Yamaha YZR500	1983 San Marino motorcycle Grand Prix
GT1	1:54.254	Marco Brand	Ferrari F40	1993 Imola Italian GT round
BMW M1 Procar	1:54.768	Nelson Piquet	BMW M1 Procar	1980 Imola BMW M1 Procar round
Super Touring	1:58.079	Fabrizio Giovanardi	Peugeot 405 Mi16	1993 Imola Italian Superturismo round
250cc	2:03.130	Anton Mang	Kawasaki KR250	1981 San Marino motorcycle Grand Prix
125cc	2:06.030	Angel Nieto	Garelli 125 GP	1983 San Marino motorcycle Grand Prix
50cc	2:21.420	Ricardo Tormo	Morbidelli 50	1983 San Marino motorcycle Grand Prix
Original Grand Prix Circuit with Variante Alta and Variante Bassa (1973–1979): 5.060 km (3.144 mi)
F1	1:33.610	Gilles Villeneuve	Ferrari 312 T4	1979 Dino Ferrari Grand Prix
Group 7	1:34.900	George Follmer	Porsche 917/10 TC	1973 Coppa Orro di Shell Imola
Group 5	1:40.800	Jean-Pierre Jarier	Matra-Simca MS670	1974 1000 km of Imola
Group 6	1:42.300	Jean-Pierre Jarier	Renault Alpine A442	1976 500 km of Imola
F3	1:47.800	Michele Alboreto	March 793	1979 Imola Italian F3 round
500cc	1:56.000	Kenny Roberts	Yamaha YZR500	1979 Nations motorcycle Grand Prix
350cc	1:59.300	Kork Ballington	Kawasaki KR350	1979 Nations motorcycle Grand Prix
250cc	2:01.400	Kork Ballington	Kawasaki KR250	1979 Nations motorcycle Grand Prix
125cc	2:08.500	Thierry Espié	Motobécane 125	1979 Nations motorcycle Grand Prix
50cc	2:24.500	Eugenio Lazzarini	Kreidler 50 GP	1979 Nations motorcycle Grand Prix
Original Grand Prix Circuit (1953–1972): 5.017 km (3.117 mi)
Group 7	1:27.700	Helmut Marko	BRM P167	1972 Imola Interserie round
F2	1:31.900	Peter Gethin	Chevron B20	1972 Imola F2 round
Group 6	1:36.900	Jacky Ickx	Mirage M3/300	1969 500 km of Imola
Group 4	1:41.700	Frank Gardner	Lola T70 Mk IIIB GT	1969 500 km of Imola
F3	1:42.300	Sandro Cinotti	Brabham BT35C	1972 1st Imola Italian F3 round
F1	1:48.300	Trevor Taylor	Lotus 25	1963 Imola Grand Prix
500cc	1:48.800	Giacomo Agostini	MV Agusta 500 3C	1972 Nations motorcycle Grand Prix
350cc	1:49.700	Giacomo Agostini	MV Agusta 350 4C	1972 Nations motorcycle Grand Prix
250cc	1:52.200	Renzo Pasolini	Aermacchi 250	1972 Nations motorcycle Grand Prix
125cc	1:58.300	Gilberto Parlotti	Morbidelli 125	1972 Nations motorcycle Grand Prix
Group 3	2:04.100	Herbert Demetz	Abarth Simca 1300 GT	1965 Gran Premio Shell Coppa Bologna
50cc	2:14.400	Jan de Vries	Kreidler 50 GP	1972 Nations motorcycle Grand Prix

== Fatal accidents ==
- Sauro Pazzaglia – 1981 San Marino motorcycle Grand Prix (Qualifying)
- Roland Ratzenberger – 1994 San Marino Grand Prix (Qualifying)
- Ayrton Senna – 1994 San Marino Grand Prix (Race)
