= AVS Shadow =

American sports prototype racing cars

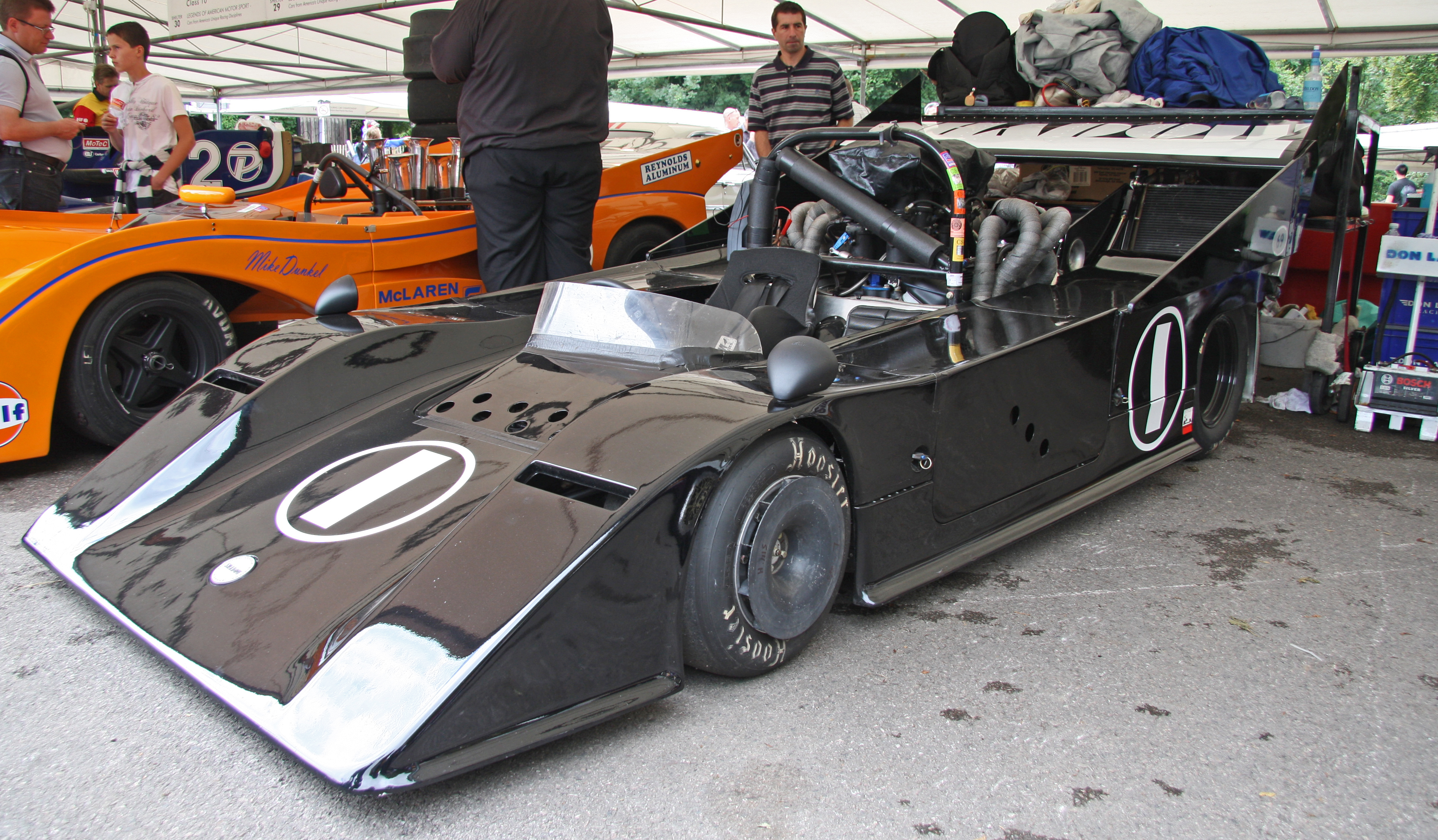
- Category: Can-Am (Group 7)
- Constructor: Shadow
- Designer: Trevor Harris
- Production: 1969-1970
- Successor: Shadow Mk.II

Technical specifications
- Chassis: Aluminum monocoque with Honeycomb-reinforced Fiberglass panels
- Suspension (front): Double wishbone, coil springs over friction dampers, anti-roll bar
- Suspension (rear): Double wishbone, coil springs over friction dampers, anti-roll bar
- Width: 82.5 in (209.6 cm)
- Axle track: 60 in (152.4 cm) (Front); 56 in (142.2 cm) (Rear)
- Wheelbase: 86 in (218.4 cm)
- Engine: Chevrolet 8,095 cc (494 cu in) V8 engine naturally aspirated mid-engined
- Transmission: Hewland L.G.500 4-speed or L.G.600 5-speed manual
- Power: 740 hp (550 kW); 655 lb⋅ft (888 N⋅m) of torque
- Weight: 1,799 lb (816.0 kg)
- Tyres: Goodyear

Competition history
- Notable entrants: Advanced Vehicle Systems
- Notable drivers: (United Kingdom) Jackie Oliver
- Debut: 1970 Can-Am Mosport
Entries	Wins	Podiums
10	0	0

The AVS Shadow, also known as the Shadow Mk.I, is a purpose-built sports prototype race car, designed, developed and built by Shadow Racing Cars to Group 7 racing specifications, specifically to compete in the Can-Am racing series, in 1970. It was Shadow's first Can-Am car. Powered by a naturally aspirated, Chevrolet big-block engine, developing 740 hp (550 kW), and 655 lb⋅ft (888 N⋅m) of torque.
