= Motorsports Hall of Fame =

There are numerous Motorsports Hall of Fames:

- Auto Racing Hall of Fame - United States
- Canadian Motorsport Hall of Fame - Canada
- FIA Hall of Fame - Global
- International Motorsports Hall of Fame - autoracers from around the world
- Motorcycle Hall of Fame - United States
- Motorsports Hall of Fame of America - United States
- NASCAR Hall of Fame - United States
- National Dirt Late Model Hall of Fame - United States
- National Midget Auto Racing Hall of Fame - United States
- National Sprint Car Hall of Fame & Museum - United States
- Off-road Motorsports Hall of Fame - off-road racers from around the world
- SCCA Hall of Fame - Sports Car Club of America, United States

== See also ==
- List of halls and walks of fame
