= BRM P167 =

American sports prototype racing cars

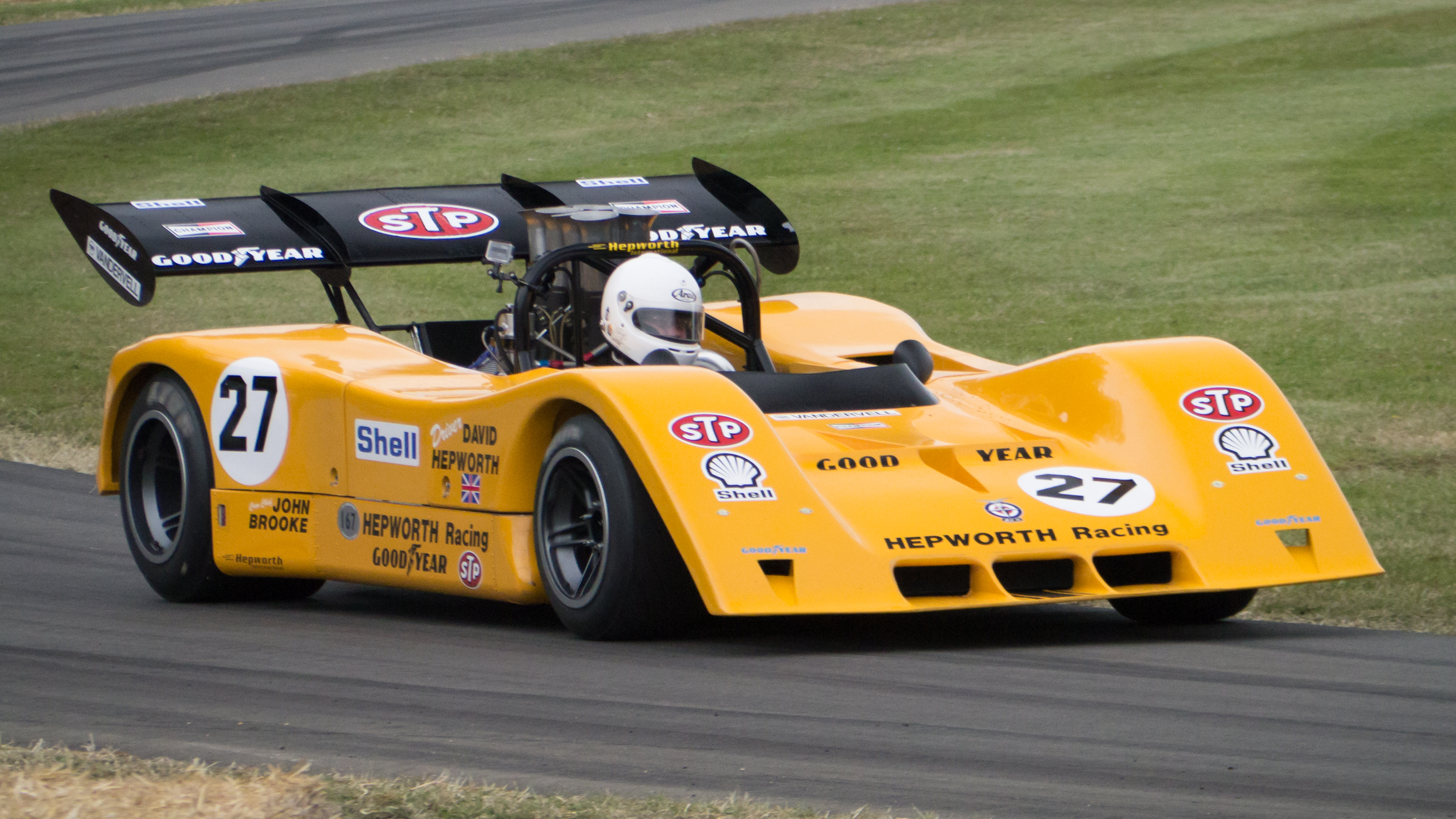
- Category: Can-Am (Group 7)
- Constructor: BRM
- Designer(s): Tony Southgate
- Production: 1971–1972
- Predecessor: BRM P154

Technical specifications
- Chassis: Fiberglass body with Aluminium Monocoque
- Suspension (front): Double wishbone, Coil springs over Friction Dampers, Anti-roll bar
- Suspension (rear): Reversed lower wishbones, top link, Radius arms, Coil springs over Friction Dampers, Anti-roll bar
- Wheelbase: 93 in (236.2 cm)
- Engine: Chevrolet 90° 7,481 cc (457 cu in) V8 engine naturally aspirated mid-engined
- Transmission: Hewland L.G.500 4-speed manual
- Power: 600 hp (447 kW); 590 lb⋅ft (800 N⋅m)
- Weight: 1,709 lb (775.2 kg)
- Tyres: Firestone

Competition history
- Notable entrants: Castrol Team BRM
- Notable drivers: (New Zealand) Howden Ganley (United Kingdom) Brian Redman
- Debut: 1971 Can-Am Mosport

The BRM P167 is a purpose-built sports prototype race car, designed, developed and built by British Racing Motors to Group 7 racing specifications, specifically to compete in the Can-Am racing series, between 1971. It was BRM's final Can-Am race car chassis. It was powered by a naturally aspirated, Chevrolet big-block engine, developing a solid 600 hp (450 kW).
