= Brabham BT17 =

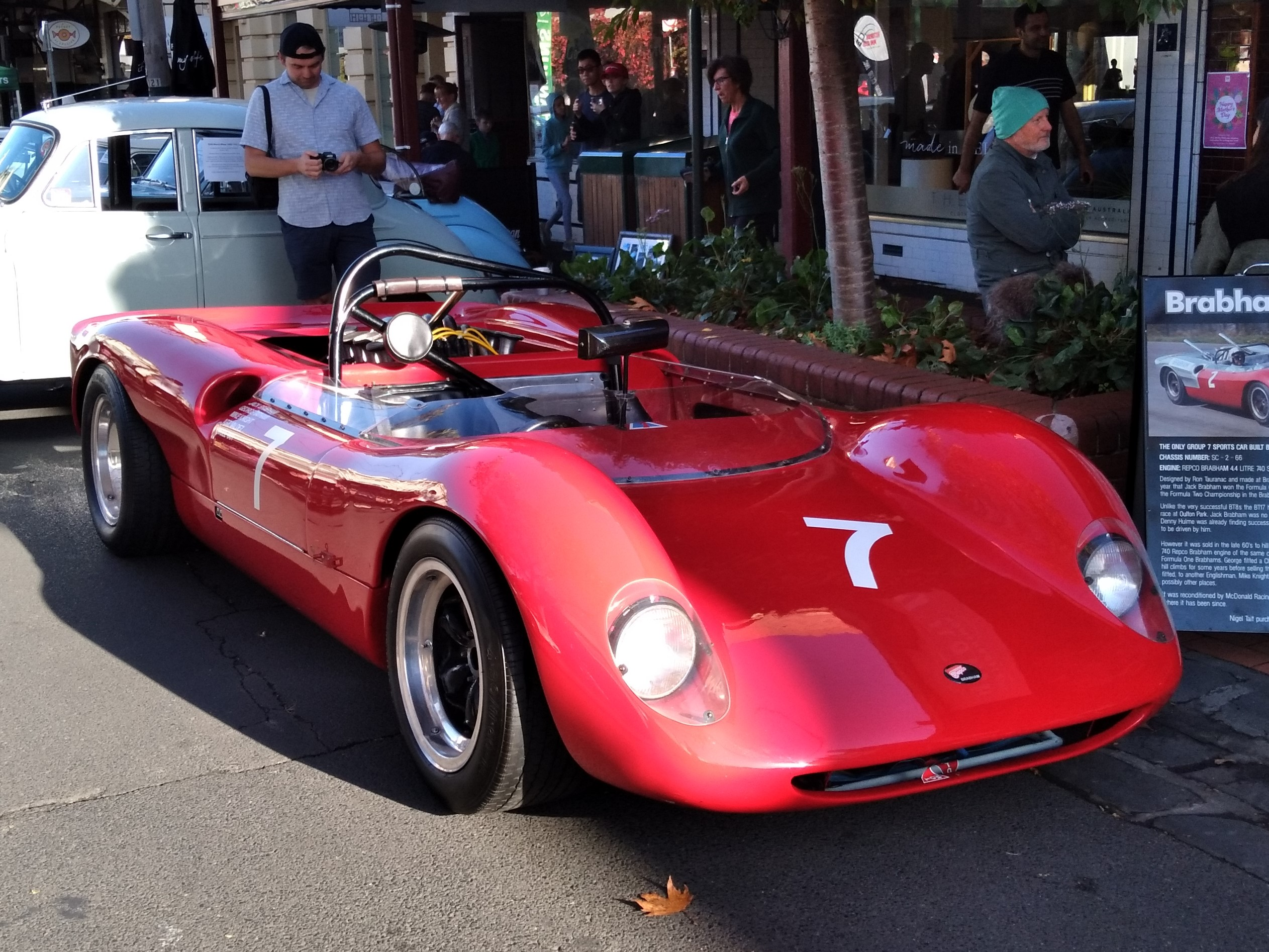
- Category: Group 7
- Constructor: Brabham
- Designer: Ron Tauranac
- Production: 1966; 1 car built

Technical specifications
- Chassis: Steel tubular spaceframe
- Engine: Mid-engine, longitudinally mounted, 3.0–4.3 L (183.1–262.4 cu in), Repco RB620, 90° V8, SOHC, NA
- Transmission: Hewland 6-speed manual
- Power: ~ 315–350 hp (235–261 kW)
- Tyres: Goodyear

Competition history
- Debut: 1966

The Brabham BT17 was a one-off sports prototype race car, designed by British-Australian engineer Ron Tauranac, and developed and built by British manufacturer, constructor, and Formula One racing team, Brabham. It was built to Group 7 racing specifications, in 1966, and was the only Group 7 sports car built by Brabham. Only one single model was produced. It only contested three sports car races, scoring no wins, podiums, pole positions, or points finishes.

It was also notably the last sports car to bear the Brabham name for 52 years, until the Brabham BT62 was introduced, in 2018. It was initially powered by a 4.3 L (260 cu in) Repco-Brabham V8 engine, however, due to reliability problems with the original engine, the engine was swapped with a smaller 3.0 L (180 cu in) Repco 620 V8 engine, producing 315 hp (235 kW), and drove the rear wheels via a Hewland 5-speed manual transmission.
