= BRM P154 =

American sports prototype racing cars

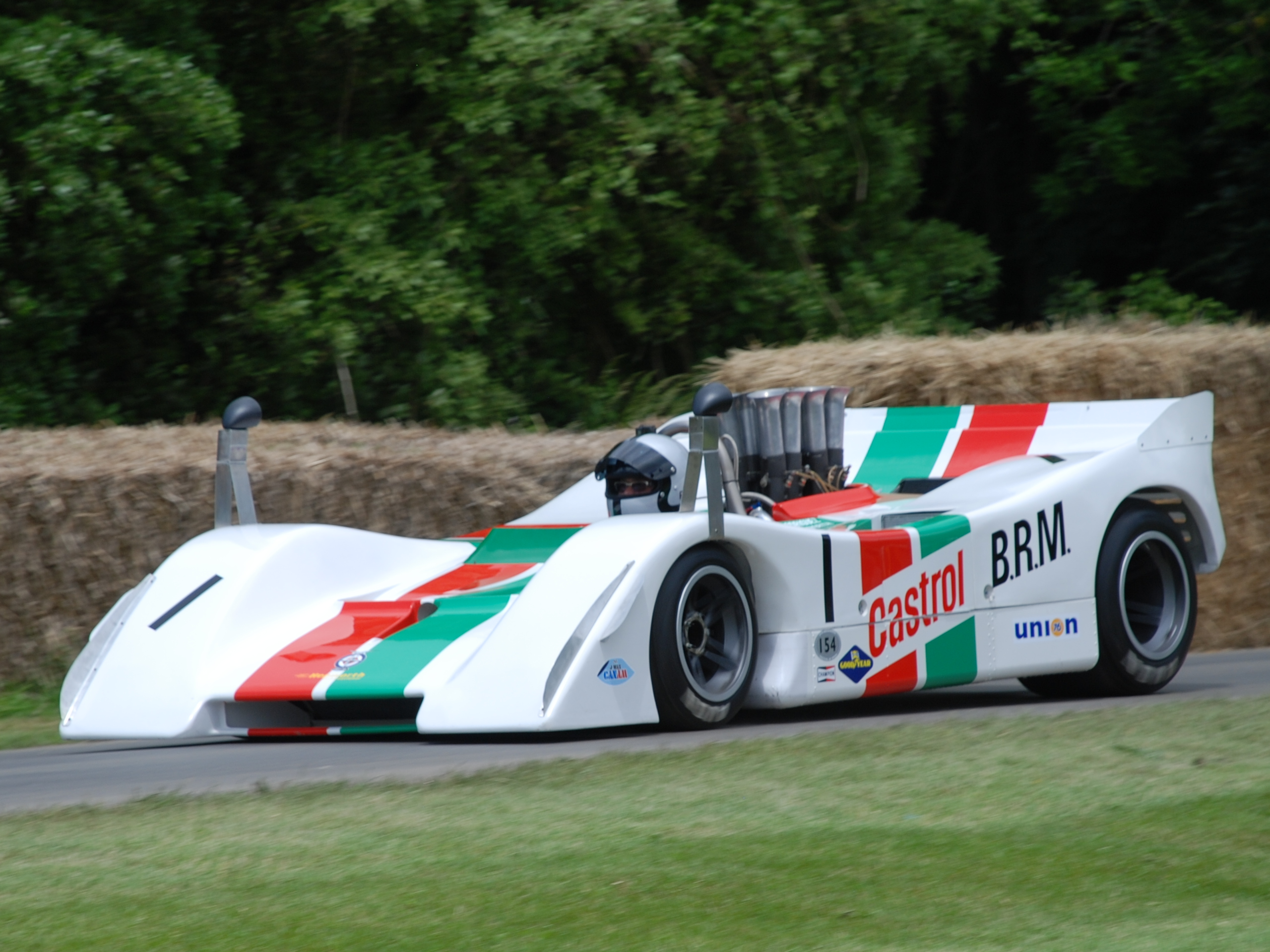
- Category: Can-Am (Group 7)
- Constructor: BRM
- Designer(s): Tony Southgate
- Production: 1970
- Successor: BRM P167

Technical specifications
- Chassis: Glass-fibre reinforced plastic with aluminium monocoque and fully stress engine
- Suspension (front): Double wishbone, Coil springs over Friction Dampers, Anti-roll bar
- Suspension (rear): Reversed lower wishbones, top link, twin trailing arms, Coil springs over Friction Dampers, Anti-roll bar
- Wheelbase: 93 in (236.2 cm)
- Engine: Chevrolet 7,620–8,000 cc (465–488 cu in) V8 engine naturally aspirated mid-engined
- Transmission: Hewland L.G.500 4-speed manual
- Power: 760 hp (570 kW); 650 lb⋅ft (880 N⋅m) of torque
- Weight: 1,543 lb (699.9 kg)
- Tyres: Firestone

Competition history
- Notable entrants: Castrol Team BRM
- Notable drivers: (Mexico) Pedro Rodríguez
- Debut: 1970 Can-Am Mosport

The BRM P154 is a purpose-built sports prototype race car, designed, developed and built by British Racing Motors to Group 7 racing specifications, specifically to compete in the Can-Am racing series, in 1970. It was BRM's first Can-Am car. It is powered by a naturally aspirated, Chevrolet big-block engine, developing 760 hp (570 kW), and 650 lb⋅ft (880 N⋅m) of torque.
