= SCCA Hall of Fame =

The SCCA Hall of Fame is a Hall of Fame dedicated to enshrining those who have contributed the most to the Sports Car Club of America (SCCA) auto racing.

The Hall of Fame was announced in 2004, and the first 10 people were inducted in 2005.

== List of inductees ==
=== 2005 ===
- Cameron Argetsinger
- A. Tracy Bird
- John Fitch
- Arthur Gervais
- Harry Handley
- Vern Jaques
- Bill Milliken
- Sue Roethel
- Art Trier
- Rob Walker

=== 2006 ===
- John Bornholdt
- John Buffum
- Mark Donohue
- Denise McCluggage
- Grant Reynolds
- Anthony DeMonte

=== 2007 ===
- Marge Binks
- Marc Gerstein
- Carl Haas
- General Curtis E. LeMay
- Theodore F. Robinson

=== 2008 ===
- Don and Ruth Nixon
- Roger Johnson
- Kjell Qvale
- Robert Ridges
- Fred Schmucker

=== 2009 ===
- Bill Chambres
- Bill Johnson
- Jim Kimberly
- Paul Newman
- John Timanus

=== 2010 ===
- Nick Craw
- Briggs Cunningham
- Woolf Barnato
- Burdette “Berdie” Martin
- Wayne Zitkus

=== 2011 ===
- Karen Babb
- John Bishop
- Jim Fitzgerald
- Tracer Racing
- Harro Zitza

=== 2012 ===
- Charlie Earwood
- Jim Hall
- Gene Henderson
- Dr. Peter Talbot
- Bryan Webb

=== 2013 ===
- Skip Barber
- Bill Noble
- Bobby Rahal
- Carroll Shelby
- Andy Porterfield

=== 2014 ===
- Kathy Barnes
- Bob Bondurant
- Dan Gurney
- Dr. Robert Hubbard and Jim Downing
- Pete Hylton

=== 2015 ===
- Roger H. Johnson
- Oscar Koveleski
- Ron Sharp
- Dr. George Snively
- Bob Tullius

=== 2016 ===
- Hubert Brundage
- Bob Henderson
- Randy Pobst
- Roger Penske
- Alec Ulmann

=== 2017 ===
- Pete Brock
- Dennis Dean
- Larry and Linda Dent
- Phil Hill
- Joe Huffaker Sr.
- Jim Kaser
- Lyn St. James

=== 2018 ===
- William C. Bradshaw
- Peter Cunningham
- Janet Guthrie
- Augie Pabst
- Dave Stremming and Loren Pearson
- Bob Sharp
- Dr. Dick Thompson

=== 2019 ===
- David Ammen
- Dr. Frank Falkner
- George Follmer
- Patc Henry
- John McGill
- Dorsey Schroeder
- Henryk Szamota

=== 2020 ===
- Bill and Jane Goodale
- Walt Hansgen
- Scott Harvey Sr.
- Joe Huffaker
- Cat Kizer
- Bob and Patty Tunnell
- Dave and Sherrie Weitzenhof

=== 2021 ===
- Tom Campbell
- John Fergus
- R. Bruce Gezon
- Lloyd Loring
- Donna Mae Mims

=== 2022 ===
- Charlie Clark
- Howard Duncan
- Paul Pfanner
- Greg Pickett
- Mark Weber

=== 2023 ===
- Costa and Wilma Dunias
- Robert “Rocky” Entriken Jr.
- Jim Jeffords
- Kent and Kathy Prather
- Bill Scott

=== 2024 ===
- Anatoly Arutunoff
- Bruce Foss
- Victoria "Vicki" O'Connor
- Terry Ozment
- Fred Wacker Jr.

=== 2025 ===
- Raleigh and Velma Boreen
- Miles and Sam Collier
- Bob Dowie
- Alex Keller
- Ken Miles

=== 2026 ===
- George Bovis
- John Doonan
- Don Knowles
- Frank Schultheis
- Jerry Wannarka
