= Oscar Koveleski =

- Nationality: (United States) American
- Born: Andrew Michael Oscar Koveleski; November 29, 1932 Moosic, Pennsylvania, United States
- Died: December 28, 2020 (aged 88) Clarks Summit, Pennsylvania, United States

Previous series
- 1969–1972: Can-Am Challenge Cup

Championship titles
- 1970: SCCA A Sports Racer National Champion

Awards
- 1983: SCCA Woolf Barnato Award

Andrew Michael Oscar Koveleski (November 29, 1932 — December 28, 2020) was an American entrepreneur and racing driver. He founded the Auto World mail order catalog in 1954 for sales of model cars, slot cars, and radio-controlled cars while also competing in amateur Sports Car Club of America (SCCA) races in Pennsylvania before winning his first SCCA National Championship Runoffs in 1970. He became a regular competitor in the Can-Am Challenge Cup from 1969–1972, driving the Auto World XLR, with a best finish of fourth place. Koveleski also co-founded the Polish Racing Drivers of America, a tongue-in-cheek club, with Tony Adamowicz and Brad Niemcek; the trio participated in the first Cannonball Baker Sea-to-Shining-Sea Memorial Trophy Dash in 1971. SCCA later awarded him the Woolf Barnato Award in 1983 and was selected for their Hall of Fame in 2015.

== Early life ==
Oscar Koveleski was born in 1932 in Moosic, Pennsylvania. His father opened a hobby store in Scranton, Pennsylvania in 1939 before serving as a flight instructor in the Air Transport Command during World War II. Oscar worked at the store during the war, during which he also learned to become a pilot. After the war his father opened a second business manufacturing die-cast models and later plastic kits. Koveleski began auto racing in 1950 at the age of 18 after extensively modifying an MG TC, winning his first race the following year in Pittson as part of the SCCA Philadelphia Region. He married Elaine Ivanik in 1951. He later served in the United States Army during the Korean War as a combat environment field instructor for Mobile Army Surgical Hospital (MASH) units. A rollover while riding in a Jeep left him with back injuries after his service.

== Auto World ==
In 1958, Koveleski and business partner Bob Smith founded Auto World in Smith's basement in Scranton. Koveleski cashed his life insurance policy for the US$300 to start the company. Auto World was an annual mail order catalog for model cars and slot cars, and later began selling early radio-controlled cars. Smith was permanently disabled on crutches while Koveleski's back injury left him bedridden for long periods, allowing the two of them to work on a catalog without requiring a storefront in the early years. Their first ad was in Hot Rod magazine in 1959. Koveleski later joined with Larry Shaw and Bob MacLeod in 1962 to launch Car Model magazine, at which time Auto World had over 3,000 subscribers. In 1988, Koveleski created Kidracer, battery-powered karts mimicking Formula One cars for children to drive, and hosted events at major American auto racing circuits to teach children how to race safely. Koveleski stepped away from the company in the early 1980s to pursue interests in the motorsport world, and Auto World issued its last catalog in 1991 as the slot car market shrank in popularity. The naming rights were eventually sold in the mid-2000s to Round 2 and is now used as a brand of diecast models and slot cars, as well as an online store front.

== Racing career ==
After Koveleski's post-war back issues were corrected, he returned to racing in 1959, purchasing a used Ferrari 857 S. The car's inline-4 cylinder engine was considered tired by this time, so his mechanic replaced it with a Chevrolet V8 engine. During this time, Koveleski began numbering his car 54, in honor of the television show Car 54, Where Are You? After three years of competition from 1962 to 1965, he sold it for a profit to artist Andy Warhol. He also drove a Cooper Monaco and Lotus 23 during this time, participating in SCCA regional and United States Road Racing Championship events before partnering with Hal Keck to co-drive a Shelby Cobra 427, winning the 1965 Watkins Glen 500 then sharing the same car at the inaugural 24 Hours of Daytona in 1966.

In 1969, Koveleski bought a McLaren M6B show car from Teddy Mayer and a Traco-built Chevrolet 327 with the express interest of joining the Can-Am Challenge Cup, and entered the car as the Auto World XLR and finishing seventh on his debut at Mosport and eighth at Road America. He followed this in 1970 by purchasing the McLaren M8B that Bruce McLaren had used to win the 1969 championship. The car, still in McLaren's Papaya Orange color, was painted with a slot car track around its bodywork and Auto World sponsorship. His promotional efforts later led the Can-Am series to limit the amount of advertising allowed on the cars. Koveleski scored his best Can-Am finish, fourth, at Road Atlanta. Koveleski did not have a spare motor or gearbox for the car, and his crew consisted of his mechanic Jack Degen, Degen's girlfriend, and his own wife, Elaine. The McLaren M8B was also used in the SCCA National Championship Runoffs at the end of 1970, beating Jerry Hansen to the finish by one-tenth of a second.

During 1970, Koveleski partnered with Tony Adamowicz, who also competed in Can-Am, and Brad Niemcek, an amateur racer and S. C. Johnson & Son's public relations with the Can-Am series they sponsored, and formed the Polish Racing Drivers of America (PRDA), built around the concept of Polish jokes and self-depreciation. Koveleski was named president-for-life due to his ability to publicize the group through Auto World and because he was known as "the clown prince of Can-Am." Koveleski had become known in the Can-Am series for his antics, including hosting broom riding races for marshals and attaching a spoiler to his racing helmet. The group's guidelines allowed people who were neither Polish nor racing drivers to join. The group mailed parody newsletters, embroidered patches, and membership cards, eventually attracting over 6,000 subscriptions, including actor Paul Newman. The PRDA were also the first team to take on the challenge set by journalist Brock Yates that laid the groundwork for the Cannonball Baker Sea-To-Shining-Sea Memorial Trophy Dash, an illegal road race from New York to Los Angeles. The drivers shared a Chevrolet Sportvan filled with five 55-gallon oil drums to carry enough fuel to complete the 2,800 miles (4,500 km) race. The trio finished second, fifty-three minutes behind the Ferrari 365 GTB/4 of Yates and racing driver Dan Gurney. Koveleski later wished he could forget the race and hoped no one would repeat it.

For 1971, Koveleski handed driving duties in the M8B to Adamowicz after the opening round at Mosport. Adamowicz's best result was third at Mid-Ohio and finishing seventh in the championship standings. As costs in the Can-Am series increased, Koveleski merged his team with Warren Agor's team in 1972, continuing the Auto World sponsorship on the M8B but with Agor's team maintaining the car, achieving a best result of ninth at Road America before the M8B was retired at the end of the season. Koveleski did return to national competition in 1972, sharing a Chevrolet Corvette with Charlie Kemp at the 12 Hours of Sebring and finishing second in the SCCA National Championships with the McLaren.

Koveleski was named to the board of directors of the Motor Racing Safety Society and served on the board of governors of the SCCA while he competed. After withdrawing from Can-Am at the end of 1972, he continued in regional-level racing with occasional entries in major events. He drove his McLaren M6B to win the Giant's Despair Hillclimb six times from 1969 through 1979, including setting the circuit record three times. The M6B was also used in the World Sports Car Championship race at Mosport in 1976 alongside many of the since-retired Can-Am cars. He drove a BMW 3.0 CSL in the 1978 24 Hours of Daytona.

== Retirement ==
Following the end of his driving career, Koveleski served as a promoter of SCCA racing at Pocono Raceway from 1980 through 1996. He served as president of the Historic Can-Am Association, which hosted historic racing events with Can-Am cars. He was awarded the Woolf Barnato Award by the SCCA in 1983 for a lifetime of contributions to the organisation, and was elected into the SCCA Hall of Fame in 2015.

== Motorsports career results ==
=== Complete Can-Am Challenge Cup results ===
(key) (Races in bold indicate pole position) (Races in italics indicate fastest lap)

Year	Team	Car	Engine	1	2	3	4	5	6	7	8	9	10	11	Pos	Pts
1969	Auto World, Inc.	McLaren M6B	Chevrolet	MOS; 7	MTR; Ret	WGL; 11	EDM	MOH; 12	ROA; 8	BRI	MCH	LAG	RIV	TWS	21st	7
1970	Auto World, Inc.	McLaren M8B	Chevrolet	MOS; Ret	MTR; 6	WGL; 12	EDM	MOH; Ret	ROA; Ret	ATL; 4	BRA; 12	LAG	RIV; Ret		15th	16
1971	Auto World, Inc.	McLaren M8B	Chevrolet	MOS; Ret	MTR	ATL	WGL	MOH	ROA	BRA	EDM	LAG	RIV		NC	0
