= Ford G7 =

Ford G7A Ford G7B
- Category: Group 7
- Constructor: Ford
- Designer(s): Roy Lunn

Technical specifications
- Axle track: Front: 55.6 in (1,412 mm); Rear: 54.8 in (1,392 mm)
- Wheelbase: 95 in (2,413 mm)
- Engine: Ford 427 cu in (6,997 cc), 429 cu in (7,030 cc) or 496 cu in (8,128 cc), 16 valve, OHV V8, naturally aspirated, mid-engined
- Transmission: 2-speed automatic
- Power: 610–835 hp (455–623 kW); 540–800 lb⋅ft (732–1,085 N⋅m)
- Weight: 1,900 lb (862 kg)
- Tyres: Firestone; Goodyear

Competition history
- Notable entrants: Agapiou Brothers Racing
- Notable drivers: Peter Revson; John Cannon; George Follmer; Jack Brabham; Lee Roy Yarbrough; Vic Elford
- Debut: 1969 Can-Am Mosport Park
| Races | Wins | Poles | F/Laps |
|---|---|---|---|
| 15 (16 entries) | 0 | 0 | 0 |
- Teams' Championships: 0
- Constructors' Championships: 0
- Drivers' Championships: 0

The Ford G7 is a Can-Am sports racing car that was built by Ford in 1968. Initially fitted with a 427 cu in (6,997 cc) Ford V8 engine, and later using 429 cu in (7,030 cc) and 496 cu in (8,128 cc) versions of the engine, the G7 was extremely unreliable and only ever finished one of the 15 races it competed in. In particular, it had serious issues with overheating and engine problems; the latter of which often prevented the car from even starting a race.

== Design and development ==
In 1968, Ford rebuilt a Mk IV Spyder chassis for Can-Am racing, and produced the G7A. Although the new car used the Mk IV's suspension and brakes, the new bodywork included a rear wing inspired by Jim Hall's Chaparral Can-Am cars. The car used a 2-speed automatic gearbox, and a torque converter from the Mercury and Ford funny cars. Coupled to this transmission was a 427 cu in (6,997 cc) Ford V8 engine, capable of producing around 650 hp (485 kW; 659 PS). However, despite the power output, the car was amongst the heaviest on the grid, weighing in at 1,900 lb (862 kg), and it showed little promise in its first test session; lapping 14 seconds off the lap record in a Las Vegas test. Not only was it off the pace, but the engine proved incredibly fragile and unresponsive in the test; the special blocks were porous, and allowed water to seep into the oil.

== Race history ==
=== 1969 ===
In 1969, Agapiou Brothers Racing purchased the G7A, and attempted to run Peter Revson in the Can-Am season opener, held at Mosport Park; however, in a sign of things to come, the engine failed and he wasn't even able to start the race. It was a similar story at Mont-Tremblant; Revson was unable to start the race. As a result, Revson left the team, and later joined Robbins-Jefferies Racing Team. The G7 was not used in the third round of the Can-Am series, but reappeared again for the next round, held at Edmonton; John Cannon was selected to drive it, but the fuel injectors malfunctioned after just five laps, and forced him to retire. Cannon drove for Young-American in the next round, held at Mid-Ohio, so George Follmer replaced him in the Agapiou Brothers' team; however, the engine failed again and prevented Follmer from starting the race. Follmer tried again at Road America, but couldn't manage more than two laps before the transmission packed up and he retired. The team missed round eight altogether, before initially entering Follmer in the eighth round, held in Michigan; in the end, Jack Brabham drove the G7A, and he lasted 46 laps before he lost a wheel and retired. The team then took a two-race break, before entering the final round of the season, held in Texas; Cannon had returned to the team, but engine problems yet again prevented him from starting the race. Despite the unsuccessful season, the team entered Cannon in the 200 miles of Fuji, and, for the first time ever, the G7A actually completed a race; Cannon finished second, 12.1 seconds behind the winner.

=== 1970 ===
Despite the poor 1969 season, and missing the first two rounds of the 1970 Can-Am season, Agapiou Brothers Racing returned to the series in the Watkins Glen round of the series; the car had a new 429 cu in (7,030 cc) Ford V8 fitted, and was driven once more by John Cannon. However, history repeated itself, as he retired once more; this time, the car overheated after 46 laps. David Hobbs was brought into the team for the next round, held at Edmonton; a water leak after just one lap forced him to retire. An attempt to enter Cannon at Mid-Ohio came to nothing, and this was followed by Cannon retiring from the Road America race after 19 laps; once again, the car had overheated. Lee Roy Yarbrough took the wheel of the G7A at Road Atlanta, but he too suffered an engine failure, this time after 22 laps; even though a new 496 cu in (8,128 cc) V8 had been installed. Despite reverting to the 429 engine, Donnybrooke saw another engine failure, and another failure to start; this time, Vic Elford had been driving. Cannon was back in the cockpit for Laguna Seca Raceway, in the newly updated G7B; the updates made little difference to the car's reliability, and the car overheated after 50 laps, forcing him to retire. At the season finale, held at Riverside, Cannon drove again, but crashed out after 14 laps. This would prove to be the last time a G7 was used in a race.
