= McKee Mk.10 =

The McKee Mk.10, also designated as the McKee Mk.X, is a special purpose-built American sports prototype race car, designed, developed, and built to Group 7 specifications, and competed in the Can-Am series, between 1968 and 1970. It was powered by both an Oldsmobile V8, and a Chevrolet small-block engine.
