= McLaren M12 =

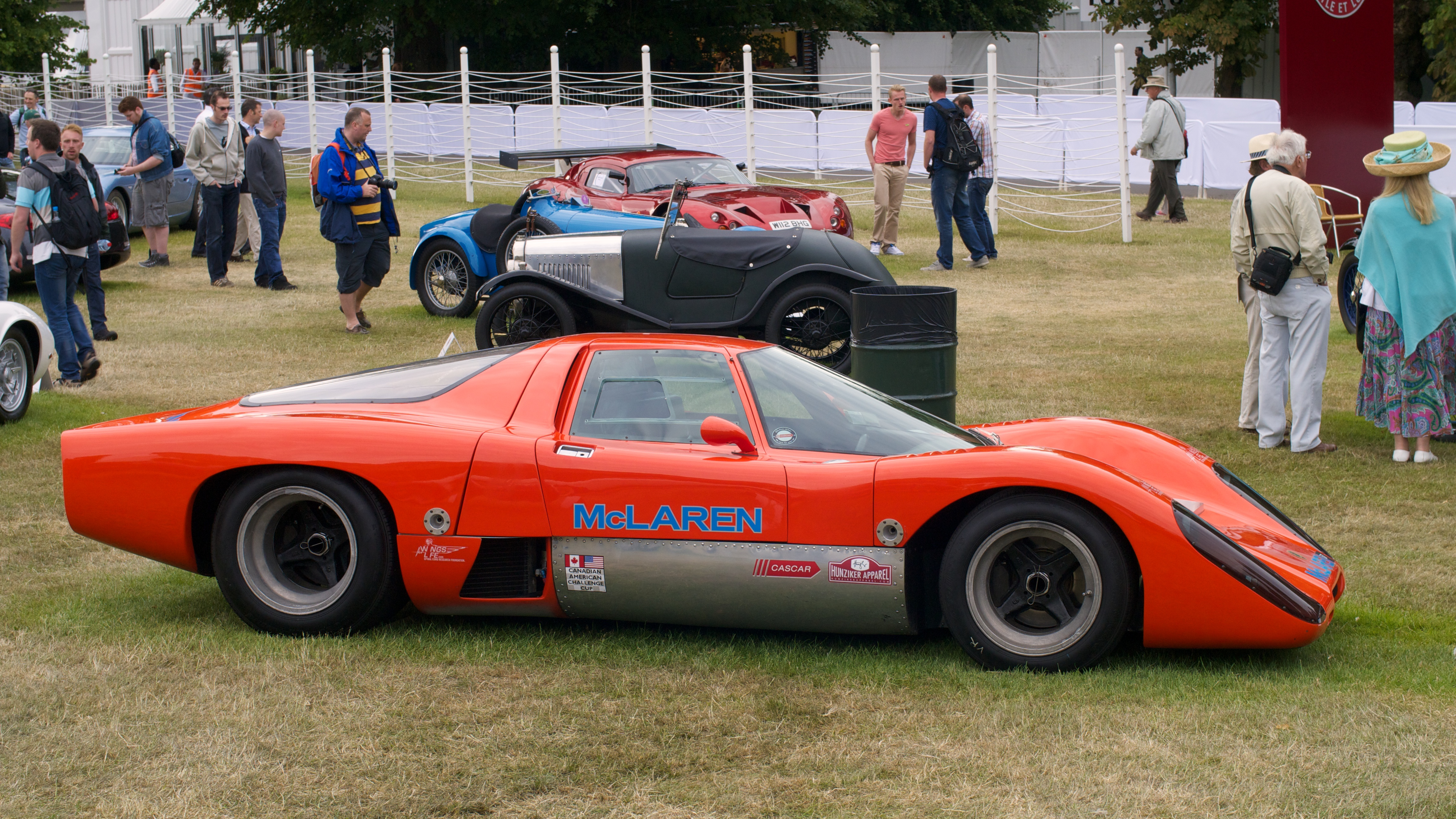
M12 at Goodwood, 2014

The McLaren M12 was an open-cockpit racing car developed by Bruce McLaren Motor Racing in 1969, solely for the purpose of selling to customers in the Can-Am series. The M12 combined elements from two of McLaren's previous efforts, the M6 series and the M8 series.

Chaparral Cars used an M12 in the early 1969 Can-Am season while their own model's development had been delayed.

== Development ==
Per George Eaton, who bought a M12 from McLaren, McLaren told him "the M12's were originally to be built for an assault on LeMans". The cars were developed to take the M6GT Coupe bodywork. Parts on the M12's had M6GT cast directly into the uprights. Unfortunately, the FIA did not accept the M12 under homologation rules so McLaren was forced to abandon the project. Since they had many monocoque chassis' already built, the plans were changed for the M12 to be a roadster and sell them as customer cars for the CanAm series.

M12s were intended as McLaren's first customer cars based on the M8As which the team had successfully used to win the 1968 Can-Am season, as well as the M8Bs which the team were developing for 1969. However, the M12s did not share everything from the M8 series. Instead, the monocoque chassis were actually based on the early M6 series initially developed in 1967. On top of this chassis, the aerodynamic bodywork of the M8A was added. The engine bays were specifically designed to house a Chevrolet V8 engine, but several customers opted for other manufacturers. All M12s were built by Trojan, rather than at McLaren's racing headquarters

Several M12s were later modified by customers in order to cope with necessary demands. Many Can-Am M12 customers added larger rear wings for better downforce, in an attempt to keep up with competitors which had already done the same. Two M12s were imported to Japan by LeMans Co one going to Toyota which received revised bodywork to allow better results at Japanese circuits as well as to fit company's own V8 engine. M12 owner Phil Scragg modified his car with smaller M6 bodywork for use in hillclimb events. One final M12 was used by Trojan to develop a street legal coupé for Canadian André Fournier.

== Racing history ==
As the 1969 season began, several teams had already purchased the M12. United States McLaren distributor Lothar Motschenbacher entered an M12 for himself, while Canadian George Eaton received an M12 the same week as the first event of the season. John Surtees, unhappy with the visibility on Chaparral's new 2H model, demanded the team buy him a McLaren until the 2H could be modified to suit him. Team owner Jim Hall reluctantly bought Surtees an M12, and the team used it in the beginning of the season until the 2H met Surtees satisfaction. Surtees M12 was able to lead several laps at the opening event at Mosport and finished on the podium. When Surtees became ill mid-season Italian Formula 5000 driver Andrea de Adamich was given a chance to drive the M12 at Michigan. Eaton was the only other driver able to finish on the podium in an M12 over the rest of the season, finishing third at Edmonton and second at Texas.

In Japan, Toyota made the decision to purchase an M12 imported by LeMans Co. Toyota was in the midst of racing against Nissan, Isuzu, and Porsche in several Japanese Group 7 races, but Nissan had so far been unmatched. Toyota was already developing their own model, the 7, but the company also chose to install their 5.0 litres (310 cu in) V8 engine into the M12 chassis. The M12 was unable to match the Nissans, and following several accidents and deaths of test drivers in developments of the 7 in 1969 and 1970, Toyota withdrew from motorsports and their M12 was retired. Other Japanese teams imported the M12, Kurosawa Racing but opted instead for the standard Chevrolet powerplant.

The M12s continued to be used by customer teams into the 1970s, both in Can-Am and the new European Interserie championship, but newer M8-based cars became available each year and eventually replaced the M12s in the field.
