= Group 7 (motorsport) =

Former auto racing class

Group 7 was a set of regulations for automobile racing created by the Commission Sportive Internationale (CSI), a division of the modern Fédération Internationale de l'Automobile.

There were two distinct sets of Group 7 regulations:

- Group 7 two-seater racing cars (1966 to 1975)
- Group 7 international formula racing cars (1976 to 1981)

== Group 7 two-seater racing cars (1966 to 1975) ==
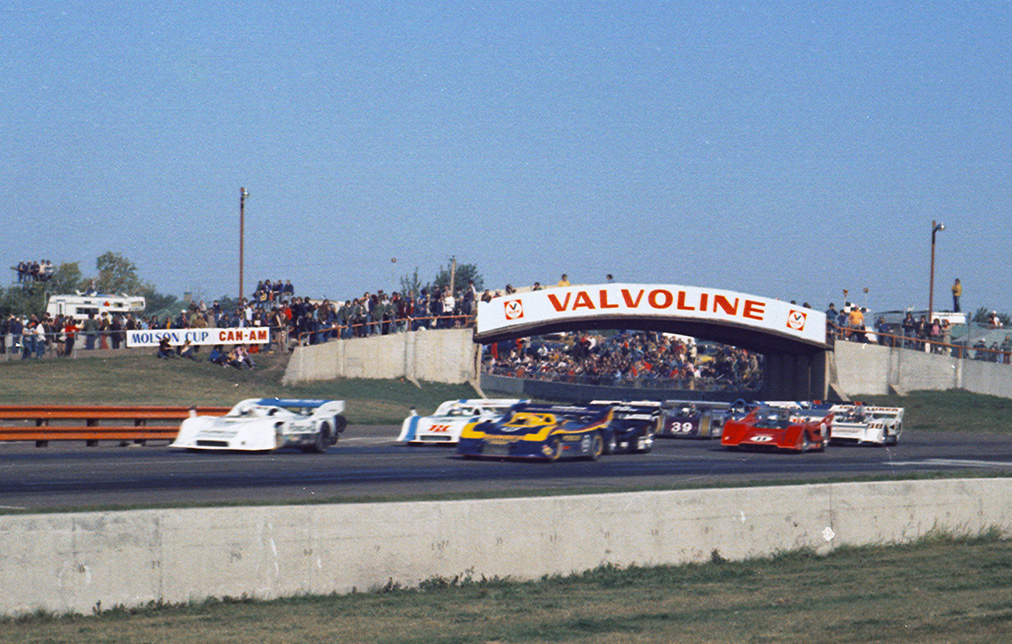
A field of Group 7 cars participating in a Can–Am race in 1973

The FIA's new Appendix J regulations for 1966 listed a category for "Group 9 two-seater racing cars" in its draft versions, but this was amended to "Group 7 two-seater racing cars" by the time of publication of the 1966 FIA Yearbook. The new Group 7 regulations specified that cars must be fitted with fenders, windshield, two seats, two doors, headlights, taillights, rollbar, a dual braking system and a self-starter and that they must utilize commercial gasoline.

Group 7 cars were defined as "two-seater competition vehicles built exclusively for speed races on closed circuit". There was no minimum production requirement necessary to earn homologation. As such, the regulations allowed manufacturers and teams freedom to create unique racing cars with no limitations on engines, tires, aerodynamics, or dimensions, as long as the car had room for two seats and was enclosed in bodywork. Races for Group 7 cars were generally short sprints, with few accommodations made for driver comfort.

Although the formula only existed for ten years, Group 7 was embraced by several series around the world, with the Sports Car Club of America running its United States Road Racing Championship for Group 7 cars from 1966 to 1968. Its Canadian-American Challenge Cup, better known as Can–Am, was also open to Group 7 cars from 1966 to 1974. In Europe, the Nordic Challenge Cup ran in 1969, replaced by the Interserie in 1970 before the series later adopted a Formula Libre format. Early editions of the Japanese Grand Prix were dominated by Group 7 cars built by Japanese manufacturers.

Many manufacturers became involved in Group 7, with McLaren and Porsche building the most dominant cars in the category. Manufacturers Lola, Chaparral, Ferrari, BRM, Shadow, Nissan, Toyota, and Isuzu all built Group 7 cars, while big-block Chevrolet and Ford motors were the engines of choice throughout the world.

The formula was current through to 1975, with two-seater racing cars defined under Group 6 regulations from 1976.

== Group 7 international formula racing cars (1976 to 1981) ==
From 1976 the FIA used the Group 7 designation for international formula racing cars. The new Group 7 encompassed International Formulae Nos 1, 2 and 3, better known as Formula 1, Formula 2 and Formula 3 respectively. It remained current through to 1981.

== List of Group 7 Prototypes ==
Brand	Chassis	Image	Debut
Autodynamics	Caldwell D7		1967
Brabham	BT17		1966
BRM	P154		1970
BRM	P167		1971
Chaparral	2E		1966
Chaparral	2H		1969
Chaparral	2J		1970
Ferrari	712P		1970
Ford	G7		1969
Lola	T70		1965
Lola	T110		1967
Lola	T120		1967
Lola	T160		1968
Lola	T161		1969
Lola	T163		1969
Lola	T220		1971
Lola	T260		1971
Lola	T310		1972
March	707		1970
March	717		1970
McKee	Mk.6		1966
McKee	Mk.7		1967
McKee	Mk.10		1968
McKee	Mk.14		1969
McLaren	M1A		1963
McLaren	M1B		1963
McLaren	M1C		1963
McLaren	M6A		1967
McLaren	M6B		1968
McLaren	M8A		1968
McLaren	M8B		1969
McLaren	M8C		1970
McLaren	M8D		1970
McLaren	M8E		1971
McLaren	M8F		1971
McLaren	M12		1969
McLaren	M20		1972
Nissan	R381		1968
Nissan	R382		1969
Nissan	R383		1970
Porsche	907		1967
Porsche	910		1966
Porsche	917 PA		1969
Porsche	917/10		1971
Porsche	917/30		1973
Shadow	Mk. I		1970
Shadow	Mk.II		1971
Shadow	Mk. III		1972
Shadow	DN2		1973
Shadow	DN4		1974
Toyota	7 (415S)		1968
Toyota	New 7 (474S)		1969
Toyota	Turbo 7 (578A)		1970

== Groups 1-9 ==
Categories and Groups of Appendix J 1954 - 1965
Categories	1954	1955	1956	1957	1958	1959	1960	1961	1962	1963	1964	1965
Categories	I. Touring						A. Touring					
Categories	II. Sports				II. Grand Touring		B. Grand Touring					
Categories	-						C. Sports					
Group	1954	1955	1956	1957	1958	1959	1960	1961	1962	1963	1964	1965
Group 1	Normal series production											
Group 2	"Grand Touring" series prod				Modified series prod		Modified series prod					
Group 3	Special series production						Grand Touring Cars					
Group 4	Series production				Normal GT series prod		Sports Car					
Group 5	International				Modified GT series prod		-					
Group 6	-				GT specials		-					

Categories and Groups of Appendix J 1966 - 1981 (Production requirement)
Categories	1966	1967	1968	1969	1970	1971	1972	1973	1974	1975	1976	1977	1978	1979	1980	1981
Categories	A. Production															
Categories	B. Special				B. Experimental Competition						B. Racing Cars					
Categories	C. Racing Cars										-					
Group	1966	1967	1968	1969	1970	1971	1972	1973	1974	1975	1976	1977	1978	1979	1980	1981
Group 1	Series Touring (5000)															
Group 2	Touring (1000)				Special Touring (1000)											
Group 3	Grand Touring (500)				Series Grand Touring (1000)											
Group 4	Sportscars (50/25)				Special Grand Touring (500)						Grand Touring (400)					
Group 5	Special Touring Cars				Sports cars (25)		Sports cars				Special cars derived from Groups 1-4					
Group 6	Prototype sportscars						-				Two-seater racecars					
Group 7	Two-seater racecars										International formula					
Group 8	Formula racing cars						International formula				Formula libre racing cars					
Group 9	Formula libre racing cars										-					
Source: Note: Special may be replaced with Competition in some official documents.
