= Friction disk shock absorber =

Shock absorber

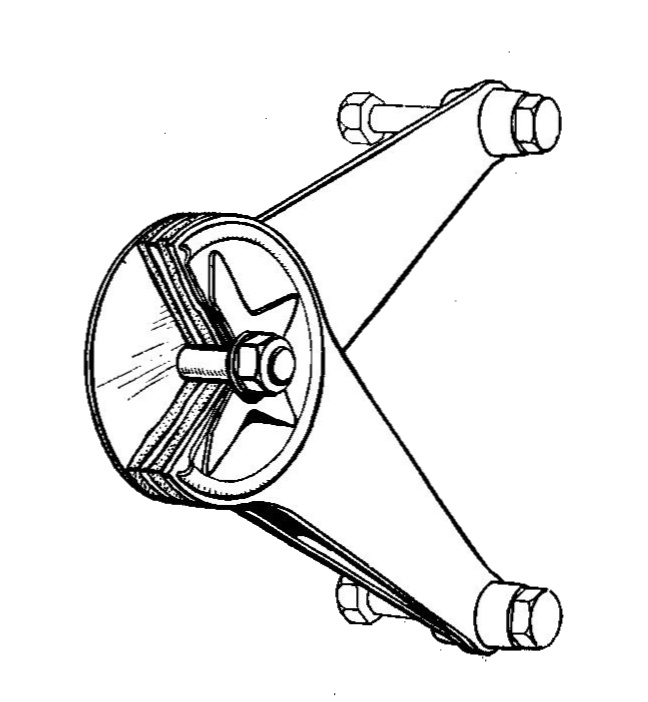
André Hartford shock absorber

Friction disc shock absorbers or André Hartford dampers were an early form of shock absorber or damper used for car suspension. They were commonly used in the 1930s but were considered obsolete post-war.

Compared to modern shock absorbers friction dampers only provided limited shock absorption but served mainly to damp down oscillation.

== Origins ==
The friction disk pattern was invented by Truffault, before 1900. These used oiled leather friction surfaces between bronze disks compressed by adjustable conical springs, with the disk pack floating between arms to both chassis and axle, in the distinctive style. From 1904 these were licensed to several makers including Mors, who had first applied shock absorbers to cars, and Hartford in the US. Similar dampers were also applied as steering dampers from this early date.

== Construction ==
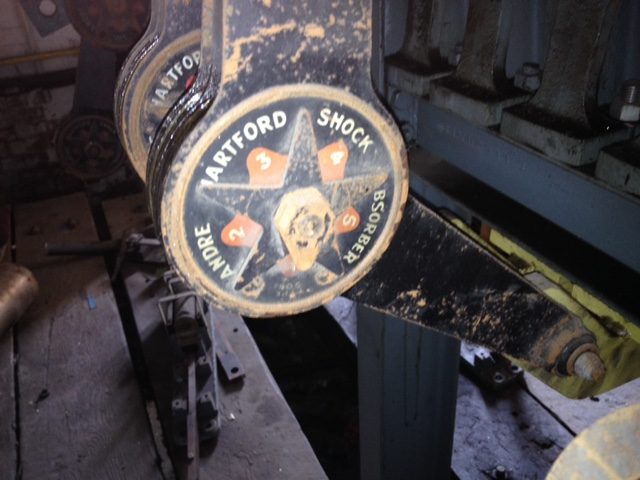
André Hartford pattern, fitted in a signalbox

The dampers rely, as their name suggests, on the friction within a stack of disks, clamped tightly together with a spring and clamp bolt.

=== André Hartford pattern ===
The friction disk material was usually a wooden disk between the two faces of the steel arms. As for the development of the clutch and brake shoes, the development of these friction materials was in its infancy. Treated leather had been used for clutches and although it offered good friction behaviour, it was prone to stiction when first moving off and also failed when overheated. Asbestos-based friction materials were sometimes used for racing, in an attempt to keep dampers working correctly even when overheating.

The damping force of a friction shock absorber is adjusted with the central pivot and clamping bolt. A star-shaped spring applies a force to the stack of disks. The damping force is roughly proportional to this force and the clamping nut is provided with a pointer arm to indicate the approximate setting.

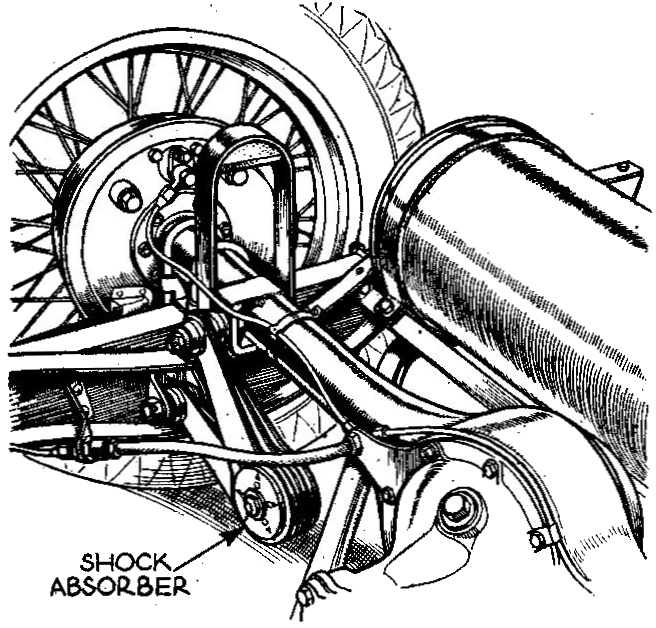
Installation in rear suspension

André Hartford dampers were made in four sizes, according to vehicle weight and intended use. These were the combination of two disk diameters: 3 1/4 inches (83 mm) and 4 1/2 inches (110 mm) and as either single or multiplate designs. Single dampers had two friction surfaces: a single arm on one side was nested between two arms connected to the other. Multiplate dampers had two and three arms on each side.

Dampers were mounted to the chassis and axle through Silentbloc bushes at each end. Silentbloc bushes were another development of the early 1930s, a vulcanised rubber bush bonded into a steel tube. These provided the stiff location that accurate suspension required, but reduced vibration and road noise, compared to earlier cars. Many cars used a different design for front and rear, where the rear arms were rigidly bolted to the chassis, rather than with a swivelling bush.

=== de Ram pattern ===
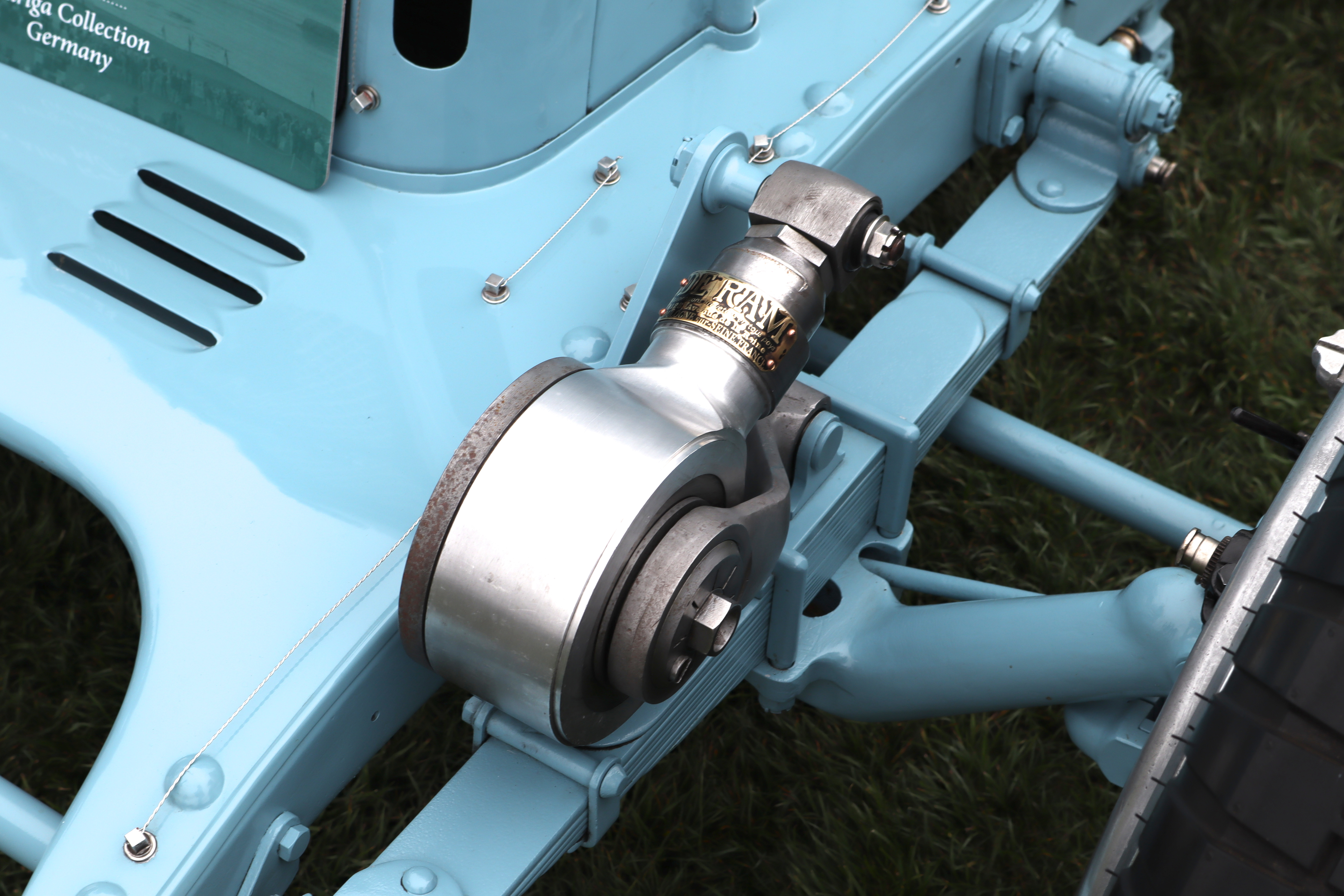
de Ram shock absorber installed on a 1933 Alfa Romeo 8C 2300 Monza

Georges de Ram invented and manufactured hydraulically actuated friction shock absorbers during the 1920s and 1930s. These were a more sophisticated pattern, intended to provide variable, self-adjusting damping in order to work effectively at both low and high speeds. They were only used on high-end vehicles, notably Bugattis, due to their extremely high cost for the time. In 1935, a set of de Ram dampers cost £170, plus an additional £30 for installation. Early Bugattis had used Bugatti's own pattern of multi-plate damper, similar to the André Hartford.

de Ram patented several styles of friction dampers that used hydraulic mechanisms to engage the friction surfaces and modulate their clamping force. While the mechanical details of de Ram's patents varied, the de Ram dampers fitted to 1930s Bugattis used a multi-plate disk stack. In this design each disk is connected to either an inner or outer cylindrical carrier via splines, much as in multi-plate clutches of the time. The splines cause each disk to rotate with either the chassis or axle side of the damper, alternating with each disk in the stack. A series of hydraulic pistons and valves varied pressure on the friction disk stack in proportion to the speed of the lever arm attached to the axle. This mechanism resulted in stiffer damping when encountering strong bumps at higher speeds, but also soft damping during slow or slight movements of the suspension. de Ram dampers were mounted to the chassis with a single arm to the axle, in a manner interchangeable with Hartford pattern dampers.

=== Cylindrical friction elements ===
A similar pattern, with a cylindrical friction element, was used on Mercedes-Benz cars from 1928. The earlier Mercedes had used Hartford pattern.

A form using a cylindrical roller bearing with a resilient race was patented in 1930.

== Adjustable damping ==
The damping rate for frictional dampers has less than ideal behaviour for car suspension. An ideal suspension would offer more damping to greater suspension forces, with less damping at low speeds for a smoother ride. Frictional dampers though had a mostly constant rate. This was even greater when stationary, owing to stiction between stationary plates. For larger bumps the damping may even be reduced. This is particularly a problem for fast driving, when repeated high forces may cause the friction plates to heat up and lose their efficiency.

Motor racing in the 1930s was often an amateur affair, where sports cars would be driven to racetracks such as Brooklands, adjusted in the paddock to their racing trim and then raced. It was normal to re-adjust the damping between "road" and "race" settings.

The need for adjustable damping was so great that it was even useful to provide a means of adjusting this whilst driving. This was a feature only used on luxury cars, often larger cars that might need to set their suspension for varying numbers of passengers. Stiffness could be increased between "town" and a stiffer setting for the faster open road. These dampers were best known under the Telecontrol brand name. A hydraulic control, with an inflatable rubber bag in the disk pack, could be used to increase the clamping force and thus their damping stiffness.

Georges de Ram's hydraulically actuated friction shock absorbers also attempted to address this issue by automatically adjusting damping forces, rather than providing manual control. These dampers used a series of hydraulic valves and pistons to vary the friction between plates, proportional to the speed of suspension movement. This resulted in stiffer damping when encountering strong bumps at higher speeds, while remaining soft during slow or slight movements of the suspension.

One of the major reasons for the decline of frictional dampers post-war, in favour of hydraulic lever arms, was the hydraulic damper's better change of rate with suspension amplitude. Hydraulic dampers had a resistance that inherently increased with velocity of suspension movement, a far more useful behaviour. This useful inherent behaviour meant that manual adjustment was far less necessary, certainly not whilst driving.

== Motorcycle and bicycle use ==
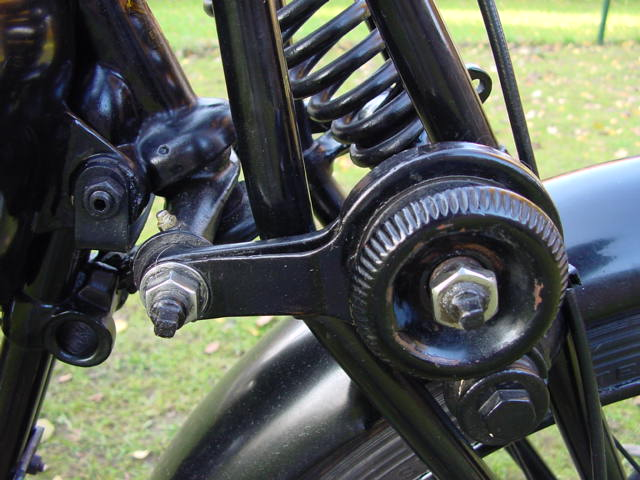
1933 Velocette motorcycle front fork

Motorcycles of the same period, through to the 1950s, that used girder forks also used friction disk shock absorbers. These were often provided with a large handwheel, so that they could be adjusted easily during a ride, or even whilst in motion.

Many Moulton bicycles continue to use friction damping for the leading link front fork. This is adjustable by tightening or loosening the small bolts that hold the two halves of the leading links together, the friction discs being sandwiched between them.

== Signalboxes ==
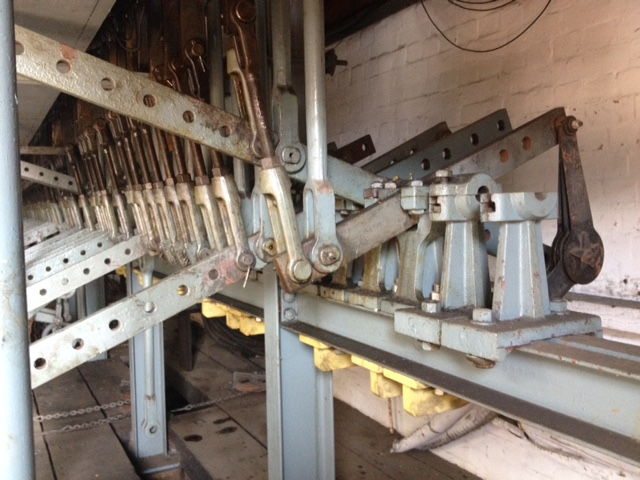
Signalbox lever frame at Stafford, with Hartford shock absorbers at the rear.

Hartford shock absorbers were also used within the manual lever frames of some UK signalboxes. They were used to prevent shock loads if the levers were allowed to slam back in the frame under the weight of the counterweights.

== Manufacturers ==
André Hartford held patents on this design but the manufacturing technology required was simple, and so many other makers also produced them.

- André Hartford, probably the best-known brand pre-war.

- F. Repusseau & Cie made the Hartford pattern under license in Paris. (Note: Like many other motor racing drivers of this period, François Repusseau financed his hobby of racing by a business interest as a parts manufacturer.)
- Bentley & Draper Ltd

- Telecontrol, noted for their adjustable dampers
- de Ram, a more complicated damper used on later Bugattis. An attempt to solve the problems that would later be addressed by hydraulic dampers.

Modern components and spare parts are still manufactured for restoration projects.
