= 1969 Can-Am season =

North American auto racing season

Seasons
- ← 1968 1970 →

The 1969 Canadian-American Challenge Cup was the fourth season of the Can-Am auto racing series. It consisted of FIA Group 7 racing cars running two-hour sprint events. It began June 1, 1969, and ended November 9, 1969, after eleven rounds.

This was the first season of Can-Am following the demise of the similar United States Road Racing Championship. With several USRRC events choosing to continue on under Can-Am, the series schedule was greatly expanded beyond its normal six event season. This also meant that the season was run over a greater period of time, rather than just being run in the autumn.

The season was swept by McLaren, whose founder Bruce McLaren won the championship over teammate and fellow New Zealander Denny Hulme. McLaren won six races to Hulme's five, winning the championship by a mere five points.

== Schedule ==
Rnd	Race	Circuit	Date
1	Labatt's Blue Trophy	Mosport Park	June 1
2	Labatt's 50	Circuit Mont-Tremblant	June 15
3	Watkins Glen Can-Am	Watkins Glen International	July 13
4	Klondike 200	Edmonton Speedway Park	July 27
5	Buckeye Can-Am	Mid-Ohio Sports Car Course	August 17
6	Road America Can-Am	Road America	August 31
7	Bridgehampton Grand Prix	Bridgehampton Race Circuit	September 14
8	Michigan International Can-Am	Michigan International Speedway	September 28
9	Monterey Castrol Grand Prix	Laguna Seca Raceway	October 12
10	Los Angeles Times Grand Prix	Riverside International Raceway	October 26
11	Texas International Grand Prix	Texas World Speedway	November 9

== Entries ==
Team	Chassis	Engine	Tire	Number	Drivers	Rounds
(United States) Porsche Audi	Porsche 917 PA	Porsche 4.5 L Flat-12	G	0	(Switzerland) Jo Siffert	5–11
(United States) Porsche Audi	Porsche 908/02K	Porsche 3.0 L Flat-8	G	9/8	(United Kingdom) Tony Dean	5–11
Porsche of Austria	Porsche 908/02K	Porsche 3.0 L Flat-8	D	1	(Switzerland) Jo Siffert	3
Porsche of Austria	Porsche 908/02K	Porsche 3.0 L Flat-8	D	2	(United Kingdom) Brian Redman	3
(United States) Holman & Moody	McLaren M6B	Ford 8.1 L V8	F	1	(United States) Mario Andretti	6, 9–11
(United Kingdom) McLaren Cars, Ltd.	McLaren M8B	Chevrolet 7.0 L V8	G	1	(United States) Dan Gurney	8
(United Kingdom) McLaren Cars, Ltd.	McLaren M8B	Chevrolet 7.0 L V8	G	3	(New Zealand) Chris Amon	9
(United Kingdom) McLaren Cars, Ltd.	McLaren M8B	Chevrolet 7.0 L V8	G	4	(New Zealand) Bruce McLaren	All
(United Kingdom) McLaren Cars, Ltd.	McLaren M8B	Chevrolet 7.0 L V8	G	5	(New Zealand) Denny Hulme	All
(United Kingdom) Alan Mann Racing, Ltd.	Ford Open Sports	Ford 8.1 L V8	G	2	(Australia) Frank Gardner	10
(United Kingdom) Alan Mann Racing, Ltd.	Ford Open Sports	Ford 8.1 L V8	G	2	(Australia) Jack Brabham	11
(United States) Roger S. Penske	Lola T163	Chevrolet 7.0 L V8	G	6	(United States) Mark Donohue	5
(United States) Chaparral Cars, Inc.	McLaren M12; Chaparral 2H	Chevrolet 7.0 L V8	F	7	(United Kingdom) John Surtees	1–7, 9–10
(United States) Chaparral Cars, Inc.	McLaren M12; Chaparral 2H	Chevrolet 7.0 L V8	F	7	(Italy) Andrea de Adamich	8
(United States) Chaparral Cars, Inc.	McLaren M12; Chaparral 2H	Chevrolet 7.0 L V8	F	7	(United States) Tom Dutton	11
(United States) Jerry Crawford	McLaren-Elva Mk. II	Chevrolet 7.0 L V8		8	(United States) Jerry Crawford	1
Matra of France	Matra MS650	Matra 3.0 L V12	D	9	(France) Johnny Servoz-Gavin	3
Matra of France	Matra MS630/650	Matra 3.0 L V12	D	40	(Mexico) Pedro Rodríguez	3
(United States) Ecurie Vickie Racing	BVC Mk. I	Chevrolet 6.0 L V8		9/6	(United States) Bruce Campbell	10–11
(United States) Carl A. Haas Racing Teams, Inc.	Lola T162; Lola T163	Chevrolet 7.0 L V8	G	10	(United States) Chuck Parsons	All
(United States) Motschenbacher Racing Enterprises	McLaren M12	Chevrolet 7.0 L V8	G	11	(Germany) Lothar Motschenbacher	All
(United States) Sandburg Travel	Lola T160	Chevrolet 7.0 L V8	G	12	(United States) Hugh Powell	2
(United States) North American Racing Team	Ferrari 312 P	Ferrari 3.0 L V12	G	12	(Mexico) Pedro Rodríguez	7
(United Kingdom) A. G. Dean Racing, Ltd.	Porsche 908/02	Porsche 3.0 L Flat-8	D	14	(United Kingdom) Tony Dean	3
(United States) Agapiou Brothers Racing	Ford G7A	Ford 7.0 L V8	G	15	(United States) Peter Revson	1–2
(United States) Agapiou Brothers Racing	Ford G7A	Ford 7.0 L V8	G	15	(Canada) John Cannon	4, 11
(United States) Agapiou Brothers Racing	Ford G7A	Ford 7.0 L V8	G	15	(United States) George Follmer	5–6
(United States) Agapiou Brothers Racing	Ford G7A	Ford 7.0 L V8	G	15	(Australia) Jack Brabham	8
(New Zealand) Formula 1 Enterprises, Inc.	Ferrari 612 P	Ferrari 6.2 L V12; Ferrari 6.9 L V12	F	16	(New Zealand) Chris Amon	3–11
(Canada) Terry Godsall	McLaren-Elva Mk. III	Ford-Weslake 5.6 L V8		17	(United States) Jerry Titus	2
Ecurie Canada 1969	McLaren-Elva Mk. III	Chevrolet 6.0 L V8	F	18	(Canada) Kris Harrison	4–11
(Switzerland) Scuderia Filipinetti	Lola T70 Mk. 3B GT	Chevrolet 5.9 L V8	G	19	(Sweden) Jo Bonnier	3
(United States) Wilson Racing	Lola T163	Chevrolet 7.0 L V8	G	19	(United States) Gary Wilson	5–6, 8–11
(United States) Jim Matuska	McLaren-Elva Mk. III	Chevrolet 6.0 L V8		20	(United States) Eric Haga	9–10
(United States) Frank Kloski	Lola T70 Mk. 2	Chevrolet 5.7 L V8	G	22	(United States) Harry Heuer	3
(United States) Autocoast	Autocoast Ti-22	Chevrolet 7.0 L V8	G	22	(United Kingdom) Jackie Oliver	9–11
(United States) Harvey Lasiter and Tiny Naylor Restaurants	McLaren-Elva Mk. III	Chevrolet 6.0 L V8	G	23	(United States) Harvey Lasiter	6, 9–10
(United States) R. J. Nagel	Lola T70 Mk. 3	Ford 7.0 L V8	G	24	(United States) Bob Nagel	1–3, 5–10
(United States) Salyer Racing	McKee Mk. 10; McKee Mk. 14	Oldsmobile 6.4 L Turbo V8; Oldsmobile 7.5 L Turbo V8	G	25	(United States) Joe Leonard	1–2, 6
(United States) Galloway Racing Team	McLaren M6B; Lola T70 Mk. 3	Chevrolet 6.0 L V8	G	27	(United States) Richie Galloway	1–4, 6, 8
(United States) Ecurie Greene, Inc.	McLaren M6B	Chevrolet 7.0 L V8	G	28	(United States) Dick Brown	1–3, 5–11
(United States) Fred Baker	McLaren M6B	Chevrolet 7.0 L V8	G	29	(United States) Fred Baker	2–3
(United States) Fred Baker	Lola T160	Chevrolet 7.0 L V8	G	49	(United States) Fred Baker	6
(United States) Jef Stevens	Lola T70 Mk. 3B	Chevrolet 6.0 L V8	G	29	(United States) Jef Stevens	7
(United States) Robbins-Jeffries Racing Team	Lola T163	Chevrolet 7.0 L V8	G	31	(United States) Ronnie Bucknum	3
(United States) Robbins-Jeffries Racing Team	Lola T163	Chevrolet 7.0 L V8	G	31	(United States) Peter Revson	5–11
(Canada) Ross Murray	Hayman	Chevrolet V8		32	(Canada) Ross Murray	2
(United States) Nelli Racing Enterprises	Lola T70 Mk. 3B	Chevrolet 7.0 L V8	G	32	(United States) Vic Nelli	9–10
(United States) Warren Burmester	Lola T70 Mk. 3	Chevrolet 6.3 L V8	F	34/84	(United States) George Drolsom	1–3, 5–6, 8
(United States) Clif Apel	McLaren-Elva Mk. III	Chevrolet 6.3 L V8	G	37	(United States) Clif Apel	3, 5–6, 8, 11
(United States) Frank Kahlich	McLaren-Elva Mk. III	Chevrolet 6.0 L V8	G	39	(United States) Frank Kahlich	1–2, 5, 8
(United States) D. M. Brooke Doran	Lola T162	Chevrolet 7.0 L V8	G	43	(United States) Brooke Doran	3, 5–6, 8
(United States) Jerry Hansen	McLaren M6B	Chevrolet 7.0 L V8	G	44	(United States) Jerry Hansen	6
(United States) All American Racers	McLaren M6B	Ford-Weslake 5.6 L V8; Chevrolet 7.0 L V8	G	48	(United States) Dan Gurney	1–2, 8–10
(United States) Frank Kloski	Lola T70 Mk. 2	Chevrolet 5.7 L V8		50	(United States) Tom Terrell	1–2
(United States) Dave Causey	McLaren M6A	Chevrolet 7.0 L V8		51	(United States) Dave Causey	6, 8, 11
(United States) Auto World, Inc.	McLaren M6B	Chevrolet 6.0 L V8	G	54	(United States) Oscar Koveleski	1–3, 5–6
(Canada) McCaig Racing Enterprises	McLaren M6B	Chevrolet 6.0 L V8	G	55	(Canada) Roger McCaig	1, 4, 8–11
(Canada) McCaig Racing Enterprises	McLaren M6B	Chevrolet 6.0 L V8	G	55	(Canada) John Cordts	2–3
(Canada) Performance Engineering	McLaren-Elva Mk. III	Chevrolet 7.0 L V8	F	57	(Canada) John Cordts	1
(United States) Monte Shelton	McLaren-Elva Mk. III	Chevrolet 7.0 L V8		57	(United States) Monte Shelton	9–10
(United States) Don Jensen	Burnett Mk. 2	Chevrolet 6.0 L V8		60	(United States) Don Jensen	9–10
(United States) F & H Racing	McKee Mk. 6B	Oldsmobile 7.0 L V8	F	64	(United States) Chuck Frederick	4, 6, 9–11
(United States) Ron Grable	Lola T70 Mk. 2	Chevrolet 6.0 L V8	G	68	(United States) Ron Grable	4
(United States) Stan Burnett	Burnett Mk. 3	Chevrolet 7.0 L V8	G	71	(United States) Stan Burnett	4, 6
(United States) John Williamson	Lola T70 Mk. 2	Chevrolet 6.0 L V8		73	(United States) John Williamson	9
(United States) John Williamson	Lola T70 Mk. 2	Chevrolet 6.0 L V8		73	(United States) Lou Pavesi	10
(United States) Eric Hauser	Lola T70 Mk. 2	Chevrolet 7.0 L V8	G	74	(United States) Doug Hooper	9
(United States) Eric Hauser	Lola T70 Mk. 2	Chevrolet 7.0 L V8	G	74	(United States) Eric Hauser	10
(United States) Janke Auto Company	McLaren-Elva Mk. III	Chevrolet V8		75/72	(United States) Leonard Janke	1–2
(United States) Fayer-Dini	Lola T162	Chevrolet 7.0 L V8	F	75	(United States) Bob Dini	3, 6–9
(United States) Beck Racing	Lola T160; McLaren-Elva Mk. III	Chevrolet 7.0 L V8; Chevrolet 6.0 L V8	G	77/79	(United States) Leonard Janke	3–4, 6–8, 10–11
(United States) Automotion of San Diego	Lola T70 Mk. 2	Chevrolet 6.0 L V8		77	(United States) Jack Millikan	10
(United States) Dutton Racing Enterprises	Lola T70 Mk. 3	Chevrolet 6.0 L V8; Chevrolet 7.0 L V8	F	79	(United States) Tom Dutton	1–7
(United States) K. P. Speet	McLaren-Elva Mk. III	Ford-Weslake 7.0 L V8	G	79	(United States) Kirt Speet	8
(United States) Northwest American Racing Team	McLaren-Elva Mk. III	Chevrolet 6.0 L V8		81	(United States) Spencer Stoddard	6, 9–10
(Canada) Ecurie Montreal	McLaren-Elva Mk. IIB	Chevrolet 5.9 L V8	F	86	(Canada) Jacques Couture	1–2
(United States) Trident Racing Enterprises	Lola T160	Chrysler 7.0 L V8	G	88	(United States) Ron Dykes	9–10
(United States) John Cholis/Eric Hauser and Tiny Naylor Restaurant	Lola T70 Mk. 3B	Chevrolet 6.0 L V8		91	(United States) Doug Hooper	6, 10
(United States) David P. Hurley	McLaren-Elva Mk. IIB	Chevrolet 6.0 L V8		92	(United States) David Hurley	10
(United States) Dr. Leonard Faustina	Lola T70 Mk. 3	Chevrolet 6.0 L V8	F	96	(United States) Len Faustina	1–2
(United States) Doug Harding	Lola T70 Mk. 3	Chevrolet 7.0 L V8		97	(United States) Dick Kantrud	6
(United States) Tranquil Racing	Lola T70 Mk. 3	Chevrolet 6.0 L V8	G	97	(United States) Ron Goldleaf	7–11
(Canada) George Eaton Racing	McLaren M12	Chevrolet 7.0 L V8	F	98	(Canada) George Eaton	All
(United States) Young American Racing	McLaren M6B	Ford 7.0 L V8	F	99	(Canada) John Cannon	1–2, 5
(United States) Young American Racing	McLaren M6B	Ford 7.0 L V8	F	99	(United Kingdom) David Hobbs	6, 8
(United States) Young American Racing	McLaren M6B	Ford 7.0 L V8	F	99	(Canada) John Cordts	9–11

== Season results ==
Rnd	Circuit	Winning team	Results
Rnd	Circuit	Winning driver	Results
1	Mosport	(United Kingdom) #4 McLaren Cars	Results
1	Mosport	(New Zealand) Bruce McLaren	Results
2	Mont-Tremblant	(United Kingdom) #5 McLaren Cars	Results
2	Mont-Tremblant	(New Zealand) Denny Hulme	Results
3	Watkins Glen	(United Kingdom) #4 McLaren Cars	Results
3	Watkins Glen	(New Zealand) Bruce McLaren	Results
4	Edmonton	(United Kingdom) #5 McLaren Cars	Results
4	Edmonton	(New Zealand) Denny Hulme	Results
5	Mid-Ohio	(United Kingdom) #5 McLaren Cars	Results
5	Mid-Ohio	(New Zealand) Denny Hulme	Results
6	Road America	(United Kingdom) #4 McLaren Cars	Results
6	Road America	(New Zealand) Bruce McLaren	Results
7	Bridgehampton	(United Kingdom) #5 McLaren Cars	Results
7	Bridgehampton	(New Zealand) Denny Hulme	Results
8	Michigan	(United Kingdom) #4 McLaren Cars	Results
8	Michigan	(New Zealand) Bruce McLaren	Results
9	Laguna Seca	(United Kingdom) #4 McLaren Cars	Results
9	Laguna Seca	(New Zealand) Bruce McLaren	Results
10	Riverside	(United Kingdom) #5 McLaren Cars	Results
10	Riverside	(New Zealand) Denny Hulme	Results
11	Texas	(United Kingdom) #4 McLaren Cars	Results
11	Texas	(New Zealand) Bruce McLaren	Results

== Drivers Championship ==
Points are awarded to the top ten finishers in the order of 20-15-12-10-8-6-4-3-2-1. Only the best nine finishes out of eleven rounds counted towards the championship. Points earned but not counting towards the championship are marked by parenthesis.

Pos	Driver	Team	Car	Engine	R.1	R.2	R.3	R.4	R.5	R.6	R.7	R.8	R.9	R.10	R.11	Total
1	(New Zealand) Bruce McLaren	(United Kingdom) McLaren Cars	McLaren M8B	Chevrolet	20	15	20		15	20	15	20	20		20	165
2	(New Zealand) Denny Hulme	(United Kingdom) McLaren Cars	McLaren M8B	Chevrolet	(15)	20	15	20	20	15	20	15	15	20		160
3	(United States) Chuck Parsons	(United States) Carl A. Haas Racing Team	Lola T162; Lola T163	Chevrolet	8	12	8			12	4	6	12	15	8	85
4	(Switzerland) Jo Siffert	(Germany) Porsche-Audi	Porsche 908/02; Porsche 917PA	Porsche			6		10		12	10	8		10	56
5	(Canada) George Eaton	(Canada) George Eaton Racing	McLaren M12	Chevrolet	2	4	10	12	6			3			15	52
6	(New Zealand) Chris Amon	(New Zealand) Chris Amon (United Kingdom) McLaren Cars (New Zealand) Formula 1 Enterprises	Ferrari 612P; McLaren M8B; Ferrari 712P	Ferrari; Chevrolet; Ferrari			12	15	12							39
7	(Germany) Lothar Motschenbacher	(United States) Motschenbacher Racing	McLaren M12	Chevrolet		10				6	10		3		6	35
8	(United Kingdom) Tony Dean	(Germany) Porsche-Audi	Porsche 908/02	Porsche			2		3	8	6	4	4	4	3	34
9	(United Kingdom) John Surtees	(United States) Chaparral Cars Inc.	McLaren M12; Chaparral 2H	Chevrolet	12			10	8							30
10	(Canada) John Cordts	(Canada) McCaig Racing (United States) Young American Racers	McLaren M6B	Chevrolet; Ford	10	8							6			24
11=	(United States) Dan Gurney	(United States) All American Racers (United Kingdom) McLaren Cars	McLaren M6B; McLaren M8B	Ford; Chevrolet								12		10		22
11=	(United States) Mario Andretti	(United States) Holman & Moody	McLaren M6B	Ford									10	12		22
13	(United States) Peter Revson	(United States) Agapiou Brothers (United States) Robbins-Jeffries Racing	Ford G7A; Lola T163	Ford; Chevrolet					4	10				8		22
14	(United States) Dick Brown	(United States) Ecurie Green	McLaren M6B	Chevrolet					2	4	3		1	3		13
15	(Australia) Jack Brabham	(United States) Agapiou Brothers (United Kingdom) Alan Mann Racing	Ford G7A; Open Sports	Ford											12	12
16=	(United States) Tom Dutton	(United States) Dutton Racing	Lola T70 Mk.3B	Chevrolet		1		8								9
16=	(Mexico) Pedro Rodríguez	Matra of France (United States) North American Racing Team	Matra MS630/650; Ferrari 312P	Matra; Ferrari			1				8					9
18	(United States) Leonard Janke	(United States) Leonard Janke	McLaren M1C; Lola T160	Chevrolet	1			4			2				2	9
19	(Italy) Andrea de Adamich	(United States) Chaparral Cars Inc.	McLaren M12	Chevrolet								8				8
20	(Canada) Jacques Couture	(Canada) Ecurie Soucy Racing	McLaren M1B	Chevrolet	6	2										8
21	(Canada) Kris Harrison	Ecurie Canada 1969	McLaren M1C	Chevrolet				6		1	1					8
22	(United States) Gary Wilson	(United States) Wilson Racing	Lola T163	Chevrolet					1					6		7
23	(United States) Oscar Koveleski	(United States) Auto-World, Inc.	McLaren M6B	Chevrolet	4					3						7
24	(United States) Fred Baker	(United States) Fred Baker	McLaren M6B; Lola T160	Chevrolet		6										6
25	(United States) Dave Causey	(United States) Dave Causey	McLaren M6A	Chevrolet								2			4	6
26	(United States) Richard Galloway	(United States) R.B. Galloway	McLaren M6B	Chevrolet	3								2			5
27	(Sweden) Jo Bonnier	(Switzerland) Scuderia Filipinetti	Lola T70 Mk.3B	Chevrolet			4									4
28=	(United States) Joe Leonard	(United States) Salyer Racing	McKee Mk.10; McKee Mk.14	Oldsmobile		3										3
28=	(France) Johnny Servoz-Gavin	Matra of France	Matra MS650	Matra			3									3
30	(Canada) Roger McCaig	(Canada) McCaig Racing	McLaren M6B	Chevrolet										2	1	3
31	(United States) Brooke Doran	(United States) Marshall Brooke Doran	Lola T160	Chevrolet						2						2
32=	(United Kingdom) David Hobbs	(United States) Young American Racers	McLaren M6B	Ford								1				1
32=	(United States) Spencer Stoddard	(United States) Northwest American Racing	McLaren M1C	Chevrolet										1		1

== Bibliography ==
- Robert Weber (June 2017). Automobilsport Racing / History / Passion #12: Can-Am 1969. Sportfahrer Verlag. ISSN 2199-126X.
