= 1966 Can-Am season =

North American autoracing series

Seasons
- ← none 1967 →

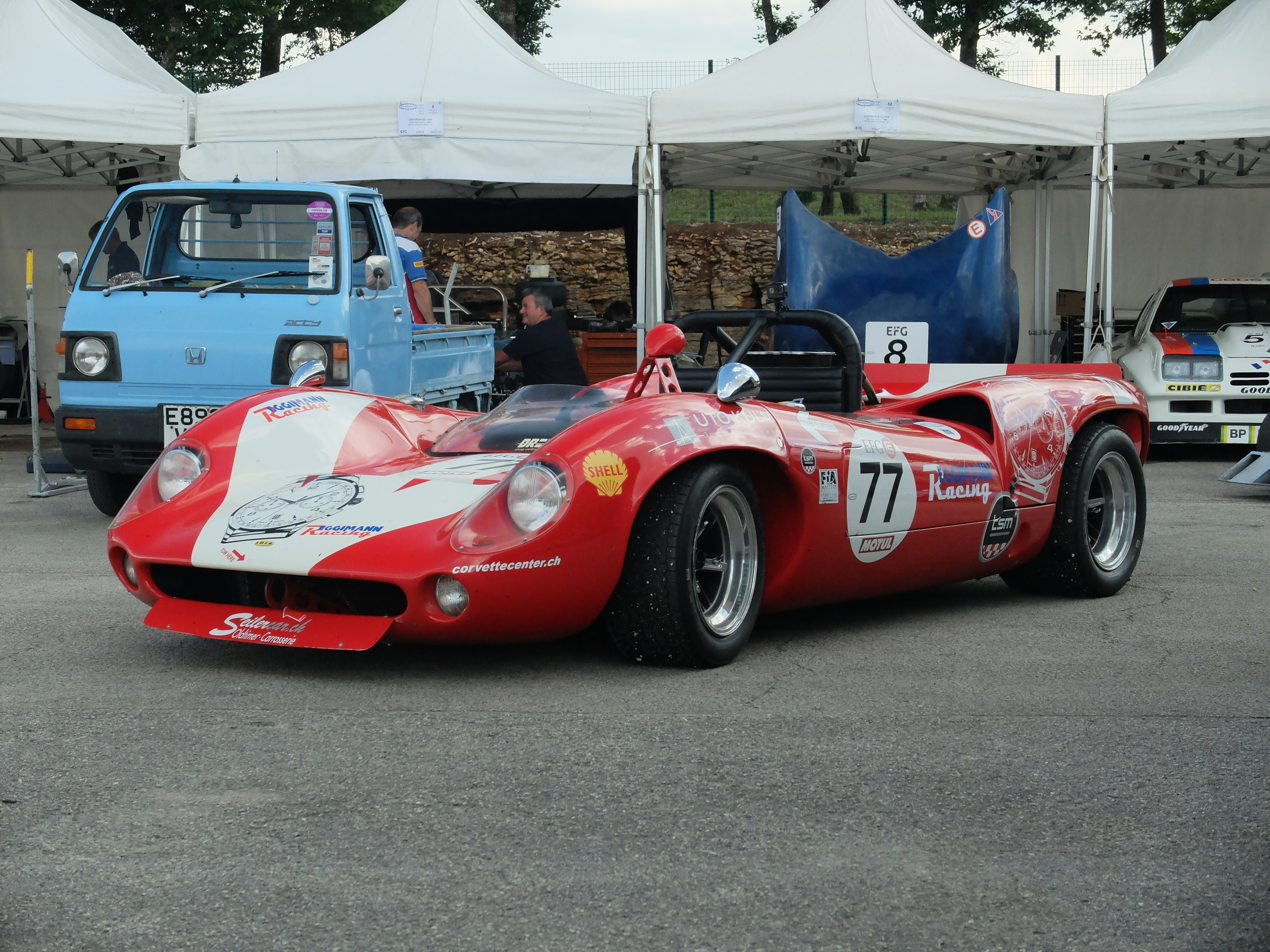
The series was won by John Surtees driving a Lola T70 Mk.2, similar to the example pictured above.

The 1966 Canadian-American Challenge Cup was the inaugural season of the Can-Am auto racing series, co-organized by the Sports Car Club of America and the Canadian Automobile Sport Clubs. The series was intended for cars that met international Group 7 regulations for sports cars, and featured two-hour sprint races. It began on September 11, 1966, and ended on November 13, 1966, after six races, with the Johnson Wax Trophy awarded to the drivers' champion.

Former Formula One World Champion John Surtees of England won the championship driving a Chevrolet-powered Lola T70 Mk. 2 entered by his own team, winning three of the season's races. Championship runner-up Mark Donohue of the United States won one race, as did Phil Hill and Dan Gurney.

== Schedule ==
The Can-Am series scheduled its events for the fall, starting one week after the end of the similar United States Road Racing Championship. The season began in eastern Canada and the United States before transitioning to California and Nevada for the second half of the season. The Laguna Seca round was run as two one-hour sprints, with the final race results being an aggregate of the two heats.

Rnd	Race	Circuit	Date
1	Player's Quebec	Circuit Mont-Tremblant, Mont-Tremblant, Quebec, Canada	September 11
2	Bridgehampton Grand Prix	Bridgehampton Race Circuit, Bridgehampton, New York, United States	September 18
3	Canadian Grand Prix	Mosport Park, Clarington, Ontario, Canada	September 24
4	Monterey Grand Prix	Laguna Seca Raceway, Monterey, California, United States	October 16
5	Los Angeles Times Grand Prix	Riverside International Raceway, Moreno Valley, California, United States	October 30
6	Stardust Grand Prix	Stardust Raceway, Spring Valley, Nevada, United States	November 13

== Entries ==
Team	Chassis	Engine	Tire	Number	Drivers	Rounds
(United States) Robert Brown	Lola T70 Mk. 2	Chevrolet 5.4 L V8	G	00	(United States) Bob Brown	2–3
(United States) Schroeder Racing Team	Dino 206 S	Ferrari 2.0 L V6	G	1	(United States) Charlie Kolb	2
(United States) John W. Mecom Jr.	Lola T70 Mk. 2	Ford 7.0 L V8	F	1	(United States) Mario Andretti	5–6
(United States) John W. Mecom Jr.	Lola T70 Mk. 2	Ford 4.7 L V8	F	116/16	(United States) George Follmer	1–3
(United States) John W. Mecom Jr.	Lola T70 Mk. 2	Ford 5.7 L V8	F	43	(United Kingdom) Jackie Stewart	4–6
(United States) John W. Mecom Jr.	Lola T70 Mk. 2	Ford 4.7 L Supercharged V8; Ford 4.9 L V8	F	198/98	(United States) Parnelli Jones	1–2, 4–6
(United States) John W. Mecom Jr.	Lola T70 Mk. 2	Ford 4.7 L Supercharged V8; Ford 4.9 L V8	F	198/98	(United States) Al Unser	2
(United States) William M. Wonder, Inc.	Genie Mk. VIII	Ford 2.0 L		2	(United States) William Wonder	2
(United States) Jack Nethercutt	Mirage Mk. IA	Oldsmobile 4.6 L V8		2	(United States) Scooter Patrick	4–6
(United Kingdom) Team Surtees Ltd.	Lola T70 Mk. 2	Chevrolet 5.9 L V8	F	3/7	(United Kingdom) John Surtees	All
(United Kingdom) Team Surtees Ltd.	Lola T70 Mk. 2	Chevrolet 5.9 L V8	F	3	(United Kingdom) Graham Hill	5
(United States) North American Racing Team (United States) Bill Harrah (United States) Modern Classic Motors	Dino 206 S	Ferrari 2.0 L V6	G	3/21/24	(Mexico) Pedro Rodríguez	2, 4–5
(United Kingdom) Bruce McLaren Motor Racing Ltd.	McLaren-Elva Mk. IIB	Chevrolet 5.5 L V8	F	4	(New Zealand) Bruce McLaren	All
(United Kingdom) Bruce McLaren Motor Racing Ltd.	McLaren-Elva Mk. IIB	Chevrolet 5.5 L V8	F	5	(New Zealand) Chris Amon	All
(United States) Bud Morley	McLaren-Elva Mk. II	Chevrolet 5.4 L V8		6/61/1	(United States) Bud Morley	All
(United States) Paul Reinhart	Genie Mk. VIII	Chevrolet 5.2 L V8		6	(United States) Paul Reinhart	4
(United States) All American Racers	Lola T70 Mk. 1	Chevrolet 5.4 L V8; Ford 4.7 L V8	G	8	(United States) Jerry Grant	1–3
(United States) All American Racers	Lola T70 Mk. 2	Ford-Weslake 5.0 L V8	G	30	(United States) Dan Gurney	All
(United Kingdom) Epstein Enterprises Ltd.	Lola T70 Mk. 2	Chevrolet 6.0 L V8	G	9/25/11	(Australia) Paul Hawkins	All
(United States) Hudson Enterprises	Lola T70 Mk. 1	Chevrolet 5.4 L V8	F	9	(United States) Skip Hudson	5
(United States) Hilton Racing Team	McLaren-Elva Mk. II	Chevrolet 6.0 L V8	G	10	(United States) Chuck Parsons	All
(United Kingdom) Racing Partnerships (Jersey) Ltd.	Lola T70 Mk. 2 Lola T70 Mk. 1	Chevrolet 5.9 L V8		11/53	(United Kingdom) Hugh Dibley	1, 3–4, 6
(United Kingdom) Racing Partnerships (Jersey) Ltd.	Lola T70 Mk. 2 Lola T70 Mk. 1	Chevrolet 5.9 L V8		11/53	(United States) Scooter Patrick	5
(United States) Huffaker Automotive Engineering	Genie Mk. XB	Chevrolet 5.4 L V8		11	(United States) Bob Bondurant	5
(United States) Ecurie Shirlee Corporation	Cherokee Mk. I	Ford 4.7 L V8		12	(United States) Bob Challman	4
(United States) Herb Wetson	Porsche 906	Porsche 2.0 L Flat-6		15	(United States) Herb Wetson	2
(Canada) Dr. Tom Ashwell	Elva Mk. VIIIS	BMW 2.0 L I4		15	(Canada) Tom Ashwell	3
(United States) Bob Montana	McKee Mk. V	Plymouth 6.6 L V8		15	(United States) Bob Montana	5
(United States) Roger Penske Racing Enterprises	Lola T70 Mk. 2	Chevrolet 5.5 L V8	F	16/6/61	(United States) Mark Donohue	All
(United States) George Follmer Enterprises, Inc.	Lola T70 Mk. 2	Chevrolet 5.5 L V8	F	16	(United States) George Follmer	4–6
(United States) Porsche of America	Porsche 906	Porsche 2.0 L Flat-6	G	17	(United States) Joe Buzzetta	2
(Canada) Lynx Racing Team	McLaren-Elva Mk. II	Ford 4.7 L V8		18	(Canada) Peter Lerch	1, 3
(United States) Dick Niles	McLaren-Elva Mk. II	Mercury 4.6 L V8		19	(United States) Bill Amick	4–5
(United States) Reagan for Governor Committee (United States) Joehnk Chevrolet Components	Lola T70 Mk. 2	Chevrolet 5.4 L V8		20/0	(United States) Norm Smith	4, 6
(United States) Autodynamics Corporation	McLaren-Elva Mk. II	Ford 4.7 L V8	G	22/33	(United States) Sam Posey	All
(United States) Alderman Automotive Service	Lola T70 Mk. 2	Ford 4.7 L V8	F	23	(United States) George Alderman	1–2
(United States) Alderman Automotive Service	Lola T70 Mk. 2	Ford 4.7 L V8	F	23	(United States) Brett Lunger	3–6
Private Entry	McLaren-Elva Mk. I	Ford V8		26	(United States) Ron Courtney	3
(United States) Ron Salyer	McKee Mk. 6	Oldsmobile 5.7 L V8		26	(United States) Ron Salyer	6
(United States) Michael A. Gammino III	Bizzarrini P538	Lamborghini 3.9 L V12	F	28	(United States) Mike Gammino	2
(United States) Young-BARF Racing Team	Lola T70 Mk. 2	Ford 4.7 L V8	F	29	(United States) Bob Bucher	2–3
(United States) Steve Diulo	Lotus 19G	Ford 4.7 L V8		29	(United States) Steve Diulo	6
(United States) Haskell Automotive	Lola T70 Mk. 1	Ford 4.7 L V8		31	(United States) Dave Jordan	4
(Canada) The Canadian Motoring Scene	Chinook Mk. I	Chevrolet V8		33/22	(Canada) George Fejer	1, 3
(United States) RBM Motors	Genie Mk. XB	Chevrolet 5.4 L V8	G	36	(United States) Jack Ryan	1–2
(United States) Joe Lucy	McLaren-Elva Mk. I	Chevrolet 5.4 L V8		36	(United States) Bud Tinglestad	4
(United States) Haskell Automotive	Lola T70 Mk. 1	Ford 4.7 L V8		37	(United States) Ronnie Bucknum	1
(Canada) VW Yonge Ltd.	Porsche 906	Porsche 2.0 L Flat-6		37	(Canada) Horst Kroll	3
(United States) Ecurie Greene, Inc.	McLaren-Elva Mk. II	Ford 4.7 L V8	G	38	(United States) Dick Brown	1–3, 5
(Canada) Ludwig Heimrath	McLaren-Elva Mk. II	Ford 7.0 L V8; Ford 5.4 L V8		39	(Canada) Ludwig Heimrath	1, 3–5
(United States) Jerry Hansen	Wolverine LD65	Chevrolet 5.4 L V8	G	41	(United States) Jerry Hansen	1
(United States) Suburban Racing Team	Denmacher II	Porsche 1.7 L V8		41	(United States) John Dennis	2
(Canada) Ecurie Portland	Merlyn Mk. 8	Chevrolet 5.4 L V8		44	(Canada) Peter Christianson	1, 3
(Canada) Air Cool Machine Shop	Porsche 718 RS61	Porsche 1.6 L Flat-4		45	(Canada) Rudy Bartling	3
Private Entry	Brabham BT8	Coventry Climax		48	(United States) Skip Barber	3
(United States) Eve & Jones Racing	Genie Mk. X	Ford 4.7 L V8		52	(United States) Bill Eve	All
Private Entry	Lotus 19	Ford 4.7 L V8		54	(United States) Dave Causey	3
(United States) Hollywood Sports Cars	McLaren-Elva Mk. II	Ford 4.6 L V8		55	(United States) Jim Adams	1, 4
(United States) Ralph M. Trieschmann	Porsche 906	Porsche 2.0 L Flat-6		56	(United States) Ralph Trieschmann	3
(United States) Masterson Racing	PAM GP7	Ford 4.8 L V8	G	56	(United States) Dick Guldstrand	4–5
(Canada) David Billes	McLaren-Elva Mk. I	Chevrolet 5.4 L V8		57	(Canada) John Cordts	3
(United States) Monte R. Shelton	Lola T70 Mk. 1	Chevrolet 5.7 L V8		57	(United States) Monte Shelton	5
(United States) Robert E. Amery	Elva Mk. VII	BMW 2.0 L I4		58	(United States) Chuck Dietrich	3
(United States) Hamill Cars, Inc.	Hamill SR3	Chevrolet 5.5 L V8	F	60/69	(United States) Ed Hamill	2–6
(Canada) Ecurie Carabine (Canada) Gun Motor Racing, Ltd.	McLaren-Elva Mk. II	Chevrolet 5.4 L V8	F	62	(Canada) John Cannon	All
(United States) Alan Green	Burnett Mk. 2	Chevrolet 5.4 L V8		64	(United States) Stan Burnett	4
(United States) Chaparral Cars	Chaparral 2E	Chevrolet 5.4 L V8	F	65	(United States) Jim Hall	2
(United States) Chaparral Cars	Chaparral 2E	Chevrolet 5.4 L V8	F	65	(United States) Phil Hill	2–6
(United States) Chaparral Cars	Chaparral 2E	Chevrolet 5.4 L V8	F	66	(United States) Phil Hill	2
(United States) Chaparral Cars	Chaparral 2E	Chevrolet 5.4 L V8	F	66	(United States) Jim Hall	3–6
(United States) Cut N' Jump Ski Corporation	Brabham BT8	Oldsmobile 4.0 L V8		67	(United States) Tom Tobin	6
(United States) Jerry Crawford	Lola T70 Mk. 2	Chrysler 5.0 L V8		70	(United States) Jerry Crawford	1–2
(United States) Hilton Oil Don Jensen	Burnett Mk. 2	Chevrolet 4.2 L V8		70	(United States) Don Jensen	6
(United States) Bob Hutchins	Ferrari 275 GTB/C	Ferrari 3.3 L V12	G	71	(United States) Bob Hutchins	2
(Canada) Phil Seitz	Lotus 23B	Coventry Climax		72	(Canada) Phil Seitz	1, 3
(United States) Bud Gates	McLaren-Elva Mk. I	Chevrolet 5.4 L V8	F	73	(United States) Bud Gates	1, 3
(United States) Webster Racing Enterprises	Webster 4-Litre	Oldsmobile 4.0 L V8		76	(United States) Ed Leslie	5
(United States) Webster Racing Enterprises	Webster 4-Litre	Oldsmobile 4.0 L V8		76	(United States) Jerry Titus	6
(United States) Eugene J. Stanton	Stanton SR1	Chevrolet 4.7 L V8		77	(United States) Eugene Stanton	2
(United States) John W. Fritsch	McKee Mk. 6	Chevrolet 5.8 L V8		77	(United States) Mak Kronn	3–4
(Republic of Ireland) Sidney Taylor	Lola T70 Mk. 2	Chevrolet 5.9 L V8	F	81/8	(New Zealand) Denny Hulme	3–6
(United States) Alan Green Chevrolet	Lola T70 Mk. 2	Chevrolet 6.0 L V8	G	81	(United States) Jerry Grant	5
(Canada) Norman Verreault	McKee Mk. 6	Ford V8		83	(Canada) Marius Amiot	1
(United States) A. J. Foyt Jr.	Lola T70 Mk. 2	Ford 6.9 L V8		83	(United States) A. J. Foyt	5
(United States) Mike Goth Racing	Goth Special	Chevrolet 5.5 L V8	F	86	(United States) Mike Goth	2–6
(United States) Pacesetter Homes	McLaren-Elva Mk. II	Chevrolet 5.5 L V8	G	88	(United States) Masten Gregory	All
(United States) Eno DePasquale	Genie Mk. VIII	Chevrolet 5.4 L V8		89	(United States) Eno DePasquale	2
(United Kingdom) Drummond Racing Organisation	McLaren-Elva Mk. II	Ford 5.7 L V8	F	91/19	(United States) Skip Scott	All
(United Kingdom) Drummond Racing Organisation	McLaren-Elva Mk. II	Ford 5.7 L V8	F	91/19	(New Zealand) Denny Hulme	5
(United Kingdom) Drummond Racing Organisation	McLaren-Elva Mk. II	Ford 4.7 L V8	F	20	(United States) Peter Revson	5–6
(Canada) George Eaton	Shelby Cobra	Ford 7.0 L V8		93	(Canada) George Eaton	3
(Canada) Comstock Racing Team	Ford GT40	Ford 4.7 L V8	F	94	(Canada) Eppie Wietzes	1, 3
(United States) Dan Blocker Motor Racing	Genie Mk. X	Oldsmobile 5.3 L V8	G	95	(United States) Bob Harris	1–3, 5–6
(United States) Dan Blocker Motor Racing	McLaren-Elva Mk. II	Oldsmobile 5.0 L V8; Chevrolet 5.0 L V8	G	96	(West Germany) Lothar Motschenbacher	All
(United States) Charlie Hayes Motor Racing/Nickey-Chevrolet	McLaren-Elva Mk. II	Chevrolet 5.4 L V8	G	98/97	(United States) Charlie Hayes	All
(United States) Charlie Hayes Motor Racing/Nickey-Chevrolet	McLaren-Elva Mk. II	Chevrolet 5.4 L V8	G	99	(United States) Earl Jones	3–5
(United States) Doug Revson	Porsche 906	Porsche 2.0 L Flat-6	G	123/12/32	(United States) Doug Revson	All
(Canada) Veedol Racing Team	Cooper Monaco T61M	Ford 4.7 L V8	G	169	(Canada) Nat Adams	1
(Canada) Louis Donolo Jr.	Merlyn Mk. 6	Ford 2.0 L		141	(Canada) Louis Donolo	3

== Season results ==
Rnd	Circuit	Winning team	Results
Rnd	Circuit	Winning driver	Results
1	Mont-Tremblant	(United Kingdom) #3 Team Surtees	Report
1	Mont-Tremblant	(United Kingdom) John Surtees	Report
2	Bridgehampton	(United States) #30 All American Racers	Report
2	Bridgehampton	(United States) Dan Gurney	Report
3	Mosport	(United States) #6 Roger Penske Racing	Report
3	Mosport	(United States) Mark Donohue	Report
4	Laguna Seca	(United States) #65 Chaparral Cars	Report
4	Laguna Seca	(United States) Phil Hill	Report
5	Riverside	(United Kingdom) #7 Team Surtees	Report
5	Riverside	(United Kingdom) John Surtees	Report
6	Stardust	(United Kingdom) #7 Team Surtees	Report
6	Stardust	(United Kingdom) John Surtees	Report

== Drivers Championship ==
Points were awarded at the end of each race to the top six finishing drivers in the order of 9-6-4-3-2-1. The driver who accumulated the most points at the end of the season was declared the champion and awarded the Johnson Wax Trophy. The trophy, commissioned by series sponsor S. C. Johnson & Son, was designed by artist Alberto Collie. Johnson also awarded $25,000 USD in prize money to the series champion.

Pos.	Driver	Team	MON	BRI	MOS	LAG	RIV	STA	Total
1	(United Kingdom) John Surtees	(United Kingdom) Team Surtees	1	Ret	Ret	Ret	1	1	27
2	(United States) Mark Donohue	(United States) Roger Penske Racing	Ret	5	1	4	4	3	21
3	(New Zealand) Bruce McLaren	(United Kingdom) Bruce McLaren Motor Racing	2	3	Ret	3	Ret	2	20
4	(United States) Phil Hill	(United States) Chaparral Cars		4	2	1	Ret	7	18
5	(United States) Jim Hall	(United States) Chaparral Cars		DNS	Ret	2	2	Ret	12
6	(New Zealand) Chris Amon	(United Kingdom) Bruce McLaren Motor Racing	3	2	Ret	Ret	Ret	Ret	10
7	(United States) Dan Gurney	(United States) All American Racers	DNS	1	Ret	Ret	Ret	Ret	9
8	(United States) Chuck Parsons	(United States) Hilton Racing Team	6	6	3	Ret	8	Ret	6
9	(United Kingdom) Graham Hill	(United Kingdom) Team Surtees					3		4
10	(United States) Peter Revson	(United States) Drummond Racing					6	4	4
10	(Canada) John Cannon	(Canada) Ecurie Carabine	4	Ret	Ret	6	Ret	DNQ	4
11	(United States) George Follmer	(United States) John W. Mecom Jr.	5	Ret	DNS				4
11	(United States) George Follmer	(United States) George Follmer Enterprises				Ret	5	Ret	4
12	(United States) Earl Jones	(United States) Charlie Hayes Motor Racing			4	7	11		3
13	(Australia) Paul Hawkins	(United States) Epstein Enterprises	DNS	15	5	Ret	7	8	2
13	(United States) Masten Gregory	(United States) Pacesetter Homes	Ret	Ret	Ret	5	Ret	12	2
13	(West Germany) Lothar Motschenbacher	(United States) Dan Blocker	8	Ret	Ret	Ret	9	5	2
14	(Canada) Eppie Wietzes	(Canada) Comstock Racing Team	13		6				1
14	(United States) Jerry Titus	(United States) Webster Racing						6	1
Pos.	Driver	Team	MON	BRI	MOS	LAG	RIV	STA	Total

Colour	Result
Gold	Winner
Silver	Second place
Bronze	Third place
Green	Points classification
Blue	Non-points classification
Blue	Non-classified finish (NC)
Purple	Retired, not classified (Ret)
Red	Did not qualify (DNQ)
Red	Did not pre-qualify (DNPQ)
Black	Disqualified (DSQ)
White	Did not start (DNS)
White	Withdrew (WD)
White	Race cancelled (C)
Blank	Did not practice (DNP)
Blank	Did not arrive (DNA)
Blank	Excluded (EX)
