= Owen Maddock =

British engineer and racing car designer

- Maddock at work at Cooper
- Born: Owen Richard Maddock; 24 January 1925; Sutton, Surrey, England
- Died: 19 July 2000 (aged 75)
- Education: Kingston Technical College
- Occupation: Engineer
- Known for: Chief designer for the Cooper Car Company from 1950 to 1963.

Owen Richard Maddock (24 January 1925 – 19 July 2000) was a British engineer and racing car designer, who was chief designer for the Cooper Car Company between 1950 and 1963. During this time Maddock designed a string of successful racing cars, including the Formula One World Championship-winning Cooper T51 and T53 models.

The T51 was the first mid-engined car to win either the World Drivers' or Constructors' Championships, feats it achieved in the hands of Jack Brabham in 1959. A year earlier Stirling Moss had taken the first ever Formula One victory for a mid-engined car in another Maddock-designed vehicle: a Cooper T43. In addition to his Formula One work, Maddock also produced race-winning Formula Two, Formula Three and sportscar designs. After leaving Cooper in 1963 Maddock went on to a successful career as an engineering consultant, including a spell as a hovercraft designer working for Saunders-Roe on the Isle of Wight. In his spare time he also enjoyed racing hovercraft, and was a co-founder of the Hovercraft Club of Great Britain.

Away from engineering Maddock was an accomplished jazz musician. Among others, he was a part of Mick Mulligan's Magnolia Jazz Band, playing sousaphone, that featured George Melly on vocals. When the band decided to turn fully professional Maddock preferred to remain an amateur and left the group. He also counted saxophone, bass clarinet and piano among his repertoire, and continued to play and compete in jazz competitions until shortly before his death.

== Early life ==
Owen Maddock was born in Sutton, Surrey, in January 1925. He was son of the architect Richard Maddock, who spent most of his life working for Sir Herbert Baker and was overseer for Baker's most controversial project in the United Kingdom: the rebuilding and destruction of large portions of Sir John Soane's Bank of England building in the City of London. Owen Maddock grew up in Sutton, and went on to study engineering at Kingston Technical College. During this time, in the latter years of World War II, Maddock also served in the local Home Guard regiment.

In addition to his engineering studies, Maddock was a proficient musician. He was able to play a number of instruments, eventually including trombone, saxophone, bass clarinet, piano, and sousaphone. He excelled as a jazz player and was part of many jazz bands of the late 1940s and early 1950s, including The Mike Daniels Band and Mick Mulligan's Magnolia Jazz Band. As a part of the Magnolia Jazz Band, Maddock played alongside vocalist George Melly. In his own memoirs Melly remembered Maddock as "a tall man with a beard and the abrupt manner of a Hebrew prophet who has just handed on the Lord's warning to a sinful generation ... and his hands, coat, clothes and face were always streaked with oil." Melly also recalled that Maddock could take his passion for jazz to extremes:

In his bedroom was an old-fashioned wind-up gramophone above which was suspended a weight through a pulley so adjusted as to lighten the pressure of the sound-arm on the record. On this antique machine he played Bechet records even while copulating. In fact the rather faded blonde with whom he was having an affair at that time told me she found it very disconcerting that, no matter what point they had reached, if the record finished, Owen would leap off and put on another.

— George Melly, Owning Up

On graduation he gained Associate Membership of the Institution of Mechanical Engineers, but his professional development was interrupted when he was called up for two years' National Service, during which he was stationed in Germany. After demobilisation Maddock went home to Surrey, and returned to Kingston Tech in April 1948 to complete a refresher course to maintain his AMIMechE status. As a part of this course he was required to spend eighteen months in a commercial workshop. At the time, Surrey was home to quite a few of the UK's smaller road and competition automobile manufacturers – including AC, Alta and HWM – and it was to the automobile industry that Maddock directed his attention.

== The Cooper years ==
Following unsuccessful approaches to HRD and Trojan, Maddock was taken on by the Cooper Car Company, run by father and son team Charles and John Cooper. Charles Cooper had been involved in motorsport since the 1920s, having acted as racing mechanic to Kaye Don for many years, and had built John a racing special as a twelfth birthday present in 1936. Working at the family garage in Surbiton, the pair constructed their first motorcycle-engined 500 cc (31 cu in) racing car in 1946. A string of wins followed, raising the reputation of the Cooper 500 to such an extent that they were able to begin selling replicas to fellow competitors.

Despite their growing popularity, by the time Maddock joined the company in September 1948 they were still not large enough to be able to justify taking on a full-time engineer. In addition to his drafting duties Maddock therefore also filled the roles of fitter, storekeeper and van driver, among many. Gradually the Coopers began to make more use of Maddock's drafting skills, however, realising that having proper technical drawings was preferable to sketching designs to full scale on the walls, where they were frequently painted over! Some smaller parts were fabricated from crude sketches, or frequently simply by eye. During his time with Cooper Maddock became renowned for the detail and artistry of his blueprints, and with a talent for lateral thinking his contribution to the design of Cooper's cars grew rapidly. By the time of Cooper's heyday the design process was essentially a three-way tag match between Maddock, John Cooper and star driver Jack Brabham. Maddock's protégé and eventual successor, Eddie Stait, later recalled to historian Doug Nye that "John had a lot of the original ideas and then Owen would add some very original thinking in developing those ideas; they were a team ... and Jack of course contributed a lot."

Unusually for the time Maddock sported a full beard. As a result of this he quickly became known around the Cooper establishment as "The Beard", while to Charles Cooper he would always be "Whiskers". His mercurial temperament and volatile temper sometimes grated against his employers' nerves. Once, when a potential new recruit arrived for a job interview, Charles Cooper asked his secretary whether he had a beard. On being told that he did, Cooper told her to "Send 'im home. I've got enough trouble with the one I've got!".

=== Early Formula Three and Formula Two work ===
Eventually Maddock was installed in his own drawing office within the Cooper building, although it was somewhat cramped, being located beneath the works stores. Initially, Maddock's duties revolved around drawing or redrawing existing components and developing refinements on the existing Cooper 500 and 1000 cars. However, in 1953 Maddock was instrumental in introducing two design features that became Cooper trademarks for the rest of the decade: the curved-tube chassis frame and the "curly leaf" leaf spring location bracket. The car that both of these design innovations were pioneered on was the Mark VIII version of the Cooper 500 Formula Three machine.

==== The curved-tube chassis ====
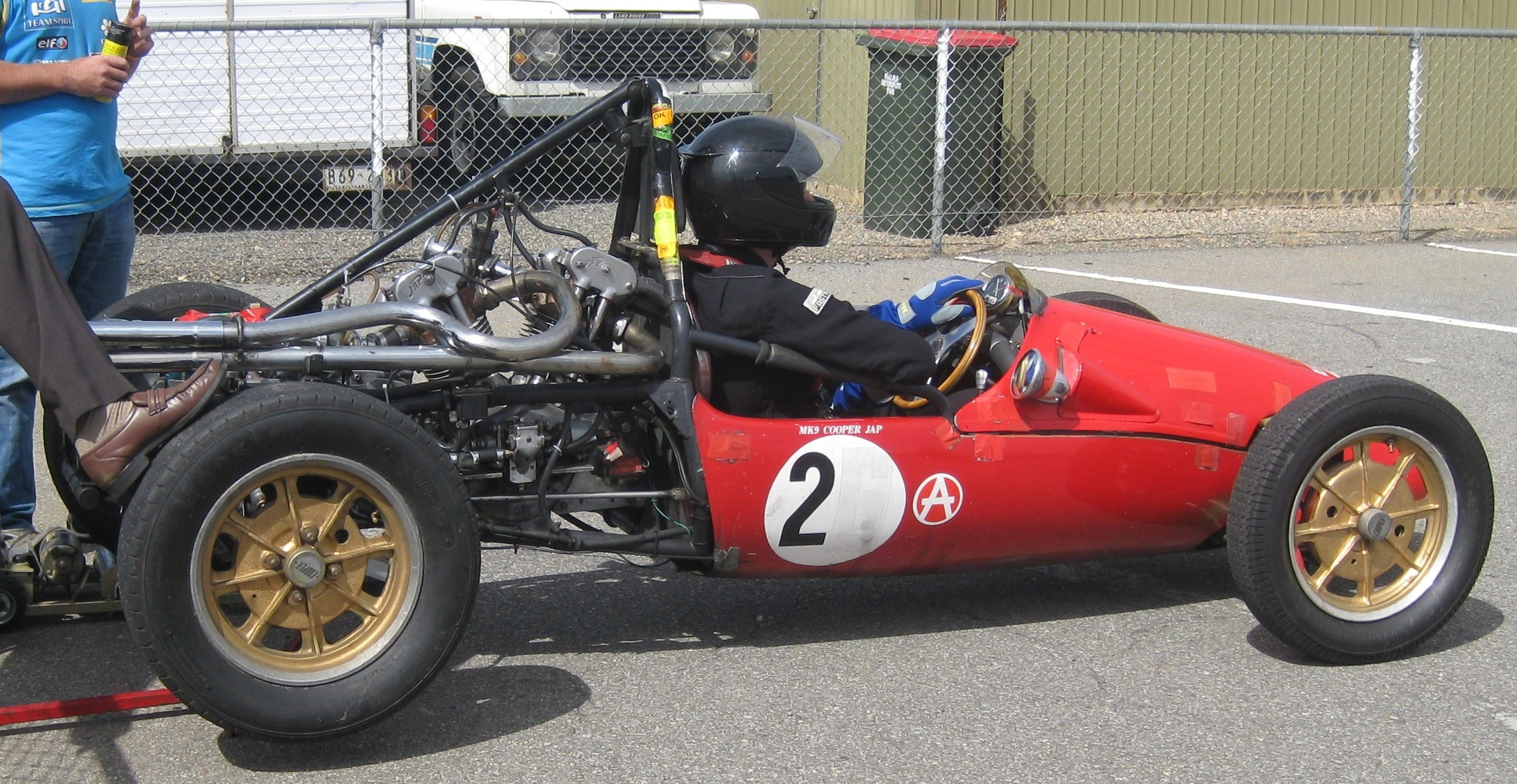
A Mk. IX Cooper 1100, fitted with a JAP V-twin engine. The curved chassis tubes (black) can be seen above and below the engine crankcase.

The curved-tube chassis was the more controversial of the two novel ideas. The existing Cooper 500 chassis design process had been one of evolution since the earliest production 500s rolled out of the Surbiton works in 1947, and had been based on simple, traditional twin longitudinal box-section ladder frame. With the introduction of the Mark V in 1950 this was augmented by a beefed-up and stiffened body support structure, creating a semi-space frame chassis. This was refined further over the next two years, with the Mark VI marking a switch to equally sized tubular upper and lower longerons, and the Mark VIIA introducing tubular upright sections as well. However, for 1953's Mark VIII the Coopers decided to start afresh with a completely new chassis design.

A true space frame design uses only straight tubes, properly triangulated to pass loads either in tension or compression. Following proper engineering practice, when he started to develop plans for the new chassis design Maddock sketched out various straight-tubed space frame designs. However, when he showed each to Charlie Cooper his response was "Nah, Whiskers, that's not it..." Frustrated, Maddock finally went away and drew a frame in which every tube was bent. To his surprise, rather than dismissing it Cooper's reaction was to snatch the plans out of Maddock's hands and exclaim "That's it..." Although the curved tube design broke several engineering rules Maddock and the Coopers later rationalised their decision. Their arguments were that curved tubes could be located and routed so as to leave adequate space for mechanical components, and as the tubes could be run close under the car's bodywork this could be attached directly to the frame, saving the weight and complexity of a dedicated bodywork frame. Although the idea started as a joke Maddock would later defend the design, even in the teeth of strong criticism from Cooper's star driver Jack Brabham. Brabham would come to recall that Maddock was latterly an even more staunch defender of the curved-tube concept than Charles Cooper.

==== Moving into Formula One ====
The first Cooper car to enter a Formula One Grand Prix was Harry Schell's Mark IV, fitted with an 1,100 cc (67 cu in) V-twin engine, at the 1950 Monaco Grand Prix. However, Maddock's contribution to this design was minor. Cooper's conventionally front-engined Cooper Bristol cars also contested a number of World Championship Grands Prix during the Championship's Formula Two years in 1952 and 1953. Mike Hawthorn's notoriously rapid example took fourth place in the 1952 Belgian Grand Prix to earn the first world championship points for Cooper, and third place in the 1952 British Grand Prix. The design of the Cooper Bristol was largely based on that of the Mark V Formula Three car, though, with Maddock principally acting as a draughtsman.

===== Vanwall Special =====
Ironically, Owen Maddock's first bespoke Formula One design wasn't actually produced for the Cooper Car Company's own use. In early 1953 industrialist, and owner of the Norton Motorcycle Company, Tony Vandervell approached the Coopers to obtain their assistance in building a chassis for his forthcoming racing engine. Vandervell had been one of the early backers of the British Racing Motors project, but had become disillusioned with the management of that enterprise and had decided to strike out on his own.

The resulting Vanwall Special (the Cooper T30, according to factory records) was built at the Cooper factory and used a similar front-engined chassis design to Cooper's own Formula Two machines, but was designed from the ground up by Maddock. The chassis was described by test driver Alan Brown as being much more taut and well engineered than previous Cooper products. Brown gave the car its race debut in May 1954 at the International Trophy meeting at Silverstone Circuit. He was running as high as third place before an oil pipe coupling failed and forced the car into retirement. For the Championship season Vandervell employed the up-and-coming Peter Collins to drive the car. Seventh place at the 1954 Italian Grand Prix and second in the non-Championship Goodwood Trophy race were the best he achieved, before he wrote the vehicle off during practice for the Spanish Grand Prix that October.

A further four chassis were constructed to Maddock's design the following year, in Vandervell's own Vanwall racing team's premises across the River Thames in Acton, London. However, they wouldn't prove competitive until after a thorough redesign by Team Lotus's Colin Chapman in 1956. The Vanwall cars went on to take the inaugural World Constructors' Championship in 1958, but by that time Cooper themselves were making inroads into the Formula One establishment.

===== 'Bob-tail' sportscar =====
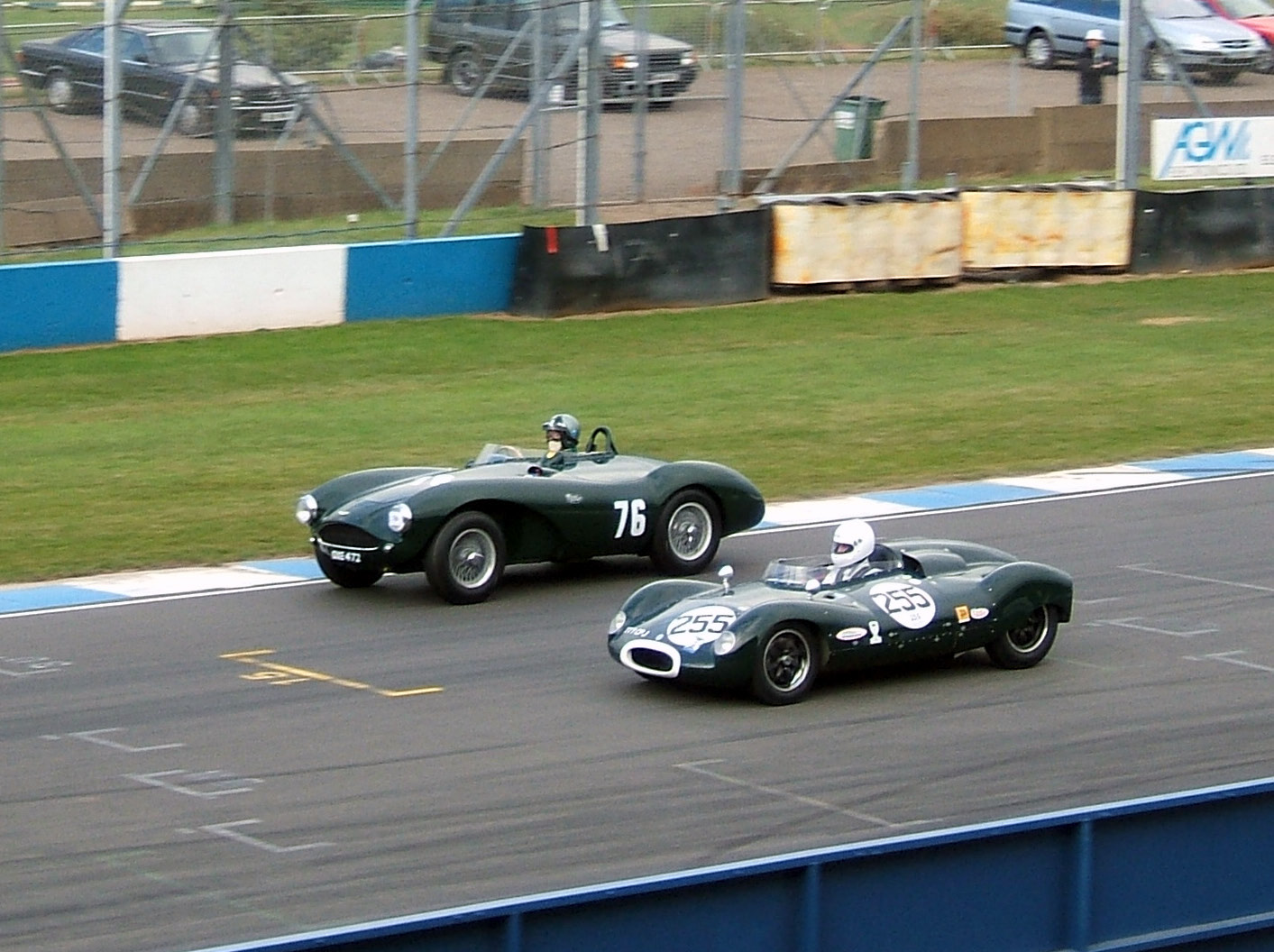
A Cooper T39 'Bob-tail' (right) alongside an Aston Martin DB3S, during a historic race meeting at Donington Park in 2007

Cooper's own route into Formula One was somewhat unorthodox. Following on from producing the Vanwall Maddock began work on a new sportscar, designed around Coventry Climax's new FWA 1,098 cc inline-four engine. Maddock and John Cooper decided to adapt the Mark IX Formula Three chassis to accept the larger, more powerful engine, retaining the engine mounted behind the driver and the driver's seat on the car's centre-line, per the single-seater's arrangement. The T39 chassis consequently featured Cooper's curved tube design, with the upper longerons sweeping up from the front suspension mounts, passing on either side of the driving position and engine, before looping back down the rear suspension. The passenger seat, mandated by sportscar rules of the time, was mounted outboard of the chassis on the driver's left.

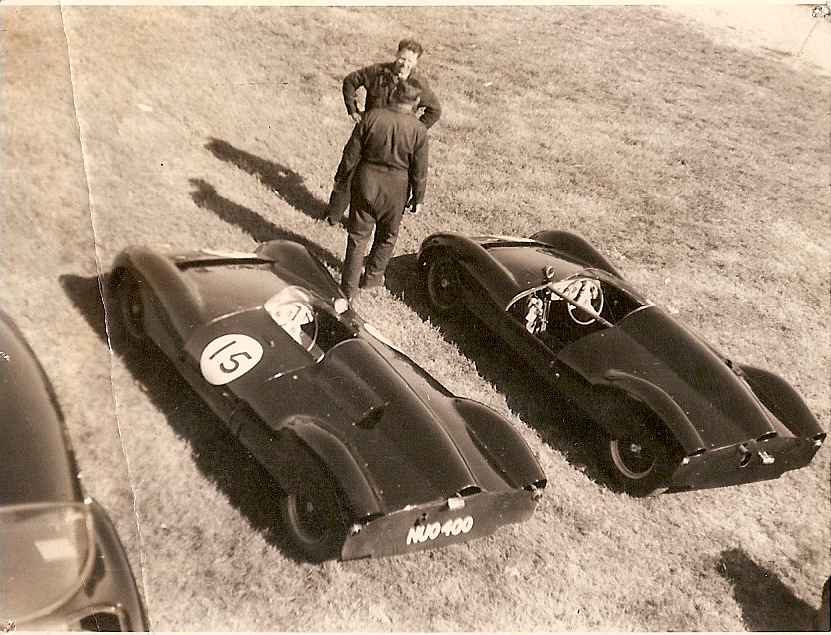
Two Equipe Endeavour T39 cars at Goodwood in 1955, clearly showing their flat, near-vertical, Kamm tail

The car gained its nickname from Maddock's unusual bodywork design. While the front of the car was relatively conventional, the rear featured an abbreviated, Kamm tail design. Maddock had been studying the theories of Professor Wunibald Kamm and decided to implement such an arrangement on the new car. Although the Kamm theory gained far wider application in the 1960s, in the mid-1950s the styling resulting from Professor Kamm's work was striking. The chopped-off look of the car's tail gained the new T39 sportscar the nicknames "Manx" and "bob-tail". John Cooper was, however, somewhat sceptical of the new silhouette, and regularly explained away its lack of tail by telling enquirers that "we had to cut it off because it wouldn't fit in the transporter otherwise".

In addition to being a highly competitive racing car, the Cooper Bob-tail was to form the basis for Cooper's first true attempt to enter the World Championship in their own right. Jack Brabham had gained a strong reputation as a racer in his native Australia driving a lightly modified Cooper Bristol which he branded the RedeX Special. On moving to the UK he picked up where he had left off, driving a Cooper-Alta in domestic British series. Brabham's visits to the Cooper works to collect spares led to collaboration with the Cooper outfit, and subsequently wholesale integration with the Cooper works team. Eventually, he persuaded the Coopers to allow him to create a Formula One version of the T39 chassis around a 2-litre Bristol engine. Brabham, working almost alone on the car, completed the Formula One special the day before its first race: the 1955 British Grand Prix at Aintree Circuit. Although the car's engine failed on this first outing, subsequent development proved that the rear-engined Cooper was competitive with the Formula One machinery of the day, ultimately winning the 1955 Australian Grand Prix, and paved the way for the Cooper works to develop a proper slipper-bodied challenger.

==== The first true Formula One Coopers ====
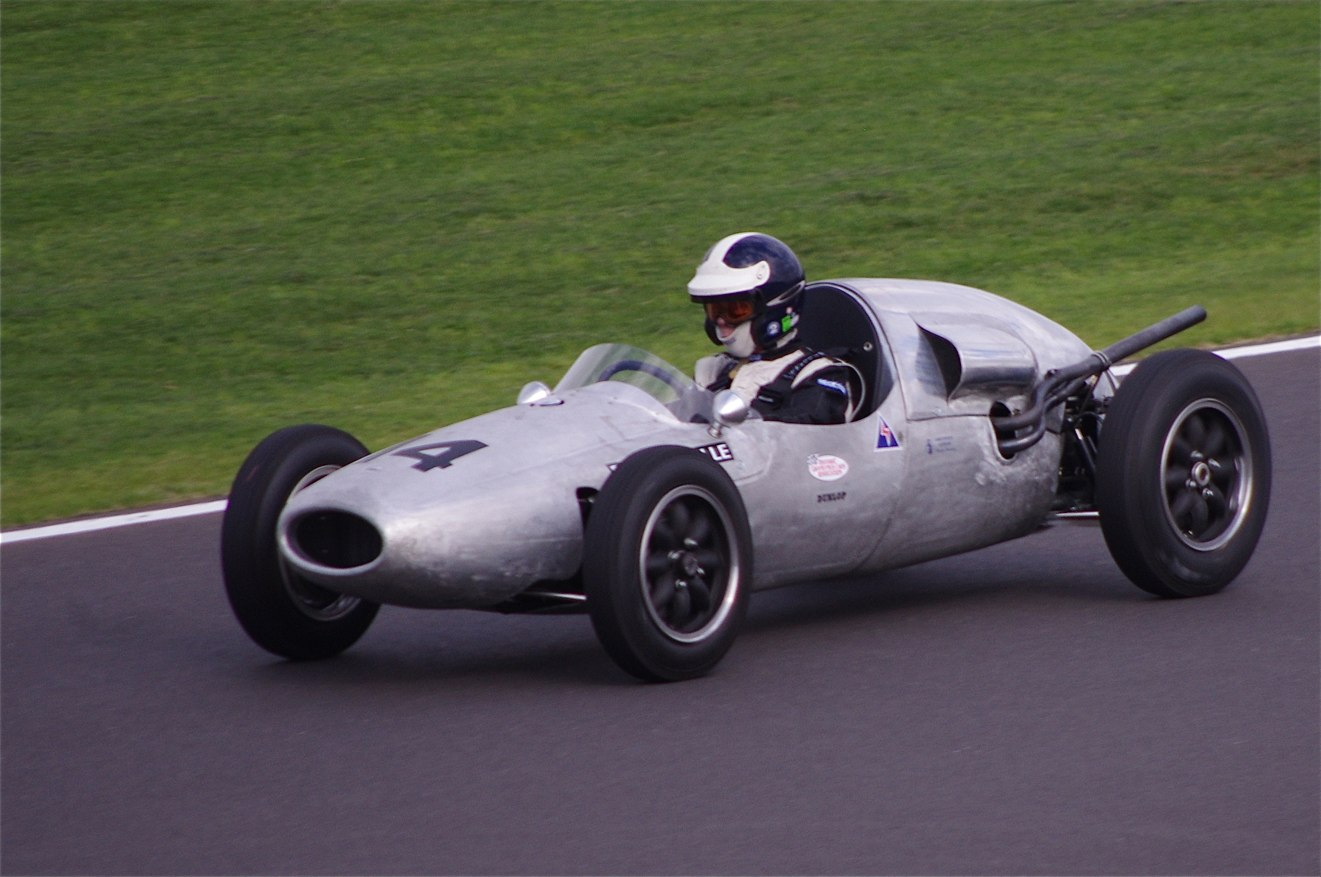
Cooper T41 at the Silverstone Classic in 2011

Taking cues from Brabham's Formula One special, and through evolution of the Formula Three curved tube chassis design, Maddock produced a new Formula Two design for 1956: the Cooper T41. He developed this the subsequent year into the Mark II, or Cooper T43, model. Where the 1956 car had been developed for Climax's FWB, this 1957 car was intended for Climax's new FPF four-cylinder engine. While the FWB was a development of a pump engine adapted for automobile use, the FPF was a bespoke, dry sumped racing design. Even in 1,500 cc (92 cu in) Formula Two form Maddock's lightweight cars could produce strong performances against more powerful machinery, but the true potential of the design was shown when Rob Walker Racing decided to build a T43 with an enlarged 1964 cc FPF engine – and the works entered it for the 1957 Monaco Grand Prix. Driver Jack Brabham unfortunately managed to write the chassis off in practice, but the engine was transferred to another T43 present for the Formula Two race and Brabham managed to qualify 13th for the 16 car race. In the race itself Brabham climbed as high as third place, behind the Maserati 250F of Juan Manuel Fangio and the Vanwall of Tony Brooks, before the little car's fuel pump failed on its 100th lap. Determined to finish Brabham pushed the car from the tunnel, the full distance of the Monaco marina, to the finish line. He was sixth, only one place out of the points, but better was to come.

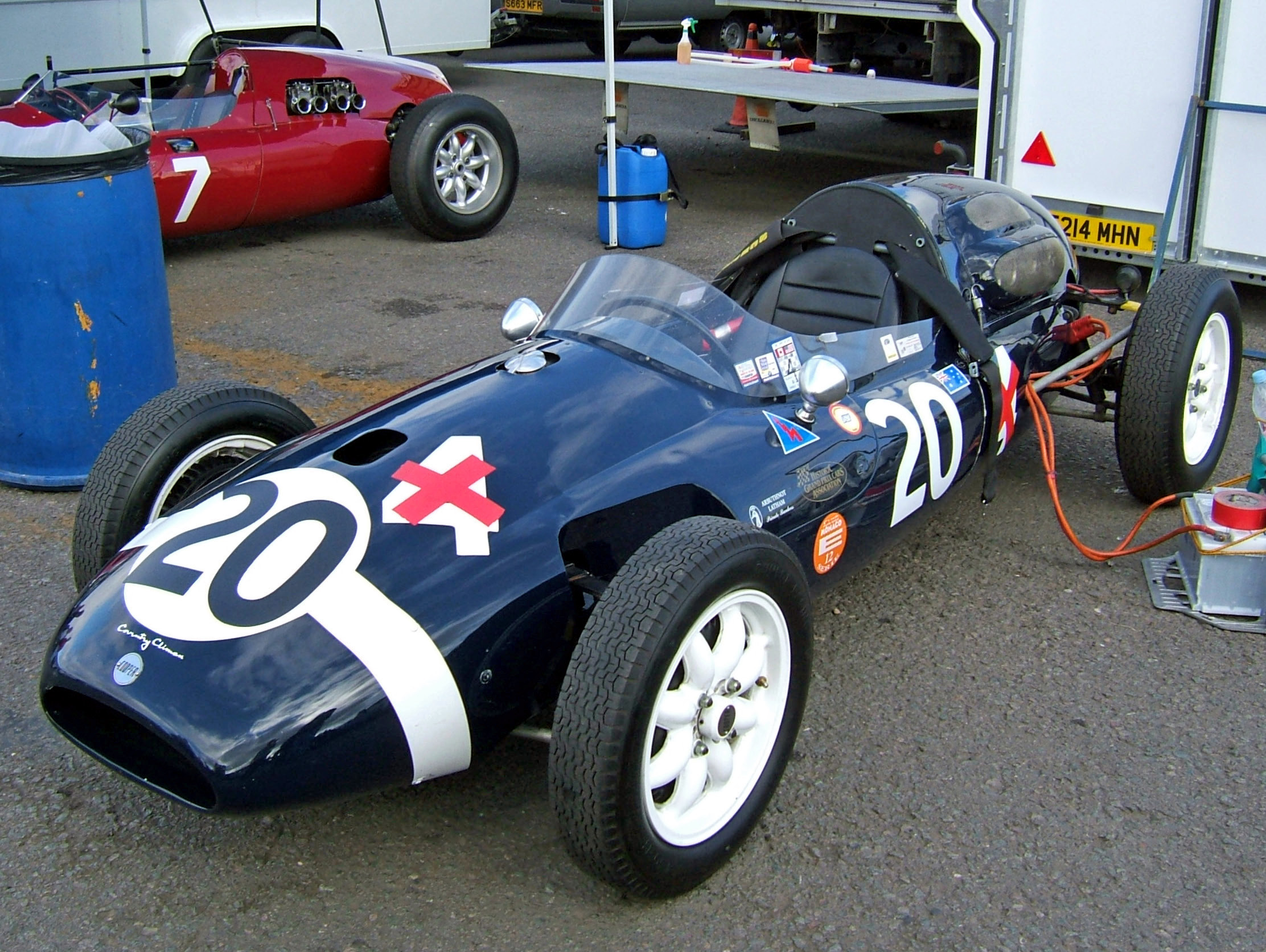
The Rob Walker Racing 1958 Argentine Grand Prix-winning Cooper T43.

For the first races of 1958 Walker retook possession of the modified car and, running on AvGas, Stirling Moss drove it to victory in the Formula One season opening 1958 Argentine Grand Prix. This was the first victory at the highest level for a Cooper car, the first in World Championship history for a car that had its engine mounted behind the driver, and came against rivals running full-capacity 2.5 L (153 cu in) engines. More was to come.

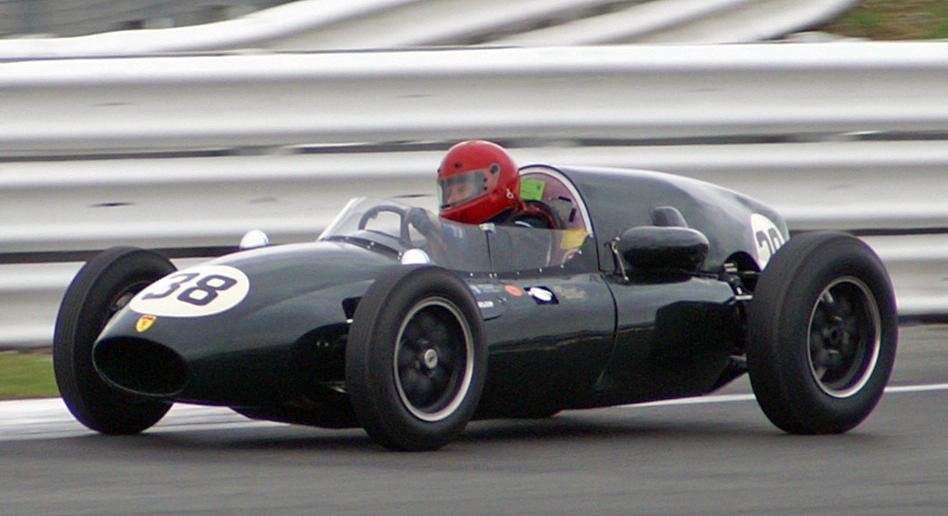
Cooper T45 at Silverstone Classic 2009

Almost immediately the T43 design was replaced by the Mark III version of the "Formula Two" chassis. Maddock and the Coopers upgraded the existing design by switching the front suspension for an improved double wishbone suspension arrangement with coilover shock absorbers, in place of the older cars' transverse leaf spring design. New step-up gears in the transaxle allowed Maddock to lower the engine (now including Climax's stretched 2,207 cc (134.7 cu in) FPF in the works Formula One car), reducing the centre of gravity of the new Cooper T45 (Mark III) by mounting the dry-sump engine much lower. Maddock credited this particular innovation to Jack Brabham, who received the suggestion from his Australian friend, Ron Tauranac. Brabham and Cooper contributed other detail improvements, but Maddock left the fundamental chassis frame virtually unaltered from the T43. The T45 was immediately successful. In the hands of Maurice Trintignant, Rob Walker's new T45 won the very next World Championship round, the 1958 Monaco Grand Prix.

Maddock had a somewhat frosty relationship with Jack Brabham. Brabham recalled Maddock as being "even more steadfastly conservative than Charlie [Cooper] himself." This was in stark contrast to Brabham's own character, and his desire to win at any cost. The two clashed particularly over the curved tube chassis design, but the T45 had shown what could be achieved when the pair collaborated, and between the two of them they were to elevate Cooper to the top of the Formula One pack in the next few years.

==== Formula One World Champions ====
Further minor refinements were made to the T45 chassis through 1958, and for the 1959 Formula One season Maddock finally brought these together with a full 2.5 L version of the FPF engine to form the Cooper T51, which would come to dominate the season's racing. The Cooper works drivers, Brabham and young New Zealander Bruce McLaren, took three World Championship victories and a total of eight podium finishes between them from the 1959 Championship's nine events. With additional points contributed by a further two victories from Moss and two other podium finishes by Trintignant in Rob Walker's new T51s, Cooper-Climax finished the year as the World Constructors' Champions, following on from fellow British team Vanwall the year before.

The T51 was far from perfect, however, and its Citroen-based gearbox was a particular Achilles heel.

==== Cooper's declining years ====
The 1961 Formula One season saw the introduction of radically revised engine regulations. Maximum capacity was cut from 1954-1960's 2.5 L to only 1.5 L (92 cu in), greatly reducing the power and torque available, but also bringing fuel economy and weight benefits. This change required Formula One chassis designers to rethink their approach to a car's whole construction as poor handling and excess weight could no longer be effectively compensated for by greater engine output. Cooper suffered their first season without a Championship race win since 1958, and finished only fourth in the World Constructors' Championship.

With the introduction of the smaller engines came a need for a less heavily built gearbox that would offer six ratios to choose between, to keep the engine within its narrower torque band. Following an interim six-speed update of the C5S model, Maddock set about a complete redesign to produce the new C6S. Although the new gearbox was just as reliable as the five speed model, its mechanism was extremely complex and proved unpopular with the mechanics who were tasked with maintaining it.

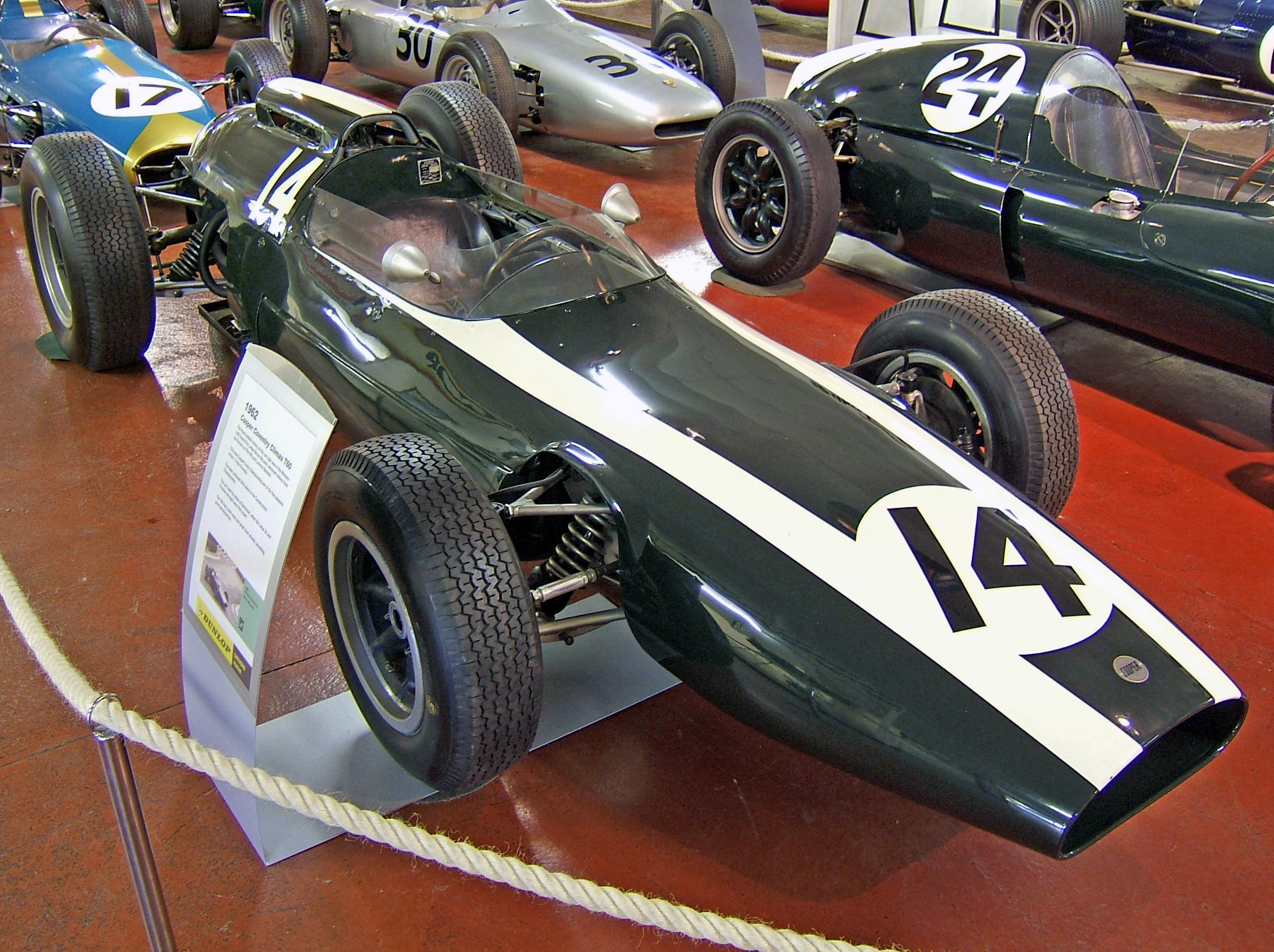
A Cooper T60, the last Maddock-designed car to win a World Championship Grand Prix

Brabham's departure to found his own team at the end of 1961 not only deprived the Cooper equipe of its main driving talent, but also a major contribution to the design talent of the works. Bruce McLaren was also an able engineer – who also later founded his own eponymous team – but Cooper never found the same success as they had enjoyed during the Australian's tenure. Maddock and McLaren's Cooper T60 car of 1962 provided Cooper with its last works victory in Cooper ownership, when McLaren took first place at the 1962 Monaco Grand Prix, but British rivals Lotus and BRM had taken the engineering initiative and Cooper started a lengthy decline in performance.

The introduction of the monocoque chassied Lotus 25 during the 1962 season, and its dominance in the hands of Jim Clark during 1963, highlighted the shortcomings of its spaceframe rivals, including the new Cooper T66. To counteract this, urged on by John Cooper, Maddock started to develop Cooper's own monocoque car. Maddock's design not only followed strict monocoque principles, but also included some very advanced composite technology. The outer, stressed skin was, like the Lotus, formed from sheet aluminium. However, to support this skin, rather than using traditional bulkheads and metal ribs, Maddock specified a lining of aviation-grade honeycomb structure aluminium with a fibreglass inner skin, forming a sandwich structured composite. The resulting chassis (sometimes referred to as the Cooper T69) was far stiffer than previous Cooper products, but with variable wall thicknesses and bonded-in fuel cells it was complex to manufacture. With development over runs and limited finances Cooper decided to drop the concept. It would be 16 years until a car using the same technology won the World Championship: the Williams FW07 of 1980.

Long before this time, however, Maddock had had enough. Feeling trapped by his role at Cooper, and wanting to try his hand at something new, he resigned in August 1963.

== Later life and career ==
On his departure from Cooper Owen Maddock took up a post as a designer with Saunders-Roe, a large aeronautical engineering company based on the Isle of Wight. Maddock moved down to the island and settled in Cowes, near to the Saunders-Roe factory. He would remain in Cowes for the rest of his life. Maddock had been drawn to the firm because of its leading role in the development of the hovercraft; he had also maintained an interest in aeronautics since taking up gliding as a hobby few years previously. Maddock remained with the company after it was merged with other Westland Aircraft hovercraft engineering concerns and Vickers-Armstrong to form the British Hovercraft Corporation. However, when the industry hit a downturn Maddock was made redundant. He later joined propulsion and light engineering specialists Elliott Turbo Machinery.

=== Racing hovercraft ===
In December 1963 a letter written by Owen Maddock appeared in Flight International's Air-Cushion Vehicles (ACV) supplement, wherein he stated that he was "extremely interested in air-cushion vehicles and would welcome an opportunity to work on the design and development of such a craft intended for racing ... Anyone interested?" Someone was indeed interested, and as early as January the next year Maddock and fellow ACV racing evangelist David Stevens had contacted Stirling Moss to solicit his opinion as to whether racing ACVs would be a popular proposition. Following a positive response, later in 1964 Maddock and a number of other amateur enthusiasts set up the Isle of Wight Hover Club, and then early in 1966 the national umbrella group the Hover Club of Great Britain that would become the Hovercraft Club of Great Britain. Maddock acted as technical secretary for the clubs for many years.

In his professional role as a freelance engineering consultant Maddock was also involved in hovercraft design. In 1967 he was commissioned by the John Player & Sons cigarette company to design and build a prototype racing hovercraft. The craft appeared later in the year as the Player's No. 6 Prototype, driven by young female driver Sarah Mayhew, "hover girl". The No.6 Prototype was designed to be simple and cheap to construct, intended to encourage amateur homebuilders to attempt to construct their own hovercraft using its design. Maddock lightly modified and productionised the Player's No. 6 design for CanaHover Ltd. of Ottawa, Canada. They sold two versions of their Hoverover: a tandem two-seat recreational model, and a single-seat freight carrying model.

=== Later racing car design work ===
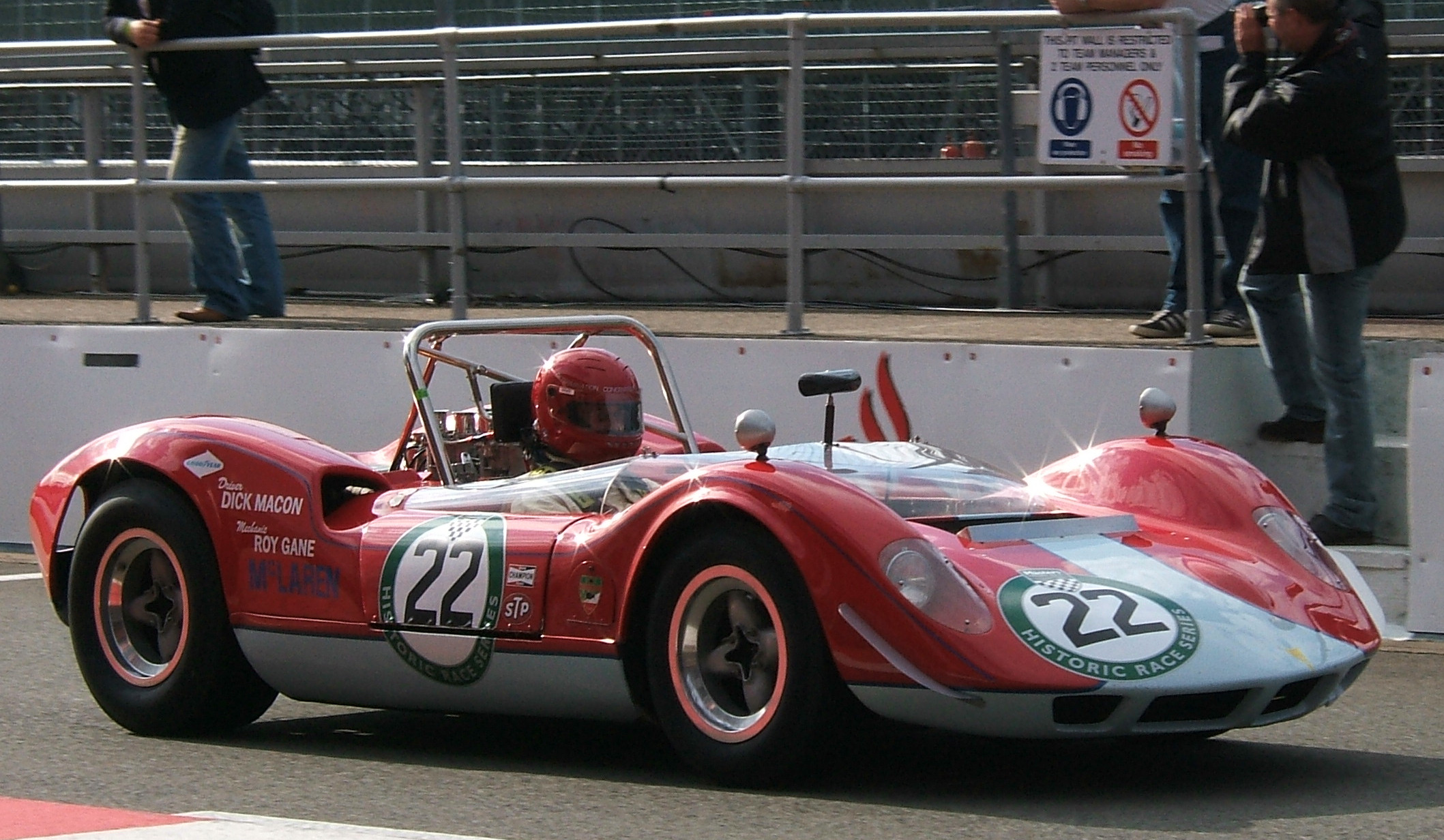
A 1964 McLaren M1A sports car; Maddock's first significant design after leaving Cooper. Sporting the Maddock-penned four-spoke racing wheel.

Despite his newfound enthusiasm for hovercraft Maddock remained connected to the auto racing world long after his departure from Cooper. Initially, on leaving Cooper Maddock was co-opted as a freelance engineering consultant by Bruce McLaren and Teddy Mayer's new Bruce McLaren Motor Racing team. In addition to providing detailing for McLaren's 1964 Tasman Series Cooper T70 cars, Maddock was heavily involved in the design of the first true McLaren racing car: the McLaren M1A sports car of 1964. He worked on many aspects of the car's design, but perhaps his most lasting contribution to the future success of McLaren in sports car racing was his design for the McLaren four-spoke cast racing wheel. This wheel was exceptionally stiff, the best available at the time, and would go on to become something of a hallmark of McLaren racing cars in many different series over the following decade.

More freelance work followed later for the newly established March Engineering constructor, with March even offering to take Maddock on full-time. He preferred to remain a freelance, however, and declined their proposal.

=== Final years and death ===
Owen Maddock had always been a prodigious walker and cyclist, despite being asthmatic, and remained active until very shortly before his death. In later years, following the decline of the British hovercraft industry, employment had become hard to find and so Maddock returned to his love of jazz. He played woodwind instruments for various local groups, and regularly competed on the piano in jazz competitions. Maddock died in Cowes on 19 July 2000.
