= Monterey Motorsports Reunion =

Annual event

Logo

The Rolex Monterey Motorsports Reunion is an annual event held at WeatherTech Raceway Laguna Seca in Monterey, California. Its purpose is to provide an event in which historic racecars can compete. It takes place over the course of one weekend every mid-August. It was first established by Steve Earle in 1974 as the Monterey Historic Automobile Races. Earle organized the meeting for his friends to race their cars at Laguna Seca. The event, known as the Monterey Historics until 2010, acts as a part of Monterey Car Week, which includes the Pebble Beach Concours d'Elegance and other events.

Approximately 550 cars participate in the event.

Due to the COVID-19 pandemic, the 2020 event was canceled.

== Sponsorship ==
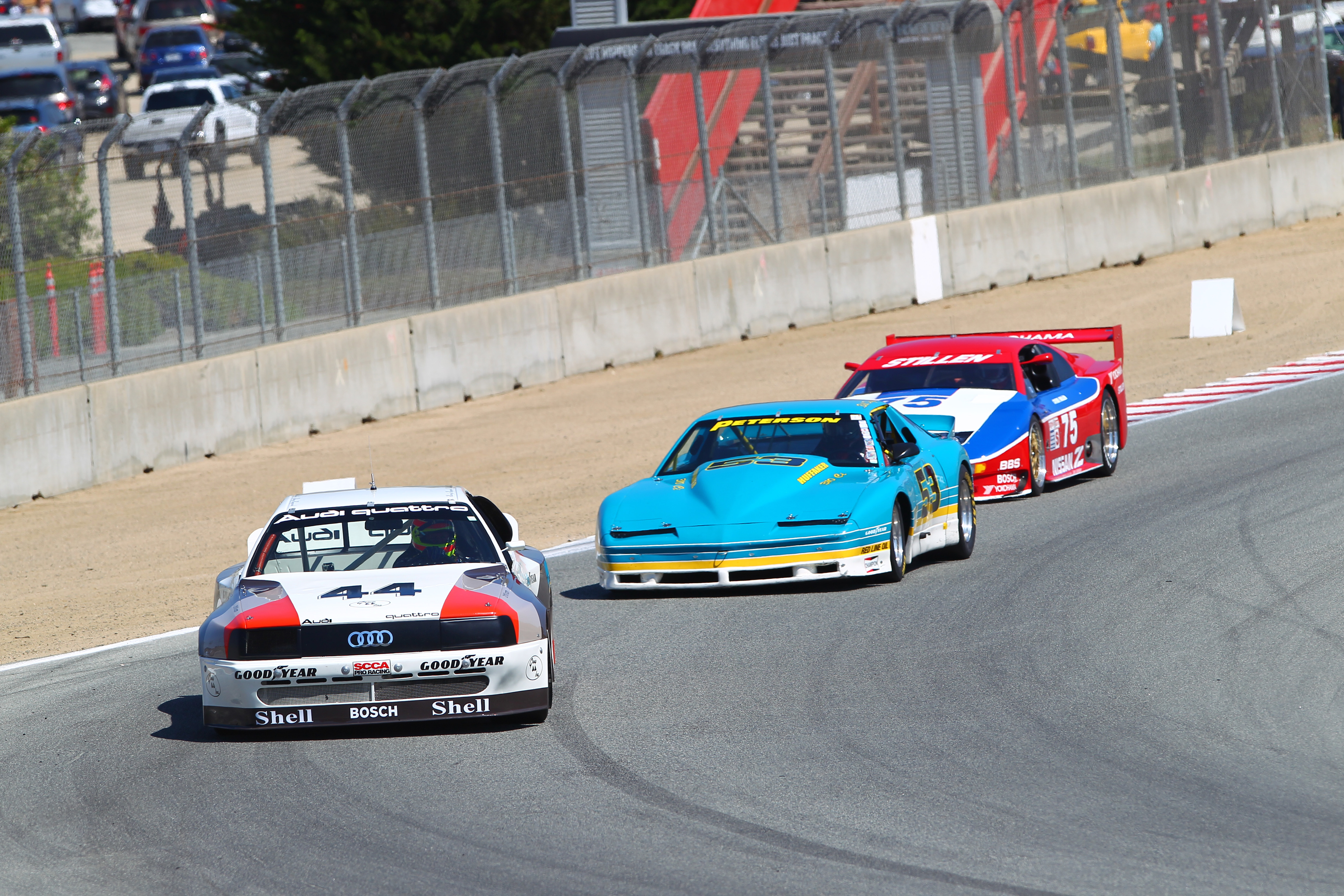
2018 Monterey Motorsports Reunion

The first company to sponsor the event was the Chrysler Corporation. Later, the event added a sponsorship from Rolex. The Chrysler sponsorship was replaced with one from Toyota, who sponsored the event from 2006 to 2008.

== Awards ==
Although celebrities and professional drivers do attend, the Reunion is not a professional event, and has no awards or prizes for finishing position. Each Saturday and Sunday afternoon race has a Rolex Award winner voted by committee. Two of the morning races each day honor a Bonham's Cup winner similarly chosen. There are special Awards for best paddock display, best Ford-powered car, outstanding craftsmanship, etc. The highest honor is the Rolex Spirit of Monterey Award, A Rolex watch and original Bill Patterson painting, presented to the entrant who best embodies the spirit of the event in their presentation and competition drive.

== In magazines ==
The Reunion has been featured in Autoweek magazine. It was featured in an online article in early August 2008 and in the September 2008 issue. The 2003 event was featured in an issue of Popular Mechanics. Popular Mechanics also documented the 2000 event. The 2009 event was also featured.

The 2010 event was featured in an issue of Road & Track. The 2004 event was also featured in an article on the R&T website.

== Telecasts ==
For many years television network Speed Channel provided coverage of the event. For a few years the coverage consisted of several different episodes featuring the major groups (IMSA, Trans Am, F1, and Can Am). In later years the event was abridged to one episode combining behind-the-scenes coverage with coverage of select races. The races covered were a mix of the major groups and some of the GT groups for better interest. If the featured a one-time race group, that race may be covered. The Reunion was for a while covered by Fox Sports 1, which replaced Speed in August 2013.

== Internet ==
In recent years the Reunion has been livestreamed by Motor Trend magazine, with the coverage being shown on YouTube.

== Race groups ==
Various race groups from multiple eras and types of automobile racing are featured at the Monterey Reunion. The groups often contain vehicles that competed against one another during that point in history.

Race Group	Year Range	Notes
Sports, racing, and touring cars	1900–1939	Formerly also included a race group featuring grand prix and Indianapolis 500 vehicles.
Grand touring cars	1947–1969	Formerly also featured general production sports cars not originally used in motorsport. Divided into under and over 2 or 2.5 liter race groups. Usually divided by era.
Sports racing cars	1947–1969	Prototype racecars and racing specials divided in the same format as the GT cars.
Trans Am Series	1966–1972	Over two liter class. Occasionally features a few under two liter vehicles.
Can Am Series	1966–1974	In recent years has been combined with other prototype groups.
FIA Manufacturers Championship	1962–1979	Endurance prototypes. Sometimes combined with other prototype groups. Usually divided into two separate race groups, one for the 1960s and one for the 1970s.
Formula One	1966–1984	The three liter era.
IMSA GT Championship	1971–1992	Divided into IMSA GT/GTX/AAGT/GTU, IMSA GTO, and IMSA GTP. Also features a few GT cars from before 1971 of similar technology. Sometimes combined with 1970s prototypes. The GTOs will often be combined with the GTPs due to their greater performance. Cars of the Trans Am Series from 1973 to 1992 (called "SCCA") are combined with the IMSA GTO cars due to similar technology.
IndyCar	1963–1978	
Formula Junior	1958-63	A group featuring low displacement formula cars, sometimes including Formula Vee, Formula Ford, and Formula 2
Formula 5000	1968-1976	The original SCCA-sanctioned series based on F1 cars but using the five liter maximum instead of F1's three liter.
Endurance Legends	1981-2007	Includes a combination of IMSA GTPs, Daytona Prototypes, and American Le Mans Series prototypes
IROC	1973-2006	Features former Winston Cup Series star drivers

=== Combined class ===
Occasionally the schedule will feature combined-class races, such as the sports racing cars competing alongside the GT cars. While these two groups race simultaneously, they do not compete against each other, much like in professional racing.

=== Former groups ===
- Previously the event featured a mixed "GT and production cars" race group in which professionally raced grand tourers competed against unmodified sports cars of the same era. The unmodified cars have since been phased out.
- In the past the prewar groups were divided into two types: production (sports, racing, and touring) and single-seater (Indy roadsters and grand prix). The latter has since been merged with the racing cars. The sports and racing cars were also merged and ultimately combined with the touring cars.
- United States Road Racing Championship- a former name for the sports racing cars

== Special race groups ==
The Reunion also features special or expanded race groups in an attempt to generate greater interest from its spectators. These often one-time groups have included Grand National and Winston Cup Series stock cars, an under two liter Trans Am Series race group, and a Formula Atlantic group. Single-marque spec groups have also been featured. In 2011 an all Jaguar XKE race was featured to commemorate that model's fiftieth anniversary. The same was done in 2012 for the Shelby Cobra, featuring small block AC Cobras racing against the big block Shelby 427 Cobras. In 2013 an all Porsche 911 "Weissach Cup" was featured to commemorate the fiftieth anniversary of the 911.

Event year	Race Group	Year Range	Notes
	Bugatti Grand Prix	1900–1939	Featured several times in lieu of having a proper Bugatti tribute, as the only Bugatti vehicles available are prewar cars.
2007	Ferrari	1956–1971	One race featuring those with drum brakes and another featuring those with disc brakes.
2008	Formula Junior	1958–1963	Several races commemorating Formula Jr.'s "golden jubilee".
2009	several race groups		featured a large amount of Porsches, the featured marque
2010	Grand National Stock Cars	1966–1972	With drum brakes.
2010	Trans Am Series	1966–1972	Under 2000cc group.
2010	Formula One	1966–1984	Expanded group in commemoration of F1's sixtieth anniversary.
2011	Jaguar E-Type	1961–1970	Commemorating the model's fiftieth anniversary.
2012	Winston Cup Series	1974–1990	Those with disc brakes. A continuation from the previous Grand National group.
2012	Cobra	1962–1969	289 AC Cobras racing alongside 427 Shelby Cobras in tribute to the Cobra's fiftieth anniversary.
2013	Porsche 911	1964–1974	In commemoration of the 911's fiftieth anniversary and coinciding with the Rennsport reunion. Called the "Weissach Cup".
2014	Formula Atlantic	1974–1980	
2015	Formula 5000	1968–1976	
2015	Shelby GT350	1965–1970	In commemoration of the model's fiftieth anniversary.
2016	Trans Am	1966–1972	Expanded group in commemoration of the series' 50th anniversary. This includes the addition of a Ford Falcon and a Pontiac Tempest.
2016	Grand Touring Cars Under 2500cc	1961–1966	Expanded to include a notable amount of under two liter Trans Am cars in commemoration of the series' 50th anniversary. These include BMW 2002s, 1960s Porsche 911s, Lotus Cortinas, and Alfa Romeo Giulias.
2016	IMSA GT	1971–1991	Expanded to include later model IMSA racecars, including those used in the American Le Mans Series, in commemoration of BMW's centennial. This included the addition of a BMW V12 LMR to compete against the GTPs.
2017	Formula Junior	1958–1963	Divided into 1958-60 and 1961-63 race groups. The former features front-engined cars with drum brakes and the latter features cars with disc brakes. Expanded class commemorating the "diamond jubilee" of Formula Jr.
2018	Formula 5000	1968–1976	
2018	IMSA GT	1973–1981	Expanded to include a large amount of Datsuns, as Nissan was the featured marque.
2018	GT Cars under 2500cc	1961–1966	Expanded to include a large amount of Datsuns, especially the Datsun 510. Other under two liter Trans Am cars were also featured.
2019	Formula Ford	1967-1981	Resembles their usual Formula Jr. group
2019	Sports Racers	1969-1984	Resembles their usual FIA Manufacturers Championship groups
2019	Formula One	1966-1985	Featuring competitors from a "Masters Championship" of historic racing
2023	open wheel racecars	1927-1955	Includes cars previously used in prewar grand prix and Indy roadster groups
2024	ragtime racers	prewar racecars	exhibition race
2025	IROC	1973–2006	Participants are almost entirely former Winston Cup Series drivers
2025	saloon cars	1955-1969	most participants use cars from the two liter Trans Am group

== Featured marques ==
In 1975, the event introduced the tradition of honoring a "featured marque" each year. This tribute is done through various ways. These include an increased number of entered vehicles from that marque, special displays of the marque's history and some of the brand's vehicles (past and/or present, with the former sometimes featuring entered vehicles), and sometimes spec races only featuring vehicles from the marque being tributed. Occasionally the event will have special one-time tributes. These have included Can Am team Chaparral Cars and racing legend Juan Manuel Fangio.

Year	Marque	Country	Notes
1974	None		
1975	Alfa Romeo	Italy	First featured marque; 65th anniversary. First time a marque's anniversary is tributed.
1976	Jaguar	Britain	
1977	Bugatti	France	First special marque
1978	Mercedes-Benz	Germany	
1979	Bentley	Britain	60th anniversary.
1980	MG	Britain	
1981	Cunningham	United States	
1982	Porsche	Germany	
1983	Ford	United States	80th anniversary
1984	Ferrari	Italy	55th anniversary
1985	Alfa Romeo	Italy	First marque to be featured more than once. 75th anniversary.
1986	Mercedes-Benz	Germany	60th anniversary
1987	Chevrolet	United States	
1988	Maserati	Italy	
1989	Aston Martin	Britain	
1990	Allard	Britain	
1991	Juan Manuel Fangio	Argentina	First person to be featured
1992	Jaguar	Britain	70th anniversary
1993	Miller	United States	
1994	Ferrari	Italy	65th anniversary
1995	Lotus	Britain	
1996	BMW	Germany	80th anniversary
1997	Shelby	United States	35th anniversary
1998	Porsche	Germany	
1999	Auto Union	Germany	
2000	Maserati	Italy	
2001	Bentley	Britain	In light of Bentley's return to the 24 Hours of Le Mans.
2002	Corvette	United States	First model rather than a brand to be featured. 50th anniversary.
2003	Ford	United States	Centennial
2004	Ferrari	Italy	75th anniversary
2005	Chaparral	United States	First race team to be featured
2006	Cooper	Britain	
2007	Indianapolis 500 roadsters	United States	Promoting a then-recurring race group
2008	Alfa Romeo	Italy	
2009	Porsche	Germany	
2010	Dan Gurney	United States	
2011	Jaguar	Britain	
2012	Cobra	United States	In light of the Cobra's 50th anniversary
2013	Corvette	United States	In light of the Corvette's 60th anniversary and the new Corvette C7.
2014	Maserati	Italy	Centennial
2015	Shelby GT350	United States	50th anniversary
2016	BMW	Germany	Promoting BMW's centennial
2017	None		The circuit's 60th anniversary was tributed instead
2018	Nissan	Japan	Included cars from Datsun. 85th anniversary
2019	IMSA	United States	First time an organization is tributed. 50th anniversary.
2020	none		Event canceled
2021	Ford in Trans Am	United States	celebrating the 55th Anniversary of the Pony Car Wars.
2022	24 Hours of Le Mans	France	Event centennial. First time an event has been tributed.
2023	Corvette	United States	70th anniversary
2024	Salute to featured marques from years past		Event 50th
2025	Formula One		75th anniversary
2026	Icons of Japanese Motorsport	Japan	First time a nation and its racing culture has been tributed.

== Rules and format ==
Because of the high value of many of the cars used, the Reunion committee has established a severe punishment for avoidable contact. The driver convicted will be unable to participate in any further events, but can appeal the judgement one year after the incident.

In contrast to the Goodwood Revival, the races at the Monterey Reunion tend not to feature hard competition due to the high value of the cars.

In the prewar groups the drivers can be seen waving as a signal to other drivers to pass. This is to avoid any potentially-severe or costly damage to the vehicles.

Although the event features many groups of different types of racecars, it does not strictly place entrants in their most appropriate groups. For example, a 2.1 liter Morgan can be placed in an under two liter class despite being over the specified displacement. This is done due to the over two liter groups often featuring vehicles with at least five liters (a la SCCA). Certain postwar cars have been known to compete with the prewar cars due to technological similarities (e.g. the MG T-Series). Some drivers will enter themselves in the wrong class either as a late entry or if they were unable to qualify for their more appropriate class. The Trans Am Series race group, despite being predominantly five-liter cars, occasionally features an under two liter car.

Formerly, some races were held on Saturday and some on Sunday, with qualifying being held on Friday. For 2022 this was changed so that all groups were on Saturday.

== Modern race cars ==
In recent years there have been multiple instances in which contemporary racecars have been included in the race groups despite having been manufactured much later than even the most contemporary racecars regularly featured. In 2009, when featuring Porsche, an American Le Mans Series Porsche 911 was entered in the IMSA GT race group. That group was chosen due to the technological similarities between the IMSA GT cars and the modern ALMS cars. In 2012, an ALMS Corvette competed with the IMSA GTO race group. The event was featuring split IMSA groups that year: IMSA GT/GTX/AAGT/GTU and IMSA GTO. The latter was chosen due to the Corvette's more powerful engine. For 2016, the event featured contemporary BMW racecars such as those used in the ALMS in commemoration of that brand's centennial. In recent years a mixed race group of ALMS and GTP cars has been featured.

== Professional drivers ==
Although the Reunion is an amateur event and features predominantly non-professional competitors, some current and former professionals do attend. They are especially found in the IMSA groups.

Notable entrants include:

- The Edelbrock family.
- Randy Pobst
- Boris Said
- Bruce Canepa
- Brian Redman
- David Hobbs
- Leh Keen
- David Brabham
- Jim Hall
- Tommy Kendall
- Marshall Teague

== Sister events ==
Prior to 2010, the event was affiliated with the Wine Country Classic at Sonoma Raceway in Sonoma, California. The event is now known as the Sonoma Speed Festival. The event also featured Formula 5000 in 2008. Prior to 2010 the event was organized as a doubleheader, after which the event was redone to be more like the Monterey Event. The inaugural year of this new event had Saturday rained out, forcing all the race groups to be contested on Sunday. This became the format thereafter. The event also often features 1980s Trans Am Series cars racing alongside the IMSA GTO cars due to their technological similarities (IMSA GTO vehicles were often also used in Trans Am, similar to the Continental Tire Sports Car Challenge street tuner vehicles being able to compete in the Pirelli World Challenge touring car classes). This event also features classic NASCAR vehicles from both the Grand National and Winston Cup Series eras due to the event held there.

In May, 2017, a smaller event at WeatherTech Raceway debuted known as the Spring Classic.

== Change of management ==
After the 2009 event, General Racing Ltd. (GRL), who created and owned the event, and the Sports Car Racing Association of Monterey Peninsula (SCRAMP) announced that GRL would no longer sanction the event and that a new event would be organized by SCRAMP that would be more economically viable. After the 2010 event, the new event would be called the Rolex Monterey Motorsports Reunion. The original name was still owned and copyrighted by GRL, who would retain the sister event at Sonoma Raceway. SCRAMP recognizes the Historics and the Reunion as two separate events.

Despite the reorganization, change of management, and SCRAMP's observance of the "new event" as separate from the original Historics, the Reunion does not feature any notable differences from the original event aside from the new name. The Reunion uses exactly the same structure as the Historics and features the same regular race groups.

== Commendations ==
In 2013, the Reunion was nominated for the Motor Sports Event category at the International Historic Motoring Awards.

In 2017, the Rolex Monterey Motorsports Reunion won the FIA Founding Members' Heritage Cup for Motorsport Event of the Year, the first event at an American venue to receive the prestigious award.
