= Jacques Couture =

Jacques Couture may refer to:

- Jacques Couture (racing driver), Canadian auto racer
- Jacques Couture (politician), a member of the National Assembly of Quebec and cabinet minister
