= Bruce Canepa =

American racing driver

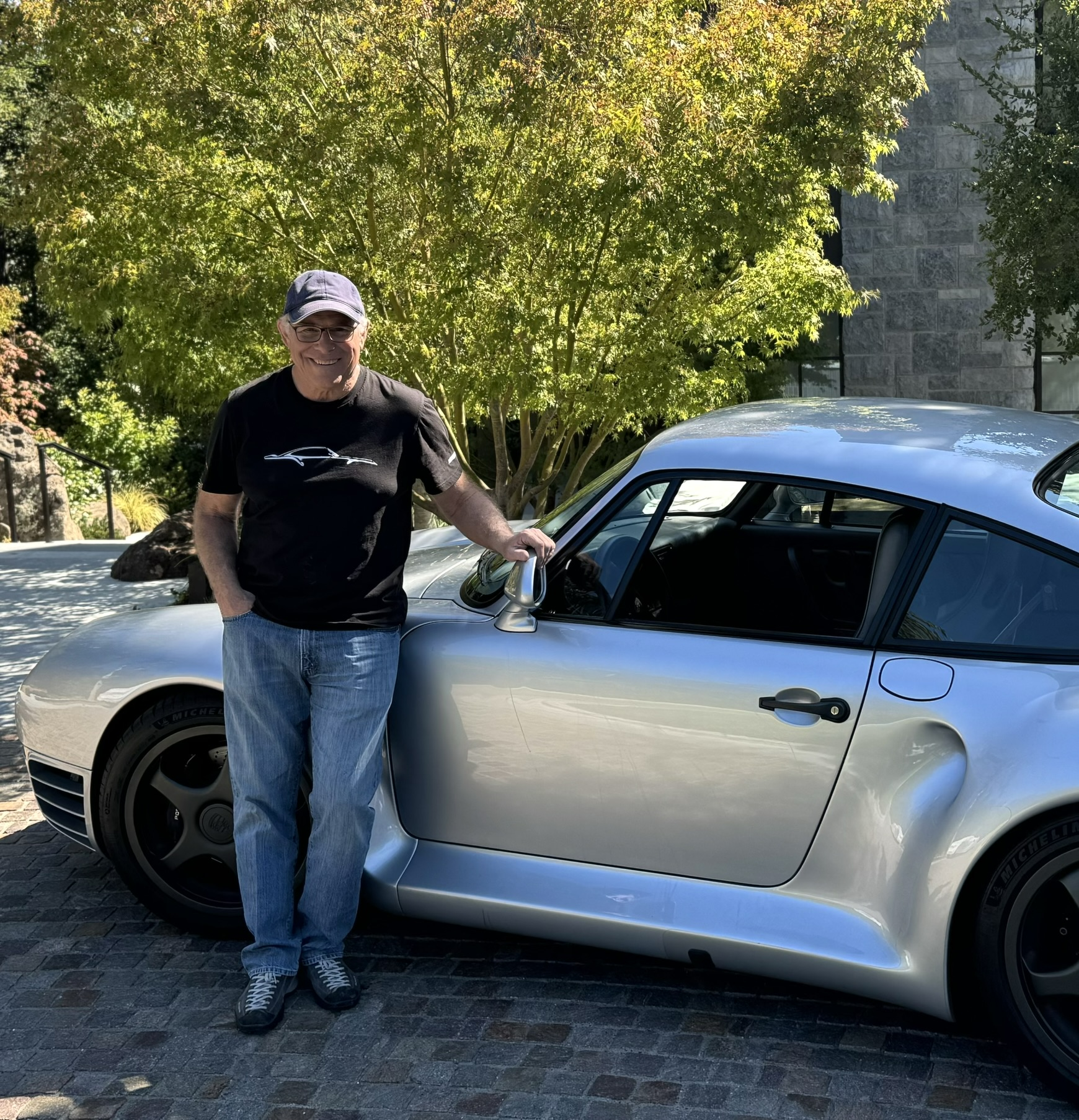
Bruce enjoying his 959

Bruce Canepa is a retired American race car driver and car dealer.

== Early life ==
Canepa was born and raised in Santa Cruz, California, where he developed an early interest in automobiles, motorcycles, and trucks. He purchased his first car, a 1929 Ford Model A, in 1963, and by age twelve had learned to drive a range of vehicles taught to him by his father. He spent much of his youth working in his family's car dealership, where he learned mechanical repair, fabrication, and body and paint work — skills he later applied to his restoration business.

== Racing career ==
As a youth, Canepa raced quarter midgets and go-karts before moving up to super modifieds and sprint cars, winning consecutive Rookie of the Year and Most Improved Driver honors across the Sportsman, Modified, and Sprint Car classes.

He has competed in IMSA GT, sprint car racing, super modifieds, and the Trans Am Series. He finished third in the 1979 24 Hours of Daytona with co-drivers Rick Mears and Monte Shelton, driving a Porsche 934 1/2. Porsche subsequently supplied him with a factory 935 for the remainder of the season. From 1980 to 1981, he co-drove a MOMO-liveried Porsche 935 with Gianpiero Moretti at Daytona, Mid-Ohio, and Riverside.

Canepa has also raced with Bobby Rahal in the first March GTP car — the first March GTP "ground-effects" prototype, co-driven with Rahal and Jim Trueman at the 1982 Daytona 24 Hours. He went on to drive an Electrodyne Lola T600 at the 1984 Riverside 6 Hours, and competed in his own Porsche 962 in West Coast IMSA events through the late 1980s.

He also competed multiple times in the Pikes Peak Hill Climb. On his 1981 debut there, driving a self-designed, twin-turbocharged Porsche-powered open-wheeler, he qualified first and finished second overall. He later competed in the tandem-axle big-rig division, setting the class course record in 2000 and 2001, then lowering it again in 2002 to a time of 13 minutes, 57.800 seconds — a mark that still stands.

He is currently a regular at the Monterey Historic Automobile Races, where he campaigns his Porsche 935, and is a member of the Road Racing Drivers Club.

=== Selected results ===
- 3rd overall, 1979 24 Hours of Daytona (Porsche 934½, with Rick Mears and Monte Shelton)
- 2nd overall, 1981 Pikes Peak International Hill Climb (debut appearance)
- Tandem-axle big-rig course record, Pikes Peak International Hill Climb, 2000–2002 (13:57.800)
- 1st and 3rd, Pebble Beach Concours d'Elegance Porsche race-car class (917/10 Can-Am car and 962 Rothmans car, respectively)

== Business career ==
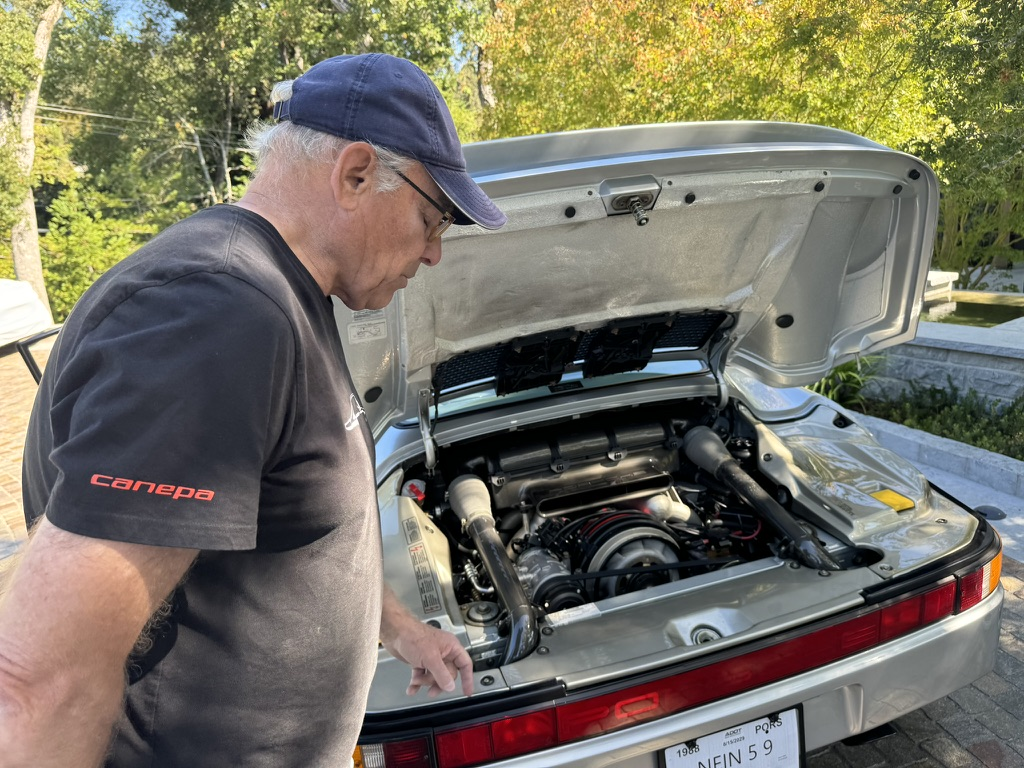
Bruce enjoying his 959 engine bay

Canepa scaled back full-time racing in the early 1980s to build his own automotive businesses. In 1982, he opened Bruce Canepa Motorcars, a dealership representing Lamborghini, Maserati, Porsche, Audi, and BMW, alongside Canepa Design, a restoration and customization shop. The following year he began designing aerodynamic Kenworth trucks, and in 1985 acquired Concept Transporters, a custom truck and motorcoach manufacturer; by 1993 that business had become his primary focus, eventually producing more than 1,500 custom trucks and motorhomes.

His company, now known as Canepa, is based in a 65,000-square-foot headquarters, showroom, and museum in Scotts Valley, California, which opened in 2006 and houses a rotating collection of roughly 30 significant vehicles. Canepa's work spans collector-vehicle sales, concours-level restoration, and bespoke design and customization, with a portfolio ranging from early hot rods to vintage Can-Am and IMSA prototypes.

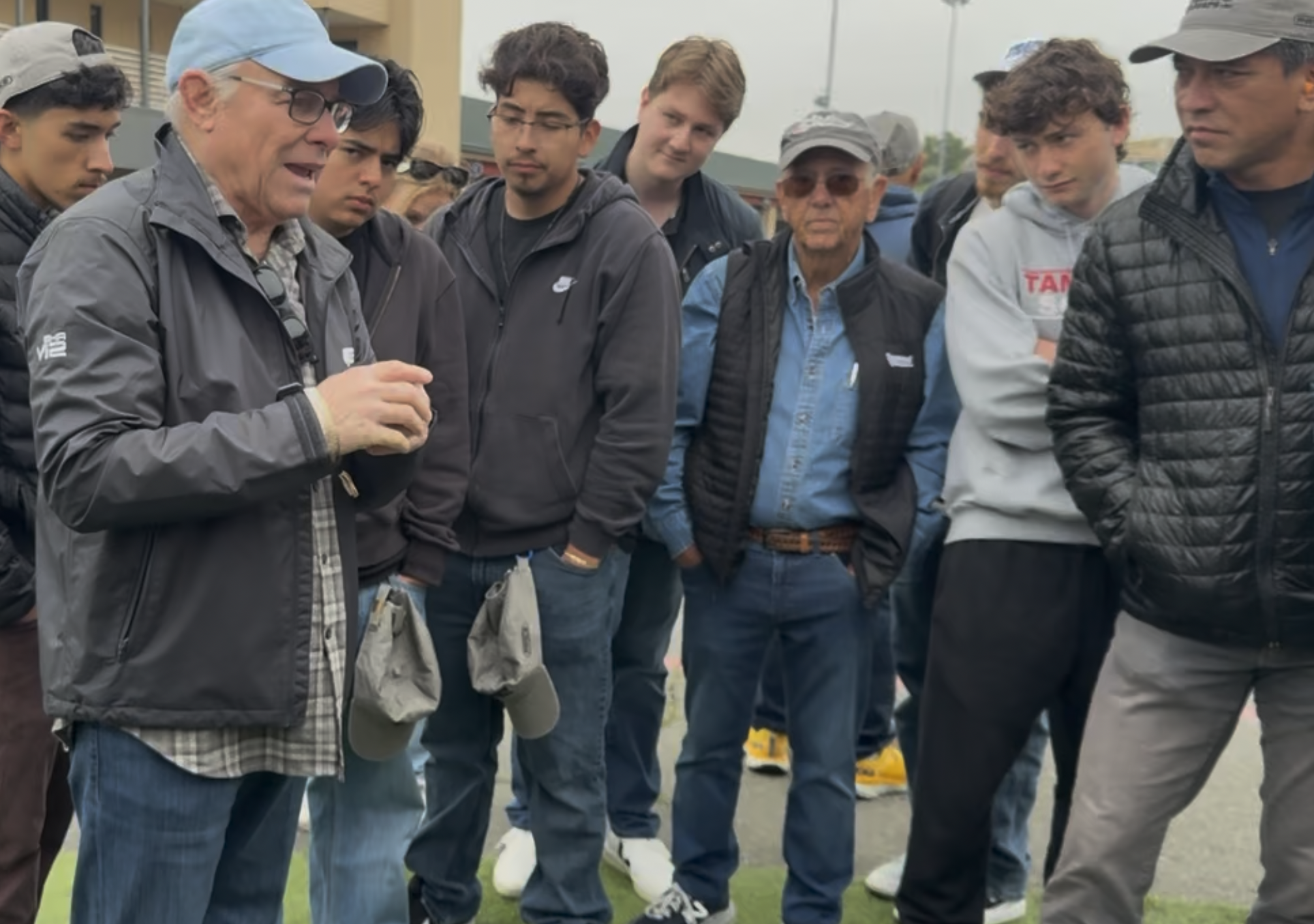
Bruce enjoying sharing his insights

]

== Porsche 959 and the "Show or Display" law ==
Canepa is regarded as a leading American authority on the Porsche 959, a technologically advanced 1980s supercar that was never federally certified for use on U.S. roads. He purchased his first 959 in 1988 and began developing a U.S.-compliant version of the car. That effort contributed to passage of the federal "Show or Display" law in 1998, which permits a limited number of historically or technologically significant vehicles that do not meet U.S. safety and emissions standards to be legally imported and driven on a restricted basis; Canepa has said he lobbied for the law alongside Bill Gates, another 959 owner. Canepa delivered his first federalized 959 in 2000 and the first fully California-compliant example in 2003. His company's continuing "Porsche 959 Reimagined" program re-engineers the car with modern components and more than 800 horsepower, with finished cars valued at more than $2 million.

== Timeline ==
Year	Event
1963	Purchases his first car, a 1929 Ford Model A.
1966	Begins racing NASCAR Sportsman class; first race at Watsonville Speedway, California.
1970	Moves up to Super Modified racing.
1976	Begins competing in Sprint Cars.
1978	Enters sports car racing in IMSA and Trans-Am; first sports car race at Sears Point Raceway in a Porsche 934.5.
1979	Finishes 3rd overall at the 24 Hours of Daytona as an independent team; obtains and races the last factory-built Porsche 935.
1980–1981	Co-drives the MOMO-liveried Porsche 935 with Gianpiero Moretti.
1981	Finishes 2nd overall at the Pikes Peak Hill Climb on his debut appearance.
1982	Opens Bruce Canepa Motorcars and Canepa Design.
1983	Begins designing aerodynamic Kenworth trucks.
1985	Acquires Concept Transporters.
1988	Purchases his first Porsche 959 and begins developing a U.S.-legal version.
1993	Canepa becomes his primary business.
1998	The federal "Show or Display" law for exotic automobiles passes.
2000	Delivers the first Canepa-federalized Porsche 959; sets the tandem-axle big-rig course record at Pikes Peak.
2000–2002	Sets and re-sets the tandem-axle big-rig record at Pikes Peak, finishing in 13:57.800 in 2002.
2003	Builds the first California-compliant Canepa 959.
2006	Opens the Scotts Valley, California headquarters and museum.
