= McKee Mk.14 =

American sports prototype racing cars

- Category: Group 7 (Can-Am)
- Constructor: McKee Racing
- Designer: Bob McKee

Technical specifications
- Chassis: Stainless steel space frame chassis covered in fiberglass body
- Wheelbase: 97 in (246.4 cm)
- Engine: Oldsmobile 455 cu in (7.5 L) V8 engine twin-turbo mid-engined, four-wheel-drive
- Transmission: Turbo-Hydramatic 2-speed automatic
- Power: > 700 hp (520 kW)
- Weight: 1,848 lb (838.2 kg)

Competition history
- Debut: 1969 Can-Am Road America
Races
1 (DNS)

The McKee Mk.14, is a special purpose-built American sports prototype race car, designed, developed and built by Bob McKee, and built to Group 7 specifications, for the Can-Am series, in 1969. It was experimental, but ultimately unsuccessful, failing to start the only race it entered; the 1969 Road America Can-Am round.
