= Hovercraft Club of Great Britain =

Governing body of hovercraft in Great Britain

The Hovercraft Club of Great Britain is the voluntary-run national sports governing body for racing light hovercraft in England, Scotland and Wales.

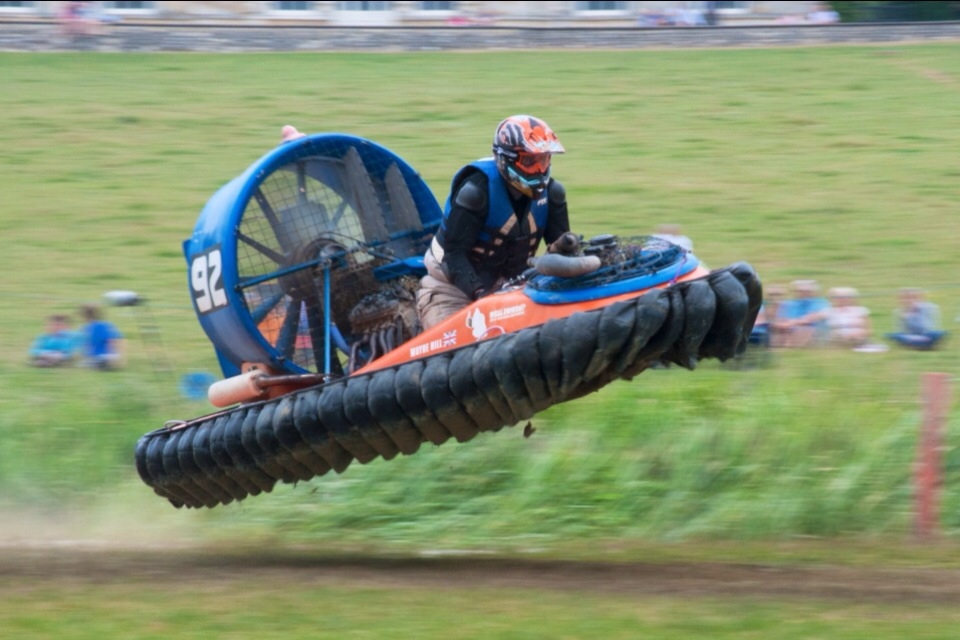
HCGB hovercraft race in April 2014

== History ==
It was founded in 1966. The hovercraft was developed by Hovercraft Development in the early 1960s. In the 1970s it was affiliated to the Water Recreation Division of the Central Council of Physical Recreation (now the Sport and Recreation Alliance). The Hovercraft club of Great Britain ran national school competitions one such competition took place at Ramsgate circa 1974.

== Structure ==
The HCGB is affiliated to the World Hovercraft Federation and European Hovercraft Federation. It is recognised as the sports governing body for hovercraft in England by Sport England, and by Sportscotland, Sport Wales and by UK Sport. It is not recognised by Sport Northern Ireland.
