= Avoidable contact =

Rule in motorsport

In the sport of automobile racing, most series have strict penalties for "avoidable contact". In such an incident, two or more vehicles collide in a way so as to make notable damage. The race officials then review the incident, and provide a verdict on whether the contact was avoidable. If the judgement is that it was avoidable, the instigator of the collision will be penalized. Usually, this consists of driving all the way through pit lane into his pit box and then being forced to idle for up to a minute, depending on the severity of the damage.

== Penalties ==
In the IndyCar Series' rulebook, avoidable contact is listed under Rule 9.3.3: "The primary responsibility for avoiding contact with a Competitor resides with the overtaking Competitor and the secondary responsibility resides with the Competitor(s) being overtaken. A Competitor who fails to demonstrate their responsibility and initiates a maneuver that results in contact with another Competitor may be penalized." IndyCar often docks points from the drivers' championship for offenders; for example, in 2015, Hélio Castroneves lost eight points for avoidable contact with Scott Dixon at the Grand Prix of Indianapolis, and earlier in the year, Ryan Hunter-Reay lost five points and was also placed on probation for forcing Simon Pagenaud off the track and into Hunter-Reay and Sébastien Bourdais at the Indy Grand Prix of Louisiana.

In Formula One, drivers would receive grid penalties; for example, after the 2010 Korean Grand Prix, Adrian Sutil was awarded a five-place grid penalty for the next race, the Brazilian Grand Prix, after colliding with Kamui Kobayashi during the race.
