= Jacques Couture (racing driver) =

Canadian auto racer

Jacques Couture is a Canadian auto racer. He is known for opening North America's first racing school called Jim Russell Racing in Quebec which later expanded to California in multiple locations. Most all recent driving schools have been based on Couture’s technique and original model for Jim Russell Racing in Canada and North America. He was inducted into the Canadian Motorsport Hall of Fame in 2000. He has been credited as the "instructor who taught the young Gilles Villeneuve how to race." Couture also created a mechanics training programme for aspiring race car mechanics in 1971. Couture won the 1971 Players (Canadian) Formula B Championship Series.
