= Monte Shelton =

American racing driver (1933–2019)

Monte Shelton (1933 – June 16, 2019) was an American racing driver from Portland, Oregon.

== Early life ==
He was born in Missouri before his family moved to Vanport, Oregon, in 1943, where his father worked in a shipyard. He later joined the United States Coast Guard, serving on the USCGC Bluebell before going to Portland State College to work towards a degree in elementary education before he eventually became interested in automobiles.

== Racing career ==
Shelton began racing in the early 1960s, with his career gaining traction a few years later when he began competing in the United States Road Racing Championship. Shelton also became regular competitor in Can-Am from 1966 to 1974, scoring points only in the 1974 season driving a McLaren M8F. Shelton also started several Trans-Am races between 1976 and 1987, where he took five race victories driving a variety of different Porsches. In sports car racing, he participated in the 24 Hours of Daytona, with a best finish of third in the 1979, edition of the race with co-drivers Bruce Canepa and Rick Mears. He also participated many other IMSA Camel GT races, including the 12 Hours of Sebring. Included in his sports car career were two class victories in the Six Hours of the Glen at Watkins Glen International. Outside of sportscars, Shelton had a brief single-seater career driving in Formula 5000 cars, racing a Gurney Eagle during the 1971 SCCA L&M Continental 5000 Championship. In amateur racing, Shelton participated regularly in Portland's Rose Cup races, winning seven times over five decades. He also served as a co-founder of SCCA's Oregon Region and held a competition license with the organization for over 60 years. On October 14, 2004, he was inducted into the Oregon Sports Hall of Fame. In 2017, he was inducted into the Northwest Motorsports Hall of Fame.

== Personal life ==
Outside of racing, Shelton owned a collector car dealership called "Monte's Motors", where he specialized in British automobiles. Shelton died June 16, 2019, from complications from pancreatic cancer.

== Racing results ==
=== 24 Hours of Daytona ===
Year	Team	Co-Drivers	Car	Class	Laps	Pos.	Class Pos.
1979	(United States) Bruce Canepa	(United States) Bruce Canepa (United States) Rick Mears	Porsche 935	GTX	627	3rd	2nd
1988	(United States) Escort Porsche	(United States) Karl Durkheimer (United States) Jim Torres (United States) Nort Northam	Porsche 911 Carrera	GTU	455	33rd	6th
1989	(United States) SP Racing	(United States) Gary Auberlen (United States) Bill Auberlen (United States) Cary Eisenlohr	Porsche 911 Carrera	GTU	351	DNF	DNF
1995	(United States) Alex Job Racing	(United States) Joe Cogbill (United States) Jack Lewis (United States) Charles Slater	Porsche 911	GTS-2	633	13th	6th
1996	(United States) Alex Job Racing	(United States) Joe Cogbill (United States) John Rutherford (United States) Ron Finger	Porsche 911	GTS-2	599	14th	7th
1997	(Costa Rica) Jorge Trejos	(Costa Rica) Jorge Trejos (United States) Jeff Gamroth (United States) Tim Ralston	Porsche 993	GTS-3	632	13th	4th

=== 12 Hours of Sebring ===
Year	Team	Co-Drivers	Car	Class	Laps	Pos.	Class Pos.
1997	(Costa Rica) Jorge Trejos	(United States) Jeff Gamroth (United States) Tim Ralston	Porsche 993	GTS-3	247	19th	6th
