= McKee Mk.6 =

The McKee Mk.6 is a special purpose-built American sports prototype race car, designed, developed, and built by Bob McKee, in 1966. It competed in both the United States Road Racing Championship, and the Can-Am series. It achieved a total of 2 wins and 5 podium finishes. Career highlights for it include wins at both Road America and Riverside in 1966, a fourth-place finish at Las Vegas in 1966, and another podium finish at Watkins Glen that same year. It was powered by numerous engines, including Chevrolet, Ford, and Oldsmobile motors.
