= McLaren M1A =

Sports car

McLaren M1A McLaren M1B McLaren M1C
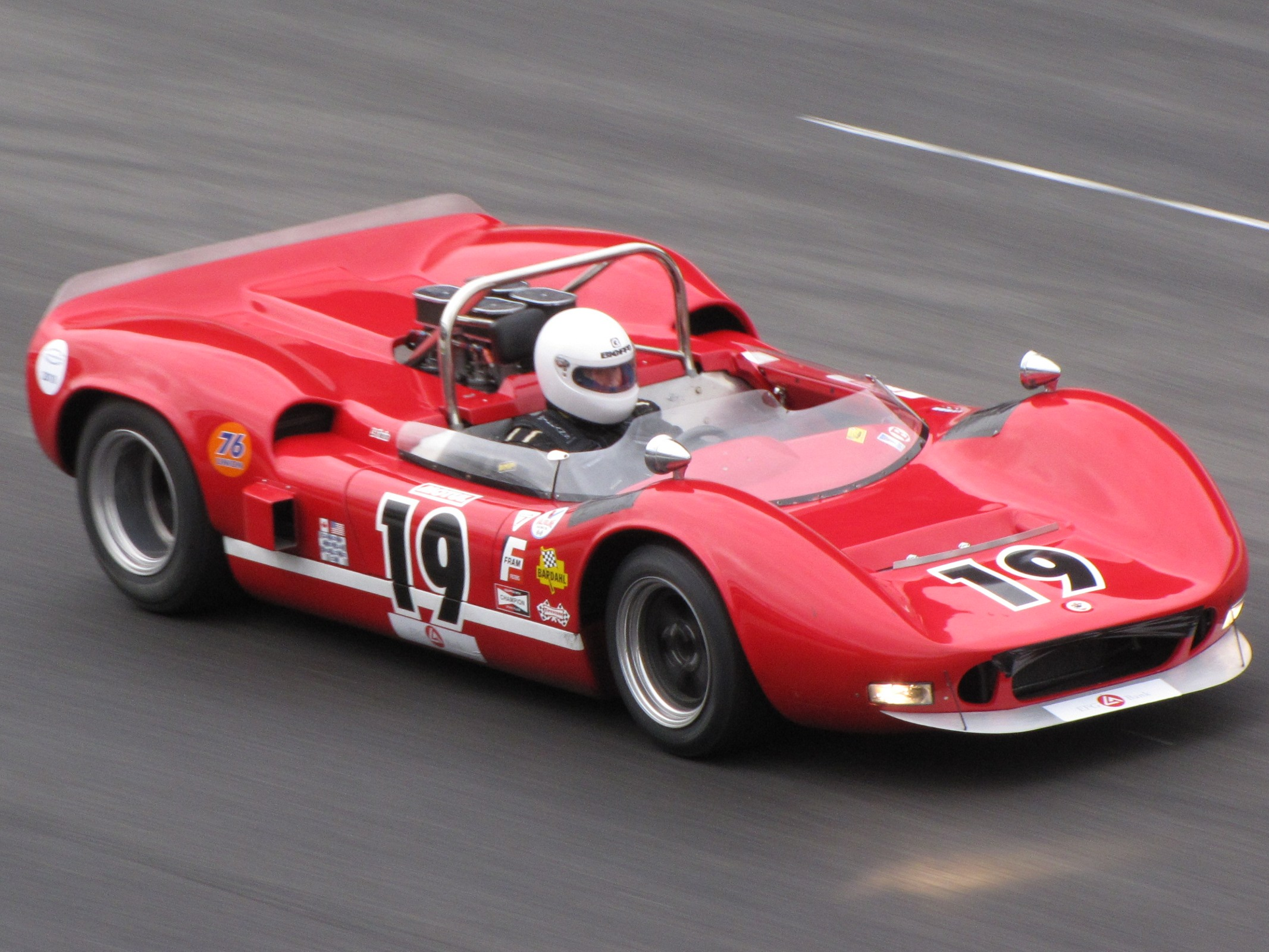
- Category: Group 7
- Constructor: McLaren
- Designer: Tony Hilder
- Production: 1963-1968

Technical specifications
- Chassis: Steel-reinforced tubular space frame covered in fiberglass panels
- Length: 145–164 in (3,700–4,200 mm)
- Width: 59–64 in (1,500–1,600 mm)
- Height: 30–35 in (760–890 mm)
- Axle track: Front: 51–52 in (1,300–1,300 mm); Rear: 51–52 in (1,300–1,300 mm)
- Wheelbase: 89–91 in (2,300–2,300 mm)
- Engine: Mid-engine, longitudinally mounted, 3.5–6.2 L (214–378 cu in), Oldsmobile; Chevrolet small-block Chevrolet big-block Ford FE, 90° V8, NA
- Transmission: Hewland L.G. 500 4-speed or L.G. 600 5-speed manual
- Power: 310–550 hp (230–410 kW)
- Weight: 1,215–1,850 lb (551–839 kg)

Competition history

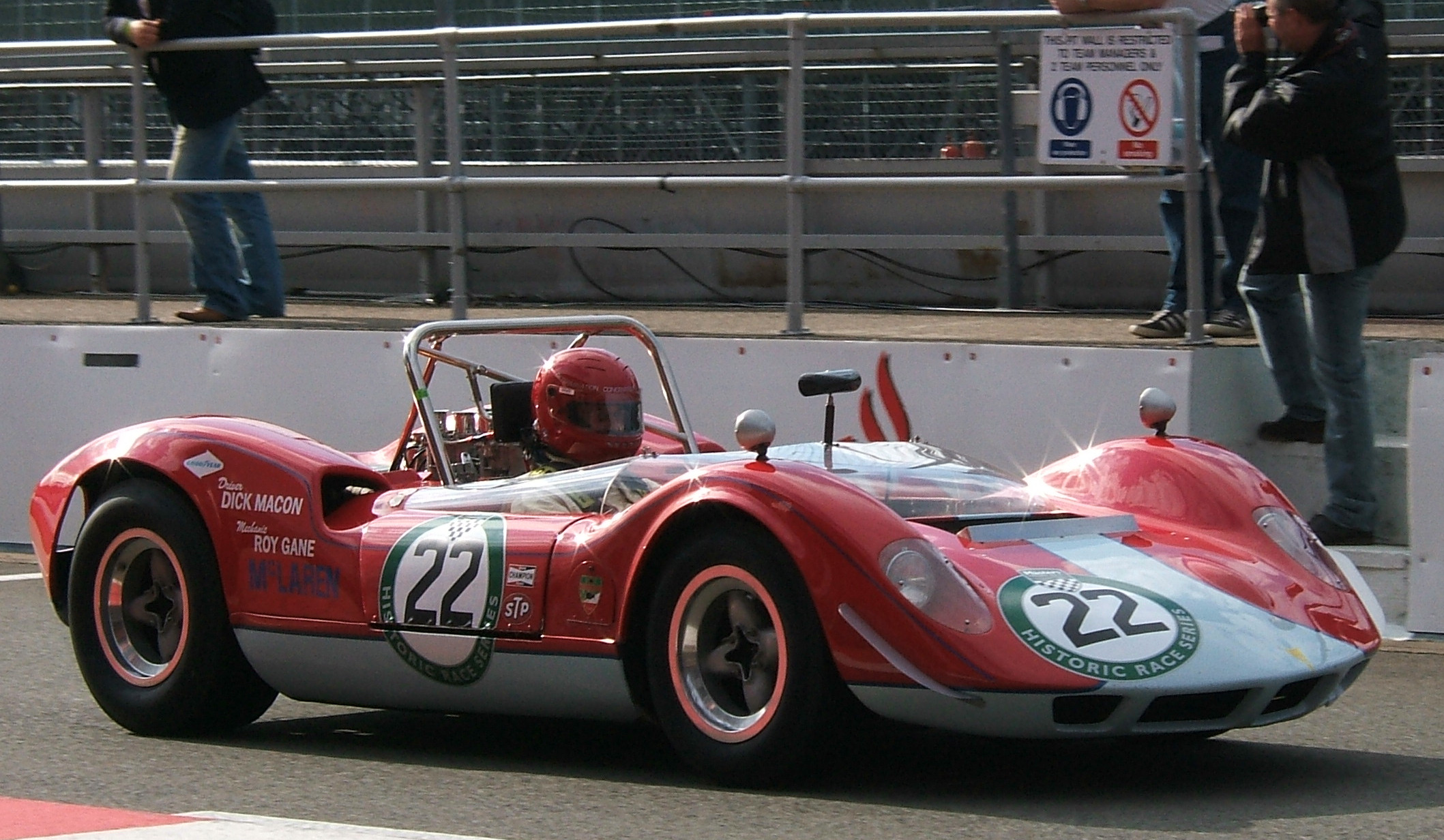
McLaren M1A

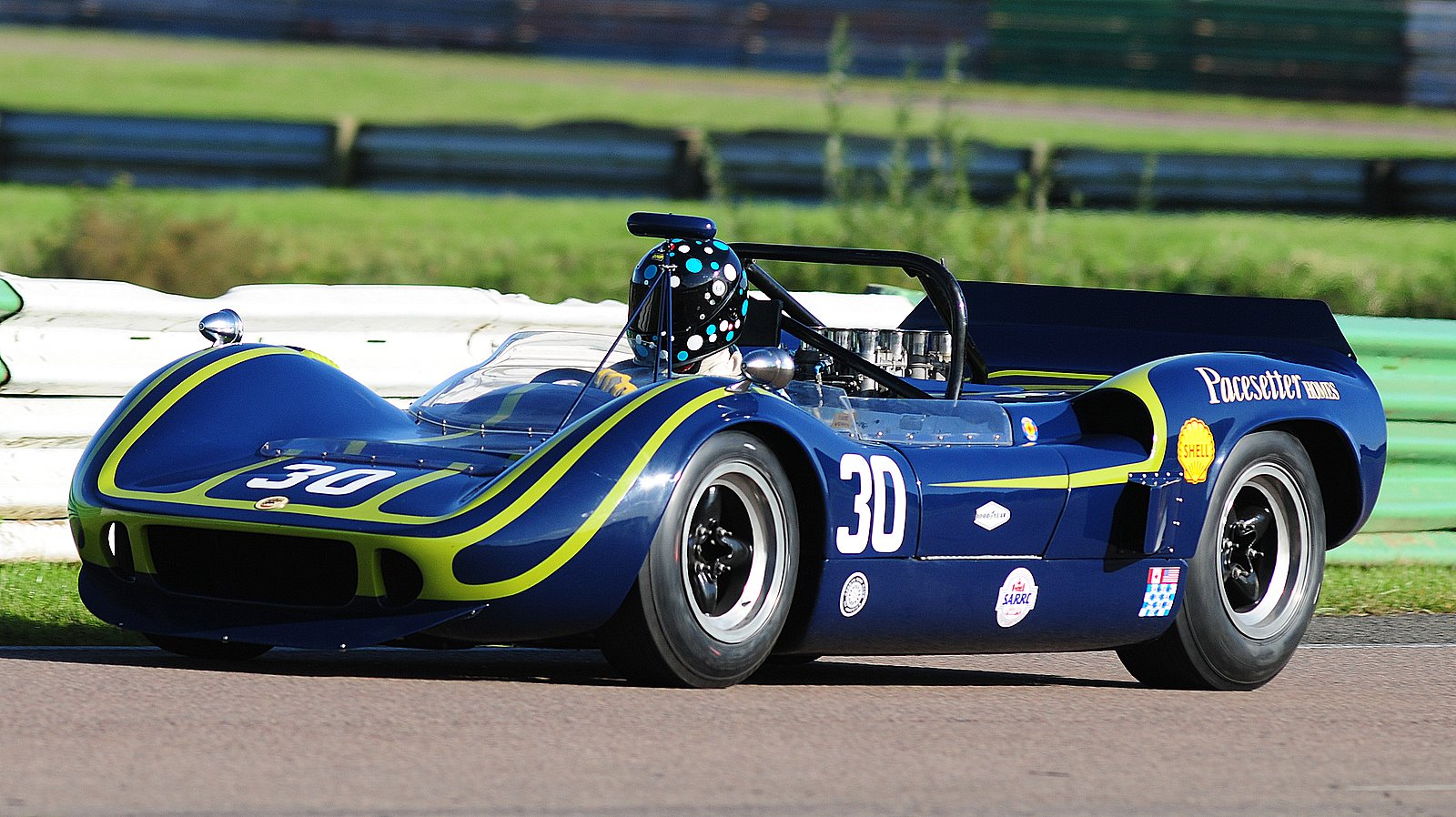
McLaren M1B

The McLaren M1A, and its derivatives, the McLaren M1B and the McLaren M1C, are a series of mid-engined Group 7 sports prototype race cars built by McLaren, between 1963 and 1968.

The M1A was the team's first self-designed and developed sports car. Later versions, such as the 'M1B' and 'M1C', competed and raced in the North American Can-Am series, starting in 1966 season. The car was raced in North America and Europe in 1963 and 1964 in various Group 7 and United States Road Racing Championship series events. 24 examples of the M1A and M1B were built, and 25 examples of the M1C were manufactured.

The car was powered by a few different motors, including Chevrolet small-block engine, an all-aluminum Oldsmobile V8 engine, a Chevrolet big-block engine, and even a Ford FE engine. It was constructed out of a tubular space frame chassis, and, combined with its light weight of 551 kg (1,215 lb) gave it a great power-to-weight ratio. The 4.5 L (270 cu in) Oldsmobile V8 engine developed around 310 hp (230 kW), while the 350 cu in (5.7 L) Chevrolet small-block V8 engine was capable of developing over 550 hp (410 kW), and 538 lb⋅ft (729 N⋅m) of torque. This drove the rear wheels through a Hewland L.G.500 four-speed manual transmission.
