= 1965 SCCA National Championship Runoffs =

1965 SCCA amateur racing event

The 1965 American Road Race of Champions was the second running of the SCCA National Championship Runoffs. It took place on 27 and 28 November 1965 at Daytona International Speedway, on 3,1-mile and 1,6-mile courses. Despite the National Championship being cancelled, the ARRC still was not a championship race, as National Championships were awarded to Divisional winners. Most competitive drivers from SCCA's seven divisions were invited to the event.

== Changes for 1965 ==
1965 saw several changes in SCCA's class structure.

Formula Libre was split up in Formula A for under-3-litre racing engines and Formula B for 1,6-litre production engines. Formula Junior was now replaced by Formula C for 1,1-litre racing engines.

New cars were homologated for Production classes, including the new Porsche 911. Some other cars were reclassified, for example the Austin-Healey 100-6.

== Race results ==
Class winners for multi-class races in bold.

=== Race 1 - H Production ===
The first race, held on November 27, was the H Production race. It was held on the 1,6-mile course for 45 minutes and 32 laps.

| Pos | Class | Qualified in class | Driver | No. | Car | Entrant | Division | Laps | Info |
|---|---|---|---|---|---|---|---|---|---|
| 1 | HP | 4th | (United States) Peter Feistmann | 21 | Fiat-Abarth 850 Allemano Spider | - | Southeast | 32 | |
| 2 | HP | 5th | (United States) Randy Canfield | 13 | Austin-Healey Sprite | - | Northeast | 32 | |
| 3 | HP | 13th | (United States) Robert Rentzell | 22 | Austin-Healey Sprite | - | Southeast | 32 | |
| 4 | HP | 7th | (United States) Bobby Vandivort | 41 | Austin-Healey Sprite | - | Midwest | 32 | |
| 5 | HP | 6th | (United States) Bob Turgeon | 12 | Austin-Healey Sprite | - | Northeast | 32 | |
| 6 | HP | 12th | (United States) Kent Carpenter | 31 | Austin-Healey Sprite | - | Central | 32 | |
| 7 | HP | 8th | (United States) Bill Cox | 52 | Austin-Healey Sprite | - | Southwest | 31 | |
| 8 | HP | 6th | (United States) Lloyd Barton | 34 | Austin-Healey Sprite | - | Central | 31 | |
| 9 | HP | 9th | (United States) Dean Hatch | 62 | Austin-Healey Sprite | - | Pacific | 30 | |
| 10 | HP | 10th | (United States) George Cowherd | 42 | Austin-Healey Sprite | - | Midwest | 30 | |
| 11 | HP | 2nd | (United States) Lee Mueller | 61 | Austin-Healey Sprite | - | Pacific | 30 | Blown tire. |
| 12 | HP | 16th | (United States) Dick Brownfield | 54 | Austin-Healey Sprite | - | Southwest | 30 | |
| DNF | HP | 11th | (United States) Dan Miller | 51 | Austin-Healey Sprite | - | Southwest | 16 | DNF |
| DNF | HP | 1st | (United States) Carl Truitt | 11 | Austin-Healey Sprite | - | Northeast | 10 | DNF |
| DNF | HP | 16th | (United States) Joe Garrison | 24 | Austin-Healey Sprite | - | Southeast | 9 | DNF |

=== Race 2 - H Modified ===
The H Modified race was held on November 27 on the 1,6-mile course for 45 minutes and 35 laps.

| Pos | Class | Qualified in class | Driver | No. | Car | Entrant | Division | Laps | Info |
|---|---|---|---|---|---|---|---|---|---|
| 1 | HM | 1st | (United States) Jerry Mong | 32 | Bobsy SR3-SAAB | - | Central | 35 | Led laps 1-35. |
| 2 | HM | 2nd | (United States) John Igleheart | 11 | Bobsy SR2-OSCA | - | Northeast | 35 | |
| 3 | HM | 5th | (United States) Jim Lawrence | 62 | Lindqvist Special-SAAB | - | Pacific | 34 | |
| 4 | HM | 3rd | (United States) Bill Mitchell | 31 | Sunbeam Special | - | Central | 34 | |
| 5 | HM | 6th | (United States) Dick Jacobs | 34 | Jackal-SAAB | - | Central | 34 | |
| 6 | HM | 4th | (United States) Fred Cox | 21 | Sunbeam Special | - | Southeast | 34 | |
| 7 | HM | 12th | (United States) Glen Shepard | 42 | Jabro-SAAB | - | Midwest | 32 | |
| 8 | HM | 9th | (United States) Fred Minning | 23 | Sunbeam Special | - | Southeast | 31 | |
| 9 | HM | 13th | (United States) Gordon Waddle | 43 | Li'l Duck 1-SAAB | - | Midwest | 29 | |
| 10 | HM | 8th | (United States) George Avent | 22 | Begra Mk III-Abarth | - | Southeast | 26 | |
| 11 | HM | 10th | (United States) John Gordon | 14 | OSCA S750 Special | - | Northeast | 19 | |
| DNF | HM | 11th | (United States) Floyd Lambert | 51 | Lambert-Abarth | - | Southwest | 26 | DNF |
| DNF | HM | 7th | (United States) Dan Parkinson | 61 | Dolphin America-Abarth | - | Pacific | 9 | DNF |
| DNF | HM | 14th | (United States) David Bland | 52 | Jabland-SAAB | - | Southwest | 4 | DNF |
| DNF | HM | 15th | (United States) George Garrett | 13 | Bobsy SR2-Ford | - | Northeast | 0 | DNF |

=== Race 3 - G Production ===
The G Production race was held on November 27 on the 1,6-mile course for 45 minutes and 33 laps.

| Pos | Class | Qualified in class | Driver | No. | Car | Entrant | Division | Laps | Info |
|---|---|---|---|---|---|---|---|---|---|
| 1 | GP | 1st | (United States) Emmett Brown | 62 | MG Midget | - | Pacific | 33 | Led laps 1-33. |
| 2 | GP | 2nd | (United States) Rick Hilgers | 61 | Austin-Healey Sprite | - | Pacific | 33 | |
| 3 | GP | 4th | (United States) Bob Sharp | 11 | Datsun Sports SPL310 | - | Northeast | 33 | |
| 4 | GP | 5th | (United States) Dick Gilmartin | 12 | Triumph Spitfire | - | Northeast | 33 | |
| 5 | GP | 3rd | (United States) Fred Darling | 13 | Austin-Healey Sprite | - | Northeast | 33 | |
| 6 | GP | 7th | (United States) Steve Froines | 63 | Triumph Spitfire | - | Pacific | 33 | |
| 7 | GP | 11th | (United States) Walter McCray | 42 | Austin-Healey Sprite | - | Midwest | 32 | |
| 8 | GP | 9th | (United States) Don Smith | 51 | Triumph Spitfire | - | Southwest | 32 | |
| 9 | GP | 13th | (United States) Roger Chastain | 23 | Triumph Spitfire | - | Southeast | 32 | |
| 10 | GP | 10th | (United States) John Tremblay | 22 | Datsun Sports SPL310 | - | Southeast | 32 | |
| 11 | GP | 15th | (United States) Tommy Allen | 43 | Datsun Sports SPL310 | - | Midwest | 31 | |
| 12 | GP | 14th | (United States) Dick Drexler | 31 | Austin-Healey Sprite | - | Central | 31 | |
| DNF | GP | 12th | (United States) Don Davenport | 52 | Triumph Spitfire | - | Southwest | 28 | DNF |
| DNF | GP | 17th | (United States) D.W. Foerster | 53 | Datsun Sports SPL310 | - | Southwest | 15 | DNF |
| DNF | GP | 16th | (United States) Walt Biddle | 33 | MG Midget | - | Central | 9 | DNF |
| DNF | GP | 6th | (United States) Bob Clemens | 32 | Triumph Spitfire | - | Central | 4 | DNF |
| DNF | GP | 8th | (United States) David Kiser | 41 | Triumph Spitfire | - | Midwest | 3 | DNF |
| DNF | GP | 18th | (United States) Don Kearney | 21 | Triumph Spitfire | - | Southeast | 1 | DNF |

=== Race 4 - G Modified ===
The G Modified race was held on November 27 on the 1,6-mile course for 45 minutes and 36 laps.

| Pos | Class | Qualified in class | Driver | No. | Car | Entrant | Division | Laps | Info |
|---|---|---|---|---|---|---|---|---|---|
| 1 | GM | 9th | (United States) Jim Baker | 21 | Lotus 23 | - | Southeast | 36 | |
| 2 | GM | 2nd | (United States) Gordon Heald | 11 | Elva Mk VII-Coventry Climax | - | Northeast | 36 | |
| 3 | GM | 5th | (United States) Harry Banta | 62 | Ferharry (Genie Mk.5-Coventry Climax) | - | Pacific | 36 | |
| 4 | GM | 3rd | (United States) Quinn Calhoun | 31 | Elva Mk VII | - | Central | 36 | |
| 5 | GM | 4th | (United States) W.D. Roland | 52 | Merlyn MK 6 | - | Southwest | 35 | |
| 6 | GM | 10th | (United States) Edwin Arnold | 13 | Lotus 23 | - | Northeast | 35 | |
| 7 | GM | 8th | (United States) Peter Dawson | 33 | Lola Mk1 | - | Central | 34 | |
| DNF | GM | 6th | (United States) Wick Williams | 22 | Lotus 23B-Ford | - | Southeast | 26 | DNF |
| DNF | GM | 11th | (United States) Peter Talbert | 63 | Bourgeault | - | Pacific | 24 | DNF |
| DNF | GM | 7th | (United States) Robert Kelce | 42 | Elva Mk VII | - | Midwest | 14 | DNF |
| DNF | GM | 1st | (United States) Charles Barns | 51 | Merlyn MK 6A-Ford | - | Southwest | 7 | DNF |

=== Race 5 - F Production ===
The F Production race was held on November 27 on the 1,6-mile course for 45 minutes and 34 laps.

| Pos | Class | Qualified in class | Driver | No. | Car | Entrant | Division | Laps | Info |
|---|---|---|---|---|---|---|---|---|---|
| 1 | FP | 2nd | (United States) Brian Fuerstenau | 11 | Triumph TR3 | Group 44 | Northeast | 34 | Led laps 3-34. |
| 2 | FP | 1st | (United States) Lee Midgley | 62 | Triumph TR2 | - | Pacific | 34 | |
| 3 | FP | 4th | (United States) Richard Hull | 31 | Volvo P1800 | - | Central | 34 | |
| 4 | FP | 6th | (United States) Leo Picard | 12 | Volvo P1800 | - | Northeast | 34 | |
| 5 | FP | 7th | (United States) L.C. Thomas | 63 | Sunbeam Alpine | - | Pacific | 34 | |
| 6 | FP | 8th | (United States) Eddie Wachs | 33 | Alfa Romeo Giulietta | - | Central | 34 | |
| 7 | FP | 11th | (United States) John Gunn | 21 | Alfa Romeo Giulietta | - | Southeast | 33 | |
| 8 | FP | 12th | (United States) Bill Riggs | 41 | Triumph TR3 | - | Midwest | 33 | |
| 9 | FP | 5th | (United States) Dan Carmichael | 32 | Sunbeam Alpine | - | Central | 33 | |
| 10 | FP | 10th | (United States) John Barker | 42 | MG MGA | - | Midwest | 33 | |
| 11 | FP | 14th | (United States) Bill Bagby | 51 | Triumph TR3 | - | Southwest | 33 | |
| 12 | FP | 15th | (United States) Bill Buchman | 22 | Sunbeam Alpine | - | Southeast | 32 | |
| 13 | FP | 17th | (United States) Bob Mitchell | 23 | Triumph TR3 | - | Southeast | 31 | |
| 14 | FP | 16th | (United States) Jack Jewell | 52 | Triumph TR3 | - | Southwest | 30 | |
| 15 | FP | 18th | (United States) Elouise Norris | 43 | Triumph TR3 | - | Midwest | 30 | |
| DNF | FP | 13th | (United States) Buell Owen | 53 | Triumph TR3 | - | Southwest | 23 | DNF |
| DNF | FP | 3rd | (United States) Jim Dittemore | 61 | Triumph TR3 | - | Pacific | 23 | DNF |
| DNF | FP | 9th | (United States) Al Costner | 13 | Sunbeam Alpine | - | Northeast | 4 | DNF |

=== Race 6 - E Production ===
The E Production race was held on November 27 on the 1,6-mile course for 45 minutes and 34 laps.

| Pos | Class | Qualified in class | Driver | No. | Car | Entrant | Division | Laps | Info |
|---|---|---|---|---|---|---|---|---|---|
| 1 | EP | 4th | (United States) Allan Barker | 31 | Austin-Healey 100-6 | - | Central | 34 | |
| 2 | EP | 5th | (United States) Carl Swanson | 62 | Morgan +4 | - | Pacific | 34 | |
| 3 | EP | 8th | (United States) Ray Pickering | 41 | Lotus Seven America | - | Midwest | 34 | |
| 4 | EP | 10th | (United States) Richard K. Roberts | 42 | Porsche 356 | - | Midwest | 34 | |
| 5 | EP | 11th | (United States) Bill Phaneuf | 22 | Lotus Seven America | - | Southeast | 33 | |
| 6 | EP | 9th | (United States) Nagle Bridwell | 13 | Porsche 356B Super 90 | - | Northeast | 33 | |
| 7 | EP | 15th | (United States) Fred Keyser | 21 | Porsche 356 Speedster | - | Southeast | 32 | |
| 8 | EP | 20th | (United States) Vincent Collins | 55 | Porsche 356 Speedster | - | Southwest | 32 | |
| 9 | EP | 3rd | (United States) Dick Brakenridge | 33 | Porsche 356 | - | Central | 30 | Flat tire. |
| 10 | EP | 19th | (United States) Harro Zitza | 24 | Porsche 356 | - | Southeast | 24 | |
| 11 | EP | 14th | (United States) Bert Miller | 52 | Austin-Healey 100-6 | - | Southwest | 16 | |
| DNF | EP | 6th | (United States) Peter Hutchinson | 32 | Porsche 356 | - | Central | 29 | DNF |
| DNF | EP | 17th | (United States) Robert Kirby | 64 | Porsche 356 | - | Pacific | 29 | DNF |
| DNF | EP | 16th | (United States) William McKemie | 53 | Elva Courier | - | Southwest | 26 | DNF |
| DNF | EP | 2nd | (United States) George Frey | 12 | Porsche 356 Speedster | - | Northeast | 9 | DNF |
| DNF | EP | 12th | (United States) Larry Myers | 43 | Porsche 356 | - | Midwest | 7 | DNF |
| DNF | EP | 1st | (United States) Bert Everett | 11 | Porsche 356 Speedster | - | Northeast | 6 | DNF |
| DNF | EP | 13th | (United States) Dale Hersh | 61 | Porsche 356 | - | Pacific | 0 | DNF |

=== Race 7 - C & D Production ===
C Production and D Production cars raced in a multi-class race held on November 28 on the 3,1-mile course for 45 minutes and 24 laps.

| Pos | Class | Qualified in class | Driver | No. | Car | Entrant | Division | Laps | Info |
|---|---|---|---|---|---|---|---|---|---|
| 1 | **CP** | **4th** | **(United States) Bill Young** | **63** | **Lotus Elan** | - | **Pacific** | **24** | |
| 2 | CP | 3rd | (United States) Flip Groggins | 11 | Lotus Elan | - | Northeast | 24 | |
| 3 | CP | 9th | (United States) Joe Ward | 62 | Lotus Elan | - | Pacific | 24 | |
| 4 | CP | 5th | (United States) Chuck Stoddard | 31 | Alfa Romeo Giulia TZ | - | Central | 24 | |
| 5 | **DP** | **6th** | **(United States) Steve Froines** | **62** | **Triumph TR4** | - | **Pacific** | **23** | |
| 6 | DP | 2nd | (United States) Bob Tullius | 11 | Triumph TR4 | Group 44 | Northeast | 23 | |
| 7 | DP | 5th | (United States) Lee Herbert | 63 | Triumph TR4 | - | Pacific | 23 | Led laps 11–17, spun. |
| 8 | DP | 3rd | (United States) Brad Picard | 13 | MG MGB | - | Northeast | 23 | |
| 9 | DP | 1st | (United States) Dick Stockton | 12 | Triumph TR4 | - | Northeast | 23 | Led laps 1–10. |
| 10 | DP | 9th | (United States) Charles Slade | 23 | Porsche 911 | - | Southeast | 22 | |
| 11 | CP | 7th | (United States) Jim Harris | 43 | Lotus Elan | - | Midwest | 21 | |
| 12 | DP | 13th | (United States) Joe Locario | 51 | Alfa Romeo Giulia | - | Southwest | 20 | |
| 13 | CP | 8th | (United States) Jim Kauffman | 53 | Lotus Super Seven | - | Southwest | 20 | |
| 14 | DP | 15th | (United States) Lynn Beaumont | 52 | Austin-Healey 3000 | - | Southwest | 17 | |
| 15 | DP | 11th | (United States) Bill Maloney | 32 | Austin-Healey 3000 | - | Central | 13 | |
| DNF | DP | 10th | (United States) Tommy Charles | 22 | MG MGB | - | Southeast | 12 | DNF |
| DNF | DP | 12th | (United States) Bill Frank | 55 | Triumph TR4 | - | Southwest | 12 | DNF |
| DNF | DP | 8th | (United States) Bill Pendleton | 61 | Triumph TR4 | - | Pacific | 9 | DNF |
| DNF | CP | 6th | (United States) Ted Clark | 33 | Lotus Super Seven | - | Central | 3 | DNF |
| DNF | CP | 2nd | (United States) Ed Tucker | 52 | Lotus Elan | - | Southwest | 3 | DNF |
| DNF | DP | 14th | (United States) John McComb | 42 | MG MGB | - | Midwest | 2 | DNF |
| DNF | DP | 7th | (United States) Roger West | 21 | MG MGB | - | Southeast | 1 | DNF |
| DNF | DP | 4th | (United States) Vic Campell | 41 | Triumph TR4 | - | Midwest | 1 | DNF |
| DNF | CP | 1st | (United States) Lou Sell | 65 | Lotus Super Seven | - | Pacific | 1 | DNF |

=== Race 8 - Formula A, B & C ===
Formula B and Formula C cars raced in a multi-class race held on November 28 on the 1,6-mile course for 45 minutes and 38 laps. Despite the 3-litre Formula A already being introduced, the number of cars was so small that no drivers were invited.

| Pos | Class | Qualified in class | Driver | No. | Car | Entrant | Division | Laps | Info |
|---|---|---|---|---|---|---|---|---|---|
| 1 | **FB** | **2nd** | **(United States) Earl Jones** | **62** | **LeGrand Mk3B-Alfa Romeo** | - | **Pacific** | **38** | **Led laps 32–38.** |
| 2 | FB | 1st | (United States) Stew McMillen | 31 | Lotus 27-Ford | - | Central | 38 | Led laps 1-31. |
| 3 | FB | 4th | (United States) Alan Gottlieb | 12 | Lotus 22-Ford | - | Northeast | 37 | |
| 4 | FB | 5th | (United States) Bob McQueen | 21 | Formcar-Porsche | - | Southeast | 37 | |
| 5 | FB | 8th | (United States) Boyd Groberg | 64 | Lotus 22-Ford | - | Pacific | 36 | |
| 6 | FB | 3rd | (United States) Gaston Andrey | 11 | Lotus 21-Alfa Romeo | - | Northeast | 36 | |
| 7 | **FC** | **3rd** | **(United States) Larry Skeels** | **31** | **Cooper T59-BMC** | - | **Central** | **36** | |
| 8 | FC | 1st | (United States) Mark Donohue | 11 | Lotus 20B-Ford | - | Northeast | 36 | |
| 9 | FC | 7th | (United States) Reg Howell | 32 | Cooper | - | Central | 36 | |
| 10 | FB | 7th | (United States) Alson Brizard | 61 | Cooper T56-Alfa Romeo | - | Pacific | 35 | |
| 11 | FC | 2nd | (United States) Tom Clark | 34 | Lotus 18 | - | Central | 35 | |
| 12 | FC | 10th | (United States) Nick Reynolds | 62 | Lotus 22 | - | Pacific | 35 | |
| 13 | FC | 9th | (United States) Jim Haynes | 14 | Quantum-SAAB | - | Northeast | 33 | |
| 14 | FC | 5th | (United States) Tommy Bunn | 51 | LeGrand Mk3 | - | Southwest | 28 | |
| 15 | FC | 4th | (United States) Clint Cavin | 44 | Cooper | - | Midwest | 28 | |
| DNF | FC | 6th | (United States) Karl Knapp | 61 | LeGrand Mk3 | - | Pacific | 28 | DNF |
| DNF | FB | 6th | (United States) Don Burris | 15 | Cooper-Ford | - | Northeast | 11 | DNF |
| DNF | FC | 11th | (United States) Nick Dioguardi | 63 | Brabham BT6-Cosworth | - | Pacific | 7 | DNF |
| DNF | FC | 8th | (United States) Bill Rutan | 13 | Quantum-SAAB | - | Northeast | 6 | DNF |

=== Race 9 - Formula Vee ===
The Formula Vee race was held on November 28 on the 1,6-mile course for 45 minutes and 33 laps.

| Pos | Class | Qualified in class | Driver | No. | Car | Entrant | Division | Laps | Info |
|---|---|---|---|---|---|---|---|---|---|
| 1 | FV | 2nd | (United States) Dan Fowler | 33 | Beach Mk 5-VW | - | Central | 33 | Led laps 1-33. |
| 2 | FV | 3rd | (United States) Boyd Hough | 61 | Formcar-VW | - | Pacific | 33 | |
| 3 | FV | 5th | (United States) Joseph Dodge | 12 | Autodynamics-VW | - | Northeast | 33 | |
| 4 | FV | 7th | (United States) Bill Campbell | 22 | Zink Z-5-VW | - | Southeast | 33 | |
| 5 | FV | 6th | (United States) Rick Koehler | 31 | Bobsy Vanguard-VW | - | Central | 33 | |
| 6 | FV | 8th | (United States) Bill Scott | 13 | Autodynamics-VW | - | Northeast | 33 | |
| 7 | FV | 10th | (United States) Walter Glenn | 24 | Beach Mk 5-VW | - | Southeast | 33 | |
| 8 | FV | 9th | (United States) Robert Samm | 52 | Autodynamics-VW | - | Southwest | 32 | |
| 9 | FV | 11th | (United States) Robert Hubbard | 41 | Sardini-VW | - | Midwest | 32 | |
| 10 | FV | 12th | (United States) Ray Pickering | 43 | Sardini Mk II-VW | - | Midwest | 32 | |
| 11 | FV | 13th | (United States) Bob Costey | 56 | Beach Mk 5-VW | - | Southwest | 32 | |
| DNF | FV | 4th | (United States) Whitney Tharin | 21 | Formcar-VW | - | Southeast | 26 | DNF (throttle cable) |
| DNF | FV | 1st | (United States) Chet Freeman | 32 | Bobsy Vanguard-VW | - | Central | 16 | DNF |

=== Race 10 - A & B Production ===
A Production and B Production drivers raced in a multi-class race held on November 28 on the 3,1-mile course for 45 minutes and 25 laps.

| Pos | Class | Qualified in class | Driver | No. | Car | Entrant | Division | Laps | Info |
|---|---|---|---|---|---|---|---|---|---|
| 1 | **AP** | **1st** | **(United States) Harold Keck** | **11** | **Shelby Cobra 427** | - | **Northeast** | **25** | |
| 2 | AP | 2nd | (United States) George Montgomery | 31 | Shelby Cobra 427 | - | Central | 25 | |
| 3 | AP | 4th | (United States) Foster Alexander | 62 | Shelby Cobra | - | Pacific | 25 | |
| 4 | **BP** | **3rd** | **(United States) Jerry Titus** | **61** | **Shelby GT350** | - | **Pacific** | **25** | |
| 5 | BP | 4th | (United States) Bob Johnson | 31 | Shelby GT350 | - | Midwest | 25 | |
| 6 | BP | 5th | (United States) Don Yenko | 12 | Chevrolet Corvette | - | Northeast | 25 | |
| 7 | BP | 6th | (United States) Walt Hane | 23 | Shelby GT350 | - | Southeast | 24 | |
| 8 | AP | 5th | (United States) Bob Fryer | 13 | Chevrolet Corvette Sting Ray | - | Northeast | 24 | |
| 9 | BP | 10th | (United States) Merle Brennan | 62 | Jaguar XKE | - | Pacific | 24 | |
| 10 | AP | 7th | (United States) Ralph Noseda | 26 | Shelby Cobra | - | Southeast | 23 | |
| 11 | BP | 7th | (United States) Tom Yeager | 32 | Shelby GT350 | - | Central | 23 | |
| 12 | AP | 6th | (United States) Robert Thorpe | 24 | Shelby Cobra | - | Southeast | 22 | |
| 13 | BP | 13th | (United States) Martin Krinner | 15 | Shelby GT350 | - | Northeast | 19 | |
| 14 | BP | 9th | (United States) John Bentley | 22 | Sunbeam Tiger | - | Southeast | 17 | |
| DNF | BP | 8th | (United States) Brad Brooker | 41 | Shelby GT350 | - | Midwest | 22 | DNF |
| DNF | AP | 3rd | (United States) Paul Sonda | 32 | Chevrolet Corvette Sting Ray | - | Central | 20 | DNF |
| DNF | BP | 1st | (United States) Mark Donohue | 11 | Shelby GT350 | - | Northeast | 18 | DNF |
| DNF | BP | 11th | (United States) David Dooley | 42 | Jaguar XKE | - | Midwest | 4 | DNF |
| DNF | BP | 2nd | (United States) Jim Adams | 63 | Sunbeam Tiger | - | Pacific | 1 | DNF (accident) |
| DNF | AP | 8th? | (United States) Dave Heinz | 33 | Chevrolet Corvette Sting Ray | - | Central | 0 | DNF (brakes) |
| DNF | BP | 12th | (United States) Don Sesslar | 33 | Sunbeam Tiger | - | Central | 0 | DNF (accident) |

=== Race 11 - C, D, E & F Modified ===
C Modified, D Modified, E Modified and F Modified drivers raced in a multi-class race held on November 28 on the 3,1-mile course for 45 minutes and 25 laps.

| Pos | Class | Qualified in class | Driver | No. | Car | Entrant | Division | Laps | Info |
|---|---|---|---|---|---|---|---|---|---|
| 1 | **CM** | **3rd** | **(United States) Joe Starkey** | **51** | **McLaren M1A-Chevrolet** | - | **Southwest** | **25** | |
| 2 | **EM** | **1st** | **(United States) Lewis Kerr** | **11** | **Brabham BT8-Coventry Climax** | - | **Northeast** | **25** | |
| 3 | EM | 3rd | (United States) Ralph Trieschmann | 31 | Elva Mk VII-Porsche | - | Central | 24 | |
| 4 | CM | 4th | (United States) Jerry Crawford | 13 | Lotus 30-Ford | - | Northeast | 24 | |
| 5 | **FM** | **1st/3rd** | **(United States) Brooke Doran** | **31** | **Elva Mk VII S-Porsche** | - | **Central** | **24** | |
| 6 | FM | 10th | (United States) Jack Slottag | 22 | Lotus 23B | - | Southeast | 24 | |
| 7 | FM | 3rd/1st | (United States) William Kneeland | 13 | Elva Mk VII S | - | Northeast | 24 | |
| 8 | FM | 4th | (United States) Ed Diamond | 12 | Elva Mk VII-Ford | - | Northeast | 24 | |
| 9 | FM | 6th | (United States) Frank Werber | 63 | Lotus 23B | - | Pacific | 23 | |
| 10 | EM | 2nd | (United States) Chuck Dietrich | 32 | Elva Mk VII S-BMW | - | Central | 23 | |
| 11 | CM | 5th | (United States) Herb Byrne | 23 | Jaguar XKE | - | Southeast | 23 | |
| 12 | **DM** | **1st** | **(United States) Charles Gates** | **61** | **Triumph TR4A** | - | **Pacific** | **23** | |
| 13 | FM | 11th | (United States) Walter Bass | 42 | Elva Mk VII S | - | Midwest | 21 | |
| 14 | DM | 2nd | (United States) R.P. McGuire | 51 | Maserati Tipo 61-Ferrari | - | Southwest | 21 | |
| 15 | FM | 7th | (United States) Cliff Apel | 36 | Bobcat (Bobsy SR2) | - | Central | 19 | |
| 16 | FM | 13th | (United States) E.B. Cicotte | 33 | Lotus 23B | - | Central | 18 | |
| 17 | DM | 3rd | (United States) Ed La Mantia | 63 | Genie Mk.5-Chevrolet | - | Pacific | 11 | |
| DNF | CM | 2nd | (United States) Dick Durant | 41 | Durant Special-Chevrolet | - | Midwest | 23 | DNF |
| DNF | FM | 2nd | (United States) Joe Hutchinson | 51 | Merlyn MK 6 | - | Southwest | 17 | DNF |
| DNF | FM | 9th | (United States) John Norris | 21 | Lotus 23B-Ford | - | Southeast | 10 | DNF |
| DNF | FM | 12th | (United States) Alan Friedland | 11 | Elva Mk VII | - | Northeast | 10 | DNF |
| DNF | FM | 8th | (United States) Del Russo Taylor | 41 | Lotus 23 | - | Midwest | 8 | DNF |
| DNF | CM | 1st | (United States) Ralph Salyer | 33 | McLaren M1A-Chevrolet | - | Central | 8 | DNF |
| DNF | EM | 4th | (United States) Bob Mouat | 14 | Cooper Monaco T49 | - | Northeast | 4 | DNF |
| DNF | FM | 5th | (United States) Charles Barns | 52 | Merlyn MK 6-Ford | - | Southwest | 1 | DNF |

== Notes ==
=== H Production ===
Turgeon and Barton are both listed as sixth-place qualifiers.

Only 15 cars qualified for the race, but Brownfield and Garrison are listed as 16th-place qualifiers.

=== E Production ===
Only 18 cars qualified for the race, but Zitza and Collins are listed as 19th- and 20th-place qualifiers.

=== Formula A, B & C ===
Only 19 cars qualified for the race, but SCCA's website lists 20th- and 21st-place qualifiers.

Bunn is said to drive a Lola T55 by some other sources.

=== A & B Production ===
Heinz's qualifying position is unknown, but the 16th-place qualifier is also unknown, so it is most likely that Heinz is the last qualifier in class.

=== C, D, E & F Modified ===
Only 25 cars qualified for the race, but most sources list 32nd- through 36th-place qualifiers.

Non-finishers' laps are listed differently on different sources.
