= SCCA National Championship Runoffs =

Championship road racing series

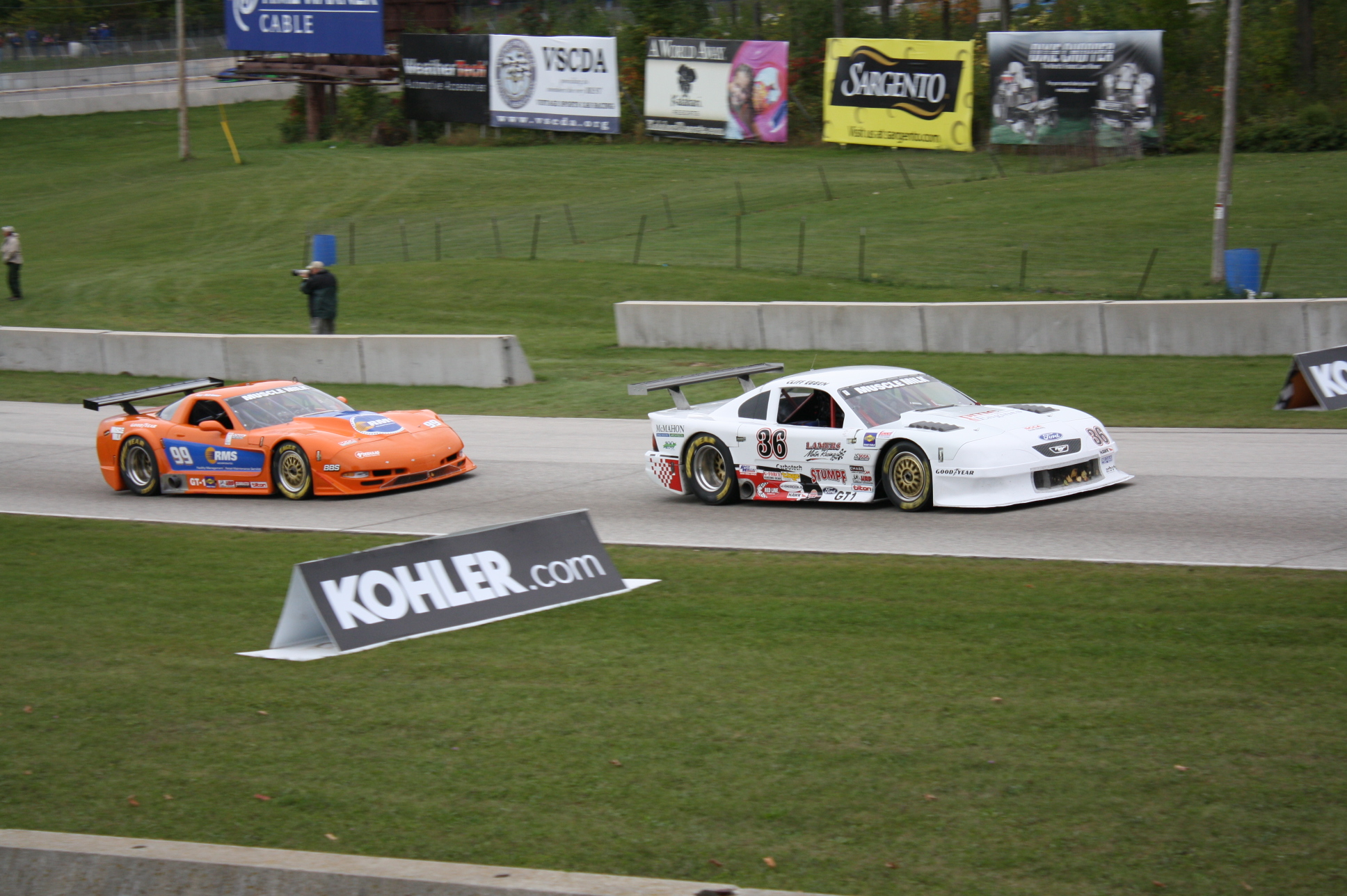
GT1

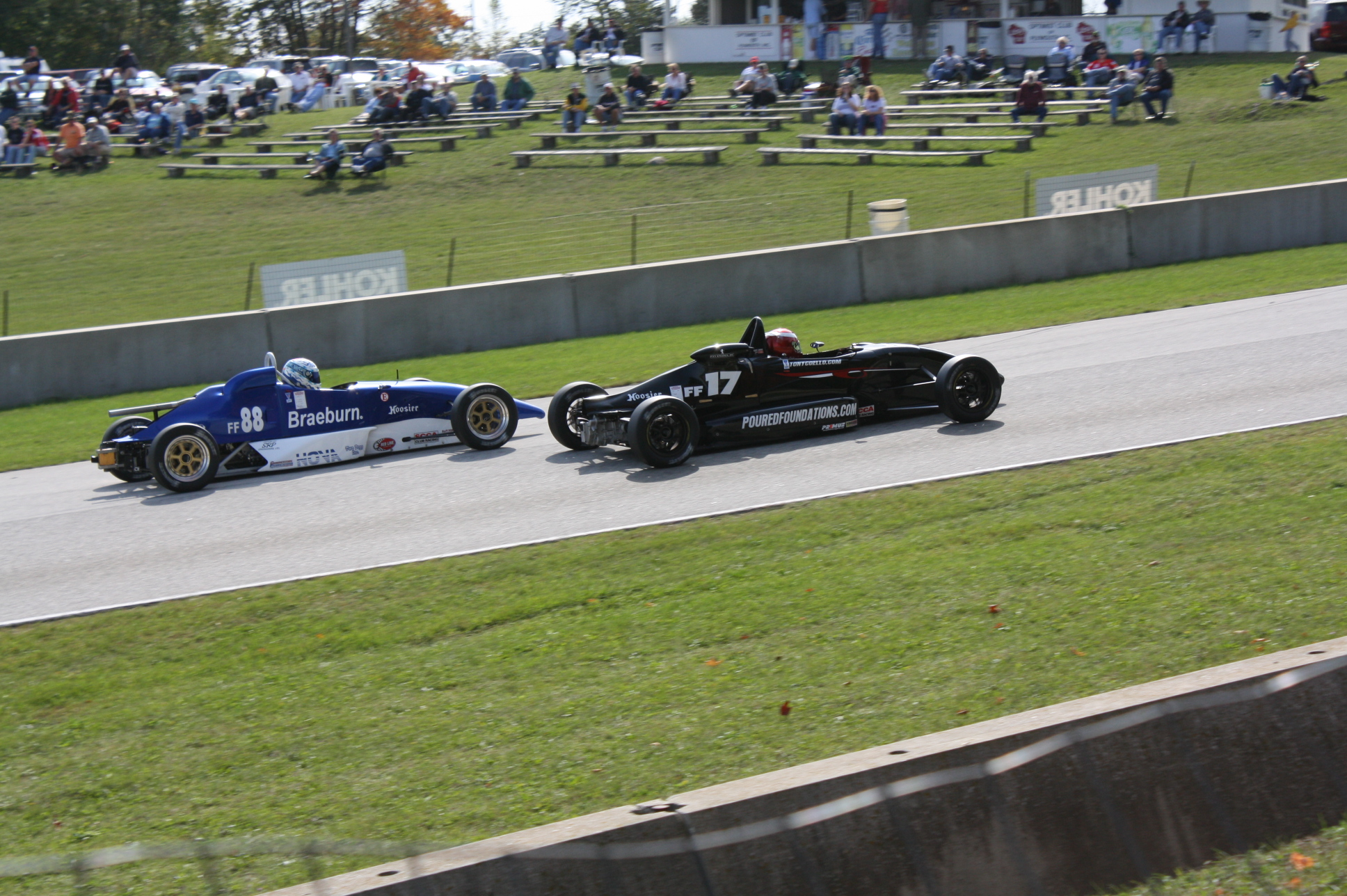
Formula Ford

GT1 and Formula Ford racing action at the 2009 SCCA Runoffs

The SCCA National Championship Runoffs is the end-of-year championship race meeting for Sports Car Club of America Club Racing competitors. Divisional champions and other top drivers from the SCCA's 116 regions are invited to participate at the Runoffs. National championships are awarded to the winners of each class.

The Runoffs is regarded as the "Olympics of Amateur Road Racing."

== History ==
The American Road Race of Champions (ARRC) began in 1964, as a non-championship round of the SCCA National Sports Car Championship. In 1965 the series was abolished, and national championships were awarded to each regional champion. The champions and other top drivers were invited to the ARRC. Beginning in 1966, only the winners at the ARRC were named national champions. In 1973, the event's name changed to the Champion Spark Plug Road Racing Classic. Valvoline became the primary sponsor in 1985, and the race became known as the Runoffs in 1987. Other primary sponsors of the race have included AT&T, Subway, Tire Rack, Garmin, and Sunoco.

=== Sites ===
For the first six years, the event alternated between Riverside International Raceway on the west coast and Daytona International Speedway on the east coast. The race found a permanent home at Road Atlanta in 1970, staying there until the track's bankruptcy in 1993. The Runoffs moved to Mid-Ohio from 1994 until 2005, then to Heartland Park Topeka from 2006 until 2008. The event moved to Road America in 2009 and was held there through 2013.

In July 2013, the SCCA announced, in a break from tradition, that the Runoffs would begin to move around venues across the country annually, similar to other major sporting events such as golf's U.S. Open and the NFL's Super Bowl. First up in 2014 was a return to the west coast and first time visit to Mazda Raceway Laguna Seca, which became just the seventh track to host the Runoffs. The event then alternated to the east coast in 2015 and visited Daytona International Speedway for the first time since 1969 before heading back to Mid-Ohio Sports Car Course in 2016. For 2017, the Runoffs was held on the road course at the Indianapolis Motor Speedway. In 2018, the Runoffs went back west to Sonoma Raceway. The 2019 Runoffs were held at Virginia International Raceway a track where the race has never been held. For 2020, the Runoffs returned to Road America to continue the annual rotation of East, Midwest, and West. The 2021 Runoffs remained in the Midwest, being held at the Indianapolis Motor Speedway.

As a result of changes announced starting in 2022, each venue will host the Runoffs for two consecutive years. Virginia International Raceway hosted the Runoffs for 2022-23. Because of transportation issues, the SCCA intends to only host the event east of the Mississippi River. The Runoffs will return to Road America in 2024–2026. On January 31, 2026, Michelin Raceway (formerly Road Atlanta) was announced as the site for 2027-28.

== Fatalities ==
Year	Driver	Track	Class	Car
1964	(United States) Jim Ladd	Riverside International Raceway	D Production	Austin-Healey 3000
1989	(United States) Scott Liebler	Road Atlanta	Formula Atlantic	Martini Mk. 53

== Race tracks ==
Track	Location	Years
Riverside International Raceway	Riverside, California	1964, 1966, 1968
Daytona International Speedway	Daytona Beach, Florida	1965, 1967, 1969, 2015
Michelin Raceway Road Atlanta	Braselton, Georgia	1970–1993, 2027-28
Mid-Ohio Sports Car Course	Lexington, Ohio	1994–2005, 2016
Heartland Motorsports Park	Topeka, Kansas	2006–2008
Road America	Elkhart Lake, Wisconsin	2009–2013, 2020, 2024–2026
WeatherTech Raceway Laguna Seca	Monterey, California	2014
Indianapolis Motor Speedway	Speedway, Indiana	2017, 2021
Sonoma Raceway	Sonoma, California	2018
Virginia International Raceway	Alton, Virginia	2019, 2022–2023
