= Scott Liebler =

Scott Liebler (December 22, 1959 – October 14, 1989) was a racing driver from Manhattan, Kansas. To date, Liebler is one of two racing deaths during the SCCA National Championship Runoffs, along with Jim Ladd.

== Racing career ==
After competing in autocross, Liebler raced in various SCCA single seater classes since 1979. Liebler was set to make his Runoffs debut in 1983. In a Citation-Zink Z18B, he failed to qualify in the Formula Vee class. He returned in 1985 in the Formula Atlantic class in a Ralt RT4. Liebler qualified eleventh and finished the race in ninth place. Between 1986 and 1989, he won the Midwest Division championship in the Formula Atlantic class four consecutive times. In 1987, Liebler had a heavy crash at the Lake Afton Grand Prix, near Wichita, Kansas. At the street circuit. Liebler hit a pole splitting his car in two pieces. In the violent crash, he suffered a broken pelvis, cracked teeth and double vision for almost six months.

Liebler's best result at the Runoffs came in 1988. At Road Atlanta, he finished in fourth place. The following year, Liebler competed at his home track, Heartland Park Topeka, in the Atlantic Championship East championship race. Liebler finished thirteenth overall, third in the B Class for older cars.

=== Fatal accident ===
As he won the SCCA Midwest Division championship in the Formula Atlantic class, Liebler qualified to compete in the SCCA National Championship Runoffs. The fast driver ran a Martini Mk.53 with a Volkswagen engine. Liebler qualified in eighth place for the race on Saturday. In turn 11 corner, Liebler's front tire touched the rear tire of Jim Brouk's Ralt RT4. Liebler's car launched into the air and rolled several times before coming to rest a 100 yards after the crash.

The injured driver was transported to Northeast Georgia Medical Center in nearby Gainesville, Georgia. Liebler died Sunday night of Cerebral edema.

== Complete motorsports results ==
=== SCCA National Championship Runoffs ===
Year	Track	Car	Engine	Class	Finish	Start	Status
1983	Road Atlanta	Citation-Zink Z18B	Volkswagen	Formula Vee	DNS	DNQ	Running
1985	Road Atlanta	Ralt RT4	Ford	Formula Atlantic	9	11	Running
1987	Road Atlanta	Ralt RT4	Ford	Formula Atlantic	5	7	Running
1988	Road Atlanta	Ralt RT4	Ford	Formula Atlantic	4	4	Running
1989	Road Atlanta	Martini Mk.53	Volkswagen	Formula Atlantic	DNF	8	Retired
