= Triumph Spitfire =

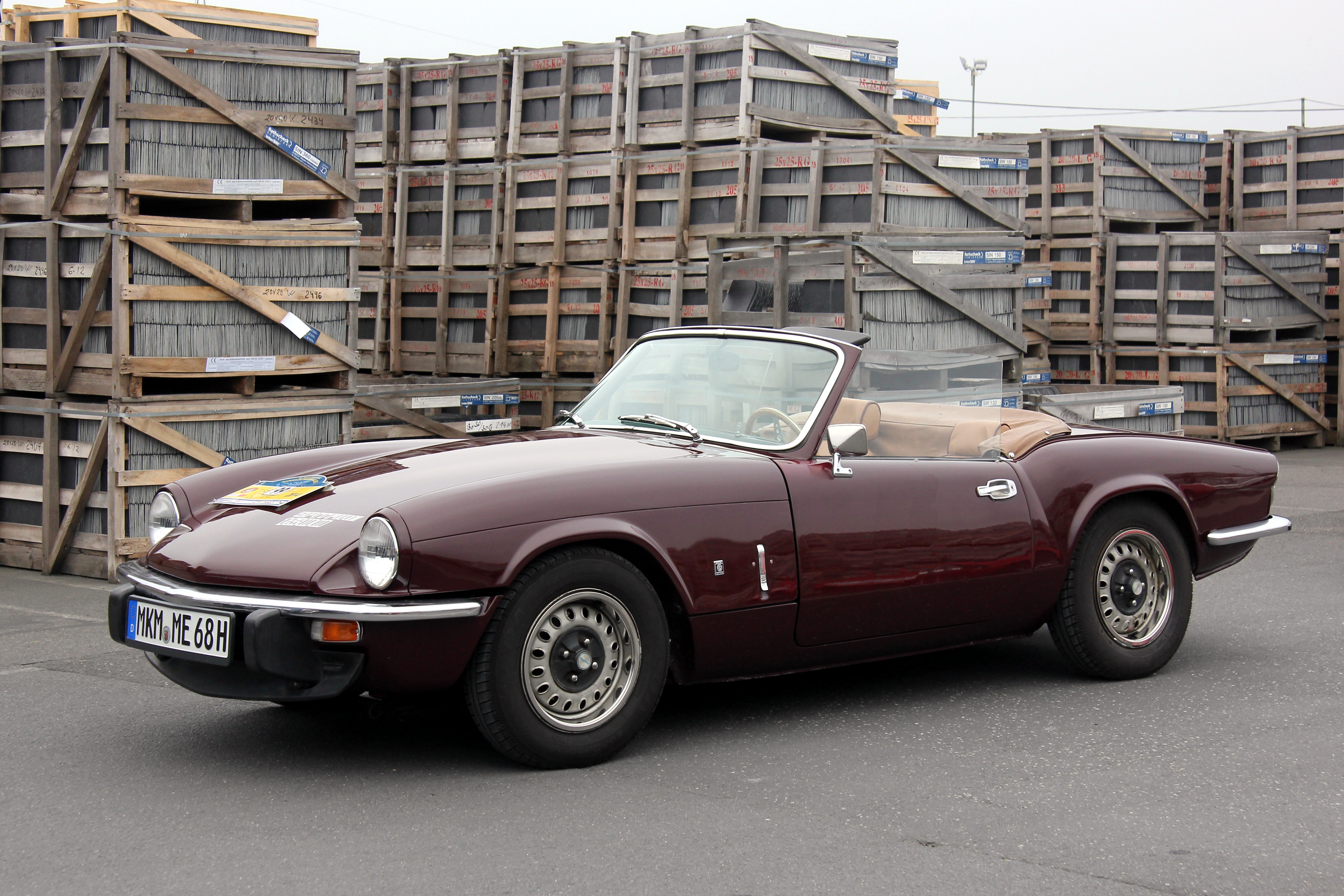
- Triumph Spitfire 1500 (European market)

Overview
- Manufacturer: Standard Motor Company; Triumph Motor Company (Leyland Motors)
- Production: 1962–1980
- Assembly: United Kingdom: Canley, Coventry; Australia: Port Melbourne (AMI); Belgium: Mechelen; Ireland: Dublin (7-prefix on commission number); South Africa: Durban (Motor Assemblies); South Africa: Cape Town (Leykor)
- Designer: Giovanni Michelotti

Body and chassis
- Class: sports car
- Body style: 2-seat drophead coupé
- Layout: FR layout
- Related: Triumph Herald; Triumph Vitesse; Triumph GT6

Dimensions
- Wheelbase: 83 in (2,108 mm)
- Length: 145 in (3,683 mm)
- Width: 57 in (1,448 mm)
- Height: 48 in (1,219 mm) hood up.
- Kerb weight: 1,568 to 1,759 lb (711 to 798 kg) (unladen U.K. spec)

The Triumph Spitfire is a British sports car manufactured over five production iterations between 1962 and 1980. Styled for Standard-Triumph in 1957 by Italian designer Giovanni Michelotti, the Spitfire was introduced at the London Motor Show in 1962. It was manufactured at the Standard-Triumph Canley works, with approximately 315,000 produced over 18 years.

Developed on a shortened variant of the Triumph Herald saloon's chassis, the Spitfire shared the Herald's running gear and Standard SC engine. The design used body-on-frame construction, augmented by structural components within the bodywork and rear trailing arms attached to the body rather than the chassis. A manually deployable convertible top, substantially improved on later models, provided weather protection and a bespoke hard-top was available as a factory option.

The model was named after the famed Supermarine Spitfire fighter plane of World War II.

== Generations ==
The Spitfire evolved over five iterations:

Model name	Engine	Year	Number built
Triumph Spitfire 4 (Mark I)	1147 cc inline-four	Oct 1962 – Dec 1964	45,753
Triumph Spitfire 4 Mark II	1147 cc inline-four	Dec 1964 – Jan 1967	37,409
Triumph Spitfire Mark III	1296 cc inline-four	Jan 1967– Dec 1970	65,320
Triumph Spitfire Mark IV	1296 cc inline-four	Nov 1970 – Dec 1974	70,021
Triumph Spitfire 1500	1493 cc inline-four	Dec 1974 – Aug 1980	95,829

== Origins ==
The Spitfire was conceived of by Standard-Triumph to compete in the small sports car market against the Austin-Healey Sprite, codenamed as "Project Bomb". The Sprite used the drive train of the Austin A30/A35 in a new lightweight body, while the Spitfire used mechanicals from the Herald saloon. Where the Austin A30 used unitary construction, the Herald used a separate backbone chassis — which Triumph was able to downsize, saving the cost of developing a completely new chassis-body unit.

Giovanni Michelotti, who had designed the Herald, styled the bodywork, which featured wind-down windows (in contrast to the Sprite and Midget, which used side curtains) and a cowl composed of the bonnet and wings that opened forward for engine access. The Spitfire's introduction was delayed by its company's financial troubles in the early 1960's and was subsequently announced shortly after Standard Triumph was taken over by Leyland Motors. While taking stock of their new acquisition, Leyland officials found Michelotti's prototype under a dust sheet in a factory corner, and quickly approved it for production.

== Spitfire 4 or Mark I (1962–1964) ==
Triumph Spitfire 4 (Mark I)
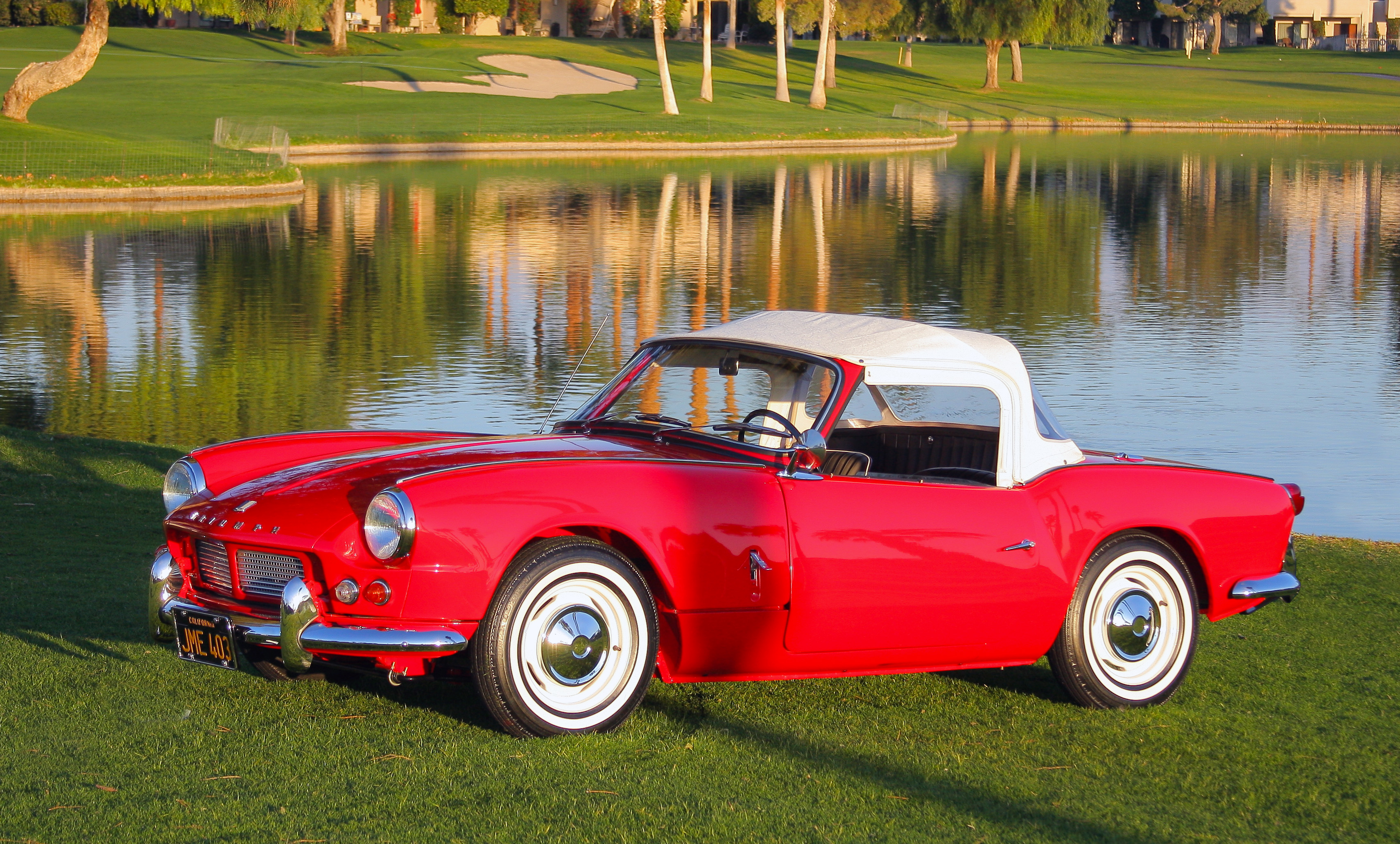

Overview
- Production: 1962–1964; 45,753 made

Powertrain
- Engine: 1,147 cc (70.0 cu in) OHV Standard SC engine I4
- Transmission: 4-speed manual with optional overdrive on top and third from 1963 onwards

Dimensions
- Kerb weight: 1,568 lb (711 kg) (unladen U.K.-spec)

The production design changed little from the prototype: the full-width rear bumper was replaced by two part-bumpers curving around each corner, with overriders. Mechanicals derived from the Herald saloon/sedan, with the notable addition of front disc brakes. Bodywork was bolted to the much-modified Herald chassis, the outer rails and the rear outriggers having been removed; with structural outer sills to stiffen the overall design.

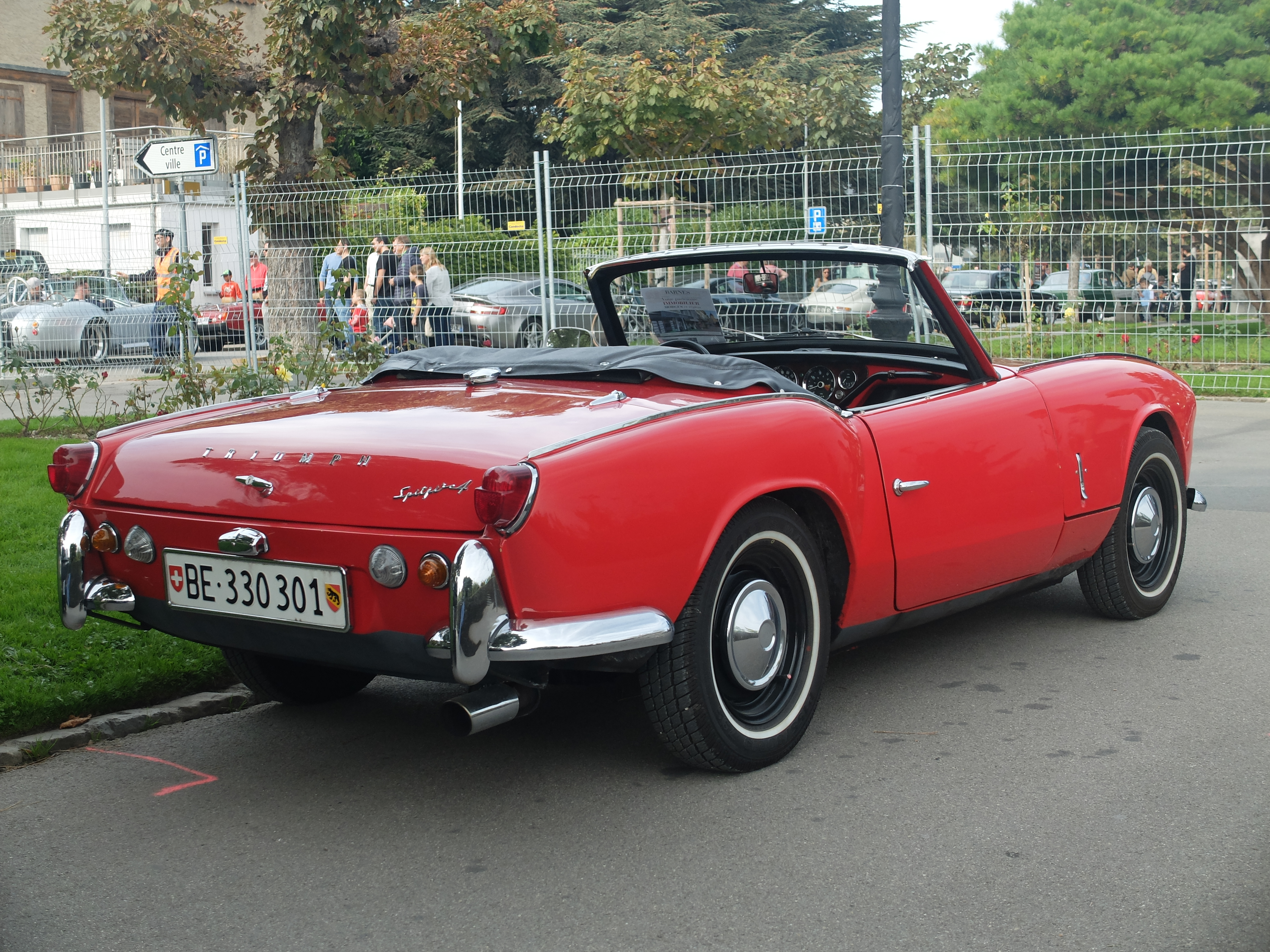
Rear view

The engine was an 1,147 cc (70.0 cu in) four-cylinder with a pushrod OHV cylinder head and two valves per cylinder, using twin SU carburettors. The Herald's rack and pinion steering and coil-and-wishbone front suspension carried over, having derived from systems used by the former Alford & Alder company that had been acquired by Standard-Triumph in 1959.

Rear suspension was by a single transverse-leaf swing axle, an arrangement, that unless ameliorated by any of several options, can allow rear tyres to undergo large camber changes during fast cornering, leading to oversteer – a dynamically unstable condition in which a vehicle can lose control and spin. As did many manufacturers who used a swing axle arrangement (e.g., Mercedes, Renault, Volkswagen), Triumph would later modify the rear suspension. In 1970, the rear suspension was decambered, by incorporating what Triumph called a "swing spring". One leaf was eliminated from the stack and only the bottom leaf was attached rigidly to the differential. The remaining leaves were mounted to pivot freely — thereby eliminating the worst characteristics of the original swing-axle design.

The Spitfire was an inexpensive small sports car and as such received rather basic trim by today's standards, including rubber mats and a large plastic steering wheel. It was nonetheless considered fairly comfortable at the time, as it had wind-down windows and exterior door locks, as well as relatively full instrumentation. These early cars were referred to both as "Triumph Spitfire Mark Is" and "Spitfire 4s", different from the later Spitfire Mark IV. The "Spitfire 4" name indicated the possibility of the appearance of a six-cylinder version.

In UK specification the inline four produced 63 bhp (47 kW) at 5,750 rpm, and 67 lb⋅ft (91 N⋅m) of torque at 3,500 rpm. This gave a top speed of 92 mph (148 km/h), and a 0 to 60 mph (97 km/h) acceleration in 16.4 seconds. Average fuel consumption was 31 mpg.

For 1964 an overdrive became optional to the four-speed manual gearbox. Wire wheels and a hard top were also available.

== Spitfire Mark II (1965–1967) ==
Triumph Spitfire Mark II
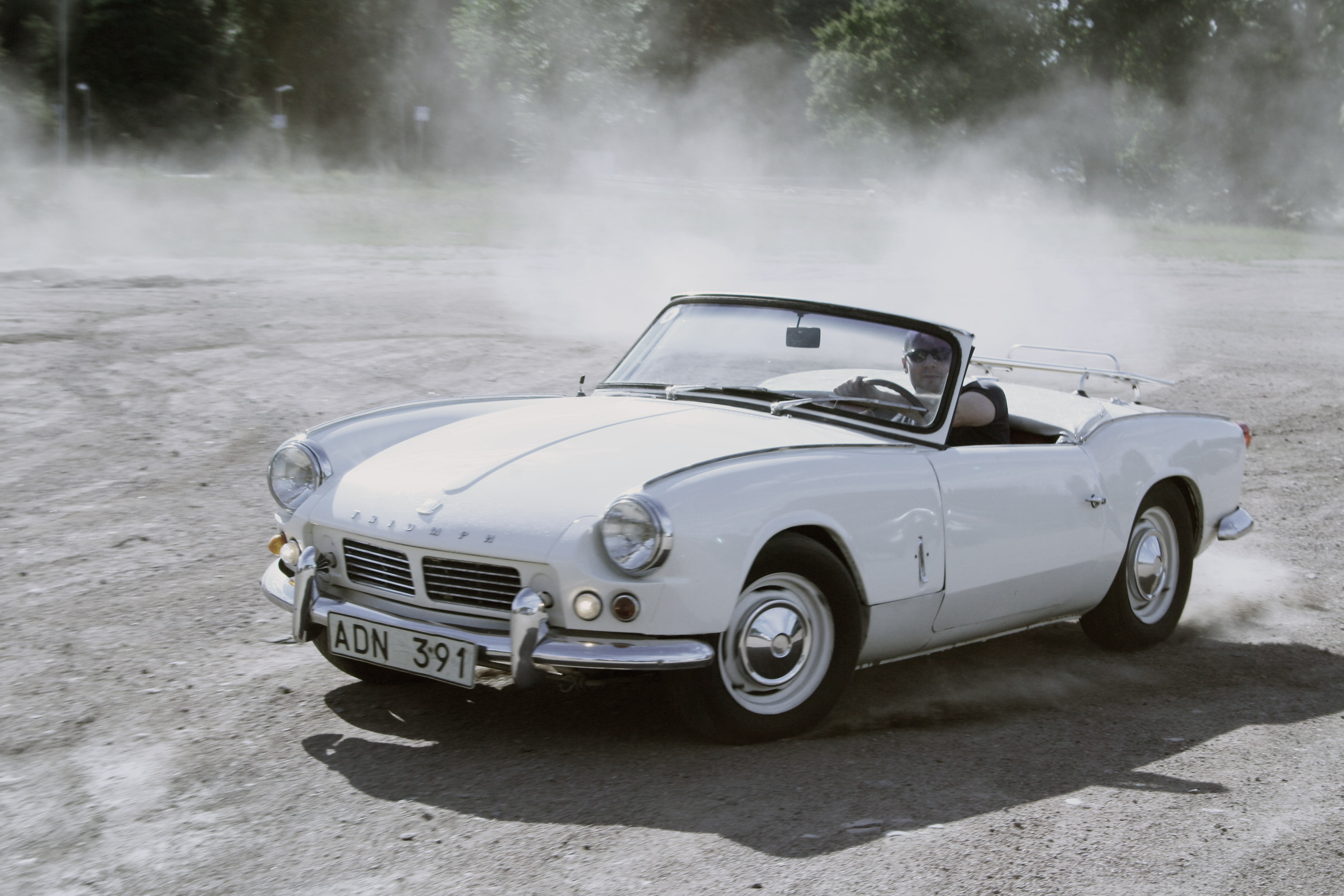

Overview
- Production: 1965–1967; 37,409 made

Powertrain
- Engine: 1,147 cc (70.0 cu in) Standard SC I4
- Transmission: 4-speed manual with optional overdrive on top and third

Dimensions
- Kerb weight: 1,568 lb (711 kg)(unladen U.K.spec)

In March 1965 the Spitfire Mark II launched with a retuned engine, featuring a revised camshaft profile, water-heated intake manifold, and tubular exhaust manifold, increasing power to 67 bhp (50 kW) at 6,000 rpm. The coil-spring design clutch of the Mark I was replaced with a Borg & Beck diaphragm spring clutch; North American models retained the coil-spring housing and were also equipped with ACDelco distributors. Exterior trim featured a new grille and badges, and the interior featured revised seats, covering most exposed surfaces with rubber cloth. Carpeting replaced the original moulded rubber floor mats.

Its base price was £550; the Austin-Healey Sprite's was £505 and the MG Midget's £515. Top speed was claimed to be 96 mph (154 km/h) and its 0–60 mph time of 14.8 seconds was considered "lively". The factory claimed that at highway speeds (70 mph (110 km/h)) the car achieved 38.1 miles per imperial gallon (7.41 L/100 km; 31.7 mpg_{‑US}).

== Spitfire Mark III (1967–1970) ==
Triumph Spitfire Mark III
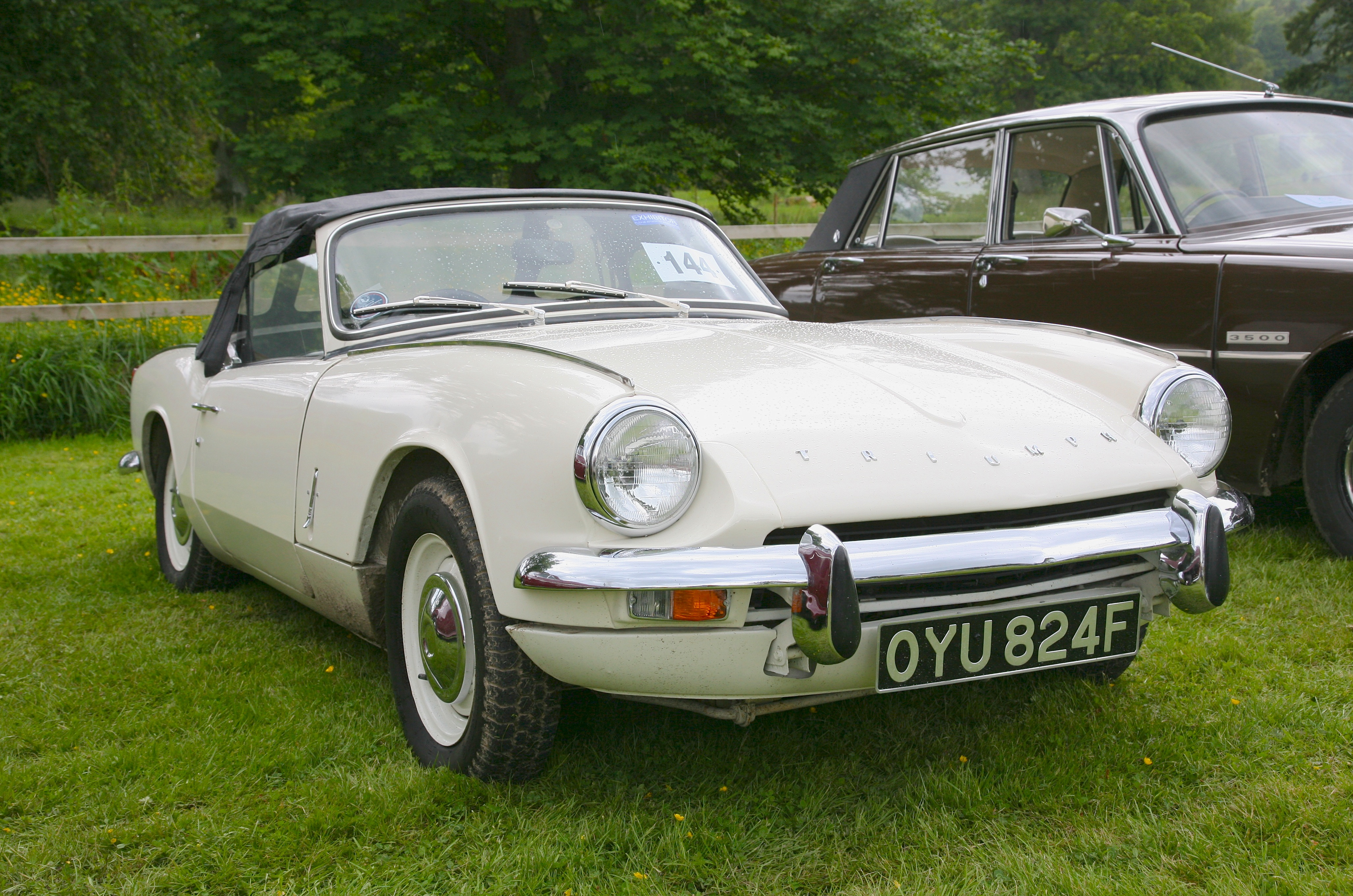

Overview
- Production: 1967–1970; 65,320 made

Powertrain
- Engine: 1,296 cc (79.1 cu in) Standard SC I4
- Transmission: 4-speed manual with optional overdrive on top and third

Dimensions
- Kerb weight: 1,568 lb (711 kg)(unladen U.K.spec)

The Mark III, introduced in March 1967, was the first major facelift to the Spitfire. The front bumper was raised in response to new crash regulations, and the front coil springs were slightly raised. Slightly revised bonnet pressings were carried over. Rear overriders were deleted and bumper mounted reversing lights became standard (initially as two separate lights on either side of the number plate, latterly as a single light in a new unit above the number plate). The interior received a wood-veneer instrument surround and a smaller, 15-inch, wire spoked steering wheel. A folding hood replaced the earlier, more complicated design. For most of the Mark III range, the instrument cluster remained centre-mounted (as in the Mark I and Mark II), easily accommodating right-hand and left-hand drive versions.

The 1,147 cc engine was replaced with a bored-out 1,296 cc unit (the bore increasing from 69.3 mm (2.73 in) to 73.7 mm (2.90 in), stroke retained at 76 mm (3.0 in)), as fitted on the new Triumph Herald 13/60 and Triumph 1300 saloons. A new quieter exhaust gave a sweet distinct note and reduced cabin noise. In SU twin-carburettor form, the engine put out a claimed 75 bhp (56 kW) at 6,000 rpm, and 75 lb⋅ft (102 N⋅m) of torque at 4,000 rpm, and made the Mark III a comparatively quick car by the standards of the day. Options included wire wheels, factory hard top and a Laycock de Normanville overdrive. The Mark III was the fastest Spitfire yet, achieving 60 mph (97 km/h) in 13.4 seconds, and reaching a top speed of 95 mph (153 km/h). Average fuel consumption was 33mpg. The Mark III continued production into 1971, well after introduction of the Mark IV.

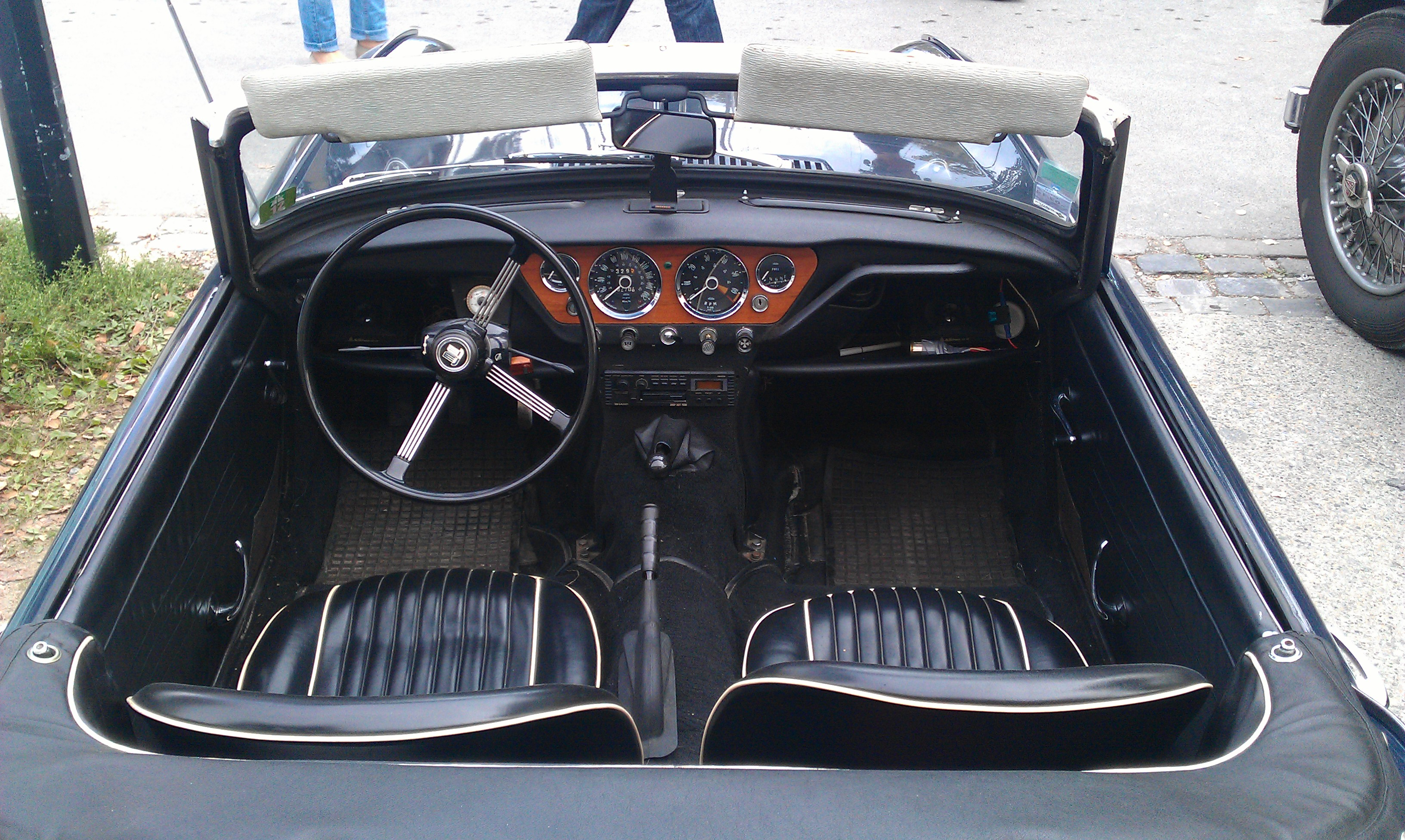
Interior

On 8 February 1968, Standard-Triumph general manager George Turnbull drove the 100,000th Triumph Spitfire off the Canley production line. More than 75% of this number had been exported outside the UK, including 45% to the US and 25% to mainland European markets.

The 1968 model featured dual system (also known as tandem) brakes with a brake failure warning device. The engine used a revised camshaft and a distributor with idle speed ignition timing retarded to address emissions. The twin SU carburettors now included overrun valves in the throttle discs and anti-tampering features on carburettor fuel-air mixture nuts.

Starting in 1969, US-bound models were "federalised" to comply with safety and emissions regulations. A reduced compression ratio of 8.5:1 resulted in a slight decrease in power (68 bhp) and 73 ft-lbs of torque. However, the 0–60 time of 14 seconds was still faster than the Mark II. The instrument panel was moved in front of the driver, and new seats were introduced with integrated headrests to help against whiplash. Cosmetically, the wood dash was replaced with a matte black finished assembly intended to imitate an aircraft cockpit.

The Mark III's final production year (1970) included an integrated rear reverse and license plate lamp, side lamps at the front and rear and new badging. The separate "Triumph" letters on the front of the bonnet were removed and "Triumph" and "Spitfire" rectangular badges were used in the front, rear sides and rear. A limited number of U.S. market 1970s were adorned with an RAF style "Spitfire" badge (U.K. models had a plain badge without the RAF roundel) that rested in the right corner (car opposing point of view) of the bonnet. Additional exterior changes introduced included a zip up rear window, black radiator grille and a black (vs body coloured) windscreen surround. Full wheel covers of two styles were used including the 1969 introduced model with "SPITFIRE" circumscribing the hub and a unique derivative without the branding. Interior changes included a steering column mounted ignition switch, a key-in-ignition warning buzzer, driver's side under-dash courtesy lamp and a new black spoked steering wheel. Under the bonnet, some markets had the twin SU carburettors replaced with a single Zenith-Stromberg carburettor.

== Spitfire Mark IV (1970–1974) ==
Triumph Spitfire Mark IV
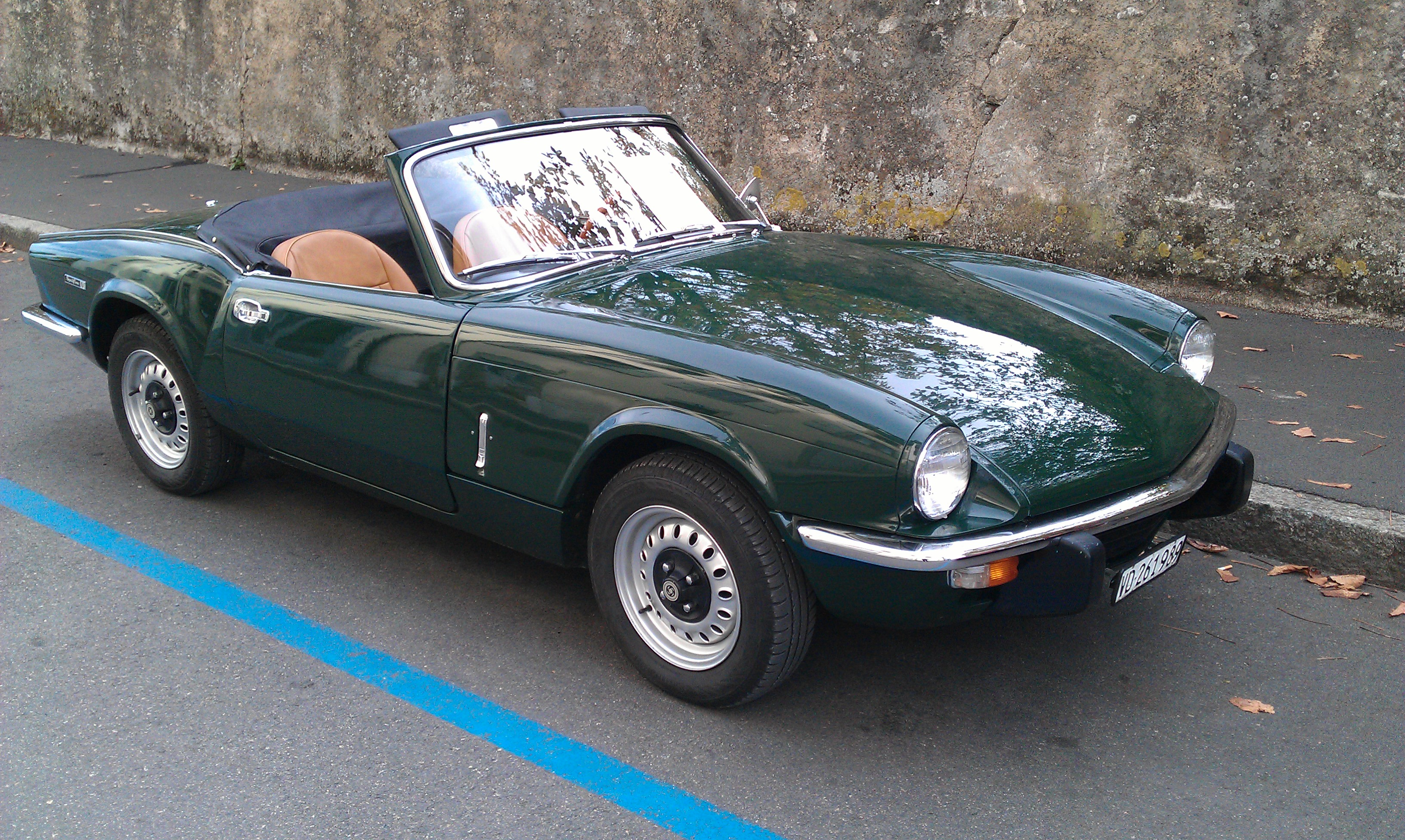
- Triumph Spitfire Mark IV

Overview
- Production: 1970–1974; 70,021 made

Powertrain
- Engine: 1,296 cc (79.1 cu in) Standard SC I4
- Transmission: 4-speed manual with optional overdrive on top and third

Dimensions
- Kerb weight: 1,717 lb (779 kg)(unladen UK spec)

The Mark IV featured a redesigned rear, similar to the Triumph Stag and Triumph 2000 models, both also designed by Michelotti. The front end was revised with a new bonnet pressing, eliminating the weld lines on top of the wings, door handles were recessed, the convertible top received squared-off corners. The interior was revised to include a full-width dashboard, with instruments ahead of the driver rather than over the centre console, initially finished in black plastic and then from 1973 finished in wood.

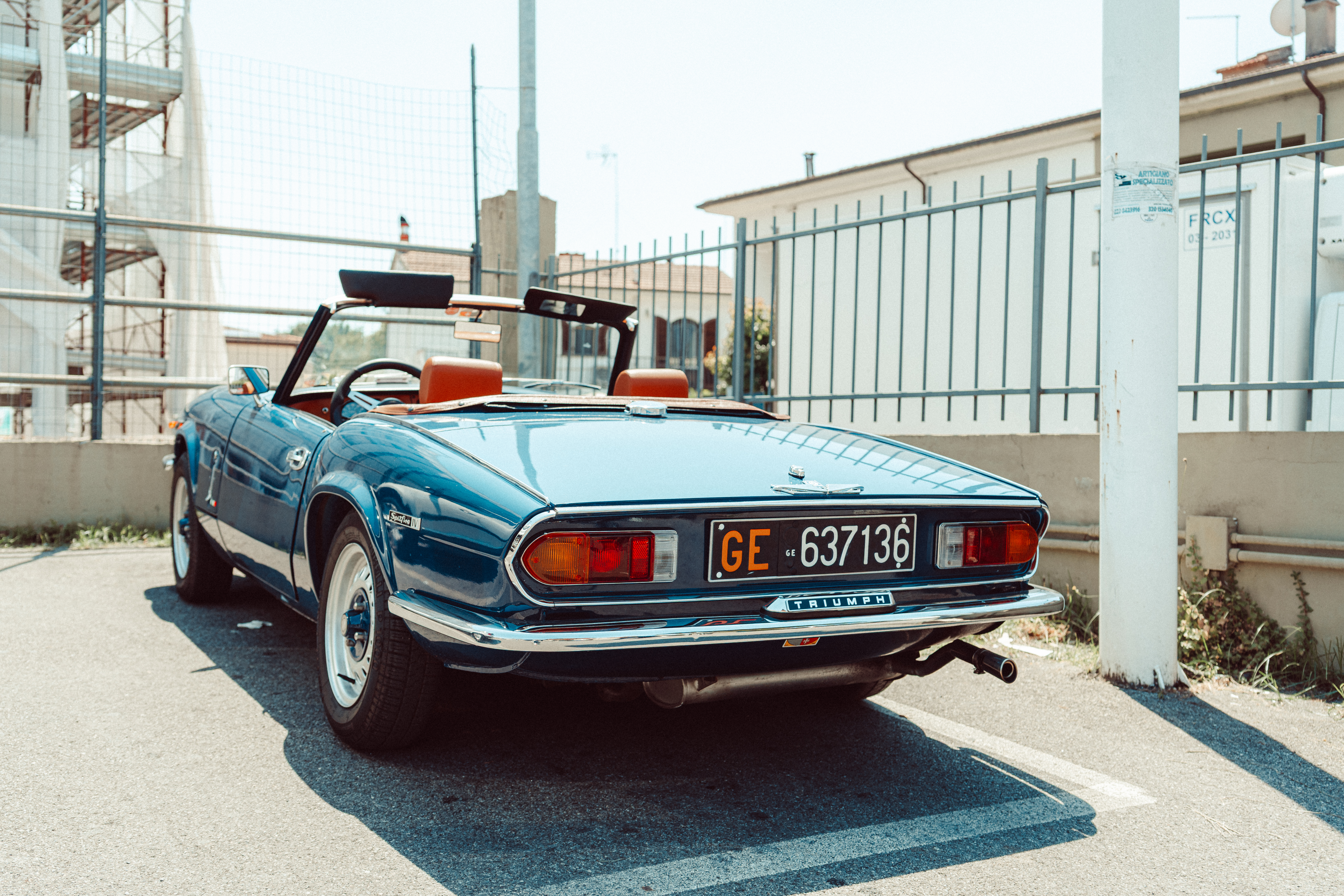
Rear view

The engine was now rated at 63 horsepower for the UK market, with a 9:1 compression ratio and twin SU HS2 carburettors. (The less powerful North American version continued to use a single Zenith Stromberg carburettor and an 8.5:1 compression ratio) due to the German DIN system; the output was the same for the early Mark IV. Performance was slower than the Mark III due to its weight increase and taller 3.89:1 final drive as opposed to the earlier 4.11:1.

The Mk. IV engine displaced 1,296 cc (79.1 cu in) throughout the production run, and in 1973 received larger big-end bearings to rationalise production with the TR6 2.5-litre engines. The engine was also detuned to meet new emissions regulations. With the overall weight also increasing to 1,717 lb (779 kg) performance dropped, with 0 to 60 mph (0 to 97 km/h) now in 15.8 seconds and top speed reduced to 90 mph (140 km/h). Fuel economy was 32 mpg_{‑imp} (8.8 L/100 km; 26.6 mpg_{‑US}).

A revised hardtop also became available, with rear quarter-lights and a flatter rear screen.

Importantly, the heavily criticised rear suspension was decambered, incorporating what Triumph called a "swing spring". One leaf of the suspension "stack" was eliminated and only the bottom leaf was attached rigidly to the differential. The remaining leaves were mounted to pivot freely — eliminating the worst characteristics of the original swing-axle. This was a different approach than that taken with the Triumph GT6 Mk II (GT6+) and Triumph Vitesse Mark 2, both of which received new lower wishbones and Rotoflex half-shaft couplings. The result on all these cars was improved handling.

The Mark IV went on sale in the UK at the end of 1970 with a base price of £735.

== Spitfire 1500 (1974–1980) ==
Triumph Spitfire 1500
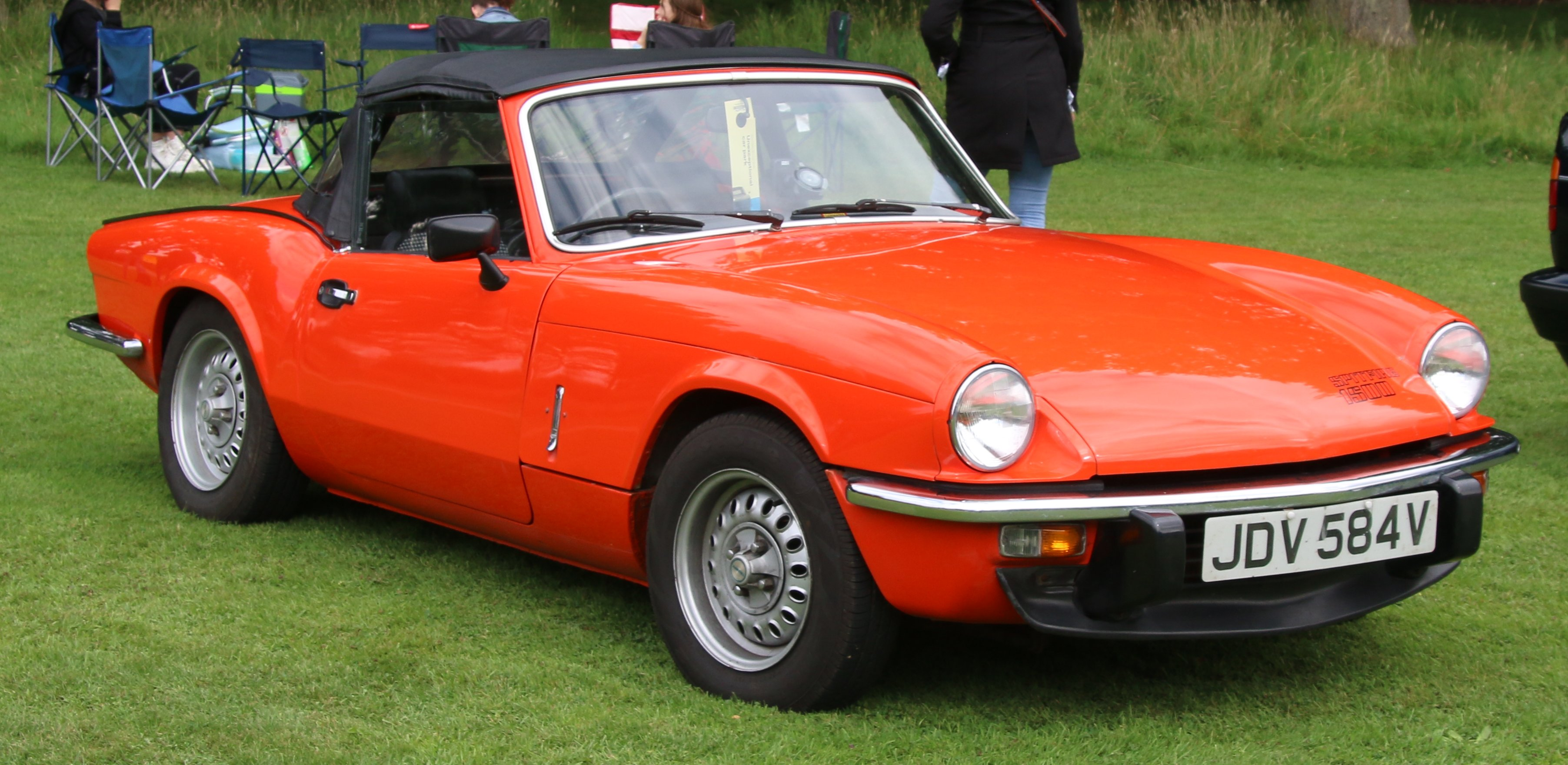

Overview
- Production: 1974–1980; 95,829 made

Powertrain
- Engine: 1,493 cc (91.1 cu in) Standard SC I4
- Transmission: 4-speed manual with optional overdrive on top and third

Dimensions
- Kerb weight: 1,750 lb (790 kg)(unladen U.K.-spec)

In 1973 in the United States and Canada, and 1975 in the rest of the world, the 1500 engine was used on the MK IV body to make the Spitfire 1500. Although in this final incarnation the engine was rather rough and more prone to failure than the earlier units, torque was greatly increased by increasing the cylinder stroke to 87.5 mm (3.44 in), which made it much more drivable in traffic.

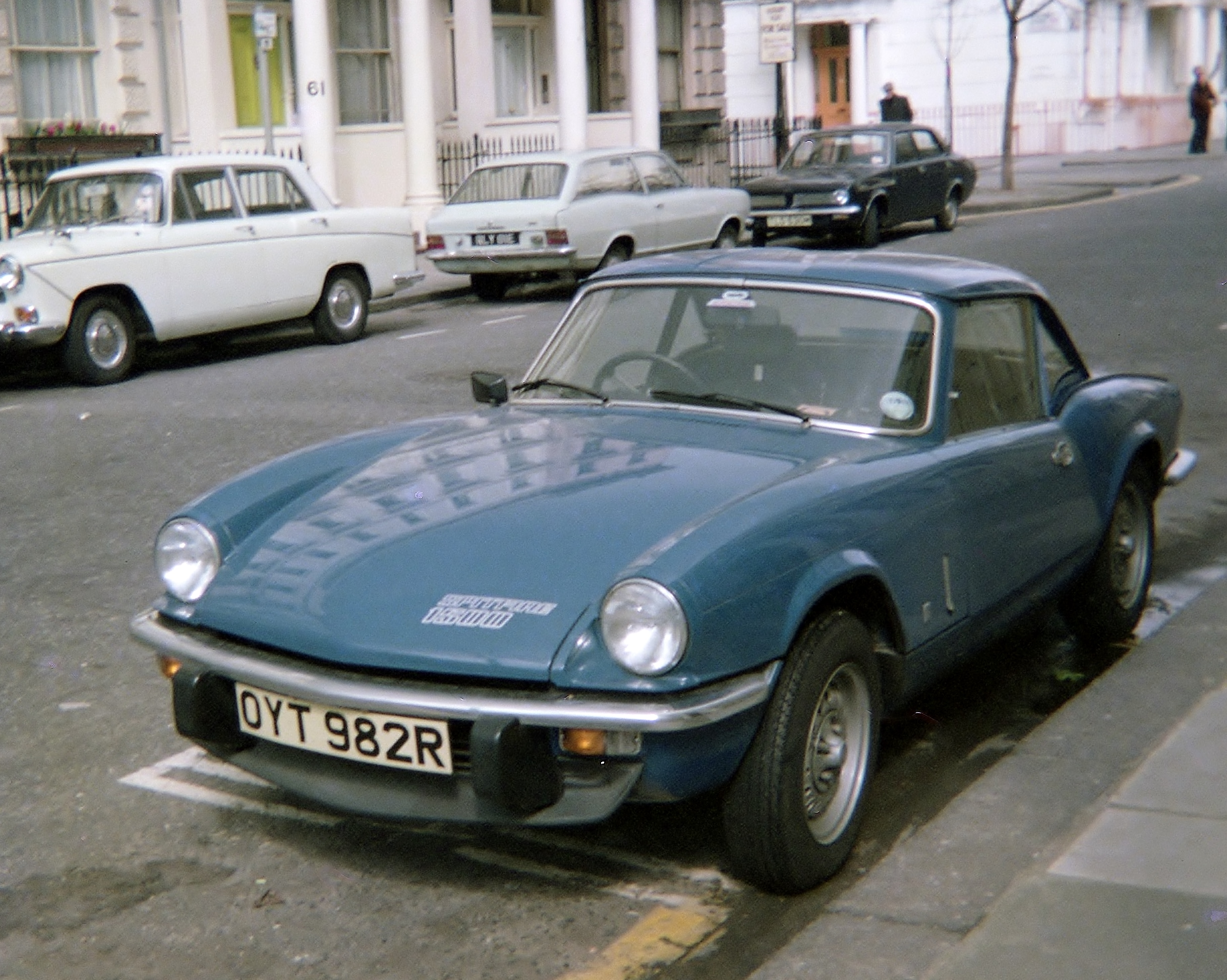
A 1976 Spitfire 1500 photographed in London the following year

While the rest of the world saw 1500s with a compression ratio of 8.0:1, the American market model was fitted with a single Zenith-Stromberg carburettor and a compression ratio reduced to 7.5:1 to allow it to run on lower octane unleaded fuel. With the addition of a catalytic converter and exhaust gas recirculating system, the engine only delivered 53 bhp (40 kW) (DIN) with a slower 0–60 mph time of 16.3 seconds. The notable exception to this was the 1976 model year, where the compression ratio was raised to 9.1:1. This improvement was short-lived, however, as the ratio was again reduced to 7.5:1 for the remaining years of production.

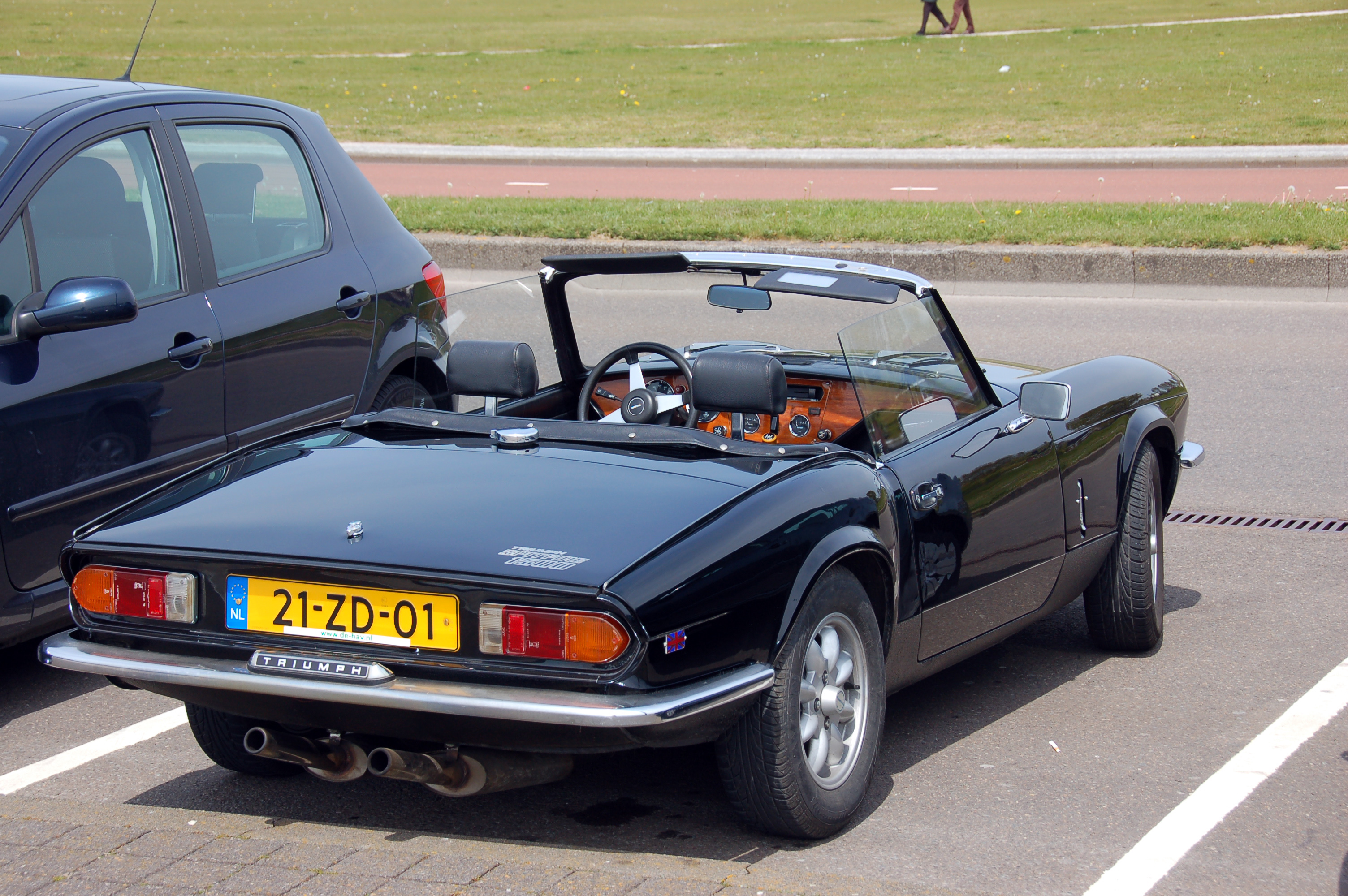
Rear view of a 1978 Spitfire 1500

In the UK the 9:1 compression ratio, less restrictive emissions control equipment, and the Type HS2 SU carburettors now being replaced with larger Type HS4 models, led to the most powerful variant to date. The 1500 Spitfire now produced 71 hp (DIN) at 5,500 rpm, and produced 82 lb⋅ft (111 N⋅m) of torque at 3,000 rpm. Top speed was now at the 100 mph (160 km/h) mark, and 0 to 60 mph (97 km/h) was reached in 13.2 seconds. Fuel economy was reduced to 29mpg.

Further improvements to the suspension followed with the 1500 included longer swing axles and a lowered spring mounting point for more negative camber and a wider rear track. The wider, lower stance gave an impressive skid pad result of 0.87g average. The gearbox gained synchromesh on its bottom gear.

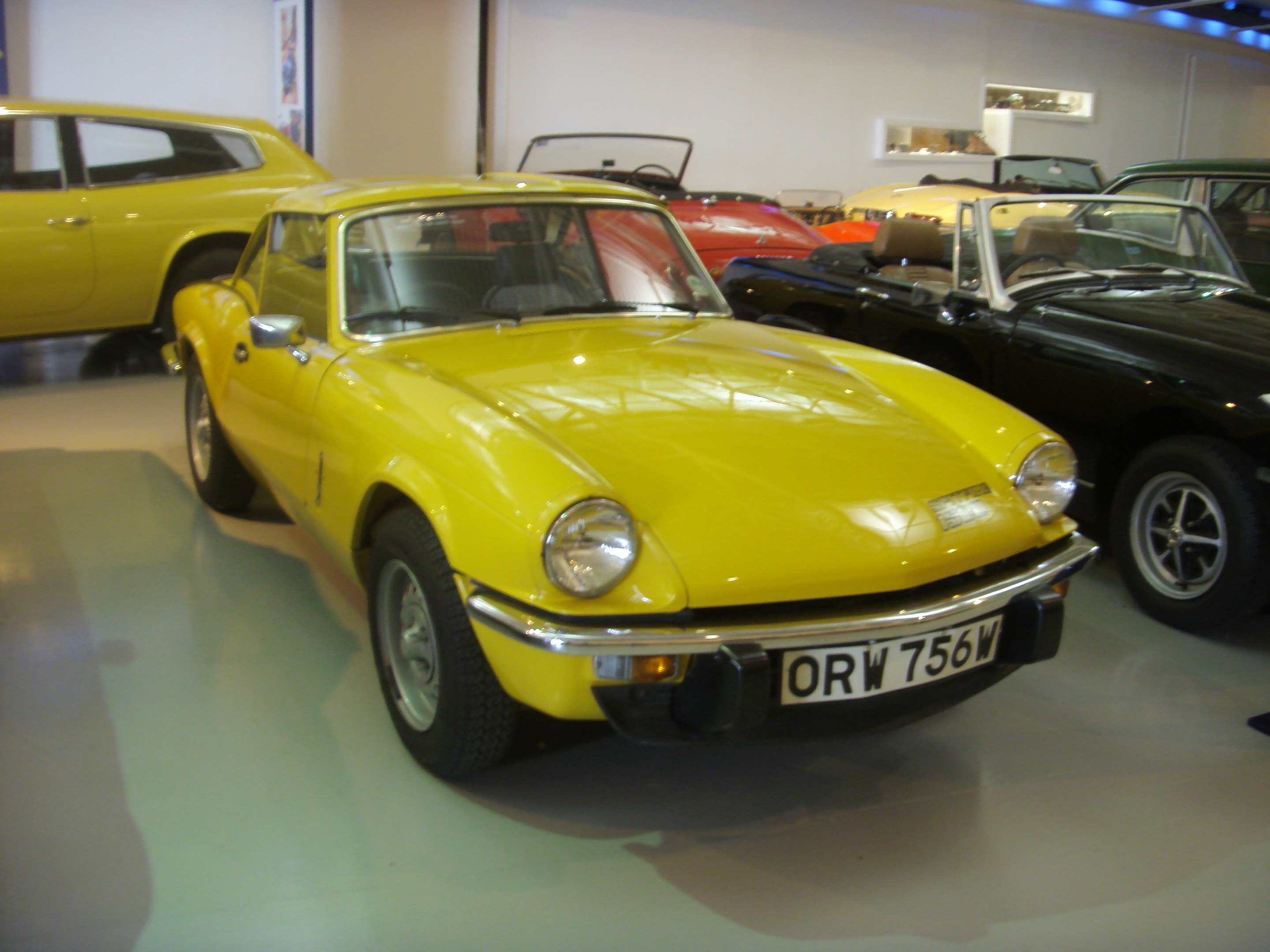
The final Triumph Spitfire to roll off the assembly line is this yellow 1980 hardtop example, pictured here at the British Motor Museum

The American market Spitfire 1500 is identified by large plastic over-riders and wing mounted reflectors on the front and back wings. US specification models up to 1978 featured chrome bumpers, and on the 1979 and 1980 models these were replaced by black rubber bumpers with built-in over-riders, using chassis extensions to support the bumpers.

Detail improvements continued to be made throughout the 1500's production run, including reclining seats with "chequered brushed nylon centre panels" and head restraints, introduced for domestic market cars early in 1977 along with a new set of column stalk operated minor controls (as fitted already in the TR7) replacing the old dashboard mounted knobs and switches. Also added for the model's final years were a wood dash, hazard flashers and an electric screen washer, in place of the previous manual pump operated ones. Options such as the hard top, tonneau cover, map light and overdrive continued to be popular, but wire wheels ceased to be available.

The 1980 model was the last and the heaviest Spitfire, weighing 1,875 lb (850.5 kg). Base prices for the 1980 model year were $7,365 in the US and £3,631 in the UK.

Assembled at Canley in August 1980 shortly before the factory closed, the last Spitfire was an Inca Yellow UK-model including the factory hardtop and overdrive options. Never sold to the public, it remains on display at the British Motor Museum.

== Motorsports ==
Popular in street and rally racing, Spitfires won numerous SCCA National Sports Car Championships in F and G Production classes; won its class at the 1964 Tour de France rally, coming in second overall, and won the 1964 Geneva Rally. In 1965, a Spitfire won its class in the Alpine Rally.
