= Austin-Healey 3000 =

British sports car built from 1959 until 1967

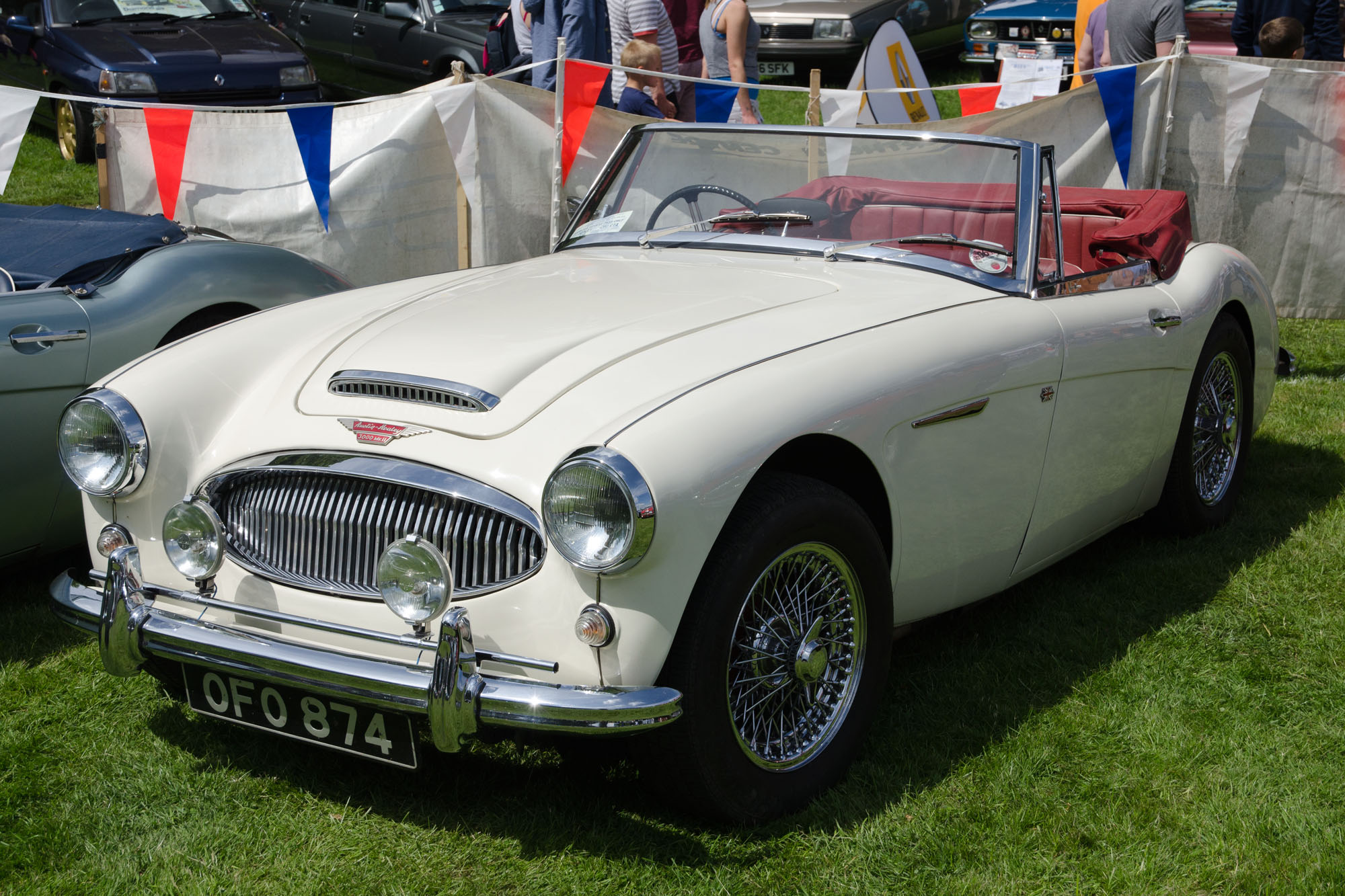
- Austin Healey 3000 sports convertible

Overview
- Manufacturer: Austin-Healey (BMC)
- Production: 1959–1967
- Assembly: United Kingdom: Abingdon, England

Body and chassis
- Class: Sports car
- Body style: 2-door 2 or 2+2 seater roadster then convertible
- Layout: FR layout

Powertrain
- Engine: 2,912 cc (2.9 L) C-Series I6

Dimensions
- Wheelbase: 92 in (2,337 mm); Track 49 in (1,245 mm) (front)
- Length: 157 in (3,988 mm)
- Width: 60 in (1,524 mm)
- Height: 46 in (1,168 mm) (Hood down); 49.5 in (1,257 mm) (hard top)
- Kerb weight: 2,550 lb (1,157 kg)

Chronology
- Predecessor: Austin-Healey 100-6
- Successor: MG MGC

The Austin-Healey 3000 is a British sports car built from 1959 until 1967. It is the best known of the "big Healey" models. The car's bodywork was made by Jensen Motors and the vehicles were assembled at BMC's MG Works in Abingdon, alongside BMC's MG models.

During its production life, the car changed from an open sports car, albeit with a child-transporting 2+2 option, to a sports convertible. In 1963, 91.5 percent of all Austin-Healey 3000 cars were exported; mostly to North America. The 3-litre 3000 was a highly successful car, which won its class in many European rallies in its heyday and is still raced in classic car competitions by enthusiasts today.

British Motor Corporation ended manufacture in 1967, filling its place with a car with a new, though similar, engine in a newer monocoque chassis; the MGB variant named the MGC.

== History ==
=== Mark I ===
==== BN7, BT7 roadsters ====
The Austin-Healey 3000 was announced on 1 July 1959, with a 3-litre BMC C-Series engine to replace the smaller 2.6-litre engine of the 100-6 and disc brakes at the front wheels. The manufacturers claimed it would reach 60 mph in 11 seconds and 100 mph in 31 seconds.

Other changes were minor compared to those between the original 100 and the 100–6. The wheelbase and body were unchanged, as were the body styles, a 2+2 or BT7 and a two-seater BN7.

Weather protection remained minimal, a folding plastic roof on a light demountable frame, and above the doors, detachable side screens holding sliding perspex panels. Wire wheels, overdrive gearbox, laminated windscreen, heater, adjustable steering column, detachable hard top for the 2+2, and two-tone paint were available as options.

13,650 Mark Is were built: 2,825 BN7 open two-seaters, and 10,825 BT7 2+2s

Road test

A BT7 3000 with hardtop and overdrive tested by The Motor magazine in 1960 had a top speed of 115 mph (185 km/h) and could accelerate from 0–60 mph (97 km/h) in 11.7 seconds. A fuel consumption of 21.6 miles per imperial gallon (13.1 L/100 km; 18.0 mpg_{‑US}) was recorded. The test car cost £1326 including taxes.

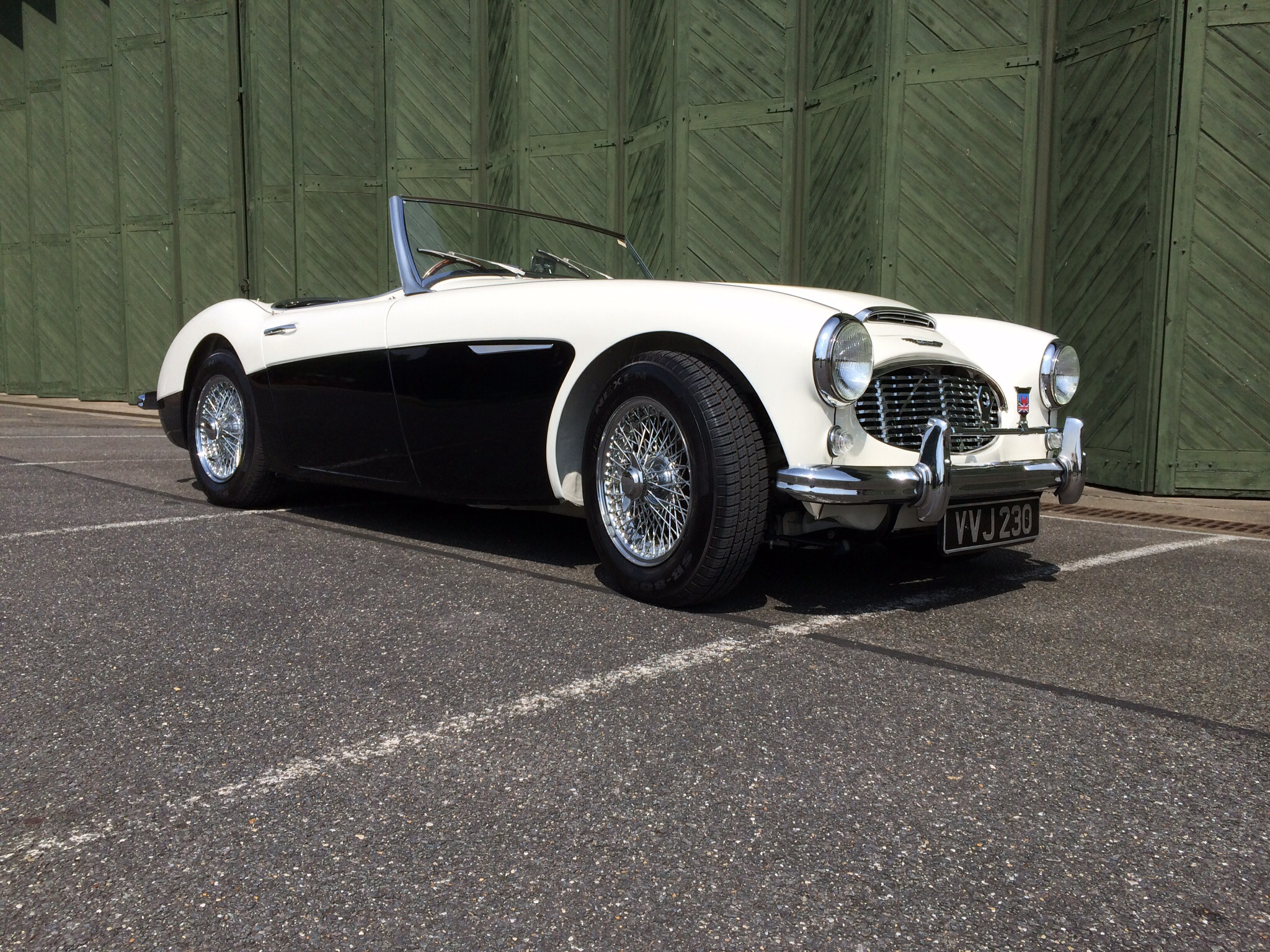
1959 Mark I BN7 open two-seater

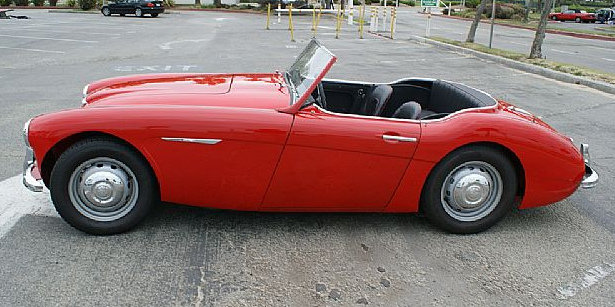
1960 Mark I BT7 open 2+2

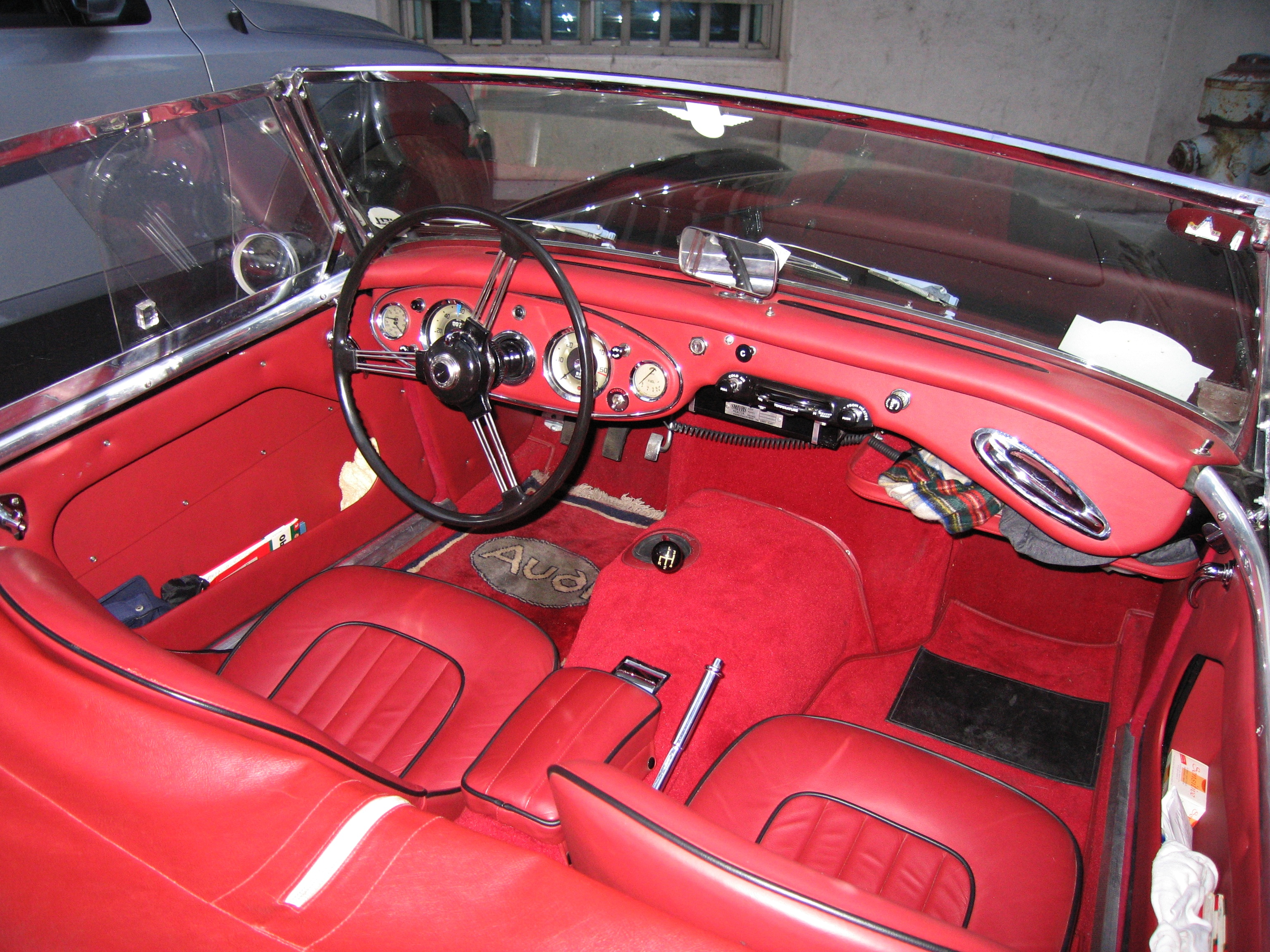
Mk I (or Mk 2) open car showing sidescreen

=== Mark II ===
==== BN7, BT7 roadsters ====
Engines fitted with three SU HS4 carburettors (total area 5.3 sq. inches) and an improved camshaft were announced at the end of May 1961. Other changes included a vertical barred front grille. Optional extras were similar to the Mark I. From August 1961, a brake servo was also available as an optional extra, which greatly improved braking performance. These were the last true Big Healey roadsters; the BN7 Mark II was discontinued in March 1962, and the BT7 Mark II in June 1962

Road test

A 3000 Mark II BT7 (699DON) with hardtop and overdrive tested by the British magazine The Motor in 1961 had a top speed of 112.9 mph (181.7 km/h) and could accelerate from 0–60 mph (97 km/h) in 10.9 seconds. A fuel consumption of 23.5 miles per imperial gallon (12.0 L/100 km; 19.6 mpg_{‑US}) was recorded. The test car cost £1362 including taxes.

==== BJ7 sports convertible ====
The 3000 sports convertible Mark II was launched at the end of August 1962. It was a true convertible with almost saloon car comfort, a new wrap-around windscreen, wind-up side windows, swiveling quarter lights and a quick-action folding roof. Twin SU HS6 carburettors replaced the triple SUs (total area 5.3 sq. inches, a 9.25% reduction). Austin-Healey claimed it could exceed 115 mph.

91.5 per cent of all 1963 Austin Healey 3000 cars were exported, with the majority going to North America.

11,564 Mark IIs were made: 355 BN7 open two-seaters, 5,096 BT7 2+2s, and 6,113 BJ7 2+2 sports convertibles

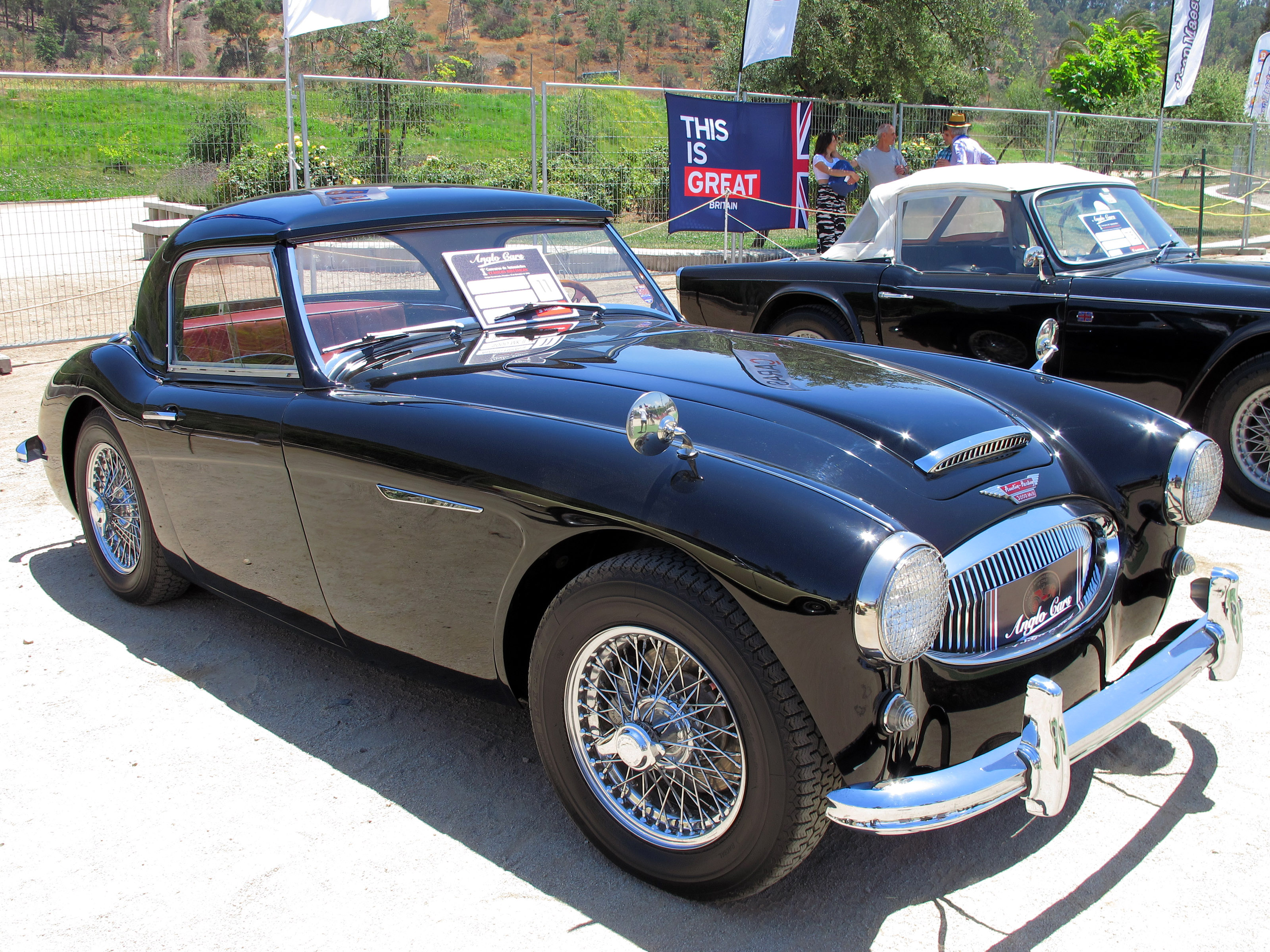
1962 Mark II BT7 open 2+2 showing sidescreens and fitted with optional wire wheels and hardtop

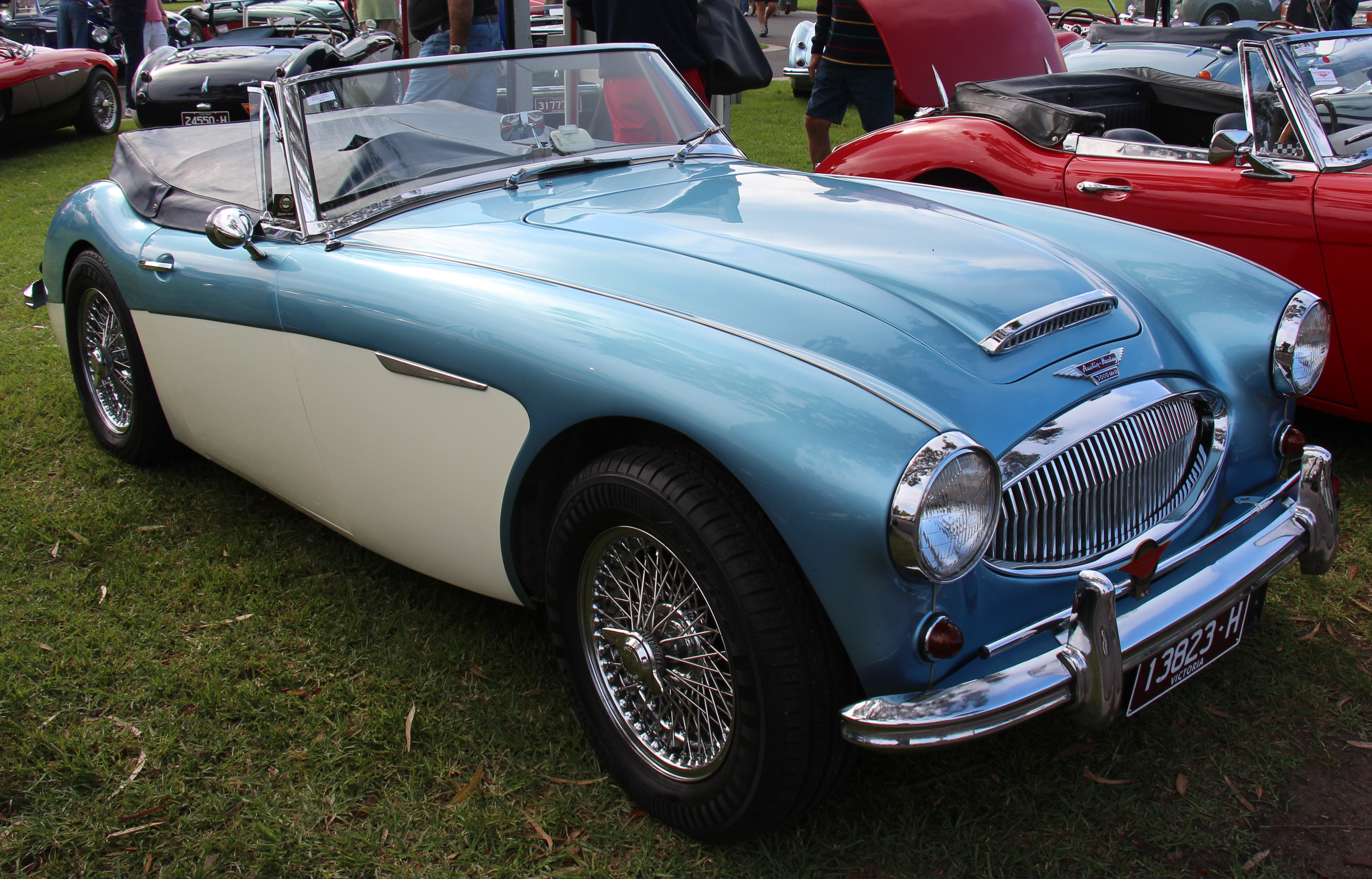
1962 Mark II BJ7 sports convertible

=== Mark III ===
==== BJ8 sports convertible ====
The 3000 sports convertible Mark III was announced in February 1964 with power increased from 136 bhp to 150 bhp by a new higher lift camshaft. SU HD8 carburettors replaced HS6 units increasing the choke size from 1.75 to 2 inches, or total area 6.3 sq. inches, increasing by 30.6%. Power-assisted braking became standard instead of optional. The new car's fascia displayed its speedometer and tachometer directly in front of the driver. Upholstery was now in Ambla vinyl

The Mark III BJ8 remained in production until the end of 1967 when manufacture of the Austin-Healey 3000 ceased.

In May 1964 the Phase II version of the Mark III was released, which gained ground clearance through a modified rear chassis. In March 1965 the car received separate indicator lights.

17,712 Mark IIIs were manufactured.

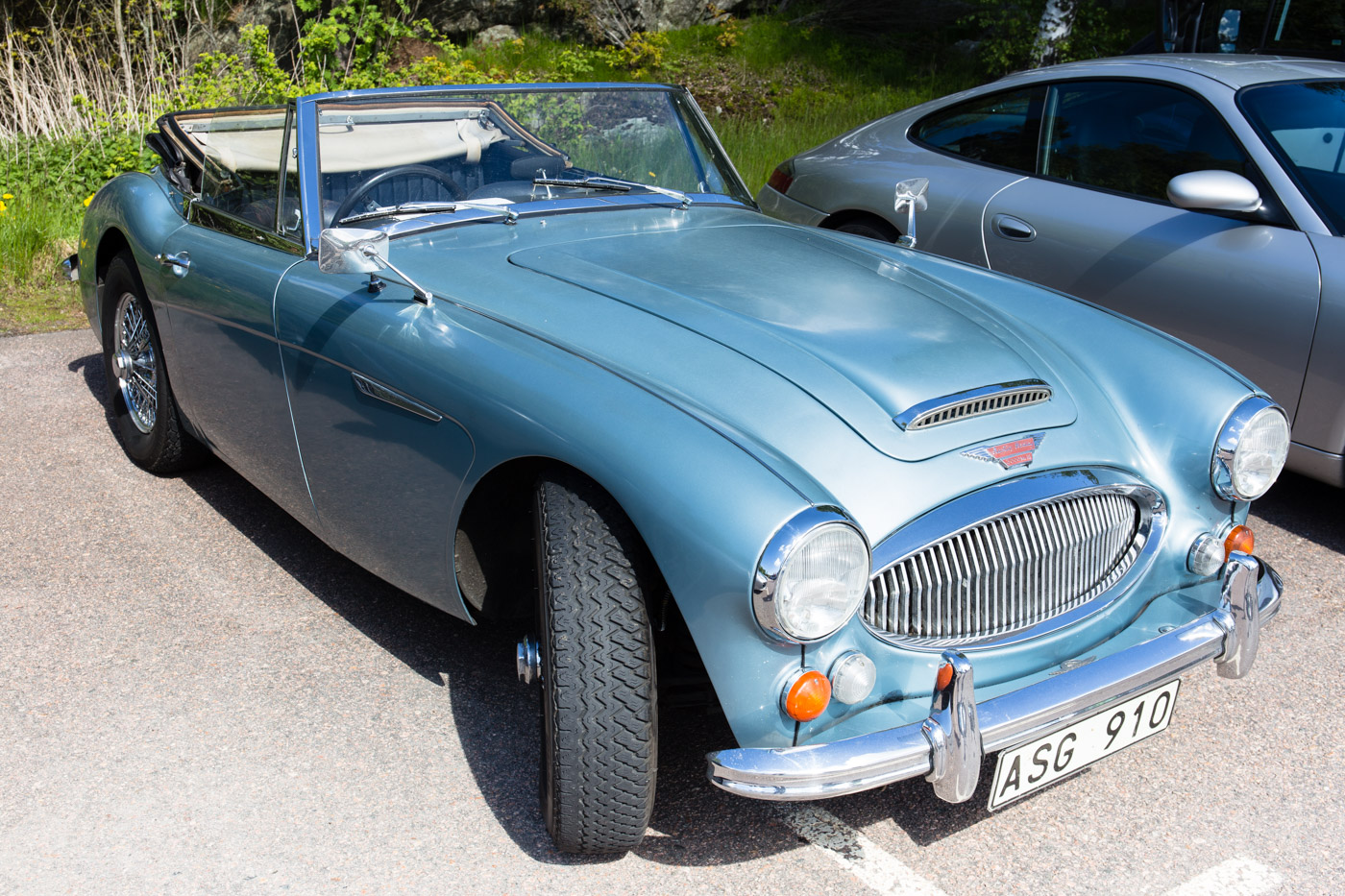
1968 Mark III BJ8 sports convertible

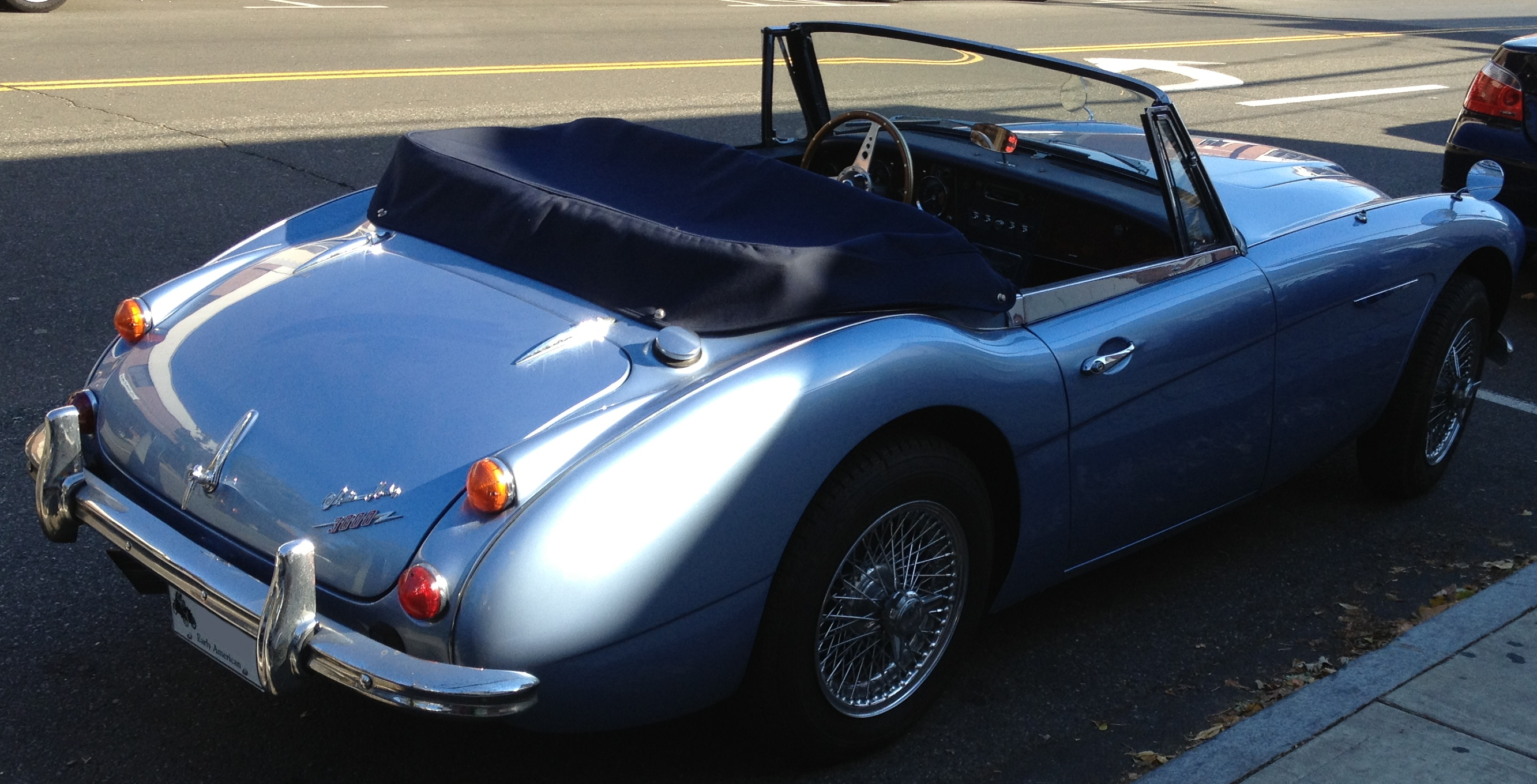
The rear of an Austin Healey 3000 Mk III BJ8

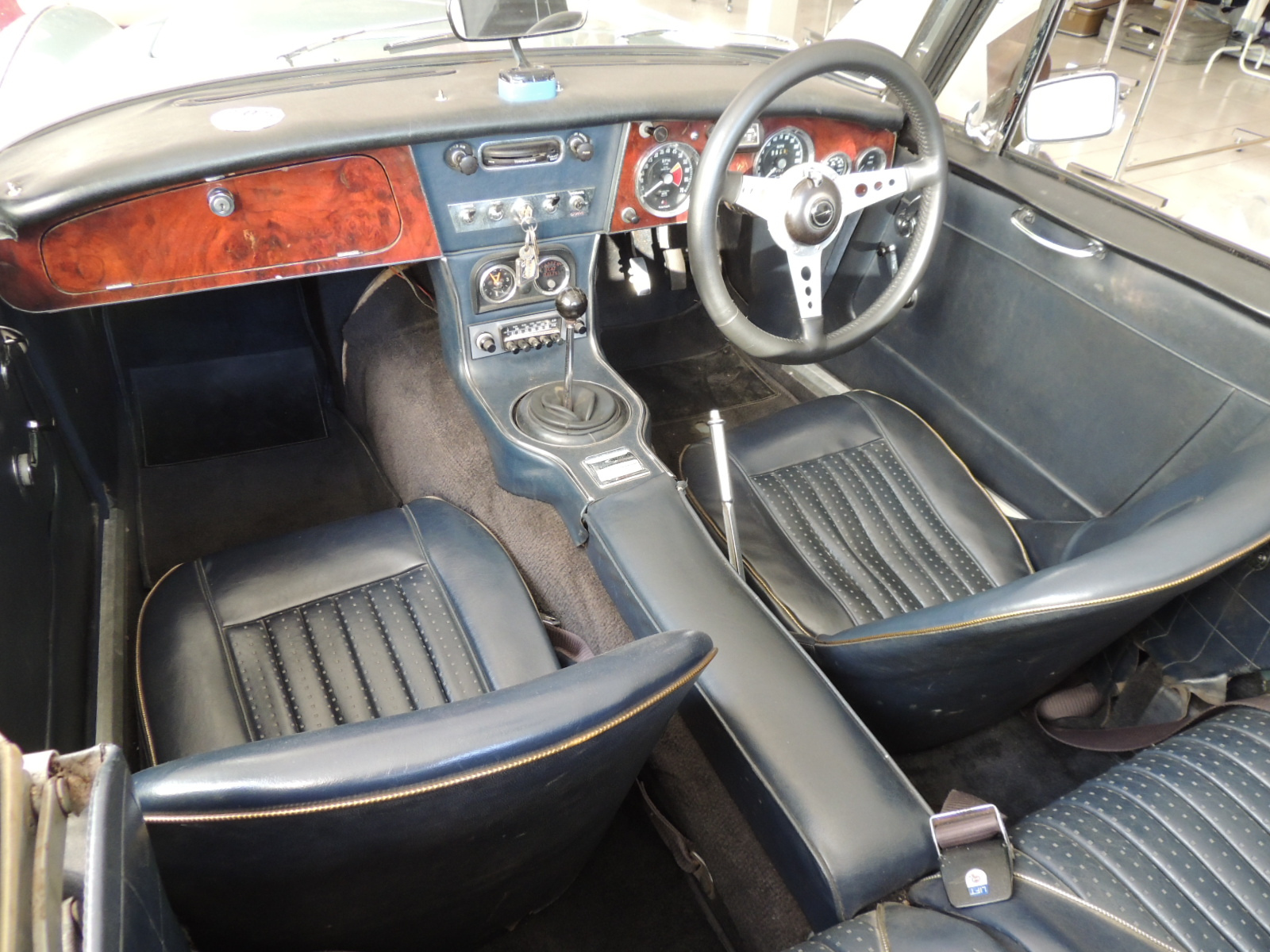
Mk III dashboard and interior

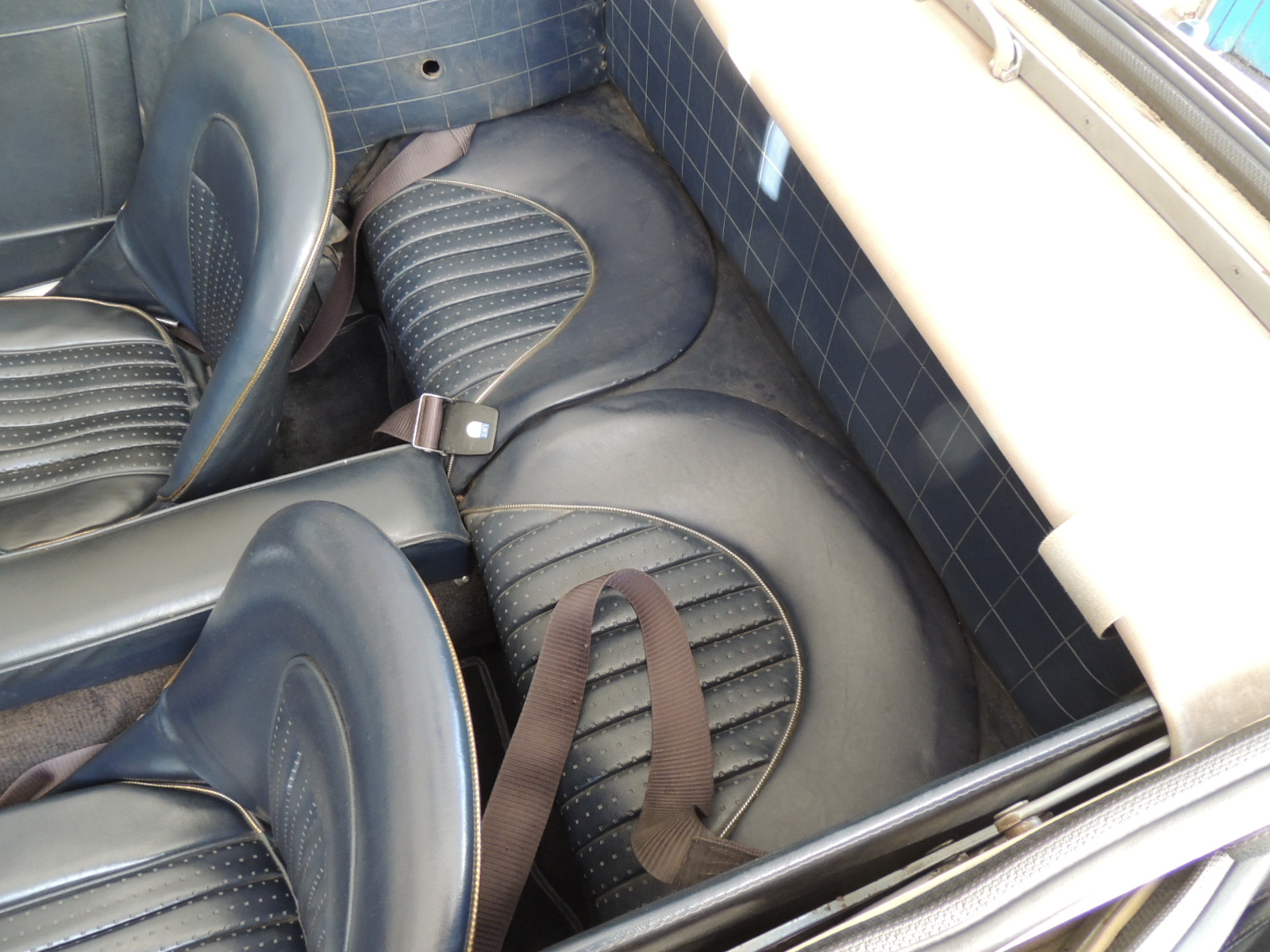
2+2 seating in the rear of a Mk III

=== Mark IV ===
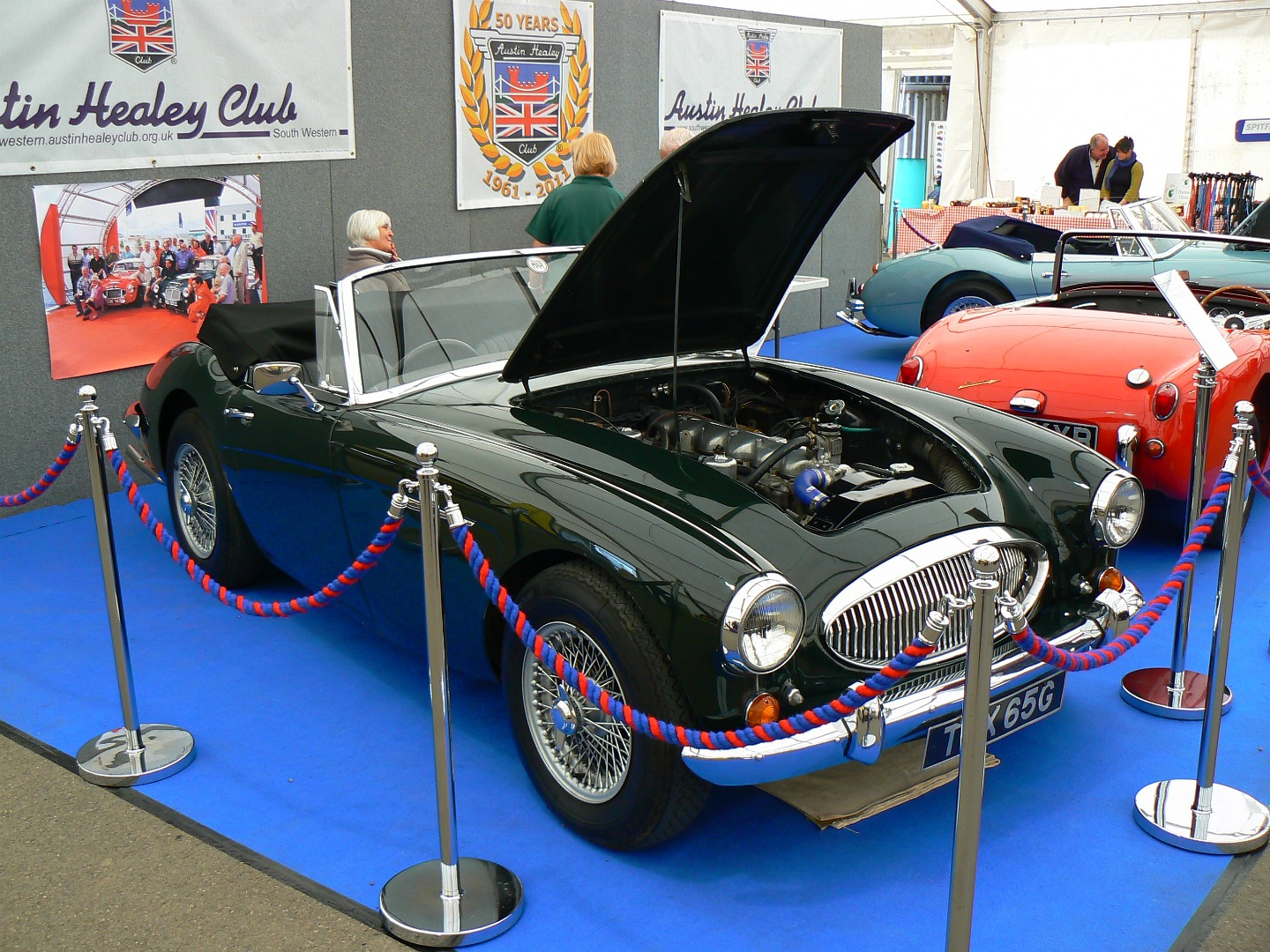
TNX65G, one of three Mark IVs built

As the life of the 3000 was drawing near, Healey considered various updates to help the car remain saleable while also meeting stricter emissions and safety regulations. Closest to reaching production was the 4000 Mark IV, of which three examples were finished in 1966 and 1967. Two were automatics and one was fitted with the four-speed manual transmission from the Jaguar E-type. The bodywork was 6 inches (150 mm) wider, the interior altered and made more spacious due to the extra width, but the main change was the aluminium 3.9-litre Rolls-Royce engine – the same unit which was fitted to the Vanden Plas 4-litre R.

=== Pininfarina grand tourer ===
Pininfarina exhibited the 3000 as a closed roof grand tourer, designed by Pio Manzù, at the October 1962 Earls Court Show. It was the winning design from a competition by Swiss motoring publication Auto-Jahr.

=== In racing ===
Austin Healey 3000s have a long competition history, and raced at most major racing circuits around the world, including Sebring (USA), Le Mans (France), and Mount Panorama Circuit, Bathurst (Australia). The BMC competitions department rallied the 3000 from its introduction, but the development of the works cars effectively ended in 1965, mainly because of the success of the Mini Cooper 'S'.

The most successful Austin-Healey 3000s include 54 FAC and 56 FAC (which finished 12th and 25th at the 12 Hours of Sebring in 1963), DD300 (which competed in the 1961 24 Hours of Le Mans), and 727 URX (which finished 1st in the Liège–Rome–Liège Rally).
