= 1969 SCCA Continental Championship =

Seasons
- ← 1968 1970 →

The 1969 SCCA Continental Championship was the third annual running of the Sports Car Club of America's professional open wheel racing series. It was the first to carry the SCCA Continental Championship name as the previous two series had both been staged as the Grand Prix Championship.

The 1969 championship was open only to Formula A cars. Formula B and Formula C cars, which had competed with the Formula A cars in the previous two championships, were now given their own races at each event and competed for separate points.

== Race results ==
The 1969 SCCA Continental Championship was contested over thirteen events.

Round	Date	Event name	Event location	Race distance	Winning driver	Winning car
1	April 20	Riverside Grand Prix	Riverside International Raceway	45 laps	(Canada) John Cannon	Eagle Mk 5 - Chevrolet V8
2	May 4	Monterey Grand Prix	Laguna Seca Raceway	53 laps	(United States) Sam Posey	Eagle Mk 5 - Chevrolet V8
3	June 8	Colorado Grand Prix	Continental Divide Raceway	29 laps	(United States) Dick Simon	Lola T142 - Chevrolet V8
4	June 22	Continental 49'er	Sears Point International Raceway	49 laps	(Canada) John Cannon	Eagle Mk 5 - Chevrolet V8
5	July 6	Seattle Grand Prix	Seattle International Raceway	50 laps	(United States) Tony Adamowicz	Eagle Mk 5 - Chevrolet V8
6	July 20	Badger 200	Road America	75 laps	(United States) Tony Adamowicz	Eagle Mk 5 - Chevrolet V8
7	August 2	Schaefer Grand Prix	Lime Rock Park	70 laps	(United Kingdom) Peter Gethin	McLaren M10A - Chevrolet V8
8	August 10	Minnesota Grand Prix	Brainerd International Raceway	69 laps	(United Kingdom) David Hobbs	Surtees TS5 - Chevrolet V8
9	August 23	Mosport Continental	Mosport Park	42 laps	(Canada) John Cannon	Eagle Mk 5 - Chevrolet V8
10	September 1	Lime Rock Grand Prix	Lime Rock Park	70 laps	(United States) Sam Posey	McLaren M10A - Chevrolet V8
11	September 7	Le Circuit Continental	Circuit Mont-Tremblant	21 laps	(United Kingdom) David Hobbs	Surtees TS5 - Chevrolet V8
12	September 21	Thompson Grand Prix	Thompson Speedway	65 laps	(United Kingdom) David Hobbs	Surtees TS5 - Chevrolet V8
13	December 28	L&M F5000 Championship Race	Sebring International Raceway	90 laps	(United Kingdom) David Hobbs	Surtees TS5 - Chevrolet V8

== Points system ==
Championship points were awarded to drivers on a 9-6-4-3-2-1 basis for the first six places in each race.

== Championship results ==
Position	Driver	Car	Points
1	(United States) Tony Adamowicz	Eagle Chevrolet	47
2	(United Kingdom) David Hobbs	Surtees TS5 Chevrolet	46
3	(United States) Sam Posey	Eagle Chevrolet; McLaren M10A Chevrolet	41
4	(United States) George Wintersteen	Lola T142 Chevrolet	31
5	(Canada) John Cannon	Eagle Chevrolet	31
6	(United Kingdom) Bob Brown	Eagle Chevrolet	16
7	(United States) Bud Morley	Lola T142 Chevrolet	15
8	(United States) Dick Simon	Lola T142 Chevrolet	11
9	(Italy) Andrea de Adamich	Surtees TS5 Chevrolet	10
10	(United Kingdom) Peter Gethin	McLaren M10A Chevrolet	9
11	(United States) Lothar Motschenbacher	McLaren M10A Chevrolet	7
=	(United States) Chuck Dietrich	Lola T142 Chevrolet	7
=	(United States) Jerry Hansen	McLaren M10A Chevrolet; Eagle Chevrolet	7
14	(Canada) John Cordts	McLaren M10A Chevrolet	6
=	(United States) Gus Hutchison	Brabham BT26 Ford Cosworth DFV	6
16	(Canada) George Eaton	McLaren M10A Chevrolet	5
=	(Canada) Horst Kroll	Lola T142 Chevrolet	5
18	(United States) Mike Goth	Surtees TS5 Chevrolet	4
=	(United States) John Gunn	Lola T142 Chevrolet	4
20	(United States) Mike Hiss	Lola T140 Chevrolet	3
=	(Canada) Eppie Wietzes	Lola T142 Chevrolet	3
22	(United States) Sherwood Johnston	Lola T142 Chevrolet	2
=	(United States) John Mahler	Lola T142 Chevrolet	2
=	(United States) Alan Bouverat	McLaren M10A Chevrolet	2
25	(United States) Pete Lovely	Lotus 49B Ford Cosworth DFV	1
=	(United States) Kurt Reinold	McKee Mk12 Chevrolet	1
=	(United States) Mike Brockman	Lola T142 Chevrolet	1
