= 1967 Can-Am season =

North American auto racing season

Seasons
- ← 1966 1968 →

The 1967 Canadian-American Challenge Cup was the second season of the Can-Am auto racing series. It involved FIA Group 7 racing cars running two-hour sprint events. It began September 3, 1967, and ended November 12, 1967, after six rounds.

The series was won by Bruce McLaren driving a McLaren M6A Chevrolet.

== Schedule ==
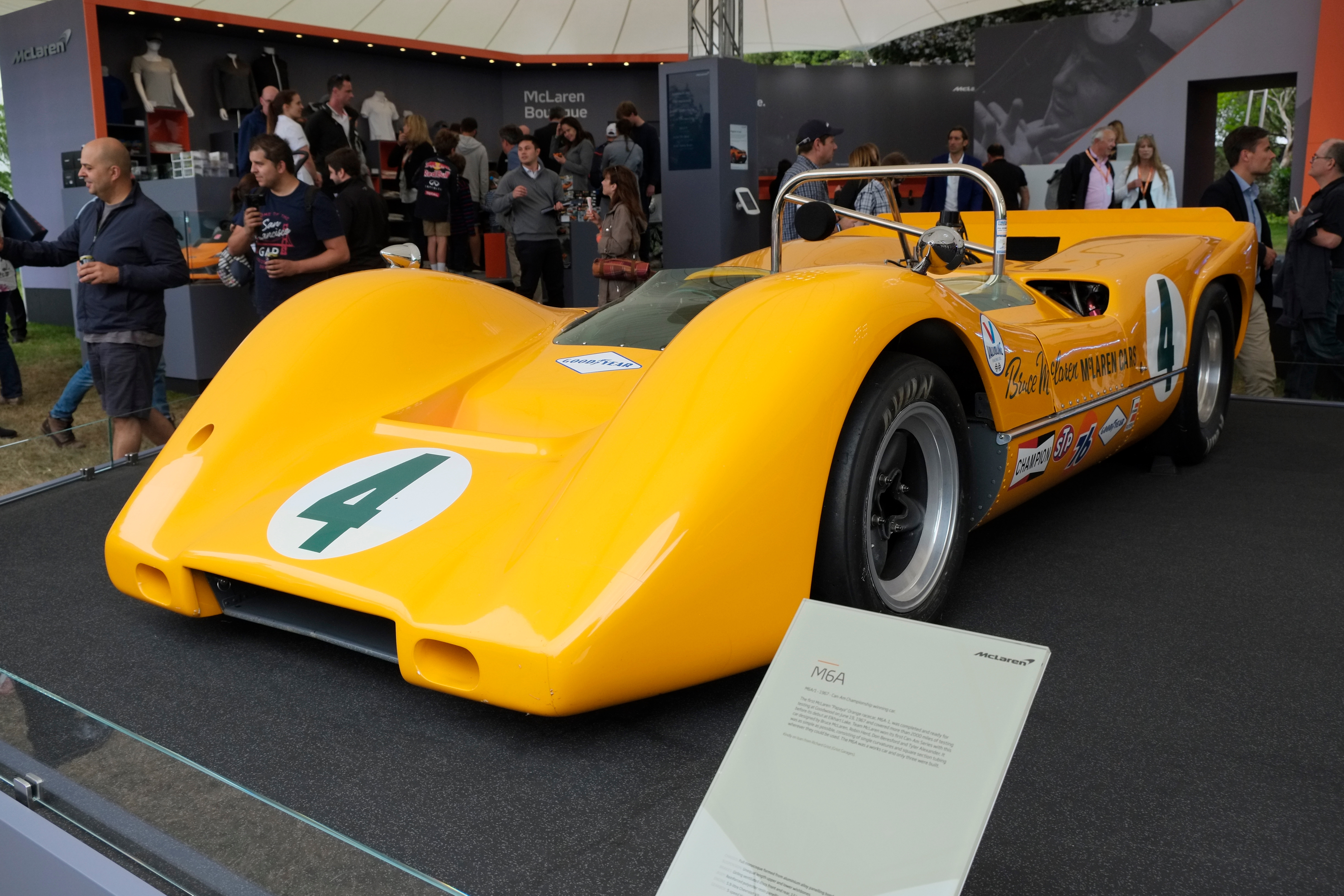
The series was won by Bruce McLaren driving a McLaren M6A Chevrolet. The car is pictured in 2017

Rnd	Race	Circuit	Date
1	Road America Can-Am	Road America	September 3
2	Chevron Grand Prix	Bridgehampton Race Circuit	September 17
3	Player's 200	Mosport Park	September 23
4	Monterey Grand Prix	Laguna Seca Raceway	October 15
5	Los Angeles Times Grand Prix	Riverside International Raceway	October 29
6	Stardust Grand Prix	Stardust International Raceway	November 12

== Entries ==
Team	Chassis	Engine	Tire	Number	Drivers	Rounds
(United States) Autodynamics Corporation	Caldwell D-7	Chevrolet 6.0 L V8	G	1	(United States) Sam Posey	All
(United States) Autodynamics Corporation	McLaren-Elva Mk. II	Chevrolet 6.0 L V8	G	2	(United States) Brett Lunger	1–4
(United Kingdom) McLaren Cars, Ltd.	McLaren M6A	Chevrolet 5.9 L V8	G	4	(New Zealand) Bruce McLaren	All
(United Kingdom) McLaren Cars, Ltd.	McLaren M6A	Chevrolet 5.9 L V8	G	5	(New Zealand) Denny Hulme	All
(United States) Roger Penske Racing Enterprises	Lola T70 Mk. 3B	Chevrolet 7.0 L V8	F	6	(United States) Mark Donohue	All
(United States) Roger Penske Racing Enterprises	Lola T70 Mk. 2 Lola T70 Mk. 3	Chevrolet 5.7 L V8	F	16	(United States) George Follmer	All
(United Kingdom) Team Surtees, Ltd.	Lola T70 Mk. 3B; Lola T70 Mk. 2	Chevrolet 5.7 L V8; Chevrolet 6.0 L V8	F	7/8	(United Kingdom) John Surtees	All
(Germany) Lothar Motschenbacher	McLaren-Elva Mk. II	Chevrolet 6.0 L V8	G	9/38	(United States) Ron Herrera	5–6
(United States) Jack Nethercutt	Mirage Mk. IB	Chevrolet 6.0 L V8		10	(United States) Scooter Patrick	2–5
(United States) Peyton A. Cramer, Dana Chevrolet	Lola T70 Mk. 3	Chevrolet 5.9 L V8	G	11	(Germany) Lothar Motschenbacher	All
(United States) Peyton A. Cramer, Dana Chevrolet	Lola T70 Mk. 3	Chevrolet 5.9 L V8	G	52	(United States) Peter Revson	All
(United States) Pacesetter Homes	Lola T70 Mk. 2	Chevrolet 6.0 L V8	G	12	(United States) Roger McCluskey	All
(United States) Morley Racing	McLaren-Elva Mk. II; Lola T70 Mk. 3	Chevrolet 6.0 L V8	G	13/14	(United States) Bud Morley	1–2, 4–6
(United States) Skip Barber	McLaren-Elva Mk. II	Chevrolet 6.0 L V8	F	14	(United States) Skip Barber	1–3
(United States) Entin Brothers Racing	McLaren-Elva Mk. II	Chevrolet 6.0 L V8		15/45	(United States) Jerry Entin	1, 4–6
(United States) Holmon & Moody, Inc./Paul Newman	Holmon & Moody Honker II	Ford 5.7 L V8; Ford 6.1 L V8	F	17	(United States) Mario Andretti	1–3, 5–6
(United States) Merle Brennan Auto	Genie Mk. X	Chevrolet 5.4 L V8	G	17	(United States) Merle Brennan	4
(Canada) Veedol Racing Team	Chinook Mk. I	Chevrolet 5.2 L V8		18	(Canada) Nat Adams	3
(United States) Gary M. Wilson	McLaren-Elva Mk. II	Chevrolet 5.9 L V8		19/59	(United States) Gary Wilson	1, 6
(United States) Dick Niles Mercury	McLaren-Elva Mk. III	Chevrolet 6.0 L V8	F	19	(United States) Bill Amick	4–5
(United States) Smothers Brothers Racing Team	Lola T70 Mk. 1	Chevrolet 5.6 L V8	G	21/24	(United States) Hugh Powell	1–2, 4–6
(United States) Ralph Salyer & Smothers Brothers Racing Team	McKee Mk. 7	Oldsmobile 6.7 L V8	G	25	(United States) Charlie Hayes	All
(United States) American Rubber & Plastic Company	Lola T70 Mk. 3	Ford 5.0 L V8	F	21	(United States) Parnelli Jones	4–6
(Canada) Ecurie Soucy Racing Team	McLaren-Elva Mk. IIB	Chevrolet 6.0 L V8	G	22	(United Kingdom) Mike Spence	2–6
(United States) Harrah's Club	Ferrari 330 P4	Ferrari 4.2 L V12	F	23	(New Zealand) Chris Amon	4–6
(United States) Harrah's Club	Ferrari 350 P4	Ferrari 4.2 L V12	F	27	(United Kingdom) Jonathan Williams	4–6
(United States) North American Racing Team	Ferrari 412 P Spyder	Ferrari 4.0 L V12	G	32	(Italy) Ludovico Scarfiotti	2–3
(United States) Robert J. Nagel	McKee Mk. 7	Chevrolet 5.5 L V8		24	(United States) Bob Nagel	1–2
(United States) Carl Haas Automobile Imports, Inc.	McLaren-Elva Mk. III	Chevrolet 5.9 L V8	G	26	(United States) Chuck Parsons	All
(United States) Alderman Automotive Service, Inc.	McLaren-Elva Mk. II	Chevrolet V8	F	27	(United States) George Alderman	2
(United States) Ecurie Greene, Inc.	McLaren-Elva Mk. II	Ford 5.3 L V8		28	(United States) Dick Smith	1–3
(United States) James Paul	McLaren-Elva Mk. IIIB	Chevrolet 5.5 L V8	G	29	(United States) Jim Paul	5–6
(United States) Marshall B. Doran	McLaren-Elva Mk. II	Chevrolet 5.9 L V8	G	31	(United States) Brooke Doran	1
(Canada) Huw Morgan/Team Cannon (Canada) Tero-Corvette/Roy Kumnick	McLaren-Elva Mk. IIB	Chevrolet 5.6 L V8; Chevrolet 5.9 L V8	F	33	(Canada) John Cannon	1, 3–6
(Canada) Huw Morgan/Team Cannon (Canada) Tero-Corvette/Roy Kumnick	Hamill SR3	Chevrolet 5.6 L V8; Chevrolet 5.9 L V8	F	62	(United States) Roy Kumnick	5
(United States) All American Racers	Lola T70 Mk. 3B	Ford-Weslake 6.2 L V8	G	36	(United States) Dan Gurney	All
(United States) Donald J. Morin	McLaren-Elva Mk. III	Chevrolet 5.9 L V8	F	37	(United States) Don Morin	All
(Canada) Heimrath Racing	McLaren-Elva Mk. IIB	Chevrolet 5.2 L V8	F	37	(Canada) Ludwig Heimrath	1–3
(United States) Hollywood Sports Cars	McLaren-Elva Mk. II	Chevrolet 5.7 L V8	F	39	(United States) Jim Adams	4–5
(United States) Ronald K. Courtney	McLaren-Elva Mk. II	Chevrolet 5.5 L V8		41	(United States) Ron Courtney	1, 3
(United States) Jerry Hansen	McLaren-Elva Mk. III	Chevrolet 5.9 L V8	G	44	(United States) Jerry Hansen	1
(United States) JAP Enterprises	Lola T70 Mk. 3	Chevrolet 5.9 L V8		46	(United States) Rick Muther	5–6
(United States) Bill Leonheart	Leonheart Special	Chevrolet V8		47	(United States) Bill Leonheart	1
(United States) Miles Gupton	Platypus	Oldsmobile 3.4 L V8	F	49	(United States) Miles Gupton	4, 6
(United States) Dave Causey	McLaren-Elva Mk. IIB	Chevrolet 6.0 L V8		54	(United States) Dave Causey	3
(United States) Shelby Racing Co., Ltd.	Shelby King Cobra	Ford 6.2 L V8	G	55	(United States) Jerry Titus	5–6
(Canada) David G. Billes	McLaren-Elva Mk. III	Chevrolet 6.4 L V8	F	57	(Canada) John Cordts	1–3
(United States) Chaparral Cars	Chaparral 2G	Chevrolet 7.0 L V8	F	66	(United States) Jim Hall	1–2, 4–6
(United States) Tom Tobin	Brabham BT8	Oldsmobile V8		67	(United States) Tom Tobin	4
(United States) Webster Racing Enterprises	Lola T70 Mk. 3	Chevrolet 6.0 L V8	F	75	(United States) Tony Settember	4–5
(United States) Webster Racing Enterprises	Lola T70 Mk. 3	Chevrolet 6.0 L V8	F	76	(United States) Bill Eve	1–5
(United States) Webster Racing Enterprises	Matich SR3	Repco-Brabham 4.4 L V8; Oldsmobile 4.2 L V8	F	77	(United States) Tony Settember	4–6
(United States) Friedkin Enterprises	Lola T70 Mk. 2	Chevrolet 7.0 L V8	G	78	(United States) Jerry Grant	1–2, 4–6
(United States) Greenville Racing	Lola T70 Mk. II; Lola T70 Mk. 3	Chevrolet 6.0 L V8	F	79/43	(New Zealand) Ross Greenville	1–2, 4–6
(United States) Dan Blocker/Bill Campbell	Genie Mk. X	Chevrolet 6.1 L V8	G	79	(United States) Doug Hooper	5
(United States) Jay C. Hills	McLaren-Elva Mk. II	Chevrolet 6.0 L V8		81	(United States) Jay Hills	5
(Australia) Frank Matich Pty. Ltd.	Matich SR3	Repco-Brabham 4.4 L V8	F	87/15	(Australia) Frank Matich	1–2, 4–5
(United States) Ecurie Vickie Racing	Lotus 19G	Ford 5.4 L V8	G	89	(United States) Bobby Unser	4
(United States) Ecurie Vickie Racing	Lotus 19G	Ford 5.4 L V8	G	89	(United States) Bill Eve	6
(United Kingdom) Drummond Racing Organisation	McLaren-Elva Mk. III	Chevrolet 5.9 L V8	G	91	(United States) Skip Scott	All
(Canada) Comstock Racing	Ford GT40	Ford 4.7 L V8	F	94	(Canada) Eppie Wietzes	3
(United States) Fred Pipin	McKee Mk. 6	Chevrolet 5.5 L V8		97	(United States) Fred Pipin	1, 3
(Canada) George Eaton	McLaren-Elva Mk. III	Ford 4.7 L V8		98	(Canada) George Eaton	3

== Season results ==
Rnd	Circuit	Winning team	Results
Rnd	Circuit	Winning driver	Results
Rnd	Circuit	Winning car	Results
1	Road America	(United Kingdom) #5 Bruce McLaren Motor Racing	Results
1	Road America	(New Zealand) Denny Hulme	Results
1	Road America	McLaren M6A-Chevrolet	Results
2	Bridgehampton	(United Kingdom) #5 Bruce McLaren Motor Racing	Results
2	Bridgehampton	(New Zealand) Denny Hulme	Results
2	Bridgehampton	McLaren M6A-Chevrolet	Results
3	Mosport	(United Kingdom) #5 Bruce McLaren Motor Racing	Results
3	Mosport	(New Zealand) Denny Hulme	Results
3	Mosport	McLaren M6A-Chevrolet	Results
4	Laguna Seca	(United Kingdom) #4 Bruce McLaren Motor Racing	Results
4	Laguna Seca	(New Zealand) Bruce McLaren	Results
4	Laguna Seca	McLaren M6A-Chevrolet	Results
5	Riverside	(United Kingdom) #4 Bruce McLaren Motor Racing	Results
5	Riverside	(New Zealand) Bruce McLaren	Results
5	Riverside	McLaren M6A-Chevrolet	Results
6	Stardust	(United Kingdom) #7 Team Surtees	Results
6	Stardust	(United Kingdom) John Surtees	Results
6	Stardust	Lola T70 Mk.2-Chevrolet	Results

== Drivers Championship ==
Points are awarded to the top six finishers in each race in the order of 9-6-4-3-2-1.

Pos	Driver	Team	Car	Engine	Rd 1	Rd 2	Rd 3	Rd 4	Rd 5	Rd 6	Total
1	(New Zealand) Bruce McLaren	(United Kingdom) Bruce McLaren Motor Racing	McLaren M6A	Chevrolet	Ret	2	2	1	1	Ret	30
2	(New Zealand) Denny Hulme	(United Kingdom) Bruce McLaren Motor Racing	McLaren M6A	Chevrolet	1	1	1	Ret	DSQ	Ret	27
3	(United Kingdom) John Surtees	(United Kingdom) Team Surtees	Lola T70 Mk.3B/Mk.2	Chevrolet	3	4	Ret	Ret	Ret	1	16
4	(United States) Mark Donohue	(United States) Roger Penske Racing	Lola T70 Mk.3B	Chevrolet	2	Ret	Ret	Ret	3	2	16
5	(United States) Jim Hall	(United States) Chaparral Cars Inc.	Chaparral 2G	Chevrolet	4	Ret		2	2	Ret	15
6	(United Kingdom) Mike Spence	(United Kingdom) Ecurie Soucy Racing	McLaren M1B	Chevrolet		Ret	3	Ret	5	3	10
7	(United States) George Follmer	(United States) Roger Penske Racing	Lola T70 Mk.3B	Chevrolet	18	3	6	3	6	Ret	10
8	(United States) Bud Morley	(United States) Bud Morley	McLaren-Elva Mk.II; Lola T70 Mk.3B	Chevrolet	8	Ret		4	Ret	5	5
9=	(United States) Peter Revson	(United States) Dana Chevrolet Racing	Lola T70 Mk.3/Mk.3B	Chevrolet	Ret	Ret	4	Ret	Ret	DSQ	3
9=	(United States) Parnelli Jones	(United States) George Bignotti	Lola T70 Mk.3	Ford				Ret	4	Ret	3
9=	(United States) Charlie Hayes	(United States) Ralph Salyer	McKee Mk.7	Chevrolet; Oldsmobile	10	Ret	DNS	Ret	7	4	3
12=	(United States) Skip Scott	(United States) Drummond Racing	McLaren M1C	Chevrolet	5	Ret	7	Ret	14	Ret	2
12=	(Germany) Lothar Motschenbacher	(United States) Dana Chevrolet Racing	Lola T70 Mk.3	Chevrolet	9	5	9	Ret	15	Ret	2
12=	(New Zealand) Chris Amon	(United States) North American Racing Team	Ferrari 330 P4	Ferrari				5	8	Ret	2
15=	(United States) Jerry Hansen	(United States) Jerry Hansen	McLaren M1B	Chevrolet	6						1
15=	(United States) Chuck Parsons	(United States) Carl A. Haas Automobiles	McLaren M1C	Chevrolet	Ret	6	Ret	Ret	12	Ret	1
15=	(United States) Bill Eve	(United States) Marvin Webster	Lola T70 Mk.3; Lotus 19	Chevrolet; Ford	Ret	10	Ret	6	9	DNS	1
15=	(United States) Rick Muther	(United States) Rick Muther	Lola T70 Mk.2	Chevrolet			Ret		Ret	6	1
Pos	Driver	Team	Car	Engine	Rd 1	Rd 2	Rd 3	Rd 4	Rd 5	Rd 6	Total
