= Jerry Hansen (racing driver) =

American racing driver (born 1936)

- Nationality: (United States) American
- Born: Gerald Jon Hansen; October 23, 1936 (age 90) Minneapolis, Minnesota, U.S.
- Relatives: Courtney Hansen (daughter)

Awards
- 1971: SCCA President's Cup

Gerald Jon Hansen (born October 23, 1936, in Minneapolis, Minnesota) is a former racing driver. Hansen has won a record of 27 SCCA National Championships. Hansen has also competed in Can-Am, the Atlantic Championship, USAC ChampCar among other series.

== Racing career ==
=== Early career ===
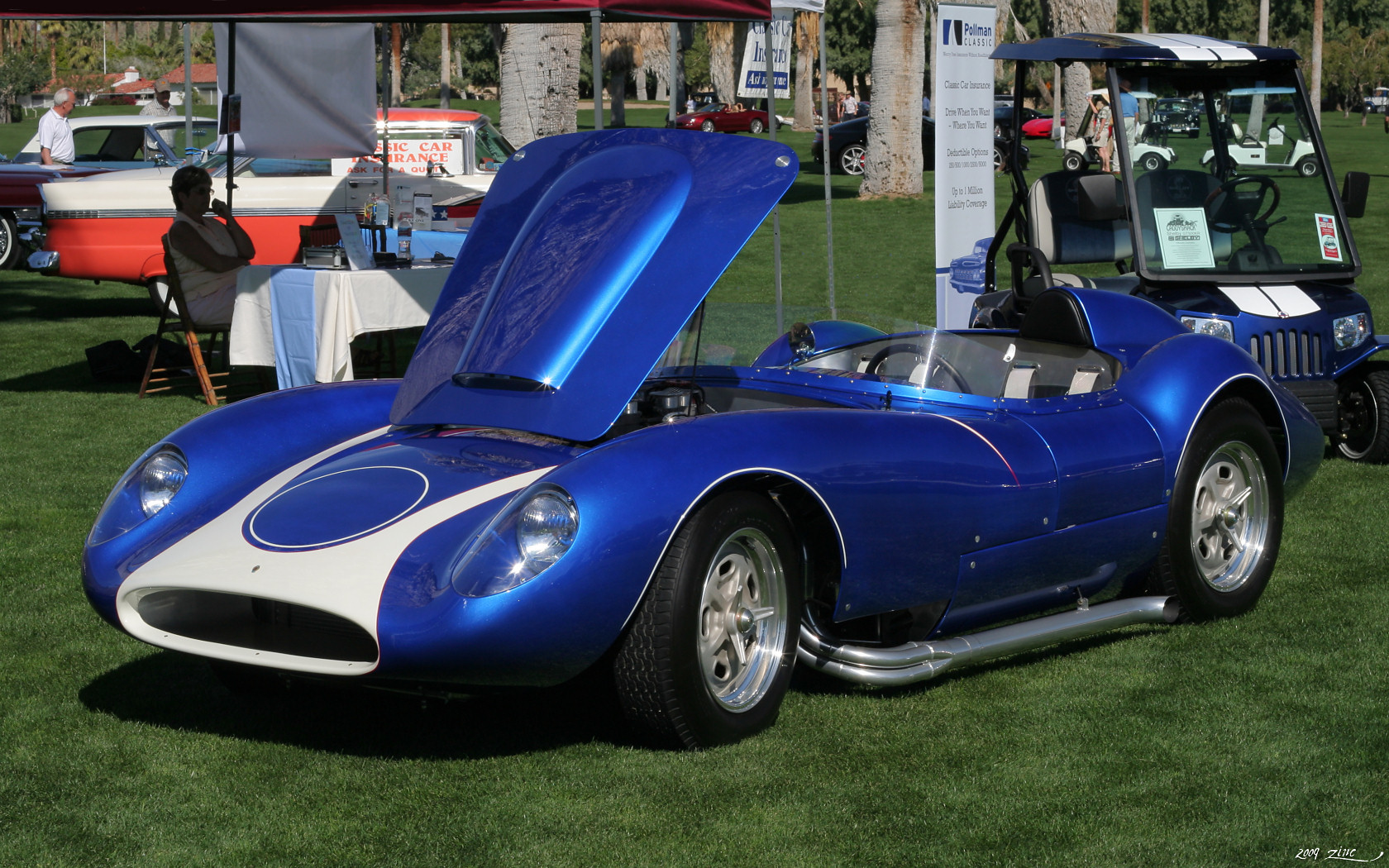
A Scarab Mk.II similar to which Hansen raced.

Minneapolis stockbroker and real estate investor Jerry Hansen started his racing career in 1961 in an Echidna Racing Special in the SCCA C Modified class. In 1965, Hansen traded his Echidna for a Scarab Mk.II. In his first race at Road America, Hansen had a fearsome crash. At the Carousel corner, the Scarab skidded off the track and hit the guardrail. The car flipped multiple times, was on fire, and knocked over a tree. Hansen's injuries were minor.

=== Open wheel racing ===
Hansen made his SCCA National Championship Runoffs debut in the Formula Vee class. Racing at Riverside Raceway, he finished fourth, behind William Duckworth, Roger Barr and winner Lewis Kerr. Stepping up to Formula 5000, Hansen was a longtime competitor in the class. In the 1968 SCCA Grand Prix Championship, Hansen won the Badger 200 at Road America. Starting the race from the pole position, Hansen beat his competition in the combined Formula A, Formula B, and Formula C field. At the 1968 SCCA National Championship Runoffs Hansen finished second in the Formula A class, 5,5 seconds behind Ron Grable. In 1969 Hansen was on the entry list for most of the races. However, technical retirements hampered strong results. For the final race at Sebring, Hansen was signed by Carl Haas Racing Team. After starting the Lola T190 in eighth place, Hansen finished fifteenth. After not racing in the national Formula 5000 series, Hansen returned in the class for 1971. After scoring a heat win, he finished the main race in second place, behind Hogan Racings David Hobbs.

During the season, Hansen also made four appearances in the pinnacle of American autosport, the USAC National Championship. He failed to finish due to a broken valve in his debut race at his home track, Brainerd International Raceway. Hansen had a better run at Pacific Raceways. A doubleheader, with two 45-lap races on the same day, Hansen finished in the top ten twice. He beat many series regulars such as Bobby Unser, Mark Donohue and Billy Vukovich. After a mediocre 1970 racing season, Hansen won several championships in 1971. In 1971, Hansen won the SCCA National Championship Runoffs in Formula A, A Sports Racer, and A Production. It was the first time in Runoffs history that a driver won three classes at the Runoffs in the same year. This feat earned him the SCCA President's Cup.

Hansen, and his crew chief Mike Lindorfer, made modifications to the Lola T192 IndyCar to run in USAC and IMCA sprint car races. In a spectacular race at the Minnesota State Fair, Hansen won by lapping the whole field three times.

=== Sports car racing ===
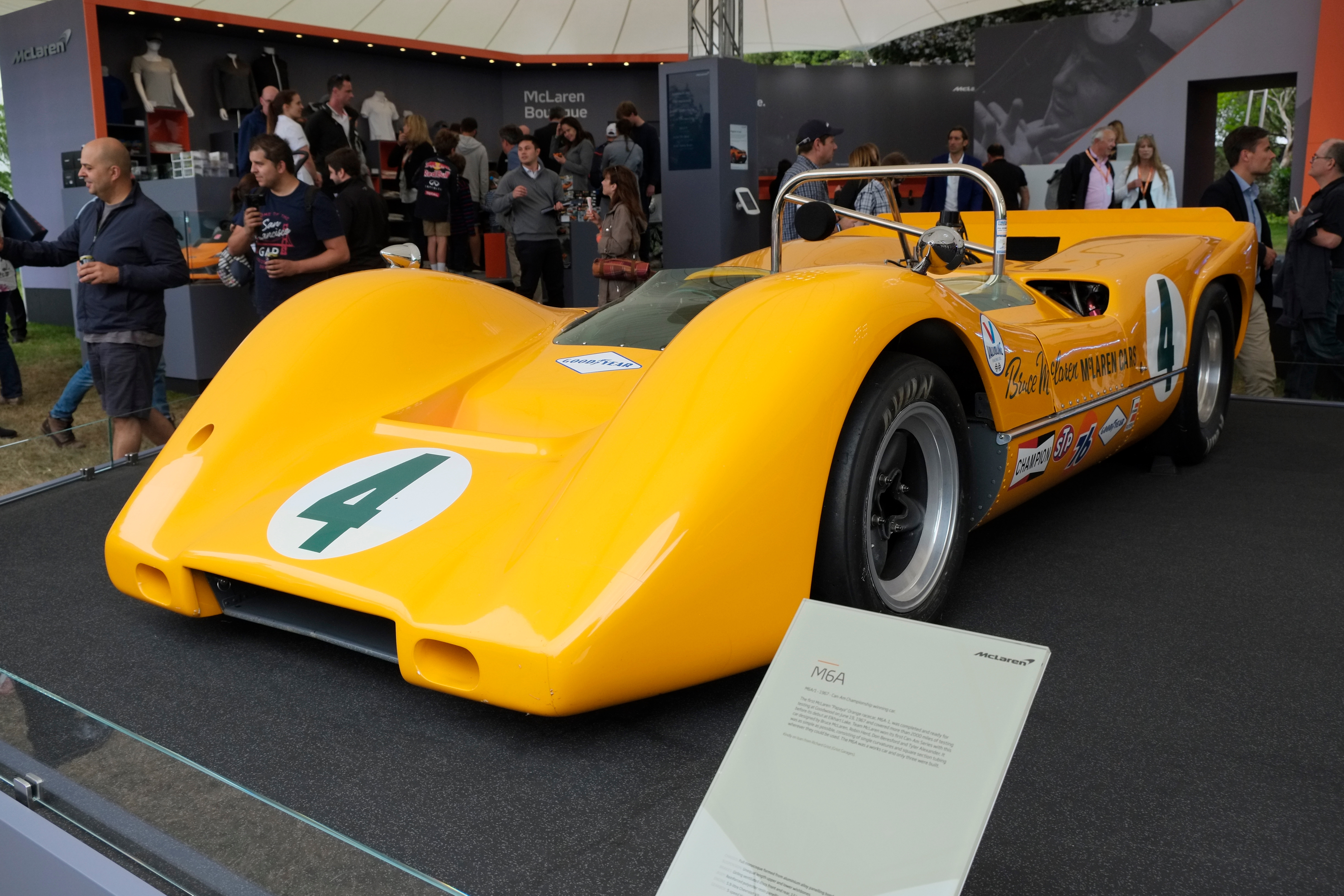
A McLaren M6A similar to which Hansen raced.

Hansen raced in the original United States Road Racing Championship, sanctioned by the SCCA. After a couple of races, during 1964 and 1965, Hansen competed in most of the 1966 season. Racing a Chevrolet powered Lotus 19 proved no success. In 1965, Hansen requested Lee Dykstra and George Anderson to design and build a Can-Am spec car, the Wolverine LD65. Although the plan was to build three cars, only one was built. The first race at Mid-Ohio proved fruitless with retirement after 27 of 85 laps. During his Can-Am debut, in 1966 at Mont-Tremblant, he finished in 20th place. Hansen returned to Can-Am competition in 1967 at Road America in a McLaren M1C. In 1968, Hansen raced most of the Can-Am season in a McLaren M6A. His best result came at the Los Angeles Times Grand Prix finishing seventh. During the same year, he also won the A Sports Racer class at the SCCA National Championship Runoffs in the McLaren M6A. He won the prestigious race for Can-Am spec cars in 1969, 1971, 1972, and 1975 thru 1984. Hansen also raced in the B Sports Racer class in 1973 and 1974 winning both races.

In the SCCA regional competition, Hansen was very successful in racing a McKee Chevette, designed and built by Bob McKee. Hansen won races at Breezy Point, Lynndale Farms, Metropolitan Stadium and Meadlowlands.

=== GT racing ===
Hansen was also a successful GT racer. The driver won the SCCA National Championship Runoffs in the A Production class in 1972 racing a Chevrolet Corvette C3. In 1975 Hansen made his Trans-Am Series debut at Nelson Ledges. He won the following two Trans-Am races at Road America and Brainerd. Hansen continued in Trans-Am in 1976 and 1977. In 1977 he finished third at Road America after starting 39th. He won another Trans-Am Series race in 1978 racing a DeKon Monza at Brainerd. Racing a Corvette, Hansen won two races in the 1982 Trans-Am Series.

== Brainerd International Raceway ==
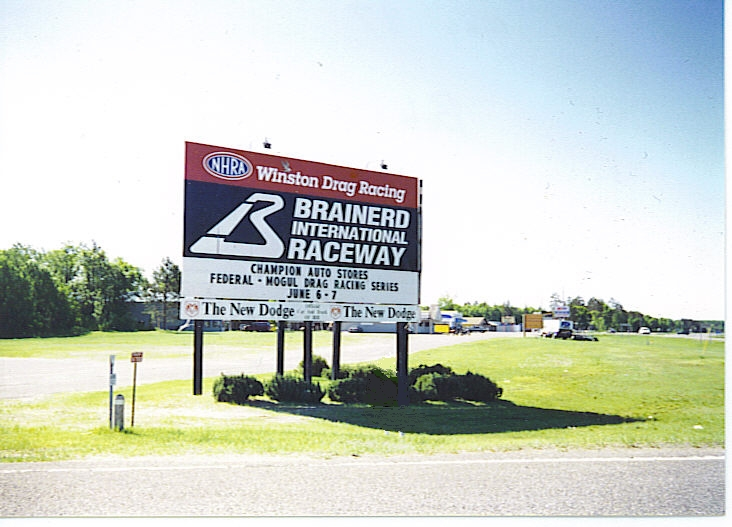
The welcome sign at BIR during the Hansen ownership years.

Hansen bought Donnybrooke Speedway in 1973 from the original owner George Montgomery, renaming the track Brainerd International Raceway. Hansen placed a new management team with Mario Andretti as a director for several years. The track had closed down after 1972, but Hansen re-opened the track in 1975 with the Trans-Am Series returning. In 1977, a drag strip was added with the NHRA visiting the track regularly. Under Hansen's reign, the AMA Superbike Championship was introduced to the track in 1982. The Superbike World Championship also visited the track, in 1989, 1990, and 1991. Hansen sold the track in 2006 to Jed and Kristi Copham.

== Motorsport results ==
=== SCCA National Championship Runoffs ===
Year	Track	Car	Engine	Class	Finish	Start	Status
1964	Riverside	Formcar	Volkswagen	Formula Vee	4		Running
1967	Daytona	Lola	Chevrolet	C Sports Racer	1	1	Running
1968	Riverside	McLaren M6A	Chevrolet	A Sports Racer	1	13	Running
1968	Riverside	Lola	Chevrolet	Formula A	2	1	Running
1969	Daytona	McLaren M12	Chevrolet	A Sports Racer	1	1	Running
1970	Road Atlanta	Lola T220	Chevrolet	A Sports Racer	2	1	Running
1970	Road Atlanta	McLaren M10	Chevrolet	Formula A	8	5	Not running
1971	Road Atlanta	Lola T220	Chevrolet	A Sports Racer	1	1	Running
1971	Road Atlanta	Chevrolet Corvette	Chevrolet	A Production	3	2	Running
1971	Road Atlanta	Lola T192	Chevrolet	Formula A	1	1	Running
1972	Road Atlanta	Lola T300	Chevrolet	Formula A	1	1	Running
1972	Road Atlanta	Lola T310	Chevrolet	A Sports Racer	1	1	Running
1972	Road Atlanta	Chevrolet Corvette	Chevrolet	A Production	1	1	Running
1973	Road Atlanta	Lola T330	Chevrolet	Formula A	1	1	Running
1973	Road Atlanta	Lola T292	Ford	B Sports Racer	1	1	Running
1974	Road Atlanta	Lola T292	Ford	B Sports Racer	1	1	Running
1974	Road Atlanta	Lola T332	Chevrolet	Formula A	1	1	Running
1975	Road Atlanta	Lola T220	Chevrolet	A Sports Racer	1	1	Running
1975	Road Atlanta	Lola T330	Chevrolet	Formula A	1	1	Running
1976	Road Atlanta	Lola T220	Chevrolet	A Sports Racer	1	1	Running
1976	Road Atlanta	Lola T330	Chevrolet	Formula A	1	1	Running
1976	Road Atlanta	Lola T460	Ford	Formula B	2	1	Running
1977	Road Atlanta	Lola T460	Ford	Formula B	DNS		Did not start
1977	Road Atlanta	Lola T332CS	Chevrolet	A Sports Racer	1	1	Running
1978	Road Atlanta	Lola T460	Chevrolet	Formula B	1	2	Running
1978	Road Atlanta	Lola T332	Chevrolet	A Sports Racer	1	1	Running
1979	Road Atlanta	Lola T332	Chevrolet	A Sports Racer	1	1	Running
1980	Road Atlanta	March 79B	Ford	Formula Atlantic	11	7	Not running
1980	Road Atlanta	Lola T333CS	Chevrolet	A Sports Racer	1	1	Running
1980	Road Atlanta	Chevrolet Corvette	Chevrolet	B Production	1	2	Running
1981	Road Atlanta	Lola T332	Chevrolet	A Sports Racer	1	1	Running
1982	Road Atlanta	Lola T332	Chevrolet	A Sports Racer	1	2	Running
1982	Road Atlanta	Chevrolet Camaro	Chevrolet	GT1	DNS		Did not start
1983	Road Atlanta	Ralt RT4	Ford	Formula Atlantic	DNS		Did not start
1983	Road Atlanta	Lola T332	Chevrolet	A Sports Racer	1	1	Running
1983	Road Atlanta	Nissan 280ZX Turbo	Nissan	Showroom Stock GT	2	6	Running
1983	Road Atlanta	Chevrolet Camaro	Chevrolet	GT1	1	3	Running
1984	Road Atlanta	Pontiac Trans-Am	Chevrolet	GT1	2	4	Running
1984	Road Atlanta	Lola T332	Chevrolet	A Sports Racer	1	1	Running
1986	Road Atlanta	Pontiac Trans-Am	Chevrolet	GT1	3	2	Running

=== American Open-Wheel racing results ===
(key) (Races in bold indicate pole position, races in italics indicate fastest race lap)

==== SCCA Grand Prix Championship ====
Year	Team	Car	1	2	3	4	5	6	7	8	9	10	11	12	13	Rank	Points
1968	Jerry Hansen	Lola T140	CDR; 2	WBR	ROA; 1	THO; 25	MOS; 7	LRP	BIR; 3	LS						4th	19
1969	Jerry Hansen	McLaren M10A	RIV; 4	LS; DNS	CDR; 15	SON; DNS	SEA; 19	ROA; 31	LRP1	BIR; 3	MOS	LRP	TRE	THO	SEB; 15	11th	7
1971	Autocomp	Lola T192	RIV	LS	SEA	MOH	ROA; 2	EDM	BIR; 9	LRP						14th	17
1972	Jerry Hansen	Lola T300	LS; 16	SEA; 6	WGI	ROA; 17	BRA; 2	ATL	LRP	RIV; DNS						10th	21

==== USAC Championship Car ====
Year	Entrant	Car	1	2	3	4	5	6	7	8	9	10	11	12	13	14	15	16	17	18	19	20	21	22	23	24	Pos	Points
1969	Pacesetter Racing	Lola T152	PHX1	HAN	INDY	MIL1	LAN	PIP	CDR	NAZ	TRE1	IRP1	IRP2	MIL2	SPR	DIS	DQSF	ISF	BRN1; 17	BRN1	TRE2	SAC	KEN1; 7	KEN2; 8	PHX2	RIV; DNQ	-	-

==== Atlantic Championship ====
Year	Entrant	1	2	3	4	5	6	7	8	9	10	Pos	Points
1980		LBH	SON	WMP	BIR; 3	LRP	ROA	TRO	BRI	MON	MEX	19th	19
