= Autodynamics (race car manufacturer) =

- Type: Corporation
- Industry: Automotive
- Founded: 1963
- Founder: Ray Caldwell
- Defunct: 1975
- Headquarters: Marblehead, Massachusetts

(United States) Autodynamics
- Founded: 1964
- Folded: 1971
- Base: Marblehead, Massachusetts
- Team principal(s): Ray Caldwell
- Former series: Can-Am; Trans-Am Series
- Noted drivers: (United States) Sam Posey (United States) Brett Lunger (United States) Tony Adamowicz (United States) Ronnie Bucknum

Autodynamics Corp. is a former American racecar manufacturer based in Marblehead, Massachusetts. The company mainly produced Formula Vee and Formula Ford chassis. The company was also active in the Trans-Am Series entering Dodge Challengers in the 1970 season.

== History ==
=== Formula Vee beginnings ===
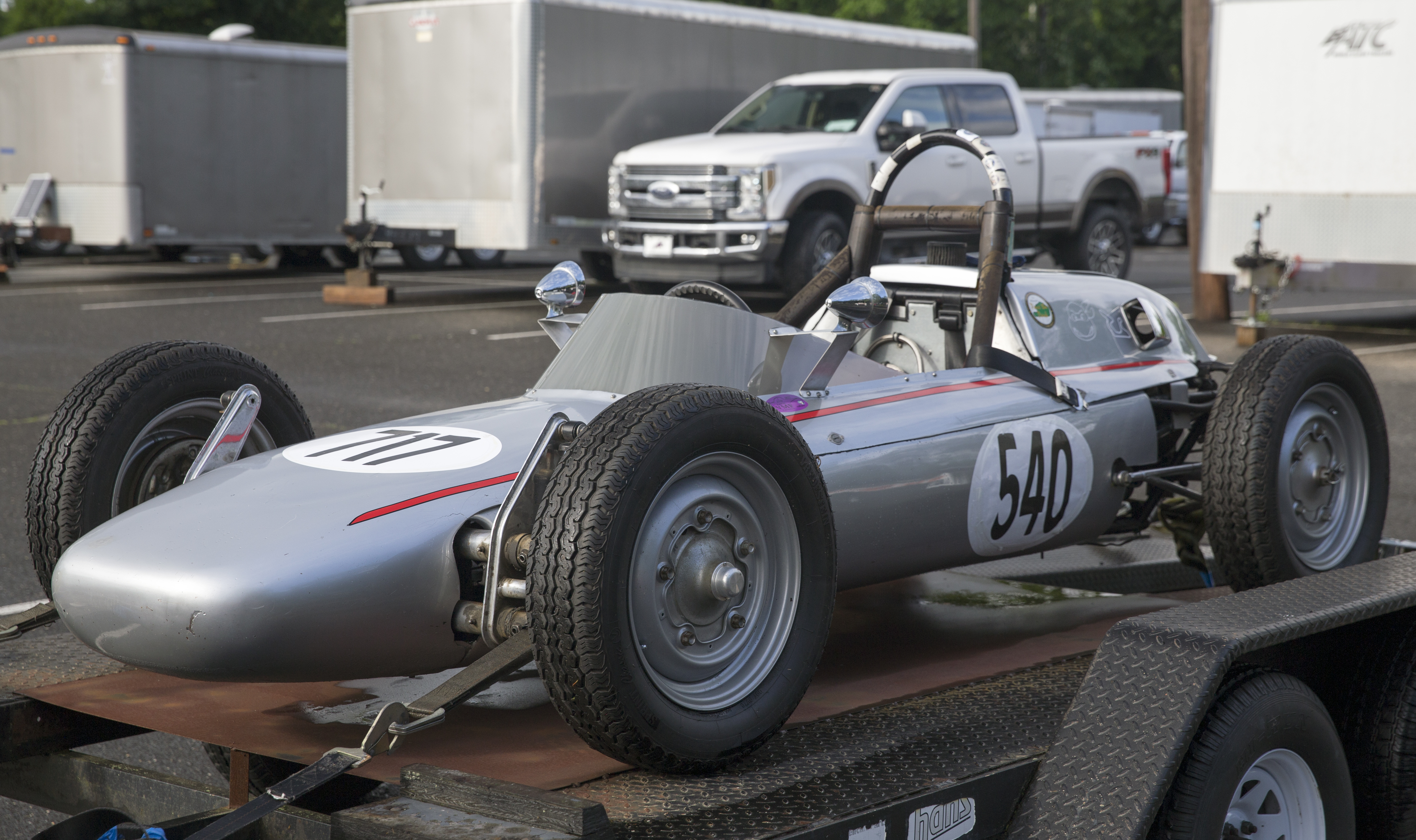
1964 Autodynamics D-1 Formula Vee car

Formula Vee was announced in 1960 by the Sports Car Club of America (SCCA) and Volkswagen of America. Caldwell designed the Caldwell D-1 based on a Cooper formula car chassis and built it with help from friends. The D-1 was received well by the public and Caldwell decided to produce the car. The D-1 was produced in 1964 and 1965 in different variants. In 1964 the SCCA included the Formula Vee class in the SCCA National Championship Runoffs. Autodynamics, along with Formcar and Zink Cars, were the pioneers of the series. Lewis Kerr won the inaugural SCCA National Championship Runoffs for Formula Vee in a Formcar, and Roger Barr finished second. Autodynamics produced a total of 478 Formula Vees. It took Autodynamics until 1972 to win a National Championship in Formula Vee. Dave Weitzenhof beat a field with many Zink and Lynx chassis. Caldwell's final FV design, the D-13, had a zero-roll-stiffness rear suspension and aerodynamic body that dominated SCCA National Races for several years. However, frequently repeated claims that Reeves Callaway won the National Championship in a D-13 in 1973 are exaggerated. Callaway did finish the race in first place, but was subsequently disqualified for illegal engine modifications.

=== Formula Ford ===
The Caldwell D-9 was the first Formula Ford chassis made in the U.S. It followed the chassis and suspension design of the British Merlin FF. Introduced for the 1969 season, a D-9 piloted by Skip Barber won the SCCA North East Division championship as well as the National Championship Runoffs. A Caldwell D-9 also won the inaugural race sanctioned by the IMSA. At Pocono Raceway Formula Ford cars ran on the 5/8-mile oval track for 200 laps. Caldwell driver Jim Clarke was declared the winner. David Loring won many FF races in a D-9, including the Ontario and Canadian Formula Ford series, as well as the IMSA Pro Series. Loring later drove the Gurney Eagle FF.

=== Caldwell D-7 ===
In 1967 Autodynamics launched the Caldwell D7 built to Group 7 rules to enter the 1967 Can-Am season. Sam Posey again was the main driver for the team with Brett Lunger and Ray Caldwell driving selected rounds. The D7 made its debut at Road America where it retired with a broken half shaft. At Mosport Park Posey finished twelfth, the best result of the season. Autodynamics also entered a McLaren Mk. II when the D7 was not ready. With Posey scoring a podium at Stardust International Raceway. The D7 returned in 1968 where it finished fourth at Autódromo Hermanos Rodríguez, the first round of the 1968 United States Road Racing Championship. The following round, at Riverside Raceway, Posey improved to third, scoring the cars only podium finish. By then, the major teams had switched to big-block Chevvy and Ford alloy V8s and recognized the Autodynamics team as the fastest of the small-block cars. The D-7 experimented with live axle suspensions, front and rear as Caldwell believed that was the optimal geometry for keeping the exceedingly wide tires flat on the track. Eventually, Posey's team abandoned the D-7 for a more conventional Lola T-160 CanAm chassis.

=== Formula 5000 ===
Autodynamics had a short lived Formula 5000 project with the Caldwell D8, another unusual live axle racing design. Lunger and Posey were the drivers for the one off project. Two chassis were built. Lunger crashed the first chassis during a test, the races were done with a second chassis. In the pro-series Posey scored the best result, a seventh place at Lime Rock Park. Sam Posey went on to earn the runner-up title twice in the U.S. F/5000 series in 1971 and 1972. In 1972, he did not run the complete eight-race series but still placed second three times and third twice.

=== Trans-Am Series ===
Chrysler entered the Trans-Am Series with their two pony car types the Plymouth 'Cuda and the Dodge Challenger. The 'Cudas were entered by Dan Gurneys All American Racers as a factory funded effort. Caldwell "owned" the team/cars and was responsible for the final completion of the chassis' after receiving them from AAR (photos of the cars as-received from AAR at Caldwell's temporary Autodynamics West shop at Reath Automotive in Long Beach, Ca, Sam Posey's Mudge Pond Express page Chapter 6 page 129 and Autoweek ads for the Challengers "for sale" in the issue of 5/22/1971 confirms) versus AAR sending the 'Cudas back to Chrysler for travelling display purposes and later sold off to SCCA Club racers, Temporary housing for all of the Autodynamics crew was set up at the Cloud Motel in Lakewood, Ca. AAR performed all the initial engineering, modification and extensive fabrication of the body-in-white (no VIN Numbers for street use) uni-bodies, fenders, k-frame and "other" components (progress of chassis development and completion dated letter from AAR/Bob R.L. Tarozzi to Pete Hutchinson at Chrysler dated 2/2/1970 confirms). AAR sent the later production line body-in-white chasses out to have them stripped of all paint (receipt from Superior Paint Stripping Inc. Anaheim, CA dated 3-13-70 confirms). The Cuda and Challenger chasses were sent to Aerochem, Inc in Orange, Ca for "chemmilling of .006-.007 in. per surface (see Aerochem invoice dated 11/18/69 confirms). Sam Posey was the full-time driver for the first Dodge Challenger. It has been stated that the first chassis was left in the acid too long weakening the roof and structural integrity of the car (see Chapter 6, page 135 Mudge Pond Express confirms). The car required multiple chassis repairs between races. until AAR came up with a solution to re-enforce the torsion bar areas in the floor that were tearing under hard braking and cornering forces (photos of the floor and cage re-enforcements from Chrysler Archives confirms). All chassis, braking, suspension and steering components were fabricated by AAR and sent to Caldwell (letter from Carroll Smith-Autodynamics Product Engineer letter to Bruce Junor at AAR dated 6/19/1979 confirms). The de-stroked 340 ci based engine to 305ci Dodge V8 engines (built by Keith Black) proved unreliable due to factory lifter angles and push rod length design not conducive to high rpm racing requirements causing multiple retirements. Posey scored three podium finishes during the season accumulating all the team's points. During the last two races, at Seattle and Riverside, a second car was entered. Ronnie Bucknum and Tony Adamowicz. The second car retired in both races.

A Mid-Season decision by Chrysler to not return in 1971 killed off the efforts (internal memorandum from Max Muhlman announcing a reorganization due to Chrysler funding cutbacks dated 5/21/1970 and Chrysler letter from Pete Hutchinson to Bruce Junor at AAR dated 10/13/1970 confirms). Ford and Chevrolet also canceled their racing programs.

Autodynamics eventually built 3 Challengers and Black provided 12 engines during the season. The cancellation led to a financial crisis for Autodynamics which was forced to reorganize under Chapter 11, Title 11, United States Code. In 1972, Caldwell and entrepreneur Bob MacArthur launched an electric passenger car development program in an attempt to save the company. The firm converted a number of gasoline production cars to run on electric motors, but lead-acid battery technology was too heavy and inefficient for widespread acceptance.

== Production ==
Year	Car	Units produced	Class
1964	Caldwell D-1	186	Formula Vee
1964	Style Fitch Supersprint	1	
1965	Caldwell D-1A	194	Formula Vee
1965	Fiberfabs chassis	12	
1965	Motorcycle chassis	5	
1966	Caldwell D-1B	98	Formula Vee
1966	Caldwell D-2	386	Formula Vee trailer
1966	Caldwell D-3	8	Formula B
1967	Caldwell D-7	2	Group 7
1967	Caldwell D-4	94	Formula Vee
1967	Caldwell D-6	802	Mk. I Deserter
1967	Caldwell D-6A	410	Mk. II Deserter
1967	Caldwell D-8	2	Formula A
1968	Caldwell D-4A	148	Formula Vee
1968	Caldwell D-5	43	Hustler
1968	Caldwell D-11	138	Deserter Autocross
1969	Caldwell D-4B	65	Formula Vee
1969	Caldwell D-9	55	Formula Ford
1970	Caldwell D-9B	48	Formula Ford
1970	Caldwell D-10	17	Formula Super Vee
1970	Caldwell D-9B	48	Formula Ford
1970	Dodge Challenger T/A	3	Trans-Am Series
1970	Caldwell D-14B	8	Racecar trailer
1970	Caldwell D-15C	3	Racecar trailer
1971	Caldwell D-12	48	Formula Ford
1971	Caldwell D-13	74	Formula Vee
1971	Caldwell D-14A	48	Formula Vee trailer
1972	OD-11 Boat hull	48	

== Race results ==
=== SCCA Runoffs results ===
Year	Class	Car	Driver	Finish	Start
1964	Formula Vee	Autodynamics	Roger Barr	2	
1964	Formula Vee	Autodynamics	Lars Giertz	13	
1964	Formula Vee	Autodynamics	Martin Grantham	16	
1965	Formula Vee	Autodynamics	Joseph Dodge	3	
1965	Formula Vee	Autodynamics	Bill Scott	6	8
1965	Formula Vee	Autodynamics	Robert Samm	8	9
1966	Formula Vee	Autodynamics	Robert Samm	9	
1966	Formula Vee	Autodynamics	Don Zacharie	2	
1966	Formula Vee	Autodynamics	Steve Burtis	7	
1966	Formula Vee	Autodynamics	Ramon Stewart	14	
1966	Formula Vee	Autodynamics	Larry Gross	15	
1966	Formula Vee	Autodynamics	William Denison	6	
1966	Formula Vee	Autodynamics	Bob Chamberlain	12	
1967	Formula Vee	Autodynamics	William Denison	14	
1967	Formula Vee	Autodynamics	John Magee	8	8
1967	Formula Vee	Autodynamics	Robert Samm	9	11
1967	Formula Vee	Autodynamics	Don Walkner	10	15
1967	Formula Vee	Autodynamics	Franz Gillebard	11	14
1967	Formula Vee	Autodynamics	Bill Scott	6	10
1969	Formula Ford	Caldwell D9	Skip Barber	1	20
1969	Formula Ford	Caldwell D9	Gary Belcher	8	15
1969	Formula Vee	Autodynamics	John Magee	9	2
1969	Formula Vee	Autodynamics	Glen Biren	17	11
1969	Formula Vee	Autodynamics	Glen Sullivan	7	6
1969	Formula B	Caldwell	Harvey Simon	10	18
1969	Formula Ford	Caldwell D9	James Clarke	16	4
1969	Formula Ford	Caldwell D9	Herb Brownell	6	9
1970	Formula Super Vee	Caldwell D10	Ray Caldwell	4	7
1970	Formula Super Vee	Caldwell D10	Tim Sharp	11	10
1970	Formula Super Vee	Caldwell D10	Don Zacharie	7	8
1971	Formula Super Vee	Caldwell	Kirk Stowers	7	
1971	Formula Vee	Autodynamics	Bill Bailes	18	15
1971	Formula Vee	Autodynamics	Dave Weitzenhof	13	8
1972	Formula Vee	Autodynamics	Dave Weitzenhof	1	5
1972	Formula Vee	Autodynamics	Bill Bailes	16	20
1973	Formula Vee	Caldwell D13	Reeves Callaway	DSQ	5
1973	Formula Vee	Autodynamics	Bob Cunningham	9	
1973	Formula Ford	Caldwell	Bill Alsup	15	19
1973	Formula Vee	Autodynamics	John Helming	DNS	
1974	Formula Vee	Caldwell D13	Michael Billesbach	15	26
1974	Formula Vee	Caldwell D13	Don Courtney	22	18
1974	Formula Vee	Caldwell D13	John Helming	5	6
1975	Formula Vee	Caldwell D13	Michael Billesbach	13	14
1975	Formula Vee	Caldwell	James Havell	14	20
1975	Formula Vee	Autodynamics	Jon van de Car	21	18
1976	Formula Vee	Caldwell D13	Cleve Domingue	22	26
1976	Formula Vee	Autodynamics	Steve Burtis	23	12
1976	Formula Vee	Caldwell	James Havell	26	2
1976	Formula Vee	Autodynamics Mk. 5X	Jonathan Weisheit	23	12
1976	Formula Vee	Caldwell D13	John Haydon	9	19
1976	Formula Vee	Caldwell D13	Jon van de Car	21	3
1977	Formula Vee	Caldwell D13	Jim Burnett	17	23
1977	Formula Vee	Caldwell D13	Hank Henschen, Jr.	27	34
1977	Formula Vee	Autodynamics	Wallace Reetz	11	16
1977	Formula Vee	Caldwell D13	John Haydon	13	17
1977	Formula Vee	Caldwell D13	James Havell	5	5
1977	Formula Vee	Caldwell	Gerald Knapp	4	6
1977	Formula Vee	Caldwell D13	Jonathan Weisheit	10	15
1977	Formula Vee	Caldwell D13	Scott Rubenzer	15	24
1978	Formula Vee	Caldwell D13	James Havell	17	2
1978	Formula Vee	Caldwell D13	John Haydon	19	20
1978	Formula Ford	Caldwell	Terry McKenna	25	29
1978	Formula Vee	Caldwell D13	Jonathan Weisheit	3	5
1978	Formula Vee	Caldwell D13	Scott Rubenzer	8	23
1978	Formula Vee	Caldwell D13	Wallace Reetz	13	13
1978	Formula Vee	Caldwell D13	Ford Smith	9	19
1979	Formula Vee	Caldwell D13	Scott Rubenzer	7	17
1979	Formula Vee	Caldwell	Thomas Schweitz, Jr.	17	10
1980	Formula Vee	Caldwell D13	Fred Clark	20	19
1980	Formula Vee	Caldwell D13	Jon van de Car	13	7
1980	Formula Vee	Caldwell D13	Ford Smith	6	4
1980	Formula Vee	Caldwell D13	Dave Smith	12	17
1980	Formula Vee	Caldwell D13	Scott Rubenzer	7	8
1980	Formula Vee	Caldwell D13	Thomas Schweitz, Jr.	8	15
1980	Formula Vee	Caldwell D13	Blair Dupont	26	29
1980	Formula Vee	Caldwell D13	Ron Fieni	27	1
1980	Formula Vee	Caldwell D13	Robert Culver	23	27
1980	Formula Vee	Caldwell D13	Charles Proctor	24	22
1981	Formula Vee	Caldwell D13	Robert Culver	22	
1981	Formula Vee	Caldwell D13	Scott Rubenzer	4	7
1981	Formula Vee	Caldwell D13	Dave Smith	18	
1981	Formula Vee	Caldwell D13S	Ford Smith	23	
1981	Formula Vee	Caldwell D13	Jon van de Car	14	
1981	Formula Vee	Caldwell D13	Louis Rettenmeier	10	
1981	Formula Vee	Caldwell D13	Mike Palermo, Jr.	20	
1981	Formula Vee	Caldwell D13S	Bill Pryor	7	
1982	Formula Vee	Caldwell D13	Mike Palermo, Jr.	20	
1982	Formula Vee	Caldwell D13	Scott Rubenzer	3	
1982	Formula Vee	Caldwell	Carl Salamon	9	
1982	Formula Vee	Caldwell D13S	Jon van de Car	34	
1982	Formula Vee	Caldwell D13S	Ford Smith	18	
1982	Formula Vee	Caldwell D13	Randy Pollock	13	
1983	Formula Vee	Caldwell D13	Robert Culver	37	25
1983	Formula Vee	Caldwell D13	Carl Salamon	15	16
1983	Formula Vee	Caldwell D13	Scott Rubenzer	2	6
1983	Formula Vee	Caldwell D13	E.J. Kollins	DNS	
1983	Formula Vee	Caldwell D13	Jon van de Car	12	19
1983	Formula Vee	Caldwell D13S	Paul Czekanski	28	37
1983	Formula Vee	Caldwell D13	Jim Kearney	29	12
1983	Formula Vee	Caldwell D13	Dave Smith	11	18
1983	Formula Vee	Caldwell D13	Howard Landon	36	15
1983	Formula Vee	Caldwell D13	Laury Lundberg	26	39
1983	Formula Vee	Caldwell D13	Stephen Oseth	18	34
1984	Formula Vee	Caldwell D13	Stephen Oseth	13	7
1984	Formula Vee	Caldwell D13S	Mike Cochran	27	37
1984	Formula Vee	Caldwell D13	Stephen Ira	17	14
1984	Formula Vee	Caldwell D13	Howard Landon	11	11
1984	Formula Vee	Caldwell D13	John Menzinger	37	31
1985	Formula Vee	Caldwell D13	John Menzinger	37	35
1985	Formula Vee	Caldwell D13	Stephen Oseth	28	6
1985	Formula Vee	Caldwell D13	Howard Landon	15	10
1985	Formula Vee	Caldwell D13	Peter Pires	21	22
1985	Formula Vee	Caldwell D13	George Podgorski	10	9
1986	Formula Vee	Caldwell D13	Peter Pires	18	28
1986	Formula Vee	Caldwell D13	Samuel Ryan	14	20
1986	Formula Vee	Caldwell D13	Mike Palermo, Jr.	36	34
1986	Formula Vee	Caldwell D13	Robert Culver	21	15
1986	Formula Vee	Caldwell D13	Jim Kearney	16	19
1987	Formula Vee	Caldwell	Clayton Cox	28	31
1987	Formula Vee	Caldwell	Samuel Ryan	32	12
1987	Formula Vee	Caldwell D13	Mike Palermo, Jr.	10	13
1987	Formula Vee	Caldwell	Greg Rice	29	7
1987	Formula Vee	Caldwell	Bob Neumeister	7	18
1987	Formula Vee	Caldwell	Michael Rogers	39	38
1987	Formula Vee	Caldwell	Ed Shilen	31	37
1988	Formula Vee	Caldwell	Bob Neumeister	30	1
1988	Formula Vee	Caldwell D13	Howard Landon	15	22
1988	Formula Vee	Caldwell D8	Samuel Ryan	37	29
1989	Formula Vee	Caldwell D13S	Bob Neumeister	37	16
1989	Formula Vee	Caldwell D13	John Fuchs	30	44
1989	Formula Vee	Caldwell D13	Howard Landon	15	28
1990	Formula Vee	Caldwell D13	Howard Landon	4	5
1990	Formula Vee	Caldwell D13	Kent Wiseman	24	37
1990	Formula Vee	Caldwell D13S	Michael Rogers	27	38
1991	Formula Vee	Caldwell D13S	Bob Neumeister	39	12
1993	Formula Vee	Caldwell D13S	Michael Rogers	39	53
2004	Formula Vee	Caldwell D13	Greg Rice	43	31
2009	Formula Vee	Caldwell D13	Stuart Delaney	23	37
2010	Formula Vee	Caldwell D13	Stuart Delaney	36	32
2012	Formula Vee	Caldwell D13	Terran Swanson	18	27

=== Can-Am Series ===
(key) (Races in bold indicate pole position) (Races in italics indicate fastest lap)

Year	Car	No.	Drivers	1	2	3	4	5	6	Pos.	Pts
1966	Caldwell D7	22	(United States) Sam Posey	(Canada); MTE; 21						-	0
1966	McLaren M1B	33	(United States) Sam Posey		(United States); BRI; 8	(Canada); MOS; 20	(United States); LAG; 38	(United States); RIV; 18	(United States); LVE; 21	-	0
1967	Caldwell D7B	1	(United States) Sam Posey	(United States); ROA; 32	(United States); BRI; 24	(Canada); MOS; 12	(United States); LAG; 29	(United States); RIV; 13	(United States); LVE; DNS	-	0
1968	Caldwell D7C	1	(United States) Sam Posey	(United States); ROA; 10						9th	5
1968	Lola T160	2	(United States) Sam Posey		(United States); BRI; 8	(Canada); EDM; 4	(United States); LAG; 9	(United States); RIV; 21	(United States); LVE; 5	9th	5

=== SCCA Continental Championship Formula A results ===
(key) (Races in bold indicate pole position) (Races in italics indicate fastest lap)

Year	Car	No.	Drivers	1	2	3	4	5	6	7	8	Pos.	Pts
1968	Caldwell D8	11	(United States) Brett Lunger	(United States); COL	(United States); OKL	(United States); ROA	(United States); THO	(Canada); MOS; 26		(United States); BRA; 18	(United States); LAG; 28	-	0
1968	Caldwell D8	11	(United States) Sam Posey						(United States); LRP; 7			-	0

=== Trans-Am Series results ===
(key) (Races in bold indicate pole position) (Races in italics indicate fastest lap)

Year	Car	No.	Drivers	1	2	3	4	5	6	7	8	9	10	11	Pos.	Pts
1970	Dodge Challenger T/A	76	(United States) Sam Posey	(United States); LAG; 6	(United States); LRP; 3	(United States); NHS; 23	(United States); MOH; 5	(United States); BRI; 20	(United States); BRA; 20	(United States); ROA; 20	(Canada); TRE; 3	(United States); WAT; 4	(United States); SEA; 3	(United States); RIV; 29	4th	18
1970	Dodge Challenger T/A	77	(United States) Ronnie Bucknum	(United States); LAG	(United States); LRP	(United States); NHS	(United States); MOH	(United States); BRI	(United States); BRA	(United States); ROA	(Canada); TRE	(United States); WAT	(United States); SEA; 27		4th	18
1970	Dodge Challenger T/A	77	(United States) Tony Adamowicz											(United States); RIV; 24	4th	18
