= 1968 SCCA Grand Prix Championship =

Seasons
- ← 1967 1969 →

The 1968 SCCA Grand Prix Championship was the second annual running of the Sports Car Club of America's open wheel automobile racing series later to become known as the SCCA Continental Championship. The championship was open to SCCA Formula A, Formula B and Formula C cars, with Formula A expanded to include vehicles powered by 5 liter production-based engines, with the Formula A category later being renamed to Formula 5000.

== Race results ==
The 1968 SCCA Grand Prix Championship was contested over eight rounds.

Round	Date	Event name	Event location	Duration	Formula A winner Formula A vehicle	Formula B winner Formula B vehicle	Formula C winner Formula C vehicle
1	May 26	Colorado Grand Prix	Continental Divide Raceway	47 laps	Lou Sell Eagle Mk 5 - Chevrolet V8	Joe Alves Brabham BT21A - Ford twin cam	Colin Wilson Lotus 18 - Ford
2	June 16	Grand Prix of Oklahoma	War Bonnet	50 laps	Lou Sell Eagle Mk 5 - Chevrolet V8	Mike Hiss Brabham BT21A - Ford twin cam	Roy Grange Lotus - Ford
3	July 27	Badger 200	Road America	30 laps	Jerry Hansen Lola T140 - Chevrolet V8	Chuck Dietrich McLaren M4B - Ford twin cam	Thomas Gelb Brabham BT2 - Ford
4	August 18	Thompson Grand Prix	Thompson Raceway	65 laps	Lou Sell Eagle Mk 5 - Chevrolet V8	Peter Rehl Cooper T88 - Ford twin cam	
5	August 25	Mosport Continental	Mosport Park	48 laps	Lou Sell Eagle Mk 5 - Chevrolet V8	Bill Brack Lotus 41C - Ford twin cam	Wayne T Mitchell Brabham BT21B - Ford
6	September 2	Lime Rock Grand Prix	Lime Rock Park	75 laps	George Wintersteen Eagle Mk 5 - Chevrolet V8	WP Fred Stevenson Lotus 41C - Ford twin cam	Wayne T Mitchell Brabham BT21B - Ford
7	September 22	Donnybrook Grand Prix	Brainerd International Raceway	70 laps	George Wintersteen Eagle Mk 5 - Chevrolet V8	Chuck Dietrich McLaren M4B - Ford twin cam	Wayne T Mitchell Brabham BT21B - Ford
8	October 12	Ken Miles Memorial Race	Laguna Seca Raceway	53 laps	Lou Sell Eagle Mk 5 - Chevrolet V8	Mike Eyerly McLaren M4B - Ford twin cam	Ed Leslie Brabham

== Points system ==
Championship points were awarded to drivers on a 9-6-4-3-2-1 basis.

== Championship results ==
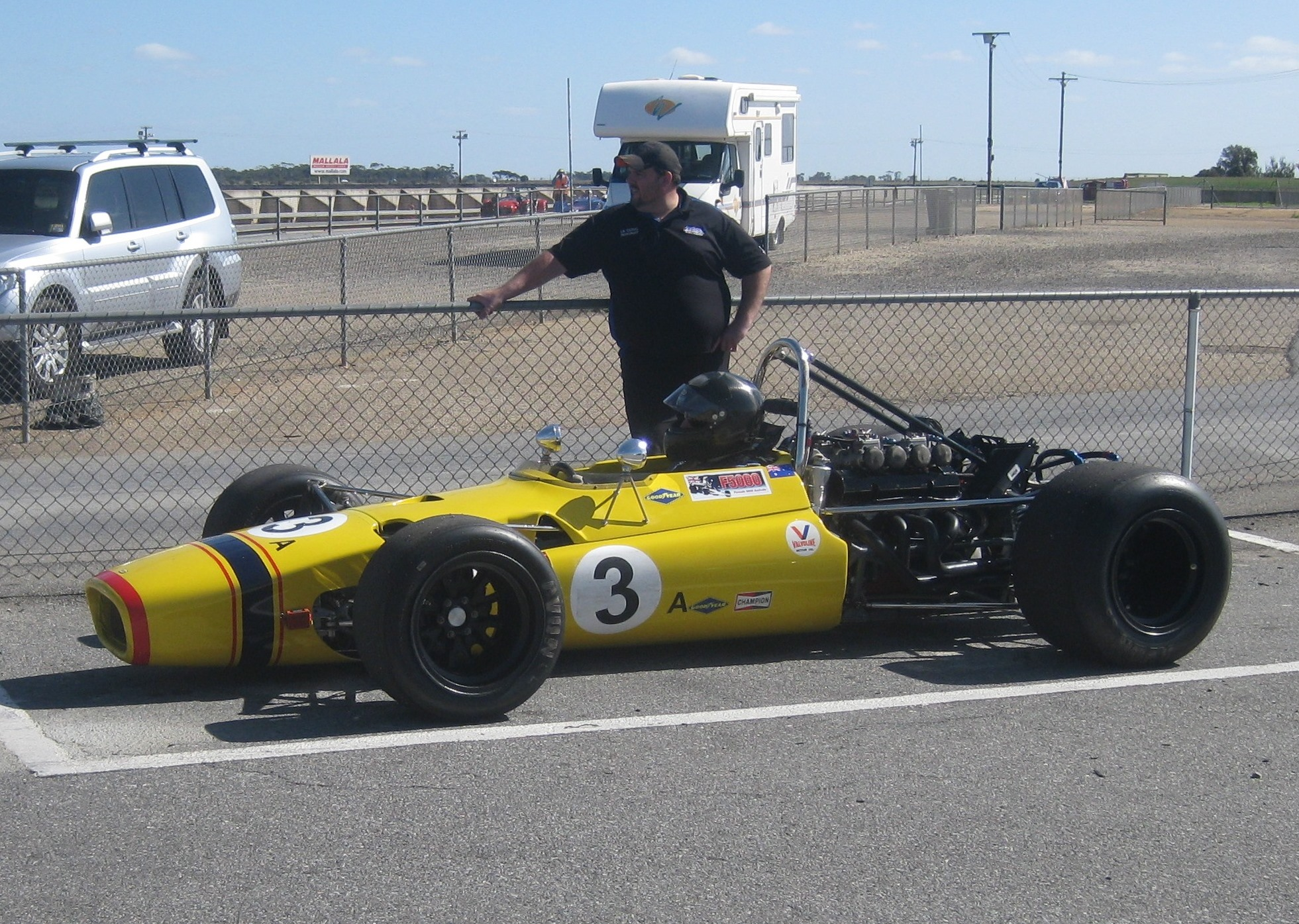
Jerry Hansen placed 4th in the championship driving this Lola T140. The car is pictured in 2014

Position	Driver	Car	Formula	Points
1	(United States) Lou Sell	Eagle Chevrolet	A	50
2	(United States) George Wintersteen	Eagle Chevrolet	A	39
3	(United Kingdom) Bob Brown	Lola T140 Chevrolet	A	23
4	(United States) Jerry Hansen	Lola T140 Chevrolet	A	19
5	(United States) Brian O'Neill	Lola T140 Chevrolet	A	14
6	(United States) Hank Kandler	Lola T140 Chevrolet	A	11
7	(United States) Kurt Reinold	McKee Mk8 Chevrolet	A	8
8	(United States) Bud Morley	McLaren Mk2 Ford; McLaren Mk2 Chevrolet	A	5
=	(United States) John Gunn	Lola T140 Chevrolet	A	5
10	(United States) Mak Kronn	McKee Mk8 Chevrolet	A	4
11	(United States) Fred Stevenson	Lotus Ford	B	3
=	(United States) Mike Hiss	Brabham BT21 Ford	B	3
=	(United States) Mike Eyerly	McLaren Mk4 Ford	B	3
14	(United States) Stew McMillan	Eisert Chevrolet	A	2
=	(United States) Jack Eiteljorg	Eisert Chevrolet	A	2
=	(United States) Steve Durst	Vulcan Chevrolet	A	2
=	(Canada) Dave Ogilvy	Lotus Ford	B	2
18	(Canada) Bill Brack	Lotus 41 Ford	B	1
=	(United States) Joe Alves	Brabham Ford	B	1
=	(United States) Dave Pabst	Lola T140 Chevrolet	A	1
=	(United States) Peter Rehl	Cooper T88 Ford	B	1
=	(United States) Richard Negley	Lotus Ford	B	1
