= Forsgrini Engineering =

Forsgrini Engineering is a former American racecar constructor based in Issaquah, Washington. The company produced various racing cars for Formula C, Tasman Series and other classes.

== History ==
After racing karts in the 1950s brothers Lyle and Dale Forsgren started building and racing cars called Forsgrini. The first car, Mk. I, was built to Sports Car Club of America H Modified specifications. The car featured a Crosley engine and fiberglass body. The Monte Carlo was the brothers second car. Based on Fiat parts the car proved successful. Lyle finished second in the SCCA National Championship Runoffs in the H Sports Racer class in 1966. Lyle finished second to Dan Parkinson in a Dolphin America.

In 1968 Lyle quit Boeing to build race cars full-time. Forsgrini built it first single seater, the Forsgrini Mk. 10. Mike Campbell competed the 1.100cc Ford powered Mk. 10 in Formula C. Campbell won the Runoffs at Riverside International Raceway. Campbell beat Bill Rutan in a Saab powered Quantum by only six tenths of a second.

The constructors debut in Formula 5000 also came in 1968. At the season finale of the 1968 SCCA Grand Prix Championship at Laguna Seca Lyle Forsgren finished in twelfth place. Forsgren ran a factory entered Chevrolet powered Mk. 10 D. For 1969 the Mk. 11 Formula 5000 car was introduced. The car was entered in two pro championship races. Harry Swanson finished thirteenth at Seattle International Raceway. Lyle Forsgren suffered overheating issues and a fuel leak which prevented a finish at Riverside Speedway. Forsgren scored his first (and only) championship points in 1970. At Sears Point Raceway Forsgren finished seventh, scoring four points. Forsgren ran the newest introduction, the Mk.14.

Campbell ran a Ford Boss 302 powered Forsgrini Mk.14 in the 1970 Tasman Series. Campbell scored his only championship point at the Lady Wigram Trophy. At the Wigram Airfield Circuit the American finished sixth. His only other race finish was at Warwick Farm Raceway, a tenth place.

Lyle Forsgren closed Forsgrini Engineering in 1971. After building racecars Lyle moved to Oshkosh, Wisconsin to work for Mercury Marine.

== Racing cars ==
Year	Car	Class
1960	Forsgrini Mk. I	H Modified
1961	Forsgrini Monte Carlo	H Modified
1962	Forsgrini Martini	H Modified
1962	Forsgrini Monaco	G Modified
1963	Forsgrini Veloce	G Modified
1968	Forsgrini Mk. 10 FC	Formula C
1968	Forsgrini Mk. 10D	Formula 5000
1969	Forsgrini Mk. 12 FF	Formula Ford
1969	Forsgrini Mk. 11	Formula 5000
1970	Forsgrini Mk. 14	Formula 5000
