= Formula C =

Formula C may refer to:

- Formula C (game), an upcoming computer game
- Formula C (karting), a defunct 125 cc karting class
- Formula C (SCCA), the predecessor to the Formula Continental SCCA racing class
