= Forsgren =

Forsgren or Forsgrén is a surname. Notable people with the surname include:

- Bella Forsgrén (born 1992), Finnish politician
- John E. Forsgren (1816–1890), Swedish Mormon pioneer and missionary
- Nicole Forsgren, American technology executive, entrepreneur, and author
- Lyle and Dale Forsgren, American builders of Forsgrini race cars
