= Cooper T88 =

The Cooper T88 was an open-wheel formula racing car, designed, developed and built by British manufacturer and constructor Cooper, for the SCCA's Formula C category, in 1968. It was closely based on the Cooper T86 Formula One car. It was colloquially referred to as the Cooper-BRM, due to the 1.0 L (61 cu in) BRM four-cylinder engine that powered it. It was driven by Peter Rehl, and was later converted to a Formula B car, where it was powered by a 1.6 L (98 cu in) naturally-aspirated Ford Twin Cam four-cylinder engine, tuned by Cosworth, to produce between 140–150 hp (100–110 kW). Rehl finished the 1968 season in fourth place, scoring 24 points.
