= Bill Rutan =

American racing driver and hillclimb racer (1931–2018)

Bill Rutan (May 5, 1931 – April 4, 2018) was a racing driver and hillclimb racer. Rutan was the winner of the Climb to the Clouds hillclimb in 1961. Rutan also won the SCCA National Championship Runoffs twice in the Formula C class.

== Racing career ==
=== Early career ===
Rutan was a frequent competitor in the Sports Car Club of America racing scene. In 1954, Rutan competed in the SCCA National Sports Car Championship at Thompson Raceway. In a Lester-MG, Rutan finished third, behind Briggs Cunningham and Sherwood Johnston. The racing driver won the same race in 1957.

In 1955, Rutan made his first appearance in the 12 Hours of Sebring. Together with car owner William Brewster, the duo attempted to win the S3.0 class in an Austin-Healey 100S. In that era, the race was competed according to FIA World Sportscar Championship regulations. However, after 39 laps the team retired the car with a clutch problem. In 1958, Rutan competed in a Volvo at the Pikes Peak International Hill Climb for sportscars.

=== 1958 Porsche Special ===
Rutan started building his own hillclimb racer in 1955. The car featured a 1945 Volkswagen front hood, longitudinals and center tube. The car was modified countless times as Rutan tried different body styles, engine positions, etc. In 1958 the car was fitted with a Porsche 356 Carrera engine. The frame, rollcage, rear suspension and cooling system were designed by Rutan himself. He called the car the Bathtub. The car was later known as the Porsche Special or the Bill Rutan Special.

In 1958, Rutan competed his self-built car in the USAC Road Racing Championship. Facing professionally built sportscars such as the Aston Martin DBR2 and Jaguar D-Type the Porsche Special pulled off impressive results. At the Marlboro Grand Prix, at Marlboro Motor Raceway, Rutan finished in fourth place. Rutan finished sixth in points. Rutan's brother, Charles also competed in the series in the Porsche Special.

Rutan won the 1961 Climb to the Clouds. The car ran the gravel and dirt mountain course in a record time, beating Carroll Shelby's record time set in 1956 in a Ferrari 375 Formula One car.

After 1961, the Climb to the Clouds was not run for another 29 years. The race returned in 1990, now with the track fully paved. Rutan beat his own record by five seconds, racing the same tires used in 1961. Tim O'Neil won the overall hillclimb almost two minutes faster than Rutan in a Volkswagen Golf Rallye.

Rutan later raced the 2007 Pittsburgh Vintage Grand Prix. Rutan sold the car in 2009 to local Connecticut businessman David Winstead. During 15 months, the car was disassembled, cleaned up, and reassembled.

The car was featured on Chasing Classic Cars. Series presenter Wayne Carini raced the Porsche Special at the Grand Ascent in Hershey, Pennsylvania, in 2012. Carini finished second in the hillclimb, beaten only by a 1958 Lotus 7. In August 2012, the car was sold at auction by Mecum Auctions in Monterey, California.

=== Sports car racing ===
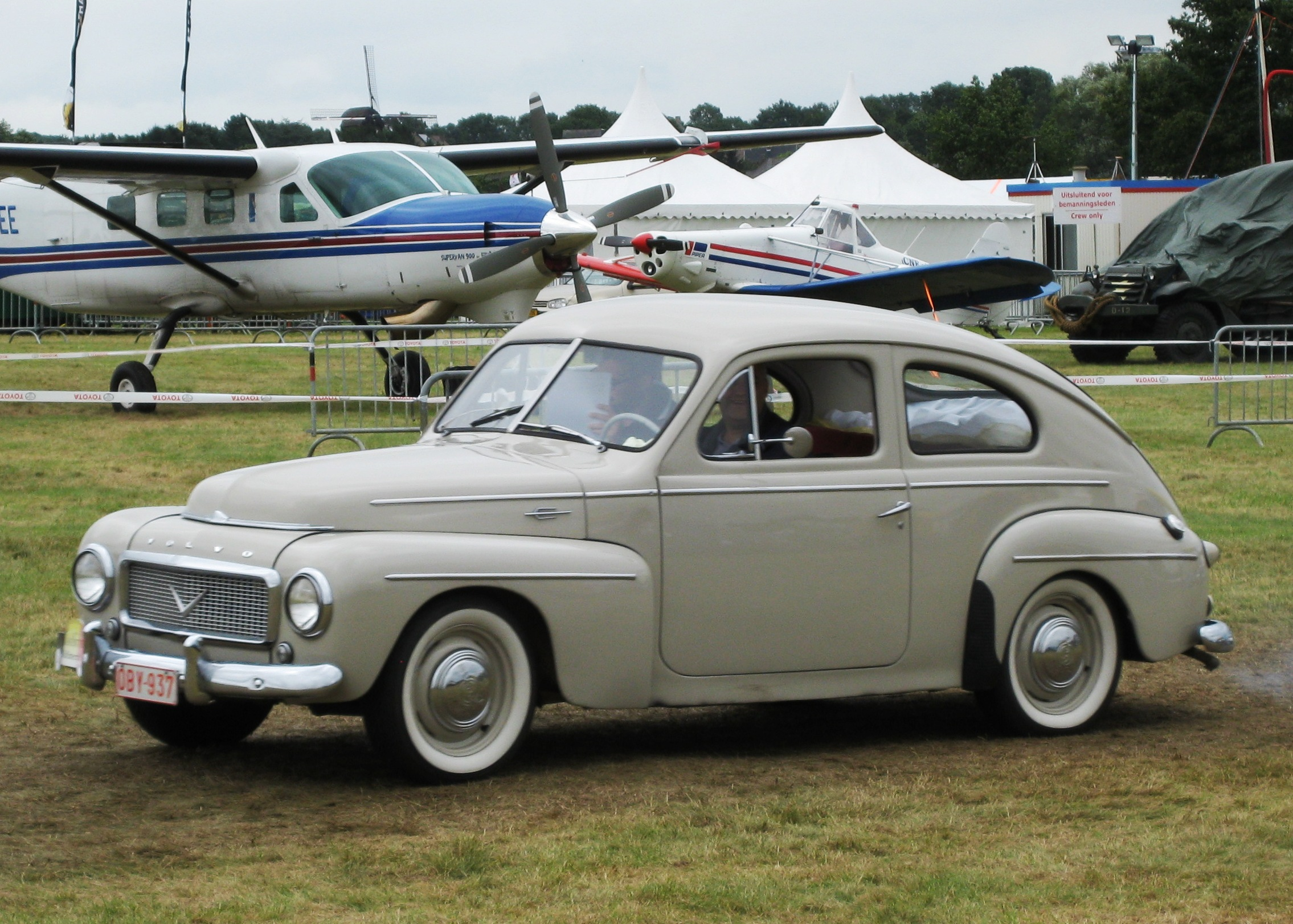
A Volvo PV444 similar to the one raced by Rutan.

After racing his self-built machine, Rutan returned to the 12 Hours of Sebring in 1959. Together with Ray Cuomo and Paul Richards, Rutan won the GT750 class, finishing 28th overall. The team ran a Fiat-Abarth 750 Record Monza.

Rutan was very successful in the Little Le Mans touring car race. Rutan won the first event in 1957 in a Volvo PV444 he shared with Art Riley. The duo again won the same race, in the same car, in 1958. In 1959, Rutan and Riley were leading the race when their clutch broke. Riley, who drove the Volvo PV444 at that point, pulled over. Realizing he could make it to the pits, he got a push from spectators to continue. The team got disqualified for the outside assistance. Not competing the race in 1960, Rutan and Riley returned in 1961. The duo again dominated the race, this time in a Volvo PV544, despite clutch problems. In 1962 Rutan and Riley were on their way for a third place overall, first in class, until the halfshaft of the PV544 broke. The Little Le Mans race folded after the 1962 edition.

Riley and Rutan also competed in the first three runnings of the 12 Hours of Marlboro. In 1961, Riley and Rutan led the race but an extra pitstop dropped the Volvo PV544 entry to second place overall. In 1963, Rutan competed in a Saab 96 with Gaston Andrey. The new duo finished fifth overall, second in class.

Rutan made his 24 Hours of Daytona debut in 1966. This was the very first edition of the race as a 24-hour endurance race. Rutan shared the Ferrari 330P with John Fulp and Bruce Jennings. A broken wheel bearing prevented the team from finishing the race after only two hours of racing.

=== Formula racing ===
In 1965, Rutan acquired a Quantum Motorcars kitcar to assemble. The chassis was designed to compete in the stillborn Formula Saab series. Rutan competed the car in SCCA Formula C competition. The Connecticut racer qualified for the Runoffs at Daytona International Speedway. In the first attempt he failed to finish. A year later, at the Runoffs at Riverside International Raceway, Rutan finished fourth with the underpowered Saab engine. For 1967 Rutan upgraded the car with a Ford-Cosworth engine. This time, Rutan won the race from pole position and scored the fastest race lap. The SCCA North East division driver won the race again in 1969, now racing a Tecno chassis.

Rutan competed in the inaugural SCCA Continental Championship, for Formula A, Formula B and Formula C. At the Bridgehampton Race Circuit, Rutan had to retire his Quantum after four out of 35 laps. In 1968 Rutan won the SCCA North East division Formula C championship beating Peter Rehl. He also competed at the Lime Rock Grand Prix, part of the SCCA Continental Championship. At the Grand Prix, Rutan spun and crashed his Lotus 32 Formula C car.

== Personal life ==
Rutan was born in Middletown, Connecticut, on 5 May 1931. After graduating high school he joined the United States Army in the Korean War conflict. Rutan enjoyed competitive sailing and worked in the construction industry. He retired in 2014 as a master craftsman at Centerbrook Architects & Planners and died on April 4, 2018, after a brief illness. He was buried at Fountain Hill Cemetery in Deep River, Connecticut.

== Motorsports results ==
=== SCCA National Championship Runoffs ===
Year	Track	Car	Engine	Class	Finish	Start	Status
1965	Daytona	Quantum IV	Saab	Formula C	10	16	Retired
1966	Riverside	Quantum IV	Saab	Formula C	4		Running
1967	Daytona	Quantum IV	Ford-Cosworth	Formula C	1	1	Running
1968	Riverside	Lotus 22	Ford-Cosworth	Formula C	2		Running
1969	Daytona	Tecno 69	Ford-Cosworth	Formula C	1	1	Running
