= McKee Mk.7 =

American sports prototype race car

The McKee Mk.7, also designated as the McKee Mk.VII, is a special purpose-built American sports prototype race car, designed and developed by Bob Nagel, and built to Group 7 specifications, for the Can-Am series, in 1967. It won a total of 2 races, and achieved 4 podium finishes. The configuration is a mid-engine, rear-wheel-drive layout. The chassis is constructed out of a tubular space frame, wrapped in a fiberglass body. The powerplant that was used varied, but included a Chevrolet small-block, a Chevrolet big-block, an Oldsmobile V8, and even a Ford FE big-block engine.
