= Continental Divide Raceways =

Race track in Castle Rock, Colorado

- Continental Divide Raceways Road Course (1959–1983)
- Location: Castle Rock, Colorado
- Coordinates: 39°20′0″N 104°53′05″W
- Broke ground: 1958
- Opened: 1959
- Closed: 1983
- Major events: NASCAR Winston West Series; Colorado Winston 200 (1982); USAC Championship Car; Rocky Mountain 150 (1968–1970); Trans-Am Series (1967–1968); United States Road Racing Championship (1963, 1965); USAC Road Racing Championship (1960–1961); SCCA National Sports Car Championship (1960)

Road Course (1959–1983)
- Surface: Asphalt
- Length: 2.802 mi (4.510 km)
- Turns: 10
- Race lap record: 1:48.700 ( (United States) Jerry Hansen/ (United States) Tony Adamowicz, McLaren M10A/Eagle Mk.5, 1969, F5000)

Oval (1959–1983)
- Length: 0.500 mi (0.805 km)
- Turns: 2

Continental Divide Raceways was a race track located in Castle Rock, Colorado, approximately 30 mi (48 km) south of Denver. Built in 1959, it featured a 2.802 mi (4.509 km) road course, 0.500 mi (0.805 km) oval, and 4,200 ft (1,300 m) drag strip. The land was intended to be used for a multi-sport spectator venue, but a racing complex was built after a hill climb was staged on the property.

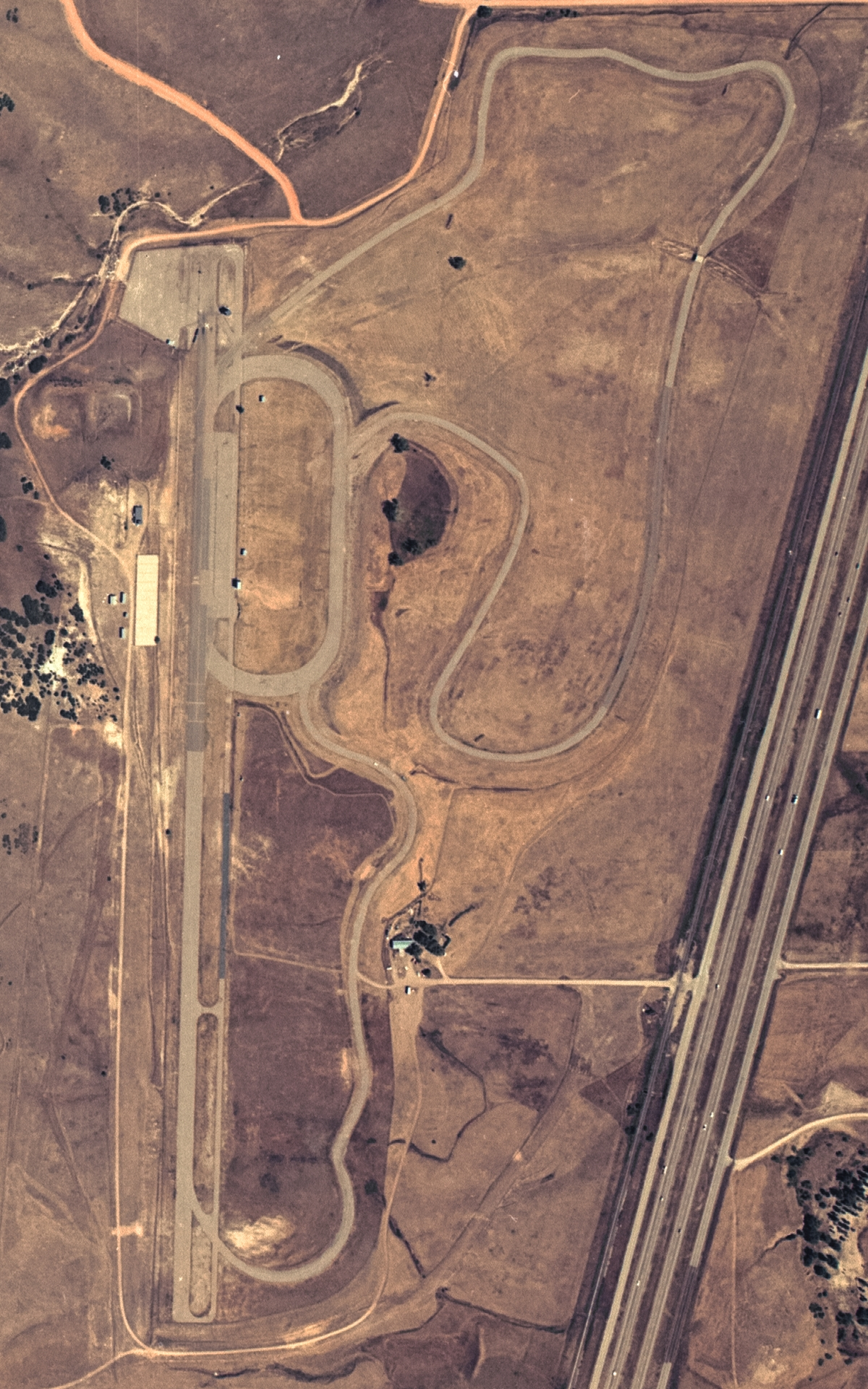
1978 aerial photo of Continental Divide Raceways

The track saw its most active time in the 1960s, hosting the USAC National Championship, major sports car races, and Trans-Am. On July 30, 1972, Evel Knievel successfully jumped 11 Dodge vehicles on his motorcycle at the track. The track closed in 1979 due to a fatal accident but reopened in 1981, holding a NASCAR Winston West Series stock car race in 1982 before being sold to real estate developers in 1983. There was a motocross track called CDR Tech Track on the property where an AMA Motocross National was held in 1981 and 1982.

== Lap records ==
The fastest official race lap records at the Continental Divide Raceways are listed as:

| Category | Time | Driver | Vehicle | Event |
Road Course (1959–1983): 2.802 mi (4.509 km)
| Formula 5000 | 1:48.700 | Jerry Hansen (Note: Both drivers took the same lap time independently.); Tony Adamowicz | McLaren M10A; Eagle Mk.5 | 1969 Castle Rock F5000 round |
| Sports car racing | 1:55.500 | Bud Morley | McLaren-Elva Mk II | 1967 Continental Divide SCCA Regional race |

== Race results ==
=== USAC Champ Car "Rocky Mountain 150" ===
| Year | Date | Driver | Team | Car |
|---|---|---|---|---|
| 1968 | July 7 | (United States) A. J. Foyt | Sheraton-Thompson | Coyote-Ford |
| 1969 | July 6 | (United States) Gordon Johncock | Gilmore Broadcasting | Eagle-Ford |
| 1970 | June 28 | (United States) Mario Andretti | STP Oil Treatment | McNamara-Ford |

=== Sports car races ===
| Year | Date | Driver(s) | Team | Car | Championship |
|---|---|---|---|---|---|
| 1960 | June 26 | (United States) Carroll Shelby | Meister Brauser | Scarab-Chevrolet | USAC Road Racing Championship |
| 1960 | July 17 | (United States) Bob Holbert | | Porsche 718 RSK | SCCA National Sports Car Championship |
| 1961 | July 2 | (United Kingdom) Ken Miles | Crandall Industries Incorporated | Porsche 718 RSK | USAC Road Racing Championship |
| 1963 | August 18 | (United States) Augie Pabst | Meister Brauser | Scarab-Chevrolet | United States Road Racing Championship |
| 1965 | August 15 | (United States) Hap Sharp | Chaparral Cars Inc. | Chaparral 2A-Chevrolet | United States Road Racing Championship |

=== Trans-Am ===
| Year | Date | Driver | Car |
|---|---|---|---|
| 1967 | August 27 | (United States) Jerry Titus | Ford Mustang |
| 1968 | August 25 | (United States) Mark Donohue | Chevrolet Camaro |
