= Tony Adamowicz =

American racing driver

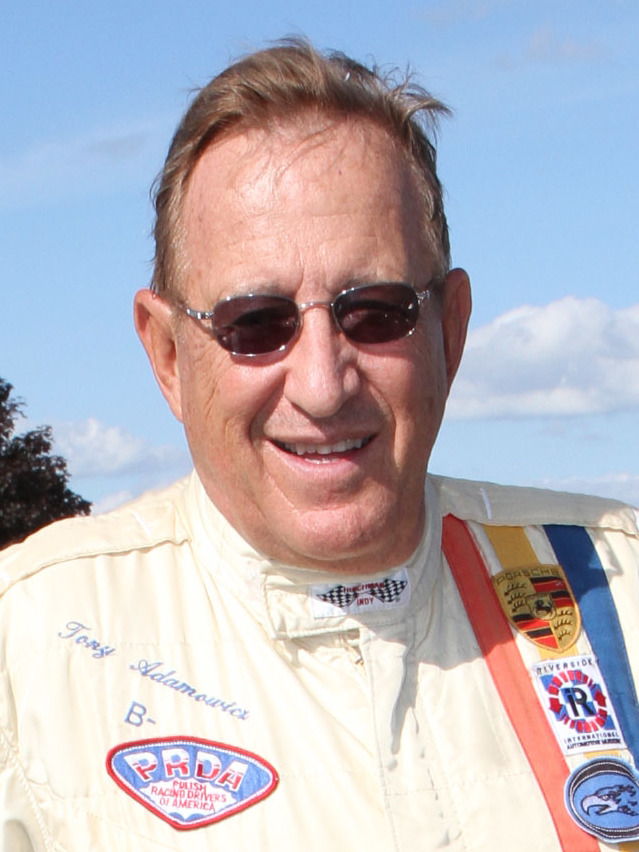
- Adamowicz at Watkins Glen International in 2010
- Born: 2 May 1941; Moriah, New York
- Died: 10 October 2016 (aged 75); Costa Mesa, California

Formula One World Championship career
- Nationality: USA
- Active years: 1971
- Team: Non-works Lola
- Entries: 1
- Championships: 0
- Wins: 0
- Podiums: 0
- Career points: 0
- Pole positions: 0
- Fastest laps: 0
- First entry: 1971 Questor Grand Prix
- Last entry: 1971 Questor Grand Prix

Anthony Peter Adamowicz (May 2, 1941 – October 10, 2016) was an American racing driver, active from 1963 until his death. He won the Under 2-Liter class of the 1968 Trans-Am Championship and the 1969 SCCA Continental Championship.

== Early life ==
Adamowicz was born in 1941 to Polish immigrants in Moriah, New York, and raised in Port Henry, New York. He began his career with the US Army and worked as a communications staffer at the White House during the late 1950s and 1960s.

== Racing career ==
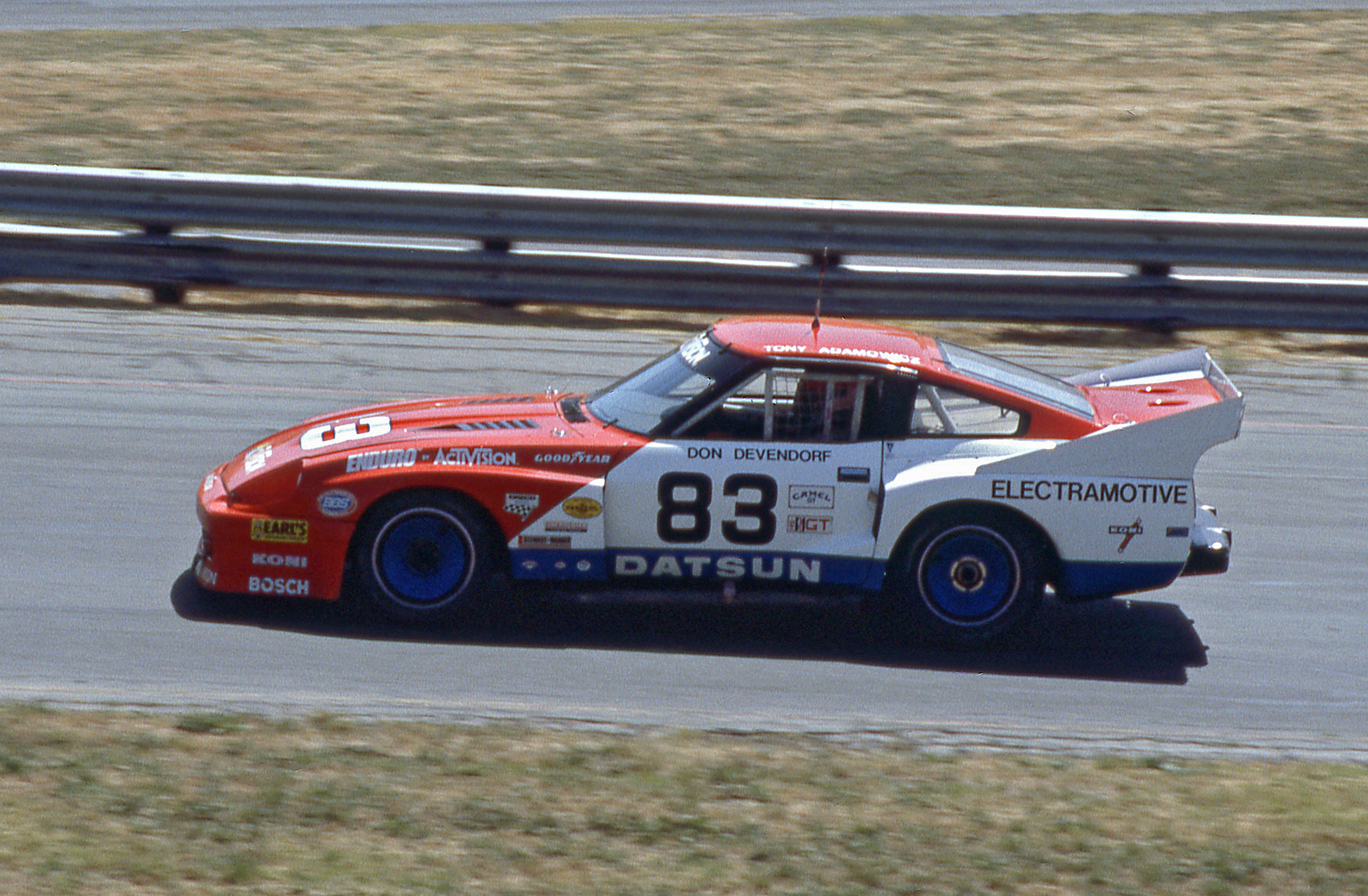
The Datsun 280ZX Turbo that Tony Adamowicz drove to the 1983 IMSA GTO Championship.

It was during his time in Washington, D.C., that Adamowicz took up auto racing. He started racing with a Volvo PV 544 in neighbouring Maryland in 1963. He later contested the Under 2-Liter class of the 1968 Trans-Am Championship in a Porsche 911, then raced in the Can-Am Series and Formula A/Formula 5000, winning the 1969 SCCA Continental Championship. He had an opportunity to race in the 1970 Indianapolis 500, but during the first lap of his qualifying attempt in his Eagle-Offy the yellow light was shown and Adamowicz slowed. However, the yellow was an error and Adamowicz was ordered to continue with the other 3 laps. The first lap, 6 mph (9.7 km/h) slower than his others, dragged down his average to a point where he was bumped from the field. He got in another car but crashed in practice before having a chance to requalify.

Adamowicz returned to sports cars, racing TransAm in an Autodynamics Dodge Challenger as teammate to Sam Posey, achieving second place in the 1971 24 Hours of Daytona in a Ferrari 512S, shared with Ronnie Bucknum, and third place in the 1971 24 Hours of Le Mans with Sam Posey in a 512M Also in September 1971 Adamowicz won 12 Horas Marlboro in Yahuarcocha Ecuador in a Ferrari 512S. After the decline of the Can Am and F5000 formulas, he moved to IMSA series and won the 1979 GTU championship in an Electramotive Nissan 280ZX and 1982 GTO championship in an Electramotive 280ZX-T.

Adamowicz returned to prototypes in 1984 but had little success at that level and retired after the 1989 24 Hours of Daytona. He then competed in select vintage races in the same 1969-model Eagle racing car in which he won the 1969 SCCA Continental Championship. The car is now owned by Doug Magnon, the founder of the Riverside International Automotive Museum, and prepared by mechanic Bill Losee. It bears the identical livery it carried back in 1969. As the Eagle had been parked immediately after the 1969 season, and was not run again until following its restoration in 2008, Adamowicz remained the only driver to actually have driven this car.

Adamowicz was inducted into the National Polish-American Sports Hall of Fame in 2016.

== Personal life and death ==
Early in 2015, Adamowicz was diagnosed with brain cancer, glioblastoma. He died on October 10, 2016, at the age of 75.

== Complete Formula One Non-Championship results ==
(key)

Year	Entrant	Chassis	Engine	1	2	3	4	5	6	7	8
1971	American Racing Associates	Lola T192	Chevrolet 5.0 V8	ARG	ROC	QUE; 19	SPR	INT	RIN	OUL	VIC

== Complete 24 Hours of Le Mans results ==
Year	Team	Co-drivers	Car	Class	Laps	Pos.	Class pos.
1970	(United States) North American Racing Team	(United States) Chuck Parsons	Ferrari 312P Coupé	P 3.0	281	NC	NC
1971	(United States) North American Racing Team	(United States) Sam Posey	Ferrari 512M	S 5.0	366	3rd	3rd
1972	(United States) North American Racing Team	(United States) Sam Posey	Ferrari 365 GTB/4	GTS 5.0	304	6th	2nd
1984	(United States) Jaguar Group 44	(France) Claude Ballot-Léna (United Kingdom) John Watson	Jaguar XJR-5	IMSA; GTP	212	DNF	DNF
