= Sam Posey =

American racing driver, author, artist, architect (born 1944)

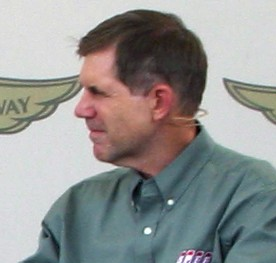
- Posey at Indianapolis Motor Speedway in 2006
- Nationality: (United States) American
- Born: May 26, 1944 (age 82) New York City, New York, U.S.
Sam Posey
Formula One World Championship career
- Active years: 1971–1972
- Team: Surtees inc. non-works
- Entries: 2
- Championships: 0
- Wins: 0
- Podiums: 0
- Career points: 0
- Pole positions: 0
- Fastest laps: 0
- First entry: 1971 United States Grand Prix
- Last entry: 1972 United States Grand Prix
Sam Posey
Champ Car career
- 13 races run over 4 years
- Years active: 1969-1974
- Best finish: 17th (1972)
- First race: 1969 Indy 200 (IRP)
- Last race: 1974 Phoenix 150 (Phoenix)
Wins	Podiums	Poles
0	1	0
NASCAR Cup Series career
- 1 race run over 1 year
- First race: 1970 Motor Trend 500 (Riverside)
Wins	Top tens	Poles
0	0	0

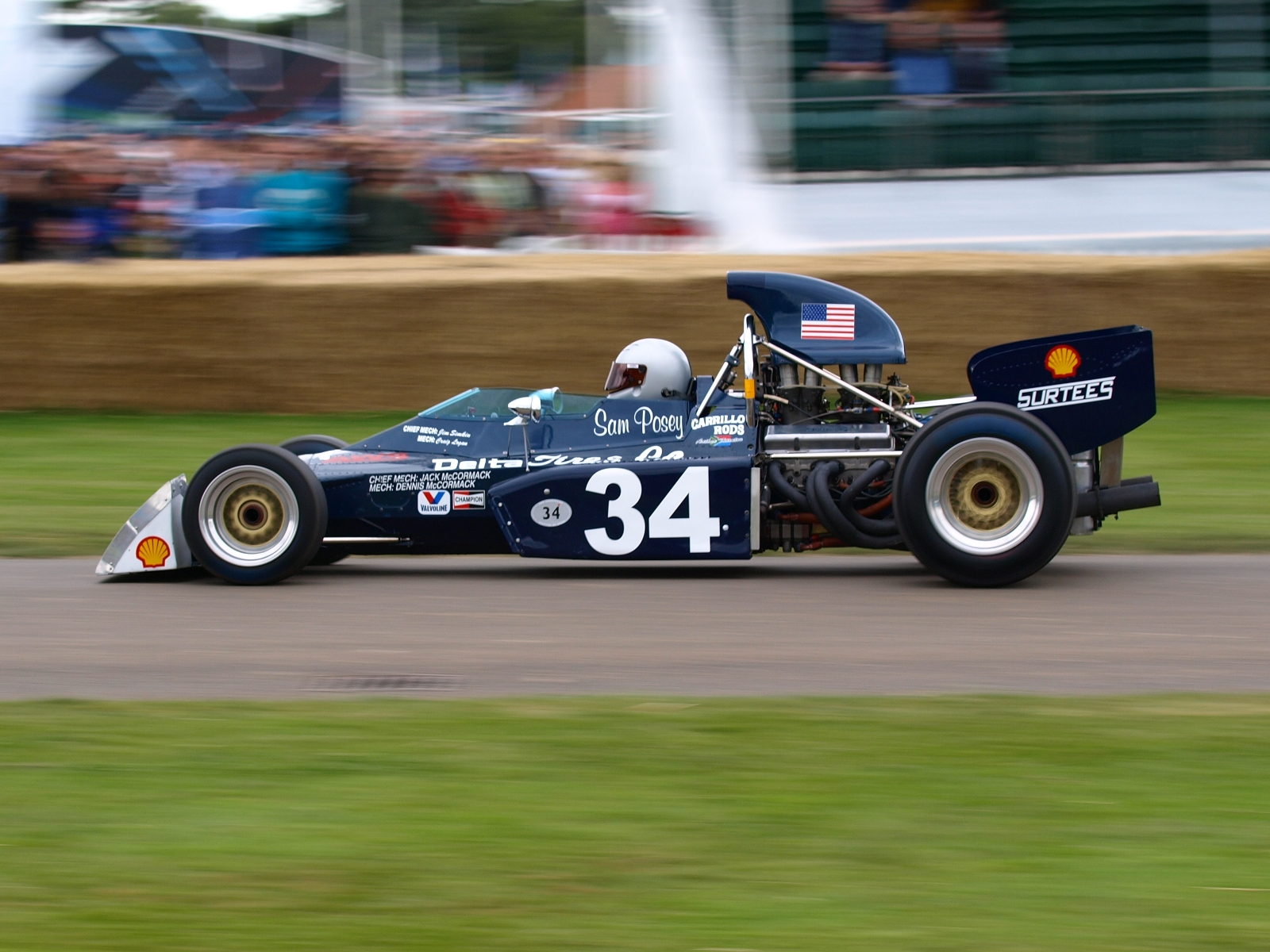
Posey's Surtees TS9B at the 2008 Goodwood Festival of Speed

Samuel Felton Posey (born May 26, 1944) is an American former racing driver and sports broadcast journalist.

== Early life and driving career ==
Posey's father, Lt. (j.g.) Samuel Felton Posey, was killed in the Battle of Okinawa when a kamikaze struck his ship, the USS Henrico. His remains were never recovered. Posey grew up in Sharon, CT on his grandfather's estate near Lime Rock Park. Posey was bought a Mercedes-Benz 300 SL when he was 14 years old, and practiced driving the car around his family farm. He received his first racing lessons from neighbor John Fitch. Posey started as an amateur sports car racer, and graduated to the Can-Am, in a car designed and funded by himself in collaboration with engineer friend Ray Caldwell. Posey raced the Sunoco Camaro for Roger Penske in 1968 in the Trans-Am Series. Chevrolet won the championship based on the Penske team effort. Mark Donohue was the lead driver and he won a remarkable ten of 13 races. Posey's first race was at Bridgehampton where he finished third. Other finishes were: Meadowdale, third; St Jovite, third; Bryar, sixth; Watkins Glen, second which was the only race that Donohue was beaten by a Camaro in 1968. Posey's car was the same Sunoco Blue with yellow lettering as Donohue. Posey sported a yellow spoiler and Donohue had a red spoiler.

In 1969, Posey won the Lime Rock Trans-Am in a factory Ford Mustang. In 1970, he was the driver for Ray Caldwell's factory-backed Autodynamics Dodge Challenger in Trans-Am, racing against Parnelli Jones, Dan Gurney, Mark Donohue and Jim Hall in what most racing historians regard as the greatest season of professional road racing in US history. Posey also raced in the USAC Championship Car series in the 1969 and 1972-1974 seasons, with 13 career starts, including the 1972 Indianapolis 500. Posey's entry was disqualified from the 1973 Indianapolis 500 after USAC Technical Director Frank DelRoy discovered Posey's team had disguised their already qualified car as another vehicle so that Posey could make another qualifying attempt to try to avoid being bumped from the field. He finished in the top-ten eight times, with his best finish in third position in 1969 at the Kent road course. He was the team driver for Caldwell's Can-Am racer which featured monocoque aluminum construction in two parallel longitudinal space frames, with solid front and rear axles.

As an endurance racer, Posey appeared at the 24 Hours of Le Mans ten times (1966, 1969–1973, and 1975–1978) and finished in the top-ten five times. His best finish was third position during the 1971 competition in which he drove the Ferrari 512M. He won the 1975 12 Hours of Sebring, teaming with three other drivers.

Posey participated in two Formula One world championship events, the 1971 and 1972 United States Grand Prix, retiring from the first and finishing 12th in the second, thus not scoring any championship points. He drove Surtees cars on both occasions, but only the first was a works-entered car.

Posey also competed in a single event in the NASCAR Grand National Series (now known as the NASCAR Cup Series), the first race of the 1970 season, held on the Riverside International Raceway road course in Riverside, California.

== Racing analyst ==
=== ABC ===
Posey went on to become an auto racing commentator for ABC Sports. Posey debuted on ABC for the Indianapolis 500 in 1974, serving as analyst. In subsequent years, he served as a pit reporter but would fill in as analyst when regular analyst Jackie Stewart was unavailable as Posey was second choice as analyst. Posey returned to the booth starting in 1982 as Stewart reduced his workload. By 1986, Stewart had left and Posey was their first choice as analyst.

While commentating the 1986 Indianapolis 500, as there was a yellow flag out very near the end of the race, Posey used a two-way radio to ask an impromptu question to race leader Kevin Cogan. Posey was trying to ask Cogan about his thoughts in leading the Indianapolis 500 at this stage. Cogan tried to stave off the conversation once, but Posey persisted a second time, at which time Cogan politely replied to Posey that he was "a little busy now," but would talk to him later. Posey understood the circumstances and told the audience if that were he, "I wouldn't want to talk to me either." Moments later, on a restart with two laps remaining, Bobby Rahal jumped Cogan on the restart and went on to win.

Along with the Indy 500, Posey's ABC Sports duties included commentary for the CART/PPG Indy Car World Series with Paul Page and Bobby Unser, lasting through 1995. Posey also appeared on selected NASCAR broadcasts on ABC. The three-man booth of Page, Posey, and Unser was a fixture of Indy car racing during the late 1980s and early 1990s. Posey and Bobby Unser were known to engage in friendly, but sometimes heated exchanges on-air. The friction reached a level such that beginning in 1993 at the Indy 500, Unser moved out of the booth and began reporting from a remote location in turn two.

In 1989, Posey was brought in as part of the ABC Sports broadcast team covering the 1989 Tour de France. Many people were surprised by Posey's knowledge and genuine enthusiasm for the sport. ABC would bring him back as the lead anchor for the 1990 and 1991 races. Posey also worked as the play-by-play announcer for luge during ABC's coverage of the 1984 Winter Olympics in Sarajevo and the 1988 Winter Olympics in Calgary.

=== Speedvision ===
Posey moved to Speedvision (later known as SPEED) in 1996, covering various races namely sports car racing and Formula One. He also did essay work for the coverage of the Tour de France on OLN/Versus (later known as NBCSN), serving as the "Race Historian", and wrote for Road & Track magazine.

== Recent years ==
Posey is also the author of Playing With Trains, a book on model railroading published by Random House and his layout (the Colorado Midland) was featured in the February 1995 issue of Model Railroader Magazine, and The Mudge Pond Express, an autobiography which centers around his personal racing career and love of the sport.

An accomplished artist, painter and architect, in 1966 he earned his B.F.A. in painting from Rhode Island School of Design. Since 1995, Posey suffers from Parkinson's disease, which has attenuated his activities in recent years.

Posey was the voice for the pre-race build-up montage slotted between the Mercedes-Benz Pre-Race Show and the actual race coverage for each Formula 1 race shown on the Speed Channel. Posey also comments on recent Formula 1 races and the championship in a segment called "Posey's Perspective" as part of the Formula 1 Debrief show (also featuring Bob Varsha, David Hobbs, Steve Matchett, and Will Buxton) on the Speed Channel. Posey narrated F1 montages for the NBC Sports Network from 2013 to 2017.

== Awards ==
Posey was inducted into the Motorsports Hall of Fame of America in 2016.

== Tribute ==
In 2013, the front straight at Lime Rock Park was renamed the Sam Posey Straight.

== Complete Formula One World Championship results ==
(key)

Year	Entrant	Chassis	Engine	1	2	3	4	5	6	7	8	9	10	11	12	WDC	Points
1971	Team Surtees	Surtees TS9	Cosworth V8	RSA	ESP	MON	NED	FRA	GBR	GER	AUT	ITA	CAN	USA; Ret		NC	0
1972	Champcarr Inc.	Surtees TS9B	Cosworth V8	ARG	RSA	ESP	MON	BEL	FRA	GBR	GER	AUT	ITA	CAN	USA; 12	NC	0

== Complete Indianapolis 500 results ==
Year	Chassis	Engine	Start	Finish	Team	Notes
1969			–	–		Refused entry due to experience
1970			–	–		Failed to qualify
1971	Eagle	Offy	–	–	Jerry Grant Racing	Bumped
1972	Eagle	Offy	7	5	Champ Carr Inc.	
1973	Eagle	Offy	–	–	Champ Carr Inc.	Bumped

== Complete 24 Hours of Le Mans results ==
Year	Team	Co-drivers	Car	Class	Laps	Pos.	Class pos.
1966	(Italy) Prototipi Bizzarrini	(Italy) Massimo Natili	Bizzarrini P538 Super America	P +5.0	39	DSQ	DSQ
1969	(United States) North American Racing Team	(Italy) Teodoro Zeccoli	Ferrari 275LM	S 5.0	329	8th	4th
1970	(United States) North American Racing Team	(United States) Ronnie Bucknum	Ferrari 512S	S 5.0	313	4th	3rd
1971	(United States) North American Racing Team	(United States) Tony Adamowicz	Ferrari 512M	S 5.0	366	3rd	3rd
1972	(United States) North American Racing Team	(United States) Tony Adamowicz	Ferrari 365 GTB/4	GTS 5.0	304	6th	2nd
1973	(United States) North American Racing Team	(United States) Milt Minter	Ferrari 365 GTB/4	GTS 5.0	254	DNF	DNF
1975	(France) Hervé Poulain	(France) Jean Guichet (France) Hervé Poulain	BMW 3.0 CSL	TS	73	DNF	DNF
1976	(Germany) BMW Motorsport GmbH (Germany) Alpina-Faltz	(Belgium) Baron Hughes de Fierlandt (Germany) Harald Grohs	BMW 3.0 CSL	Gr.5; SP	299	10th	4th
1977	(United States) Grand Touring Cars Inc.	(France) Michel Leclère	Mirage M8-Renault	Gr.6; S 3.0	58	DNF	DNF
1978	(United States) Grand Touring Cars Inc.	(France) Michel Leclère	Mirage M9-Renault	Gr. 6 S 3.0	33	DNF	DNF
1978	(United States) Grand Touring Cars Inc.	(France) Jacques Laffite (Australia) Vern Schuppan	Mirage M9-Renault	Gr.6; S 3.0	293	10th	5th
