= Formula C (SCCA) =

Predecessor to the Formula Continental SCCA racing class

Formula C was an open wheeled SCCA racing class originating in the mid-1960s, derived from the failed Formula Junior class. Formula C cars were very similar to Formula Juniors; Formula B was a similar class with uprated 1600 cc engines. Formula C cars were limited to 1100 cc engines. In the SCCA today, Formula Continental is the direct descendant of Formula C.

== Regulations ==
The 1965 SCCA General Competition Rules define the Formula SCCA Class C (commonly referred to as Formula C) rules as follows:

1. Single seat, four open-wheeled racing car with firewall, floor and safety equipment conforming with the SCCA General Competition Rules.
2. Engine displacement below or equal to 1100cc.
3. Minimum weight in full running condition 750 pounds.
4. Cars must use pump fuel only.
5. Cars must be equipped with on-board self starter controlled by the driver in normal driving position.
6. The driver's seat must be capable of being entered without the removal or manipulation of any part or panel.
7. A double braking system operated by one pedal is compulsory. The pedal shall normally control the four wheels. In case of leakage at any point of the piping or any failure in the braking transmission system, the brake pedal must continue to actuate at least two wheels on the same axle.
8. Supercharging devices are not permitted.
9. Reverse gear is mandatory (as of 1966).

== Formula C at the SCCA National Championship Runoffs ==
| Year | Winner | Car | Engine |
|---|---|---|---|
| 1965 | (United States) Larry Skeels | Cooper | BMC |
| 1966 | (Italy) Nick Dioguardi | Brabham | |
| 1967 | (United States) Bill Rutan | Quantum | Ford |
| 1968 | (United States) Mike Campbell | Forsgrini Mk. 10 | Ford |
| 1969 | (United States) Bill Rutan | Tecno | Ford |
| 1970 | (United States) Michael Rand | Brabham BT21 | Ford |
| 1971 | (United States) Harry Reynolds | Brabham BT29 | Ford |
| 1972 | (United States) Harry Reynolds | Brabham BT29 | Ford |
| 1973 | (United States) Michael Gilbert | Lotus 41 | Ford |
| 1974 | (United States) Bill Anspach | Chevron B17 | Ford |
| 1975 | (United States) Dirk Wrightson | Brabham BT29 | Ford |
| 1976 | (United States) Michael Gilbert | GRD 375/6 | Ford |
| 1977 | (United States) Bill Anspach | Chevron B34 | Ford |
| 1978 | (United States) Jim Trueman | March | |
