= 1998 IMSA GT Championship =

28th season of the racing series organized by IMSA

Seasons
- ← 1997 1999 (ALMS) →

The 1998 Professional SportsCar Racing Championship season was the 28th season of the IMSA GT Championship, the final one of the original IMSA. It consisted of an open-cockpit World Sports Car (WSC) class of prototypes and Grand Tourer-style racing cars divided into GT1, GT2, and GT3 classes. It began March 22, 1998, and ended October 25, 1998, after eight rounds.

The IMSA GT Championship was replaced by the American Le Mans Series in 1999, which was supported by the Automobile Club de l'Ouest (ACO). This series, based on the 24 Hours of Le Mans, was initially previewed during the 1998 season with the running of the inaugural Petit Le Mans. Professional SportsCar Racing remained as the series organizer.

Of note is the lack of the 24 Hours of Daytona and the Six Hours of Watkins Glen, both of which were acquired by the revived SCCA United States Road Racing Championship.

== Schedule ==
Rnd	Race	Length	Class	Circuit	Location	Date
1	(United States) Superflo 12 Hours of Sebring	12 Hours	Both	Sebring International Raceway	Sebring, Florida	March 22
2	(United States) Toshiba Nevada Grand Prix	3 Hours 45 Minutes	Both	Las Vegas Motor Speedway	Las Vegas, Nevada	April 26
3	(United States) The Dodge Dealers Grand Prix^{†}	1 Hour 45 Minutes	WSC	Lime Rock Park	Lakeville, Connecticut	May 25
3	(United States) The Dodge Dealers Grand Prix^{†}	1 Hour 45 Minutes	GT	Lime Rock Park	Lakeville, Connecticut	May 25
4	(United States) Sports Car Grand Prix of Road Atlanta	3 Hours 45 Minutes	Both	Road Atlanta	Braselton, Georgia	June 21
5	(Canada) Mosport Festival	2 Hours 45 Minutes	Both	Mosport	Bowmanville, Ontario	August 9
6	(United States) NAPA Sebring Classic	3 Hours	Both	Sebring International Raceway	Sebring, Florida	September 20
7	(United States) Petit Le Mans	10 Hours or 1000 Miles	Both	Road Atlanta	Braselton, Georgia	October 10
8	(United States) Visa Sports Car Championships	2 Hours 30 Minutes	Both	Laguna Seca Raceway	Monterey, California	October 25

† - Two separate races were held for Lime Rock: One for WSC, one for the GT classes.

Daytona and Watkins Glen move to the new United States Road Racing Championship for 1998. Sears Point Raceway and Pikes Peak International Raceway were also dropped from the calendar. Petit Le Mans that also ran to ACO regulations was also added to the calendar.

== Entry list ==
=== WSC ===
Team	Chassis	Engine	Tyre	No.	Drivers	Rnds.
(Germany) BMW Motorsport (Germany) Schnitzer Motorsport	Riley & Scott Mk III	BMW 4.0 L V8	M	2	(United States) Bill Auberlen	7*, 8
(Germany) BMW Motorsport (Germany) Schnitzer Motorsport	Riley & Scott Mk III	BMW 4.0 L V8	M	2	(Belgium) Didier de Radiguès	7*, 8
(Germany) BMW Motorsport (Germany) Schnitzer Motorsport	Riley & Scott Mk III	BMW 4.0 L V8	M	2	(Italy) Pierluigi Martini	7*
(Germany) BMW Motorsport (Germany) Schnitzer Motorsport	Riley & Scott Mk III	BMW 4.0 L V8	M	3	(Germany) Hans-Joachim Stuck	7*, 8
(Germany) BMW Motorsport (Germany) Schnitzer Motorsport	Riley & Scott Mk III	BMW 4.0 L V8	M	3	(United Kingdom) Steve Soper	7*, 8
(Germany) BMW Motorsport (Germany) Schnitzer Motorsport	Riley & Scott Mk III	BMW 4.0 L V8	M	3	(Denmark) Tom Kristensen	7*
(United States) Doyle-Risi Racing	Ferrari 333 SP	Ferrari F310E 4.0 L V12	P	7	(South Africa) Wayne Taylor	All
(United States) Doyle-Risi Racing	Ferrari 333 SP	Ferrari F310E 4.0 L V12	P	7	(Belgium) Eric van de Poele	All
(United States) Doyle-Risi Racing	Ferrari 333 SP	Ferrari F310E 4.0 L V12	P	7	(Spain) Fermín Vélez	1
(United States) Doyle-Risi Racing	Ferrari 333 SP	Ferrari F310E 4.0 L V12	P	7	(France) Emmanuel Collard	7
(United States) Transatlantic Racing Services	Riley & Scott Mk III	Ford 5.0 L V8	D	8	(United States) Scott Schubot	1, 3–4, 6-8
(United States) Transatlantic Racing Services	Riley & Scott Mk III	Ford 5.0 L V8	D	8	(United States) Henry Camferdam	1, 3–4, 6-8
(United States) Transatlantic Racing Services	Riley & Scott Mk III	Ford 5.0 L V8	D	8	(United States) Johnny O'Connell	1
(United States) Transatlantic Racing Services	Riley & Scott Mk III	Ford 5.0 L V8	D	8	(United States) Butch Leitzinger	7
(United States) Genesis Racing	Kudzu DG-2	Buick 3.0 L V6	G	11	(United States) Mark Neuhaus	4
(United States) Genesis Racing	Kudzu DG-2	Buick 3.0 L V6	G	11	(United Kingdom) Michael DeFontes	4
(United States) Genesis Racing	Hawk MD3R	Chevrolet 6.0 L V8	G	12	(United States) Chuck Goldsborough	1, 4
(United States) Genesis Racing	Hawk MD3R	Chevrolet 6.0 L V8	G	12	(United States) Rick Fairbanks	1, 4
(United States) Genesis Racing	Hawk MD3R	Chevrolet 6.0 L V8	G	12	(United States) Mark Neuhaus	1
(United States) Genesis Racing	Hawk MD3R	Chevrolet 6.0 L V8	G	12	(United Kingdom) Michael DeFontes	1
(United States) Dyson Racing	Riley & Scott Mk III	Ford 5.0 L V8	G	16	(United States) Butch Leitzinger	1, 3–6, 8
(United States) Dyson Racing	Riley & Scott Mk III	Ford 5.0 L V8	G	16	(United Kingdom) James Weaver	1, 3–6, 8
(United States) Dyson Racing	Riley & Scott Mk III	Ford 5.0 L V8	G	16	(United States) Elliott Forbes-Robinson	1
(United States) Dyson Racing	Riley & Scott Mk III	Ford 5.0 L V8	G	20	(United States) Elliott Forbes-Robinson	1, 3–6, 8
(United States) Dyson Racing	Riley & Scott Mk III	Ford 5.0 L V8	G	20	(United States) Dorsey Schroeder	1, 3–6, 8
(United States) Dyson Racing	Riley & Scott Mk III	Ford 5.0 L V8	G	20	(United States) Butch Leitzinger	1
(United States) Dyson Racing	Riley & Scott Mk III	Ford 5.0 L V8	G	20	(United Kingdom) James Weaver	1
(United States) Davin Racing	Kudzu DG-2	Buick 3.0 L V6	?	19	(United States) Edd Davin	1*
(United States) Davin Racing	Kudzu DG-2	Buick 3.0 L V6	?	19	(United States) A.J. Smith	1*
(United States) Davin Racing	Kudzu DG-2	Buick 3.0 L V6	?	19	(United States) Mark Montgomery	1*
(France) Solution F	Riley & Scott Mk III	Ford 5.0 L V8	P	21	(France) Philippe Gache	7
(France) Solution F	Riley & Scott Mk III	Ford 5.0 L V8	P	21	(France) Anthony Beltoise	7
(France) Solution F	Riley & Scott Mk III	Ford 5.0 L V8	P	21	(France) Jérôme Policand	7
(United States) Doran Enterprises, Inc. (United States) MOMO Doran Racing	Ferrari 333 SP	Ferrari F310E 4.0 L V12	Y	27 30	(Belgium) Didier Theys	1, 3, 5, 7–8
(United States) Doran Enterprises, Inc. (United States) MOMO Doran Racing	Ferrari 333 SP	Ferrari F310E 4.0 L V12	Y	27 30	(Italy) Mauro Baldi	1, 7
(United States) Doran Enterprises, Inc. (United States) MOMO Doran Racing	Ferrari 333 SP	Ferrari F310E 4.0 L V12	Y	27 30	(Italy) Gianpiero Moretti	1
(United States) Doran Enterprises, Inc. (United States) MOMO Doran Racing	Ferrari 333 SP	Ferrari F310E 4.0 L V12	Y	27 30	(Switzerland) Fredy Lienhard	3, 5, 7–8
(United States) Intersport Racing	Riley & Scott Mk III	Ford 5.0 L V8	G	28	(United States) Jon Field	All
(United States) Intersport Racing	Riley & Scott Mk III	Ford 5.0 L V8	G	28	(United States) Butch Brickell	1–2, 6
(United States) Intersport Racing	Riley & Scott Mk III	Ford 5.0 L V8	G	28	(United States) Rick Sutherland	1–2, 8
(United States) Intersport Racing	Riley & Scott Mk III	Ford 5.0 L V8	G	28	(United States) Sam Brown	3
(United States) Intersport Racing	Riley & Scott Mk III	Ford 5.0 L V8	G	28	(United States) Joaquin DeSoto	4, 7
(United States) Intersport Racing	Riley & Scott Mk III	Ford 5.0 L V8	G	28	(United States) Richard Geck	4
(United States) Intersport Racing	Riley & Scott Mk III	Ford 5.0 L V8	G	28	(United States) Jacek Mucha	5–6
(United States) Intersport Racing	Riley & Scott Mk III	Ford 5.0 L V8	G	28	(United States) John Mirro	7
(United States) Intersport Racing	Riley & Scott Mk III	Ford 5.0 L V8	G	28	(United States) Jeret Schroeder	7
(United States) Intersport Racing	Spice SC95 (1-2) Riley & Scott Mk III (7-8)	Oldsmobile Aurora 4.0 L V8 (1-2) Ford 5.0 L V8 (7-8)	G	29 59	(United States) Joaquin DeSoto	1–2
(United States) Intersport Racing	Spice SC95 (1-2) Riley & Scott Mk III (7-8)	Oldsmobile Aurora 4.0 L V8 (1-2) Ford 5.0 L V8 (7-8)	G	29 59	(United States) John Mirro	1–2
(United States) Intersport Racing	Spice SC95 (1-2) Riley & Scott Mk III (7-8)	Oldsmobile Aurora 4.0 L V8 (1-2) Ford 5.0 L V8 (7-8)	G	29 59	(United States) Simon Gregg	1, 7
(United States) Intersport Racing	Spice SC95 (1-2) Riley & Scott Mk III (7-8)	Oldsmobile Aurora 4.0 L V8 (1-2) Ford 5.0 L V8 (7-8)	G	29 59	(United States) Alex Smith	1
(United States) Intersport Racing	Spice SC95 (1-2) Riley & Scott Mk III (7-8)	Oldsmobile Aurora 4.0 L V8 (1-2) Ford 5.0 L V8 (7-8)	G	29 59	(United States) Ken Dromm	7–8
(United States) Intersport Racing	Spice SC95 (1-2) Riley & Scott Mk III (7-8)	Oldsmobile Aurora 4.0 L V8 (1-2) Ford 5.0 L V8 (7-8)	G	29 59	(United States) Jacek Mucha	7–8
(United States) Matthews-Colucci Racing	Riley & Scott Mk III	Ford 5.0 L V8	P	36	(United States) Jim Matthews	3–4, 6
(United States) Matthews-Colucci Racing	Riley & Scott Mk III	Ford 5.0 L V8	P	36	(United States) Bill Dollahite	3
(United States) Matthews-Colucci Racing	Riley & Scott Mk III	Ford 5.0 L V8	P	36	(United States) Barry Waddell	4
(United States) Matthews-Colucci Racing	Riley & Scott Mk III	Ford 5.0 L V8	P	36	(United States) David Murry	5
(United States) Matthews-Colucci Racing	Riley & Scott Mk III	Ford 5.0 L V8	P	39	(United States) David Murry	1–4, 7
(United States) Matthews-Colucci Racing	Riley & Scott Mk III	Ford 5.0 L V8	P	39	(United States) Jim Matthews	1–2, 7
(United States) Matthews-Colucci Racing	Riley & Scott Mk III	Ford 5.0 L V8	P	39	(United States) Hurley Haywood	1
(United States) Matthews-Colucci Racing	Riley & Scott Mk III	Ford 5.0 L V8	P	39	(United Kingdom) Derek Bell	1
(United States) Matthews-Colucci Racing	Riley & Scott Mk III	Ford 5.0 L V8	P	39	(United States) Dorsey Schroeder	2
(United States) Matthews-Colucci Racing	Riley & Scott Mk III	Ford 5.0 L V8	P	39	(United States) Tom Kendall	3
(United States) Matthews-Colucci Racing	Riley & Scott Mk III	Ford 5.0 L V8	P	39	(Sweden) Stefan Johansson	4
(United States) Fantasy Junction	Cannibal	Chevrolet 6.0 L V8	?	51	(United States) Bruce Trenery	1*
(United States) Fantasy Junction	Cannibal	Chevrolet 6.0 L V8	?	51	(United States) Spencer Trenery	1*
(United States) Fantasy Junction	Cannibal	Chevrolet 6.0 L V8	?	51	(United Kingdom) Grahame Bryant	1*
(United States) Kopf Race Products	Keiler KII	Ford 5.0 L V8	G	60	(United States) Shane Donley	2, 8
(United States) Kopf Race Products	Keiler KII	Ford 5.0 L V8	G	60	(United States) Kris Wilson	2, 8
(United States) Downing Atlanta	Kudzu DLM	Mazda R26B 2.6 L 4-Rotor	G	62	(United States) Paul Debban	4
(United States) Downing Atlanta	Kudzu DLM	Mazda R26B 2.6 L 4-Rotor	G	62	(United States) Dennis Spencer	4
(United States) Downing Atlanta	Kudzu DLM (1-7) Kudzu DLY (8)	Mazda 2.0 L 3-Rotor (1) Mazda R26B 2.6 L 4-Rotor (2-8)	G	63	(United States) Jim Downing	All
(United States) Downing Atlanta	Kudzu DLM (1-7) Kudzu DLY (8)	Mazda 2.0 L 3-Rotor (1) Mazda R26B 2.6 L 4-Rotor (2-8)	G	63	(Japan) Yojiro Terada	1, 7
(United States) Downing Atlanta	Kudzu DLM (1-7) Kudzu DLY (8)	Mazda 2.0 L 3-Rotor (1) Mazda R26B 2.6 L 4-Rotor (2-8)	G	63	(United States) Jim Pace	1
(United States) Downing Atlanta	Kudzu DLM (1-7) Kudzu DLY (8)	Mazda 2.0 L 3-Rotor (1) Mazda R26B 2.6 L 4-Rotor (2-8)	G	63	(United States) Chris Ronson	2
(United States) Downing Atlanta	Kudzu DLM (1-7) Kudzu DLY (8)	Mazda 2.0 L 3-Rotor (1) Mazda R26B 2.6 L 4-Rotor (2-8)	G	63	(United States) Howard Katz	3–4, 7
(United States) Downing Atlanta	Kudzu DLM (1-7) Kudzu DLY (8)	Mazda 2.0 L 3-Rotor (1) Mazda R26B 2.6 L 4-Rotor (2-8)	G	63	(United States) A.J. Smith	5
(United States) Downing Atlanta	Kudzu DLM (1-7) Kudzu DLY (8)	Mazda 2.0 L 3-Rotor (1) Mazda R26B 2.6 L 4-Rotor (2-8)	G	63	(United States) Rich Grupp	6
(Germany) Porsche AG (Germany) Joest Racing	Porsche LMP1-98	Porsche Type-935 3.2 L Turbo Flat-6	M	77	(Italy) Michele Alboreto	7
(Germany) Porsche AG (Germany) Joest Racing	Porsche LMP1-98	Porsche Type-935 3.2 L Turbo Flat-6	M	77	(Sweden) Stefan Johansson	7
(Germany) Porsche AG (Germany) Joest Racing	Porsche LMP1-98	Porsche Type-935 3.2 L Turbo Flat-6	M	77	(Germany) Jörg Müller	7
(United States) Dollahite Racing	Ferrari 333 SP	Ferrari F310E 4.0 L V12	Y	88	(United States) Bill Dollahite	2–3, 7–8
(United States) Dollahite Racing	Ferrari 333 SP	Ferrari F310E 4.0 L V12	Y	88	(United States) Mike Davies	2–3, 7–8
(United States) Dollahite Racing	Ferrari 333 SP	Ferrari F310E 4.0 L V12	Y	88	(United States) Anthony Lazzaro	7*
(United States) Denaba Racing	Kudzu DLM	Buick 4.5L V6	?	92	(United States) Joaquin DeSoto	6
(United States) Denaba Racing	Kudzu DLM	Buick 4.5L V6	?	92	(United States) A.J. Smith	6
(United States) TRV Motorsport	Kudzu DL-4	Chevrolet 6.0 L V8	G	95	(United States) Jeret Schroeder	1
(United States) TRV Motorsport	Kudzu DL-4	Chevrolet 6.0 L V8	G	95	(United States) Tom Volk	1
(United States) TRV Motorsport	Kudzu DL-4	Chevrolet 6.0 L V8	G	95	(United States) Lyn St. James	1
(United States) Team Cascadia	Argo JM20	Chevrolet SB-2 6.0L V8	G	97	(United States) Shane Lewis	6, 8
(United States) Team Cascadia	Argo JM20	Chevrolet SB-2 6.0L V8	G	97	(United States) Ed Zabinski	6, 8

=== GT1 ===
Team	Chassis	Engine	Tyre	No.	Drivers	Rnds.
(United States) Luis Sereix	Chevrolet Beretta (1) Chevrolet Camaro (6)	Chevrolet V8	?	0 13	(United States) Luis Sereix	1*, 6*
(United States) Luis Sereix	Chevrolet Beretta (1) Chevrolet Camaro (6)	Chevrolet V8	?	0 13	(United States) Daniel Urrutia	1*, 6*
(United States) Luis Sereix	Chevrolet Beretta (1) Chevrolet Camaro (6)	Chevrolet V8	?	0 13	(United States) Daniel Urrutia, Jr.	1*
(United States) Panoz Motorsports (United States) Visteon Panoz Racing Team	Panoz Esperante GTR-1 Q9	Ford (Roush) 6.0 L V8 Zytek Hybrid Electric	M	07	(Denmark) John Nielsen	7
(United States) Panoz Motorsports (United States) Visteon Panoz Racing Team	Panoz Esperante GTR-1 Q9	Ford (Roush) 6.0 L V8 Zytek Hybrid Electric	M	07	(United States) Doc Bundy	7
(United States) Panoz Motorsports (United States) Visteon Panoz Racing Team	Panoz Esperante GTR-1 Q9	Ford (Roush) 6.0 L V8 Zytek Hybrid Electric	M	07	(France) Christophe Tinseau	7
(United States) Panoz Motorsports (United States) Visteon Panoz Racing Team	Panoz Esperante GTR-1	Ford (Roush) 6.0L V8	M	4	(United Kingdom) Andy Wallace	All
(United States) Panoz Motorsports (United States) Visteon Panoz Racing Team	Panoz Esperante GTR-1	Ford (Roush) 6.0L V8	M	4	(Australia) David Brabham	All
(United States) Panoz Motorsports (United States) Visteon Panoz Racing Team	Panoz Esperante GTR-1	Ford (Roush) 6.0L V8	M	4	(United States) Scott Pruett	7
(United States) Panoz Motorsports (United States) Visteon Panoz Racing Team	Panoz Esperante GTR-1	Ford (Roush) 6.0L V8	M	4	(France) Éric Bernard	7
(United States) Panoz Motorsports (United States) Visteon Panoz Racing Team	Panoz Esperante GTR-1	Ford (Roush) 6.0L V8	M	5	(France) Éric Bernard	All
(United States) Panoz Motorsports (United States) Visteon Panoz Racing Team	Panoz Esperante GTR-1	Ford (Roush) 6.0L V8	M	5	(United Kingdom) Jamie Davies	1, 7
(United States) Panoz Motorsports (United States) Visteon Panoz Racing Team	Panoz Esperante GTR-1	Ford (Roush) 6.0L V8	M	5	(United States) Doc Bundy	1
(United States) Panoz Motorsports (United States) Visteon Panoz Racing Team	Panoz Esperante GTR-1	Ford (Roush) 6.0L V8	M	5	(Brazil) Raul Boesel	2–5
(United States) Panoz Motorsports (United States) Visteon Panoz Racing Team	Panoz Esperante GTR-1	Ford (Roush) 6.0L V8	M	5	(United States) Johnny O'Connell	6–8
(United States) Panoz Motorsports (United States) Visteon Panoz Racing Team	Panoz Esperante GTR-1	Ford (Roush) 6.0L V8	M	45	(United States) Johnny O'Connell	4
(United States) Panoz Motorsports (United States) Visteon Panoz Racing Team	Panoz Esperante GTR-1	Ford (Roush) 6.0L V8	M	45	(United States) Doc Bundy	4
(United States) Mosler Automotive	Mosler Raptor	Chevrolet 6.3 L V8	P	2	(United States) Shane Lewis	1–3
(United States) Mosler Automotive	Mosler Raptor	Chevrolet 6.3 L V8	P	2	(United States) Vic Rice	1–3
(United States) Mosler Automotive	Mosler Raptor	Chevrolet 6.3 L V8	P	2	(United States) Tom Reese	1
(United States) Greg Malvasc	Chevrolet Camaro	Chevrolet V8	G	3	(United States) Jerry Kinn	1
(United States) Greg Malvasc	Chevrolet Camaro	Chevrolet V8	G	3	(United States) Chuck Singletary	1
(United States) Greg Malvasc	Chevrolet Camaro	Chevrolet V8	G	3	(United States) Gerre Payvis	1
(United States) Robinson Racing	Oldsmobile Aurora GTS-1	Oldsmobile 4.0 L V8	G	11	(United States) Jack Baldwin	1
(United States) Robinson Racing	Oldsmobile Aurora GTS-1	Oldsmobile 4.0 L V8	G	11	(United States) Irv Hoerr	1
(United States) Robinson Racing	Oldsmobile Aurora GTS-1	Oldsmobile 4.0 L V8	G	11	(United States) George Robinson	1
(United States) Bruce Barkelew	Ford Mustang	Ford 4.6L V8	?	12	(United States) Brian Simo	3
(Germany) Porsche AG	Porsche 911 GT1-98	Porsche 3.2 L Turbo Flat-6	M	26	(United Kingdom) Allan McNish	7
(Germany) Porsche AG	Porsche 911 GT1-98	Porsche 3.2 L Turbo Flat-6	M	26	(Germany) Uwe Alzen	7
(Germany) Porsche AG	Porsche 911 GT1-98	Porsche 3.2 L Turbo Flat-6	M	26	(France) Yannick Dalmas	7
(United States) Champion Motors	Porsche 911 GT1 Evo	Porsche 9R1 3.2 L Turbo Flat-6	M	38 74	(Belgium) Thierry Boutsen	1, 4, 7
(United States) Champion Motors	Porsche 911 GT1 Evo	Porsche 9R1 3.2 L Turbo Flat-6	M	38 74	(France) Bob Wollek	1, 4, 7
(United States) Champion Motors	Porsche 911 GT1 Evo	Porsche 9R1 3.2 L Turbo Flat-6	M	38 74	(United States) Andy Pilgrim	1
(United States) Champion Motors	Porsche 911 GT1 Evo	Porsche 9R1 3.2 L Turbo Flat-6	M	38 74	(Germany) Ralf Kelleners	7
(United States) Art Pilla	Porsche 993 GT2 Evo	Porsche 3.6 L Turbo Flat-6	G	71	(United States) Art Pilla	1
(United States) Art Pilla	Porsche 993 GT2 Evo	Porsche 3.6 L Turbo Flat-6	G	71	(United States) Oma Kimbrough	1
(United States) Art Pilla	Porsche 993 GT2 Evo	Porsche 3.6 L Turbo Flat-6	G	71	(United States) David Kitchak	1
(United States) G&W Motorsports	Porsche 911 GT1	Porsche 9R1 3.2 L Turbo Flat-6	P	77	(United States) Darren Law	6
(United States) G&W Motorsports	Porsche 911 GT1	Porsche 9R1 3.2 L Turbo Flat-6	P	77	(United States) Danny Marshall	6
(United States) G&W Motorsports	Porsche 911 GT1	Porsche 9R1 3.2 L Turbo Flat-6	P	77	(United States) Andy Pilgrim	6*
(United States) John Annis	Chevrolet Camaro	Chevrolet V8	?	87	(United States) John Annis	1
(United States) John Annis	Chevrolet Camaro	Chevrolet V8	?	87	(United States) Lee Hill	1
(United States) John Annis	Chevrolet Camaro	Chevrolet V8	?	87	(United States) Randy Pobst	1
(United States) John Annis	Chevrolet Camaro	Chevrolet V8	?	87	(United States) Mick Robinson	1
(United States) Rock Valley Racing	Chevrolet Camaro	Chevrolet V8	G	91	(United States) John Heinricy	1
(United States) Rock Valley Racing	Chevrolet Camaro	Chevrolet V8	G	91	(United States) Stu Hayner	1
(United States) Rock Valley Racing	Chevrolet Camaro	Chevrolet V8	G	91	(United States) Roger Schramm	1

=== GT2 ===
Team	Chassis	Engine	Tyre	No.	Drivers	Rnds.
(United States) David Friedman	Porsche 993 Carrera RSR	Porsche 3.8L Flat-6	G	00	(United States) David Friedman	3, 5
(United States) David Friedman	Porsche 993 Carrera RSR	Porsche 3.8L Flat-6	G	00	(United States) Todd Snyder	3
(United States) David Friedman	Porsche 993 Carrera RSR	Porsche 3.8L Flat-6	G	00	(United States) Nick Longhi	5
(France) Larbre Compétition	Porsche 993 GT2	Porsche 3.6 L Turbo Flat-6	P	00	(France) Patrice Goueslard	7
(France) Larbre Compétition	Porsche 993 GT2	Porsche 3.6 L Turbo Flat-6	P	00	(Monaco) Stéphane Ortelli	7
(France) Larbre Compétition	Porsche 993 GT2	Porsche 3.6 L Turbo Flat-6	P	00	(France) Jack Leconte	7
(United States) Rohr	Porsche 993 GT2	Porsche 3.6 L Turbo Flat-6	P	01	(Canada) Sylvain Tremblay	1
(United States) Rohr	Porsche 993 GT2	Porsche 3.6 L Turbo Flat-6	P	01	(United States) Martin Snow	1
(United States) Rohr	Porsche 993 GT2	Porsche 3.6 L Turbo Flat-6	P	01	(United States) Jochen Rohr	1
(Canada) C. J. Motorsports	Porsche 993 GT2	Porsche 3.6 L Turbo Flat-6	G	04	(United States) John Morton	1, 5, 7
(Canada) C. J. Motorsports	Porsche 993 GT2	Porsche 3.6 L Turbo Flat-6	G	04	(Canada) John Graham	1, 5, 7
(Canada) C. J. Motorsports	Porsche 993 GT2	Porsche 3.6 L Turbo Flat-6	G	04	(Canada) Ron Fellows	1, 7
(United States) Prototype Technology Group	BMW M3	BMW 3.2 L I6	Y	6	(United States) Boris Said	2–4
(United States) Prototype Technology Group	BMW M3	BMW 3.2 L I6	Y	6	(United States) Andy Pilgrim	2
(United States) Prototype Technology Group	BMW M3	BMW 3.2 L I6	Y	6	(United States) Bill Auberlen	2
(United States) Prototype Technology Group	BMW M3	BMW 3.2 L I6	Y	6	(Belgium) Marc Duez	3–5
(United States) Prototype Technology Group	BMW M3	BMW 3.2 L I6	Y	6	(United States) Brian Simo	4
(United States) Prototype Technology Group	BMW M3	BMW 3.2 L I6	Y	6	(Canada) Ross Bentley	5
(United States) American Spirit Racing	Vector M12	Lamborghini 5.7 L V12	G	15	(United States) Bill Eagle	1–2
(United States) American Spirit Racing	Vector M12	Lamborghini 5.7 L V12	G	15	(United States) Dorsey Schroeder	1–2
(United States) American Spirit Racing	Vector M12	Lamborghini 5.7 L V12	G	15	(United States) Kevin Allen	4
(United States) American Spirit Racing	Vector M12	Lamborghini 5.7 L V12	G	15	(United States) Randy Pobst	4
(United States) Hi-Tech Performance	Toyota Supra	Toyota Turbo I4	?	31	(United States) Michael Smellie	1*
(United States) Hi-Tech Performance	Toyota Supra	Toyota Turbo I4	?	31	(United States) Chris Harris	1*
(United States) Hi-Tech Performance	Toyota Supra	Toyota Turbo I4	?	31	(United States) Michael Lewis	1*
(United States) Hi-Tech Performance	Toyota Supra	Toyota Turbo I4	?	31	(United States) Chris Smellie	1*
(United States) GTR Motorsport, Inc.	Porsche 993 Carrera RSR	Porsche 3.8L Flat-6	?	37	(United States) Jim Loftis	7*
(United States) GTR Motorsport, Inc.	Porsche 993 Carrera RSR	Porsche 3.8L Flat-6	?	37	(United States) Bob Strange	7*
(United States) GTR Motorsport, Inc.	Porsche 993 Carrera RSR	Porsche 3.8L Flat-6	?	37	(United States) John Finger	7*
(United States) Mark Hein	Acura NSX	Acura 3.2 L V6	G	38	(United States) Mark Hein	1
(United States) Mark Hein	Acura NSX	Acura 3.2 L V6	G	38	(United States) Gary Blackman	1
(United States) Mark Hein	Acura NSX	Acura 3.2 L V6	G	38	(United States) John Green	1
(United States) Mark Hein	Acura NSX	Acura 3.2 L V6	G	38	(United States) Pete Halsmer	1
(United States) Bell Motorsports	BMW M3	BMW 3.2L I6	?	54	(United States) Scott Neuman	6
(United States) Bell Motorsports	BMW M3	BMW 3.2L I6	?	54	(United States) Andy Pilgrim	6
(United States) Martin Snow Racing	Porsche 993 GT2	Porsche 3.6 L Turbo Flat-6	D	56	(United States) Martin Snow	6, 8
(United States) Martin Snow Racing	Porsche 993 GT2	Porsche 3.6 L Turbo Flat-6	D	56	(United States) Melanie Snow	6, 8
(United States) Al Broadfoot	Porsche 944 Turbo	Porsche 2.8 L Turbo	D	58	(United States) Bob Mazzuoccola	1*
(United States) Al Broadfoot	Porsche 944 Turbo	Porsche 2.8 L Turbo	D	58	(United States) Sam Wolkoff	1*
(United States) Al Broadfoot	Porsche 944 Turbo	Porsche 2.8 L Turbo	D	58	(United States) Mark Raccaro	1*
(United States) Al Broadfoot	Porsche 944 Turbo	Porsche 2.8 L Turbo	D	58	(United States) John Fillipakis	1*
(Netherlands) Marcos Racing International	Marcos LM600	Chevrolet 6.0 L V8	D	59 71	(Netherlands) Cor Euser	7–8
(Netherlands) Marcos Racing International	Marcos LM600	Chevrolet 6.0 L V8	D	59 71	(United Kingdom) Christian Vann	7
(Netherlands) Marcos Racing International	Marcos LM600	Chevrolet 6.0 L V8	D	59 71	(Germany) Harald Becker	7
(Netherlands) Marcos Racing International	Marcos LM600	Chevrolet 6.0 L V8	D	59 71	(Netherlands) Herman Buurman	8
(United States) Saleen/Allen Speedlab	Saleen Mustang SR	Ford 5.9 L V8	?	65	(United States) Ron Johnson	1, 8
(United States) Saleen/Allen Speedlab	Saleen Mustang SR	Ford 5.9 L V8	?	65	(United States) Steve Saleen	1
(United States) Saleen/Allen Speedlab	Saleen Mustang SR	Ford 5.9 L V8	?	65	(United States) Tommy Archer	1
(United States) Saleen/Allen Speedlab	Saleen Mustang SR	Ford 5.9 L V8	?	65	(United States) Andy Pilgrim	8
(United States) Saleen/Allen Speedlab	Saleen Mustang SR	Ford 5.9 L V8	?	65	(United States) Terry Borcheller	8
(Germany) Konrad Motorsport	Porsche 993 GT2	Porsche 3.6 L Turbo Flat-6	D	66	(United States) Nick Ham	1–2
(Germany) Konrad Motorsport	Porsche 993 GT2	Porsche 3.6 L Turbo Flat-6	D	66	(Austria) Franz Konrad	1–2
(Germany) Konrad Motorsport	Porsche 993 GT2	Porsche 3.6 L Turbo Flat-6	D	72	(Austria) Franz Konrad	7–8
(Germany) Konrad Motorsport	Porsche 993 GT2	Porsche 3.6 L Turbo Flat-6	D	72	(Netherlands) Jan Lammers	7–8
(Germany) Konrad Motorsport	Porsche 993 GT2	Porsche 3.6 L Turbo Flat-6	D	73	(Italy) Angelo Zadra	7
(Germany) Konrad Motorsport	Porsche 993 GT2	Porsche 3.6 L Turbo Flat-6	D	73	(United States) Charles Slater	7
(Germany) Konrad Motorsport	Porsche 993 GT2	Porsche 3.6 L Turbo Flat-6	D	73	(United States) Peter Kitchak	7
(Germany) Konrad Motorsport	Porsche 993 GT2	Porsche 3.6 L Turbo Flat-6	D	77	(United States) Peter Kitchak	1
(Germany) Konrad Motorsport	Porsche 993 GT2	Porsche 3.6 L Turbo Flat-6	D	77	(Germany) Wido Rössler	1
(Germany) Konrad Motorsport	Porsche 993 GT2	Porsche 3.6 L Turbo Flat-6	D	77	(United States) Matt Turner	1
(United States) Charles Coker Jr.	Porsche 968 Turbo RS	Porsche 3.0 L Turbo I4	P	68	(United States) Charles Coker Jr.	7
(United States) Charles Coker Jr.	Porsche 968 Turbo RS	Porsche 3.0 L Turbo I4	P	68	(United States) Joe Varde	7
(United States) Charles Coker Jr.	Porsche 968 Turbo RS	Porsche 3.0 L Turbo I4	P	68	(United States) Joe Foster	7
(United States) Charles Coker Jr.	Porsche 968 Turbo RS	Porsche 3.0 L Turbo I4	P	68	(United States) Dave White	7
(Germany) Gustl Spreng	Porsche 993 GT2	Porsche 3.6 L Turbo Flat-6	Y	69	(Germany) Gustl Spreng	1
(Germany) Gustl Spreng	Porsche 993 GT2	Porsche 3.6 L Turbo Flat-6	Y	69	(Germany) Kersten Jodexnis	1
(Germany) Gustl Spreng	Porsche 993 GT2	Porsche 3.6 L Turbo Flat-6	Y	69	(United States) Ray Mummery	1
(United States) Pettit Racing	Mazda RX-7	Mazda 2.0 L 3-Rotor	D	75	(United States) Cameron Worth	7
(United States) Pettit Racing	Mazda RX-7	Mazda 2.0 L 3-Rotor	D	75	(United States) Scott Sansone	7
(United States) Team A.R.E.	Porsche 993 GT2	Porsche 3.6 L Turbo Flat-6	Y	76	(United States) Mike Doolin	8
(United States) Team A.R.E.	Porsche 993 GT2	Porsche 3.6 L Turbo Flat-6	Y	76	(United States) Scott Peeler	8
(Germany) Freisinger Motorsport	Porsche 993 GT2	Porsche 3.6 L Turbo Flat-6	P	81	(France) Michel Ligonnet	7
(Germany) Freisinger Motorsport	Porsche 993 GT2	Porsche 3.6 L Turbo Flat-6	P	81	(United States) Lance Stewart	7
(Germany) Freisinger Motorsport	Porsche 993 GT2	Porsche 3.6 L Turbo Flat-6	P	81	(France) Jean-Pierre Jarier	7*
(Germany) Freisinger Motorsport	Porsche 993 GT2	Porsche 3.6 L Turbo Flat-6	P	81	(Germany) Wolfgang Kaufmann	7*
(United States) Spirit of Daytona	Toyota Supra	Toyota Turbo I4	?	88	(United States) Craig Conway	4*
(United States) Spirit of Daytona	Toyota Supra	Toyota Turbo I4	?	88	(United States) Eric van Cleef	4*
(United States) Schumacher Racing	Porsche 993 GT2	Porsche 3.6 L Turbo Flat-6	P	99	(United States) Larry Schumacher	1–6, 8
(United States) Schumacher Racing	Porsche 993 GT2	Porsche 3.6 L Turbo Flat-6	P	99	(United States) John O'Steen	1, 4–6, 8
(United States) Schumacher Racing	Porsche 993 GT2	Porsche 3.6 L Turbo Flat-6	P	99	(United States) Robert Nearn	1
(United States) Schumacher Racing	Porsche 993 GT2	Porsche 3.6 L Turbo Flat-6	P	99	(United States) Martin Snow	2
(United States) Schumacher Racing	Porsche 993 GT2	Porsche 3.6 L Turbo Flat-6	P	99	(United States) Joe Varde	3
(United States) Schumacher Racing	Porsche 993 GT2	Porsche 3.6 L Turbo Flat-6	P	99	(United States) Andy Pilgrim	4–5, 8

=== GT3 ===
Team	Chassis	Engine	Tyre	No.	Drivers	Rnds.
(United States) G & W Motorsports	Porsche 993 Carrera RSR	Porsche 3.8L Flat-6	P	07	(United States) Danny Marshall	1
(United States) G & W Motorsports	Porsche 993 Carrera RSR	Porsche 3.8L Flat-6	P	07	(United States) Steve Marshall	1
(United States) G & W Motorsports	Porsche 993 Carrera RSR	Porsche 3.8L Flat-6	P	07	(Netherlands) Patrick Huisman	1
(United States) G & W Motorsports	Porsche 993 Carrera RSR	Porsche 3.8L Flat-6	P	07	(United States) Darren Law	1
(United States) G & W Motorsports	Porsche 993 Carrera RSR	Porsche 3.8L Flat-6	P	86	(United States) Mike Fitzgerald	1, 4
(United States) G & W Motorsports	Porsche 993 Carrera RSR	Porsche 3.8L Flat-6	P	86	(United States) Darren Law	1, 6
(United States) G & W Motorsports	Porsche 993 Carrera RSR	Porsche 3.8L Flat-6	P	86	(United States) Steve Pfeffer	1
(United States) G & W Motorsports	Porsche 993 Carrera RSR	Porsche 3.8L Flat-6	P	86	(United States) Cort Wagner	4
(United States) G & W Motorsports	Porsche 993 Carrera RSR	Porsche 3.8L Flat-6	P	86	(United States) Steve Marshall	6–7
(United States) G & W Motorsports	Porsche 993 Carrera RSR	Porsche 3.8L Flat-6	P	86	(United States) Danny Marshall	7
(United States) G & W Motorsports	Porsche 993 Carrera RSR	Porsche 3.8L Flat-6	P	86	(Canada) Sylvain Tremblay	7
(United States) Prototype Technology Group	BMW M3 (E36)	BMW 3.2 L I6	Y	1	(United States) Craig Carter	1
(United States) Prototype Technology Group	BMW M3 (E36)	BMW 3.2 L I6	Y	1	(United States) Andy Petery	1
(United States) Prototype Technology Group	BMW M3 (E36)	BMW 3.2 L I6	Y	1	(Italy) Giovanna Amati	1
(United States) Prototype Technology Group	BMW M3 (E36)	BMW 3.2 L I6	Y	1	(United States) Peter Cunningham	2–5, 7–8
(United States) Prototype Technology Group	BMW M3 (E36)	BMW 3.2 L I6	Y	1	(Canada) Ross Bentley	2–5
(United States) Prototype Technology Group	BMW M3 (E36)	BMW 3.2 L I6	Y	1	(United States) Brian Simo	7
(United States) Prototype Technology Group	BMW M3 (E36)	BMW 3.2 L I6	Y	1	(United States) Terry Borcheller	7
(United States) Prototype Technology Group	BMW M3 (E36)	BMW 3.2 L I6	Y	1	(Costa Rica) Javier Quiros	7
(United States) Prototype Technology Group	BMW M3 (E36)	BMW 3.2 L I6	Y	1	(United States) Bill Auberlen	8
(United States) Prototype Technology Group	BMW M3 (E36)	BMW 3.2 L I6	Y	6	(United States) Peter Cunningham	1, 6, 8
(United States) Prototype Technology Group	BMW M3 (E36)	BMW 3.2 L I6	Y	6	(Canada) Ross Bentley	1, 6–7
(United States) Prototype Technology Group	BMW M3 (E36)	BMW 3.2 L I6	Y	6	(United States) Mark Simo	1, 8
(United States) Prototype Technology Group	BMW M3 (E36)	BMW 3.2 L I6	Y	6	(United States) Darren Law	7
(United States) Prototype Technology Group	BMW M3 (E36)	BMW 3.2 L I6	Y	6	(United States) Jeff Schafer	7
(United States) Prototype Technology Group	BMW M3 (E36)	BMW 3.2 L I6	Y	6	(Australia) David Besnard	7
(United States) Prototype Technology Group	BMW M3 (E36)	BMW 3.2 L I6	Y	10	(United States) Bill Auberlen	1–7
(United States) Prototype Technology Group	BMW M3 (E36)	BMW 3.2 L I6	Y	10	(United States) Boris Said	1
(United States) Prototype Technology Group	BMW M3 (E36)	BMW 3.2 L I6	Y	10	(United States) Mark Simo	2–8
(United States) Prototype Technology Group	BMW M3 (E36)	BMW 3.2 L I6	Y	10	(Belgium) Marc Duez	2
(United States) Prototype Technology Group	BMW M3 (E36)	BMW 3.2 L I6	Y	10	(United States) Andy Pilgrim	7
(United States) Prototype Technology Group	BMW M3 (E36)	BMW 3.2 L I6	Y	10	(Canada) Ross Bentley	8
(United States) T. C. Kline	BMW M3 (E36)	BMW 3.2 L I6	Y	12	(United States) Pete Halsmer	7
(United States) T. C. Kline	BMW M3 (E36)	BMW 3.2 L I6	Y	12	(United States) Randy Pobst	7
(United States) T. C. Kline	BMW M3 (E36)	BMW 3.2 L I6	Y	12	(United States) Shane Lewis	7
(United States) AASCO Performance	Porsche 993 Carrera RSR	Porsche 3.8L Flat-6	P	17	(United States) Tom Peterson	2, 8
(United States) AASCO Performance	Porsche 993 Carrera RSR	Porsche 3.8L Flat-6	P	17	(United States) Dennis Aase	2, 8
(United States) AASCO Performance	Porsche 993 Carrera RSR	Porsche 3.8L Flat-6	P	55	(United States) Tim Ralston	1–2, 8
(United States) AASCO Performance	Porsche 993 Carrera RSR	Porsche 3.8L Flat-6	P	55	(Costa Rica) Jorge Trejos	1–2
(United States) AASCO Performance	Porsche 993 Carrera RSR	Porsche 3.8L Flat-6	P	55	(United States) Kelly Collins	1
(United States) AASCO Performance	Porsche 993 Carrera RSR	Porsche 3.8L Flat-6	P	55	(United States) Charles Slater	8
(United States) Reisman Property Interests, Inc.	Chevrolet Camaro	Chevrolet 5.7L V8	?	22	(United States) John Reisman	3
(United States) Reisman Property Interests, Inc.	Chevrolet Camaro	Chevrolet 5.7L V8	?	22	(United States) Paul Reisman	3
(United States) Alex Job Racing	Porsche 993 Carrera RSR	Porsche 3.8L Flat-6	P	22	(United States) Kelly Collins	6, 8
(United States) Alex Job Racing	Porsche 993 Carrera RSR	Porsche 3.8L Flat-6	P	22	(United States) Cort Wagner	6
(United States) Alex Job Racing	Porsche 993 Carrera RSR	Porsche 3.8L Flat-6	P	22	(United States) Darryl Havens	8
(United States) Alex Job Racing	Porsche 993 Carrera RSR	Porsche 3.8L Flat-6	P	23	(United States) Darryl Havens	1–7
(United States) Alex Job Racing	Porsche 993 Carrera RSR	Porsche 3.8L Flat-6	P	23	(United States) Cort Wagner	1–5, 7–8
(United States) Alex Job Racing	Porsche 993 Carrera RSR	Porsche 3.8L Flat-6	P	23	(United States) Charles Slater	1
(United States) Alex Job Racing	Porsche 993 Carrera RSR	Porsche 3.8L Flat-6	P	23	(United States) Kelly Collins	4, 6–7
(United States) Alex Job Racing	Porsche 993 Carrera RSR	Porsche 3.8L Flat-6	P	23	(United States) David Murry	8
(United States) Alex Job Racing	Porsche 993 Carrera RSR	Porsche 3.8L Flat-6	P	25	(United States) Don Kitch	1–2, 8
(United States) Alex Job Racing	Porsche 993 Carrera RSR	Porsche 3.8L Flat-6	P	25	(United States) Michael Petersen	1–2, 8
(United States) Alex Job Racing	Porsche 993 Carrera RSR	Porsche 3.8L Flat-6	P	25	(United States) Dale White	1–2
(United States) Alex Job Racing	Porsche 993 Carrera RSR	Porsche 3.8L Flat-6	P	25	(United States) Charles Slater	1
(United States) Alex Job Racing	Porsche 993 Carrera RSR	Porsche 3.8L Flat-6	P	25	(Italy) Angelo Cilli	1
(United States) Alex Job Racing	Porsche 993 Carrera RSR	Porsche 3.8L Flat-6	P	25	(United States) 'Trip' Goolsby	8
(United States) Tim Vargo	Porsche 993 Carrera RSR	Porsche 3.8L Flat-6	P	24	(United States) Tim Vargo	1, 3–4
(United States) Tim Vargo	Porsche 993 Carrera RSR	Porsche 3.8L Flat-6	P	24	(United States) Brady Refenning	1, 3–4
(United States) Tim Vargo	Porsche 993 Carrera RSR	Porsche 3.8L Flat-6	P	24	(United States) Josh Vargo	1, 4
(United States) Tim Vargo	Porsche 993 Carrera RSR	Porsche 3.8L Flat-6	P	24	(United States) Jack Refenning	1
(United States) Tim Vargo	Porsche 993 Carrera RSR	Porsche 3.8L Flat-6	P	24	(United States) Jake Vargo	4
(United States) Darn Good Foods	Porsche 993 Carrera RSR	Porsche 3.8L Flat-6	?	31	(United States) Steve Velasquez	8
(United States) Darn Good Foods	Porsche 993 Carrera RSR	Porsche 3.8L Flat-6	?	31	(United States) Steven Alarcon	8
(United States) Phoenix Motorsports	Pontiac Firebird	Pontiac V8	T	32	(United States) Don Knowles	1
(United States) Phoenix Motorsports	Pontiac Firebird	Pontiac V8	T	32	(United States) Jim McNeely	1
(United States) Phoenix Motorsports	Pontiac Firebird	Pontiac V8	T	32	(United States) John Heinricy	1
(United States) Phoenix Motorsports	Pontiac Firebird	Pontiac V8	T	32	(United States) Jim Michaelian	1
(United States) Phoenix Motorsports	Pontiac Firebird	Pontiac V8	T	33	(United States) Jim Michaelian	1
(United States) Phoenix Motorsports	Pontiac Firebird	Pontiac V8	T	33	(United States) Steve McNeely	1
(United States) Phoenix Motorsports	Pontiac Firebird	Pontiac V8	T	33	(United States) Joe Aquilante	1
(United States) Technodyne	Porsche 993 Carrera RSR	Porsche 3.8L Flat-6	?	41	(United States) Chris Cervelli	2
(United States) Technodyne	Porsche 993 Carrera RSR	Porsche 3.8L Flat-6	?	41	(United States) Bruce Busby	2
(United States) Bill Radar	Porsche 993 Carrera RSR	Porsche 3.8L Flat-6	P	46	(United States) Max Schmidt	1
(United States) Bill Radar	Porsche 993 Carrera RSR	Porsche 3.8L Flat-6	P	46	(United States) Chris Bingham	1
(United States) John Finger	Porsche 993 Carrera RSR	Porsche 3.8L Flat-6	?	48	(United States) John Finger	4
(United States) John Finger	Porsche 993 Carrera RSR	Porsche 3.8L Flat-6	?	48	(United States) Mike Green	4
(United States) Bell Motorsports	BMW M3 (E36)	BMW 3.2 L I6	Y	54	(United States) Carlos de Quesada	1
(United States) Bell Motorsports	BMW M3 (E36)	BMW 3.2 L I6	Y	54	(United States) Terry Borcheller	1
(United States) Bell Motorsports	BMW M3 (E36)	BMW 3.2 L I6	Y	54	(United States) Scott Neuman	1
(United States) Bell Motorsports	BMW M3 (E36)	BMW 3.2 L I6	Y	54	(United States) Joe Varde	1
(United States) Kryderacing	Nissan 240SX	Nissan 2.4 L I4	G	57	(United States) Luis Sereix	1
(United States) Kryderacing	Nissan 240SX	Nissan 2.4 L I4	G	57	(United States) Frank Del Vecchio	1
(United States) Kryderacing	Nissan 240SX	Nissan 2.4 L I4	G	57	(United States) Reed Kryder	1
(United States) The Racer's Group	Porsche 993 Carrera RSR	Porsche 3.8L Flat-6	G	67	(United States) Steve Pelke	1, 8
(United States) The Racer's Group	Porsche 993 Carrera RSR	Porsche 3.8L Flat-6	G	67	(United States) Peter Baron	1
(United States) The Racer's Group	Porsche 993 Carrera RSR	Porsche 3.8L Flat-6	G	67	(United States) Dennis O'Keefe	1
(United States) The Racer's Group	Porsche 993 Carrera RSR	Porsche 3.8L Flat-6	G	67	(United States) Scott Killips	8
(United States) The Racer's Group	Porsche 993 Carrera RSR	Porsche 3.8L Flat-6	G	68	(United States) Kevin Buckler	1, 8
(United States) The Racer's Group	Porsche 993 Carrera RSR	Porsche 3.8L Flat-6	G	68	(United States) Stephen Earle	1
(United States) The Racer's Group	Porsche 993 Carrera RSR	Porsche 3.8L Flat-6	G	68	(United States) Philip Collin	1
(United States) The Racer's Group	Porsche 993 Carrera RSR	Porsche 3.8L Flat-6	G	68	(United States) Vic Rice	8
(United States) Gordon Zimmerman	Porsche 993 Carrera RSR	Porsche 3.8L Flat-6	?	71	(United States) Gordon Zimmerman	3
(United States) Gordon Zimmerman	Porsche 993 Carrera RSR	Porsche 3.8L Flat-6	?	71	(United States) Steve Pfeffer	3
(United States) Team A.R.E.	Porsche 993 Carrera RSR	Porsche 3.8L Flat-6	Y	76	(United States) Peter Argetsinger	1, 7
(United States) Team A.R.E.	Porsche 993 Carrera RSR	Porsche 3.8L Flat-6	Y	76	(United States) John Ruther	1
(United States) Team A.R.E.	Porsche 993 Carrera RSR	Porsche 3.8L Flat-6	Y	76	(United States) Jake Vargo	1
(United States) Team A.R.E.	Porsche 993 Carrera RSR	Porsche 3.8L Flat-6	Y	76	(United States) Nick Anegelos	1
(United States) Team A.R.E.	Porsche 993 Carrera RSR	Porsche 3.8L Flat-6	Y	76	(United States) Mike Doolin	2
(United States) Team A.R.E.	Porsche 993 Carrera RSR	Porsche 3.8L Flat-6	Y	76	(United States) Scott Peeler	2
(United States) Team A.R.E.	Porsche 993 Carrera RSR	Porsche 3.8L Flat-6	Y	76	(United States) Richard Polidori	7
(United States) Team A.R.E.	Porsche 993 Carrera RSR	Porsche 3.8L Flat-6	Y	76	(Italy) Angelo Cilli	7
(United States) Raymond Boissoneau	Mazda RX-7	Mazda 2.0 L 3-Rotor	?	81	(United States) Raymond Boissoneau	3
(United States) Raymond Boissoneau	Mazda RX-7	Mazda 2.0 L 3-Rotor	?	81	(Brazil) Nicolas Rondet	3
(United States) Raymond Boissoneau	Mazda RX-7	Mazda 2.0 L 3-Rotor	?	81	(Italy) Rino Mastronardi	3
Team Ecuador	Nissan 240SX	Nissan 2.4 L I4	Y	93	(Ecuador) Henry Taleb	1, 7
Team Ecuador	Nissan 240SX	Nissan 2.4 L I4	Y	93	(New Zealand) Rob Wilson	1, 7
Team Ecuador	Nissan 240SX	Nissan 2.4 L I4	Y	93	(Italy) Rino Mastronardi	1
Team Ecuador	Nissan 240SX	Nissan 2.4 L I4	Y	93	(Ecuador) Xavier Collado	7
(United States) Olive Garden Racing	Porsche 993 Carrera RSR	Porsche 3.8L Flat-6	P	96	(United States) Kevin Wheeler	1
(United States) Olive Garden Racing	Porsche 993 Carrera RSR	Porsche 3.8L Flat-6	P	96	(United States) Mike Davies	1
(United States) Olive Garden Racing	Porsche 993 Carrera RSR	Porsche 3.8L Flat-6	P	96	(United States) Ron Zitza	1
(United States) Pumpelly Mitchum Racing	Porsche 993 Carrera RSR	Porsche 3.8L Flat-6	?	98	(United States) Spencer Pumpelly	3
(United States) Pumpelly Mitchum Racing	Porsche 993 Carrera RSR	Porsche 3.8L Flat-6	?	98	(United States) Matt Plumb	3

== Season results ==
Rnd	Circuit	WSC Winning Team	GT1 Winning Team	GT2 Winning Team	GT3 Winning Team	Results
Rnd	Circuit	WSC Winning Drivers	GT1 Winning Drivers	GT2 Winning Drivers	GT3 Winning Drivers	Results
1	Sebring	(United States) #30 MOMO Doran Racing	(United States) #4 Panoz Motorsports	(Germany) #66 Konrad Motorsport	(United States) #10 PTG	Results
1	Sebring	(Belgium) Didier Theys (Italy) Mauro Baldi (Italy) Gianpiero Moretti	(United Kingdom) Andy Wallace (Australia) David Brabham	(Austria) Franz Konrad (United States) Nick Ham	(United States) Bill Auberlen (United States) Boris Said	Results
2	Las Vegas	(United States) #7 Doyle-Risi Racing	(United States) #4 Panoz Motorsports	(United States) #6 PTG	(United States) #10 PTG	Results
2	Las Vegas	(South Africa) Wayne Taylor (Belgium) Eric van de Poele	(United Kingdom) Andy Wallace (Australia) David Brabham	(United States) Andy Pilgrim (United States) Boris Said (Belgium) Marc Duez	(United States) Peter Cunningham (Canada) Ross Bentley	Results
3	Lime Rock	(United States) #16 Dyson Racing	(United States) #4 Panoz Motorsports	(United States) #6 PTG	(United States) #1 PTG	Results
3	Lime Rock	(United States) Butch Leitzinger (United Kingdom) James Weaver	(United Kingdom) Andy Wallace (Australia) David Brabham	(United States) Boris Said (Belgium) Marc Duez	(United States) Peter Cunningham (Canada) Ross Bentley	Results
4	Road Atlanta	(United States) #16 Dyson Racing	(United States) #38 Champion Motors	(United States) #6 PTG	(United States) #10 PTG	Results
4	Road Atlanta	(United States) Butch Leitzinger (United Kingdom) James Weaver	(Belgium) Thierry Boutsen (France) Bob Wollek	(United States) Boris Said (Belgium) Marc Duez	(United States) Bill Auberlen (United States) Mark Simo	Results
5	Mosport	(United States) #16 Dyson Racing	(United States) #4 Panoz Motorsports	(United States) #6 PTG	(United States) #10 PTG	Results
5	Mosport	(United States) Butch Leitzinger (United Kingdom) James Weaver	(United Kingdom) Andy Wallace (Australia) David Brabham	(Belgium) Marc Duez (Canada) Ross Bentley	(United States) Bill Auberlen (United States) Mark Simo	Results
6	Sebring	(United States) #16 Dyson Racing	(United States) #4 Panoz Motorsports	(United States) #99 Schumacher Racing	(United States) #22 Alex Job Racing	Results
6	Sebring	(United States) Butch Leitzinger (United Kingdom) James Weaver	(United Kingdom) Andy Wallace (Australia) David Brabham	(United States) Larry Schumacher (United States) John O'Steen	(United States) Cort Wagner (United States) Kelly Collins	Results
7	Road Atlanta	(United States) #7 Doyle-Risi Racing	(United States) #38 Champion Motors	(Germany) #81 Freisinger Motorsport	(United States) #76 Team A.R.E.	Results
7	Road Atlanta	(Belgium) Eric van de Poele (South Africa) Wayne Taylor (France) Emmanuel Collard	(Belgium) Thierry Boutsen (France) Bob Wollek (Germany) Ralf Kelleners	(France) Michel Ligonnet (United States) Lance Stewart	(United States) Peter Argetsinger (United States) Richard Polidori (Italy) Angelo Cilli	Results
8	Laguna Seca	(Germany) #2 BMW Motorsport	(United States) #4 Panoz Motorsports	(Germany) #72 Konrad Motorsport	(United States) #23 Alex Job Racing	Results
8	Laguna Seca	(United States) Bill Auberlen (Belgium) Didier de Radigues	(United Kingdom) Andy Wallace (Australia) David Brabham	(Austria) Franz Konrad (Netherlands) Jan Lammers	(United States) David Murry (United States) Cort Wagner	Results

== Teams Championship ==
Points are awarded to the finishers in the following order:

- 25-21-19-17-15-14-13-12-11-10-...

Exception however for the 12 Hours of Sebring, which awarded in the following order:

- 30-26-24-22-20-19-18-17-16-15-...

Teams only score the points of their highest finishing entry in each race.

=== WSC Standings ===
Pos	Team	Chassis	Engine	Rd 1	Rd 2	Rd 3	Rd 4	Rd 5	Rd 6	Rd 7	Rd 8	Total
1	(United States) Doyle-Risi Racing	Ferrari 333 SP	Ferrari F310E 4.0 L V12	26	25	19	19	17	11	25	19	161
2	(United States) Dyson Racing	Riley & Scott Mk III	Ford 5.0 L V8	24		25	25	25	25		21	145
3	(United States) Downing Atlanta	Kudzu DLM; Kudzu DLY	Mazda 2.0 L 3-Rotor; Mazda R26B 2.6 L 4-Rotor	15	21	13	14	14	13	15	13	118
4	(United States) Intersport Racing	Riley & Scott Mk III; Spice SC95	Ford 5.0 L V8; Oldsmobile Aurora 4.0 L V8	18	19	11	9	15	12	13	17	114
5	(United States) MOMO/Doran Enterprises	Ferrari 333 SP	Ferrari F310E 4.0 L V12	30		21	10	19		12	15	107
6=	(United States) Transatlantic Racing Services	Riley & Scott Mk III	Ford 5.0 L V8	17		14	17		19	19	7	93
6=	(United States) Matthews-Colucci Racing	Riley & Scott Mk III	Ford 5.0 L V8	20	14	15	15		15	14		93
8	(United States) Dollahite Racing	Spice BDG-02; Ferrari 333 SP	Chevrolet 6.0 L V8; Ferrari F310E 4.0 L V12		13					17	14	44
9	(United States) Genesis Racing	Hawk MD3R	Mazda 2.0 L 3-Rotor; Chevrolet 6.0 L V8	19			11					30
10	(United States) Kopf Race Products	Keiler KII	Ford 5.0 L V8		15						12	27
11	(Germany) BMW Motorsport	Riley & Scott Mk III	BMW 4.0 L V8								25	25
12	(United States) TRV Motorsports	Kudzu DL-4	Chevrolet 6.0 L V8	22								22
13	(Germany) Porsche AG	Porsche LMP1-98	Porsche 3.2 L Turbo Flat-6							21		21
14	(United States) Team Cascandia	Argo JM20	Chevrolet 6.0 L V8						17			17
15	(United States) Denaba Racing	Kudzu DLM	Buick 4.5 L V6						14			14
16	(United States) Fantasy Junction	Cannibal	Chevrolet 6.0 L V8								10	10

=== GT1 Standings ===
Pos	Team	Chassis	Engine	Rd 1	Rd 2	Rd 3	Rd 4	Rd 5	Rd 6	Rd 7	Rd 8	Total
1	(United States) Panoz Motor Sports	Panoz Esperante GTR-1	Ford (Roush) 6.0 L V8	30	25	25	21	25	25	21	25	197
2	(United States) Champion Motors	Porsche 911 GT1 Evo	Porsche 3.2 L Turbo Flat-6	26			25			25		76
3	(United States) Mosler Automotive	Mosler Raptor	Chevrolet 6.3 L V8	20	19	19						57
4	(United States) Rock Valley Racing	Chevrolet Camaro	Chevrolet V8	22								22
5	(United States) G & W Motorsports	Porsche 911 GT1 Evo	Porsche 3.2 L Turbo Flat-6						21			21
6	(United States) Art Pilla	Porsche 911 GT2 Evo	Porsche 3.6 L Turbo Flat-6	19								19
7	(United States) Robinson Racing	Oldsmobile Aurora GTS-1	Oldsmobile 4.0 L V8	18								18
8=	(United States) John Annis	Chevrolet Camaro	Chevrolet V8	17								17
8=	(Germany) Porsche AG	Porsche 911 GT1-98	Porsche 3.2 L Turbo Flat-6							17		17
10	(United States) Greg Malvaso	Chevrolet Camaro	Chevrolet V8	16								16

=== GT2 Standings ===
Pos	Team	Chassis	Engine	Rd 1	Rd 2	Rd 3	Rd 4	Rd 5	Rd 6	Rd 7	Rd 8	Total
1	(United States) Schumacher Racing	Porsche 911 GT2	Porsche 3.6 L Flat-6	22	21	21	21	21	25		17	148
2	(United States) Prototype Technology Group	BMW M3	BMW 3.2 L I6		25	25	25	25				100
3	(Germany) Konrad Motorsport	Porsche 911 GT2	Porsche 3.6 L Turbo Flat-6	30						21	25	76
4	(Canada) C.J. Motorsports	Porsche 911 GT2	Porsche 3.6 L Turbo Flat-6	24				19		19		62
5	(United States) Saleen-Allen Speedlab	Saleen Mustang SR	Ford 5.9 L V8	26							14	40
6=	(United States) Martin Snow Racing	Porsche 911 GT2	Porsche 3.6 L Turbo Flat-6						19		19	38
6=	(United States) American Spirit Racing	Vector M12	Lamborghini 5.7 L V12		19		19					38
8	(United States) David Friedman	Porsche 911 Carrera RSR	Porsche 3.8 L Flat-6			19		17				36
9	(Netherlands) Marcos Racing International	Marcos LM600	Chevrolet 6.0 L V8							12	21	33
10	(Germany) Freisinger Motorsport	Porsche 911 GT2	Porsche 3.6 L Turbo Flat-6							25		25
11	(United States) Bell Motorsports	BMW M3	BMW 3.2 L I6						21			21
12	(United States) Rohr	Porsche 911 GT2 Evo	Porsche 3.6 L Turbo Flat-6	19								19
13	(United States) Mark Hein	Acura NSX	Acura 3.2 L V6	18								18
14=	(France) Larbre Compétition	Porsche 911 GT2	Porsche 3.6 L Turbo Flat-6							17		17
14=	(United States) Jon Lewis	Vector M12	Lamborghini 5.7 L V12	17								17
16=	(United States) Cameron Worth	Mazda RX-7	Mazda 2.0 L 3-Rotor							15		15
16=	(United States) Alex Job Racing	Porsche 911 Carrera RSR	Porsche 3.8 L Flat-6								15	15
18	(United States) Charles Coker Jr.	Porsche 968 Turbo RS	Porsche 3.0 L Turbo I4							13		13

=== GT3 Standings ===
Pos	Team	Chassis	Engine	Rd 1	Rd 2	Rd 3	Rd 4	Rd 5	Rd 6	Rd 7	Rd 8	Total
1	(United States) Prototype Technology Group	BMW M3	BMW 3.2 L I6	30	25	25	25	25	19	21	21	191
2	(United States) Alex Job Racing	Porsche 911 Carrera RSR	Porsche 3.8 L Flat-6	24	17	19		19	25	12	25	141
3	(United States) G & W Motorsports	Porsche 911 Carrera RSR	Porsche 3.8 L Flat-6	22			19		15	15		71
4	(United States) Team A.R.E.	Porsche 911 Carrera RSR	Porsche 3.8 L Flat-6	20	14					25	11	70
5	(United States) AASCO Performance (#55)	Porsche 911 Carrera RSR	Porsche 3.8 L Flat-6	13	13						17	43
6	(United States) Tim Vargo	Porsche 911 Carrera RSR	Porsche 3.8 L Flat-6	19		15						34
7=	(United States) The Racer's Group	Porsche 911 Carrera RSR	Porsche 3.8 L Flat-6	14							19	33
7=	(United States) AASCO Performance (#17)	Porsche 911 Carrera RSR	Porsche 3.8 L Flat-6		19						14	33
9	Team Ecuador	Nissan 240SX	Nissan 2.4 L I4	10						13		23
10=	(United States) Olive Garden Racing	Porsche 911 Carrera RSR	Porsche 3.8 L Flat-6	17								17
10=	(United States) Gordon Zimmerman	Porsche 911 Carrera RSR	Porsche 3.8 L Flat-6			17						17
12	(United States) Bill Radar	Porsche 911 Carrera RSR	Porsche 3.8 L Flat-6	16								16
13=	(United States) Phoenix Motorsports	Pontiac Firebird	Pontiac V8	15								15
13=	(United States) Technodyne	Porsche 911 Carrera RSR	Porsche 3.8 L Flat-6		15							15
15=	(United States) Chris Mitchum	Porsche 911 Carrera RSR	Porsche 3.8 L Flat-6			14						14
15=	(United States) T.C. Kline	BMW M3	BMW 3.2 L I6							14		14
17	(United States) Raymond Boissoneau	Mazda RX-7	Mazda 2.0 L 3-Rotor			13						13
18=	(United States) Reisman Property Interests	Chevrolet Camaro	Chevrolet V8			12						12
18=	(United States) Dale White	Porsche 911 Carrera RSR	Porsche 3.8 L Flat-6		12							12
20	(United States) First Union	Porsche 911 Carrera RSR	Porsche 3.8 L Flat-6	11								11
