= 1997 IMSA GT Championship =

27th season of the racing series organized by IMSA

Seasons
- ← 1996 1998 →

The 1997 Exxon World Sports Car Championship and Supreme GT Series seasons were the 27th season of the IMSA GT Championship. It consisted of open-cockpit prototypes referred to as World Sports Car (WSC) and Grand Tourer-style racing cars divided into GTS-1, GTS-2, and GTS-3 classes.

It began February 1, 1997, and ended October 26, 1997, after eleven rounds. 1997 would mark the final year in IMSA GT for the 24 Hours of Daytona and the Six Hours of Watkins Glen. In 1998, the SCCA's revived United States Road Racing Championship would acquire the events.

== Schedule ==
Most races on the schedule ran with the GTS and WSC classes running separate races, sometimes with different lengths. Races marked with Both had both classes on track at the same time for the whole race.

Rnd	Race	Length	Class	Circuit	Date
1	Rolex 24 at Daytona	24 Hours	Both	Daytona International Speedway	February 1 February 2
2	Superflo 12 Hours of Sebring	12 Hours	Both	Sebring International Raceway	March 15
3	NAPA Grand Prix of Atlanta	2 Hours	GTS	Road Atlanta	April 19
3	NAPA Grand Prix of Atlanta	2 Hours	WSC	Road Atlanta	April 20
4	Dodge Dealers Grand Prix	1 Hour 45 Minutes	GTS	Lime Rock Park	May 26
4	Dodge Dealers Grand Prix	1 Hour 45 Minutes	WSC	Lime Rock Park	May 26
5	First Union Six Hours at the Glen	6 Hours	Both	Watkins Glen International	June 1
6	California Grand Prix	1 Hour 45 Minutes	GTS	Sears Point Raceway	July 13
6	California Grand Prix	2 Hours	WSC	Sears Point Raceway	July 13
7	Mosport Festival	1 Hour 45 Minutes	GTS	Mosport International Raceway	August 31
7	Mosport Festival	2 Hours	WSC	Mosport International Raceway	August 31
8	Sportscar Grand Prix	1 Hour 45 Minutes	GTS	Las Vegas Motor Speedway	September 20
8	Sportscar Grand Prix	2 Hours	WSC	Las Vegas Motor Speedway	September 20
9	Festival of Road Racing	2 Hours	WSC	Pikes Peak International Raceway	September 28
9	Festival of Road Racing	1 Hour 45 Minutes	GTS	Pikes Peak International Raceway	September 28
10	NAPA Sebring Octoberfest	2 Hours	WSC	Sebring International Raceway	October 18
10	NAPA Sebring Octoberfest	1 Hour 45 Minutes	GTS	Sebring International Raceway	October 18
11	Visa Sports Car Championship	1 Hour 45 Minutes	GTS	Laguna Seca Raceway	October 26
11	Visa Sports Car Championship	1 Hour 45 Minutes	WSC	Laguna Seca Raceway	October 26

== Season results ==
Rnd	Circuit	WSC Winning Team	GTS-1 Winning Team	GTS-2 Winning Team	GTS-3 Winning Team	Results
Rnd	Circuit	WSC Winning Drivers	GTS-1 Winning Drivers	GTS-2 Winning Drivers	GTS-3 Winning Drivers	Results
1	Daytona	(United States) #20 Dyson Racing	(United States) #01 Rohr Corp.	(Germany) #99 Roock Racing	(United States) #10 PTG	Results
1	Daytona	(United States) Elliott Forbes-Robinson (United States) John Schneider (United States) Rob Dyson (United States) John Paul Jr. (United States) Butch Leitzinger (United Kingdom) Andy Wallace (United Kingdom) James Weaver	(United States) Jochen Rohr (United States) Andy Pilgrim (Germany) Harald Grohs (Germany) Arnd Meier	(Germany) Ralf Kelleners (France) Patrice Goueslard (Germany) Claudia Hürtgen (Germany) André Ahrlé	(Costa Rica) Javier Quiros (United States) Derek Hill (United States) Boris Said (United States) Bill Auberlen (United States) Tom Hessert	Results
2	Sebring	(United States) #3 Team Scandia	(United States) #11 Robinson Racing	(Germany) #61 Konrad Motorsport	(United States) #10 PTG	Results
2	Sebring	(France) Yannick Dalmas (Sweden) Stefan Johansson (Spain) Fermín Vélez (United States) Andy Evans	(United States) Irv Hoerr (United States) Jack Baldwin (United States) George Robinson	(France) Bob Wollek (Austria) Franz Konrad (Germany) Wido Rössler	(Costa Rica) Javier Quiros (United States) Bill Auberlen (United States) Derek Hill (United States) Tom Hessert	Results
3	Road Atlanta	(United States) #16 Dyson Racing	(United States) #66 Panoz Motorsports	(United States) #99 Schumacher Racing	(United States) #39 Jim Matthews	Results
3	Road Atlanta	(United States) Butch Leitzinger (United Kingdom) James Weaver	(United States) Doc Bundy (United Kingdom) Andy Wallace	(United States) Larry Schumacher (United States) John O'Steen	(United States) Jim Matthews (United States) David Murry	Results
4	Lime Rock	(United States) #30 Moretti Racing	(United States) #91 Rock Valley	(United States) #99 Schumacher Racing	(United States) #6 PTG	Results
4	Lime Rock	(Brazil) Antônio Hermann (Italy) Andrea Montermini	(United States) Stu Hayner (United States) Roger Schramm	(United States) Larry Schumacher (United States) John O'Steen	(Costa Rica) Javier Quiros (United States) Derek Hill	Results
5	Watkins Glen	(United States) #16 Dyson Racing	(United States) #66 Panoz Motorsports	(Germany) #61 Konrad Motorsport	(United States) #77 Mattco Racing	Results
5	Watkins Glen	(United States) Elliott Forbes-Robinson (United States) Butch Leitzinger (United Kingdom) James Weaver	(United States) Doc Bundy (United Kingdom) Andy Wallace (Australia) David Brabham	(Austria) Franz Konrad (United States) Nick Ham (France) Michel Ligonnet	(United States) Pete Halsmer (United States) John Morton	Results
6	Sears Point	(United States) #16 Dyson Racing	(United States) #66 Panoz Motorsports	(Germany) #61 Konrad Motorsport	(United States) #10 PTG	Results
6	Sears Point	(United Kingdom) Andy Wallace (United Kingdom) James Weaver	(United States) Doc Bundy (United Kingdom) Andy Wallace	(Austria) Franz Konrad (United States) Nick Ham	(United States) Bill Auberlen (United States) Boris Said	Results
7	Mosport	(United States) #43 Central Arkansas Racing	(United States) #01 Rohr Motorsport	(Germany) #61 Konrad Motorsport	(United States) #6 PTG	Results
7	Mosport	(Canada) Ron Fellows (United States) Rob Morgan	(United States) Jochen Rohr (United States) Dorsey Schroeder (United States) Andy Pilgrim	(Austria) Franz Konrad (United States) Nick Ham	(Costa Rica) Javier Quiros (United States) Derek Hill	Results
8	Las Vegas	(United States) #20 Dyson Racing	(United States) #01 Rohr Motosport	(United States) #99 Schumacher Racing	(United States) #39 Jim Matthews	Results
8	Las Vegas	(United States) John Paul Jr. (United States) Butch Leitzinger	(United States) Andy Pilgrim (United Kingdom) Allan McNish	(United States) Larry Schumacher (United States) Price Cobb	(United States) Jim Matthews (United States) David Murry	Results
9	Pikes Peak	(United States) #30 Moretti Racing	(United States) #00 Rohr Motorsport	(Germany) #61 Konrad Motorsport	(United States) #10 PTG	Results
9	Pikes Peak	(Brazil) Antônio Hermann (Italy) Andrea Montermini	(United States) Andy Pilgrim (United Kingdom) Allan McNish	(Austria) Franz Konrad (United States) Nick Ham	(United States) Bill Auberlen (United States) Boris Said	Results
10	Sebring	(United States) #30 Moretti Racing	(United States) #01 Rohr Motorsport	(United States) #99 Schumacher Racing	(United States) #10 PTG	Results
10	Sebring	(Brazil) Antônio Hermann (Italy) Andrea Montermini	(United States) Andy Pilgrim (United Kingdom) Allan McNish	(United States) Larry Schumacher (United States) Price Cobb	(United States) Bill Auberlen (United States) Butch Leitzinger (Belgium) Marc Duez	Results
11	Laguna Seca	(United States) #20 Dyson Racing	(United States) #96 Panoz Motorsports	(Germany) #61 Konrad Motorsport	(United States) #7 PTG	Results
11	Laguna Seca	(United States) John Paul Jr. (United States) Butch Leitzinger	(France) Éric Bernard (Australia) David Brabham	(Austria) Franz Konrad (United States) Nick Ham	(Austria) Dieter Quester (Belgium) Marc Duez	Results

== Teams Championship ==
Points are awarded to the finishers in the following order:

- 25-21-19-17-15-14-13-12-11-10-...

Exception however for the 12 Hours of Sebring, which awarded in the following order:

- 30-26-24-22-20-19-18-17-16-15-...

And the 24 Hours of Daytona, which is awarded in the following order:

- 33-29-27-25-23-22-21-20-19-18-...

Teams only score the points of their highest finishing entry in each race.

=== WSC Standings ===
Pos	Team	Chassis	Engine	Rd 1	Rd 2	Rd 3	Rd 4	Rd 5	Rd 6	Rd 7	Rd 8	Rd 9	Rd 10	Rd 11	Total
1	(United States) Dyson Racing	Riley & Scott Mk III	Ford 5.0 L V8	33	26	25	21	25	25	21	25	19	19	25	264
2	(United States) Moretti Racing	Ferrari 333 SP	Ferrari F130E 4.0 L V12	25	14	19	25	6	14	17	19	25	25	21	210
3	(Peru) Dibos Racing	Riley & Scott Mk III; Ferrari 333 SP	Oldsmobile Aurora 4.0 L V8; Ferrari F310E 4.0 L V12	27	24	10	19	13	19	15	15	14	17	17	190
4	(United States) Doyle/Riley & Scott	Riley & Scott Mk III	Oldsmobile Aurora 4.0 L V8	20	13	14	10	7	11	19	21	21	5	19	160
5	(United States) Central Arkansas Racing	Ferrari 333 SP	Ferrari F310E 4.0 L V12			15	14	21	17	25	17	13	13	10	145
6	(United States) Downing Atlanta Racing	Kudzu DLM	Mazda 2.0 L 3-Rotor	23	22	13	7	15	10	12	11	10	10	8	141
7	(United States) FAB Factory Motorsport	Spice SC95; Kudzu DG-2	Oldsmobile Aurora 4.0 L V8; Buick 4.5 L V6	15	17	8	11	19	9	13	4	11	9	4	120
8	(United States) MSI Racing	Riley & Scott Mk III	Chevrolet 6.0 L V8	12	19	17		8	12	14	8	7	14		111
9	(United States) Support Net Racing	Hawk C-8; Riley & Scott Mk III	Chevrolet 6.0 L V8; Ford 5.0 L V8	21	16	3	12	12	6		2		12		96
10	(United States) Screaming Eagles Racing	Riley & Scott Mk III	Ford 5.0 L V8	14	18	9			13		13			12	79
11	(United States) Davin Racing	Argo P Kudzu DLM	BMW 4.0 L V8; Buick 4.5 L V6	17		4	6	5	2	7	10	8	8	2	69
12	(France) Courage Compétition	Courage C41	Oldsmobile Aurora 4.0 L V8	11		2	9			10	12	6	11	6	67
13	(United States) Team Scandia	Ferrari 333 SP	Ferrari F310E 4.0 L V12	29	30										59
14=	(United States) Kopf Precision Products	Keiler KII	Ford 5.0 L V8	18	11				8		3	5		11	56
14=	(United States) TRV Motorsports	Kudzu DL-4	Chevrolet 6.0 L V8	13		11	8		7			12		5	56
16	(United States) URD Rennwagenbau USA	URD WSC95	BMW 4.0 L V8				13	10					4	9	36
17	(Italy) Target 24	Riley & Scott Mk III	Oldsmobile Aurora 4.0 L V8	19										14	33
18	(United States) Team South Carolina	Hawk MD3R	Mazda 2.0 L 3-Rotor			6		17							23
19	(United Kingdom) Graham Williams	ProSport 3000	Ford 5.0 L V8	22											22
20	(United States) Fantasy Junction	Cannibal	Chevrolet 6.0L V8						4		9	4		3	20
21	(United States) John Christie	X-250	Ferrari F310E 4.0 L V12		10										10
22	(United States) Bill Dollahite	Spice BDG-02	Chevrolet 6.0 L V8								5				5
23	(United States) Wheel Works	Bennett Special MkII	Pontiac 5.0 L V8						3					1	4
