= Argo P =

- Category: WSC
- Constructor: Argo Racing Cars
- Successor: Kudzu DLM

Technical specifications
- Engine: BMW 3,982 cc (243.0 cu in) V8, naturally-aspirated, mid-engined
- Tyres: Goodyear

Competition history
- Notable entrants: Davin Racing
- Notable drivers: Mark Montgomery; Edd Davin; Butch Brickell
- Debut: 1997 24 Hours of Daytona
Races	Wins	Poles	F/Laps
6 (7 entries)	0	0	0
- Teams' Championships: 0
- Constructors' Championships: 0
- Drivers' Championships: 0

The Argo P was a sports prototype racing car, built by Argo Racing Cars in 1997 for the IMSA GT Championship. The car used a naturally-aspirated 4-litre BMW V8 engine throughout its racing life. The car proved to be uncompetitive, and its fastest race laps were frequently well off the pace of the other runners.

== Racing history ==
The Argo P made its competitive debut at the 24 Hours of Daytona in 1997, which was the opening round of the IMSA GT Championship; Davin Racing entered Mark Montgomery, Edd Davin and Butch Brickell in the car. It was not a successful debut; the car was still running at the end of the race, but it had only completed 279 laps, which saw the team finish 57th overall, and 11th in the WSC class. Davin and Montgomery were selected to drive the car in the following race, which was the 12 Hours of Sebring, but the team did not actually attend the event. The pair were also entered in the Grand Prix of Atlanta, but finished down in 16th; their fastest lap, a 1:26.699, was nearly six seconds slower than the next-slowest car. The Lime Rock Grand Prix was similarly unsuccessful; Montgomery and Davin finished 14th, and second-to-last, with a fastest lap that was 4.8 seconds slower than any other car. The team persevered with the car for the next event, which was the Six Hours at the Glen; an accident after 46 laps forced them out of the race, and resulted in Davin and Montgomery being classified 37th overall, and 15th in the WSC category. At the Californian Grand Prix, the car lasted for just eleven laps, before differential failure forced the team out, and saw them classified in 18th. Davin drove the Argo P on his own at the Mosport Festival, but steering failure after just one lap forced him to retire the car. After seven unsuccessful races, Davin Racing replaced the Argo P with a Buick-engined Kudzu DLM for the Grand Prix of Las Vegas, and the Argo P was never raced again.
