= Las Vegas Grand Prix (disambiguation) =

The Las Vegas Grand Prix is a Formula One Grand Prix.

Las Vegas Grand Prix may also refer to:

- IZOD IndyCar World Championships, an IndyCar and Champ Car race held at Las Vegas Motor Speedway
- Vegas Grand Prix, a Champ Car street race held near Fremont Street in 2007
- Caesars Palace Grand Prix, a Formula One race from 1981 to 1982 and CART race from 1983 to 1984
- Stardust Grand Prix, a Can-Am event held at Stardust International Raceway held from 1966 to 1968
- Grand Prix of Las Vegas, an IMSA/American Le Mans Series race held from 1997 to 2000
