= 1998 Nevada Grand Prix =

The 1998 Nevada Grand Prix (known as the 1998 Toshiba Copiers and Fax Nevada Grand Prix for sponsorship reasons) was the second race for the 1998 IMSA GT Championship season. It took place on April 26, 1998, at Las Vegas Motor Speedway and ran for three hours and 45 minutes.

== Official results ==
Class winners in bold.

Pos	Class	No	Team	Drivers	Chassis	Tyre	Laps
Pos	Class	No	Team	Drivers	Engine	Tyre	Laps
1	**WSC**	**7**	**(United States) Doyle-Risi Racing**	**(Belgium) Eric van de Poele** **(South Africa) Wayne Taylor**	**Ferrari 333 SP**	**P**	**176**
1	**WSC**	**7**	**(United States) Doyle-Risi Racing**	**(Belgium) Eric van de Poele** **(South Africa) Wayne Taylor**	**Ferrari F310E 4.0 L V12**	**P**	**176**
2	**GT1**	**4**	**(United States) Panoz Motorsports**	**(United Kingdom) Andy Wallace** **(Australia) David Brabham**	**Panoz GTR-1**	**MI**	**176**
2	**GT1**	**4**	**(United States) Panoz Motorsports**	**(United Kingdom) Andy Wallace** **(Australia) David Brabham**	**Ford (Roush) 6.0 L V8**	**MI**	**176**
3	WSC	63	(United States) Downing Atlanta	(United States) Chris Ronson (United States) Jim Downing	Kudzu DLM-4	**G**	163
3	WSC	63	(United States) Downing Atlanta	(United States) Chris Ronson (United States) Jim Downing	Mazda R26B 2.6 L 4-Rotor	**G**	163
4	**GT2**	**6**	**(United States) Prototype Technology Group**	**(United Kingdom) Andy Pilgrim** **(United States) Boris Said** **(United States) Bill Auberlen**	**BMW M3**	**Y**	**160**
4	**GT2**	**6**	**(United States) Prototype Technology Group**	**(United Kingdom) Andy Pilgrim** **(United States) Boris Said** **(United States) Bill Auberlen**	**BMW 3.2 L I6**	**Y**	**160**
5	**GT3**	**10**	**(United States) Prototype Technology Group**	**(United States) Bill Auberlen** **(United States) Mark Simo** **(Belgium) Marc Duez**	**BMW M3**	**Y**	**160**
5	**GT3**	**10**	**(United States) Prototype Technology Group**	**(United States) Bill Auberlen** **(United States) Mark Simo** **(Belgium) Marc Duez**	**BMW 3.2 L I6**	**Y**	**160**
6	GT3	1	(United States) Prototype Technology Group	(Canada) Ross Bentley (United States) Peter Cunningham	BMW M3	**Y**	159
6	GT3	1	(United States) Prototype Technology Group	(Canada) Ross Bentley (United States) Peter Cunningham	BMW 3.2 L I6	**Y**	159
7	GT3	17	(United States) AASCO Performance	(United States) Tom Peterson (United States) Dennis Aase	Porsche 911 Carrera RSR	**P**	159
7	GT3	17	(United States) AASCO Performance	(United States) Tom Peterson (United States) Dennis Aase	Porsche 3.8 L Flat-6	**P**	159
8	GT3	23	(United States) Alex Job Racing	(United States) Cort Wagner (United States) Darryl Havens	Porsche 964 Carrera RSR	**P**	158
8	GT3	23	(United States) Alex Job Racing	(United States) Cort Wagner (United States) Darryl Havens	Porsche 3.8 L Flat-6	**P**	158
9	GT3	41	(United States) Technodyne	(United States) Chris Cervelli (United States) Bruce Busby	Porsche 911 Carrera RSR	?	157
9	GT3	41	(United States) Technodyne	(United States) Chris Cervelli (United States) Bruce Busby	Porsche 3.8 L Flat-6	?	157
10	GT3	76	(United States) Team A.R.E.	(United States) Mike Doolin (United States) Scott Peeler	Porsche 993 Carrera RSR	**Y**	157
10	GT3	76	(United States) Team A.R.E.	(United States) Mike Doolin (United States) Scott Peeler	Porsche 3.8 L Flat-6	**Y**	157
11	GT2	99	(United States) Schumacher Racing	(United States) Larry Schumacher (United States) Martin Snow	Porsche 911 GT2	**P**	156
11	GT2	99	(United States) Schumacher Racing	(United States) Larry Schumacher (United States) Martin Snow	Porsche 3.6 L Flat-6	**P**	156
12	GT3	55	(United States) AASCO Performance	(United States) Tim Ralston (Costa Rica) Jorge Trejos	Porsche 911 Carrera RSR	**P**	154
12	GT3	55	(United States) AASCO Performance	(United States) Tim Ralston (Costa Rica) Jorge Trejos	Porsche 3.8 L Flat-6	**P**	154
13	WSC	29	(United States) Intersport Racing	(United States) Joaquin DeSoto (United States) John Mirro	Spice SC95	**G**	154
13	WSC	29	(United States) Intersport Racing	(United States) Joaquin DeSoto (United States) John Mirro	Oldsmobile Aurora 4.0 L V8	**G**	154
14	GT3	25	(United States) Dale White	(United States) Dale White (United States) Don Kitch (United States) Michael Petersen	Porsche 911 Carrera RSR	?	150
14	GT3	25	(United States) Dale White	(United States) Dale White (United States) Don Kitch (United States) Michael Petersen	Porsche 3.8 L Flat-6	?	150
15 DNF	WSC	28	(United States) Intersport Racing	(United States) Jon Field (United States) Rick Sutherland (United States) Butch Brickell	Riley & Scott Mk III	**G**	149
15 DNF	WSC	28	(United States) Intersport Racing	(United States) Jon Field (United States) Rick Sutherland (United States) Butch Brickell	Ford 5.0 L V8	**G**	149
16	GT1	5	(United States) Panoz Motorsports	(Brazil) Raul Boesel (France) Éric Bernard	Panoz GTR-1	**MI**	148
16	GT1	5	(United States) Panoz Motorsports	(Brazil) Raul Boesel (France) Éric Bernard	Ford (Roush) 6.0 L V8	**MI**	148
17	WSC	60	(United States) Kopf Race Products	(United States) Kris Wilson (United States) Shane Donley	Keiler KII	**G**	135
17	WSC	60	(United States) Kopf Race Products	(United States) Kris Wilson (United States) Shane Donley	Ford 5.0 L V8	**G**	135
18 DNF	WSC	39	(United States) Matthews-Colucci Racing	(United States) David Murry (United States) Jim Matthews	Riley & Scott Mk III	**P**	82
18 DNF	WSC	39	(United States) Matthews-Colucci Racing	(United States) David Murry (United States) Jim Matthews	Ford 5.0 L V8	**P**	82
19 DNF	GT1	2	(United States) Mosler Automotive	(United States) Shane Lewis (United States) Vic Rice	Mosler Raptor	**P**	38
19 DNF	GT1	2	(United States) Mosler Automotive	(United States) Shane Lewis (United States) Vic Rice	Chevrolet 6.3 L V8	**P**	38
20 DNF	WSC	88	(United States) Dollahite Racing	(United States) Bill Dollahite (United States) Mike Davies	Spice BDG-02	?	30
20 DNF	WSC	88	(United States) Dollahite Racing	(United States) Bill Dollahite (United States) Mike Davies	Chevrolet 6.0 L V8	?	30
21 DNF	GT2	15	(United States) American Spirit Racing	(United States) Bill Eagle (United States) Dorsey Schroeder	Vector M12	**G**	2
21 DNF	GT2	15	(United States) American Spirit Racing	(United States) Bill Eagle (United States) Dorsey Schroeder	Lamborghini 5.7 L V12	**G**	2

=== Statistics ===
- Pole Position - #7 Doyle-Risi Racing - 1:10.198
- Fastest lap - #4 Panoz Motorsports - 1:11.233
