= Las Vegas Motor Speedway =

Motorsport track in the United States

America's Racing Showplace

- Tri-Oval (1996–present)
- Location: 7000 North Las Vegas Boulevard; Las Vegas, Nevada, United States
- Coordinates: 36°16′17″N 115°00′40″W
- Capacity: 80,000
- Owner: Speedway Motorsports (1999–present)
- Broke ground: 24 February 1971; 55 years ago (track complex)
- Opened: 16 May 1971; 55 years ago (track complex)
- Construction cost: US$1 million (initial track complex); US$72 million (main track)
- Former names: Las Vegas Speedway Park (1993–1996); Las Vegas Speedway (1992); Las Vegas International Speedway (1990–1992); Las Vegas International Speedrome (1971–1990)
- Major events: Current: NASCAR Cup Series; Pennzoil 400 (1998–present); South Point 400 (2018–present); NASCAR O'Reilly Auto Parts Series; The LiUNA! (1997–present); Focused Health 302 (2018–present); Formula D (2008–2012, 2026); Future: MotoAmerica (1996–1998, 2027); Former: NASCAR Truck Series; Ecosave 200 (2018–2025); Victoria's Voice Foundation 200 (1996–1999, 2001–2021); IndyCar; IZOD IndyCar World Championship (1996–2000, 2011); American Le Mans Series; Grand Prix of Las Vegas (1997–2000); Indy Autonomous Challenge (2022–2025); Champ Car World Series (2004–2005); GT World Challenge America (2000, 2019); Trans-Am Series (2000)
- Website: lvms.com

Tri-Oval (1996–present)
- Surface: Asphalt
- Length: 1.500 mi (2.414 km)
- Banking: Turns: 20° Frontstretch: 9° Backstretch: 9°
- Race lap record: 0:24.636 (219.192 mph (352.755 km/h)) ( (United States) Richie Hearn, Reynard 95I, 1996, IRL)

The Bullring Oval (1985–present)
- Length: 0.375 mi (0.604 km)

Long Road Course (1996–present)
- Length: 2.499 mi (4.022 km)
- Race lap record: 1:32.873 ( (Spain) Miguel Molina, Ferrari 488 GT3, 2019, GT3)

Medium Road Course (1996–present)
- Length: 2.150 mi (3.460 km)
- Race lap record: 1:08.273 ( (United Kingdom) Allan McNish, Audi R8, 2000, LMP900)

Short Road Course (1996–present)
- Length: 1.938 mi (3.119 km)
- Race lap record: 1:06.019 ( (United States) Butch Leitzinger, Riley & Scott Mk III, 1997, WSC)

Las Vegas Motor Speedway is a 1.500 mi (2.414 km) tri-oval intermediate speedway in Las Vegas, Nevada, United States. The track complex has hosted various major racing events since its opening, including NASCAR, IndyCar, and Champ Car. The venue has a capacity of 80,000 as of 2023. The track's complex features various adjacent tracks, including a 0.375 mi (0.604 km) oval, a 0.500 mi (0.805 km) clay oval, and a road course with multiple layouts. The main track also features an infield road course that is used for sports car racing. The facility is owned by Speedway Motorsports, LLC (SMI) and led by track general manager Patrick Lindsey.

After the closure of Stardust International Raceway in 1971, plans were made to build a new road course and drag strip in North Las Vegas by Craig Road Speedway owner Curly Price on city of Las Vegas-owned land. The then-named Las Vegas Speedrome was completed in 1972, with preliminary races being held before in 1971; however, the track fell quickly into disrepair. The track was revived by drag racer Alex Rodriguez and his son for most of the 1980s. During Rodriguez's tenure, a 0.375 mi (0.604 km) oval was added in 1985, which is now known as The Bullring. In 1989, Richie Clyne, the director of the Imperial Palace Hotel's (now called The Linq) automobile museum, bought the complex from the city. By the mid-1990s, Clyne, Imperial Palace owner Ralph Engelstad, and Sahara Hotel owner Bill Bennett announced plans to build a 1.500 mi (2.414 km) oval on the track's complex, which was completed in 1996. In 1998, SMI and its founder Bruton Smith bought the complex.

== Description ==
=== Configurations ===
Las Vegas Motor Speedway (LVMS) in its current form is measured at 1.500 mi (2.414 km), with 20 degrees of banking in the turns and nine degrees of banking on the track's frontstretch and backstretch. Before 2006, the track had 12 degrees of banking in the turns. Different measurements have been used; in 2011, the IndyCar Series utilized a length of 1.544 mi (2.485 km). Within the main track's frontstretch, there is a 1/4 mile (0.40 km) oval that was built in 2006. Within the track's infield, there is a road course complex that was built as part of the track's construction in 1996. The track has also used a "roval" layout during select races.

=== Amenities ===
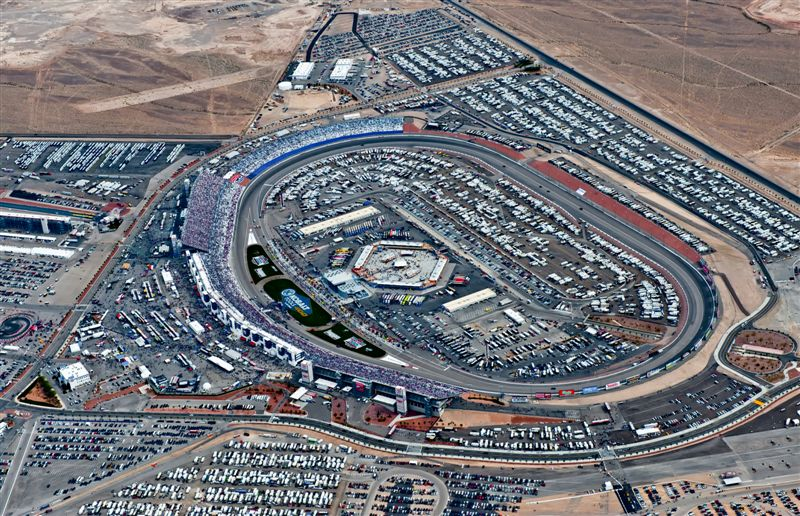
An overhead picture of Las Vegas Motor Speedway taken in 2011.

LVMS is located in Las Vegas, Nevada, in-between Interstate 15 and Las Vegas Boulevard. At its peak, the track held over 140,000 seats. As of 2023, according to the Las Vegas Sun, the Las Vegas Motor Speedway has a stated capacity of 80,000. At the time of the track complex's opening, it was situated upon 200 acres of land with a capacity of 3,000. The complex has since expanded extensively, and as of 2015 is situated upon over 1,200 acres of land according to the Las Vegas Review-Journal.

Numerous amenities exist on the track's complex; most of which were built as part of a 2006 renovation project on the track. As part of the 2006 renovations, the track built a redesigned, interactive garage that is known as the Neon Garage that spectators could access for an extra fee during race weekends. A three-story, 60,000 square-foot media center, currently known as the LocaliQ Digital Center for sponsorship reasons, was also constructed in 2006 within the track's infield. A 127-unit condominium tower was also slated to be built overlooking the track's first turn; however, the plan saw opposition from Nellis Air Force Base and United States Air Force officials, who did regular flight training and drills near the track, later clarifying that it was due to safety risks. Although SMI CEO Bruton Smith initially refused to comply, he relented after the Air Force lobbied the Clark County government to refuse the lodging.

==== Adjacent tracks ====
The track complex features numerous adjacent tracks; two of which were built before the main track. In 1985, the complex built a 0.33 mi (0.53 km) oval that was assisted with donations of barriers that were used in the Caesars Palace Grand Prix. In 2000, the track was modified to become 0.375 mi (0.604 km) and was renamed the "Bullring". A 0.500 mi (0.805 km) clay dirt oval opened in November 1996, hosting a World of Outlaws event.

As part of the track complex's initial opening, the complex built a drag strip, which opened in 1972. In 1999, in the aftermath of Smith buying out the track, the track announced a new 0.250 mi (0.402 km) to replace the original strip built in 1972. The new drag strip opened in April 2000, being named "The Strip". In 2017, the drag strip was expanded to four lanes.

== Track history ==
=== Complex planning and construction ===
On August 14, 1970, the Las Vegas Review-Journal reported that businessman Carl "Curly" Price was aiming to sign a lease for a plot of land near Nellis Air Force Base from the City of Las Vegas to build a drag strip, a "small" road course, and a proposed oval. The proposal received an endorsement from the Review-Journal, which wrote "We hope Curly can get on this since [North Las Vegas] badly needs a motor sports complex", stating a lack of proper racing facilities. By February 1971, the complex, initially known as the Las Vegas Motor Speedway, was being built with "work [progressing] daily".

=== Track complex's early years ===
On May 16, 1971, the complex was recorded to have held its first races on a 1/2 mile (0.80 km) dirt oval, sanctioned by the Southern Nevada Off Road Enthusiasts (SNORE). By July, the Clark County government approved plans to create an oval and a drag strip. In August, SNORE held another event, this time opening a 0.750 mi (1.207 km) buggy course. In December, Price announced that the track would hold its first drag strip event in January 1972. In December 1971, Larry Horten announced a bid to rival Price's track named the Las Vegas Raceway Park, seeking approval from the Clark County Board of County Commissioners for a 520-acre plot of land that was also directly near Nellis AFB. However, on December 21, the board rejected Horten's plan.

The now-named Las Vegas International Speedrome's drag strip held its first races on February 26, 1972, on the 0.250 mi (0.402 km) to host the first day of the National Hot Rod Association (NHRA) Open Drag Championships. By May, the International Motorsports Association scheduled races for the rest of the year at the complex's 1.600 mi (2.575 km) road course. However, by August, the track was displaying issues; the lighting system on the track's road course was reported to malfunction during races. In September, the West Charleston Lions Club of Las Vegas signed a 15-year agreement to run the drag strip.

=== Price's legal troubles ===
After 1972, almost all major racing, especially drag racing, ceased due to mainly financial issues; though, this was disputed by businessmen Ted Wiens and Mike Sellers. Although the track still held small local events before, the track did not see any major racing until May 19, 1974. By August, the financial situation had gotten so dire that local drag racers were pushing their profits to try and revitalize the track. In October, the complex aimed to host bi-monthly drag strip races, hoping to gain profits from frequently occurring local events, along with forming the Speedrome Racing Association to conduct the rest of its races. In 1975, the track was used as the starting point for the Mint 400. In September of that year, the NHRA returned, with the complex holding its first major drag racing event in almost three years.

On September 17, the city of Las Vegas considered revoking Price's lease, with stated reasons including that Price owed around $3,400 on monthly payments, increased cases of vandalism to both the track and the Price's machinery, and angry residents stealing bleachers; a final decision was set to come on October 1. Although Price was able to pay back at least some of the rent, after a delay that moved the decision to December 16, Price forfeited his lease after failing to stockpile 35,000 cubic yards of gravel. However, he was given another chance. In July 1976, his lease was officially terminated after failing to maintain the stockpile of gravel needed in Price's contract. The next month, Price gave scathing comments to the city in an interview with the Review-Journal, reporting a lack of police response with vandalism and high costs and labor to maintain the gravel stockpile. The next year, the termination was finally approved by Clark County District judge Howard Babcock, immediately ordered Price to vacate the land and to pay $22,140 for failing to maintain his contract and unpaid rent. However, Price was still the operator, and a decision to remove him from the position was delayed. In October, Price stated plans of appealing to the Supreme Court of Nevada, which would essentially kill all racing at the track complex for an extended period of time. In November, he confirmed this decision. Later that month, the city of Las Vegas temporarily leased the complex out to Show & Go Ltd. until the end of the year.

=== Attempts at a revival, new track, more issues ===
Just before the end of 1977, the track was temporarily leased out for the first three months of 1978 to car clubs. In February 1978, Bob Van Norman, owner of the Craig Road Speedway, submitted a proposal to take over the complex from the city, offering a proposal of $300 a month to lease the complex. However, the proposal was withdrawn just over a week later, claiming that he did not want to be accused of favoritism from the city; the withdrawal was considered a big blow by the city to repair the track, with the city claiming that the track could not see any serious proposals for racing in the next 18 months. However, by June, the complex was able to hold the Silverbird Race of Champions, a race that featured numerous movie stars; however, the race flopped, seeing a lack of spectators. By January 1979, the city of Las Vegas began looking for potential leasers, with the complex costing the city thousands of dollars. Later that month, a group of five businessmen, including Van Norman and Horten, formed Las Vegas Recreation, Inc. in efforts to make a bid on temporary ownership for the track. On February 21, the city's commission unanimously approved the lease, essentially reviving the complex; however, the permanent lease was not guaranteed until the Nevada Supreme Court's case with Price was settled.

By April, Review-Journal writer Mike Henle considered the track revived after "seven years of relative silence", with events scheduled for the next six months. In September, the complex grew to holding concerts. However, the concerts drew criticism from local government and local reporters for excessive violence, drug use, and underage drinking. Criticism grew so much that commissioner Ron Lurie considered revoking the complex's operating permit. In February 1980, Price lost his appeal, with future bids expected to take place the following year. The next month, Las Vegas Recreation's lease was extended until the end of 1980. However, by November 5, the partnership gave up after "several months of horrible luck", with poor timing systems, lighting, and the amount of effort required to maintain the complex being key issues.

The next day, businessmen Terry Ainsworth and Harold Ellis signed a 10-year lease with the city to lease the complex. Although the complex was able to see off-road racing, management problems soon plagued the complex; by August, Ellis began looking for a new partner to replace Ainsworth. As a result, Alex Rodriguez, a drag strip driver, sent pleas to fellow Las Vegan racers to come to meetings set up by him to try and clean up the facility. Rodriguez and his son, Alex Rodriguez Jr., were later appointed by the city to replace Ainsworth, due to the partnership being strained between the two. Rodriguez, within the first months, invested $75,000 on improvements and a repave of the track. Drag racing saw an overall uptick; Mike Henle viewed Rodriguez so highly that he declared, "Rodriguez has done a commendable job – and drag racing is up from the canvas because of him".

In 1982, Van Norman gave up ownership of the Craig Road Speedway to First Interstate Bank due to satisfy debts from his family business, leaving the local stock car racing community without a track. Van Norman stated that he hoped Rodriguez would build a paved oval like Craig Road Speedway at LVIS' complex. In 1984, LVIS opted to host stock car racing events, essentially reviving the local stock car racing community after a year of relative silence. In 1985, the track built a new 0.333 mi (0.536 km) oval, using donations of old Caesars Palace Grand Prix barriers to build the track. The oval opened in November of that year. By 1987, with Rodriguez investing over $500,000 into the complex, the complex was regarded highly, including receiving honors from the NHRA as one of the best facilities in the United States. That same year, the complex announced plans to repave the road course with help from the Sports Car Club of America.

In March 1988, the city council considered revoking Rodriguez's lease, accusing him of not paying rent and for selling food without proper sales tax permits. Rodriguez Jr. later admitted to it, blaming his father because he both left the United States for two years and was going through a divorce. The city approved terminating the lease; however, he was still able to operate the track until December 1990. In addition, the city was now also considering selling off the land to a private operator. The sale was approved on November 17. Rodriguez defended himself, stating the improvements he made to the track; however, the track was still put up for sale on the condition that the buyer must maintain the track for 10 years.

=== Richie Clyne and David Juberg era ===
In May 1989, the track complex was sold to Richie Clyne, the director of the Imperial Palace Hotel's (now called The Linq) automobile museum, for $1,070,000. Clyne and investor G. Robert Diero stated hopes of completely revamping what they declared as a dangerous and worn-out complex. Along with the purchase, the track complex was renamed to the Las Vegas International Raceway. By the beginning of 1990, the Las Vegas Speedrome gained a reputation for being "old, dirty, and tattered". At this point, little hope was shown for the track's revival; Review-Journal writer Greg Bortolin estimated millions of dollars for renovations to attract major racing leagues, with no guarantee of interest as at the time, the University of Nevada, Las Vegas' (UNLV) sports teams were the only major sports events in the city. In interviews with track media manager Neal Reid, Clyne stated that he initially wanted to turn the area into an industrial park, but was convinced otherwise by motorsport businessmen Bob Bahre and Tom Wheatcroft. The track held its first races under Clyne's leadership with the newly rebranded Nissan 400 (now known as the Mint 400). By 1991, the complex aimed to expand its events, along with general renovations to the complex. In 1993, David Juberg and Craig Graham, both amateur racers, took over a lease from Clyne to run the track complex. That same year, the complex was renamed to the Las Vegas Speedway Park by Juberg. In May, the duo took over the master lease to the track from Tom Villardi. Around this time, the track still had no major events, including off-road racing due to environmental concerns.

==== Las Vegas Motor Speedway planning and construction, first races at LVMS ====
Around 1993, the Review-Journal reported that Clyne was researching the feasibility of building a NASCAR-style superspeedway. On October 16, 1994, the Review-Journal reported that Clyne and Juberg were interested in making a bid for a modern racing facility. At the same time, longtime motorsports businessman Bruton Smith, with the success of his newly formed Speedway Motorsports, Inc. (SMI), announced plans to build a $75 million facility west of the Mississippi River. According to one of the people who ventured with Smith to scout a location, racing promoter Eddie Gossage, Smith initially preferred building a track in Las Vegas. He considered a location adjacent to the Las Vegas Speedway Park; however, he later found out that the parcel of land was owned by Imperial Palace Hotel owner Ralph Engelstad. According to Gossage, the two were friends, and as Engelstad had sought the land first, he agreed with Engelstad to not prospect the land further.

After Bruton Smith announced his plans to build what would eventually become the Texas Motor Speedway, the Review-Journal reported that chances for a modern racing facility in Las Vegas were all but killed. However, on November 30, Clyne announced plans to build his own $65–70 million, 100,000-seat facility near the Las Vegas Speedway Park that would be capable of holding NASCAR Winston Cup Series races, with an opening date scheduled for April 1, 1996. By the next day, Clyne also announced the renovations of all tracks within the complex. In January 1995, he officially confirmed plans to build the track along Interstate 15 on a 1,100 acre plot of land, along with a 40-acre industrial park; the original plan Clyne had for the track. However, Winston Cup dates were not guaranteed; NASCAR leadership, including Mike Helton, insisted that though numerous modern facilities were being built, such as ones in Texas and Las Vegas, "the Cup schedule can't grow much more". By May, Clyne and IndyCar Series president Tony George officially announced a 200 miles (320 km) race to christen the track, to be held on September 15, 1996.

By August, construction was underway for the track, with a private opening for tire testing scheduled in May. Three months later, new NASCAR Craftsman Truck Series races were added, with construction being "right on schedule". In January 1996, the track named Ray Wilkings as the general manager. By the end of February, LVMS was viewed optimistically; the track was projected to bring in over $890 million to the Las Vegas economy, with paving of the racing surface scheduled in March. In April, Clyne bought out the Las Vegas Speedway Park from Juberg, placing it directly under the Las Vegas Motor Speedway name. The next month, Engelstad was revealed by Smith to be funding the majority of the project, something that Clyne did not either confirm or deny. Construction saw no major issues throughout its duration; but, further construction for the next five years was announced by Clyne in early September in order to finish the track. By that same month, Sahara Hotel owner Bill Bennett also joined as part owner of the track.

LVMS officially opened to the public on September 13, 1996 for IndyCar practice. Its first race, according to Review-Journal writer John Katsilometes, was "violent", with the race being marred by heavy winds and numerous crashes. In spite of traffic issues, the track saw double than what was expected, with a reported 67,132 attending the race. Two months later, the track held its first NASCAR Craftsman Truck Series race. The next year, the track hosted its first NASCAR Busch Series race. In the same year, the facility won rights to host a NASCAR Winston Cup Series race weekend for the 1998 season.

=== Purchase by Bruton Smith, expansion and subsequent decline ===
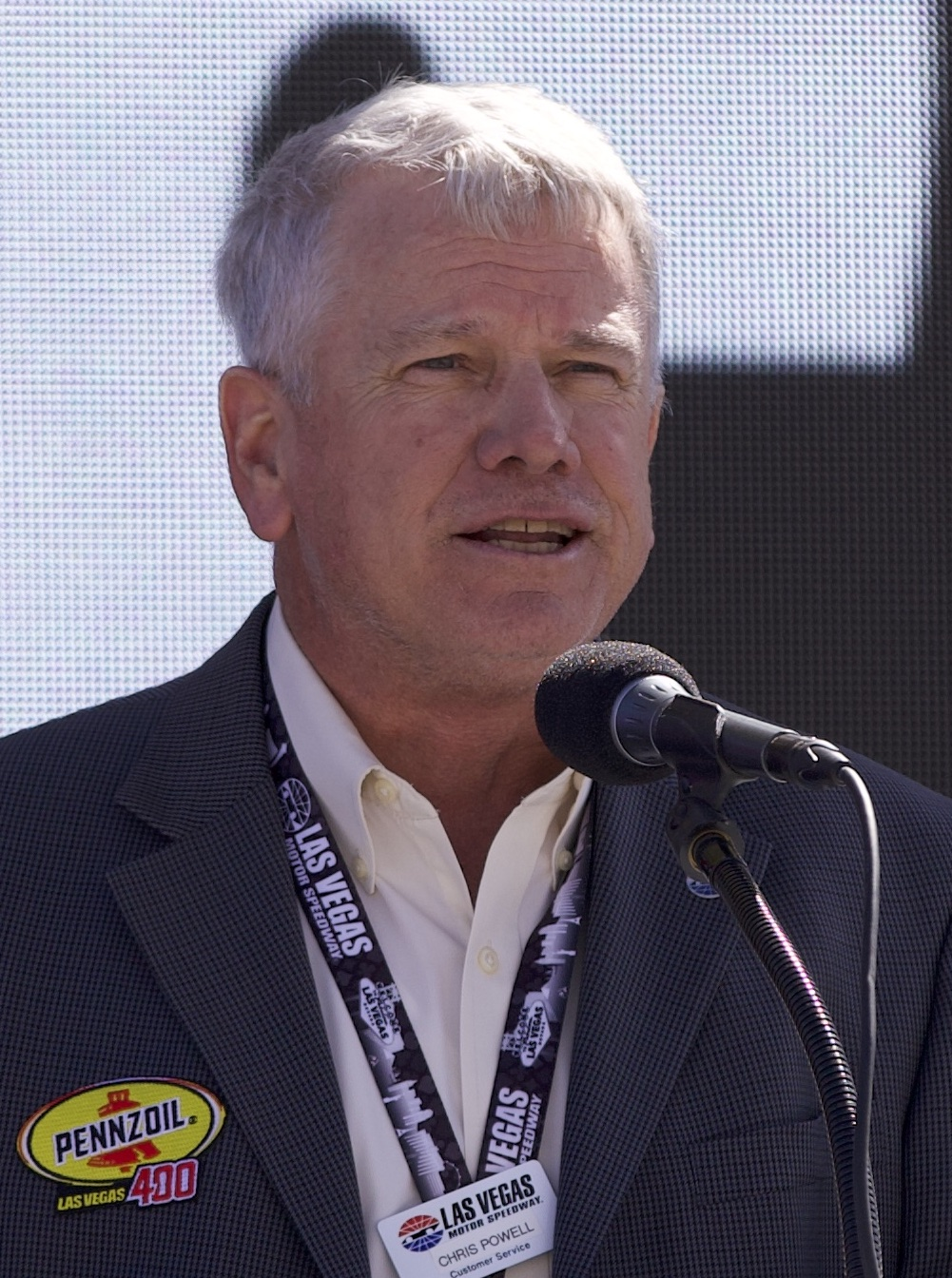
Chris Powell (pictured in 2024) was the general manager of Las Vegas Motor Speedway from 1998 to 2025.

In December 1998, Bruton Smith announced plans to buy out LVMS and its complex for around $215 million, with Smith stating to renovate amenities with the purchase and to sell off 300 acres of industrial space. He later appointed Chris Powell, a former media relations manager for the NASCAR Winston Cup Series and the R. J. Reynolds Tobacco Company as the track's general manager. In 2000, LVMS officials modified its 0.375 mi (0.604 km) oval and renamed it the "Bullring".

In 2006, Powell announced a $25-27 million renovation project that aimed to overhaul the existing track. Major changes announced in the press release included changing the banking in the turns from 12 to 20 degrees, increasing capacity to 141,000, a new infield media center, a redesigned garage, and narrowing the racing surface to 50 feet; a 20 feet difference. The track changes were met with mixed reviews at the time; drivers Jeff Burton, Kyle Busch, and Tony Stewart all criticized the changes, in contrast to Review-Journal writer Ron Kantowski, who praised the changes and Bruton Smith. In 2011, the track won rights to host the flagship branch of Electric Daisy Carnival (EDC) after EDC oversaw controversy in its previous location, Los Angeles. That same year, the track experienced its first fatal auto racing accident when longtime IndyCar driver Dan Wheldon died in an accident in the 2011 IZOD IndyCar World Championship on the race's 11th lap. In 2017, the drag strip was expanded to four lanes to accommodate four cars racing at once. In 2018, the track won rights to host another NASCAR Cup Series weekend in the fall.

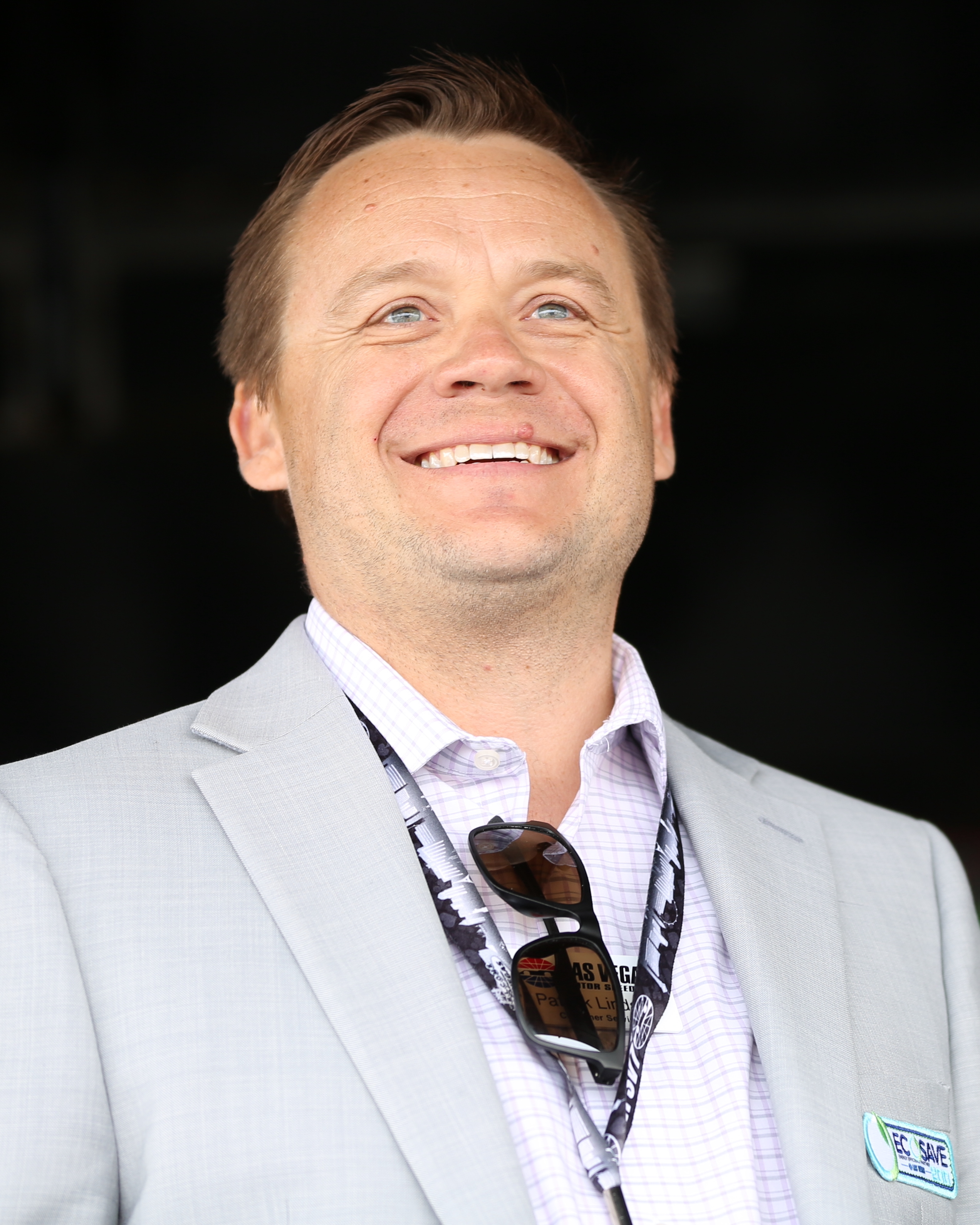
Patrick Lindsey (pictured in 2025) has served as the track's general manager since 2025.

Since the mid-2010s, the track has decreased its capacity multiple times. In 2015, the track announced the removal of 15,000 seats in the third and fourth turns to make way for RV parking. In 2017, the track decreased capacity to around 80,000 seats to make way for increased premium seating options. Two years later, the Review-Journal reported another significant decrease in capacity, with the track refusing to state the exact amount of seats that were still remaining; the report came after the track recorded its lowest attendance recorded for a NASCAR Cup Series race at the 2018 South Point 400. In 2025, Powell announced his retirement as general manager of LVMS following the 2025 Pennzoil 400, with Shriners Children's Open executive director Patrick Lindsey named as his successor.

== Events ==
=== Auto racing ===
==== NASCAR ====
The track hosts two annual NASCAR race weekends, highlighted by the NASCAR Cup Series' spring Pennzoil 400 and fall South Point 400. It also hosts the NASCAR O'Reilly Auto Parts Series, including the spring LiUNA! 300 and the fall Focused Health 302. The track formerly hosted the NASCAR Craftsman Truck Series' Ecosave 200.

==== Open-wheel racing ====
The track hosted its first IndyCar races in September 1996, the first major races ever ran at the track. Until 2000, the Indy Racing League ran an IndyCar race at the track annually. In 2004, despite Championship Auto Racing Teams (CART) going bankrupt, the track aimed to still host a race at the track. After a change in ownership, the newly-named Champ Car World Series announced races at the track on July 7, with the race occurring on September 25. Champ Car ran another race in 2005 before refusing to renew for 2006.

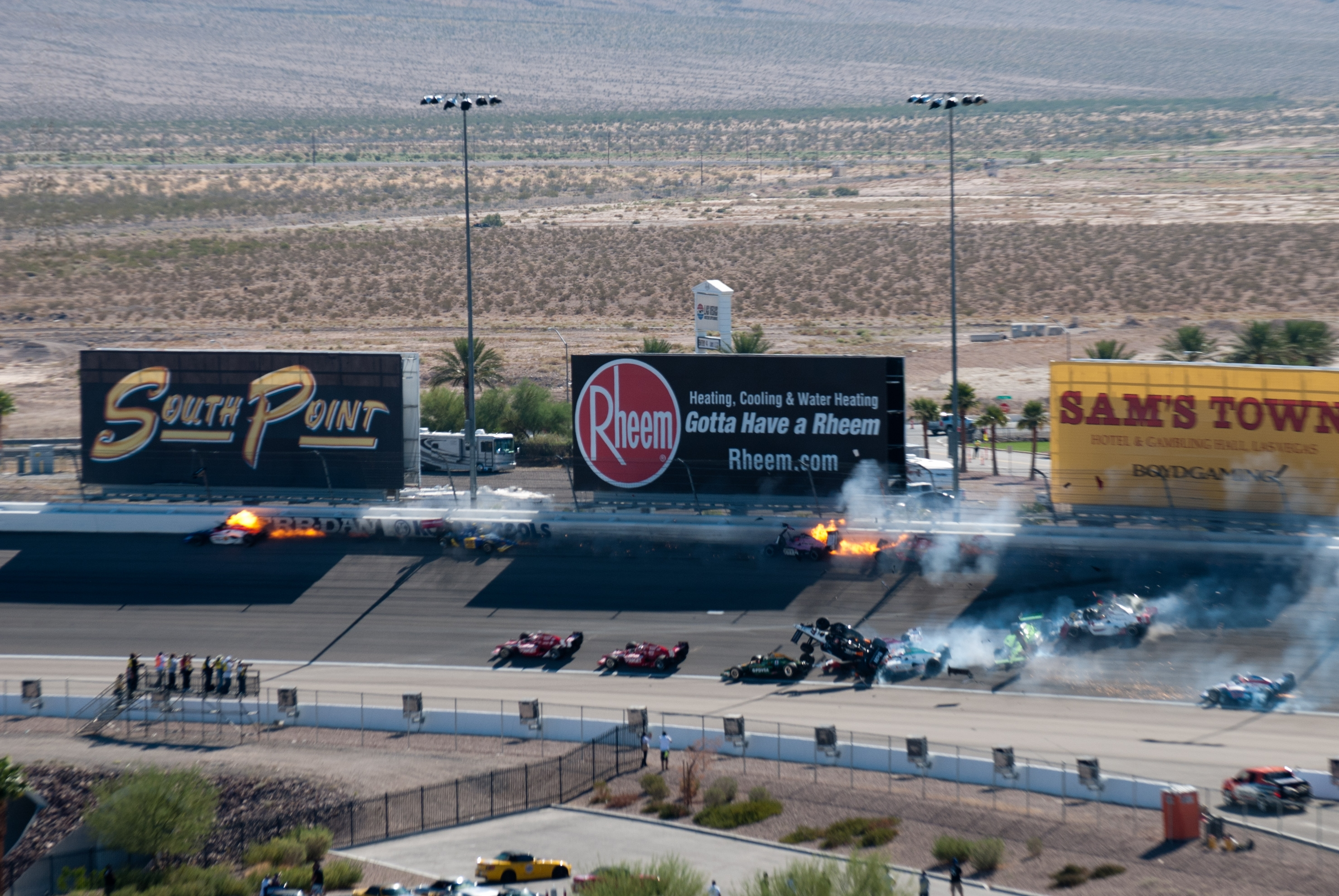
The lap 11 crash at the 2011 IZOD IndyCar World Championship. The crash took the life of Dan Wheldon, which led to the cancelling of the race and scrapped any future normal human-driven IndyCar races at the track.

In 2011, the track was slated to run the IZOD IndyCar World Championship to become the season finale of that year's season, with the IndyCar Series' CEO, Randy Bernard, stating that he hoped it would become a major IndyCar event. To try to increase the race's stakes and to promote the event, Bernard put up a $5 million bounty to any non-IndyCar driver who could win the race. However, after numerous drivers rejected it, the challenge was placed onto part-time driver Dan Wheldon, who had to start last. On lap 11 of the race, a crash involving 15 cars, including Wheldon, occurred. Wheldon died due to sustaining massive head injuries during the crash. IndyCar cancelled the race in the wake of Wheldon's death. As a result of Wheldon's death, the track and Speedway Motorsports requested a buyout of their contract with IndyCar, cancelling their IndyCar races in 2012.

IndyCar returned to Las Vegas Motor Speedway in 2022 with an event held as part of the Consumer Electronics Show (CES) titled the Indy Autonomous Challenge. The contest features teams of college students engineering a modified Indy NXT based car in a series of driving and passing challenges for driverless vehicles.

==== Other racing events ====
The half-mile dirt track hosted the World of Outlaws Sprint Car Series from 1996 to 2006 and from 2009 to 2019. High Limit Racing also ran at the venue in 2025 on the NASCAR Cup weekend.

In 2014, the track hosted a race for the Red Bull Air Race World Championship; however, the race was abandoned due to bad weather conditions, with results being based on qualifying speeds. The track hosted a race for the 2015 season, this time managing to actually run the event. In 2016, the track was scheduled to run the event, but high winds forced the cancellation of the entire event.

=== Festivals ===
In 2011, the Electric Daisy Carnival moved its flagship location to the track from Los Angeles following controversies of rampant underage drug use in Los Angeles, which led to the injuries of numerous people and the death of a 15-year-old. The track has held the event annually since.

=== Other events ===
In 2013, the track hosted the World Long Drive Championship. In 2020, in the wake of the COVID-19 pandemic, the track held a graduation ceremony for Faith Lutheran High School, a private Lutheran school based in Summerlin. Since 2023, the track has hosted a Las Vegas branch of the FoodieLand Night Market, a food festival.

Since 2012, Enrico Bertaggia, a former Italian Formula Three driver, has run the Dream Racing program at the track, a program where the general public can drive exotic cars around a road course on the track's complex. The track also hosts the "Driver's Edge" program, a driving education course.

In 2020, the track would play host to Roborace Season Beta where the outer road course was utilized.

== Lap records ==
As of October 2024, the fastest official race lap records at Las Vegas Motor Speedway are listed as:

Category	Time	Driver	Vehicle	Event
Tri-Oval Superspeedway (1996–present): 1.500 mi (2.414 km)
IndyCar	0:24.636	Richie Hearn	Reynard 95I	1996 Las Vegas 500K
Indy Lights	0:28.3227	Stefan Wilson	Dallara IPS	2011 Las Vegas 100
NASCAR Cup	0:28.808	Kevin Harvick	Ford Fusion	2018 Pennzoil 400
NASCAR Truck	0:30.043	Zane Smith	Ford F-150	2023 Victoria's Voice Foundation 200
NASCAR O'Reilly	0:30.063	A. J. Allmendinger	Chevrolet Camaro SS	2024 Ambetter Health 302
Long Road Course (1996–present): 2.499 mi (4.022 km)
GT3	1:32.873	Miguel Molina	Ferrari 488 GT3	2019 Las Vegas GT World Challenge America round
GT4	1:41.876	Mike Cooper	McLaren 570S GT4	2019 Las Vegas GT4 America round
TCR Touring Car	1:42.470	Mason Filippi	Hyundai Veloster N TCR	2019 Las Vegas TC America round
TC Touring Car	1:46.319	Jeff Ricca	Hyundai Genesis Coupe	2019 Las Vegas TC America round
TCA Touring Car	1:52.838	Bryan Ortiz	Mazda MX-5 (ND)	2019 Las Vegas TC America round
Medium Road Course (1996–present): 2.150 mi (3.460 km)
LMP900	1:08.273	Allan McNish	Audi R8	2000 Grand Prix of Las Vegas
GT1 (Prototype)	1:11.223	David Brabham	Panoz GTR-1	1998 Nevada Grand Prix
GT1 (GTS)	1:15.240	Olivier Beretta	Dodge Viper GTS-R	2000 Grand Prix of Las Vegas
GT2 (GTS)	1:15.394	Karl Wendlinger	Dodge Viper GTS-R	1999 Grand Prix of Las Vegas
GT	1:18.490	Dirk Müller	Porsche 911 (996) GT3-R	2000 Grand Prix of Las Vegas
Short Road Course (1996–present): 1.938 mi (3.119 km)
WSC	1:06.019	Butch Leitzinger	Riley & Scott Mk III	1997 Las Vegas 2 Hours
GT1 (GTS-1)	1:08.891	Allan McNish	Porsche 911 GT1	1997 Las Vegas 1 Hour 45 Minutes
GT2 (GTS-2)	1:13.039	Nick Ham	Porsche 911 GT2	1997 Las Vegas 1 Hour 45 Minutes
GT3 (GTS-3)	1:15.131	David Murry	Porsche 911 (993)	1997 Las Vegas 1 Hour 45 Minutes
