= Chevron B71 =

Chevron B71 Kopf Keiler KII
- Category: IMSA WSC
- Constructor: Chevron

Technical specifications
- Chassis: Steel tube frame/carbon fiber composite hybrid monocoque, carbon fiber body
- Suspension (front): Upper and lower A-arms, lower toe links, coil springs, tube shocks, anti-roll bar
- Suspension (rear): Upper and lower A-arms, pushrods, coilsprings, tube shocks, anti-roll bar
- Engine: Ford Windsor 5.0 L (305 cu in) 90° V8 N/A mid-engined, longitudinally mounted
- Transmission: Dyson 5-speed manual
- Weight: ~ 1,000 kg (2,205 lb)
- Tyres: Goodyear

Competition history
- Notable entrants: Kopf Precision Race Products Team
- Debut: 1995 12 Hours of Sebring
- Last event: 1999 12 Hours of Sebring
Races	Wins	Poles	F/Laps
13	0	0	0

The Chevron B71 was a sports prototype race car, designed, developed and built by Chevron, for IMSA's World Sports Car (WSC) class, in 1995. A modified development of this car, called the Kopf Keiler KII, closely based on the Chevron B71, debuted at the 1997 24 Hours of Daytona.

== Competition History ==
=== Chevron B71 ===
After its first official test in 1995 at Daytona International Speedway, the car was entered into the 24 Hours of Daytona but, did not appear in any session. Entered by Chevron Motorsport, the 1995 12 Hours of Sebring was the first and only race it completed classifying 16th in WSC and 61st overall with electrical issues. It was entered in the following race at the 1995 Grand Prix of Atlanta but did not participate in any sessions.

=== Kopf Keiler KII ===
The car reappeared in 1997, entered by Kopf Precision Race Products Team in six races in 1997 IMSA GT Championship. It had its highest finish of 9th overall at the 1997 Monterey Sports Car Championships. Over the next two years, it was entered in six races with a best finish of 5th in class, 17th overall at the 1998 Nevada Grand Prix.
