= Butch Leitzinger =

American racing driver

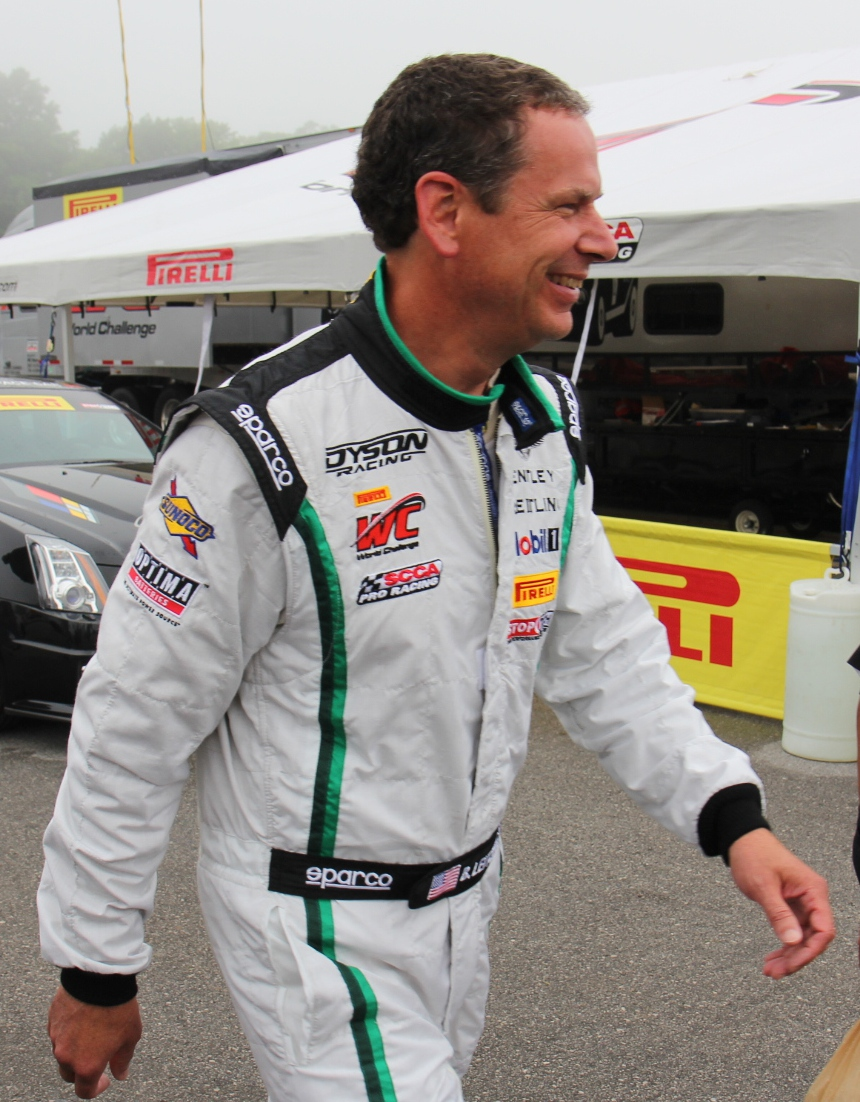
- Leitzinger at Road America in 2014
- Nationality: (United States) American
- Born: Robert Franklin Leitzinger; February 8, 1969 (age 57) Homestead, Pennsylvania, U.S.

Pirelli World Challenge career
- Debut season: 2014
- Current team: Dyson Racing
- Categorisation: FIA Platinum (until 2018); FIA Gold (2019–)
- Car number: 20
- Starts: 7
- Best finish: 11th in 2014
- Finished last season: 11th

Previous series
- 1999–2013 1998–2012 1994–1996, 2007 1994–1996, 2000, 2006 1993–1996: ALMS; Grand-Am; NASCAR Nextel Cup Series; NASCAR Busch Series; NASCAR Busch North Series

Championship titles
- 1999: Rolex Sports Car Series

24 Hours of Le Mans career
- Years: 1997, 1999–2003
- Teams: David Price Racing; Panoz Motorsports; Team Bentley; Risi Competizione
- Best finish: 3rd (2001
- Class wins: 2 (2001, 2002)

NASCAR Cup Series career
- 4 races run over 4 years
- Best finish: 54th (1995)
- First race: 1994 The Bud at The Glen (Watkins Glen)
- Last race: 2007 Toyota/Save Mart 350 (Infineon)
Wins	Top tens	Poles
0	0	0

NASCAR O'Reilly Auto Parts Series career
- 5 races run over 5 years
- Best finish: 78th (1996)
- First race: 1996 Fay's 150 (Watkins Glen)
- Last race: 2006 Zippo 200 (Watkins Glen)
Wins	Top tens	Poles
0	1	0

Robert Franklin "Butch" Leitzinger (born February 28, 1969) is an American professional racing driver. He is best known as an ALMS driver with Dyson Racing, but he has also driven for a variety of other teams and race series. He won the IMSA Pro WSC Championship driver's titles in both 1997 and 1998 while driving for Dyson Racing. Leitzinger is also a three time winner of the Daytona 24 Hours race, having won in 1994, 1997 and 1999.

== Racing career ==
=== Sports car racing ===
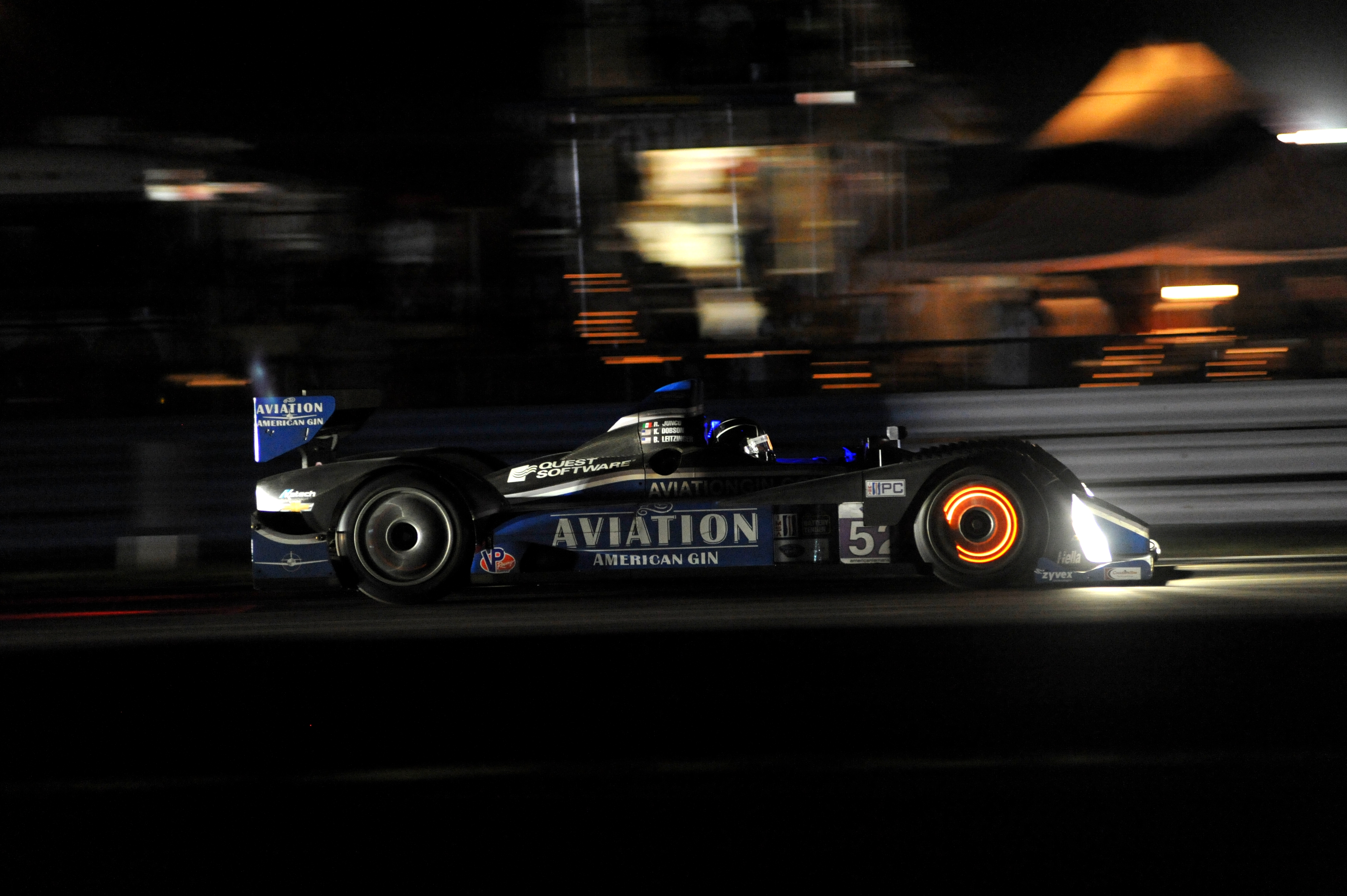
Leitzinger in the No. 52 PC at the 2012 12 Hours of Sebring.

Leitzinger has driven for the Bentley factory team at Le Mans in 2001 and 2002, for the Cadillac team at Le Mans in 2000 and for Panoz at Le Mans in 1999. Leitzinger has also driven in the GT classification for Risi Competizione at Le Mans in 2003. Leitzinger was also named 2002 Rookie of the Year in the Trans-Am Series. He drove the Alex Job Racing (AJR) No. 81 Porsche GT3 car in the first four events in the American Le Mans Series GTC class for the 2010 season, with Juan Gonzales earning victories at the 2010 12 Hours of Sebring as well as at Long Beach and a podium finish at Laguna Seca, resulting in the duo achieving a healthy lead in the points standings before unfortunate circumstances forced Alex Job Racing to downsize to a single-car effort with the No. 23 car for the remainder of the season.

Leitzinger spent the 2011 season as a substitute driver when needed and as a third driver during endurance races. As a substitute, Leitzinger ran a total of two ALMS races, one of which was the Lime Rock race in which he and Bill Sweedler finished third in class in the AJR GTC Porsche. The other race was the Road America race in which he drove the PR1/Mathiasen Motorsports LMPC car with Rudy Junco and on his first time ever driving an LMPC car and the first time with the team Leitzinger qualified on pole in class and along with Junco, won the race in class. As a third driver in endurance races, Leitzinger drove along with Humaid Al Masaood and Steven Kane in the No. 20 Oryx Dyson Racing car at Laguna Seca and Road Atlanta. At Laguna Seca, the No. 20 car led much of the race and finished in third. In the Petit Le Mans at Road Atlanta the car was sidelined early with a throttle position sensor problem. Shortly after returning to the track something in the left rear of the car broke as Leitzinger rounded turn 1 at about 150 mph (240 km/h) which sent him off the track and hard into the tires ending the day for the 20 car.

It was later announced that Leitzinger would drive the full 2012 season in the ALMS in the PR1/Mathiasen Motorsports LMPC car. The 2012 season would reunite the successful combination from Road America 2011 of PR1/Mathiasen Motorsports, Leitzinger, and Junco, who were co-drivers for the majority of the 2012 season.

Leitzinger shared the 1999 United States Road Racing Championship (USRRC) championship with teammate Elliott Forbes-Robinson and won the famed Rolex 24 at Daytona: twice with Dyson Racing (1997 & 1999), and once in a Nissan 300ZX (1994) co-driven with Scott Pruett, Steve Millen and Paul Gentilozzi.

At the beginning of their involvement in ALMS, Leitzinger and the Dyson team fielded Ford-powered Riley & Scott cars but switched to the newer MG-Lola EX257 midway through the 2002 season. Dyson Racing achieved its first ALMS victory in the car when Leitzinger and James Weaver scored an overall win at Infineon Raceway in Sonoma, California. This also marked the first time that an LMP675 (now called LMP2) class car scored an overall win in an ALMS race.

=== NASCAR ===
Leitzinger competed in NASCAR races as a road course ringer. He ran in three Winston Cup Series races at Watkins Glen with a best finish of twelfth in 1995. On June 24, 2007, Leitzinger ran the NASCAR Nextel Cup race at Infineon Raceway in the Bill Davis Racing-owned No. 23 Caterpillar Toyota and finished 28th. Leitzinger's nearest-miss in NASCAR racing was the Busch Series race at Watkins Glen in 2000 when he drove the No. 30 car for Innovative Motorsports; he led thirteen laps, and finished second behind fellow ringer Ron Fellows.

== Personal life ==
Leitzinger lives in State College, Pennsylvania with his wife, Kirsten, and their daughter and son. He earned a Bachelor of Science in business management from Penn State University in 1991. He is the son of IMSA driver, Bob Leitzinger, and artist Sandra Leitzinger.

== Motorsports career results ==
=== 24 Hours of Le Mans ===
Year	Team	Co-Drivers	Car	Class	Laps	Pos.	Class Pos.
1997	(United Kingdom) David Price Racing	(United Kingdom) Andy Wallace (United Kingdom) James Weaver	Panoz Esperante GTR-1	GT1	236	DNF	DNF
1999	(United States) Panoz Motorsports	(Australia) David Brabham (France) Éric Bernard	Panoz LMP-1 Roadster-S-Élan	LMP	336	7th	6th
2000	(United States) Team Cadillac	(France) Franck Lagorce (United Kingdom) Andy Wallace	Cadillac Northstar LMP	LMP900	291	21st	11th
2001	(United Kingdom) Team Bentley	(United Kingdom) Andy Wallace (Belgium) Eric van de Poele	Bentley EXP Speed 8	LMGTP	306	**3rd**	**1st**
2002	(United Kingdom) Team Bentley	(United Kingdom) Andy Wallace (Belgium) Eric van de Poele	Bentley EXP Speed 8	LMGTP	362	4th	**1st**
2003	(United States) Risi Competizione	(United States) Shane Lewis (United Kingdom) Johnny Mowlem	Ferrari 360 Modena GT	GT	138	DNF	DNF

=== NASCAR ===
(key) (Bold – Pole position awarded by qualifying time. Italics – Pole position earned by points standings or practice time. * – Most laps led.)

==== Nextel Cup Series ====
NASCAR Nextel Cup Series results
Year	Team	No.	Make	1	2	3	4	5	6	7	8	9	10	11	12	13	14	15	16	17	18	19	20	21	22	23	24	25	26	27	28	29	30	31	32	33	34	35	36	NNCC	Pts	Ref
1994	Butch Leitzinger Racing	03	Chevy	DAY	CAR	RCH	ATL	DAR	BRI	NWS	MAR	TAL	SON	CLT	DOV	POC	MCH	DAY	NHA	POC	TAL	IND	GLN; 31	MCH	BRI	DAR	RCH	DOV	MAR	NWS	CLT	CAR	PHO	ATL						72nd	70	
1995	Dick Brooks Racing	40	Pontiac	DAY	CAR	RCH	ATL	DAR	BRI	NWS	MAR	TAL	SON	CLT	DOV	POC	MCH	DAY	NHA	POC	TAL	IND	GLN; 12	MCH	BRI	DAR	RCH	DOV	MAR	NWS	CLT	CAR	PHO	ATL						54th	127	
1996	Diamond Ridge Motorsports	29	Chevy	DAY	CAR	RCH	ATL	DAR	BRI	NWS	MAR	TAL	SON	CLT	DOV	POC	MCH	DAY	NHA	POC	TAL	IND	GLN; 20	MCH	BRI	DAR	RCH	DOV	MAR	NWS	CLT	CAR	PHO	ATL						58th	103	
2007	Bill Davis Racing	23	Toyota	DAY	CAL	LVS	ATL	BRI	MAR	TEX	PHO	TAL	RCH	DAR	CLT	DOV	POC	MCH	SON; 28	NHA	DAY	CHI	IND	POC	GLN	MCH	BRI	CAL	RCH	NHA	DOV	KAN	TAL	CLT	MAR	ATL	TEX	PHO	HOM	66th	79	

==== Busch Series ====
NASCAR Busch Series results
Year	Team	No.	Make	1	2	3	4	5	6	7	8	9	10	11	12	13	14	15	16	17	18	19	20	21	22	23	24	25	26	27	28	29	30	31	32	33	34	35	NBSC	Pts	Ref
1994	Butch Leitzinger Racing	91	Ford	DAY	CAR	RCH	ATL	MAR	DAR	HCY	BRI	ROU	NHA	NZH	CLT	DOV	MYB	GLN; 27	MLW	SBO	TAL	HCY	IRP	MCH	BRI	DAR	RCH	DOV	CLT	MAR	CAR								113th	0^{1}	
1995	American Equipment Racing	95	Chevy	DAY	CAR	RCH	ATL	NSV	DAR	BRI	HCY	NHA	NZH	CLT	DOV	MYB	GLN; 16	MLW	TAL	SBO	IRP	MCH	BRI	DAR	RCH	DOV	CLT	CAR	HOM										86th	115	
1996	Butch Leitzinger Racing	91	Ford	DAY	CAR	RCH	ATL	NSV	DAR	BRI	HCY	NZH	CLT	DOV	SBO	MYB	GLN; 15	MLW	NHA	TAL	IRP	MCH	BRI	DAR	RCH	DOV	CLT	CAR	HOM										78th	118	
2000	Innovative Motorsports	30	Chevy	DAY	CAR	LVS	ATL	DAR	BRI	TEX	NSV	TAL	CAL	RCH	NHA	CLT	DOV	SBO	MYB	GLN; 2	MLW	NZH	PPR	GTY	IRP	MCH	BRI	DAR	RCH	DOV	CLT	CAR	MEM	PHO	HOM				87th	175	
2006	NDS Motorsports	79	Dodge	DAY	CAL	MXC	LVS	ATL	BRI	TEX	NSH	PHO	TAL	RCH	DAR	CLT	DOV	NSH	KEN	MLW	DAY	CHI	NHA	MAR	GTY	IRP	GLN; 21	MCH	BRI	CAL	RCH	DOV	KAN	CLT	MEM	TEX	PHO	HOM	116th	91	

^{1} Leitzinger's team was a post-entry for the race and thus did not receive points.

==== Busch North Series ====
NASCAR Busch North Series results
Year	Team	No.	Make	1	2	3	4	5	6	7	8	9	10	11	12	13	14	15	16	17	18	19	20	21	22	NBNSC	Pts	Ref
1993	Butch Leitzinger Racing	91	Ford	LEE	NHA	MND	NZH	HOL	GLN	JEN	STA	GLN	NHA	WIS	NHA	NHA	RPS	TMP	WMM	LEE	EPP	LRP; DNS				N/A	0	
1994	Butch Leitzinger Racing	91	Ford	NHA	NHA	MND	NZH	SPE	HOL	**GLN**; 1*	JEN	EPP	GLN; 27	NHA	WIS	STA	TMP	MND	WMM	RPS	LEE	NHA	LRP; 1*			39th	442	
1995	Butch Leitzinger Racing	91	Ford	DAY	NHA	LEE	JEN; 15	NHA	NZH	HOL	BEE	TMP	GLN	NHA	TIO	MND	GLN; 38	EPP	RPS	LEE	STA	BEE	NHA; 27	TMP	LRP; 1	38th	587	
1996	Butch Leitzinger Racing	91	Ford	DAY	LEE	JEN	NZH	HOL	NHA	TIO	BEE	TMP	NZH	NHA	STA	GLN	EPP	RPS	LEE	NHA	NHA	BEE	TMP	LRP; 1		69th	184	
