= Grand Prix of Las Vegas =

The Grand Prix of Las Vegas was a sports car race held at the Las Vegas Motor Speedway near Las Vegas, Nevada. It began as an IMSA GT Championship event in 1997, and became an American Le Mans Series event in 1999. It has not been held since 2000.

== Results ==
Year	Overall winner(s)	Entrant	Car	Distance/Duration	Race title	Report	Ref
IMSA GT Championship
1997	(United States) John Paul Jr. (United States) Butch Leitzinger	(United States) Dyson Racing	Riley & Scott Mk III-Ford	2 hours	Sportscar Grand Prix presented by FAO Schwarz	report	
1998	(South Africa) Wayne Taylor (Belgium) Eric van de Poele	(United States) Doyle-Risi Racing	Ferrari 333 SP	3 hours, 45 minutes	Toshiba Copiers and Fax Nevada Grand Prix	report	
American Le Mans Series
1999	(Finland) JJ Lehto (United Kingdom) Steve Soper	(Germany) BMW Motorsport	BMW V12 LMR	2 hours, 45 minutes	Grand Prix of Las Vegas	report	
2000	(Germany) Frank Biela (Italy) Emanuele Pirro	(Germany) Audi Sport North America	Audi R8	2 hours, 45 minutes	Grand Prix of Las Vegas presented by enjoythedrive.com	report	
