= 1971 SCCA Formula Super Vee season =

Seasons
- ← none 1972 →

The 1971 SCCA Formula Super Vee season was the first season of the Sports Car Club of America sanctioned Formula Super Vee championship.

== Race calendar and results ==
Round	Circuit	Location	Date	Pole position	Fastest lap	Winner
1	Daytona International Raceway	(United States) Daytona Beach, Florida	3 July	(United States) Bill Scott		(United States) Bill Scott
2	Road Atlanta	(United States) Braselton, Georgia	11 July			(United States) Tom Reddy
3	Talladega Superspeedway	(United States) Talladega, Alabama	21 August	(United States) Bill Scott		(United States) Tom Davey
4	Road America	(United States) Elkhart Lake, Wisconsin	29 August			(United States) Bill Scott
5	Lime Rock Park	(United States) Lakeville, Connecticut	6 September			(United States) Bill Scott
6	Riverside International Raceway	(United States) Riverside, California	3 October			(United States) Elliott Forbes-Robinson
7	Laguna Seca Raceway	(United States) Monterey, California	17 October			(United States) Bill Scott

== Final standings ==
Pos.	Driver	Chassis	(United States) DAY	(United States) ATL	(United States) TAL	(United States) ROA	(United States) LRP	(United States) RIV	(United States) LS	Points
1	(United States) Bill Scott	Royale	1	DNF	11	1	1	6	1	37
2	(United States) Tom Reddy	Lola	5	1	2	2	DNF	5	2	31
3	(United States) Tom Davey	Lola	12	DSQ	1	DNF	4	3	7	16
4	(United States) Elliott Forbes-Robinson	Zeitler						1	4	12
5	(United States) John Finger	Zink			5		6	2	5	11
6	(United States) John Magee	Zeitler	DNF	2	DNF	3	7	DNF		10
7	(United States) Jim Purcell	Lynx	2	DNF	DNF		16	4		9
7	(United States) Harry Ingle	Zink			DNF	4	2	10	DNF	9
9	(United States) Jim Jenkins	Winkelmann	DNF	3		7	3	20	9	8
10	(United States) Steve Pieper	Lola		DNF	3	8	5	7	DNF	6
11	(United States) Ted Tidwell	Zink	3	11	7		10			4
11	(United States) Ray Heppenstall	Royale	4		10	6	9	DNF	8	4
11	(United States) Bob Williams	Hawke						DNF	3	4
14	(United States) Jim Aronson	Royale Racing	6	DNF	DNF	5	8	11		3
14	(United States) Earl Nicewarner	Nickle	16		4	DNF		9	11	3
14	(United States) Bill Baldwin	Royale	14	4			11			3
17	(United States) John O'Steen	Caldwell		5						2
18	(United States) Mike Walker	Royale			6	DNF				1
18	(United States) Galen Lyons	Royale			15	DNF		13	6	1
18	(United States) Frank Marrs	Lola		6						1
	(United States) Bill Boye	Autodynamics	19							
	(United States) Phil Campbell	Beach	8							
	(United States) Dick Cooney	Hawke	11							
	(United States) Bob DeMarco	Kaimann	12							
	(United States) Ron Demarco	Beach	9							
	(United States) Stu Eichelberg	Beach				19				
	(United States) John McCollister	Zink				12				
	(United States) Michael Reed	Royale	20							
	(United States) Ted Roman	Zeitler	17							
	(United States) Harvey Staab	Winkelmann				13				
	(United States) Kirk Stowers	Caldwell	7							
	(United States) Bill Tartak, Jr.	Lola	15							
	(United States) John Werne	Royale				14				
	(United States) Dave Yoder	Lola	10		DNS					
