= 1974 SCCA Formula Super Vee season =

Seasons
- ← 1973 1975 →

The 1974 SCCA Formula Super Vee season was the fourth season of the Sports Car Club of America sanctioned Formula Super Vee championship. This season marked the first season of the second generation of the Formula Super Vee. One of the innovations was the introduction of slick tyres. As of 1974 not all of the series races were sanctioned by the SCCA, seven rounds were sanctioned by the International Motor Sports Association.

== Race calendar and results ==
Round	Circuit	Location	Date	Pole position	Fastest lap	Winner	Sanctioning body
1	Road Atlanta	(United States) Braselton, Georgia	21 April	(United States) Elliott Forbes-Robinson		(United States) Tom Bagley	SCCA
2	Lime Rock Park	(United States) Lakeville, Connecticut	4 May	(United States) Elliott Forbes-Robinson		(United States) Elliott Forbes-Robinson	IMSA
3	Laguna Seca Raceway	(United States) Monterey, California	12 May	(United States) Elliott Forbes-Robinson		(United States) Elliott Forbes-Robinson	SCCA
4	Ontario Motor Speedway	(United States) Ontario, California	19 May	(United States) Hurley Haywood		(United States) Harry Ingle	SCCA
5	Mid-Ohio Sports Car Course	(United States) Lexington, Ohio	30 June	(United States) Tom Bagley		(United States) Tom Bagley	SCCA
6	Road Atlanta	(United States) Braselton, Georgia	7 July	(United States) Harry Ingle		(United States) Elliott Forbes-Robinson	IMSA
7	Watkins Glen International Raceway	(United States) Watkins Glen, New York	14 July	(United States) Bob Lazier		(United States) Bob Lazier	IMSA
8	Charlotte Motor Speedway	(United States) Concord, North Carolina	18 August	(United States) Bob Lazier		(United States) Elliott Forbes-Robinson	IMSA
9	Road America	(United States) Elkhart Lake, Wisconsin	25 August	(United States) Harry Ingle		(United States) Fred Phillips	IMSA
10	Lime Rock Park	(United States) Lakeville, Connecticut	2 September	(United States) Harry Ingle		(United States) Harry Ingle	SCCA
11	Mosport Park	(Canada) Bowmanville, Ontario	25 August	(United States) Harry Ingle		(United States) Elliott Forbes-Robinson	
12	Watkins Glen International Raceway	(United States) Watkins Glen, New York	6 October	(United States) Howdy Holmes		(United States) Elliott Forbes-Robinson	IMSA
13	Autódromo Hermanos Rodríguez	Mexico City, Mexico	20 October	(United States) Howdy Holmes		(United States) Elliott Forbes-Robinson	
14	Daytona International Raceway	(United States) Daytona Beach, Florida	1 December	(Sweden) Freddy Kottulinsky		(Sweden) Freddy Kottulinsky	SCCA

== Final standings ==
Color	Result
Gold	Winner
Silver	2nd place
Bronze	3rd place
Green	4th & 5th place
Light Blue	6th–10th place
Dark Blue	11th place or lower
Purple	Did not finish
Red	Did not qualify (DNQ)
Brown	Withdrawn (Wth)
Black	Disqualified (DSQ)
White	Did not start (DNS)
Blank	Did not participate (DNP)
Blank	Driver replacement (Rpl)
Blank	Injured (Inj)
Blank	No race held (NH)

Pos.	Driver	Chassis	(United States) ATL1	(United States) LRP1	(United States) LS	(United States) ONT	(United States) MOH	(United States) ATL2	(United States) WGI1	(United States) CMS	(United States) ROA	(United States) LRP2	(Canada) MOS	(United States) WGI2	(Mexico) MEX	(United States) DAY	Points
1	(United States) Elliott Forbes-Robinson	Lola T320	2	1	1	3		1	5	1	27		1	1	1	4	185
2	(United States) Harry Ingle	Zink Z11	12	5	4	2	2	2	3	12	19	1	9	2			112
3	(United States) Tom Bagley	Royale RP9	1	3	8		1	13	8	19	6	5	10	26	5	6	87
4	(United States) Fred Phillips	Elden M10	9				10	15	4		1	3	2	25	4	2	85
5	(United States) Howdy Holmes	Lola T322	38	7	5	27	3	6	10			26	3	3	3	3	79
6	(Jamaica) Richard Melville	Royale RP18	10		27	25	4	37	2	2	2		19	7		18	60
7	(Sweden) Freddy Kottulinsky	Lola T322	4	2							3					1	57
8	(Sweden) Bror Jaktlund	Supernova Tui	35	6	7	4	11	25	33	5		10	4	5			47
9	(United States) Hurley Haywood	Tui BH3	39	11	2	1	5	28	28								43
10	(United States) Bob Lazier	Lola	11				26	4	1	3	16						42
11	(United States) Walter Wilkins	Royale RP18	24	22	16	10	21	3	9	4	7	27		11	9	24	31
12	(United States) Allan Turner	Lola T320	5	8	3	26	20	7			8						30
13	(United States) Ed Wachs	Lola T320					6		6		5	6		12			26
14	(United States) Peter Moody	Tui	14	4	13		33	36	7	6	24	11					20
15	(United States) Bill Robinson	Lola T320	17		11	7	13	10	12			9	8		8	7	19
16	(Mexico) Freddy Van Beuren IV	Tui BH3										7			2		19
17	(Canada) Craig Hill	Supernova Tui											5	4			18
18	(United States) Bill Scott	Royale					9					2					17
19	(United States) Tom Reddy	Tui BH3	3			8		9									17
20	(Jamaica) Peter Moodie	Royale			12		8						6		6	20	15
21	(United States) William Neuhoff	Royale	19		18	11		11	20	17	4				7		14
22	(United States) Bill Alsup	Tui	16	17	19		12			7		13	7	9		8	13
23	(United States) Chris Gleason	Tui	7		14	5			19	10							13
24	(United States) Rick Bell	Royale RP18	18	12						11		4					10
25	(United States) John Finger	Lola						5		9							10
26	(United Kingdom) John Morrison	Tui														5	8
27	(United States) Frank Maka	Lola T320		10	6												7
28	(United States) Dick Renard	Lola				6											6
29	(Sweden) Bertil Roos	Supernova Tui												6			6
30	(United States) Turner Woodard	Supernova Tui	6														6
31	(United States) Benny Scott	Lola				16			11	15	10	8				14	4
32	(United States) Marcel Jordain	Supernova Tui					7	12									4
33	(United States) Randy Lewis	Lola			9	9											4
34	(United States) John Hancock	Lola T252					16	8							10		4
35	(United States) Reeves Callaway	Lola T250	13				17		16			22		8			3
36	(United States) Al Holbert	Royale RP18A								8							3
37	(United States) Frank Marrs	Lola	8														3
38	(United States) Fred Markoff	Lola T320	15				15				9						2
39	(United States) Jim Crawley	Tui														9	2
40	(United States) Tom Evans	LeGrand			10						13	17					1
41	(United States) Ed Mulford	Tui												10			1
42	(United States) Dick Mathias	Royale														10	1
