= SCCA Formula Super Vee =

- Category: Formula Super Vee
- Country: United States of America; Canada; Mexico
- Inaugural season: 1971
- Folded: 1990
- Constructors: Various
- Engine suppliers: Volkswagen
- Last Drivers' champion: (United States) Stuart Crow
- Last Makes' champion: Ralt

The SCCA Formula Super Vee was one of the longest running Formula Super Vee championships in the world. Twenty racing season were contested. Most of the races were sanctioned by the Sports Car Club of America in some occasions the races were sanctioned by the International Motor Sports Association.

== History ==
In 1969 Josef Hoppen, head of the motorsport department of Volkswagen of America, approached the Sports Car Club of America. The Formula Super Vee was announced as an SCCA national class in November 1969. The class was created as a substitute for the overpopulated Formula Vee class. Beach Racing Cars manufactured the first Super Vee car, a single seater using threaded tires and no aerodynamic aides. Settled Formula Vee constructors Zink Cars, Autodynamics and Zeitler Racing Design soon followed. Beach's first Formula Super Vee chassis was bought by Formula Super Vee Europe to promote the racing class in Europe.

Thirteen drivers competed in the first edition of the Formula Super Vee SCCA National Championship Runoffs at Road Atlanta. Driver/constructor John Zeitler qualified on pole but dropped to fifth position. Tom Davey won the prestigious race also racing a Zeitler chassis. In the combined Formula Super Vee/Formula Ford race, Super Vee's finished in the first three places. Skip Barber was the first Formula Ford driver placing fourth overall. The first national series was held in 1971. Bill Scott won the inaugural race at Daytona International Raceway. Scott went on to win races at Road America, Lime Rock Park and Laguna Seca Raceway. The 1972 season entries improved and slick tires were introduced to the series. Scott became the first double champion of the series despite only winning two races. For 1973 international drivers stepped in with Swede Bertil Roos winning three out of the first four races. A late charge from Elliott Forbes-Robinson could not prevent Roos winning the championship.

In 1974 a new Formula Super Vee era began. The series featured fourteen races, two of them outside the United States. Races abroad were run at Mosport Park, Canada and Autódromo Hermanos Rodríguez, Mexico. Series organizer, Josef Hopen, was not loyal to any specific sanctioning body. Half of the races, including the races abroad, were sanctioned by the International Motor Sports Association. . The co-sanctioning continued for 1975 but ended before the 1976 season. Political disagreement resulted in Hoppen pulling the Formula Super Vee Robert Bosch championship out of IMSA. As a response IMSA created the Formula Atlantic class and USAC created the Mini-Indy Series Formula Super Vee.

The next era for Formula Super Vee started in 1978. The class introduced a new, water cooled, Volkswagen Rabbit engine replacing the old air cooled one. The SCCA club racing scene remained using the old engine. The SCCA dropped the class from its regional and national series, merging it into Formula Continental, but the professional series remained. Bill Alsup won the first season of the new era Formula Super Vee championship. Ralt dominated almost every season fielding the most cars out of any constructor. Only the 1983 and 1986 championships were won by other manufacturers.

== Champions ==
SCCA Formula Super Vee			SCCA National Championship Runoffs		
Season	Champion Driver	Chassis	Season	Champion Driver	Chassis
1970	Not contested		1970	(United States) Tom Davey	Zeitler
1971	(United States) Bill Scott	Royale RP9	1971	(United States) Tom Davey	Lola
1972	(United States) Bill Scott	Royale RP14	1972	(United States) Bob Wheelock	Lola
1973	(Sweden) Bertil Roos	Tui BH3	1973	(United States) Harry Ingle	Zink
1974	(United States) Elliott Forbes-Robinson	Lola T320	1974	(United States) Fred Phillips	Elden Mk14
1975	(United States) Eddie Miller	Lola T324	1975	(United States) Fred Phillips	Elden Mk14B
1976	(United States) Tom Bagley	Zink Z11	1976	(United States) Herm Johnson	Lola T324
1977	(United States) Bob Lazier	Lola T324	1977	(United States) Steve Ovel	Lola T324
1978	(United States) Bill Alsup	Argo JM2	1978	(United States) Mike Yoder	Lola
1979	(Australia) Geoff Brabham	Ralt RT1	1979	Not contested	
1980	(United States) Peter Kuhn	Ralt RT1/RT5	1980	Not contested	
1981	(United States) Al Unser Jr.	Ralt RT5	1981	Not contested	
1982	(United States) Michael Andretti	Ralt RT5	1982	Not contested	
1983	(United States) Ed Pimm	Anson SA4	1983	Not contested	
1984	(Netherlands) Arie Luyendyk	Ralt RT5	1984	Not contested	
1985	(United States) Ken Johnson	Ralt RT5	1985	Not contested	
1986	(Belgium) Didier Theys	Martini MK-47/MK-50	1986	Not contested	
1987	(United States) Scott Atchison	Ralt RT5	1987	Not contested	
1988	(United States) Ken Murillo	Ralt RT5	1988	Not contested	
1989	(United States) Mark Smith	Ralt RT5	1989	Not contested	
1990	(United States) Stuart Crow	Ralt RT5	1990	Not contested	
