= 1973 SCCA Formula Super Vee season =

Seasons
- ← 1972 1974 →

The 1973 SCCA Formula Super Vee season was the third season of the Sports Car Club of America sanctioned Formula Super Vee championship.

== Race calendar and results ==
Round	Circuit	Location	Date	Pole position	Fastest lap	Winner
1	Lime Rock Park	(United States) Lime Rock, Connecticut	5 May			(Sweden) Bertil Roos
2	Watkins Glen International Raceway	(United States) Watkins Glen, New York	16 May	(United States) Don Bradley		(Sweden) Bertil Roos
3	Road Atlanta	(United States) Braselton, Georgia	8 July	(United States) Harry Ingle		(United States) Harry Ingle
4	Watkins Glen International Raceway	(United States) Watkins Glen, New York	22 July	(Sweden) Bertil Roos		(Sweden) Bertil Roos
5	Road Atlanta	(United States) Braselton, Georgia	26 August	(United States) Fred Phillips		(United States) Bob Wheelock
6	Pocono Raceway	(United States) Long Pond, Pennsylvania	3 September	(United States) Tom Reddy		(United States) Bob Lazier
7	Seattle International Raceways	(United States) Lake Morton-Berrydale, Washington	30 September	(United States) Elliott Forbes-Robinson		(United States) Elliott Forbes-Robinson
8	Laguna Seca Raceway	(United States) Monterey, California	14 October	(United States) Elliott Forbes-Robinson		(United States) Elliott Forbes-Robinson
9	Riverside Raceway	(United States) Riverside, California	28 October	(United States) Bob Lazier		(United States) Bob Lazier

== Final standings ==
Color	Result
Gold	Winner
Silver	2nd place
Bronze	3rd place
Green	4th & 5th place
Light Blue	6th–10th place
Dark Blue	11th place or lower
Purple	Did not finish
Red	Did not qualify (DNQ)
Brown	Withdrawn (Wth)
Black	Disqualified (DSQ)
White	Did not start (DNS)
Blank	Did not participate (DNP)
Blank	Driver replacement (Rpl)
Blank	Injured (Inj)
Blank	No race held (NH)

Pos.	Driver	Chassis	(United States) LRP	(United States) WGI1	(United States) ATL1	(United States) WGI2	(United States) ATL2	(United States) POC	(United States) SEA	(United States) LS	(United States) RIV	Points
1	(Sweden) Bertil Roos	Tui BH3	1	1	34	1	29	5		6	3	86
2	(United States) Harry Ingle	Royale RP14			1	23	5	2	2	5	4	76
3	(United States) Bob Lazier	Royale RP18			29	30	3	1	21	2	1	67
4	(United States) Elliott Forbes-Robinson	Lola T252							1	1	2	55
5	(United States) Wink Bancroft	Lola T320		23	2	2	9	7	8	27	11	39
6	(United States) Frank Maka	Lola T320		27	28	4	2	3		11	25	37
7	(United States) Bob Williams	Lola T320		11	3	25	8	10		3	6	34
8	(United States) Tom Bagley	Lola T252	3	3	5	36		DSQ				32
9	(United States) Fred Phillips	Tui BH3	13	33	31	3	4	23			5	30
10	(United States) Bob Wheelock	Lola T252	20	9	8	26	1	22				25
11	(United States) Howdy Holmes	Lola T252	10	15	32	6	6		3		23	25
12	(New Zealand) Dave McMillan	Tui BH3		4	30	5	17	6	17	36		24
13	(Mexico) Fred van Beuren IV	Tui BH3				9	7	4	18	8	7	23
14	(United States) Richard Melville	Royale RP18		6	4	8	31	17	22	28	38	19
15	(United States) Stephen Webb	Lola T252	2	12	16	24	15	19				15
16	(United States) Tom Reddy	Tui BH3		2			20	25	24	32		15
17	(United States) Dick Cooney	Tui BH3	5		12	22			6	25		14
18	(United States) Bert Everett	Tui BH3								4	8	13
19	(United States) Jack Rabold	Tui BH3	4	30	17	14		14				10
20	(United States) Dick Renard	Lola T252							4	12	13	10
21	(United States) Tom Pumpelly	Royale RP14		5								8
22	(United States) Mike Eyerly	Tui BH3							5			8
23	(United States) John Benton	Tui BH3	6	25	10	12	14	20		19		7
24	(United States) Allan Turner	Lola T320		13	6		25				12	6
25	(United States) Dave Yoder	Lola T252	14		9	7	30					6
26	(United States) Don Bradley	Royale RP18		8		10	21	9				6
27	(United States) Benny Scott	Lola T252		22			13	8		26	9	5
28	(United States) Frank Marrs	Lola T252	7	14	14							4
29	(United States) Bob McQueen	Lola T320		7								4
30	(United States) Shelly Marrs	Lola T320		16	7							4
31	(United States) Bill Collins	Tui BH3				13	12	12	7			4
32	(United States) Tom Wiechmann	Lola T320								7		4
33	(United States) Bob Danielson	Lola T252	8	17								3
34	(United States) Walter Handley	Lola T252	9									2
35	(United States) Tom Evans	LeGrand							9	13	16	2
36	(United States) Stephen Griswold	Tui AM29						11		9	19	2
37	(United States) John Morrison	Tui BH3								10	10	2
38	(United States) Ron Dykes	Royale RP14		10								1
39	(United States) Bob DeMarco	Lola T320			20	17	10					1
40	(United States) Bill Robinson	Royale RP9							10	14	17	1
