= 1972 SCCA Formula Super Vee season =

1972 Bosch / VW Formula Super Vee Championship season
- SCCA Formula Super Vee Championship

Season
- Races: 9
- Start date: February 1st
- End date: November 30th

Awards
- Drivers' champion: (United States) Bill Scott

The 1972 SCCA Formula Super Vee season was the second season of the Sports Car Club of America sanctioned Formula Super Vee championship.

== Race calendar and results ==
Round	Circuit	Location	Date	Pole position	Fastest lap	Winner
1	Sebring International Raceway	(United States) Sebring, Florida	24 March			(Sweden) Gregor Kronegard
2	Watkins Glen International Raceway	(United States) Watkins Glen, New York	18 June			(United States) Bill Scott
3	Road Atlanta	(United States) Braselton, Georgia	9 July			(United States) Harry Ingle
4	Donnybrooke Speedway	(United States) Brainerd, Minnesota	29 July			(United States) Steve Pieper
5	Road America	(United States) Elkhart Lake, Wisconsin	27 August			(United States) Bill Scott
6	Lime Rock Park	(United States) Lime Rock, Connecticut	3 October			(United States) Tom Reddy
7	Portland International Raceway	(United States) Portland, Oregon	17 September			(United States) Elliott Forbes-Robinson
8	Laguna Seca Raceway	(United States) Monterey, California	15 October			(United States) Jon Woodner
9	Riverside Raceway	(United States) Riverside, California	29 October			(United States) Elliott Forbes-Robinson

== Final standings ==
Color	Result
Gold	Winner
Silver	2nd place
Bronze	3rd place
Green	4th & 5th place
Light Blue	6th–10th place
Dark Blue	11th place or lower
Purple	Did not finish
Red	Did not qualify (DNQ)
Brown	Withdrawn (Wth)
Black	Disqualified (DSQ)
White	Did not start (DNS)
Blank	Did not participate (DNP)
Blank	Driver replacement (Rpl)
Blank	Injured (Inj)
Blank	No race held (NH)

Pos.	Driver	Chassis	(United States) SEB	(United States) WGI	(United States) ATL	(United States) BRA	(United States) ROA	(United States) LRP	(United States) POR	(United States) LS	(United States) RIV	Points
1	(United States) Bill Scott	Royale RP14	3	1	4	22	1	3	2	31	25	90
2	(United States) Harry Ingle	Zink Z-9	2	3	1	4	6	6	6	26	6	75
3	(Sweden) Gregor Kronegard	Lola T252	1		3		2	2				62
4	(United States) Elliott Forbes-Robinson	Lola T252		25	7		14	5	1	5	1	60
5	(United States) Bob Lazier	Zink				5	4	4	3	2	29	55
6	(United States) Tom Davey	Lola T252	26	27	8	2	5	26		4	2	51
7	(United States) Tom Reddy	Lola T252	24	8	23	3	27	1		3	10	48
8	(United States) Jon Woodner	Tui BH3			31		28	9	5	1	3	42
9	(United States) Steve Pieper	Royale RP9	16	7	24	1	7	7	8	7	8	42
10	(United States) Fred Phillips	Leda Tui		28	2	19	8	10	4	12	5	37
11	(United States) Galen Lyons	Royale	4	4	28	6	25	27	10			27
12	(United States) Bob Williams	Royale	18	2		20	33	12	16	6	26	21
13	(United States) Howdy Holmes	Lola T252		6	6	24	37	22		10	7	17
13	(Mexico) Fred van Beuren IV	Leda Tui		24	7	21	14	5		8	9	17
15	(United States) John Finger	Zink	19	5	5							16
16	(United States) John Morton	Hawke									4	10
17	(United States) John Hancock	Lola T250	5		12		23					8
17	(United States) Tom Bagley	Royale	7	26	16	7						8
19	(United States) Ron DeMarco	Royale	6		13	16	32					6
19	(United States) Frank Maka	Royale		22	30	9	12	11	7	25	19	6
21	(United States) Peter DeMeritt	Royale		10	26	8	34			28		4
22	(United States) Ted Roman	Zeitler	8	11	25							3
22	(United States) Earl Nicewarner	Nickle	11	10	9		15	13				3
22	(United States) Bob Wheelock	Lola				10	9					3
22	(United States) Gordon Smiley	Zeitler				18		8				3
26	(United States) Dave Yoder	Lola	9		17							2
26	(United States) Bill Campbell	Zink			9							2
26	(United States) Mike Eyerly	Leda Tui							9			2
26	(United States) Scooter Patrick	Leda Tui								9	16	2
30	(United States) Dick Jacobs	Lola	10		11		13					1
31	(United States) Peter Schuster	Leda Tui				11	10	23				1
