= Didier Theys =

Belgian racing driver (born 1956)

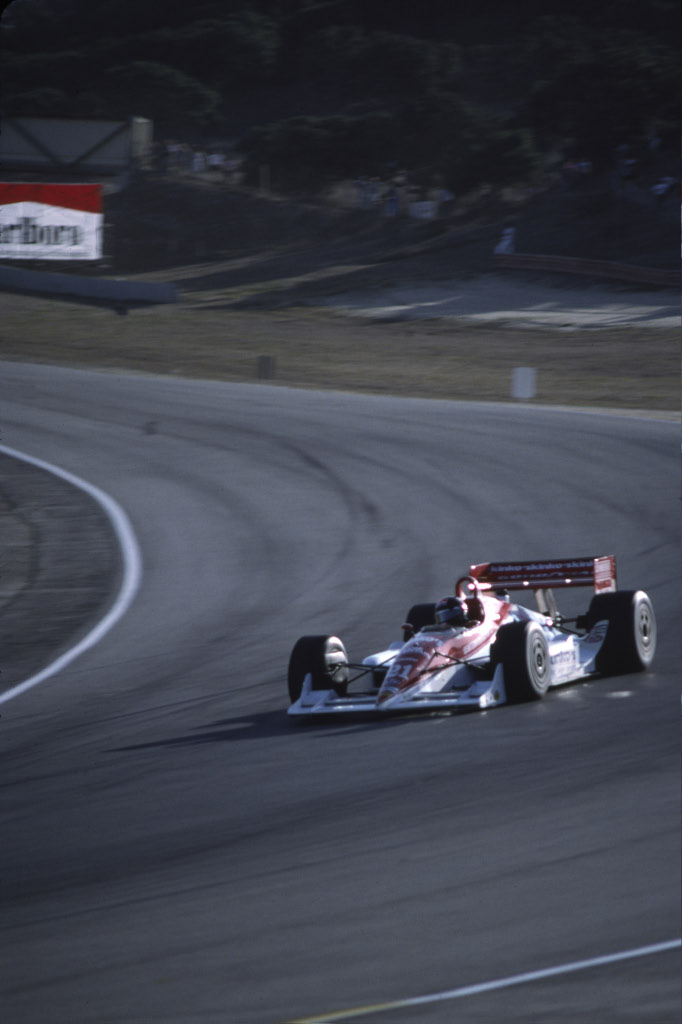
- Didier Theys in 1991
- Nationality: (Belgium) Belgian
- Born: Didier Maurice Theys; 19 October 1956 (age 70) Nivelles, Belgium

Didier Maurice Theys (born 19 October 1956) is a Belgian sports car driver. He is a two-time overall winner of the 24 Hours of Daytona (1998 and 2002); a winner of the 12 Hours of Sebring (1998); the Sports Racing Prototype driver champion of the Grand-American Road Racing Association (2002) and the winner of the 24 Hours of Spa (1987 in a factory BMW). He was also the polesitter (1996) and a podium finisher at the 24 Hours of Le Mans (1997, 1998 and 1999). The podium finish in 1999 was a third overall in the factory Audi R8R with co-drivers Emanuele Pirro and Frank Biela. Theys' first appearance at Le Mans was in 1982, while his last start in the world's most famous endurance sports car race came 20 years later in 2002.

== Formula racing ==
Theys won the Belgium Karting championship in 1977. Later he competed in several feeder formulae: he won several Formula Ford championships in the late 1970s and early 1980s; the U.S. Bosch Super Vee championship in 1986; and the American Racing Series (now Indy Lights) championship in 1987. He was also successful in the European Formula Three Championship and Formula 2 in the 1980s. He finished third in the Monaco Formula 3 Grand Prix in 1985.

Theys competed in the CART Indy Car Series from 1987 to 1993 with 47 career starts, including the Indianapolis 500 three times (1989, 1990 and 1993). He finished in the top-ten 10 times in CART events, and his best career finish in that series was a third position in Miami in 1988.

== IMSA ==
Theys ran the IMSA GT Championship in 1995 on a Ferrari 333SP. He finished fourth in 1996, 11th in 1997, and sixth in the series' final season in 1998.

== 1998 season ==
Theys' 1998 victories at Daytona and Sebring came in the Kevin Doran-prepared MOMO Ferrari with co-drivers Mauro Baldi, Arie Luyendyk and Giampiero Moretti. His 2002 Daytona victory came in the Doran Lista Dallara Judd with co-drivers Baldi, Fredy Lienhard and Max Papis.

Theys' 1998 season was a record-setter, as in addition to winning Daytona and Sebring, He also won the Six Hours of Watkins Glen.

Theys also finished second overall in the FIA Sportscar Championship that year, winning at Paul Ricard, France.

== 2000–2002 seasons ==
In addition to his Grand-Am driver championship in 2002, Theys finished third in the driver point standings in that series in 2001 and was the runner-up in 2000. He had four victories in his championship 2002 season, and established the largest margin of victory in series history in winning the race at Mont-Tremblant, Quebec from the pole that year.

== After 2002 ==
Prior to retiring from pro racing in March 2009, Theys also competed in the Le Mans Series in Europe with Horag Racing from 2005 through 2008, winning the Monza 1,000 km race in the LMP2 category in 2007 and a similar event at the Nürburgring in 2005 in a Lola Judd. He finished his pro driving career in the Horag Racing-prepared Lista Office Porsche RS Spyder in the Le Mans Series' LMP2 division in 2008, finishing second in class at Spa and Silverstone, third at Monza and winning the Michelin Energy Challenge that season.

Theys also drove a Maserati MC 12 for Doran Racing in the ALMS in 2007, an effort that stunned the GT1 class when it beat the factory Corvettes to win the pole at the Petit Le Mans that year.

== Accomplishments ==
Upon his retirement from driving professionally, Theys had finished on the podium 61 times in sports car races all over the world, with 18 victories, 22 second-place finishes and 21 third-place finishes through the end of the 2008 season. He has the most professional victories of anyone in a Ferrari 333 SP with ten.

Theys received the prestigious Driver of the Year Award in his native Belgium in 2002.

== Post-retirement ==
Theys currently works as a racing driver coach and consultant. He is also the Driving Director of DrivingXllence, an automotive event company that allows guests to experience being behind the wheel of the world's newest and best Supercars.

== Personal ==
Although he never gave up his Belgium citizenship, Theys resided in Scottsdale, Arizona for many years, and still lives there. That municipality honored him with the keys to the city in honor of his GRAND-AM driver championship and second 24 Hours of Daytona victory. He is married to Florence Richardson.

== Racing record ==
=== Complete 24 Hours of Le Mans results ===
Year	Team	Co-Drivers	Car	Class	Laps	Pos.	Class Pos.
1982	(France) WM Esso	(France) Jean-Daniel Raulet (France) Michel Pignard	WM P82-Peugeot	C	127	DNF	DNF
1983	(France) WM Secateva	(France) Jean-Daniel Raulet (France) Michel Pignard	WM P83-Peugeot	C	102	DNF	DNF
1985	(Switzerland) Brun Motorsport	(Switzerland) Walter Brun (France) Joël Gouhier	Porsche 962C	C1	304	DNF	DNF
1986	(Switzerland) Brun Motorsport	(Belgium) Thierry Boutsen (France) Alain Ferté	Porsche 956	C1	89	DNF	DNF
1988	(Germany) Blaupunkt Joest Racing	(United Kingdom) David Hobbs (Austria) Franz Konrad	Porsche 962C	C1	380	5th	5th
1993	(Belgium) Team Paduwa	(Germany) Harald Grohs (Belgium) Jean-Paul Libert	Porsche 911 Carrera 2 Cup	GT	8	DNF	DNF
1996	(Germany) Joest Racing	(Italy) Michele Alboreto (Italy) Pierluigi Martini	TWR Porsche WSC-95	LMP1	300	DNF	DNF
1997	(Italy) Moretti Racing Inc.	(Italy) Gianpiero Moretti (Italy) Max Papis	Ferrari 333 SP	LMP	321	6th	**3rd**
1998	(Italy) Moretti Racing Inc.	(Italy) Gianpiero Moretti (Italy) Mauro Baldi	Ferrari 333 SP	LMP	311	14th	**3rd**
1999	(Germany) Audi Sport Team Joest	(Germany) Frank Biela (Italy) Emanuele Pirro	Audi R8R	LMP	360	**3rd**	**2nd**
2000	(France) Mopar Team Oreca	(Belgium) Jeffrey van Hooydonk (France) Didier André	Reynard 2KQ-LM-Mopar	LMP900	292	20th	10th
2001	(United States) Champion Racing	(United Kingdom) Johnny Herbert (Germany) Ralf Kelleners	Audi R8	LMP900	81	DNF	DNF
2002	(United States) Riley & Scott Racing	(Belgium) Marc Goossens (United States) Jim Matthews	Riley & Scott Mk III C-Élan	LMP900	189	DNF	DNF

=== Complete 24 Hours of Spa results ===
Year	Team	Co-Drivers	Car	Class	Laps	Pos.	Class Pos.
1979	(Belgium) Kinley Luigi Racing	(Belgium) Patrick Nève (Germany) Hans-Joachim Stuck	BMW 530i	T +2.5		DNF	DNF
1980	(United Kingdom) TWR Mazda Motul Team	(United Kingdom) Jeff Allam (France) Benoit Béguin (United Kingdom) John Morrison	Mazda RX-7	T +2.5	358	21st	4th
1982	(Belgium) Belgian Audi VW Club	(Belgium) Michel Maillien (Belgium) Jean Wansart	VW Scirocco GTI	Div.1		DNF	DNF
1985	(Switzerland) Eggenberger Motorsport	(Belgium) Pierre Dieudonné (Italy) Carlo Rossi	Volvo 240 Turbo	Div.3	489	4th	4th
1986	(Sweden) RAS Sport	(Sweden) Thomas Lindström (Sweden) Ulf Granberg	Volvo 240 Turbo	Div.3	460	DNF	DNF
1987	(Belgium) Waterloo Motors	(Belgium) Jean-Michel Martin (Belgium) Eric van de Poele	BMW M3	Div.2	481	1st	1st
1988	(Switzerland) Ford Texaco Eggenberger Racing Team	(Italy) Gianfranco Brancatelli (Belgium) Bertrand Gachot	Ford Sierra RS 500 Cosworth	Div.3	506	DNF	DNF
1989	BMW Belgium	(Belgium) Marc Duez (United Kingdom) Steve Soper	BMW 635 CSi	Div.2	182	DNF	DNF
1993	(Belgium) Team Paduwa	(France) Paul Belmondo (Belgium) Jean-Paul Libert	Porsche 964 Carrera 2	PRO GT	279	16th	16th

=== American open–wheel racing results ===
(key)

==== Formula Super Vee ====
Year	Team	Chassis	Engine	1	2	3	4	5	6	7	8	9	10	11	12	13	Rank	Points
1986	Martini USA	Martini MK 47, MK 50	VW Bertils	LBH; 4	IRP; 1	MIL	**DET**; Ret	**MEA**; 1	**CLE**; 1	ROA1; 13	MOH; 8	ROA2; 2	LS; 2	PHX; Ret	**MIA**; 1	**STP**; 1	**1st**	**155**

==== PPG Indycar Series ====
(key) (Races in bold indicate pole position)

Year	Team	1	2	3	4	5	6	7	8	9	10	11	12	13	14	15	16	17	Rank	Points	Ref
1987	Newman Teamworks	LBH; 7	PHX	INDY	MIL	POR	MEA	CLE	TOR	MCH	POC	ROA; 22	MOH	NAZ	LAG				**30th**	**6**	
1987	Truesports Co.															MIA; 17			**30th**	**6**	
1988	Dick Simon Racing	PHX	LBH	INDY	MIL	POR; 10	CLE; 9	TOR; 18	MEA; 21	MCH	POC	MOH; 10	ROA; 23	NAZ	LAG; 8	MIA; 3			**15th**	**29**	
1989	Arciero Racing	PHX; 20	LBH; 23	INDY; 20	MIL; 17														**21st**	**9**	
1989	Hemelgarn Racing					DET; 9	POR; 20	CLE; 12	MEA; 26	TOR	MCH	POC							**21st**	**9**	
1989	Vince Granatelli Racing												MOH; 11	ROA; 11	NAZ; 21	LAG; 17			**21st**	**9**	
1990	Vince Granatelli Racing	PHX; 14	LBH; 11	INDY; 11	MIL	DET; 13	POR; 20	CLE; 23	MEA; 28	TOR; 7	MCH	DEN; 9	VAN; 25	MOH; 16	ROA	NAZ			**18th**	**15**	
1990	A. J. Foyt Enterprises																LAG; 12		**18th**	**15**	
1991	Leader Card Racing	SRF	LBH; 10	PHX	INDY; DNQ	MIL	DET; DNQ	POR; 22	CLE; 12	MEA; 20	TOR; 13	MCH	DEN; 23	VAN	MOH; 23	ROA; 25	NAZ	LAG; 14	**25th**	**4**	
1992	Hall/VDS Racing	SRF	PHX	LBH	INDY; DNQ	DET	POR	MIL	NHA	TOR	MCH	CLE	ROA	VAN	MOH	NAZ			**40th**	**0**	
1992	Chip Ganassi Racing																LAG; 13		**40th**	**0**	
1993	Hemelgarn Racing	SRF	PHX	LBH	INDY; 22	MIL	DET	POR	CLE	TOR	MCH	NHA	ROA	VAN	MOH	NAZ			**42nd**	**0**	
1993	Dick Simon Racing																LAG; 15		**42nd**	**0**	
1994	Project Indy	SRF	PHX	LBH	INDY; DNQ	MIL	DET	POR	CLE	TOR	MCH	MOH	NHA	VAN	ROA	NAZ	LAG		NC	–	

Sporting positions
Preceded by Ken Johnson	US Formula Super Vee; Champion; 1986	Succeeded by Scott Atchison
Preceded by Fabrizio Barbazza	ARS; Champion; 1987	Succeeded by Jon Beekhuis
