= Wiet Huidekoper =

Louis "Wiet" Huidekoper (Bussum, 29 October 1953 - Purmerend, 7 January 2023) was a Dutch racecar designer and former technical director for the Opel DTM programme. His major career was in the international sports car racing arena.

== Career ==
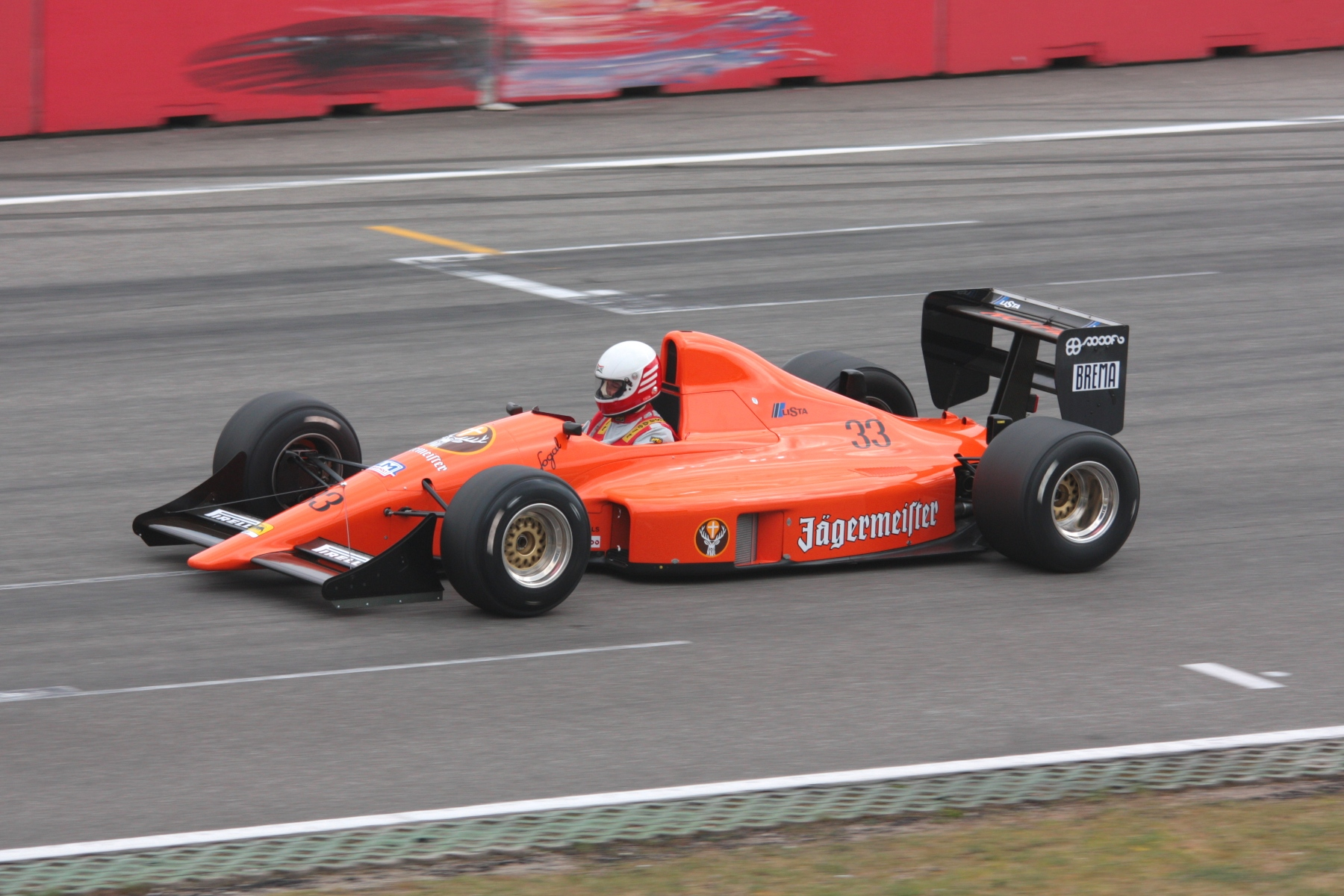
The EuroBrun ER189 featured sponsorship by Jägermeister

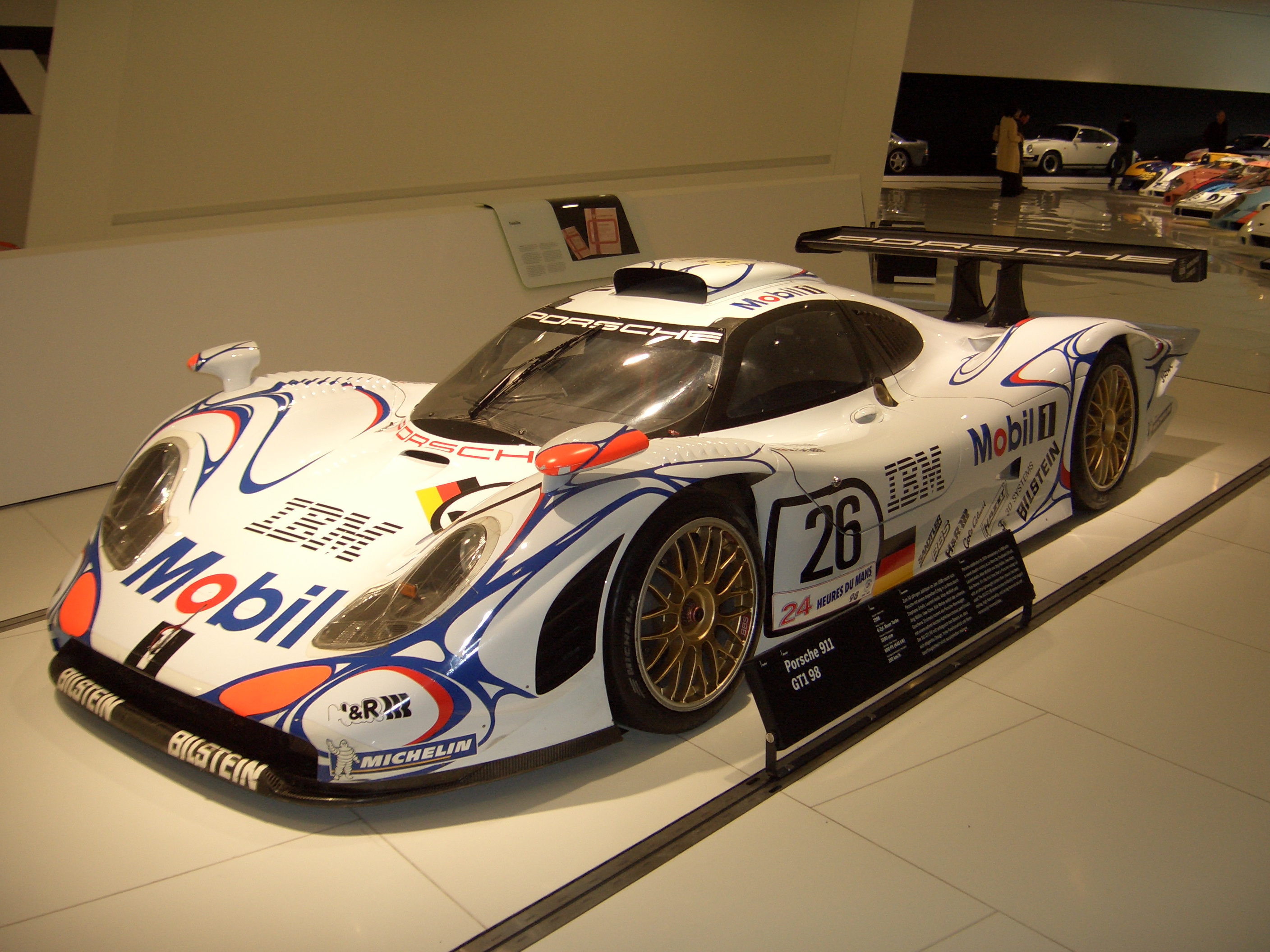
The overall winning #26 Porsche 911 GT1 '98 on display in the Porsche Museum, Stuttgart.

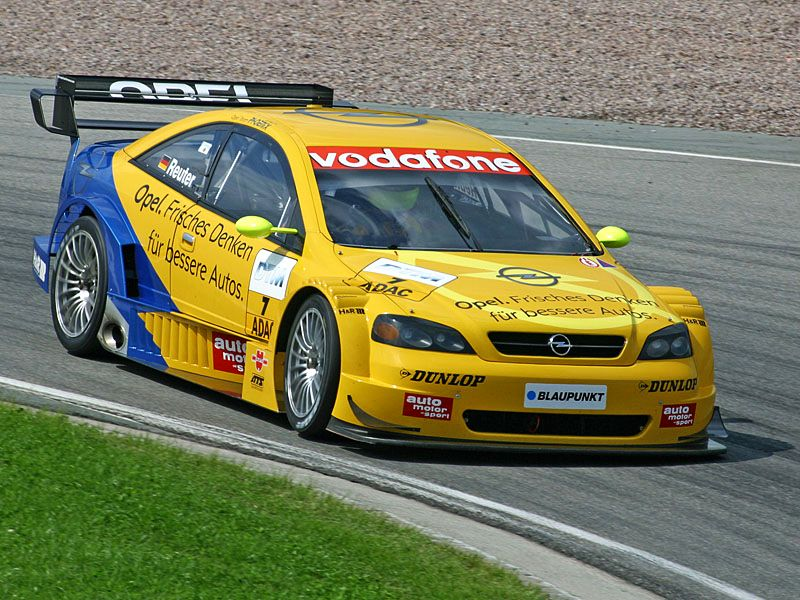
Manuel Reuter competing in the DTM for Opel

Wiet Huidekoper was born in Bussum in the Netherlands where he grew up. Following his study at the Delft University of Technology Huidekoper worked at Fokker, the Dutch aircraft manufacturer. In the autumn of 1979 he moved to the UK to seek a career in the motor racing industry. The first car he designed and constructed was the Chinell W16/83 Formula Ford 1600. He was then hired by Royale to develop their existing and until then under-performing Formula Ford: the RP33. This was followed by the design of a new Formula Ford car, the RP36's of which 14 were built. In the British Formula Ford Championships, John Village won races at Silverstone in 1984 and the RP36 won the Champion of Oulton Park Championship driven by Don Hardman. Although at the beginning of 1984 Huidekoper had already moved on to Reynard Racing Cars, where he concentrated on designing their new cars for the 1985 season. At Reynard, Huidekoper created a hub system for both the Formula Ford and the Formula-3 cars, which is continued to be used on all Dallara Formula-3 cars from the late 19-eighties onwards.

In the period 1985 to 1989 Huidekoper worked as a consultant engineer for various motor racing teams such as Reynard Racing Cars, Spirit Racing, EuroBrun, and during the 1989 season Huidekoper ran the Spice-Cosworth in the C2 category of the World Sportscar Championship for the team Chamberlain Engineering. The car was driven by Nick Adams (GB) and Fermin Velez (E) and they won the World Championship for C2 that year.

In 1990 he joined Lola Cars to design their new Group-C car for the new 3.5 litre 750 kg category. The Lola T92/10 was for the 1992 season, with initial design work starting in the summer of 1990. In April 1992 in a meeting chaired by Bernie Ecclestone it was decided that 1992 was to be the last season for the Group-C category and the World Sportscar Championship. Thus the Judd V10 engined car sold only to one team: Euroracing and received no meaningful development form Lola Cars, who were forced by this decision to cut their losses.

For 1993 Huidekoper designed the Vector Formula Fords, which raced first on the continent of Europe and in the USA in FF1600, FF2000 and FF-Zetec form. Vector Racing Cars was formed by Huidekoper together with Chris Fox of Fox Racing Developments. 17 Vector cars were sold during their first year. Dutch racing driver Tom Coronel started his career driving a Vector, winning most races he entered. In 1994 Jason Watt won almost all major UK Formula Ford events in the Vector TF94 to win the major UK based Formula Ford titles.

Huidekoper joined Porsche in 1994 for their efforts in that year's edition of the 24 Hours of Le Mans, competing with the Dauer-Porsche 962LM. Taking advantage of the rules, the outdated Group C race car was converted into a road-going GT to re-enter as a race car. It won the 1994 24 Hours of Le Mans. Porsche hired Huidekoper for their subsequent Le Mans Porsche 911 GT1 cars and his initial responsibilities were the chassis and body structures of the Porsche 911 GT1-96 and the GT1-97 versions. These did not win, being beaten twice by a Porsche-powered open-top sports car. For the quite different Porsche 911 GT1-98 "Evo", Huidekoper got overall constructive responsibility and it was an all new carbon composite car, featuring a carbon fiber monocoque. Its construction was based on that of Huidekoper's earlier design for the Lola T92/10. That year the Porsche 911 GT1-98 won the main prize for sports racing cars, the 1998 24 Hours of Le Mans, finishing in first and second positions. The 1998 FIA GT Championship was dominated by Mercedes, though, and the series folded after 1998. Even though the Porsche LMP2000 was in development, the project was altered and eventually cancelled in 1999.

In Spring 2000 Huidekoper became the consultant designer for the Dallara SP1 Chrysler LMP1 for the French Oreca racing team. The car was originally designed for the Judd V10 in 4.0 litre trim, until Oreca, who had success in GT2 with the V10-powered Chrysler Viper GTS-R, bought the rights to the car and had the Chrysler Mopar 6.0L V8 engine fitted for the 2001 season. For 2002 the cars were converted back to take the Judd V10 engine and continued to compete successfully in all major Sportscar Championships until 2005.

In 2001 Huidekoper was appointed by Dallara to be the project leader/chief designer for the 3.5 litre V6 Formula Nissan car. In 2003 the car became known as the Formula Renault 3.5 for the Formula Renault World Series, when Renault gained control of the Nissan Motor Company. These cars continued to be raced successfully in this form until the end of 2015 and were the stepping stone for a number of Formula-1 drivers.

In October 2002 Volker Strycek appointed Huidekoper technical director of Opel Performance Center. Huidekoper was responsible to develop the Deutsche Tourenwagen Masters (DTM) programme for the 2003 season. Previously Opel struggled to compete with Audi and Mercedes. Huidekoper set up a new design team and improved the decision-making process with regard to technical changes to the car. Peter Dumbreck and Alain Menu scored several podium finishes for the marque during 2003 Deutsche Tourenwagen Masters. The highlight of that year was winning the Nürburgring 24 Hours with a DTM-derived V8 Astra against three-time winner Zakspeed Viper, Abt-Audi DTM (Mercedes remained absent), BMW GTR, and turbocharged Porsches. At the end of that season Huidekoper left Opel.

In total Huidekoper designed over 35 different racing cars for various categories with their collective production number exceeding 800 cars. At the end of his life, Huidekoper was active in the automotive industry through his engineering consultancy Motorsports Design Consultants Ltd in the UK for various racing organisations and to develop carbon composite products for the automotive industry such as crash energy absorbing structures, wheel rims, chassis structures, etc. Huidekoper held patents for automotive hub systems, "hub-centre-steering" solutions for motor cycles, carbon composite automotive wheel rims and folding bicycles.
