= Formula F100 =

Former Formula racing class

- Category: Light weight sports cars
- Country: United Kingdom
- Inaugural season: 1970
- Folded: 1971
- Constructors: Nerus; Merlyn; Royale; Aldon; Elden
- Engine suppliers: Ford Kent; BMC
- Tyre suppliers: Firestone F100

The Formula F100 was a racing class in 1970 and 1971. The class was open to lightweight sports cars powered by a 1300cc engine (usually a Ford Kent engine or 1300cc BMC engine).

== History ==
The Formula F100 was launched by Geoff Clarke and the Motor Racing Stables racing school. Clarke also launched Formula Ford and thought that Formula F100 could be the sports car racing equivalent. The British press gave the F100 a far from warm welcome, fearing that the class would rival the popular Clubmans. The first season was dominated by Ray Allen driving a Royale RP4. The car was first powered by a Ford Kent engine. But when Nick Cole became the faster driver in a BMC powered Nerus Silhouette, Allen quickly changed engines. Former Formula 1 driver Les Leston came out of retirement to race in the series. The 49-year-old Briton was competitive towards the end of the season. The season started slow with few car counts, but at the end of the season there were 12 cars on the grid. The 1971 season was dominated by Tom Pryce. The young talent won eight of the 20 races. The series' final race at Brands Hatch on December 27, 1971 proved to be a farce as only one driver made the grid. The class eventually folded and the very popular Clubmans class prevailed.

== Cars ==
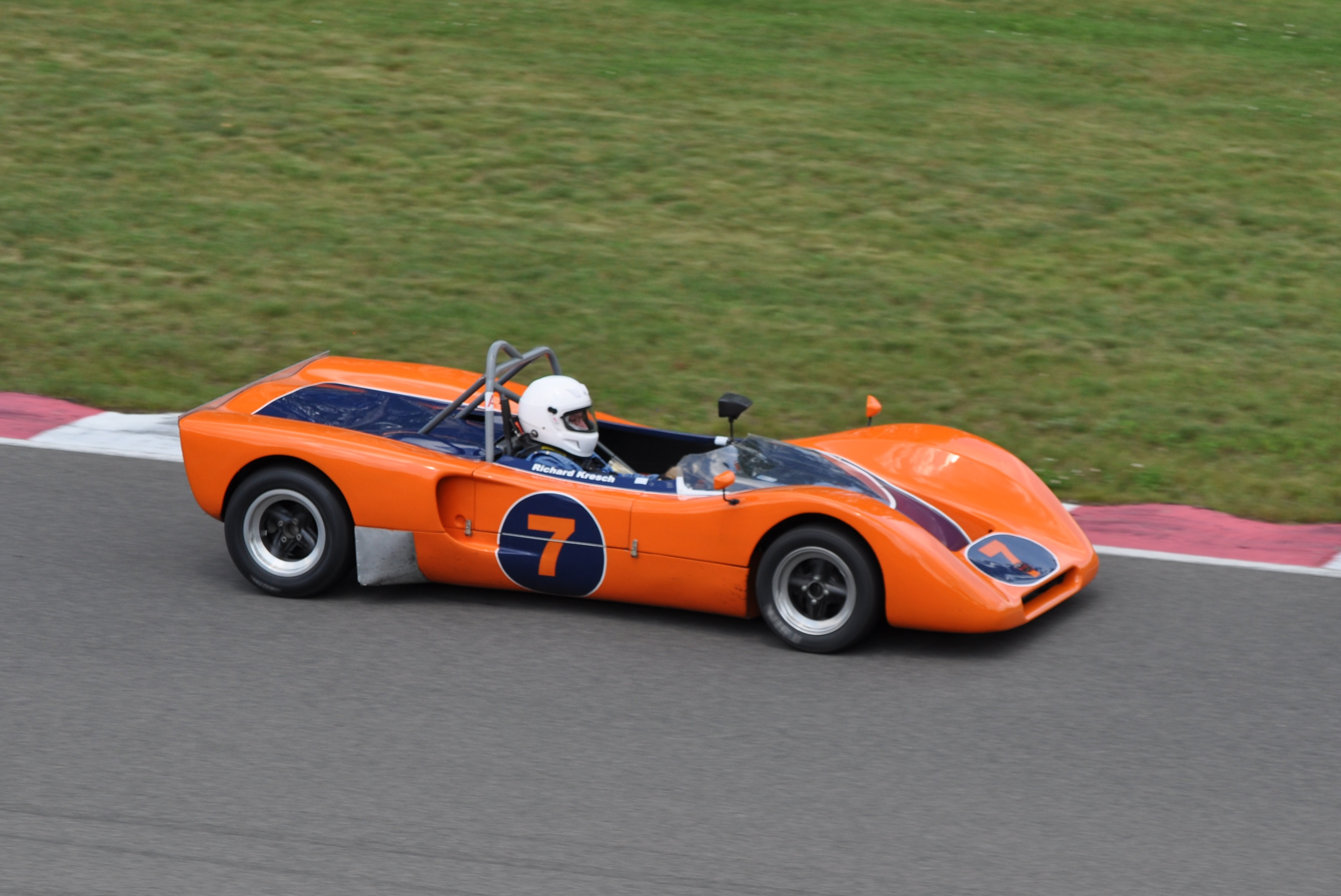
A Royale RP4 F100 during a historic race meeting at Mont Tremblant in 2010.

The lightweight sports cars were built by various manufacturers. The Royale RP4, Merlyn MK 16, Aldon F100 and the Nerus Silhouette are examples of Formula F100 cars. Cars were fitted with a 1.300cc Ford Kent Crossflow engine. The engine was derived of the Formula Ford 1600. Despite the 300cc smaller engine, the cars were only slightly slower than Formula Ford due to their superior aerodynamics. All cars were fitted with spec Hewland transmission and Firestone tyres.

Car	Model	Number built
Aldon	F100	
Alexis	19	2
Dulon	LD10	
DRW	95	
Elden	MK7	3
Landar	R7	
Mantis		
Merlyn	MK 16	
Milmor	MK6	
Nerus	Silhouette	2
Nike		
Raffo	JB100	
Royale	RP4	11

== Champions ==
Year	Driver	Car	Engine
1970	(United Kingdom) Ray Allen	Royale RP4	Ford Kent
1970	(United Kingdom) Ray Allen	Royale RP4	BMC
1971	(United Kingdom) Tom Pryce	Royale RP4	???
