= Ken Johnson (racing driver) =

American racing driver

Ken Johnson (born November 28, 1962, in Memphis, Tennessee, United States) is a former driver in the CART series.

Johnson began his professional racing career in Formula Super Vee, winning the SCCA Pro National Championship in 1985. In 1986, Johnson attempted the first five International Formula 3000 races for BS Automotive. He qualified three times and finished ninth at Vallelunga circuit. That fall, he made one American Racing Series start at the Mid-Ohio Sports Car Course. In 1988, he made his CART debut at Laguna Seca for Hemelgarn Racing and finished 12th, scoring one point - good enough for 36th in the championship. In 1989, he again drove in the Laguna Seca CART race, this time for Dale Coyne Racing but his engine expired six laps into the race. He later made three starts in the SCCA World Challenge in 1990 and finished 8th in the Toyota Atlantic race at Long Beach in 1992.

== Motorsports career results ==
=== International Formula 3000 results ===
(key) (Races in bold indicate pole position; races in italics indicate fastest lap.)

Year	Entrant	1	2	3	4	5	6	7	8	9	10	11	DC	Points
1986	BS Automotive	SIL; Ret	VAL; 9	PAU; DNQ	SPA; 18	IMO; DNQ	MUG	PER	ÖST	BIR	BUG	JAR	**NC**	**0**

=== American open–wheel results ===
(key) (Races in bold indicate pole position)

==== Formula Super Vee ====
Year	Team	Chassis	Engine	1	2	3	4	5	6	7	8	9	10	11	12	Rank	Points
1985	Provimi / Hagen	Ralt RT5/84	VW Brabham	**LBH**; 2	IRP; 10	MIL; 3	DET; 4	MEA; 1	CLE; 6	ROA; 5	WGI; 4	MOH; 5	SAN; 3	LS; 10	PHX; 4	**1st**	**144**

==== Toyota Atlantic Championship ====
Year	Team	1	2	3	4	5	6	7	8	9	10	11	12	13	14	Rank	Points
1992	Kodalux Processing Services	MIA	PHX	LBH; 8	LIM	MON	WGL; DNS	TOR	TRR	VAN	MOH	MOS	NAZ	LS1	LS2	**35th**	**8**

==== CART/Indy Car ====
Year	Team	1	2	3	4	5	6	7	8	9	10	11	12	13	14	15	Rank	Points	Ref
1988	Hemelgarn Racing	PHO	LBG	IND	MIL	POR	CLE	TOR	MEA	MCH	POC	MOH	ROA	NAZ	LAG; 12	MIA	**36th**	**1**	
1989	Dale Coyne Racing	PHO	LBG	IND	MIL	DET	POR	CLE	MEA	TOR	MCH	POC	MOH	ROA	NAZ	LAG; 27	**52nd**	**0**	

Sporting positions
Preceded by Arie Luyendyk	US Formula Super Vee; Champion; 1985	Succeeded by Didier Theys
