= Peter Kuhn =

American racing driver (1955–2009)

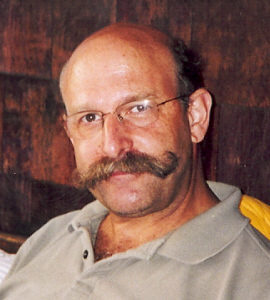
- Peter Kuhn

Peter Kuhn (April 14, 1955, in Summit, New Jersey – June 25, 2009, in Stafford Township, New Jersey ) was an American race car driver. In 1980, he won both the USAC and SCCA Formula Super Vee championships. Late in the 1984 season, he competed in the CART World Series for McCray Racing, making his debut at the Mid-Ohio Sports Car Course, but was knocked out after 20 laps by a broken gearbox. A week later, he failed to qualify at Sanair Super Speedway. In his next race at Michigan International Speedway, he registered his best finish of 16th. His final start came at Laguna Seca Raceway, but he was sidelined after 14 laps by engine overheating. He later became the executive vice president and general manager for ROBCO Racing Team and an American Le Mans Series team owner.

Born in Summit, New Jersey, Kohn had been a resident of Chatham Township and the Basking Ridge section of Bernards Township.

After leaving the world of motor sports to focus on his family, Kuhn became a self-employed contractor. On June 25, 2009, he died of a heart attack while body surfing in Long Beach Island, New Jersey.

== Honours ==
=== SCCA Super Vee (USA) ===
- 1980

=== USAC Mini-Indy (USA) ===
- 1980

== Racing record ==
=== SCCA National Championship Runoffs ===
Year	Track	Car	Engine	Class	Finish	Start	Status
1978	Road Atlanta	Van Diemen	Ford	Formula Ford	3	2	Running

=== Formula Super Vee ===
Year	Team	Chassis	Engine	1	2	3	4	5	6	7	8	9	10	11	12	13	14	Rank	Points
1980	Bill Scott Racing, Driftwood-BSR	Ralt RT1/78, RT5/80	VW Brabham	CLT; Ret	MIL; Ret	POC; 6	WG1; Ret	MOH; 7	ROA; 1	BRN; 1	MN1; 1	MN2; 1	ONT; 3	MCH; 1	WG2; 2	RIV; 3	PHX; 4	1st	123

=== Complete USAC Mini-Indy Series results ===
Year	Entrant	1	2	3	4	5	6	Pos	Points
1980	Driftwood Racing	MIL; 20	POC; 6	MOH; 7	MIN1; 1	MIN2; 1	ONT; 3	1st	684

=== Complete CART Indy Car Series results ===
Year	Entrant	Chassis	Engine	1	2	3	4	5	6	7	8	9	10	11	12	13	14	15	16	Pos	Points	Ref
1984	McCray Racing	Penske	Cosworth	LBH	PHX	INDY	MIL	POR	MEA	CLE	MIC	ROA	POC	MOH; 20	SAN; DNQ	MIC; 16	PHX	LAG; 25	CPL	40th	0	

Sporting positions
Preceded by Geoff Brabham	US Formula Super Vee; Champion; 1980	Succeeded by Al Unser Jr.
Preceded by Dennis Firestone	USAC Mini-Indy Series; Champion; 1980	Succeeded by none
