= Eddie Miller (racing driver, born 1945) =

American racing driver (1945–2021)

- Nationality: American
- Born: January 17, 1945 Lakewood, Colorado, U.S.
- Died: April 24, 2021 (aged 76) San Carlos Nuevo Guaymas, Mexico
- Retired: 1977

Championship titles
- 1972, 1974 1975: SCCA Formula Ford Runoffs; Formula Super Vee

Edward Hayes Miller (January 17, 1945 – April 24, 2021) was a racing driver from Colorado in the United States (not to be confused with the racing driver of the same name born October 7, 1895). Miller drove for Carl Haas in Formula Ford and Formula Super Vee. He also competed in Formula 5000 and Indy Car until a near fatal crash during practice for the 1976 Indianapolis 500 curtailed Miller's career. Miller won the United States Formula Ford National Championship twice, in 1972 and 1974, and he won the US Formula Super Vee title in 1975.

== American Open Wheel racing results ==
(key)

=== SCCA National Championship Runoffs ===
Year	Track	Car	Engine	Class	Finish	Start	Status
1972	Road Atlanta	Hawke DL2B	Ford	Formula Ford	1	8	Running
1974	Road Atlanta	Lola T340	Ford	Formula Ford	1	9	Running

=== Formula Super Vee ===
Formula Super Vee results
Year	Team	Chassis	Engine	1	2	3	4	5	6	7	8	9	10	11	Rank	Points
1975	Haas Motorsports	Lola T324/75	VW Brabham	DAY1; DNS	SEB; DNS	ATL; 1	LS; 20	RIV; 1	LRP; 1	WGI1; 8	ROA; 1	MOS; 1	WGI2; 2	DAY2; 33	118	1st

=== Formula 5000 (SCCA L&M Championship) ===
Formula 5000 results
Year	Team	Chassis	Engine	1	2	3	4	5	6	7	8	9	Rank	Points
1973	Team RPMM	Lola T330	Chevrolet	RIV; DNS	LS; 8	MIS; 11	MOH; 14	WGI1; RET	ROA; DNS	RAL; 13	POC; DNS	SEA; DNS	3	26th

=== Indianapolis 500 ===
Year	Chassis	Engine	Start	Finish	Team
1976	Eagle	Ford Cosworth DFX	Practice Crash		Thermo-King

Sporting positions
Preceded by Jim Harrell	US Formula Ford National Championship; Champion; 1972	Succeeded by Bob Earl
Preceded by Bob Earl	US Formula Ford National Championship; Champion; 1974	Succeeded by Tom Wiechmann
Preceded by Elliott Forbes-Robinson	US Formula Super Vee; Champion; 1975	Succeeded by Tom Bagley
