= John Finger =

American racing driver (born 1943)

- Born: December 20, 1943 (age 82); Greenville, South Carolina, U.S.

NASCAR O'Reilly Auto Parts Series career
- 1 race run over 1 year
- Best finish: 107th (2001)
- First race: 2001 GNC Live Well 200 (Watkins Glen)
| Wins | Top tens | Poles |
|---|---|---|
| 0 | 0 | 0 |

ARCA Menards Series career
- 1 race run over 1 year
- Best finish: 107th (2001)
- First race: 2001 BetOnUSA.com 150 (Watkins Glen)
- First win: 2001 BetOnUSA.com 150 (Watkins Glen)
| Wins | Top tens | Poles |
|---|---|---|
| 1 | 1 | 0 |
- Statistics up to date as of November 27, 2024.

John Finger (born December 20, 1943) is an American former professional auto racing driver who has competed in the NASCAR Busch Series, the NASCAR Busch North Series, and the ARCA Re/Max Series. He is also a former winner in his class in the 24 Hours at Daytona, having won in the AGT class in 2000 alongside Doug Mills, Richard Maugeri, Andy McNeil, and Ron Zizta.

Finger has also previously competed in the IMCA Stock Car Series, the SCCA Robert Bosch-VW Super Vee Championship, the IMSA GT Championship, and the Trans Am Championship.

== Motorsports results ==
=== NASCAR ===
(key) (Bold - Pole position awarded by qualifying time. Italics - Pole position earned by points standings or practice time. * – Most laps led.)

==== Busch Series ====
NASCAR Busch Series results
| Year | Team | No. | Make | 1 | 2 | 3 | 4 | 5 | 6 | 7 | 8 | 9 | 10 | 11 | 12 | 13 | 14 | 15 | 16 | 17 | 18 | 19 | 20 | 21 | 22 | 23 | 24 | 25 | 26 | 27 | 28 | 29 | 30 | 31 | 32 | 33 | 34 | 35 | NBSC | Pts | Ref |
|---|---|---|---|---|---|---|---|---|---|---|---|---|---|---|---|---|---|---|---|---|---|---|---|---|---|---|---|---|---|---|---|---|---|---|---|---|---|---|---|---|---|
| 2001 | PRW Racing | 77 | Ford | DAY | CAR | LVS | ATL | DAR | BRI | TEX | NSH | TAL | CAL | RCH | NHA | NZH | CLT | DOV | KEN | MLW | GLN; 24 | CHI | GTY | PPR | IRP | MCH | BRI | DAR | RCH | DOV | KAN | CLT | MEM | PHO | CAR | HOM | | | 107th | 91 | |
| 2006 | Jay Robinson Racing | 49 | Ford | DAY | CAL | MXC | LVS | ATL | BRI | TEX | NSH | PHO | TAL | RCH | DAR | CLT | DOV | NSH | KEN | MLW | DAY | CHI | NHA | MAR | GTY | IRP | GLN; DNQ | MCH | BRI | CAL | RCH | DOV | KAN | CLT | MEM | TEX | PHO | HOM | N/A | 0 | |

==== Busch North Series ====
NASCAR Busch North Series results
| Year | Team | No. | Make | 1 | 2 | 3 | 4 | 5 | 6 | 7 | 8 | 9 | 10 | 11 | 12 | 13 | 14 | 15 | 16 | 17 | 18 | 19 | 20 | NBNSC | Pts | Ref |
|---|---|---|---|---|---|---|---|---|---|---|---|---|---|---|---|---|---|---|---|---|---|---|---|---|---|---|
| 2001 | N/A | 03 | Chevy | LEE | NHA | SEE | HOL | BEE | EPP | STA | WFD | BEE | TMP | NHA | STA | SEE | GLN; 22 | NZH | THU | BEE | DOV | STA | LRP | 71st | 97 | |

=== ARCA Re/Max Series ===
(key) (Bold – Pole position awarded by qualifying time. Italics – Pole position earned by points standings or practice time. * – Most laps led. ** – All laps led.)

ARCA Re/Max Series results
| Year | Team | No. | Make | 1 | 2 | 3 | 4 | 5 | 6 | 7 | 8 | 9 | 10 | 11 | 12 | 13 | 14 | 15 | 16 | 17 | 18 | 19 | 20 | 21 | 22 | 23 | 24 | 25 | ARMSC | Pts | Ref |
|---|---|---|---|---|---|---|---|---|---|---|---|---|---|---|---|---|---|---|---|---|---|---|---|---|---|---|---|---|---|---|---|
| 2001 | Carol Hipp | 03 | Ford | DAY | NSH | WIN | SLM | GTY | KEN | CLT | KAN | MCH | POC | MEM | GLN; 1 | KEN | MCH | POC | NSH | ISF | CHI | DSF | SLM | TOL | BLN | CLT | TAL | ATL | 107th | 235 | |
