= Elliott Forbes-Robinson =

American racing driver

- Born: October 31, 1943 (age 83); La Crescenta, California, U.S.

NASCAR Cup Series career
- 22 races run over 5 years
- Best finish: 35th- 1981 (Winston Cup)
- First race: 1977 Daytona 500 (Daytona)
- Last race: 1984 Atlanta Journal 500 (Atlanta)
Wins	Top tens	Poles
0	3	0

Elliott Forbes-Robinson (born October 31, 1943, in La Crescenta, California) is an American road racing race car driver. He is known for his race wins and championships in many different series, including the American Le Mans Series (ALMS), Super Vee, Trans-Am Series, CanAm, IMSA GTU, and the World Challenge. He is known in NASCAR circles as a road course ringer. He is also a founder of the Legends Cars of 600 Racing and he designed their original car.

== Racing career ==
SCCA

1970 ARRC National Championships C production. Porsche 914-6 fourth in C production

1972 VW Gold Cup Super Vee 4th place overall in points. 2 Wins Riverside and Portland International Raceway

1972 SCCA ARRC National Championships E Production. Porsche 914. Results Pole position, Track record, Overall win by over 30 seconds. DQ'd in post-race inspection.

1974 VW Gold Cup Super Vee championship. Seven victories and four finishes in fifth or better out of the 13 races he entered.

Forbes-Robinson was the 1982 champion of the Trans-Am Series.

Forbes-Robinson co-won the 1987 Grand Prix of Miami with Geoff Brabham. In 1988, he took over the driver's seat from car owner Rick Hendrick during the final NASCAR race at Riverside International Raceway.

In the mid-1990s, Forbes-Robinson competed in SCCA, IMSA’s GTU, the Pikes Peak International Hillclimb, and the World Sportscar Championship.

In 1991, Forbes-Robinson drove with Robby and Johnny Unser the 24 Hours of Nürburgring for Porsche [911 Cup/ with Herbert Linge + Dr. K.R.Schuster].

In 1997, Forbes-Robinson won the overall win at the 24 Hours of Daytona.

In 1999, Forbes-Robinson repeated as the overall winner at the 24 Hours of Daytona. He won the inaugural ALMS championship with teammate Butch Leitzinger for Dyson Racing.

Forbes-Robinson won the SR Class at the 2000 24 Hours of Daytona, and finished fifth in the class’ points standings.

Forbes-Robinson finished seventh the 2001 SRP class points, with a second-place finish in eight starts.

Forbes-Robinson had three SRP starts in 2002. He finished third in his only SRP II start.

Forbes-Robinson was the 2003 Rolex Vintage Enduro Car champion.

Forbes-Robinson raced in The Rolex Series in 2004, and had eight Top-5 finishes in eleven races. He co-drove with Leitzinger. He raced in the No. 4 Pontiac-Crawford Daytona Prototype car for Howard-Boss Motorsports.

Forbes-Robinson continued his relationship with Boss Motorsports co-driving with Leitzinger in 2005. The duo won at Mid-Ohio, and had second-place finishes at the 24 Hours of Daytona, Homestead, and Laguna Seca in seven races. They finished fifth in the final series points.

== Road racing career totals ==
Forbes-Robinson has had 51 major victories in his 30-year career. His victory co-driving with Butch Leitzinger at the 2004 Porsche 250 at Barber Motorsports Park gave him victories in five consecutive decades.

== Awards ==
Forbes-Robinson was inducted in the Motorsports Hall of Fame of America in 2006.

== Racing record ==
=== SCCA National Championship Runoffs ===
Year	Track	Car	Engine	Class	Finish	Start	Status
1969	Daytona International Raceway	Porsche 911	Porsche	B Sedan	3	10	Running
1970	Road Atlanta	Porsche 914/6	Porsche	C Production	4	7	Running
1972	Road Atlanta	Porsche 914	Porsche	E Production	21	1	Disqualified
1973	Road Atlanta	Porsche 914	Porsche	E Production	19	3	Retired
1976	Road Atlanta	Nissan 280Z	Nissan	C Production	1	1	Running
1976	Road Atlanta	Nissan 610	Nissan	B Sedan	1	1	Running
1978	Road Atlanta	Chevrolet Corvette	Chevrolet	A Production	1	1	Running

=== Formula Super Vee ===
Year	Team	Chassis	Engine	1	2	3	4	5	6	7	8	9	10	11	12	13	14	Rank	Points
1974	Lynn Racing	Lola	VW Brabham	**ROL1**; 2	**LRP**; 1	LS; 1	ONT; 3	MOH	ROL2; 1	WG1; 5	CRT; 1	ROA; 27	LRP	MOS; 1	**WG2**; 1	**MEX**; 1	**DAY**; 4	**1st**	**185**

=== NASCAR ===
(key) (Bold – Pole position awarded by qualifying time. Italics – Pole position earned by points standings or practice time. * – Most laps led.)

==== Winston Cup Series ====
NASCAR Winston Cup Series results
Year	Team	No.	Make	1	2	3	4	5	6	7	8	9	10	11	12	13	14	15	16	17	18	19	20	21	22	23	24	25	26	27	28	29	30	31	NWCC	Pts	Ref
1976	Howard & Egerton Racing	6	Chevy	RSD	DAY; DNQ	CAR	RCH	BRI	ATL	NWS	DAR	MAR	TAL	NSV	DOV	CLT	RSD	MCH	DAY	NSV	POC	TAL	MCH	BRI	DAR	RCH	DOV	MAR	NWS	CLT	CAR	ATL	ONT		NA	-	
1977	Harris Racing	87	Dodge	RSD	DAY; 40	RCH																													69th	201	
1977	Midgley Racing	29	Dodge				CAR; 20	ATL; 36	NWS	DAR	BRI	MAR	TAL	NSV	DOV	CLT	RSD	MCH	DAY	NSV	POC	TAL	MCH	BRI	DAR	RCH	DOV	MAR	NWS	CLT	CAR	ATL	ONT		69th	201	
1981	Howard & Egerton Racing	86	Buick	RSD; 8	DAY; 25	RCH	CAR; 10	ATL; 39					TAL; 16	NSV	DOV	CLT; 10	TWS	RSD; 35	MCH	DAY; 23	NSV	POC	TAL; 12	MCH											35th	1020	
1981	Howard & Egerton Racing	86	Olds						BRI; 27	NWS	DAR	MAR																							35th	1020	
1981	Ulrich Racing	40	Buick																						BRI; 23	DAR	RCH	DOV	MAR	NWS	CLT	CAR	ATL	RSD	35th	1020	
1982	Cronkrite Racing	96	Buick	DAY; 28	RCH	BRI	ATL; 40	CAR	DAR	NWS	MAR	TAL; 29	NSV	DOV	CLT	POC	RSD	MCH	DAY	NSV	POC	TAL	MCH	BRI	DAR	RCH	DOV	NWS	CLT	MAR	CAR	ATL	RSD		68th	155	
1983	Bahre Racing	23	Buick	DAY; 40	RCH	CAR	ATL	DAR	NWS	MAR	TAL	NSV	DOV	BRI	CLT	RSD	POC	MCH	DAY	NSV	POC	TAL	MCH	BRI	DAR	RCH	DOV	MAR	NWS	CLT	CAR	ATL	RSD		101st	43	
1984	Bahre Racing	23	Olds	DAY; DNQ	RCH	CAR	ATL	BRI	NWS	DAR	MAR																								45th	349	
1984	Harrington Racing	2	Buick									TAL; 39	NSV	DOV	CLT	RSD	POC	MCH; 24	DAY	NSV	POC								CLT; 20	NWS	CAR	ATL; 19	RSD		45th	349	
1984	Harrington Racing	2	Chevy																			TAL; 38	MCH	BRI	DAR	RCH	DOV	MAR							45th	349	

===== Daytona 500 =====
Year	Team	Manufacturer	Start	Finish
1976	Howard & Egerton Racing	Chevrolet	DNQ	
1977	Harris Racing	Dodge	16	40
1981	Howard & Egerton Racing	Buick	37	25
1982	Cronkrite Racing	Buick	18	28
1983	Bahre Racing	Buick	19	40
1984	Bahre Racing	Oldsmobile	DNQ	

=== 24 Hours of Le Mans results ===
24 Hours of Le Mans results
Year	Team	Co-Drivers	Car	Class	Laps	Pos.	Class Pos.
1971	(United States) Richie Ginther Racing	(United States) Alan Johnson	Porsche 911S	GT +2.0	50	DNF	DNF
1989	(Japan) Mazdaspeed Co. Ltd.	(Japan) Takashi Yorino (Belgium) Hervé Regout	Mazda 767B	GTP	365	9th	**2nd**

== See also ==
- Motorsports Hall of Fame of America
- Legends car racing

Sporting positions
Preceded by Bertil Roos	US Formula Super Vee; Champion; 1974	Succeeded by Eddie Miller
