= Bertil Roos =

Swedish racing driver (1943–2016)

- Born: Bertil Ingemar Roos; 12 October 1943; Gothenburg, Sweden
- Died: 31 March 2016 (aged 72); East Stroudsburg, Pennsylvania, U.S.

Formula One World Championship career
- Nationality: (Sweden) Swedish
- Active years: 1974
- Team: Shadow
- Entries: 1
- Championships: 0
- Wins: 0
- Podiums: 0
- Career points: 0
- Pole positions: 0
- Fastest laps: 0
- First entry: 1974 Swedish Grand Prix

Bertil Ingemar Roos (12 October 1943 – 31 March 2016) was a Swedish racing driver from Gothenburg. He participated in a single Formula One Grand Prix, his home race in 1974, from which he retired with transmission failure.

== Career ==
Despite enjoying early promise in winning the US Formula Super Vee title in 1973, and also doing well in Formula 2 in Europe and Formula Atlantic in Canada, Roos only received one shot at Formula One. He and his team, Shadow, did not get on particularly well, and ultimately the team chose to work with Tom Pryce instead. Roos went back to the US and Canada, where he continued racing.

Roos was the senior driving instructor for the Fred Opert racing school in Pennsylvania, USA near Pocono Raceway, a business that he later purchased.

Still racing in the 1980s, Roos was a two-time Can-Am champion in the 2 liter and under category.

Roos died at Pocono Medical Center, East Stroudsburg Pennsylvania, on 31 March 2016.

== Racing record ==
=== US Formula Super Vee ===
Year	Team	Chassis	Engine	1	2	3	4	5	6	7	8	9	Rank	Points
1973		TUI BH3	VW Brabham	LRP; 1	WG1; 1	ROL; Ret	WG2; 1	ROA; Ret	POC; 5	SIR	LS; 6	RIV; 3	1st	86

=== SCCA National Championship Runoffs ===
Year	Track	Car	Engine	Class	Finish	Start	Status
1987	Road Atlanta	Martini Mk. 47		Formula Atlantic	13	4	DNF

=== Complete Formula One results ===
(key)

Year	Entrant	Chassis	Engine	1	2	3	4	5	6	7	8	9	10	11	12	13	14	15	WDC	Points
1974	UOP Shadow Racing Team	Shadow DN3	Cosworth V8	ARG	BRA	RSA	ESP	BEL	MON	SWE; Ret	NED	FRA	GBR	GER	AUT	ITA	CAN	USA	NC	0

Sporting positions
Preceded by Bill Scott	US Formula Super Vee; Champion; 1973	Succeeded by Elliott Forbes-Robinson
