= Formula Super Vee =

Race car class

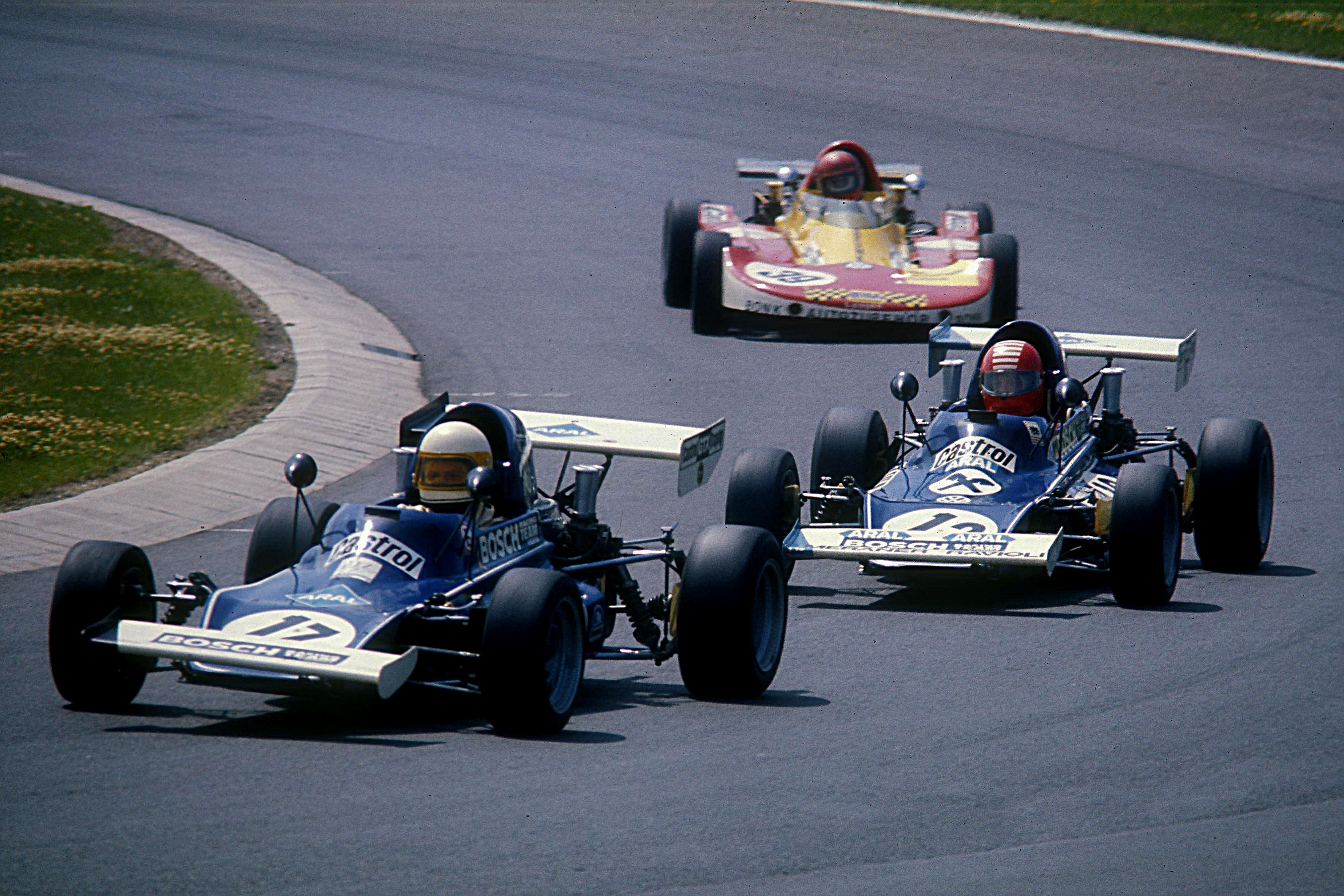
Formula Super Vee racing at Nürburgring in 1975.

Formula Super Vee was an open-wheel racing series that took place in Europe and the United States from 1970 to 1990. The formula was created as an extension of Formula Vee, a racing class that was introduced in 1959. Formula Super Vee in Europe was similar to F3 or Formula Renault today, a stepping stone to F1. In the United States, Formula Super Vee, often referred to as Super Vee, was a natural progression to Indy Car and Can-Am. On both sides of the Atlantic the series also was a platform for the promotion of VW products, similar to how Formula Renault promotes Renault products today.

Initially it was seen as a simple step up from Formula Vee, using Volkswagen air-cooled engines, only Type 3 engines in 1600cc as opposed to Type 1 engines in 1200cc or 1600cc. However it soon transformed to using the very different and more powerful fuel injected water-cooled engines from the VW Golf/Rabbit.

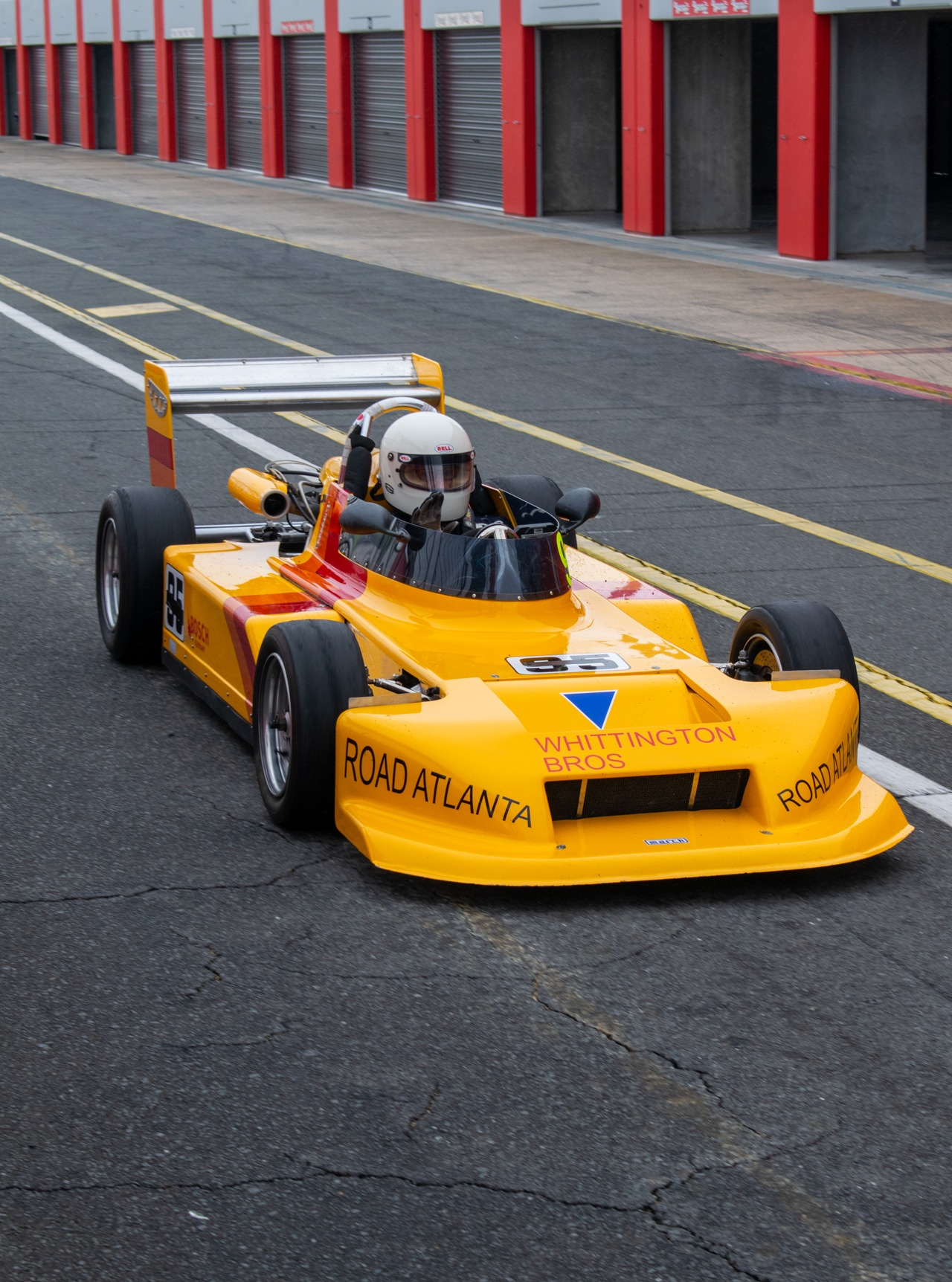
March Super Vee in the pitlane of Queensland Raceway

== History ==
To assist the launch of the new formula Volkswagen of America's, Jo Hoppen, commissioned Gene Beach, an established constructor of Formula Vee cars, to design and build the first Super Vee and put this car on display at the Daytona 24 hour race. Beach was one of the first three constructors of Formula Vees, along with Autodynamics and Formcar. It is therefore appropriate that a Super Vee designed and built by Ray Caldwell's Autodynamics concern soon joined the Beach Super Vee. This second Super Vee (the Caldwell D-10) was put on display at the New York Auto Show. Other manufacturers soon followed suit, with Formula Vee constructors such as Zink Cars joined by more mainstream firms such as Lola. John Zeitler also built his first cars around the same time as Beach and Caldwell. As a matter of fact, John Zeitler won the very first Super Vee race at Lime Rock Park in 1970. This race was run with the Formula Ford class.

Initially the series allowed 1600cc air-cooled engines of either type 3 (as used in the VW 1500 and 1600) or type 4 (as used in the VW 411, 412 and the VW-Porsche 914/4 sports car), however at a late stage VW had a change of heart and decided that the type 4 engines would be a better option. The type 4 engine is without doubt a better engine. However, this motor was never produced in a 1600cc version so VW decided to produce a "special" 1600cc version through their industrial engines division (the 127V unit), with smaller pistons and barrels, which reduced the capacity to 1600cc.

As with any formula, Formula Super Vee progressed through a number of changes during its life. Initially, for example, the cars ran without wings and used drum brakes at the rear. Later the regulations allowed the use of 8-inch rear wheels, rear disc brakes and 34 mm exhaust valves (1973) and then rear wings (1975). Since slick tyres had yet to be introduced into racing, the cars ran with treaded racing tyres, such as the Firestone "No-DOT", but later moved onto slicks.

The original regulations specified a non-Hewland gearbox and cars ran with fixed ratio VW boxes. In Europe a company called Metso began building Hewland-like boxes which provided the ability to change ratios to suit each circuit and exploited the wording of the regulations, which had simply banned Hewland boxes rather than explicitly specifying the fixed ratio VW box. Once the cars started to use Metso boxes the regulations were changed and Hewland Gearboxes were also allowed. This change, combined with start money being offered by Hewland to drivers using its products, effectively put Metso out of business, although the company did build boxes for other formula cars such as Formula Fords.

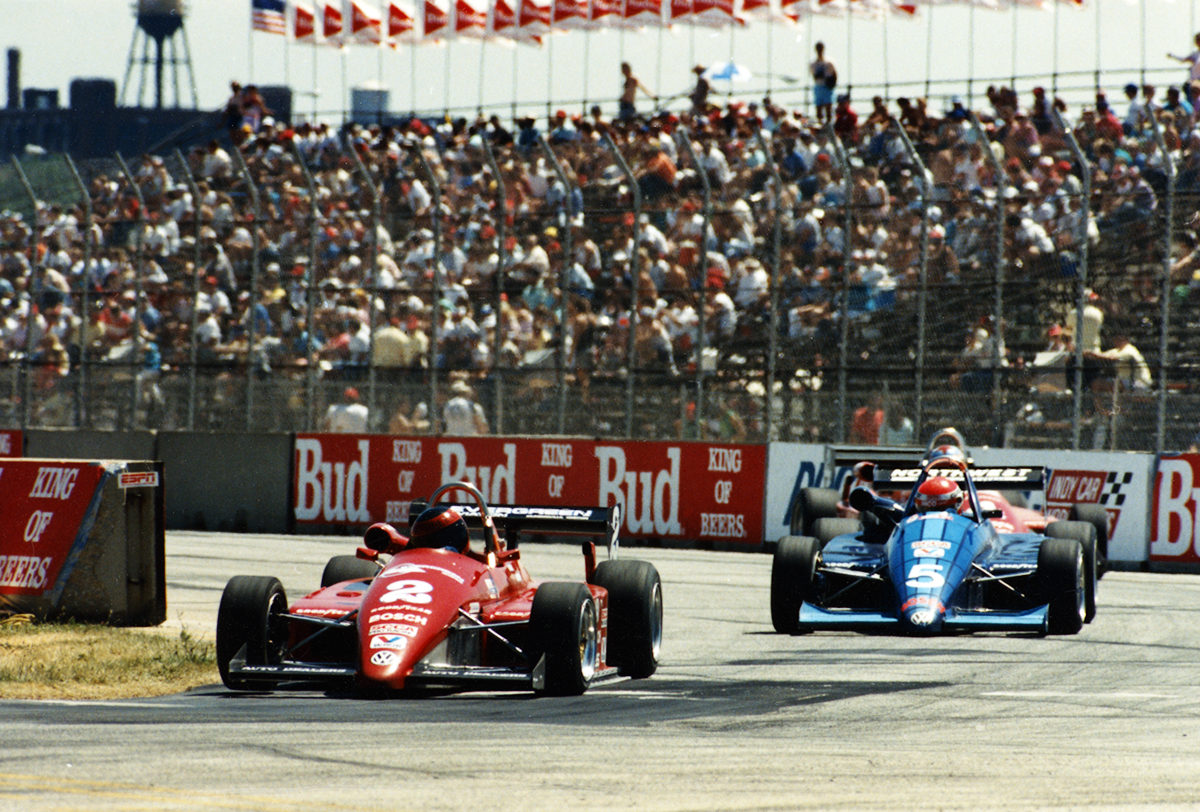
Mark Smith leading Robbie Groff in a Super Vee race at the 1988 Grand Prix of Cleveland.

Much later, engine regulations were also opened up, allowing fuel injected water-cooled engines from the Volkswagen Golf (or Rabbit as the Mk1 was known in North America). The water-cooled engines inevitably replaced the air-cooled, which were rendered uncompetitive, and many air-cooled cars were converted to accept the water-cooled engine. Some constructors, such as Lola, offered "conversion kits" which allowed the fitment of the Golf/Rabbit engine to earlier air-cooled chassis. The SCCA in the USA did allow 1700cc air-cooled engines towards the end of the air-cooled period, to remain competitive while the water-cooled cars joined the grid.

Ultimately the most developed version of Super Vee was to be found in the US, since they continued with a Super Vee series years after the formula had died away elsewhere. Indeed, by late 70s Super Vee in the USA had become the feeder formula for Indy cars, referred to as the "Mini-Indy" series. This series was run in conjunction with the much older VW-Bosch "Gold Cup" for Super V. This series lasted until 1990 and, unlike the oval track USAC Mini Indy Series, was a road racing series. Each series crowned its own champion each year. In the late 70s the Ron Tauranac designed the Ralt RT1 and RT5, based on his Formula 3 designs, had a virtual monopoly in the USA series.

== The original Formula Super Vee series specifications ==
- Engine: Type 3 1600cc (actually a stroke of 69 mm and a bore of 85.5 mm for a displacement of 1582cc). Dry sump not allowed.
- Cooling: air, with external oil coolers and oil filters.
- Carburetion: free, however most used Weber 48 IDA or Solex 40P11 dual downdraft. Some use of Weber IDF and DCNF. (Note: two dual down draft carbs allowed, any manufacturer with dual port VW or aftermarket intake manifolds).
- Transmission: stock VW from the 1969 Square back/fastback series. However, gear ratios were open and almost immediately Webster and Hewland gear sets were adopted for the VW transaxle.
- Ignition: coil and distributor.
- Clutch: VW stock, with Hydraulic linkage.
- Brakes: Girling hydraulic with VW discs front, VW Drums in the rear.
- Wheels: 6" X 13" front and rear. Magnesium allowed.
- Tires: 5:00/8:30 X 13 front, Treaded (no slicks) 5:50/9/20 X 13 rear, Treaded (no slicks)
- Steering: Rack and Pinion
- Suspension: free, front and rear
- Shocks: free, front and rear
- Sway bars: free, front and rear
- Rear uprights: free (and usually proprietary by car manufacturer)
- Curb Weight: Dry, without driver, 825 lbs minimum.
- Wheelbase: free (most manufacturers were between 88" and 94")
- Track, Front/Rear: Up to 92"
- Fuel Tank Capacity: Free, but most manufacturers located the tank under and behind the driver but in front of the firewall, which pretty much limited the capacity to 6.0 gallons.
- Construction: tubular space frame, flat bottom, no wings or tabs to induce downforce.
- Body: any material, but full coverage (including engine compartment) required.

== Champions ==
=== SCCA Super Vee Gold Cup (professional) (USA) ===
Season	Champion Driver	Chassis
1971	(United States) Bill Scott	Royale RP9
1972	(United States) Bill Scott	Royale RP14
1973	(Sweden) Bertil Roos	Tui BH3
1974	(United States) Elliott Forbes-Robinson	Lola T320
1975	(United States) Eddie Miller	Lola T324
1976	(United States) Tom Bagley	Zink Z11
1977	(United States) Bob Lazier	Lola T324
1978	(United States) Bill Alsup	Argo JM2
1979	(Australia) Geoff Brabham	Ralt RT1
1980	(United States) Peter Kuhn	Ralt RT1/RT5
1981	(United States) Al Unser Jr.	Ralt RT5
1982	(United States) Michael Andretti	Ralt RT5
1983	(United States) Ed Pimm	Anson SA4
1984	(Netherlands) Arie Luyendyk	Ralt RT5
1985	(United States) Ken Johnson	Ralt RT5
1986	(Belgium) Didier Theys	Martini MK-47/MK-50
1987	(United States) Scott Atchison	Ralt RT5
1988	(United States) Ken Murillo	Ralt RT5
1989	(United States) Mark Smith	Ralt RT5
1990	(United States) Stuart Crow	Ralt RT5

=== USAC Mini-Indy Series (professional) (USA) ===
Season	Champion Driver	Chassis
1977^{1}	(United States) Tom Bagley	Zink Z11
1977^{1}	(United States) Herm Johnson	Lola T324
1978	(United States) Bill Alsup	Argo JM2
1979	(Australia) Dennis Firestone	March
1980	(United States) Peter Kuhn	Ralt RT1/RT5

^{1}Bagley and Johnson tied in the points and were declared co-champions.

=== Formel Super Vau GTX (Germany)/German Formula Super Vee Championship ===
Season	Champion Driver	Chassis
1972	(Liechtenstein) Manfred Schurti	Royale RP9
1973	(Sweden) Kennerth Persson	Kaimann
1974	(Sweden) Kennerth Persson	Kaimann
1975	(Finland) Keke Rosberg	Kern-Kaimann
1976	(Finland) Mika Arpiainen	Veemax Mk VIII
1977	(Germany) Dieter Engel	Veemax Mk VIII
1978	(Germany) Helmut Henzler	March 783

=== Formula Super Vau Gold Pokal (Europe)/European Formula Super Vee Championship ===
Season	Champion Driver	Chassis
1971	(Austria) Erich Breinberg	Austro Kaimann
1972	(Liechtenstein) Manfred Schurti	Royale RP9
1973	(Austria) Helmut Koinigg	Austro Kaimann
1974	(Sweden) Freddy Kottulinsky	Lola T320
1975	(Finland) Mikko Kozarowitzky	Lola T324
1976	(Finland) Mika Arpiainen	Veemax Mk VII
1977	(Netherlands) Arie Luyendyk	Lola T326
1978	(Germany) Helmut Henzler	March 783
1979	(Denmark) John Nielsen	Ralt RT1
1980	(Denmark) John Nielsen	Ralt RT5
1981	(Denmark) John Nielsen	Ralt RT5
1982	(Austria) Walter Lechner	Ralt RT5
