= Royale Racing =

British racecar construction company

- Industry: Automotive
- Predecessor: Racing Preparations
- Founded: 1968
- Founder: Bob King
- Defunct: 1987
- Successor: Royale Racing llc
- Headquarters: Great Britain
- Key people: Rory Byrne; Pat Symonds
- Owner: Bob King (1968–1976); Alan Cornock (1976–1987)
- Website: www.royaleracingllc.com

Royale Race Cars was a British constructor of race cars in the 20th century. The company produced single seaters as well as sports cars.

== History ==
=== Late 1960s ===
Bob King had experience with the working on and selling of automobiles. When King acquired an Elva he had the intention to race the car himself. This evolved into preparing race cars for others. He founded Racing Preparations, specializing in Coventry Climax engines. After the demand for Climax engines decreased King and business partner Alan Cornock decided to focus on constructing race cars. In 1968 King founded Royale, named after the Park Royal area in London. The first car was the RP1, RP for Racing Preparations. The car was designed by Bob Marston, a future designer for Lola Cars. The RP2 was the first production Royale of which 30 were built.

=== 1970s ===
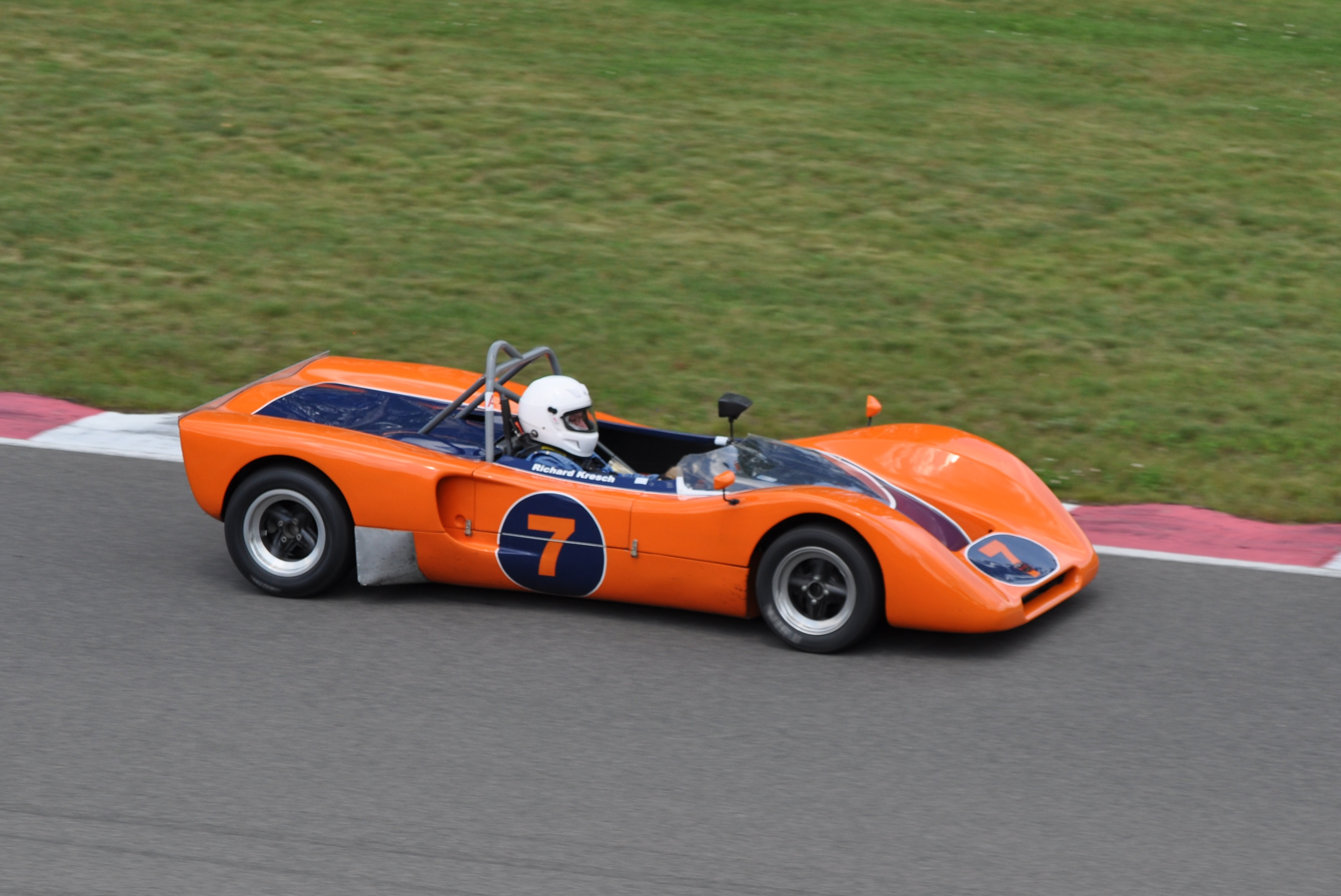
Royale RP4

The RP2 had some success in the Brazilian Formula Ford championship. Ray Allen achieved a third place in the championship behind Emerson Fittipaldi and Ian Ashley both driving Lotuses. Royale introduced many new cars in 1970. Ray Allen dominated the newly found Formula F100 in a Royale RP4. Two Formula Atlantic RP8's were built. Chassis number 1 was driven by Ray Allen and Tony Lanfranchi in various Formula Libre races. At the end of the year the car was shipped of to America. The second chassis sold as a Formula 3 car to a German agent.

In 1971 Royale had a lot of success in the Formula Super Vee. Syd Williams, fielded by D.J. Bond Racing, won the first race of the German championship. Manfred Schurti and Manfred Trint scored a one-two finish for Royale during the final round of the championship. In the American championship Royale had even more success. Billy Scott won the championship winning four races. Royales were also driven by Ray Heppenstall among others. Tom Pryce debuted the RP11 during round 17 of the BRSCC British F3 championship. The Ford engined car did not finish the race after an accident. Val Musetti raced an RP11 at the Christmas Championship Trophy. The following year Pryce won the opening round of the BRSCC British F3. Ian Ashley scored a third-place finish in the opening round of the BRSCC North Central British F3. In Formula Super Vee, Manfred Schurti won four races and was placed first in the German championship. Scott won the American championship again in 1972 driving a Royale. Paul Dalton drove an RP5 in the SCCA Continental Championship for Formula B/C. But without major results. In the British Formula Atlantic championship Tom Pryce and Ray Allen drove a Royale RP12. The car received some good results. Pryce won one race and scored another podium finish. Ray Allen scored two podium finishes at Brands Hatch and Oulton Park. Royale also scored its first win at the prestigious SCCA National Championship Runoffs. William Holbrook won the C Sports Racer class in an RP4.

1973 was again highly successful for Royale in Formula Super Vee. Harry Ingle and Bob Lazier won races for the British marque. Lazier finished third in the championship behind Harry Ingle. Bertil Roos won the championship in a Tui. Former Formula Super Vee champion Manfred Schurti raced a Royale in various Formula 2 races. Schurti struggled to qualify. The only race he qualified Schurti did not finish due to a camshaft failure. The best result in Formula 3 came at Thruxton with Andy Sutcliffe. In the opening round of the BARC F3 championship Sutcliffe scored a second-place finish.

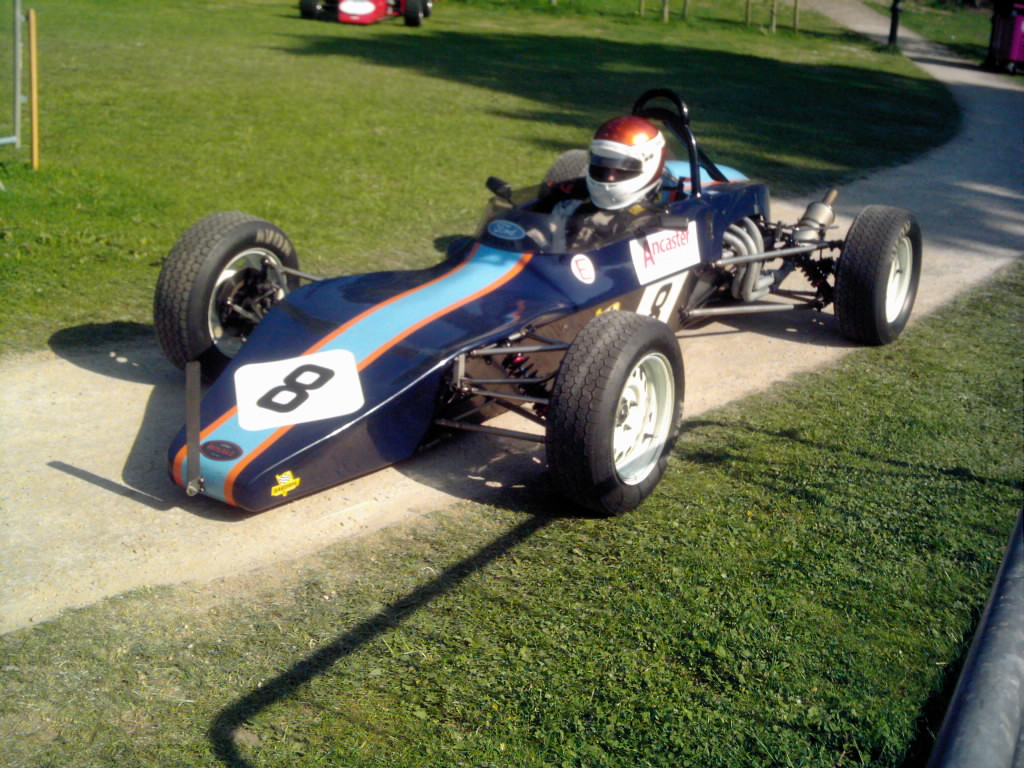
Royale RP21 (1975) at Crystal Palace circuit, sprint meeting, 2012

The following year Royale was again very competitive in Formula Super Vee. Tom Bagley scored two wins in the American championship. Bagley, Walter Wilkins, Richard Melville and Billy Scott all scored podium finishes racing Royales. Bagley finished third in the championship. In Europe the marque had less success. Ruedi Caprez and Baron de St. Hubert scored podium finishes. 1975 marked the year Royale built its last Formula Super Vee cars. Rory Byrne joined the design team and designed the RP19. Bobby Rahal was the only Royale driver to score podium finished. Rahal finished second at Mosport Park and third at Watkins Glen. Geoff Lees, driving a Royale RP21, won the 1975 Formula Ford Festival. This was the last Festival to be driven at the Snetterton Motor Racing Circuit. South African driver Rad Dougall finished third also driving a Royale. Lees also won the BRDC and BRSCC Formula Ford championships. With the demise of Formula Super Vee Royale began to focus on Formula Ford 2000. Rory Byrne built a prototype and in 1977 production began on the RP25. In 1976 Rory Byrne designed Royales last Formula 3 car. Byrne designed and built the chassis and suspension. But before the car was finished the project was sold to Roger Andreason and Paul Fox who completed the bodywork. The car was renamed Druid 377. Due to the lack of ground effect the car was not competitive in Formula 3 and was rebuilt as a Formula Atlantic car for the 1979 season. With driver Roger White the car had some top ten finishes. A further two chassis were built. Meanwhile, in Formula Ford Jim Walsh won the 1976 BRDC championship. In 1977 Royale made its debut in Formula Ford 2000. Rad Dougall had a very good season as he won the BARC championship and the MCD championship. He won a total of 14 races. Fellow Royale driver Kenny Gray won another three races. A Royale car also won the BARC Formula Ford 1600 championship. David Leslie won nine races and secured the championship. Kenny Acheson won the championship the following year driving a Royale.

=== 1980s ===
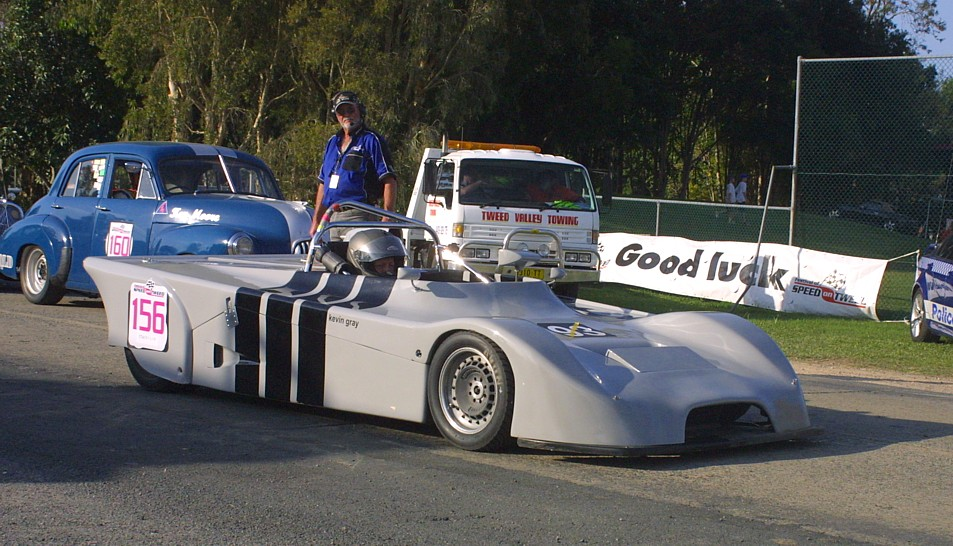
Royale RP37

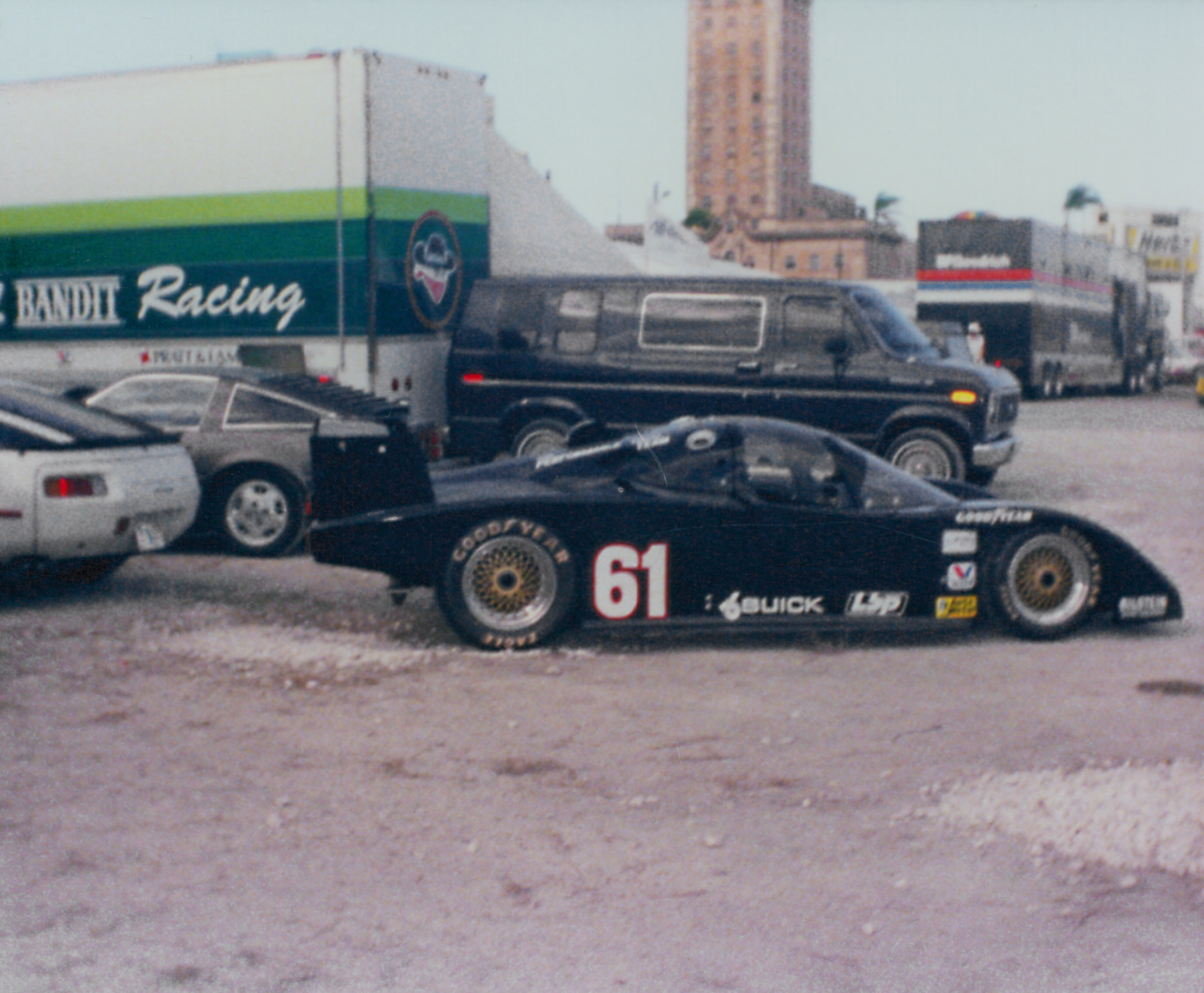
1987 Royale RP40

Royale was one of the few constructors to design a new car for the Formula Talbot series along with Sparton. Most entries were redesigned Formula Ford 2000 cars. The cars used a Talbot Sunbeam 1.6 litre engine that ran on methanol fuel. The series folded in 1982 after three seasons. Pat Symonds designed the Formula Talbot, Formula Ford 1600 and Formula Ford 2000 cars built by Royale in 1980. The marque dominated the British Formula Ford 2000 championship. Royale RP27's won all races in the BARC championship. Richard Trott won the championship. Trott also won the MCD Formula Ford 2000 championship. In Formula Ford 1600 Royale won three races in the BARC championship with Jonathan Palmer, Rob Tennant and Rick Morris. The following year was less successful for Royale. The RP29 and RP30 were race winners in their championships but could not secure championship titles. In Formula Ford 1600 David Wheeler was the most successful Royale driver winning two races in a Van Diemen dominated season. Van Diemen also dominated the Formula Ford 2000 championship. Royale achieved five wins with Tim Davies and two wins with Mike Taylor. In 1982 Mike Taylor entered a Royale S2000M, Royales first Sports 2000 car, in the British Sports 2000 Championship. The British driver won three races. Jeremy Rossiter and David Sutherland also won races in the championship driving Royales. The Thundersports championship was launched in 1983. Royale S2000M cars were eligible in this Formula Libre style sports car championship. Royale achieved three podium finishes. The S2000M also won races in the British S2000 championship with David Sutherland. Keith Fine won the only race for Royale in the British Formula Ford 1600. Bob Marston designed a new S2000 car for 1984. The car achieved a second place at Brands Hatch in the Thundersports championship. In the British S2000 championship James Thompson won four races. Thompson secured the championship finishing in front of Sean Walker both driving Royales. 1984 was also the year the last Formula Ford 1600 chassis were built by Royale. The Royale RP36, of which 14 were built, could not achieve significant results. The following year the last Formula Ford 2000 chassis were built. But with Reynard and Van Diemen dominating the market, Royale could not win any races. In S2000 Royale had stiff competition from Shrike and Tiga. Ian Flux won round 14 at Thruxton. Bob Marston designed a new S2000 car, the RP42. Mike Taylor finished second in the championship winning six races. Taylor went on to win the following season in a RP42. The British driver also scored podium finishes in the Thundersports championship in 1986 and 1987. Royale made its first Group C car in 1985. The Royale RP40 would be rebadged as the Argo JM16 after Royale ceased to produce racing cars. The car would achieve a ninth place in its inaugural race, the 1984 24 Hours of Daytona. Lyn St. James and Howdy Holmes achieved a third-place finish in the Watkins Glen 500 Kilometres. Ernesto Soto, Mandy Gonzalez and Diego Montoya achieved a second place finish at the 1986 24 hours of Daytona in a Porsche powered RP40 in the GTP Lights class.

== Racing cars ==
| Year | Model | Racing series | Nr. built | Designer | Note |
|---|---|---|---|---|---|
| 1968 | Royale RP1 | Formula Ford | 1 | Bob Marston | Prototype |
| 1969 | Royale RP2 | Formula Ford | 50 | Bob Marston | |
| 1970 | Royale RP3 | Formula Ford | 12 | Bob Marston | |
| 1970 | Royale RP4 | Formula F100 | 6 | Bob Marston | |
| 1970 | Royale RP4 | C Sports Racer | 5 | Bob Marston | |
| 1970 | Royale RP6 | C Sports Racer | 9 | Bob Marston | |
| 1970 | Royale RP7 | Formula 5000 | 0 | | None built |
| 1970 | Royale RP8 | Formula Atlantic | 2 | Bob Marston | |
| 1970 | Royale RP9 | Formula Super Vee | 26 | Mike Smith, Peter Bohanna | |
| 1970 | Royale RP10 | Group 6 | 2 | Bob Marston | |
| 1971 | Royale RP3a | Formula Ford | 20 | Bob Marston | |
| 1971 | Royale RP4a | Formula F100 | 4 | Bob Marston | |
| 1971 | Royale RP4a | C Sports Racer | 4 | Bob Marston | |
| 1971 | Royale RP5 | Formula B | 1 | Bob Marston | |
| 1971 | Royale RP11 | Formula 3 | 8 | Mike Smith, Peter Bohanna | |
| 1971 | Royale RP12 | Formula 5000 | 1 | Mike Smith, Peter Bohanna | Car was destroyed in a fire |
| 1971 | Royale RP14 | Formula Super Vee | 20 | Mike Smith, Peter Bohanna | |
| 1972 | Royale RP15 | Formula 2 | 1 | Mike Smith, Peter Bohanna | Updated version of the RP14 |
| 1972 | Royale RP16 | Formula Ford | 60 | Bob King | Updated RP3 with RP14 bodywork |
| 1972 | Royale RP17 | Group 6 | 9 | Bob Marston | |
| 1973 | Royale RP11a | Formula 3 | 1 | Mike Smith, Peter Bohanna | |
| 1973 | Royale RP18 | Formula Super Vee | 11 | Mike Smith, Peter Bohanna | |
| 1973 | Royale RP20 | Formula 2 | 1 | Dave Beacon | |
| 1974 | Royale RP16a | Formula Ford | 9 | Bob King | |
| 1974 | Royale RP18a | Formula Super Vee | 11 | Mike Smith, Peter Bohanna | |
| 1975 | Royale RP19 | Formula Super Vee | 10 | Rory Byrne | |
| 1975 | Royale RP21 | Formula Ford | 67 | Mike Smith, Peter Bohanna | |
| 1975 | Royale RP22 | Formula Ford 2000 | 1 | Rory Byrne | Prototype |
| 1976 | Royale RP23 | Formula 3 | 3 | Rory Byrne | Came to market as the Druid 377 |
| 1977 | Royale RP24 | Formula Ford | 89 | Rory Byrne | |
| 1977 | Royale RP25 | Formula Ford 2000 | 4 | Rory Byrne | |
| 1979 | Royale RP26 | Formula Ford | 104 | Pat Symonds | |
| 1980 | Royale RP27 | Formula Ford 2000 | 20 | Pat Symonds | |
| 1980 | Royale RP28 | Formula Talbot | 1 | Pat Symonds | Derivative of the RP26 |
| 1980 | Royale RP30 | Formula Ford 2000 | 17 | Pat Symonds | |
| 1981 | Royale RP29 | Formula Ford | 32 | Pat Symonds | |
| 1981 | Royale S2000M | Sports 2000 | 25 | Bob Marston | |
| 1983 | Royale RP31M | Formula Ford | 39 | Bob Marston | |
| 1983 | Royale RP33M | Formula Ford | 25 | Bob Marston | |
| 1983 | Royale RP34M | Formula Ford 2000 | 1 | Bob Marston | Scrapped after first race |
| 1984 | Royale RP32M | Formula Ford 2000 | 6 | Bob Marston | |
| 1984 | Royale RP35M | Formula Ford 2000 | 0 | Wiet Huidekoper | None built |
| 1984 | Royale RP36 | Formula Ford | 14 | Wiet Huidekoper | Updated RP33 |
| 1984 | Royale RP37 | Sports 2000 | 17 | Bob Marston | |
| 1985 | Royale RP38 | Sports 2000 | 8 | | |
| 1985 | Royale RP39 | Formula Ford 2000 | 11 | | Rebadged as an Argo JM14 |
| 1985 | Royale RP40 | Group C | 1 | Nigel Stroud | Rebadged as an Argo JM16 |
| 1985 | Royale RP41 | Can-Am | 0 | | None built |
| 1985 | Royale RP42 | Sports 2000 | 8 | Bob Marston | |

== Royale Racing LLC ==
In 2008, Christopher Shoemaker purchased the rights to the company's trademarks and founded Royale Racing LLC, which repairs, maintains and rents vintage Royale machines. It does not produce original vehicles.
