= Bob Lazier =

American race car driver (1938–2020)

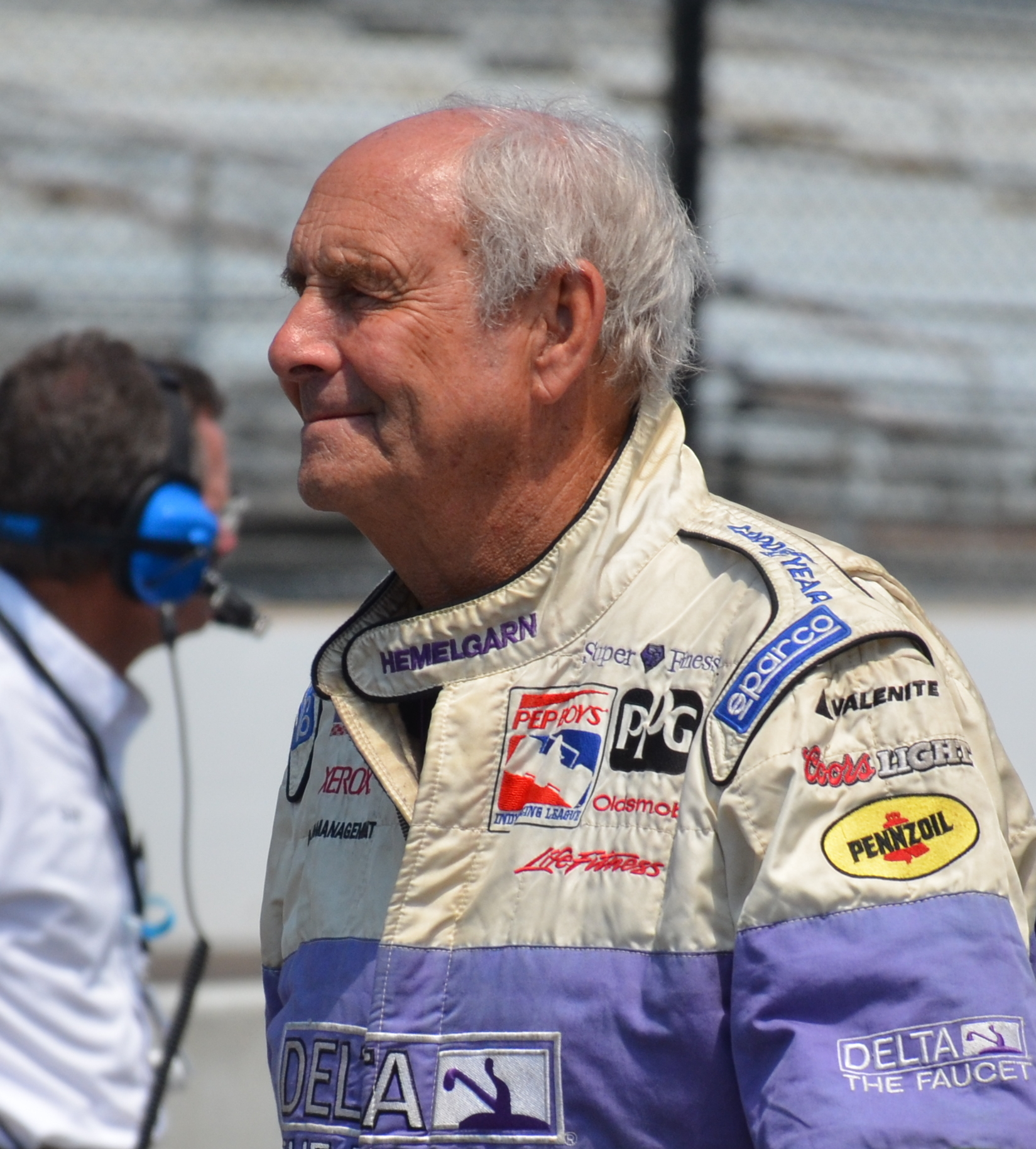
- Lazier at the 2018 SVRA Brickyard Vintage Invitational Pro-Am race
- Born: Robert Lazier; December 22, 1938; Minneapolis, Minnesota, U.S.
- Died: April 18, 2020 (aged 81); Denver, Colorado, U.S

Champ Car career
- 11 races run over 1 year
- Years active: 1981
- Best finish: 9th – 1981
- First race: 1981 Kraco Car Stereo 150 (Phoenix International Raceway)
- Last race: 1981 Miller High Life 150 (Phoenix International Raceway)
Wins	Podiums	Poles
0	0	0

Robert Lazier (December 22, 1938 – April 18, 2020) was an American race car driver.

== Biography ==
A native of Minneapolis, Minnesota, Lazier raced in the CART series in 1981 and was CART's Rookie of the Year. He had fourth-place finishes at Watkins Glen International and Mexico. Lazier also competed in the 1981 Indianapolis 500, finishing 19th after a blown engine caused him to retire the Penske PC-7 after 154 laps. He was married to wife Diane and was the father of both 1996 Indianapolis 500 winner Buddy Lazier and Indy Racing League driver Jaques Lazier, and grandfather of current Indy Lights driver Flinn Lazier

Lazier competed in Formula 5000 in the 1970s. In 2015, Lazier won the Indy Legends Charity Pro–Am race with co-driver Jim Caudle.

Lazier built the Tivoli Lodge in Vail, Colorado, in 1968.

Lazier died on April 18, 2020, in Denver, Colorado, from COVID-19 during the COVID-19 pandemic in Colorado. He was 81.

== Racing record ==
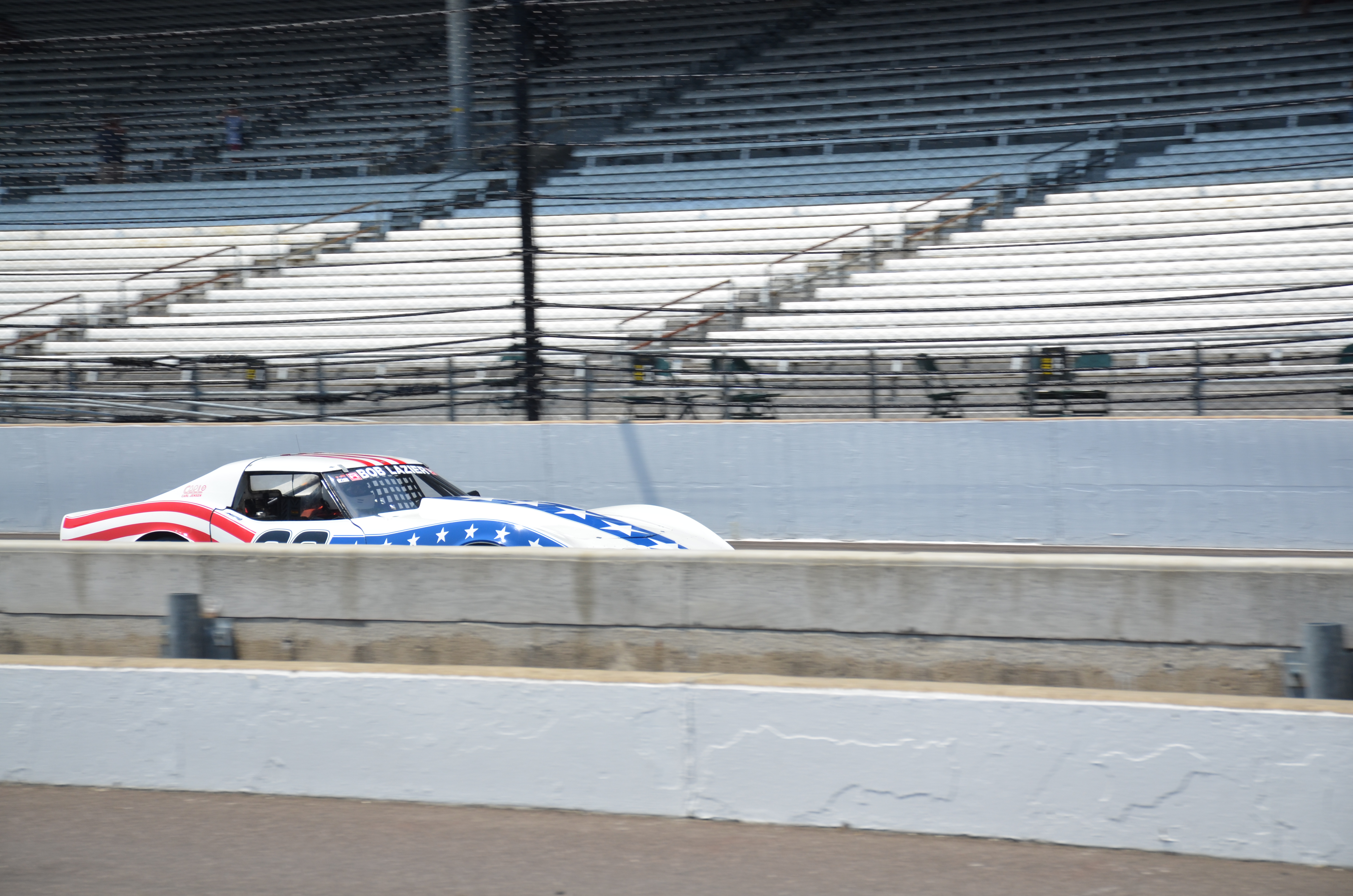
Bob Lazier at the 2018 SVRA Brickyard Vintage Invitational Pro-Am race

=== SCCA National Championship Runoffs ===
Year	Track	Car	Engine	Class	Finish	Start	Status
1970	Road Atlanta	Zink	Volkswagen	Formula Vee	8	10	Running
1970	Road Atlanta	Titan	Ford	Formula Ford	3	2	Running
1971	Road Atlanta	March 71B	Ford	Formula B	1	9	Running
1971	Road Atlanta	Zink	Volkswagen	Formula Vee	3	3	Running
1972	Road Atlanta	Zink	Volkswagen	Formula Vee	2	1	Running
1973	Road Atlanta	Zink	Volkswagen	Formula Vee	3	9	Running
1976	Road Atlanta	Zink	Volkswagen	Formula Vee	19	6	Retired
1979	Road Atlanta	Zink	Volkswagen	Formula Vee	12	23	Running

=== American Open Wheel racing results ===
(key)

=== Formula Super Vee ===
Year	Team	Chassis	Engine	1	2	3	4	5	6	7	8	9	10	Rank	Points
1977		Lola 324	VW Brabham	SIR; 1	NLG; 1	WG1; 1	ROA; 1	HAL; 15	MOH; 1	BRN; 17	CMT; 1	WG2; 3	MOS; 1	1st	132

=== Complete USAC Mini-Indy Series results ===
Year	Entrant	1	2	3	4	5	6	Pos	Points
1977		TRE	MIL	MOS	PIR; 7			19th	60
1980		MIL	POC	MOH; 2	MIN1	MIN2	ONT	13th	160

==== CART ====
Year	Team	Chassis	Engine	1	2	3	4	5	6	7	8	9	10	11	Rank	Points	Ref
1981	Fletcher Racing	Penske PC-7	Ford Cosworth DFX V8 (t/c)	PHX; 12	MIL; 13	ATL1; 17	ATL2; 9	MIS; Ret	RIV; 5		MIS2; 13	WGL; 4			9th	92	
1981	Fletcher Racing	March 81C	Ford Cosworth DFX V8 (t/c)							MIL2; Ret			MEX; 4	PHX2; 13	9th	92	

==== Indianapolis 500 ====
Year	Chassis	Engine	Start	Finish	Entrant
1981	Penske PC-7	Cosworth DFX V8 (t/c)	13	19	Fletcher Racing
1982	March 82C	Cosworth DFX V8 (t/c)	DNQ		Wysard Racing

Sporting positions
Preceded by Tom Bagley	US Formula Super Vee; Champion; 1977	Succeeded by Bill Alsup
Preceded by Dennis Firestone	CART Rookie of the Year; 1981	Succeeded by Bobby Rahal
