= Zink Cars =

- Type: Corporation
- Industry: Automotive
- Founded: 1962
- Founder: Ed Zink
- Headquarters: Knoxville, Tennessee

Zink Cars is a former constructor of Formula Vee cars among other racing cars. Zink Cars was formed in 1962, as of 1974 all manufacturing of the Zink racing cars was taken over by Citation Engineering.

== History ==
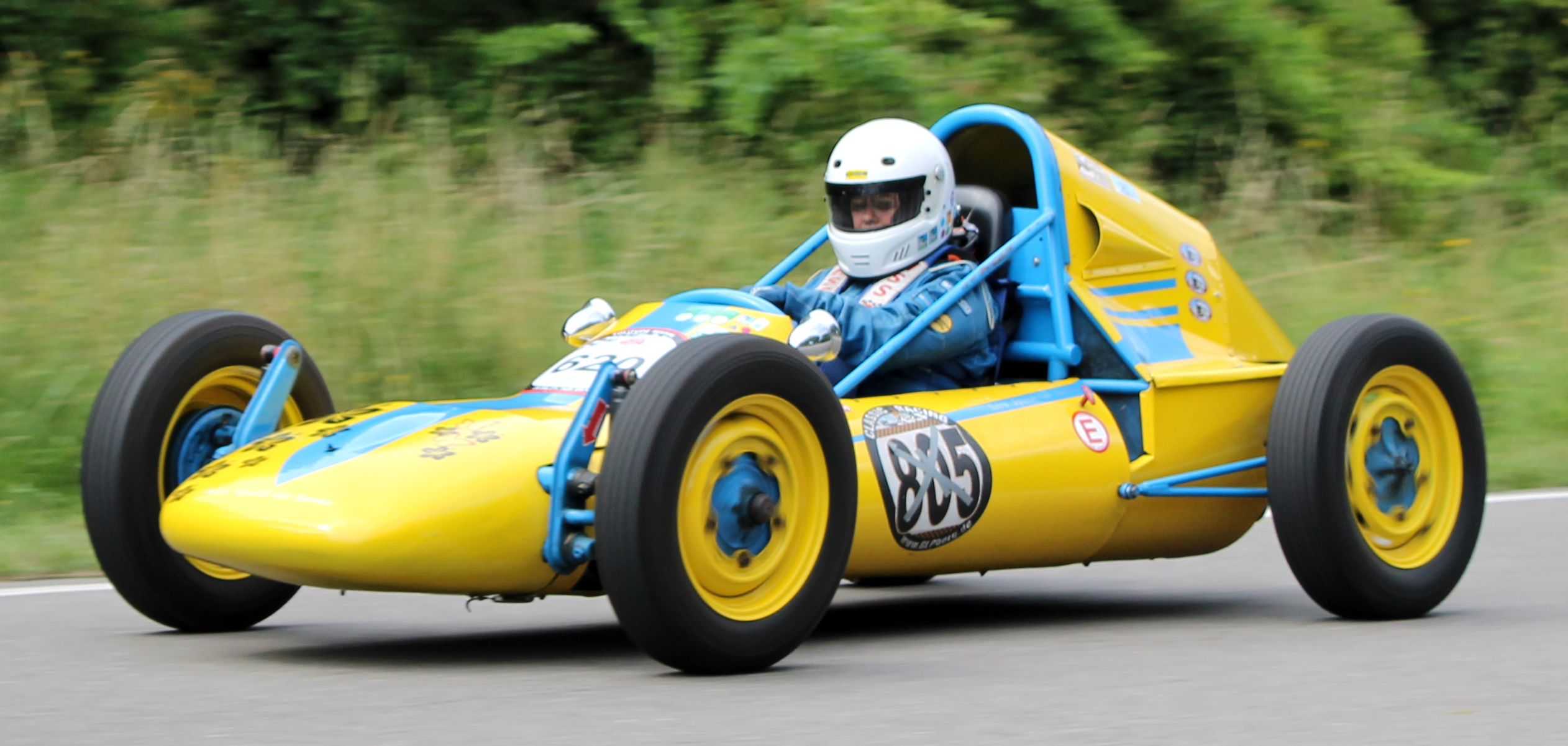
Zink Formula Vee car photographed in 2019.

Ed Zink started his auto racing career at the dirt ovals of Tennessee and North Carolina in the 1950s. In 1962, Zink designed and built his first road racing car, the Zink Petit. The Zink Petit was a racing car built according to SCCA H-Modified class. The car was powered by a 850 cc (52 cu in) DKW engine. The car made its debut at the SCCA National Championship Runoffs in 1960. Tommy van Hoosier failed to finish at Daytona International Raceway. Bill Greer won the most prestigious SCCA race in the H-Modified class in 1963.

After a short stint in sportscars with the Zink Z-4 the Tennessee constructor introduced the Zink Z-5 Formula Vee. The car was introduced in 1965 and was dominant in its class until 1970. The Z-5 won the Formula Vee race at the Runoffs for five years in a row. In 1967 the Zink Z-5s finished in the first five places. As a measure to counter Zink's dominance the SCCA outlawed stressed-skin metalwork in 1967. Zink's dominance was broken in 1971 with Lynx winning the Runoffs.

Zink also joined the Formula Super Vee market. With steep competition from Royale, Lola and Zeitler, John Finger was the best driver in a Zink in the 1971 US Formula Super Vee championship. Finger scored one podium finish and ended in fifth place in the championship. Harry Ingle finished second in the same championship the following year. Ingle won the 1973 Formula Super Vee Runoffs. It proved to be the only Formula Super Vee Runoffs win for Zink. Tom Bagley was successful in the Zink Z-11, winning three races in the US Formula Super Vee championship. Bagley was second in 1975 and won the championship in 1976. Later Formula Super Vee cars were less successful.

Zink also competed in the highly popular Formula Ford category. Bruce MacInnes won two consecutive Runoffs pole positions in 1975 and 1976. MacInnes finished second in 1975 and suffered a penalty in 1976 preventing his win. Dave Weitzenhof won the Runoffs in the Formula Ford class in 1977 finishing in front of David Loring and Dennis Firestone driving a Zink Z-10. The Z-10 was the first car designed by Zink but manufactured by Citation Engineering. Weitzenhof also ran the Zink Z-16 Formula Ford winning the Runoffs in 1981.

Zink entered Formula 440 with the series inception in 1984. The Zink Z19 was highly successful in Formula 440 winning the Runoffs in 1984, 1986, 1987 and 1996.

Ed Zink died in 2003.

== Racing cars ==
| Year | Car | Engine | Class |
|---|---|---|---|
| 1960 | Zink Petite MK I | DKW | SCCA H-Modified |
| 1962 | Zink Petit MK II | DKW | SCCA H-Modified National Championship Winner |
| 1964 | Zink Z-4 | DKW or Coventry-Climax | Sports racer |
| 1965 | Zink Z-5 | Volkswagen | Formula Vee |
| 1968 | Zink Z-8 | Volkswagen | Vee Sports Racing |
| 1969 | Zink Z-9 | Volkswagen | Formula Super Vee |
| 1974 | Zink Z-10 | Ford | Formula Ford |
| 1974 | Zink Z-11 | Volkswagen | Formula Super Vee |
| 1976 | Zink Z-12 | Volkswagen | Formula Vee |
| 1977 | Zink Z-14 | Volkswagen | Formula Super Vee |
| 1978 | Zink Z-16 | Ford | Formula Ford |
| 1980 | Zink Z-18 | Volkswagen | Formula Vee |
| 1984 | Zink Z-19 | Kawasaki | Formula 500 |
