= 2026 USF Juniors =

Racing season

The 2026 USF Juniors presented by Continental Tire was the fifth season of the USF Juniors. The championship serves as the fourth rung of the IndyCar Series' USF Pro Championships ladder system.

== Drivers and teams ==
All drivers competed using Tatuus JR-23 racecars with Elite Mazda 2.0-014A engines and Continental tires.

Team	No.	Driver(s)	Status	Round(s)
(Canada) Berg Racing	68	(Canada) Alex Berg	R	1–9
(United States) DEForce Racing	14	(Finland) Vilho Aatola		1–9
(United States) DEForce Racing	14	(Mexico) Juan Garciarce	R	14–16
(United States) DEForce Racing	18	(United States) Jack Haydu	R	10–11
(United States) DEForce Racing	19	(Mexico) Elías Vignola	R	All
(United States) DEForce Racing	20	(Colombia) Pipe Chaparro	R	1–6, 10–16
(United States) Exclusive Autosport	90	(United States) Bex Cranston	R	All
(United States) Exclusive Autosport	91	(United States) Connor Aspley		1–9
(United States) Exclusive Autosport	92	(United States) Brenden Cooley		1–13
(United States) Exclusive Autosport	97	(Canada) Cole Medeiros	R	All
(United States) JHDD powered by ECR	6	(Denmark) Casper Nissen	R	1–13
(United States) JHDD powered by ECR	7	(United States) Aryan Narola	R	All
(United States) JHDD powered by ECR	8	(United Kingdom) Max Cuthbert	R	1–13
(United States) JHDD powered by ECR	8	(United States) Indy Andersen	R	14–16
(United States) JHDD powered by ECR	9	(United States) John Main	R	All
(United States) Olivia Racing	25	(Poland) Karol Pasiewicz	R	All
(United States) Savage Auto Sport	3	(United States) Alexander Savage	R	14–16
(United States) VRD Racing by Pole Position	10	(Spain) Iván Machado Pérez	R	1–9
(United States) VRD Racing by Pole Position	12	(Netherlands) Dean Hoogendoorn	R	7–16
(United States) VRD Racing by Pole Position	27	(France) Arthur Barbe	R	4–6
(United States) VRD Racing by Pole Position	30	(Canada) Edward Kennedy	R	7–16
(United States) Zanella Racing	21	(United States) Jared Oselka	R	All
(United States) Zanella Racing	23	(Canada) Olivier Mrak	R	All
(United States) Zanella Racing	28	(United States) Grant Mitchell	R	All
(United States) Zanella Racing	29	(United States) Maddie Colleran		1–6, 10–16
(United States) Zanella Racing	46	(Lebanon) Max Mokarem	R	All
(United States) Zanella Racing	69	(Panama) Gianmatteo Rousseau	R	14–16
(United States) Zanella Racing	87	(Canada) Leonardo Serravalle	R	All
(United States) Zanella Racing	88	(Brazil) Victor Couto	R	All

Icon	Status
R	Rookie

== Schedule ==
The 2026 schedule was revealed on October 25, 2025. In contrast with the higher rungs of the USF Pro Championships, only the Mid-Ohio round will run in support of the IndyCar Series, with the rounds at Barber and Portland being discontinued. Instead, new rounds at Mosport and Lime Rock will be run in support of the NASCAR Canada Series and the NASCAR Craftsman Truck Series, respectively, as well as a first-time visit to Carolina Motorsports Park. The season opener at NOLA Motorsports Park was replaced by another standalone round at the Homestead–Miami Speedway road course, while the standalone round at Road America was moved to the season finale slot.

Icon	Legend
R	Road course

Rd.	Date	Race name	Track	Location
1	February 17–18	Grand Prix of Homestead presented by YACademy	R Homestead–Miami Speedway (Modified Road Course)	Homestead, Florida
2	February 17–18	Grand Prix of Homestead presented by YACademy	R Homestead–Miami Speedway (Modified Road Course)	Homestead, Florida
3	February 17–18	Grand Prix of Homestead presented by YACademy	R Homestead–Miami Speedway (Modified Road Course)	Homestead, Florida
4	April 17–19	Continental Tire Grand Prix of South Carolina	R Carolina Motorsports Park	Kershaw, South Carolina
5	April 17–19	Continental Tire Grand Prix of South Carolina	R Carolina Motorsports Park	Kershaw, South Carolina
6	April 17–19	Continental Tire Grand Prix of South Carolina	R Carolina Motorsports Park	Kershaw, South Carolina
7	May 14–17	Continental Tire Grand Prix of Canada	R Canadian Tire Motorsport Park	Clarington, Ontario
8	May 14–17	Continental Tire Grand Prix of Canada	R Canadian Tire Motorsport Park	Clarington, Ontario
9	May 14–17	Continental Tire Grand Prix of Canada	R Canadian Tire Motorsport Park	Clarington, Ontario
10	July 3–4	USF Pro Patriot 250 Grand Prix of Mid-Ohio	R Mid-Ohio Sports Car Course	Lexington, Ohio
11	July 3–4	USF Pro Patriot 250 Grand Prix of Mid-Ohio	R Mid-Ohio Sports Car Course	Lexington, Ohio
12	July 10–11	Andersen Corporate Woodworking Grand Prix of Lime Rock	R Lime Rock Park	Lakeville, Connecticut
13	July 10–11	Andersen Corporate Woodworking Grand Prix of Lime Rock	R Lime Rock Park	Lakeville, Connecticut
14	September 25–26	USF Pro Championships Grand Prix of Road America	R Road America	Elkhart Lake. Wisconsin
15	September 25–26	USF Pro Championships Grand Prix of Road America	R Road America	Elkhart Lake. Wisconsin
16	September 25–26	USF Pro Championships Grand Prix of Road America	R Road America	Elkhart Lake. Wisconsin

== Race results ==
Rd.	Track	Pole position	Fastest lap	Most laps led	Race winner	
Rd.	Track	Pole position	Fastest lap	Most laps led	Driver	Team
1	Homestead–Miami Speedway (Modified Road Course)	(Lebanon) Max Mokarem	(United States) Bex Cranston	(Lebanon) Max Mokarem	(Lebanon) Max Mokarem	Zanella Racing
2	Homestead–Miami Speedway (Modified Road Course)	(Spain) Iván Machado Pérez	(Denmark) Casper Nissen	(Spain) Iván Machado Pérez	(Spain) Iván Machado Pérez	VRD Racing by Pole Position
3	Homestead–Miami Speedway (Modified Road Course)	(Spain) Iván Machado Pérez	(United Kingdom) Max Cuthbert	(Spain) Iván Machado Pérez (Lebanon) Max Mokarem	(Lebanon) Max Mokarem	Zanella Racing
4	Carolina Motorsports Park	(Spain) Iván Machado Pérez	(Spain) Iván Machado Pérez	(Canada) Cole Medeiros	(Canada) Cole Medeiros	Exclusive Autosport
5	Carolina Motorsports Park	(Spain) Iván Machado Pérez	(Spain) Iván Machado Pérez	(Spain) Iván Machado Pérez	(Spain) Iván Machado Pérez	VRD Racing by Pole Position
6	Carolina Motorsports Park	(Spain) Iván Machado Pérez	(Spain) Iván Machado Pérez	(Spain) Iván Machado Pérez	(Spain) Iván Machado Pérez	VRD Racing by Pole Position
7	Canadian Tire Motorsport Park	(Poland) Karol Pasiewicz	(Poland) Karol Pasiewicz	(Poland) Karol Pasiewicz	(Poland) Karol Pasiewicz	Olivia Racing
8	Canadian Tire Motorsport Park	(Poland) Karol Pasiewicz	(Netherlands) Dean Hoogendoorn	(Poland) Karol Pasiewicz	(Poland) Karol Pasiewicz	Olivia Racing
9	Canadian Tire Motorsport Park	(Poland) Karol Pasiewicz	(Canada) Olivier Mrak	(Poland) Karol Pasiewicz	(Poland) Karol Pasiewicz	Olivia Racing
10	Mid-Ohio Sports Car Course	(Poland) Karol Pasiewicz	(Canada) Edward Kennedy	(Canada) Edward Kennedy	(Canada) Edward Kennedy	VRD Racing by Pole Position
11	Mid-Ohio Sports Car Course	(Poland) Karol Pasiewicz	(Poland) Karol Pasiewicz	(Poland) Karol Pasiewicz	(Canada) Edward Kennedy	VRD Racing by Pole Position
12	Lime Rock Park	(Canada) Edward Kennedy	(United States) Bex Cranston	(Canada) Edward Kennedy	(Poland) Karol Pasiewicz	Olivia Racing
13	Lime Rock Park	(Canada) Edward Kennedy	(Canada) Edward Kennedy	(United States) Bex Cranston	(Canada) Edward Kennedy	VRD Racing by Pole Position
14	Road America	(Canada) Leonardo Serravalle	(Colombia) Pipe Chaparro	(Poland) Karol Pasiewicz	(United States) Bex Cranston	Exclusive Autosport
15	Road America	(Poland) Karol Pasiewicz	(Poland) Karol Pasiewicz	(Poland) Karol Pasiewicz	(Poland) Karol Pasiewicz	Olivia Racing
16	Road America	(Poland) Karol Pasiewicz	(Poland) Karol Pasiewicz	(Poland) Karol Pasiewicz	(Poland) Karol Pasiewicz	Olivia Racing

== Championship standings ==
=== Drivers' Championship ===
Scoring system

Position	1st	2nd	3rd	4th	5th	6th	7th	8th	9th	10th	11th	12th	13th	14th	15th	16th	17th	18th	19th	20th+
Points	30	25	22	19	17	15	14	13	12	11	10	9	8	7	6	5	4	3	2	1

- The driver who qualifies on pole will be awarded one additional point.
- One point will be awarded to the driver who leads the most laps in a race.
- One point will be awarded to the driver who sets the fastest lap during the race.

Pos	Driver	HOM			CAR			CTP			MOH		LRP		ROA			Points
1	(Poland) Karol Pasiewicz	2	2	2	18	20	11	1*	1*	1*	2	5*	1	3	2	1*	1*	376
2	(United States) Bex Cranston	5	6	16	6	12	19	7	5	4	13	3	2	2*	1	16	3	254
3	(Lebanon) Max Mokarem	1*	4	1*	9	8	2	18	11	10	6	11	10	9	10	14	5	239
4	(Brazil) Victor Couto	9	11	7	12	11	4	2	2	5	15	19	8	5	4	13	10	218
5	(Canada) Olivier Mrak	4	9	3	22	2	10	3	3	2	17	18	9	11	7	19	9	216
6	(Canada) Cole Medeiros	18	5	5	1*	9	3	4	8	18	8	16	12	10	5	15	14	205
7	(Canada) Edward Kennedy							10	4	6	1*	1	3*	1	3	18	8	201
8	(Canada) Leonardo Serravalle	8	8	18	10	5	7	5	6	16	12	12	6	6	14	3	7	198
9	(Netherlands) Dean Hoogendoorn							8	9	7	3	2	4	12	12	2	4	168
10	(Spain) Iván Machado Pérez	19	1*	14*	3	1*	1*	20	10	3								167
11	(United Kingdom) Max Cuthbert	10	19	4	5	19	13	6	12	11	4	20	5	4				150
12	(Denmark) Casper Nissen	7	10	6	4	6	18	9	7	8	19	9	18	13				142
13	(Finland) Vilho Aatola	3	3	12	2	4	5	16	20	9								132
14	(Mexico) Elías Vignola	17	7	19	21	DNS	6	14	21	DNS	5	4	14	15	9	7	12	128
15	(United States) Brenden Cooley	6	18	8	11	7	12	19	13	19	7	17	11	7				118
16	(United States) Grant Mitchell	14	14	11	14	17	21	17	17	15	10	15	7	8	18	17	13	109
17	(Colombia) Pipe Chaparro	20	12	10	19	10	22				11	7	15	14	17	4	11	106
18	(United States) John Main	11	16	21	7	18	14	15	15	17	9	6	16	17	19	12	19	105
19	(United States) Jared Oselka	13	13	20	20	14	9	13	19	13	20	8	13	18	20	20	15	88
20	(United States) Aryan Narola	15	21	17	15	21	15	21	18	DNS	18	10	17	16	13	5	16	81
21	(Canada) Alex Berg	21	17	9	17	3	8	12	16	12								79
22	(United States) Maddie Colleran	16	15	15	16	16	16				14	14	DNS	DNS	15	11	18	66
23	(United States) Connor Aspley	12	20	13	8	13	20	11	14	14								64
24	(Panama) Gianmatteo Rousseau														6	8	2	53
25	(United States) Indy Andersen														8	6	6	43
26	(United States) Alexander Savage														11	10	20	22
27	(Mexico) Juan Garciarce														16	9	17	21
28	(France) Arthur Barbe				13	15	17											18
29	(United States) Jack Haydu										16	13						13

=== Teams' championship ===
Scoring system

Position	1st	2nd	3rd	4th	5th	6th	7th	8th	9th	10th+
Points	22	18	15	12	10	8	6	4	2	1

- Single car teams receive 3 bonus points as an equivalency to multi-car teams.
- Only the best two results count for teams fielding more than two entries.

Pos	Team	HOM			CAR			CTP			MOH		LRP		ROA	Points
1	(United States) Zanella Racing	1	4	1	7	2	2	2	2	2	6	8	6	5		295
1	(United States) Zanella Racing	4	8	3	8	5	4	3	3	5	10	10	7	6		295
2	(United States) VRD Racing by Pole Position	10	1	11	3	1	1	7	4	3	1	1	3	1		273
2	(United States) VRD Racing by Pole Position				9	10	11	9	8	6	3	2	4	8		273
3	(United States) Olivia Racing	2	2	2	11	12	8	1	1	1	2	5	1	3		230
4	(United States) Exclusive Autosport	5	5	5	1	7	3	4	5	4	7	3	2	2		230
4	(United States) Exclusive Autosport	6	6	7	6	8	9	6	7	11	8	11	8	7		230
5	(United States) JHDD powered by ECR	7	9	4	4	6	12	5	6	7	4	6	5	4		147
5	(United States) JHDD powered by ECR	8	10	6	5	11	10	8	9	9	9	9	11	9		147
6	(United States) DEForce Racing	3	3	9	2	4	5	11	11	8	5	4	9	10		134
6	(United States) DEForce Racing	9	7	10	12	9	6	12	12	DNS	11	7	10	11		134
7	(Canada) Berg Racing	11	11	8	10	3	7	10	10	10						58

== See also ==
- 2026 IndyCar Series
- 2026 Indy NXT
- 2026 USF Pro 2000 Championship
- 2026 USF2000 Championship
