= 1998 Mosport Festival =

Mosport International Raceway

The 1998 Mosport Festival was a multi-class sports car and GT motor race held at Mosport International Raceway in Bowmanville, Ontario, Canada on August 9, 1998. It was the fifth round of the 1998 Professional SportsCar Racing Championship season. The race was held over a two-hour-and-45-minute time period, during which 128 laps of the 3.9-kilometre circuit were completed for a race distance of 506.544 kilometres.

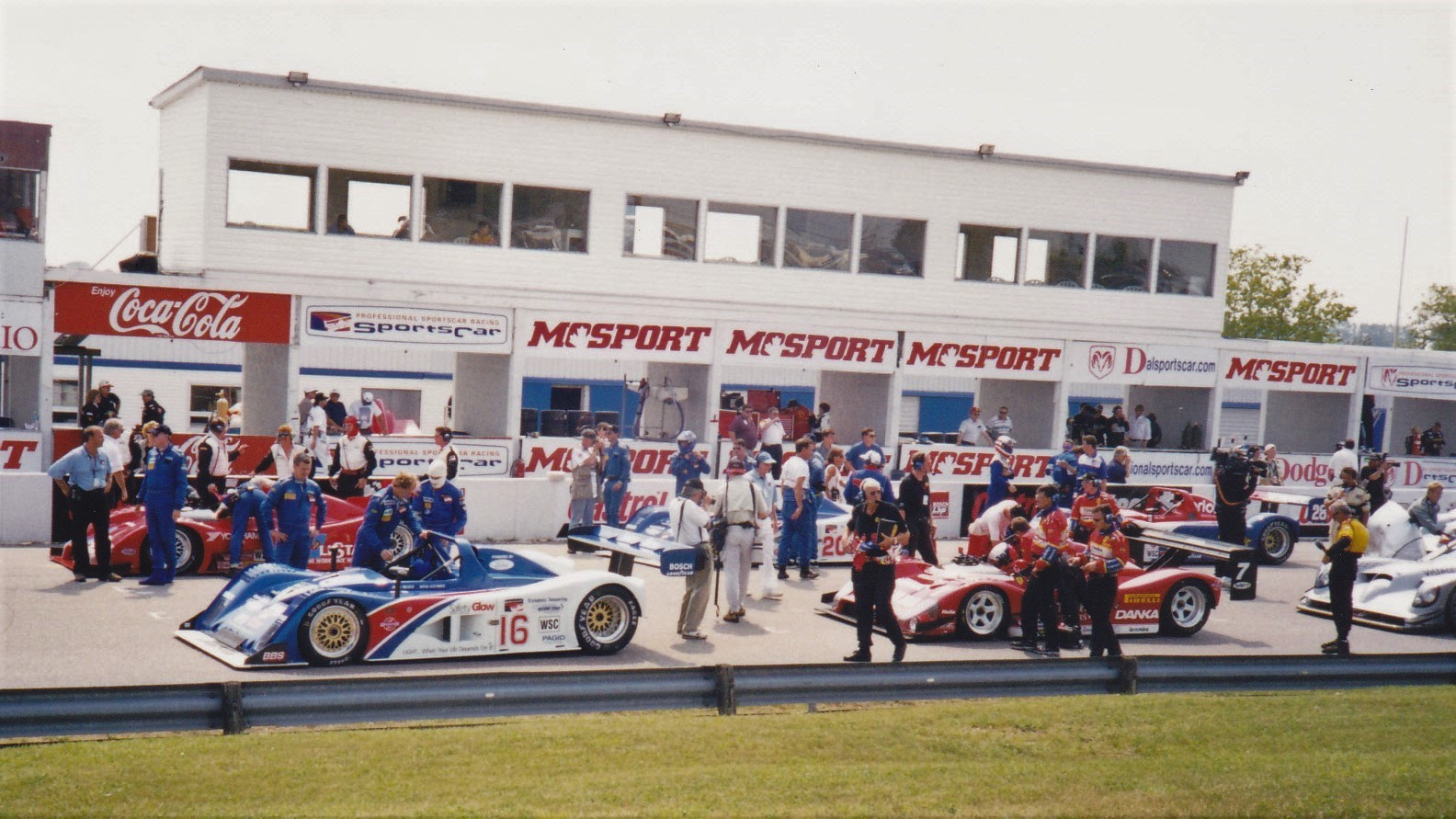
Pre-Race Grid

The race was won by the Dyson Racing team with drivers Butch Leitzinger and James Weaver driving a Riley & Scott Mk III-Ford. It was the 13th and final IMSA GT Championship race held at Mosport, with the championship being replaced by the American Le Mans Series in 1999.

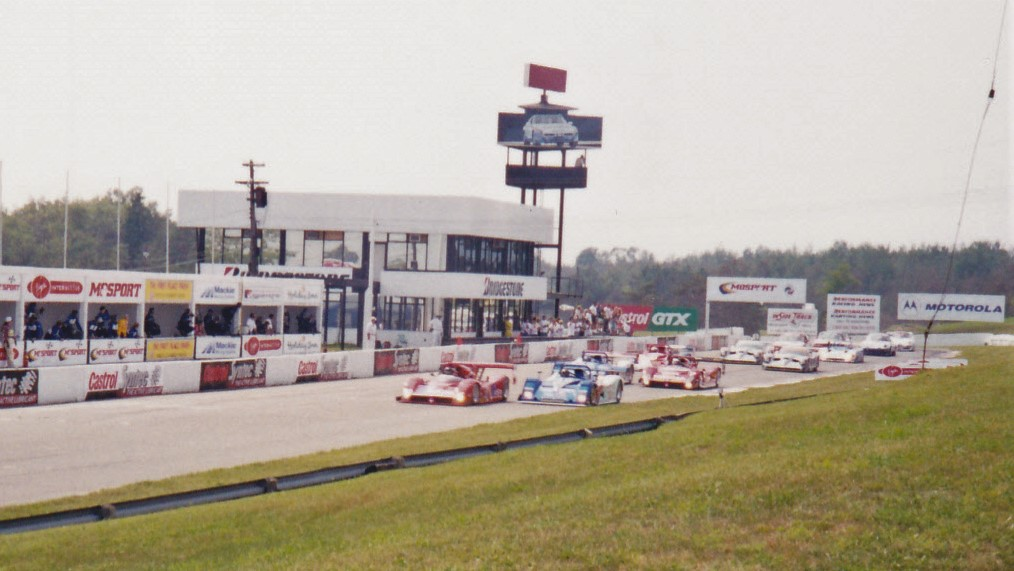
Race Start

== Race results ==
Class winners in bold.

Pos	Class	No	Team	Drivers	Chassis	Tyre	Laps
Pos	Class	No	Team	Drivers	Engine	Tyre	Laps
1	**WSC**	**16**	**Dyson Racing**	**(United States) Butch Leitzinger (United Kingdom) James Weaver**	**Riley & Scott Mk III**	G	**128**
1	**WSC**	**16**	**Dyson Racing**	**(United States) Butch Leitzinger (United Kingdom) James Weaver**	**Ford 5.0L V8**	G	**128**
2	WSC	20	Dyson Racing	(United States) Elliot Forbes-Robinson (United States) Dorsey Schroeder	Riley & Scott Mk III	G	128
2	WSC	20	Dyson Racing	(United States) Elliot Forbes-Robinson (United States) Dorsey Schroeder	Ford 5.0L V8	G	128
3	**GT1**	**4**	**Panoz Motorsports**	**(Australia) David Brabham (United Kingdom) Andy Wallace**	**Panoz GTR-1**	MI	**127**
3	**GT1**	**4**	**Panoz Motorsports**	**(Australia) David Brabham (United Kingdom) Andy Wallace**	**Ford (Roush) 6.0L V8**	MI	**127**
4	GT1	5	Panoz Motorsports	(France) Éric Bernard (Brazil) Raul Boesel	Panoz GTR-1	MI	127
4	GT1	5	Panoz Motorsports	(France) Éric Bernard (Brazil) Raul Boesel	Ford (Roush) 6.0L V8	MI	127
5	WSC	27	Doran Enterprises, Inc.	(Belgium) Didier Theys (Switzerland) Fredy Lienhard	Ferrari 333 SP	Y	126
5	WSC	27	Doran Enterprises, Inc.	(Belgium) Didier Theys (Switzerland) Fredy Lienhard	Ferrari F310E 4.0L V12	Y	126
6	WSC	7	Doyle-Risi Racing	(South Africa) Wayne Taylor (Belgium) Eric van de Poele	Ferrari 333 SP	P	123
6	WSC	7	Doyle-Risi Racing	(South Africa) Wayne Taylor (Belgium) Eric van de Poele	Ferrari F310E 4.0L V12	P	123
7	WSC	28	Intersport Racing	(United States) Jon Field (Canada) Jacek Mucha	Riley & Scott Mk III	G	119
7	WSC	28	Intersport Racing	(United States) Jon Field (Canada) Jacek Mucha	Ford 5.0L V8	G	119
8	WSC	63	Downing Atlanta	(United States) A.J. Smith (United States) Jim Downing	Kudzu DLM-4	G	119
8	WSC	63	Downing Atlanta	(United States) A.J. Smith (United States) Jim Downing	Mazda R26B 2.6L 4-Rotor	G	119
9	**GT3**	**10**	**Prototype Technology Group**	**(United States) Bill Auberlen (United States) Mark Simo**	**BMW M3**	Y	**112**
9	**GT3**	**10**	**Prototype Technology Group**	**(United States) Bill Auberlen (United States) Mark Simo**	**BMW 3.2L I6**	Y	**112**
10	GT3	1	Prototype Technology Group	(Canada) Ross Bentley (United States) Peter Cunningham	BMW M3	Y	111
10	GT3	1	Prototype Technology Group	(Canada) Ross Bentley (United States) Peter Cunningham	BMW 3.2L I6	Y	111
11	**GT2**	**6**	**Prototype Technology Group**	**(Belgium) Marc Duez (Canada) Ross Bentley**	**BMW M3**	Y	**111**
11	**GT2**	**6**	**Prototype Technology Group**	**(Belgium) Marc Duez (Canada) Ross Bentley**	**BMW 3.2L I6**	Y	**111**
12	GT2	99	Shumacher Racing	(United States) Larry Schumacher (United States) John O'Steen (United Kingdom) Andy Pilgrim	Porsche 911 GT2	P	110
12	GT2	99	Shumacher Racing	(United States) Larry Schumacher (United States) John O'Steen (United Kingdom) Andy Pilgrim	Porsche 3.6L Turbo Flat-6	P	110
13	GT2	04	C.J. Motorsports	(United States) John Morton (Canada) John Graham	Porsche 911 GT2	G	110
13	GT2	04	C.J. Motorsports	(United States) John Morton (Canada) John Graham	Porsche 3.6L Turbo Flat-6	G	110
14	GT3	23	Alex Job Racing	(United States) Cort Wagner (United States) Darryl Havens	Porsche 964 Carrera RSR	P	102
14	GT3	23	Alex Job Racing	(United States) Cort Wagner (United States) Darryl Havens	Porsche 3.8L Flat-6	P	102
15 DNF	GT2	00	David Friedman	(United States) David Friedman (United States) Nick Longhi	Porsche 993 Carrera RSR	G	53
15 DNF	GT2	00	David Friedman	(United States) David Friedman (United States) Nick Longhi	Porsche 3.6L Turbo Flat-6	G	53
DNS	GT3	22	Alex Job Racing	(United States) Darryl Havens (United States) Cort Wagner	Porsche 911 Carrera RSR	P	-
DNS	GT3	22	Alex Job Racing	(United States) Darryl Havens (United States) Cort Wagner	Porsche 3.8L Flat-6	P	-
