= Karol Pasiewicz =

Polish racing driver (born 2006)

- Nationality: (Poland) Polish
- Born: Karol Andrzej Pasiewicz; 13 May 2006 (age 20) Łódź, Poland

USF Juniors career
- Debut season: 2026
- Current team: Olivia Racing
- Car number: 25
- Starts: 16
- Wins: 6
- Podiums: 12
- Poles: 7
- Fastest laps: 4
- Best finish: 1st in 2026

Previous series
- 2026: YACademy Winter Series

Championship titles
- 2026: USF Juniors

Karol Andrzej Pasiewicz (born 13 May 2006) is a Polish racing driver who last competed for Olivia Racing in USF Juniors.

== Career ==
=== Karting (2012–2025) ===
Pasiewicz had his first taste of karting in 2012, at the GoKart Arena in his home town of Łódź. After making his competitive debut two years later, Pasiewicz won the national Micro Max title in 2015, before finishing runner-up the following year.

Moving up to mini karts in 2017, Pasiewicz won the Polish junior and Italian mini Rok titles, earning him an invitation to the Rok Cup International Final, in which he finished eighth. In 2018, Pasiewicz began primarily racing in international races, finishing second to Kimi Antonelli in the South Garda Winter Cup, as well as taking fourth in the WSK Champions Cup and WSK Super Master Series.

Pasiewicz then spent two years in junior karts, most notably finishing runner-up in the WSK Super Master Series and third in the WSK Open Cup in 2020. In 2021, Pasiewicz began racing in senior karts, finishing tenth in the WSK Super Master Series and fifth in the end-of-year WSK Final Cup. During 2022, Pasiewicz began competing in shifter karts, most notably winning the Rok Cup Superfinal and finishing third in the Andrea Margutti Trophy in 2025. During his time in shifter karts, Pasiewicz also briefly returned to direct-drive karts, most notably winning the 2024 WSK Open Series in OK-N.

=== USF Juniors (2026) ===
In 2026, Pasiewicz made his single-seater debut for Olivia Racing in the YACademy Winter Series, in which he scored a podium to secure runner-up honours. Continuing with the team to race in USF Juniors, Pasiewicz began the season by finishing second in all three races at the season-opening Homestead–Miami round. After a quiet round in South Carolina, Pasiewicz won all three races at Mosport in dominant fashion to take the points lead. Pasiewicz then took both poles at Mid-Ohio and finished second in race one, before taking his fourth win at Lime Rock to extend his points lead. At the Road America finale, Pasiewicz began the weekend by finishing second in race one to become USF Juniors' first European champion two races early, before winning said races and taking maximum points in both to round out his title-winning season.

=== USF2000 (2026) ===
During 2026, Pasiewicz and Olivia Racing made their USF2000 debut at Portland.

== Karting record ==
=== Karting career summary ===
| Season | Series | Team | Position |
|---|---|---|---|
| 2014 | Rotax Cup Poland – Micro Max | | 9th |
| 2015 | Euro Finale – Micro Max | | 4th |
| 2016 | Euro Finale – Micro Max | | 6th |
| 2017 | Rok Cup Italia – Mini Rok | | 1st |
| 2017 | Rok Cup Poland – Mini Rok | | 2nd |
| 2017 | Polish Karting Championship – Mini Rok | | 2nd |
| 2017 | Polish Karting Youth Championship – Mini Rok | | 1st |
| 2017 | Trofeo Invernal Ayrton Senna – 60 Mini | | 18th |
| 2017 | Rok Cup International Final – Mini Rok | | 8th |
| 2018 | WSK Champions Cup – 60 Mini | Revolution Motorsport | 4th |
| 2018 | WSK Super Master Series – 60 Mini | Revolution Motorsport | 4th |
| 2018 | South Garda Winter Cup – Mini Rok | Revolution Motorsport | 2nd |
| 2018 | Italian Karting Championship – 60 Mini | Revolution Motorsport | 7th |
| 2018 | WSK Open Cup – 60 Mini | Revolution Motorsport | 22nd |
| 2018 | WSK Final Cup – 60 Mini | EvoKart Srl | 18th |
| 2018 | Polish Karting Championship – OK-J | V-Kart Racing Team | 2nd |
| 2018 | IAME Series Poland – X30 Junior | V-Kart Racing Team | 2nd |
| 2019 | WSK Champions Cup – OK-J | Novalux Srl | 38th |
| 2019 | WSK Super Master Series – OK-J | Novalux Srl | 55th |
| 2019 | South Garda Winter Cup – OK-J | Novalux Srl | NC |
| 2019 | WSK Euro Series – OK-J | Novalux Srl | 36th |
| 2019 | Karting European Championship – OK-J | Novalux Srl; Kosmic Racing Department (Note: Pasiewicz competed for Novalux Srl in rounds 1–3 and for Kosmic Racing Department in round 4.) | 73rd |
| 2019 | Karting World Championship – OK-J | Kosmic Racing Department | 12th |
| 2019 | WSK Open Cup – OK-J | Kosmic Racing Department | 21st |
| 2019 | WSK Final Cup – OK-J | Kosmic Racing Department | 21st |
| 2019 | Rok Cup Superfinal – Junior Rok | | 10th |
| 2020 | WSK Super Master Series – OK-J | Tony Kart Racing Team | 2nd |
| 2020 | South Garda Winter Cup – OK-J | Tony Kart Racing Team | 34th |
| 2020 | WSK Euro Series – OK-J | Tony Kart Racing Team | 18th |
| 2020 | Champions of the Future – OK-J | Tony Kart Racing Team; Birel ART Racing (Note: Pasiewicz competed for Tony Kart Racing Team in round 1 and for Birel ART Racing in round 2.) | 30th |
| 2020 | Karting European Championship – OK-J | Tony Kart Racing Team | 6th |
| 2020 | Karting World Championship – OK-J | Birel ART Racing | 84th |
| 2020 | WSK Open Cup – OK-J | Birel ART Racing | 3rd |
| 2021 | WSK Champions Cup – OK | Kidix Srl | 11th |
| 2021 | WSK Super Master Series – OK | Kidix Srl | 10th |
| 2021 | Champions of the Future – OK | Kidix Srl; Ward Racing (Note: Pasiewicz competed for Kidix Srl in round 1 and for Ward Racing in round 2.) | 31st |
| 2021 | Karting European Championship – OK | Kidix Srl; DPK Racing (Note: Pasiewicz competed for Kidix Srl in rounds 1–3 and for DPK Racing in round 4.) | 35th |
| 2021 | WSK Euro Series – OK | DPK Racing | 54th |
| 2021 | WSK Open Cup – OK | DPK Racing | 28th |
| 2021 | Karting World Championship – OK | Ward Racing | 24th |
| 2021 | South Garda Winter Cup – OK | Ward Racing | 16th |
| 2021 | WSK Final Cup – OK | Ward Racing | 5th |
| 2022 | WSK Super Master Series – OK | Birel ART Racing | 22nd |
| 2022 | Champions of the Future Winter Series – OK | Birel ART Racing | 34th |
| 2022 | Champions of the Future – OK | Birel ART Racing | 31st |
| 2022 | Karting European Championship – OK | Birel ART Racing | 31st |
| 2022 | Karting European Championship – KZ2 | Birel ART Racing | NC |
| 2022 | WSK Euro Series – KZ2 | Birel ART Racing | 37th |
| 2022 | WSK Euro Series – OK | Birel ART Racing | 62nd |
| 2022 | Karting World Cup – KZ2 | Birel ART Racing | 86th |
| 2022 | Karting World Championship – OK | Birel ART Racing | 45th |
| 2023 | Florida Winter Tour – Senior Shifter | | 14th |
| 2023 | WSK Super Master Series – KZ2 | Novalux Srl | 34th |
| 2023 | Karting European Championship – KZ2 | Novalux Srl | 58th |
| 2023 | Karting World Cup – KZ2 | Novalux Srl | 110th |
| 2023 | Rok Cup Superfinal – Shifter Rok | | 7th |
| 2023 | SKUSA SuperNationals – Pro Shifter | | 36th |
| 2024 | Andrea Margutti Trophy – OK-N | Novalux Srl | 3rd |
| 2024 | WSK Open Series – OK-N | Novalux Srl | 1st |
| 2024 | Champions of the Future Shifters – KZ2 | Dorr Motorsport | NC |
| 2024 | Karting World Cup – KZ2 | Dorr Motorsport | 24th |
| 2024 | SKUSA SuperNationals – X30 Senior | | 40th |
| 2024 | Rok Cup Superfinal – Shifter Rok | | 1st |
| 2025 | Andrea Margutti Trophy – KZ2 | Magik Racing Team | 3rd |
| 2025 | Rok Cup Italia – Shifter Rok | Magik Racing Team | 1st |
| 2025 | Champions of the Future Shifters – KZ | Magik Racing Team | 35th |
| 2025 | Karting World Championship – KZ | Magik Racing Team | 20th |
| 2025 | WSK Final Cup – OK-N | Magik Racing Team | 13th |
| 2025 | Trofeo Delle Industrie – OK-N | Magik Racing Team | 3rd |
| 2025 | Rok Cup Superfinal – Shifter Rok | Magik Racing Team | 1st |
| 2026 | Karting World Cup – OK-N | Magik Racing Team | NC |

== Racing record ==
=== Racing career summary ===
| Season | Series | Team | Races | Wins | Poles | F/Laps | Podiums | Points | Position |
|---|---|---|---|---|---|---|---|---|---|
| 2026 | YACademy Winter Series | Olivia Racing | 6 | | | | 1 | 138 | **2nd** |
| 2026 | USF Juniors | Olivia Racing | 16 | 6 | 7 | 4 | 12 | 376 | **1st** |
| 2026 | USF2000 Championship | Olivia Racing | 2 | 0 | 0 | 0 | 0 | 19 | 30th |

=== American open wheel racing ===
==== USF Juniors ====
(key) (Races in bold indicate pole position) (Races in italics indicate fastest lap) (Races with * indicate most race laps led)

| Year | Team | 1 | 2 | 3 | 4 | 5 | 6 | 7 | 8 | 9 | 10 | 11 | 12 | 13 | 14 | 15 | 16 | Rank | Points |
|---|---|---|---|---|---|---|---|---|---|---|---|---|---|---|---|---|---|---|---|
| 2026 | Olivia Racing | HOM; 1; 2 | HOM; 2; 2 | HOM; 3; 2 | CAR; 1; 18 | CAR; 2; 20 | CAR; 3; 11 | **CTP**; **1**; 1* | **CTP**; **2**; 1* | **CTP**; **3**; 1* | **MOH**; **1**; 2 | **MOH**; **2**; 5* | LRP; 1; 1 | LRP; 2; 3 | ROA; 1; 2 | **ROA**; **2**; 1* | **ROA**; **3**; 1* | 1st | 376 |

==== USF2000 Championship ====
(key) (Races in bold indicate pole position) (Races in italics indicate fastest lap) (Races with * indicate most race laps led)

| Year | Team | 1 | 2 | 3 | 4 | 5 | 6 | 7 | 8 | 9 | 10 | 11 | 12 | 13 | 14 | 15 | 16 | 17 | 18 | Rank | Points |
|---|---|---|---|---|---|---|---|---|---|---|---|---|---|---|---|---|---|---|---|---|---|
| 2026 | Olivia Racing | STP; 1 | STP; 2 | IMS; 1 | IMS; 2 | IMS; 3 | IRP | ROA1; 1 | ROA1; 2 | ROA1; 3 | MOH; 1 | MOH; 2 | POR; 1; 17 | POR; 2; 6 | MAR; 1 | MAR; 2 | ROA2; 1 | ROA2; 2 | ROA2; 3 | 30th | 19 |
