= 2008 Grand Prix of Mosport =

Mosport International Raceway

The Mobil 1 Presents Grand Prix of Mosport was the eighth round of the 2008 American Le Mans Series season. It took place at Mosport International Raceway, Ontario, Canada on August 24, 2008. Temperatures had reached a maximum of 27.1 °C (80.8 °F); with wind speeds of up to 9.9 kilometres per hour (6.2 mph) not unheard of throughout the day.

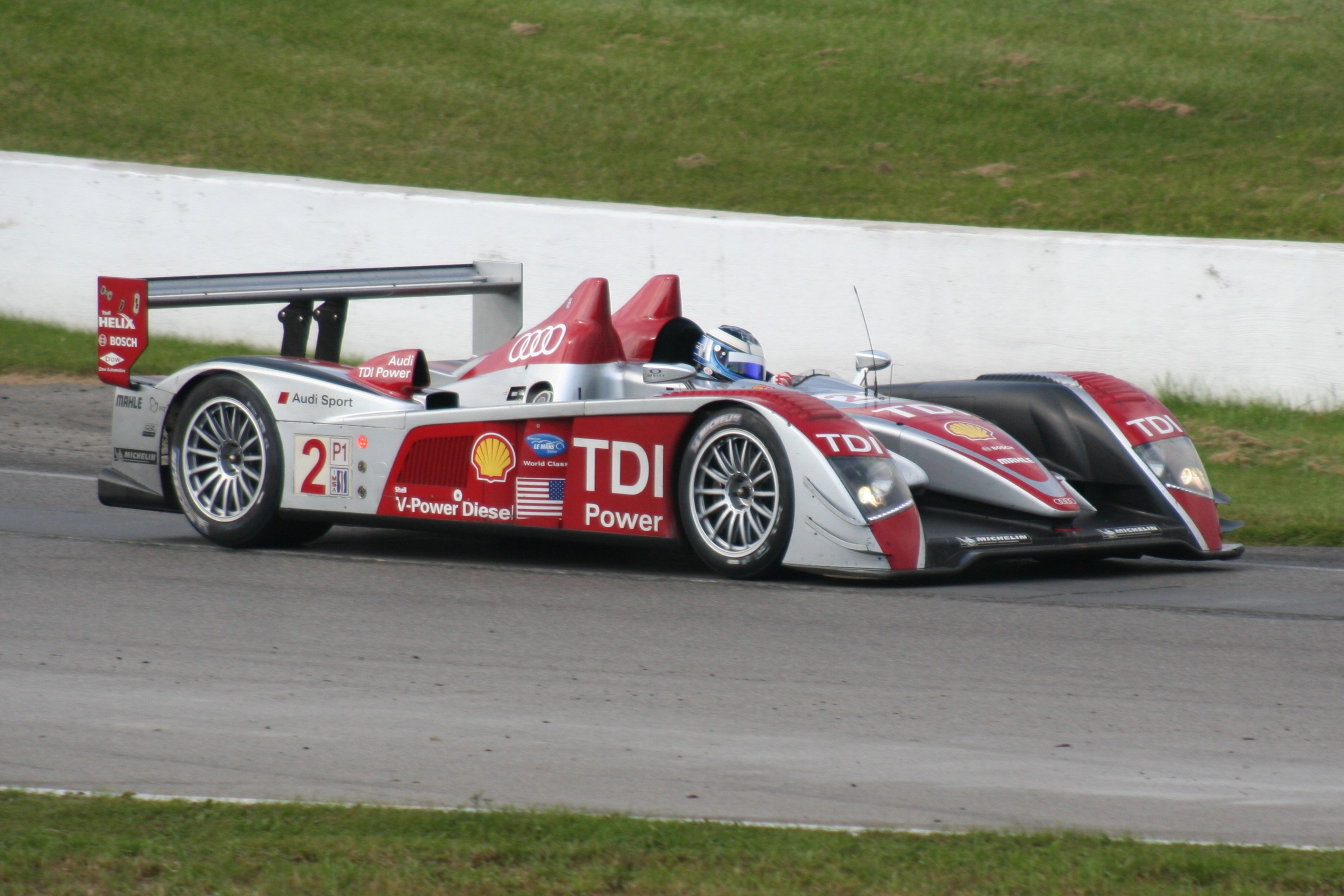
Audi Sport North America Audi R10 TDI - Winner 2008 Grand Prix of Mosport

== Race results ==
Class winners in bold. Cars failing to complete 70% of winner's distance marked as Not Classified (NC).

Pos	Class	No	Team	Drivers	Chassis	Tyre	Laps
Pos	Class	No	Team	Drivers	Engine	Tyre	Laps
1	**LMP1**	**2**	**(United States) Audi Sport North America**	**(Germany) Marco Werner (Germany) Lucas Luhr**	**Audi R10 TDI**	MI	**127**
1	**LMP1**	**2**	**(United States) Audi Sport North America**	**(Germany) Marco Werner (Germany) Lucas Luhr**	**Audi TDI 5.5 L Turbo V12 (Diesel)**	MI	**127**
2	LMP1	1	(United States) Audi Sport North America	(Italy) Emanuele Pirro (Italy) Rinaldo Capello	Audi R10 TDI	MI	127
2	LMP1	1	(United States) Audi Sport North America	(Italy) Emanuele Pirro (Italy) Rinaldo Capello	Audi TDI 5.5 L Turbo V12 (Diesel)	MI	127
3	**LMP2**	**9**	**(United States) Patrón Highcroft Racing**	**(United States) Scott Sharp (Australia) David Brabham**	**Acura ARX-01B**	MI	**127**
3	**LMP2**	**9**	**(United States) Patrón Highcroft Racing**	**(United States) Scott Sharp (Australia) David Brabham**	**Acura AL7R 3.4 L V8**	MI	**127**
4	LMP2	15	(Mexico) Lowe's Fernández Racing	(Mexico) Adrian Fernández (Mexico) Luis Díaz	Acura ARX-01B	MI	127
4	LMP2	15	(Mexico) Lowe's Fernández Racing	(Mexico) Adrian Fernández (Mexico) Luis Díaz	Acura AL7R 3.4 L V8	MI	127
5	LMP2	6	(United States) Penske Racing	(United States) Patrick Long (Germany) Sascha Maassen	Porsche RS Spyder Evo	MI	127
5	LMP2	6	(United States) Penske Racing	(United States) Patrick Long (Germany) Sascha Maassen	Porsche MR6 3.4 L V8	MI	127
6	LMP2	26	(United States) Andretti Green Racing	(France) Franck Montagny (United Kingdom) James Rossiter	Acura ARX-01B	MI	127
6	LMP2	26	(United States) Andretti Green Racing	(France) Franck Montagny (United Kingdom) James Rossiter	Acura AL7R 3.4 L V8	MI	127
7 DNF	LMP2	66	(United States) de Ferran Motorsports	(Brazil) Gil de Ferran (France) Simon Pagenaud	Acura ARX-01B	MI	126
7 DNF	LMP2	66	(United States) de Ferran Motorsports	(Brazil) Gil de Ferran (France) Simon Pagenaud	Acura AL7R 3.4 L V8	MI	126
8 DNF	LMP2	7	(United States) Penske Racing	(Germany) Timo Bernhard (France) Romain Dumas	Porsche RS Spyder Evo	MI	126
8 DNF	LMP2	7	(United States) Penske Racing	(Germany) Timo Bernhard (France) Romain Dumas	Porsche MR6 3.4 L V8	MI	126
9	LMP2	16	(United States) Dyson Racing	(United States) Chris Dyson (United Kingdom) Guy Smith	Porsche RS Spyder Evo	MI	125
9	LMP2	16	(United States) Dyson Racing	(United States) Chris Dyson (United Kingdom) Guy Smith	Porsche MR6 3.4 L V8	MI	125
10	LMP2	20	(United States) Dyson Racing	(United States) Butch Leitzinger (United Kingdom) Marino Franchitti	Porsche RS Spyder Evo	MI	125
10	LMP2	20	(United States) Dyson Racing	(United States) Butch Leitzinger (United Kingdom) Marino Franchitti	Porsche MR6 3.4 L V8	MI	125
11	LMP2	8	(United States) B-K Motorsports	(United States) Gerardo Bonilla (United Kingdom) Ben Devlin	Lola B07/46	D	121
11	LMP2	8	(United States) B-K Motorsports	(United States) Gerardo Bonilla (United Kingdom) Ben Devlin	Mazda MZR-R 2.0 L Turbo I4 (E85 ethanol)	D	121
12	**GT1**	**3**	**(United States) Corvette Racing**	**(United States) Johnny O'Connell (Denmark) Jan Magnussen**	**Chevrolet Corvette C6.R**	MI	**117**
12	**GT1**	**3**	**(United States) Corvette Racing**	**(United States) Johnny O'Connell (Denmark) Jan Magnussen**	**Chevrolet LS7-R 7.0 L V8 (E85 ethanol)**	MI	**117**
13	GT1	4	(United States) Corvette Racing	(United Kingdom) Oliver Gavin (Monaco) Olivier Beretta	Chevrolet Corvette C6.R	MI	117
13	GT1	4	(United States) Corvette Racing	(United Kingdom) Oliver Gavin (Monaco) Olivier Beretta	Chevrolet LS7-R 7.0 L V8 (E85 ethanol)	MI	117
14	GT1	008	(United States) Bell Motorsports	(United States) Terry Borcheller (United States) Chapman Ducote	Aston Martin DBR9	D	115
14	GT1	008	(United States) Bell Motorsports	(United States) Terry Borcheller (United States) Chapman Ducote	Aston Martin 6.0 L V12	D	115
15	**GT2**	**62**	**(United States) Risi Competizione**	**(Brazil) Jaime Melo (Finland) Mika Salo**	**Ferrari F430GT**	MI	**113**
15	**GT2**	**62**	**(United States) Risi Competizione**	**(Brazil) Jaime Melo (Finland) Mika Salo**	**Ferrari 4.0 L V8**	MI	**113**
16	GT2	87	(United States) Farnbacher-Loles Motorsports	(Germany) Pierre Kaffer (Germany) Dirk Werner	Porsche 997 GT3-RSR	MI	113
16	GT2	87	(United States) Farnbacher-Loles Motorsports	(Germany) Pierre Kaffer (Germany) Dirk Werner	Porsche 4.0 L Flat-6	MI	113
17	GT2	45	(United States) Flying Lizard Motorsports	(Germany) Jörg Bergmeister (Germany) Wolf Henzler	Porsche 997 GT3-RSR	MI	113
17	GT2	45	(United States) Flying Lizard Motorsports	(Germany) Jörg Bergmeister (Germany) Wolf Henzler	Porsche 4.0 L Flat-6	MI	113
18^{†}	GT2	71	(United States) Tafel Racing	(Germany) Dominik Farnbacher (Germany) Dirk Müller	Ferrari F430GT	MI	113
18^{†}	GT2	71	(United States) Tafel Racing	(Germany) Dominik Farnbacher (Germany) Dirk Müller	Ferrari 4.0 L V8	MI	113
19	GT2	21	(United States) Panoz Team PTG	(United States) Tommy Milner (United States) Tom Sutherland (United States) Bryan Sellers	Panoz Esperante GT-LM	D	112
19	GT2	21	(United States) Panoz Team PTG	(United States) Tommy Milner (United States) Tom Sutherland (United States) Bryan Sellers	Ford (Élan) 5.0 L V8	D	112
20	GT2	73	(United States) Tafel Racing	(United States) Jim Tafel (United States) Alex Figge	Ferrari F430GT	MI	111
20	GT2	73	(United States) Tafel Racing	(United States) Jim Tafel (United States) Alex Figge	Ferrari 4.0 L V8	MI	111
21	GT2	44	(United States) Flying Lizard Motorsports 44	(United States) Lonnie Pechnik (United States) Seth Neiman	Porsche 997 GT3-RSR	MI	111
21	GT2	44	(United States) Flying Lizard Motorsports 44	(United States) Lonnie Pechnik (United States) Seth Neiman	Porsche 4.0 L Flat-6	MI	111
22	GT2	007	(United Kingdom) Drayson-Barwell	(United Kingdom) Paul Drayson (United Kingdom) Jonny Cocker	Aston Martin V8 Vantage GT2	D	109
22	GT2	007	(United Kingdom) Drayson-Barwell	(United Kingdom) Paul Drayson (United Kingdom) Jonny Cocker	Aston Martin 4.5 L V8 (E85 ethanol)	D	109
23	GT2	46	(United States) Flying Lizard Motorsports	(United States) Johannes van Overbeek (France) Patrick Pilet	Porsche 997 GT3-RSR	MI	105
23	GT2	46	(United States) Flying Lizard Motorsports	(United States) Johannes van Overbeek (France) Patrick Pilet	Porsche 4.0 L Flat-6	MI	105
24	GT2	11	(United States) Primetime Race Group	(United States) Joel Feinberg (United Kingdom) Chris Hall	Dodge Viper Competition Coupe	HK	105
24	GT2	11	(United States) Primetime Race Group	(United States) Joel Feinberg (United Kingdom) Chris Hall	Dodge 8.3 L V10	HK	105
25 DNF	LMP1	37	(United States) Intersport Racing	(United States) Jon Field (United States) Clint Field (United States) Richard Berry	Lola B06/10	D	86
25 DNF	LMP1	37	(United States) Intersport Racing	(United States) Jon Field (United States) Clint Field (United States) Richard Berry	AER P32C 4.0 L Turbo V8 (E85 ethanol)	D	86
26 DNF	LMP1	30	(United States) Intersport Racing	(United Kingdom) Ryan Lewis (United States) John Faulkner	Lola B06/10	KU	64
26 DNF	LMP1	30	(United States) Intersport Racing	(United Kingdom) Ryan Lewis (United States) John Faulkner	AER P32C 3.6 L Turbo V8	KU	64
27 DNF	LMP1	12	(United States) Autocon Motorsports	(United States) Chris McMurry (Canada) Tony Burgess	Creation CA07	D	42
27 DNF	LMP1	12	(United States) Autocon Motorsports	(United States) Chris McMurry (Canada) Tony Burgess	Judd GV5 5.0 L V10	D	42
28 DNF	GT2	18	(Germany) VICI Racing	(Netherlands) Nicky Pastorelli (Netherlands) Francesco Pastorelli (Germany) Marc Basseng	Porsche 997 GT3-RSR	KU	29
28 DNF	GT2	18	(Germany) VICI Racing	(Netherlands) Nicky Pastorelli (Netherlands) Francesco Pastorelli (Germany) Marc Basseng	Porsche 4.0 L Flat-6	KU	29
DNS	GT2	40	(United States) Robertson Racing	(United States) David Robertson (United States) Andrea Robertson (United States) David Murry	Ford GT-R Mk.VII	D	-
DNS	GT2	40	(United States) Robertson Racing	(United States) David Robertson (United States) Andrea Robertson (United States) David Murry	Ford 5.0 L V8	D	-
ALMS FINAL RACE REPORT

† - The #71 Tafel Racing entry was penalized after the race for making repeated contact with the #45 Flying Lizard Motorsports entry. 30 seconds was added to the #71's time, losing it one position in the final standings.

== Statistics ==
- Pole Position - #2 Audi Sport North America - 1:04.094
- Fastest Lap - #2 Audi Sport North America - 1:05.823

American Le Mans Series
Previous race: 2008 Road America 500	2008 season	Next race: 2008 Detroit Sports Car Challenge
