= Canadian Tire Motorsport Park =

Motorsport track in Canada

"Canada's Home of Motorsport"

- Location: 3233 Concession Road 10; Clarington, Ontario, Canada
- Coordinates: 44°03′00″N 78°40′40″W
- Capacity: Open seating without capacity limitation
- FIA Grade: 2
- Owner: Canadian Motorsports Ventures Ltd. (2011–2025); Peter Thomson (2025–present)
- Broke ground: 1960
- Opened: June 1961; 65 years ago
- Construction cost: $500,000
- Architect: Alan Bunting
- Former names: Mosport International Raceway (1997–February 2012); Mosport Park (1961–1996)
- Major events: Current: IMSA SportsCar Championship; Chevrolet Grand Prix (1975–1977, 1980–1985, 1989–1992, 1995–2019, 2022–present); NASCAR Canada Series; CarGurus 200 (2007–2019, 2021–present); WeatherTech 200 (2013–2019, 2021–present); Clarington 200 (2007–2013); Trans-Am Series; Mosport Trans-Am (1976–1979, 1981, 1984–1997, 1999–2003, 2009–2014, 2024–present); SCC Canada (2021–present); CSBK (1980–present); Future; NASCAR Truck Series; Chevrolet Silverado 250 (2013–2019, 2027); Former: Formula One; Canadian Grand Prix (1961–1967, 1969, 1971–1974, 1976–1977); Grand Prix motorcycle racing Canadian motorcycle Grand Prix (1967); Can-Am; Mosport Can-Am (1966–1967, 1969–1974, 1977–1986); World SBK (1989–1991); GT World Challenge America (1990–1997, 1999–2012, 2014–2019)
- Website: http://www.mosport.com/

Clockwise Grand Prix Circuit (1961–present)
- Surface: Asphalt
- Length: 3.957 km (2.459 mi)
- Turns: 10
- Race lap record: 1:05.823 ( (Germany) Marco Werner, Audi R10 TDI, 2008, LMP1)

Driver Development Centre Advanced Course (2014–present)
- Surface: Asphalt
- Length: 2.880 km (1.790 mi)
- Turns: 20

Driver Development Centre Intermediate Course (2014–present)
- Surface: Asphalt
- Length: 2.200 km (1.367 mi)

Kart Complex (2014–present)
- Surface: Asphalt
- Length: 1.500 km (0.932 mi)
- Turns: 12

Speedway Oval (1989–2013)
- Surface: Asphalt
- Length: 0.805 km (0.500 mi)
- Banking: 6°

Canadian Tire Motorsport Park (formerly known as Mosport Park and Mosport International Raceway) is a multi-track motorsport venue that is located north of Orono in Clarington, Ontario, Canada, which is approximately 75 km (47 mi) east of Toronto. The facility features a 3.957 km (2.459 mi), 10-turn road course; a 2.900 km (1.802 mi) advance driver and race driver training facility with a 0.402 km (0.250 mi) skid pad (Driver Development Centre) and a 1.500 km (0.932 mi) kart track (Mosport Karting Centre Inc., previously "Mosport Kartways"). The name "Mosport", a portmanteau of Motor Sport, came from the enterprise formed to build the track.

== History ==
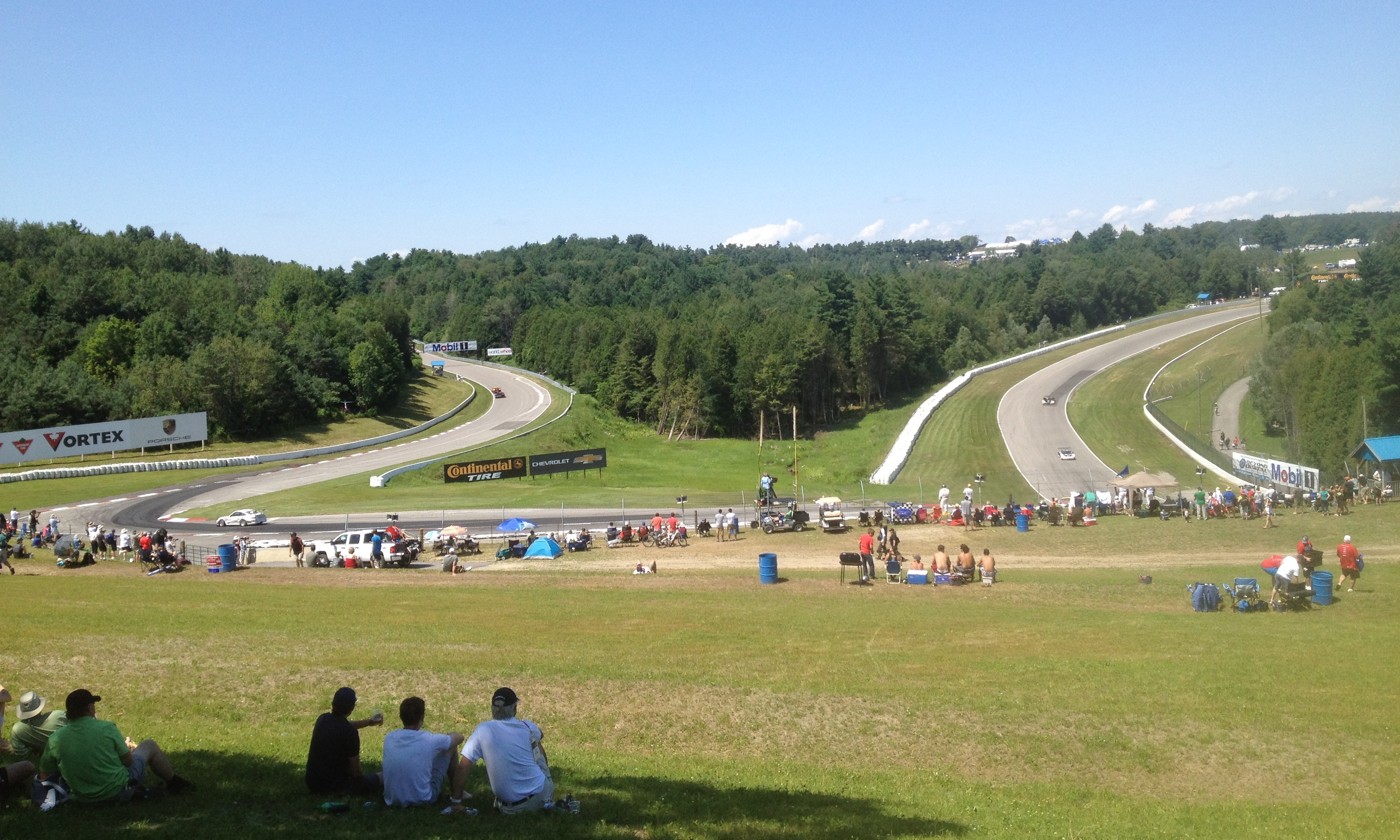
Moss Corner – Turn 5a and 5b.

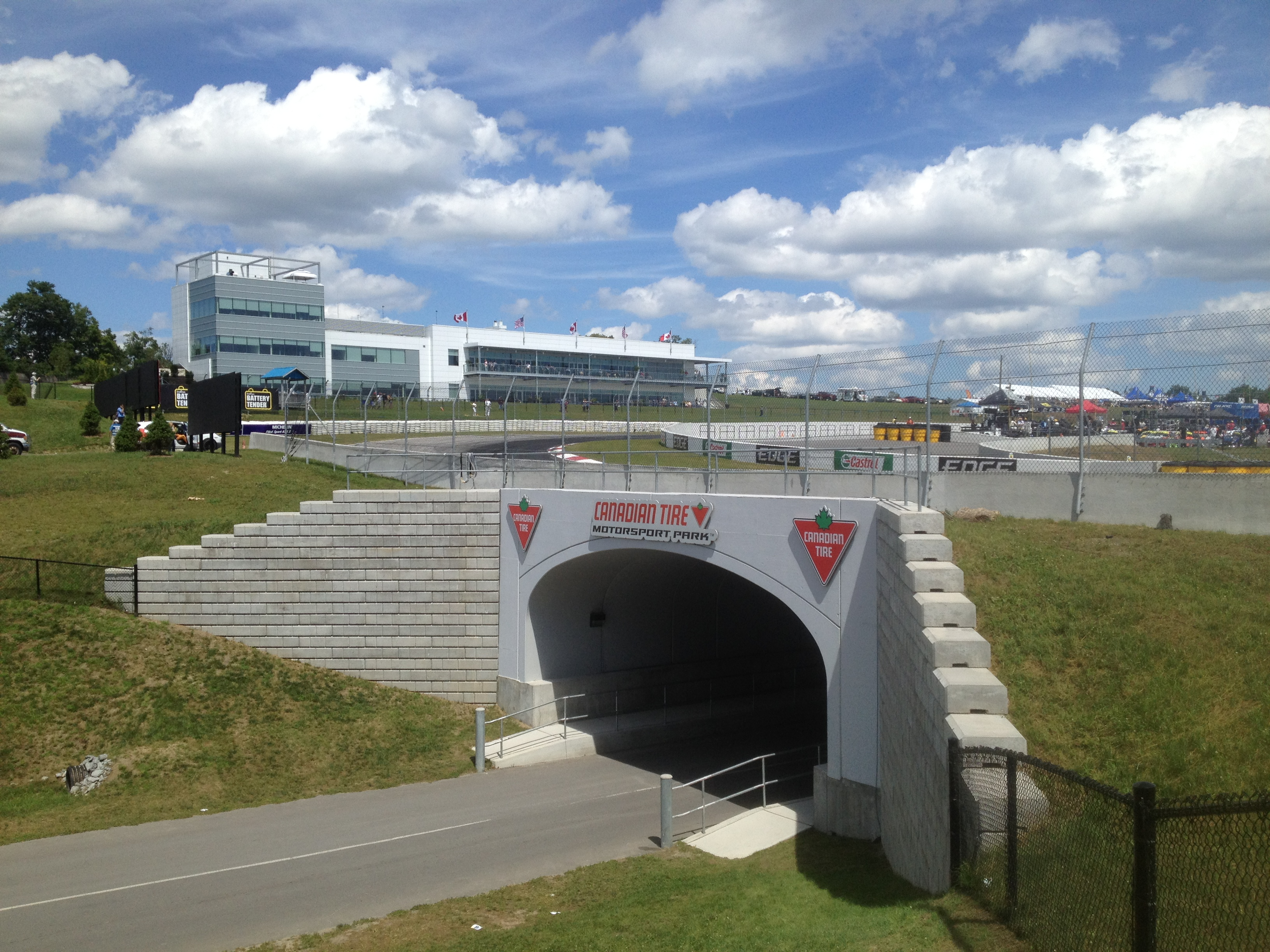
Tunnel, Whites Corner – Turn 10 and Event Centre.

The circuit was the second purpose-built road race course in Canada after Westwood Motorsport Park in Coquitlam, British Columbia, succeeding Edenvale (Stayner, Ontario), Port Albert, Ontario's Green Acres (ex-British Commonwealth Air Training Plan), and Nanticoke, Ontario's Harewood Acres (ex-British Commonwealth Air Training Plan Number One Bombing and Gunnery School), all airport circuits, as Ontario racing venues.

The track was designed and built in the late 1950s. The first race to be held on the track was a local event organized by the Oakville Light Car Club in June 1961. Shortly thereafter, on June 25, the venue held its first major race, the Player's 200, a sports car race bringing drivers from the world over to rural Ontario. Stirling Moss won the two-heat event in a Lotus 19. Second was Joakim Bonnier with Olivier Gendebien third. The proposed hairpin was expanded into two discrete corners, to be of greater challenge to the drivers and more interesting for the spectators, at his suggestion, and is named Moss Corner in his honour. This is a source of lingering confusion as many people call the track Mossport. Unlike many historic motorsport venues, Mosport's track layout has remained mostly unchanged from its original form.

For 2001, the entire circuit was repaved to meet FIA specifications, and is now 13 m (42 ft) wide. Drivers were consulted to ensure the character of the "old" track was kept; almost all the "racing lines" have been maintained.

Mosport achieved acclaim through a series of international sports car races under the title "Canadian Grand Prix" normally reserved for Formula 1 races. Many events were wildly popular, breaking Canadian sports attendance records with each successive race. The success of these races led Mosport to be seen as a key component in the founding of the Can Am Series.

The Can-Am first visited the track in its inaugural season in 1966, and Mosport hosted at least one event in every year of the series' history, except 1968. In 1967, Canada's centennial year, Mosport hosted Formula One, USAC, and a 500cc Motorcycle Grand Prix. F1's Grand Prix of Canada remained at the track until 1977, until it was moved to Montreal. Mosport has hosted a wide variety of series throughout its history. The circuit has held Formula One, USAC, World Sportscar Championship, Can-Am, Formula 5000, and many other sports car, open-wheel, and motorcycle series.

Mosport has had several fatalities, both track crew, drivers, and riders, the most recognized being German Formula One driver Manfred Winkelhock who was killed in 1985 when his Porsche 962C crashed into a concrete wall. Another fatality at the track was in 2008 during the 29th annual Vintage Automobile Racing Association of Canada Racing Festival. Driver Dino Crescentini of Rochester Hills, MI – a ten-year veteran of vintage racing – lost control of his 1977 Wolf Dallara Can-Am car, which previously had been driven by Gilles Villeneuve. The most recent fatality was in 2018 when 61 year old former Pro Mazda driver Jeff Green speared off the racetrack at turn 8, and slammed into the barrier. He was attended to quickly but was unable to survive the crash.

Mosport has had a succession of owners since the original public company created to build the track. Two of those prior owners, Norm Namerow (who owned the track through his publishing company, CanTrack, until his death) and Harvey Hudes, have both been inducted into the Canadian Motorsport Hall of Fame for their contribution to the sport in Canada. In 1998, Panoz Motorsports purchased the facility, and in 1999, the newly formed American Le Mans Series visited Mosport for the first time.

Canadian Motorsports Ventures Ltd. (CMV) which includes Orlando Corp. Chairman Carlo Fidani and Canadian road racing driver Ron Fellows, purchased the facility in June 2011.

In February 2012, a partnership between Mosport and Canadian Tire was announced. The partnership includes a renaming of the track to Canadian Tire Motorsport Park.

== Driver Development Centre ==
In the spring of 2000, Mosport opened the Driver Development Centre, a second 1.700 km (1.056 mi), 12 turn training circuit designed for driver development. The new course was designed by the owners and instructors of the Bridgestone Racing Academy and was designed specifically with fewer guard rails, walls and minimum blind corners to meet the needs of their driver and mechanic training program.

Due to significant scheduling demands on the original Grand Prix circuit, the original academy course was reconstructed and lengthened to a full racing course in the fall of 2013. The new track features two configuration options; a 2.200 km (1.367 mi) intermediate course, a 2.900 km (1.802 mi) advanced course, as well as a skid pad, a pit lane, and a multi-storey event centre with classrooms and other facilities.

Prior to the Driver Development Centre, Mosport was home to the Bridgestone Racing Academy from 2000 to 2019, which conducted corporate programs, racing schools, and a Mechanics Training Program. The academy itself was originally established at Shannonville Motorsport Park, when owners Charlie and Brett Goodman acquired the cars and equipment of the former Spenard-David Racing School and teamed with then-Bridgestone/Firestone Canada Inc.

== Mosport Speedway ==
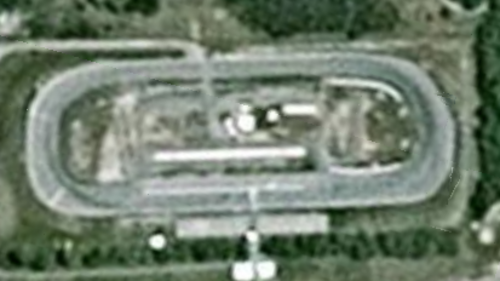
Mosport Speedway in August 2009 after the Canadian Tire Series race there

Mosport Speedway was a 0.805 km (0.500 mi) oval speedway located on the northwest corner of Canadian Tire Motorsport Park. The track featured 240 m-long (800 ft) straightaways, 6-degree banked corners and two grandstands with seating for 8,500. The oval was constructed in 1989 as a dirt track originally called Mosport's Ascot North, named after the famous Ascot Park track in Gardena, California. The first event was scheduled in July 1989 and was to feature USAC Midgets and Sprint Cars and the World of Outlaws. The races were cancelled after the initial heat races caused deep ruts in the corners and dislodging stones hidden under the clay.

The track was paved that summer and renamed Mosport International Speedway. The track hosted a weekly Saturday night stock car racing program from May to September for 24 years. The stock car divisions included pure stock, sportsman and late models. The oval also featured regular touring series including the ACT Series, ISMA Supermodifieds, OSCAAR, Lucas Oil Sportsman Cup, CASCAR Super Series and the NASCAR Canadian Tire Series.

The park announced the closing of the oval in July 2013 to accommodate the expansion of the Driver Development Centre.

== Major series ==
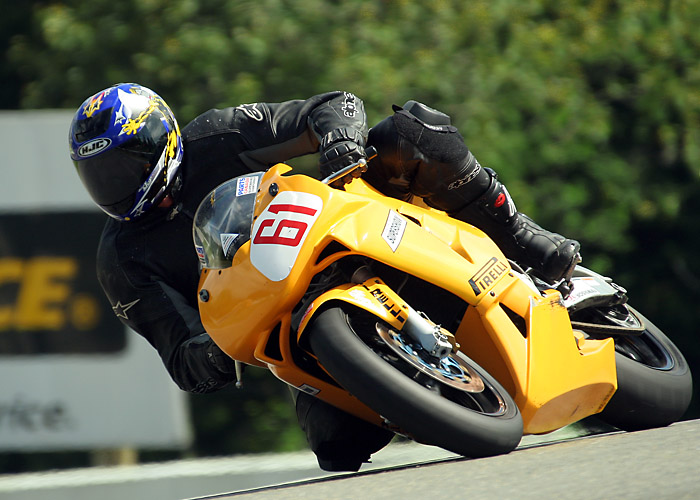
A motorcycle racer at Mosport

=== IMSA WeatherTech SportsCar Championship ===
It was announced in September 2013 that Canadian Tire Motorsports Park was chosen to host an annual round of the IMSA SportsCar Championship beginning in 2014. The new series replaced the American Le Mans Series as the feature race during the tracks annual SportsCar Grand Prix, which is Canada's largest annual sportscar race.

=== NASCAR Canada Series ===
The NASCAR Canada Series has visited the facility at least twice annually every year since its inaugural season in 2007. Currently the race is known as the CarGurus 200 and takes place during the tracks Victoria Day SpeedFest Weekend and its Chevrolet Silverado 250 weekend.

== Events ==
Current

- May: NASCAR Canada Series CarGurus 200, Radical Cup Canada, USF Juniors
- June: VARAC Vintage Grand Prix
- July: IMSA SportsCar Championship Chevrolet Grand Prix, Michelin Pilot Challenge, IMSA VP Racing SportsCar Challenge, Mazda MX-5 Cup
- August: Canadian Superbike Championship
- September: Trans-Am Series Mosport Trans-Am, Formula Regional Americas Championship, Formula 4 United States Championship, NASCAR Canada Series WeatherTech 200, Sports Car Championship Canada, Radical Cup Canada

Future

- Ferrari Challenge North America (1994–1995, 2013, 2015, 2017, 2027)
- NASCAR Truck Series Chevrolet Silverado 250 (2013–2019, 2027)

Former

- American Le Mans Series
  - Mobil 1 SportsCar Grand Prix (1999–2013)
- ASA National Tour (1992)
- Atlantic Championship (1974–1977, 1979, 1981–1983, 1987–1989, 1992–1994, 2009)
- Can-Am
  - Mosport Can-Am (1966–1967, 1969–1974, 1977–1986)
- Canadian Sports Car Championship (1961–1968)
- CASCAR Super Series (1991–1992, 1996, 1998–2006)
- Formula 750 (1977–1979)
- Formula BMW Americas (2006–2007, 2009)
- Formula One
  - Canadian Grand Prix (1961–1967, 1969, 1971–1974, 1976–1977)
- Grand Prix motorcycle racing
  - Canadian motorcycle Grand Prix (1967)
- GT World Challenge America (1990–1997, 1999–2012, 2014–2019)
- IMSA GT Championship
  - Mosport Festival (1975, 1980–1983, 1989–1992, 1995–1998)
- IMSA GT3 Cup Challenge (2006–2009, 2011–2015)
- IMSA Prototype Challenge (2008–2019, 2022)
- Lamborghini Super Trofeo North America (2014)
- Motocross World Championship (1976–1977, 1979)
- NASCAR Canadian Tire Series
  - Clarington 200 (2007–2013)
- Porsche GT3 Cup Challenge Canada (2011–2019)
- Pro Mazda Championship (2000–2011, 2013)
- SCCA Formula 5000 Championship (1968–1970, 1974–1976)
- SCCA Formula Super Vee Championship (1974–1977, 1979, 1982–1983)
- Sports Car Championship Canada (2021–2024)
- Superbike World Championship (1989–1991)
- USAC IndyCar
  - Molson Diamond Indy (1967–1968, 1977–1978)
- USAC Stock Car (1962, 1966–1968, 1978)
- World Sportscar Championship (1976–1977, 1980–1981, 1984–1985)

The track also hosts vintage racing series, motorcycle racing, and Canadian Automobile Sport Club (CASC) amateur events and lapping days.

== Photo gallery ==
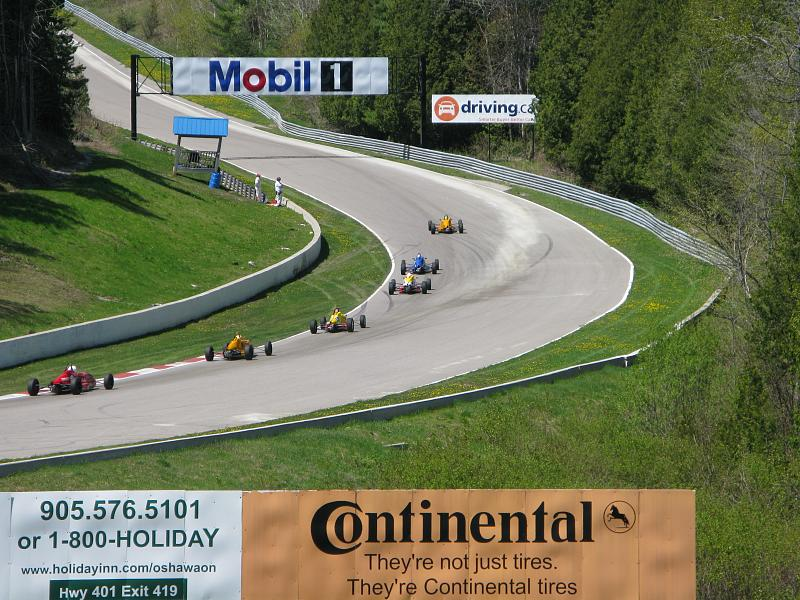
A line of Formula Ford cars climb the hill through turn 5(c)

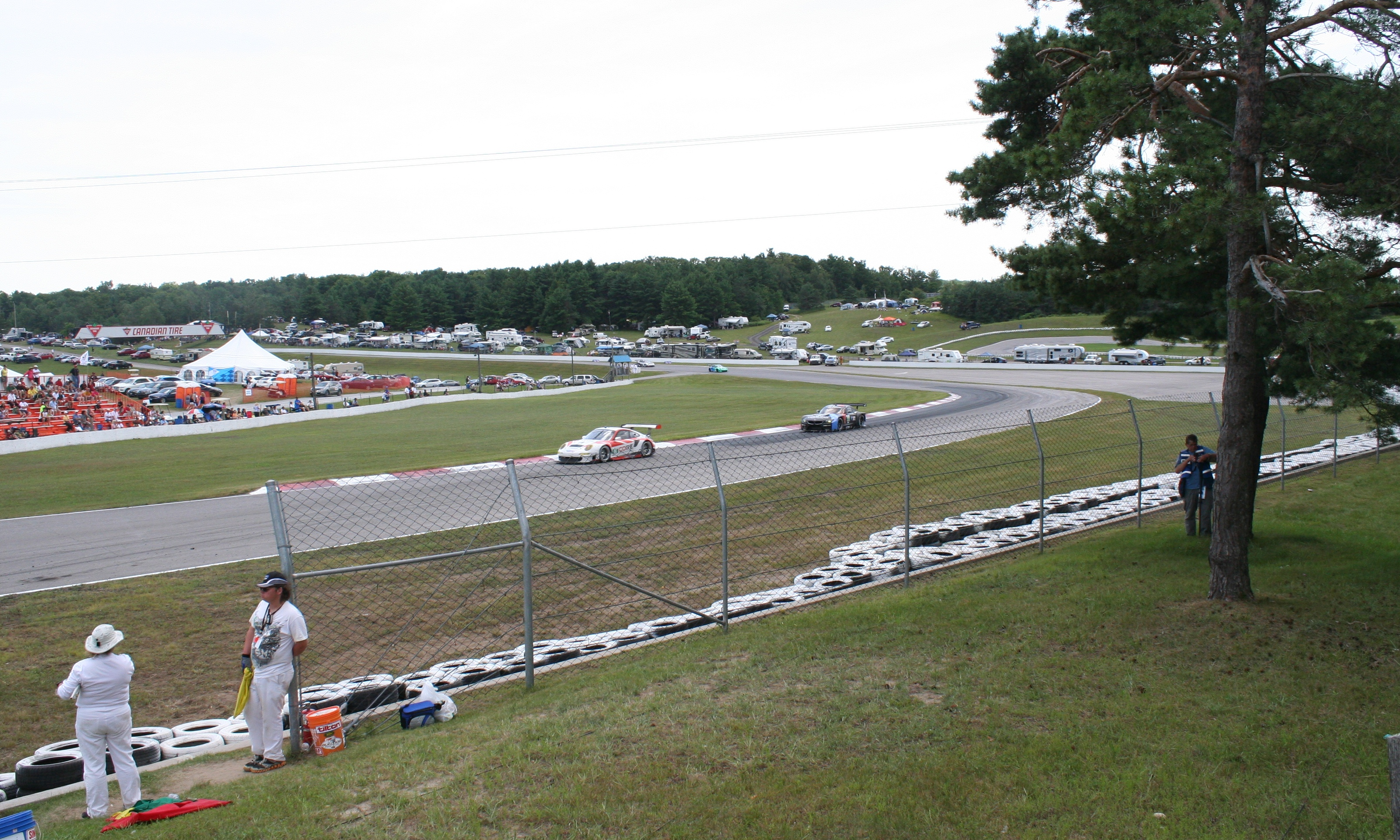
Turn 8 heading into The Esses

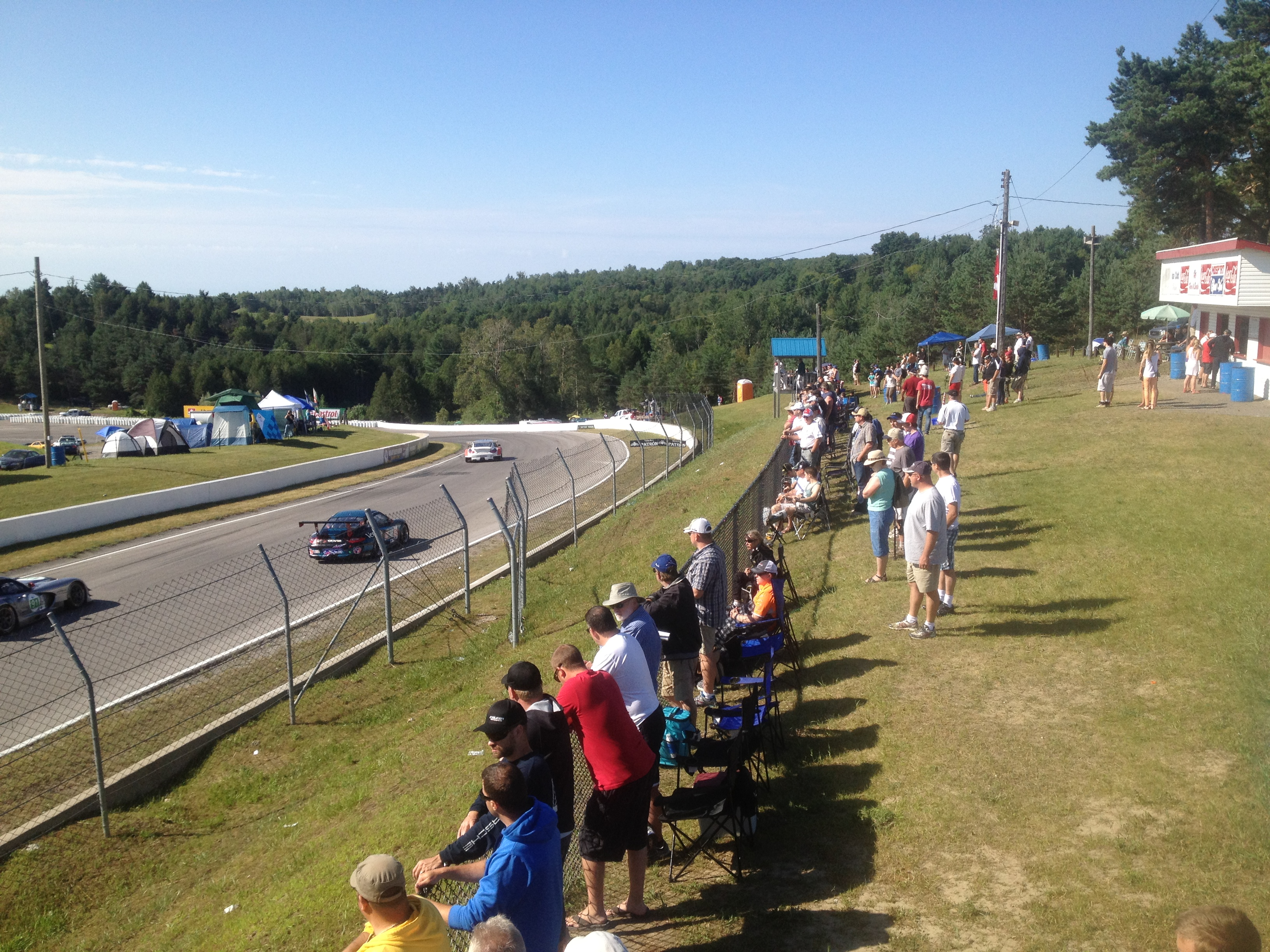
Entry into Clayton Corner - Turn 2

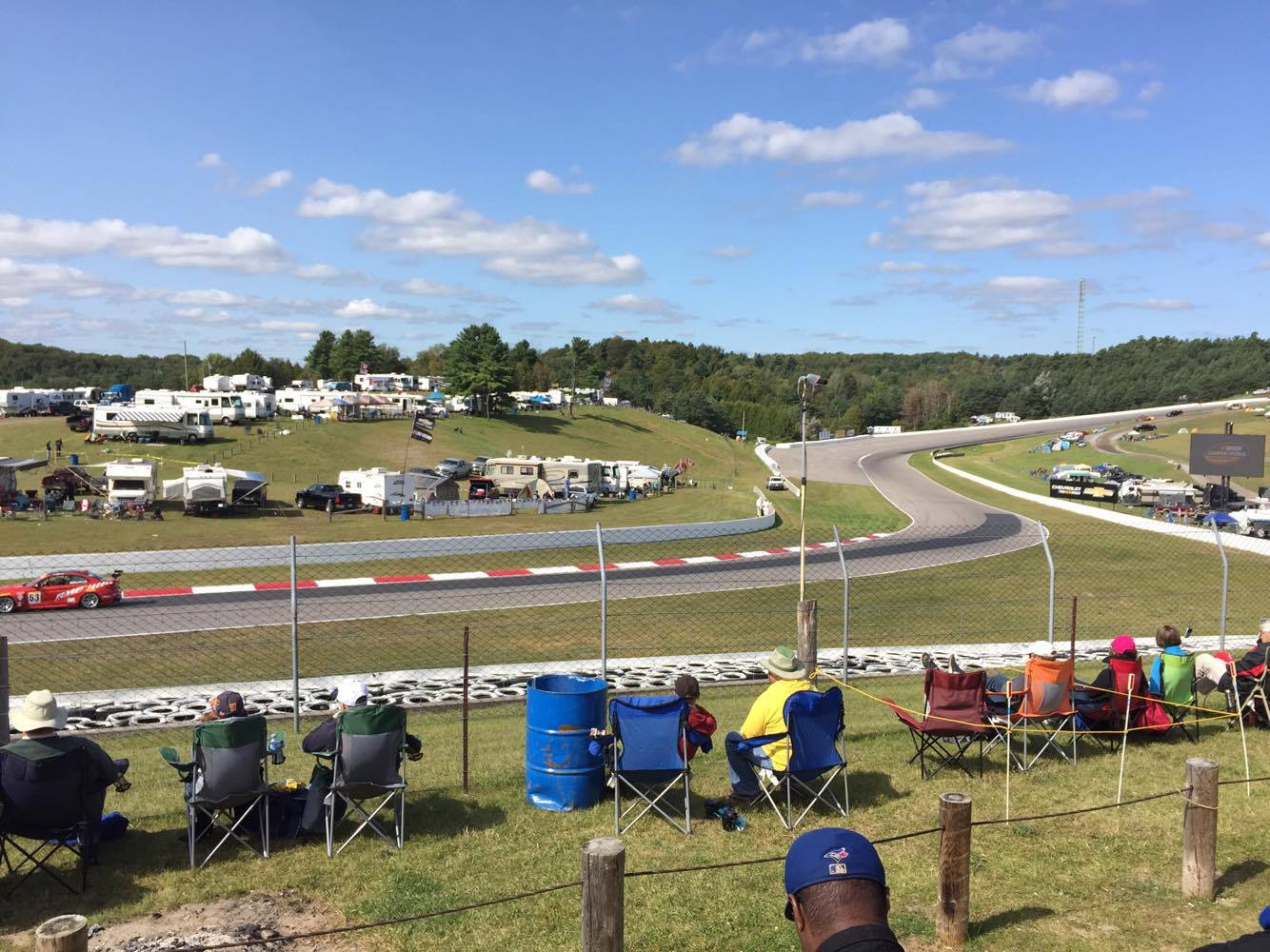
Outside of Turn 3

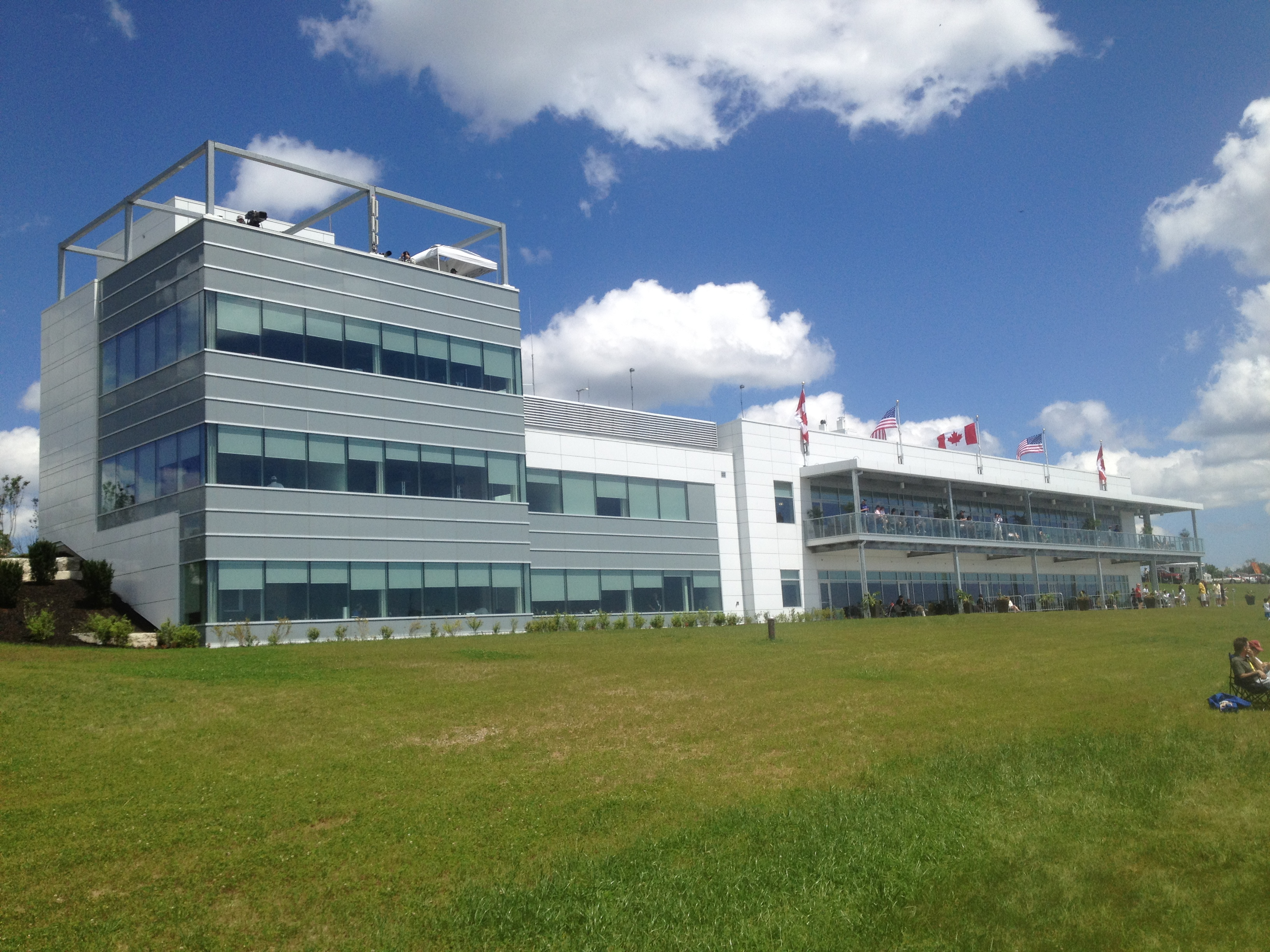
Event Centre

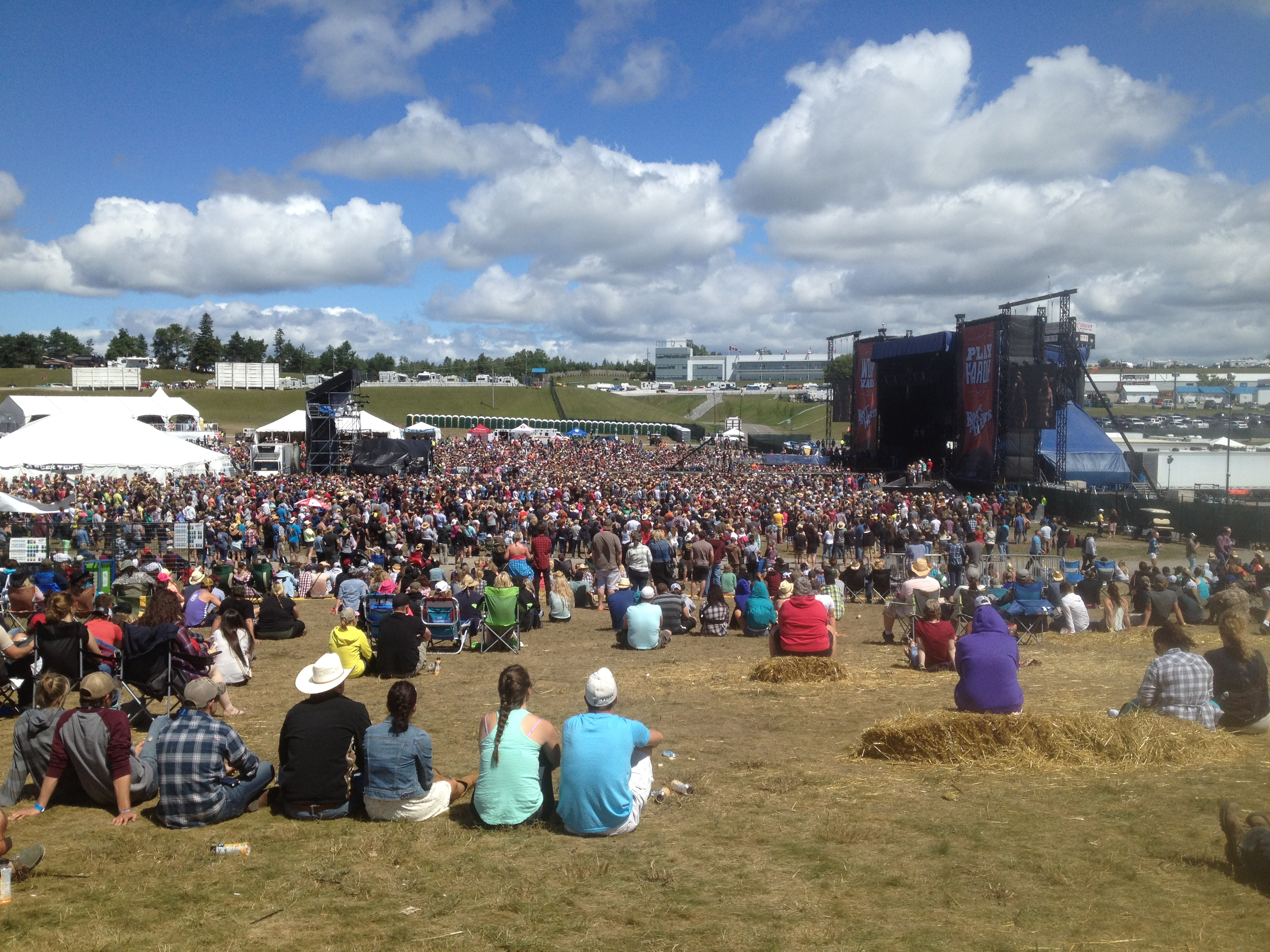
Track infield set up for a concert - Boots and Hearts Music Festival

== Lap records ==
The unofficial fastest ever recorded lap was taken by Rinaldo Capello, in an Audi R10 TDI, in qualifying for the 2008 Grand Prix of Mosport, with a time of 1:04.094. The official lap record was set in the race for that meeting with Capello's Audi Sport North America teammate Marco Werner lapping in a time of 1:05.823.

As of July 2026, the fastest official race lap records at Canadian Tire Motorsport Park (Mosport Park) for different classes are listed as:

Category	Time	Driver	Vehicle	Event
Grand Prix Circuit (1961–present): 3.957 km (2.459 mi)
LMP1	1:05.823	Marco Werner	Audi R10 TDI	2008 Grand Prix of Mosport
DPi	1:05.987	Tom Blomqvist	Acura ARX-05	2022 Chevrolet Grand Prix
LMP2	1:06.123	David Brabham	Acura ARX-01B	2008 Grand Prix of Mosport
LMDh	1:07.422	Alexander Sims	Cadillac V-Series.R	2023 Chevrolet Grand Prix
LMP900	1:08.444	Tom Kristensen	Audi R8	2002 Grand Prix of Mosport
LMP675	1:09.479	James Weaver	Lola EX257	2003 Grand Prix of Mosport
DP	1:10.200	Oswaldo Negri Jr.	Ligier JS P2	2015 SportsCar Grand Prix
LMPC	1:10.962	Colin Braun	Oreca FLM09	2013 SportsCar Grand Prix
Formula Atlantic	1:11.541	John Edwards	Swift 016.a	2009 Grand Prix of Mosport
Can-Am	1:11.875	Al Unser Jr.	Frissbee GR3	1982 Can-Am Challenge at Mosport Park
LMP3	1:11.763	Wyatt Brichacek	Ligier JS P325	2026 Mosport IMSA VP Racing SportsCar Challenge round
LMP	1:12.093	David Brabham	Panoz LMP-1 Roadster-S	1999 Grand Prix of Mosport
WSC	1:12.527	Andrea Montermini	Ferrari 333 SP	1997 Mosport Festival
Group C	1:12.915	Hans-Joachim Stuck	Porsche 962C	1985 1000 km of Mosport
F1	1:13.299	Mario Andretti	Lotus 78	1977 Canadian Grand Prix
GT1 (GTS)	1:13.867	Tomáš Enge	Aston Martin DBR9	2006 Grand Prix of Mosport
LM GTE	1:14.076	Earl Bamber	Porsche 911 RSR	2019 Mobil 1 SportsCar Grand Prix
F5000	1:14.149	Brian Redman	Lola T332	1975 Labatt's Blue 5000
Formula Regional	1:14.507	Nicolás Ambiado	Ligier JS F3	2025 Mosport Formula Regional Americas round
Group 7	1:14.600	George Follmer	Shadow DN4	1974 Labatt's Blue Can-Am
GT1 (Prototype)	1:14.685	David Brabham	Panoz GTR-1	1998 Mosport Festival
Star Mazda	1:15.321	Daniel di Leo	Star Formula Mazda 'Pro'	2004 Mosport Star Mazda Championship round
TA1	1:15.565	Chris Dyson	Ford Mustang Trans-Am	2024 Mosport Trans-Am round
GT3	1:15.771	Alexander Sims	Chevrolet Corvette Z06 GT3.R	2024 Chevrolet Grand Prix
GT	1:15.907	Maxime Martin	BMW Z4 GTE	2013 SportsCar Grand Prix
IMSA GTS	1:17.408	Steve Millen	Nissan 300ZX	1992 Mosport Grand Prix
Group 6	1:17.660	Jacky Ickx	Porsche 936	1976 Player's 200
IMSA GTO	1:18.396	Robby Gordon	Mercury Cougar XR-7	1990 Mosport Grand Prix
IMSA GTP	1:19.080	Al Holbert	March 83G	1983 Labatt's GT 6 Hour
Porsche Carrera Cup	1:19.780	Scott Hargrove	Porsche 911 (991 II) GT3 Cup	2017 1st Mosport Porsche GT3 Cup Challenge Canada round
Group 5 production cars	1:19.960	Danny Ongais	Porsche 935 K3/80	1980 Molson Canadian 1000
TA2	1:20.243	Tyler Gonzalez	Toyota Camry TA2	2025 Mosport Trans-Am round
GT2	1:20.288	Olivier Beretta	Dodge Viper GTS-R	1999 Grand Prix of Mosport
Formula 4	1:20.360	Daniel Quimby	Ligier JS F422	2024 Mosport F4 United States round
Superbike	1:20.652	Samuel Guerin	BMW M1000RR	2025 Mosport CSBK round
NASCAR Truck	1:21.276	Ross Chastain	Chevrolet Silverado	2019 Chevrolet Silverado 250
USF Juniors	1:21.4000	Karol Pasiewicz	Tatuus JR-23	2026 Mosport USF Juniors round
TO	1:21.965	Wally Dallenbach, Jr.	Chevrolet Camaro	1986 Budweiser 650
Sports 2000	1:22.076	Tony Cicale	Chevron B26	1976 Player's 200
TCR Touring Car	1:22.226	Dean Baker	Audi RS 3 LMS TCR (2021)	2024 1st Mosport Sports Car Championship Canada round
GT4	1:22.455	Robin Liddell	Chevrolet Camaro GT4.R	2023 Canadian Tire Motorsport Park 120
Formula BMW	1:22.458	James Kovacic	Mygale FB02	2009 Mosport Formula BMW Americas round
Supersport	1:23.236	Tomas Casas	Suzuki GSX-R750	2025 Mosport CSBK round
IMSA GTU	1:24.424	John Fergus	Dodge Daytona	1992 Mosport Grand Prix
IMSA GT3	1:25.486	Bill Auberlen	BMW M3 (E36)	1998 Mosport Festival
World SBK	1:25.781	Jamie James	Ducati 851 SBK	1990 Mosport World SBK round
IMSA AAC	1:25.796	Clay Young	Chevrolet Beretta	1991 Nissan Grand Prix of Mosport
Group 4	1:26.397	Kenper Miller	BMW M1	1981 Molson 1000
F1600	1:28.190	Mac Clark	Mygale SJ13	2020 4th Mosport Canadian F1600 round
Mazda MX-5 Cup	1:32.144	Helio Meza	Mazda MX-5 (ND)	2025 Mosport Mazda MX-5 Cup round
Sports car racing	1:34.200	Stirling Moss	Lotus 19	1961 Canadian Grand Prix
Group 5 touring car	1:34.200	Craig Fisher	Chevrolet Camaro Z28	1969 Mosport CTCC round
250cc	1:36.800	Mike Hailwood	Honda RC166	1967 Canadian motorcycle Grand Prix
Group 1	1:40.100	Maurice Carter	Chevrolet Camaro	1970 Can-Am Challenge Race for the Labatt's Blue Trophy
500cc	1:42.700	Mike Hailwood	Honda RC181	1967 Canadian motorcycle Grand Prix
125cc	1:45.900	Bill Ivy	Yamaha AS1	1967 Canadian motorcycle Grand Prix

== Former series and major race winners ==
=== FIA Formula One World Championship ===
Year	Race	Driver	Constructor	Report
1967	Player's Canadian Grand Prix	(Australia) Jack Brabham	Brabham-Repco	Report
1969	Player's Canadian Grand Prix	(Belgium) Jacky Ickx	Brabham-Ford	Report
1971	Player's Canadian Grand Prix	(United Kingdom) Jackie Stewart	Tyrrell-Ford	Report
1972	Labatt's Canadian Grand Prix	(United Kingdom) Jackie Stewart	Tyrrell-Ford	Report
1973	Labatt's Canadian Grand Prix	(United States) Peter Revson	McLaren-Ford	Report
1974	Labatt's Canadian Grand Prix	(Brazil) Emerson Fittipaldi	McLaren-Ford	Report
1976	Labatt's Canadian Grand Prix	(United Kingdom) James Hunt	McLaren-Ford	Report
1977	Labatt's Canadian Grand Prix	(South Africa) Jody Scheckter	Wolf-Ford	Report

=== FIA World Sportscar Championship ===
Year	Race	Drivers	Team	Car	Distance/Duration
1976	Player's 200 Weekend	(United Kingdom) Jackie Oliver	(United Kingdom) Shadow	Shadow DN4 Chevrolet	320 km (200 mi)
1977	Molson Diamond Can-Am Trans-Am Weekend	(Canada) Ludwig Heimrath (United States) Paul Miller	(Canada) Heimrath Racing	Porsche 934/5	6 hours
1980	Molson Canadian 1000	(United Kingdom) John Fitzpatrick (United Kingdom) Brian Redman	(United States) Dick Barbour Racing/Sachs USA	Porsche 935 K3/80	6 hours
1981	Molson 1000	(West Germany) Harald Grohs (West Germany) Rolf Stommelen	(West Germany) Andial Meister Racing	Porsche 935 K3	6 hours
1984	Budweiser GT	(Belgium) Jacky Ickx (West Germany) Jochen Mass	(West Germany) Rothmans Porsche	Porsche 956	1,000 km (620 mi)
1985	Budweiser GT	(West Germany) Hans-Joachim Stuck (West Germany) Derek Bell	(West Germany) Rothmans Porsche	Porsche 962C	1,000 km (620 mi)

=== USAC Championship Car (IndyCar) ===
Year	Race	Driver	Team	Chassis	Engine
1967	Telegram Trophy 200	(United States) Bobby Unser	Leader Cards Racing	Eagle	Ford
1968	Telegram Trophy 200	(United States) Dan Gurney	Oscar Olson	Eagle	Weslake-Ford
1977	Molson Diamond Indy	(United States) A. J. Foyt	A. J. Foyt Enterprises	Coyote	Foyt
1978	Molson Diamond Indy	(United States) Danny Ongais	Interscope Racing	Parnelli	Cosworth

=== FIM Road Racing World Championship ===
Year	Race	125 cc		250 cc		500 cc		Report
Year	Race	Rider	Manufacturer	Rider	Manufacturer	Rider	Manufacturer	Report
1967	Canadian motorcycle Grand Prix	(United Kingdom) Bill Ivy	Yamaha	(United Kingdom) Mike Hailwood	Honda	(United Kingdom) Mike Hailwood	Honda	Report

=== FIM Formula 750 World Championship ===
Year	Race	Winning rider	Manufacturer
1977	Molson Diamond Motorcycle Grand Prix of Canada	(Australia) Gregg Hansford	Kawasaki
1978	Molson Diamond Motorcycle Grand Prix of Canada	(United States) Michael Baldwin	Yamaha
1979	Molson Diamond Motorcycle Grand Prix of Canada	(France) Patrick Pons	Yamaha

=== FIM World Superbike Championship ===
Year		Race	Date	Winning rider	Winning team
1989	Race 1	Rothman's Superbike	June 4	(United States) Fred Merkel	Team Rumi RCM
1989	Race 2	Rothman's Superbike	June 4	(Italy) Giancarlo Falappa	Bimota SpA
1990	Race 1	Bud Superbike	June 3	(France) Raymond Roche	Squadra Corse Ducati Lucchinelli
1990	Race 2	Bud Superbike	June 3	(France) Raymond Roche	Squadra Corse Ducati Lucchinelli
1991	Race 1		June 2	(Canada) Pascal Picotte	Fast Yamaha/Sunoco
1991	Race 2		June 2	(United States) Tom Kipp	Wiseco Piston Yamaha

=== FIM Motocross World Championship ===
Year	Class	Driver	Manufacturer
1976	500cc	(Netherlands) Gerrit Wolsink	Suzuki
1977	125cc	(Belgium) André Massant	Yamaha
1979	500cc	(Netherlands) Gerrit Wolsink	Suzuki

=== Canadian Sports Car Championship ===
Year	Date	Race	Driver	Team	Car
1961	June 10	BEMC Trophy	(Canada) Ludwig Heimrath Sr.	Eglinton Caledonia Motors	Porsche 718 RS 60
1961	June 24	Player's 200	(United Kingdom) Stirling Moss	United Dominions Corp.	Lotus 19 Monte Carlo Climax
1961	Aug 5	Grand Valley Car Club Trophy	(Canada) Ludwig Heimrath Sr.	Eglinton Caledonia Motors	Porsche 718 RS 60
1961	Sep 9	BEMC Indian Summer Trophy	(Canada) Harry Entwistle	Hamilton Racing Partnership	Lotus 15 Climax
1961	Sep 30	Canadian Grand Prix	(Canada) Peter Ryan	Comstock Racing Team	Lotus 19 Monte Carlo Climax
1962	June 9	Player's 200	(United States) Masten Gregory	United Dominions-Laystall	Lotus 19 Climax
1962	Sep 8	BEMC Indian Summer Races	(Canada) John Cannon		Dailu Bardahl Special
1962	Sep 22	Canadian Grand Prix	(United States) Masten Gregory	U.D.T./Laystall	Lotus 19 Climax
1963	18 May	BEMC Spring Trophy Races	(Canada) John Cannon		Dailu Mk II Ford
1963	June 1	Player's 200	(United States) Chuck Daigh	Arciero Bros. Racing Team	Lotus 19 Climax
1963	June 16	Grand National Races	(Canada) Dennis Coad	Whiz Car Care Products	Lotus 19 Climax
1963	Sep 28	Canadian Grand Prix	(Mexico) Pedro Rodriguez	North American Racing Team	Ferrari 250 P
1964	June 6	Player's 200 – Race No. 1	(New Zealand) Bruce McLaren	Bruce McLaren Racing Ltd.	Zerex Special Oldsmobile Traco V8
1964	June 6	Player's 200 – Race No. 2	(New Zealand) Bruce McLaren	Bruce McLaren Racing Ltd.	Zerex Special Oldsmobile Traco V8
1964	June 21	Spring Trophy Races	(Canada) Ludwig Heimrath Sr.	Canadian Comstock Ltd.	Cooper Monaco T61 Ford
1964	Sep 27	Canadian Grand Prix	(Mexico) Pedro Rodriguez	North American Racing Team	Ferrari 330 P
1965	June 6	Player's 200	(United Kingdom) John Surtees	Team Surtees	Lola T70 Mk 2 Chevrolet V8
1965	June 19	Spring Trophy Race	(Canada) Ludwig Heimrath Sr.	Heimrath Racing/Keating Ford	McLaren Elva Mark I Ford V8
1965	Sep 4	Indian Summer Trophy Races	(Canada) Ludwig Heimrath Sr.	Heimrath Racing/Keating Ford	McLaren Elva Mark I Ford V8
1965	Sep 25	Canadian Grand Prix	(United States) Jim Hall	Chaparral Cars Inc.	Chaparral 2A Chevrolet
1966	June 5	Player's 200	(New Zealand) Bruce McLaren	Bruce McLaren Racing Ltd.	McLaren Elva Mark IIB Ford
1967	June 3	BEMC Spring Trophy Races	(Canada) Ross de St.-Croix	Eustache Soucy	McLaren Elva Mark II Chevrolet
1967	Oct 9	Wm. Cleland Memorial Trophy	(Canada) John Cordts		McLaren Elva Mark III Chevrolet
1968	19 May	BARC Ontario Region Races	(Canada) John Cordts		McLaren Elva Mark III Chevrolet
1968	Sep 7	BEMC Indian Summer Trophy Races	(Canada) Roger McCaig	McCaig racing	McLaren M6B Chevrolet

=== USAC Stock Car ===
Year	Date	Race title	Driver	Team	Car
1962	June 23	Peterborough International	(United States) Rodger Ward		1962 Pontiac
1962	June 23	Peterborough International	(United States) Paul Goldsmith		1962 Pontiac Catalina
1966	July 30	Coca-Cola/Kawartha 250	(United States) Don White	Ray Nichels	1966 Dodge Charger
1966	July 30	Coca-Cola/Kawartha 250	(United States) Sal Tovella	Sal's Auto Sales	1965 Plymouth
1967	July 29	Bardahl/Kawartha 250	(United States) Mario Andretti	Holman Moody	1967 Ford
1967	July 29	Bardahl/Kawartha 250	(United States) Parnelli Jones	Holman Moody	1967 Ford Fairlane
1968	July 20	CHUM/Mosport 250	(United States) Roger McCluskey	Norm Nelson	1967 Plymouth
1968	July 20	CHUM/Mosport 250	(United States) Al Unser Sr.	R/A Hoerr Inc.	1968 Dodge Charger
1978	June 10	Molson Diamond USAC Stock Cars	(United States) A. J. Foyt	A. J. Foyt	Chevrolet Camaro

=== SCCA Formula 5000 ===
Year	Race	Driver	Chassis	Engine
1968	Mosport Continental	(United States) Lou Sell	Eagle Mk 5	Chevrolet V8
1969	Mac's Mosport Continental	(Canada) John Cannon	Eagle Mk 5	Chevrolet V8
1970	Mac's Mosport Continental	(United States) Mark Donohue	Lola T192	Chevrolet V8
1974	Labatt's Blue 5000 Weekend	(United Kingdom) David Hobbs	Lola T332	Chevrolet V8
1975	Labatt's Blue 5000 Weekend	(United States) Mario Andretti	Lola T332	Chevrolet V8
1976	Labatt's Blue 5000 Weekend	(Australia) Alan Jones	Lola T332	Chevrolet V8

=== Atlantic Championship ===
Year	Date	Driver
1974	June 30	(Canada) Bill Brack
1975	July 20	(United States) Elliott Forbes-Robinson
1976	Aug 22	(United States) Bobby Rahal
1977	22 May	(United States) Price Cobb
1979	Aug 19	(United States) Kevin Cogan
1981	June 13	(Canada) Jacques Villeneuve
1982	June 5	(United States) Whitney Ganz
1982	Sep 12	(United States) Whitney Ganz
1983	Sep 11	(Brazil) Roberto Moreno
1987	June 7	(United Kingdom) Calvin Fish
1988	June 19	(New Zealand) Colin Trueman
1989	June 25	(United States) Jocko Cunningham
1992	Sep 20	(Canada) David Empringham
1993	June 20	(Canada) Claude Bourbonnais
1994	22 May	(United States) Greg Ray
2009	Aug 30	(United States) Jonathan Summerton

=== Formula Super Vee Championship ===
Year	Date	Driver
1974	Sep 22	(United States) Elliott Forbes-Robinson
1975	Sep 21	(United States) Eddie Miller
1976	June 20	(United States) Bill Henderson
1977	Oct 9	(United States) Bob Lazier
1979	June 3	(Australia) Geoff Brabham
1982	Sep 12	(United States) Michael Andretti
1983	June 5	(United States) Price Cobb

=== USAC National Sprint Car Series ===
Year	Date	Race	Driver
1989	Sep 17	USAC Canadian Sprint Car Nationals	(United States) Gary Fedewa
1989	Sep 17	USAC Canadian Sprint Car Nationals	(United States) Wayne Hammond

== Music events ==
Mosport has also been the venue of a number of concerts and music festivals such as:

- Strawberry Fields Festival, August 7–9, 1970
- Canada Jam, August 26, 1978
- Heatwave Festival, August 23, 1980
- Edenfest, July 12–14, 1996
- Boots and Hearts Music Festival, August 10–12, 2012, August 2–4, 2013, July 31 – August 3, 2014

== See also ==
- List of auto racing tracks in Canada
