= Chevrolet Grand Prix =

Sports car race held in Ontario, Canada

Coordinates: 44°03′00″N 78°40′40″W

IMSA WeatherTech SportsCar Championship
- Venue: Canadian Tire Motorsport Park
- Corporate sponsor: Chevrolet
- First race: 1975
- First WSCC race: 2014
- Duration: 2 hours 40 minutes
- Previous names: Mosport 6 Hours, Mosport 1000, Mosport 500, Mosport Festival, Grand Prix of Mosport, Mobil 1 SportsCar Grand Prix
- Most wins (driver): Lucas Luhr (5)
- Most wins (team): Audi Sport North America (6)
- Most wins (manufacturer): Porsche (8)

The Chevrolet Grand Prix is an annual IMSA WeatherTech SportsCar Championship race held every July at Canadian Tire Motorsport Park near Bowmanville in Clarington, Ontario, Canada. The race originated in 1975 and is currently a two-hour and forty minute race in order to fit the event into a television-friendly package. Previous editions of the Grand Prix were part of the World Sportscar Championship, the American Le Mans Series and the IMSA GT Championship.

== History ==
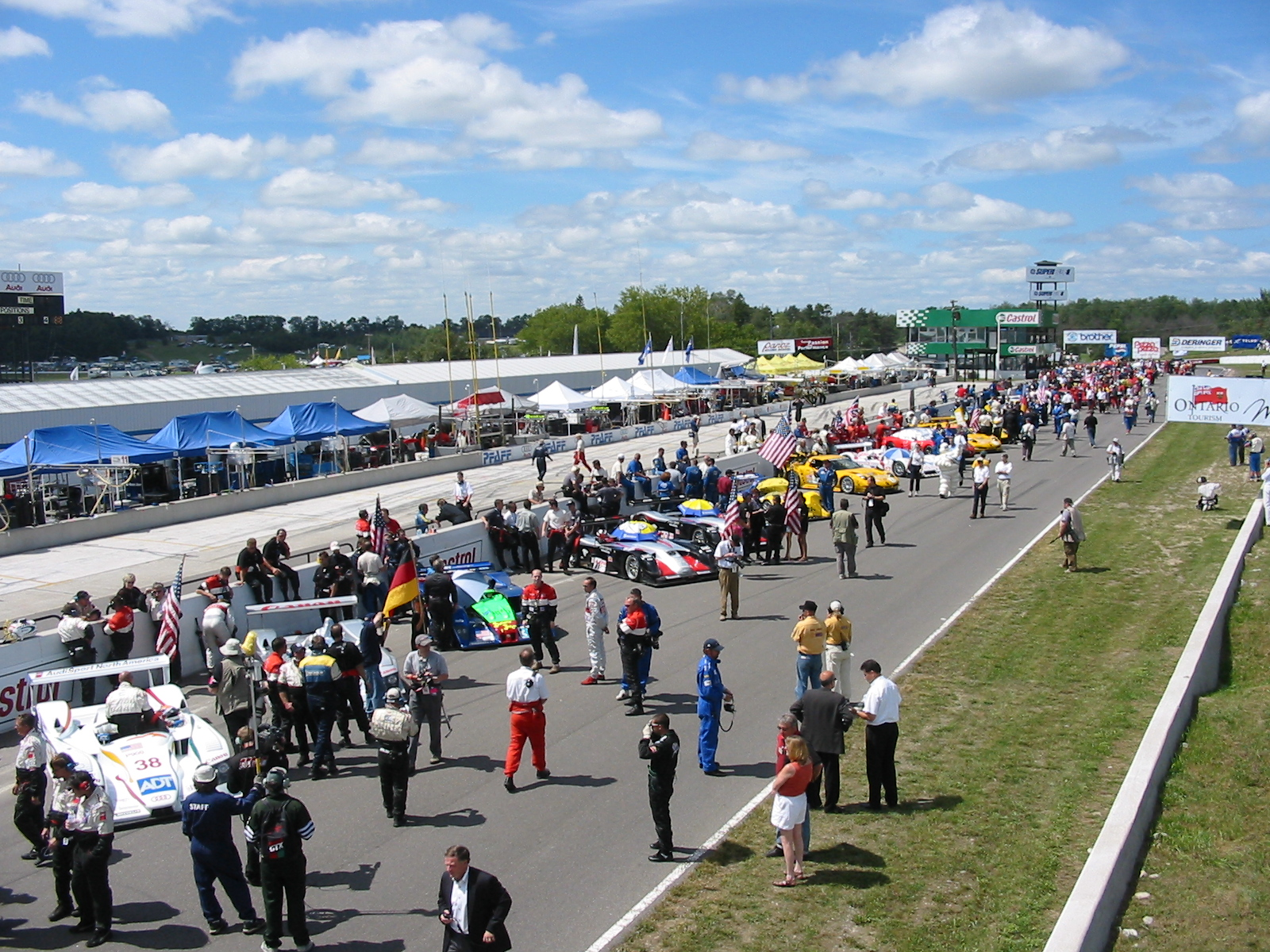
2003 Grand Prix of Mosport grid

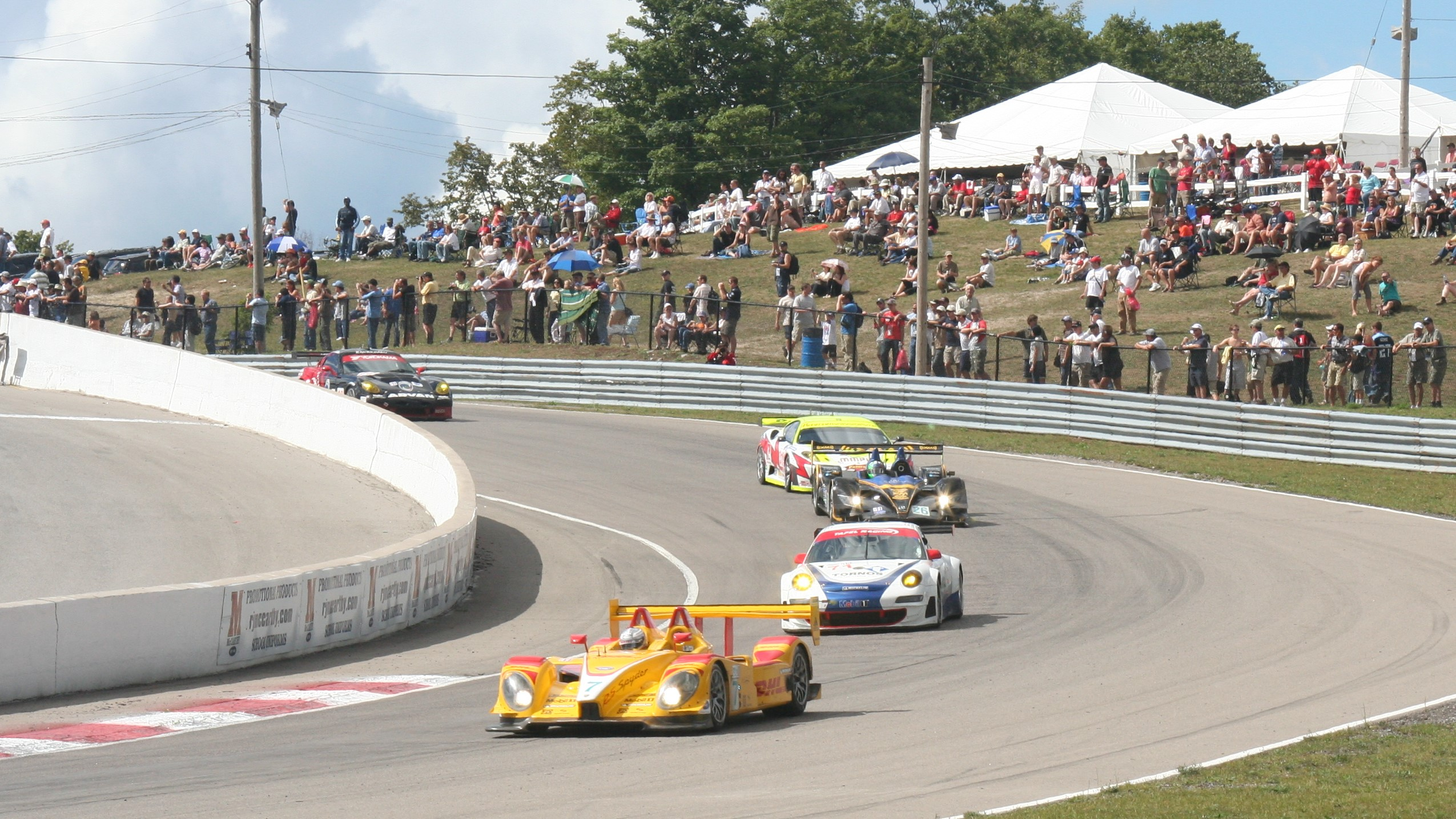
2007 Grand Prix of Mosport

In 1961 the first international professional sportscar races at Mosport Park took place with the inaugural Players 200 in June won by Stirling Moss and the first Canadian Grand Prix won by Peter Ryan in September as part of the Canadian Sportscar Championship. In 1966 the Grand Prix became part of the inaugural Can-Am Series season before becoming a Formula One Grand Prix in 1967. The Mosport Can-Am races continued to be part of the Can-Am series through to its demise in 1986 with the track hosting more Can-Am races than any other facility.

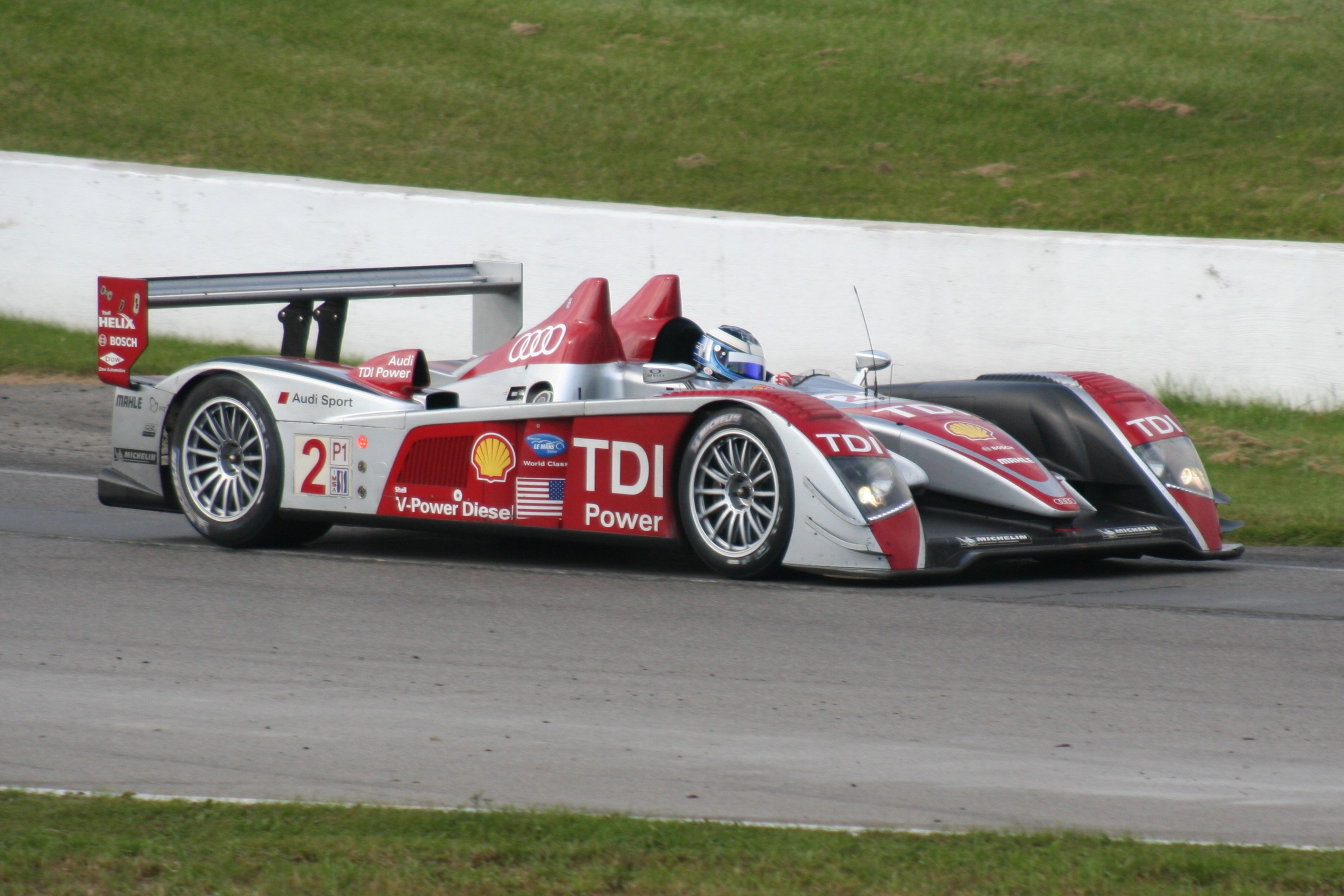
Audi Sport North America has the most wins by a team with 6 victories.

In 1975, the International Motor Sports Association sportscars visited the track for the first time when its Camel GT Challenge raced during the Labatt's Blue 5000 Weekend sharing the weekend schedule with the SCCA/USAC Formula 5000 Championship. The inaugural 100 mile IMSA race was won by Hurley Haywood in a Porsche Carrera.

The race was included as part of the World Sports Car Championship on six occasions, for the first time in 1976 and for the final time as the 1985 Mosport 1000 which also marked the final FIA World Championship event to be held at the facility.

From 1989 through 1992, IMSA returned to headline GT only races in May and June for their GTO and GTU classes. With the launch of the new World Sports Cars category in 1995, prototypes returned to the track for the first time in a decade for the Chrysler Mosport 500.

In August of 1999, the American Le Mans Series made its first appearance at the track as the new headline IMSA sanctioned series for the renamed Grand Prix of Mosport weekend.

The series reintroduced factory backed prototypes designed for the high speeds of the 24 Hours of Le Mans. Prototypes from Audi, BMW, Cadillac, Panoz, Porsche and Acura led to the highest speeds ever recorded at the track. The 2008 Grand Prix of Mosport included the fastest ever lap at the circuit taken by Rinaldo Capello during qualifying in an Audi R10 TDI with a time of 1:04.094.

Mosport was one of four tracks that would appear on the American Le Mans Series schedule every year for the next fifteen years of the series existence.

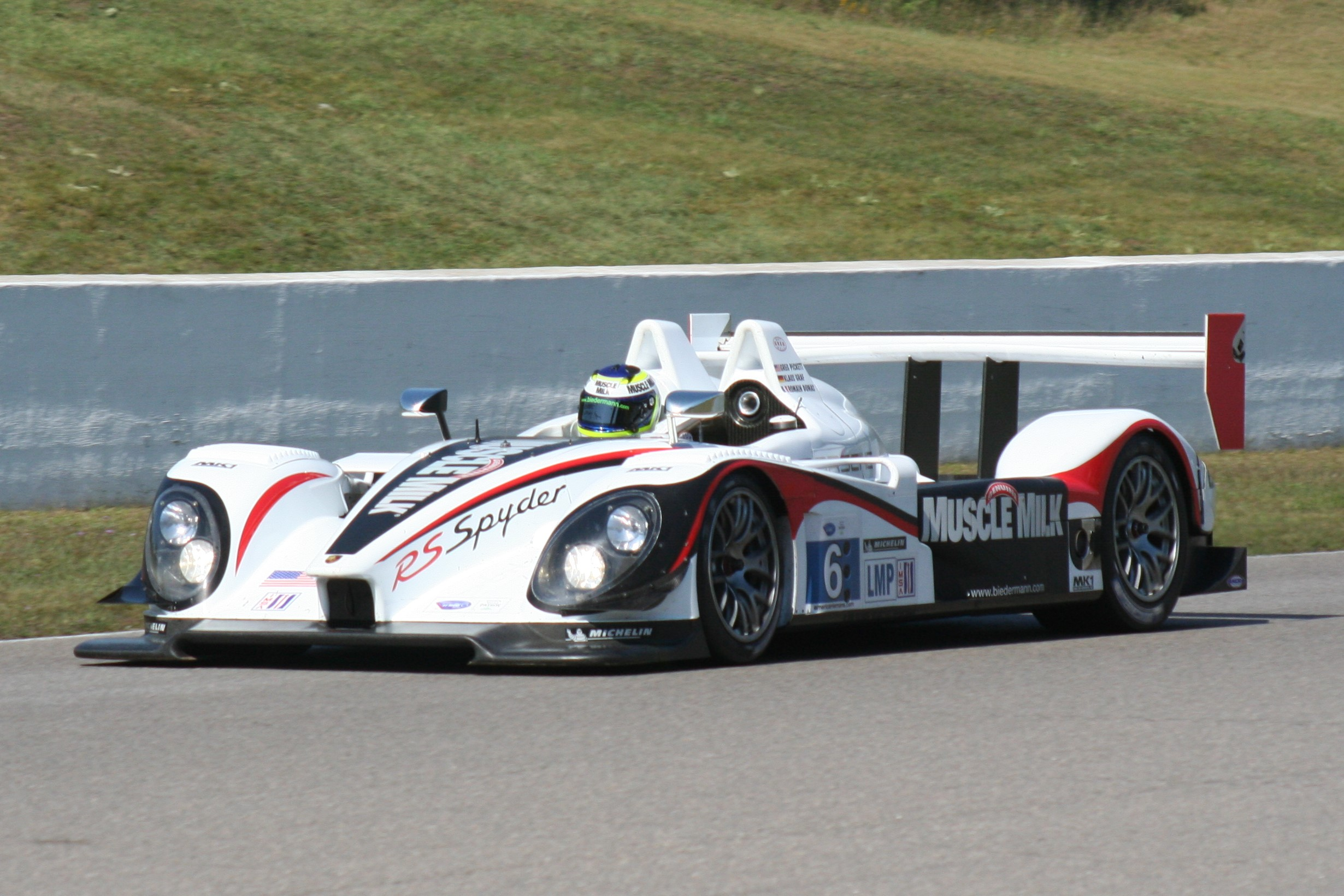
Porsche has the most victories by a manufacturer with 8 overall wins.

In 2014, the Grand Prix continued as part of the new IMSA WeatherTech SportsCar Championship following the merger of the American Le Mans Series and the Grand-Am Rolex Sports Car Series.

In 2020 and 2021, the Grand Prix was not held for the first time in a quarter of a century due to the COVID-19 pandemic.

== Winners ==
Year	Date	Drivers	Team	Car	Distance/Duration	Race title	Report
IMSA GT Championship
1975	June 14	(United States) Hurley Haywood	(United States) G.W. Dickinson	Porsche Carrera	100 miles (160 km)	Labatt's Blue 5000 Weekend	Report
World Sports Car Championship
1976	Aug 22	(United Kingdom) Jackie Oliver	(United Kingdom) Shadow	Shadow DN4-Chevrolet	200 miles (320 km)	Player's 200 Weekend	Report
1977	Aug 20	(Canada) Ludwig Heimrath (United States) Paul Miller	(Canada) Heimrath Racing	Porsche 934/5	6 hours	Molson Diamond Can-Am Trans-Am Weekend	Report
1978–1979	Not held						
World Sportscar Championship & IMSA GT Championship
1980	Aug 17	(United Kingdom) John Fitzpatrick (United Kingdom) Brian Redman	(United States) Dick Barbour Racing/Sachs USA	Porsche 935 K3/80	6 hours	Molson Canadian 1000	Report
1981	Aug 16	(West Germany) Harald Grohs (West Germany) Rolf Stommelen	(West Germany) Andial Meister Racing	Porsche 935 K3	6 hours	Molson 1000	Report
IMSA GT Championship
1982	Aug 15	(United States) John Paul Jr. (United States) John Paul Sr.	(United States) JLP Racing	Porsche 935 JLP-3	6 hours	Labatt's 50 GT	Report
1983	Aug 14	(United States) Bob Tullius (Canada) Bill Adam	(United States) Group 44	Jaguar XJR-5	6 hours	Labatt's GT	Report
World Sportscar Championship
1984	Aug 5	(Belgium) Jacky Ickx (West Germany) Jochen Mass	(West Germany) Rothmans Porsche	Porsche 956	1,000 km (620 mi)	Budweiser GT	Report
1985	Aug 11	(West Germany) Hans-Joachim Stuck (United Kingdom) Derek Bell	(West Germany) Rothmans Porsche	Porsche 962C	1,000 km (620 mi)	Budweiser GT	Report
1986–1988	Not held						
IMSA GT Championship
1989	June 25	(United States) Pete Halsmer	(United States) Roush Racing	Mercury Cougar XR-7	500 km (310 mi) (GTO/GTU/AC only)	The Audi Quattro IMSA Weekend	Report
1990	June 24	(New Zealand) Steve Millen	(United States) Cunningham Racing	Nissan 300ZX	300 km (190 mi) (GTO/GTU/AAC only)	The Nissan Grand Prix	Report
1991	May 20	(United States) Pete Halsmer	(Japan) Mazda Motorsports	Mazda RX-7	300 km (190 mi) (GTO/GTU/AAC only)	The Nissan Grand Prix	Report
1992	May 18	(Canada) Jeremy Dale	(United States) Cunningham Racing	Nissan 300ZX	2 hours (GTS/GTO/GTU only)	The Nissan Grand Prix	Report
1993–1994	Not held						
1995	Aug 13	(United Kingdom) Andy Wallace (United Kingdom) James Weaver	(United States) Dyson Racing	Riley & Scott Mk III-Ford	3 Hours	Chrysler Mosport 500	Report
1996	Aug 25	(United States) Butch Leitzinger (United States) John Paul Jr.	(United States) Dyson Racing	Riley & Scott Mk III-Ford	3 Hours	Chrysler Mosport 500	Report
1997	Aug 31	(Canada) Ron Fellows (United States) Rob Morgan	(United States) Central Arkansas Racing	Ferrari 333 SP	2 Hours	Mosport Festival	Report
1998	Aug 9	(United States) Butch Leitzinger (United Kingdom) James Weaver	(United States) Dyson Racing	Riley & Scott Mk III-Ford	2 hours, 45 minutes	Mosport Festival	Report
American Le Mans Series
1999	June 27	(Denmark) Jan Magnussen (United States) Johnny O'Connell	(United States) Panoz Motor Sports	Panoz LMP-1 Roadster-S	2 hours, 45 minutes	The Grand Prix at Mosport	Report
2000	Aug 6	(Italy) Rinaldo Capello (United Kingdom) Allan McNish	(Germany) Audi Sport North America	Audi R8	2 hours, 45 minutes	The globemegawheels.com Grand Prix at Mosport	Report
2001	Aug 19	(Germany) Frank Biela (Italy) Emanuele Pirro	(Germany) Audi Sport North America	Audi R8	2 hours, 45 minutes	Gran Turismo 3 Grand Prix at Mosport	Report
2002	Aug 18	(Italy) Rinaldo Capello (Denmark) Tom Kristensen	(Germany) Audi Sport North America	Audi R8	2 hours, 45 minutes	Grand Prix at Mosport sponsored by mail2web.com	Report
2003	Aug 17	(Germany) Frank Biela (Germany) Marco Werner	(Germany) Infineon Team Joest	Audi R8	2 hours, 45 minutes	The Toronto Grand Prix of Mosport	Report
2004	Aug 8	(United States) Butch Leitzinger (United Kingdom) James Weaver	(United States) Dyson Racing	MG-Lola EX257	2 hours, 45 minutes	The Toronto Grand Prix of Mosport	Report
2005	Sept 4	(United States) Butch Leitzinger (United Kingdom) James Weaver	(United States) Dyson Racing	MG-Lola EX257	2 hours, 45 minutes	Labour Day Weekend Grand Prix of Mosport	Report
2006	Sept 3	(Italy) Rinaldo Capello (United Kingdom) Allan McNish	(Germany) Audi Sport North America	Audi R10 TDI	2 hours, 45 minutes	Mobil 1 presents the Labour Day Weekend Grand Prix of Mosport	Report
2007	Aug 26	(France) Romain Dumas (Germany) Timo Bernhard	(United States) Penske Racing	Porsche RS Spyder Evo	2 hours, 45 minutes	Mobil 1 presents the Grand Prix of Mosport	Report
2008	Aug 24	(Germany) Lucas Luhr (Germany) Marco Werner	(Germany) Audi Sport North America	Audi R10 TDI	2 hours, 45 minutes	Mobil 1 presents the Grand Prix of Mosport	Report
2009	Aug 30	(Australia) David Brabham (United States) Scott Sharp	(United States) Patrón Highcroft Racing	Acura ARX-02a	2 hours, 45 minutes	Mobil 1 presents the Grand Prix of Mosport	Report
2010	Aug 29	(France) Romain Dumas (Germany) Klaus Graf	(United States) Muscle Milk Team Cytosport	Porsche RS Spyder Evo	2 hours, 45 minutes	Mobil 1 presents the Grand Prix of Mosport	Report
2011	July 24	(Germany) Klaus Graf (Germany) Lucas Luhr	(United States) Muscle Milk Aston Martin Racing	Lola-Aston Martin B08/62	2 hours, 45 minutes	Mobil 1 presents the Grand Prix of Mosport	Report
2012	July 22	(Germany) Klaus Graf (Germany) Lucas Luhr	(United States) Muscle Milk Pickett Racing	HPD ARX-03a	2 hours, 45 minutes	Mobil 1 presents the Grand Prix of Mosport	Report
2013	July 21	(Germany) Klaus Graf (Germany) Lucas Luhr	(United States) Muscle Milk Pickett Racing	HPD ARX-03c	2 hours, 45 minutes	Mobil 1 SportsCar Grand Prix	Report
IMSA WeatherTech SportsCar Championship
2014	July 13	(France) Olivier Pla (Colombia) Gustavo Yacamán	(France) OAK Racing	Morgan LMP2-Nissan	2 hours, 45 minutes	Mobil 1 SportsCar Grand Prix	Report
2015	July 12	(United States) Jordan Taylor (United States) Ricky Taylor	(United States) Wayne Taylor Racing	Dallara Corvette DP	2 hours, 40 minutes	Mobil 1 SportsCar Grand Prix	Report
2016	July 10	(United States) Dane Cameron (United States) Eric Curran	(United States) Whelen Engineering Racing	Coyote Corvette DP	2 hours, 40 minutes	Mobil 1 SportsCar Grand Prix	Report
2017	July 9	(United States) Dane Cameron (United States) Eric Curran	(United States) Whelen Engineering Racing	Cadillac DPi-V.R	2 hours, 40 minutes	Mobil 1 SportsCar Grand Prix	Report
2018	July 8	(United States) Colin Braun (United States) Jon Bennett	(United States) CORE Autosport	Oreca 07-Gibson	2 hours, 40 minutes	Mobil 1 SportsCar Grand Prix	Report
2019	July 7	(United Kingdom) Oliver Jarvis (United States) Tristan Nunez	(Germany) Mazda Team Joest	Mazda RT24-P	2 hours, 40 minutes	Mobil 1 SportsCar Grand Prix	Report
2020–2021	Canceled due to the COVID-19 pandemic						
2022	July 3	(Netherlands) Renger van der Zande (France) Sébastien Bourdais	(United States) Cadillac Racing	Cadillac DPi-V.R	2 hours, 40 minutes	Chevrolet Grand Prix	Report
2023	July 9	(United Kingdom) Tom Blomqvist (United States) Colin Braun	(United States) Meyer Shank Racing with Curb-Agajanian	Acura ARX-06	2 hours, 40 minutes	Chevrolet Grand Prix	Report
2024	July 14	(United States) Nick Boulle (France) Tom Dillmann	(Poland) Inter Europol by PR1/Mathiasen Motorsports	Oreca 07-Gibson	2 hours, 40 minutes	Chevrolet Grand Prix	Report
2025	July 13	(United States) Dane Cameron (United States) P. J. Hyett	(United States) AO Racing	Oreca 07-Gibson	2 hours, 40 minutes	Chevrolet Grand Prix	Report
2026	July 12	(United States) Jeremy Clarke (France) Tom Dillmann	(Poland) Inter Europol Competition	Oreca 07-Gibson	2 hours, 40 minutes	Chevrolet Grand Prix	Report

== See also ==
- Chevrolet Silverado 250
- Mosport 200
- Mosport Can-Am
- Mosport Trans-Am
- Canadian Grand Prix
- Canadian Motorcycle Grand Prix
- Telegraph Trophy 200 / Molson Diamond Indy
