= Road Atlanta =

Car racing track in Georgia, US

Michelin Raceway Road Atlanta
- Circuit Logo (2018–present)

- Grand Prix Circuit (1998–present)
- Location: Hall County, Georgia
- Coordinates: 34°8′48″N 83°49′4″W
- FIA Grade: 2
- Owner: NASCAR via IMSA Holdings, LLC (September 2012–present); Don Panoz (November 1996–August 2012); Frank Drendel, Jim Kanely, Eddie Edwards, George Nuse, and Bill Waddell (1993–October 1996); Whittington Brothers (1978–1992); David Sloyer, Earl Walker, and Arthur Montgomery (1969–1977)
- Broke ground: 1969
- Opened: September 13, 1970; 56 years ago
- Former names: Road Atlanta (1970–2018)
- Major events: Current: IMSA WeatherTech SportsCar Championship; Petit Le Mans (1998–present); Grand Prix of Atlanta (1973–1992, 1994–1999, 2003, 2005, 2013, 2020); MotoAmerica (1980, 1987, 1989–1990, 1998–2010, 2012, 2015–present); Trans-Am Series (1972–1973, 1982, 1984, 1986–1987, 1989–1990, 1993–1995, 1999, 2002, 2009–present); GT World Challenge America (1990, 1993–1995, 1999–2009, 2011, 2026); Future: SCCA Runoffs (1970–1993, 2027–2028); Former: NASCAR Busch Series (1986–1987); Can-Am Road Atlanta Can-Am (1970–1974, 1978–1980, 1982, 1984)
- Website: http://www.roadatlanta.com/

Grand Prix Circuit (1998–present)
- Surface: Asphalt
- Length: 2.540 mi (4.088 km)
- Turns: 12
- Race lap record: 1:07.056 ( (Austria) Christian Klien, Peugeot 908 HDi FAP, 2008, LMP1)

Motorcycle Circuit (2008–present)
- Surface: Asphalt
- Length: 2.550 mi (4.104 km)
- Turns: 12
- Race lap record: 1:23.828 ( (United States) Jake Gagne, Yamaha YZF-R1, 2023, SBK)

Motorcycle Circuit (2003–2007)
- Surface: Asphalt
- Length: 2.548 mi (4.100 km)
- Turns: 12
- Race lap record: 1:20.731 ( (Australia) Mat Mladin, Suzuki GSX-R1000, 2007, SBK)

Original Circuit (1970–1997)
- Surface: Asphalt
- Length: 2.520 mi (4.055 km)
- Turns: 12
- Race lap record: 1:08.639 ( (United States) Davy Jones, Jaguar XJR-14, 1992, IMSA GTP)

Road Atlanta (known for sponsorship reasons as Michelin Raceway Road Atlanta) is a 2.540 mi (4.088 km) road course located just north of Braselton, Georgia, United States. The facility is utilized for a wide variety of events, including professional and amateur sports car and motorcycle races, racing and driving schools, corporate programs and testing for motorsports teams. The track has 12 turns, including the famous "esses" between turns three and five; and Turn 12, a downhill, diving turn. The track is owned by IMSA Holdings, LLC through its subsidiary Road Atlanta, LLC, and is the home to the Petit Le Mans, as well as AMA motorcycle racing, and smaller events throughout the year. Michelin acquired naming rights to the facility in 2018.

== History ==
Generic logo (used since 1998)

In 1969, David Sloyer, Earl Walker, and Arthur Montgomery purchased a 750 acres (300 ha) plot of farmland in Braselton, Georgia, with the intent to build a world-class road racing facility. When a Can-Am race had to be canceled due to flood damage, the series organizers chose Road Atlanta to replace it. The track then began to take form quickly, taking only six months to excavate, grade, and pave the road course.

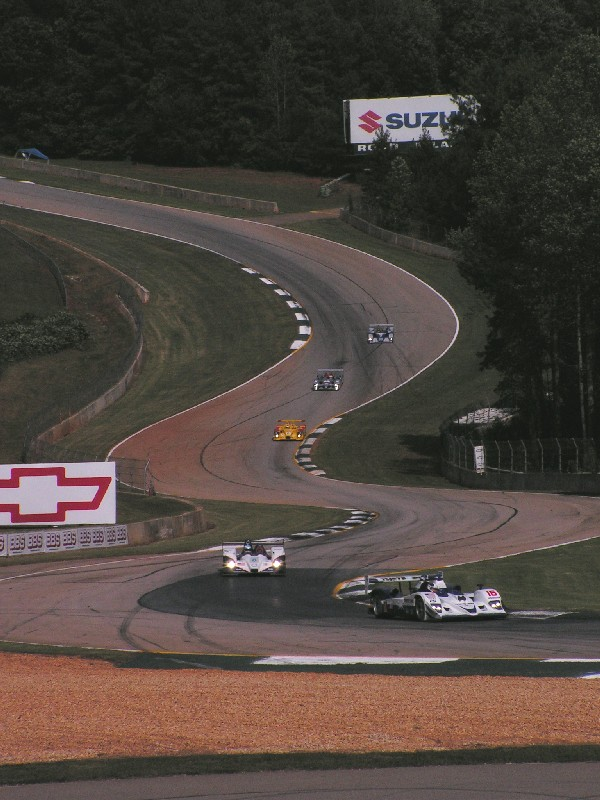
The esses during practice for the 2006 Petit Le Mans

The first race was held on September 13, 1970. Vic Elford, in a Chaparral 2J, won pole and Tony Dean, in a Porsche 908/02, won the 300 km Can-Am event, with Stirling Moss as the grand marshal. Throughout the 1970s, more top-level series came to Road Atlanta, including Can-Am, Formula 5000, IMSA Camel GT, and Trans-Am. The Sports Car Club of America (SCCA) held their annual national championship, the SCCA Runoffs, at Road Atlanta from 1970 to 1993. The first road race in NASCAR Busch Grand National Series history took place at Road Atlanta in 1986.

The track was sold in 1978 to the Whittington brothers (Don and Bill). The brothers were eventually prosecuted for using proceeds from smuggling and selling cannabis to fund their racing activities; according to some of their contemporaries, the back straightaway of Road Atlanta (which to this day has aircraft visibility markers strung above it) doubled as a landing strip for airplanes coming in to pick up or unload product. Following the Whittingtons' convictions the track went into bankruptcy and business executives Frank Drendel, Jim Kanely, Eddie Edwards, George Nuse, and Bill Waddell formed a partnership to purchase it in 1993. They spent the next three years making gradual improvements to the facility. New buildings were constructed, others were renovated, the track was widened and resurfaced and the grounds were landscaped.

In November 1996, Don Panoz purchased the track and made Braselton the base of operations for his motorsports-related ventures. Panoz introduced the first major changes to the track, removing the Dip and creating a chicane at the end of the long back straight. These changes brought the track up to FIA standards, so that international events could be held. A new pit and paddock area was also constructed on the infield side of the track, allowing for larger events, and a 10,000-seat terrace area was constructed around the new Turn 10 complex.

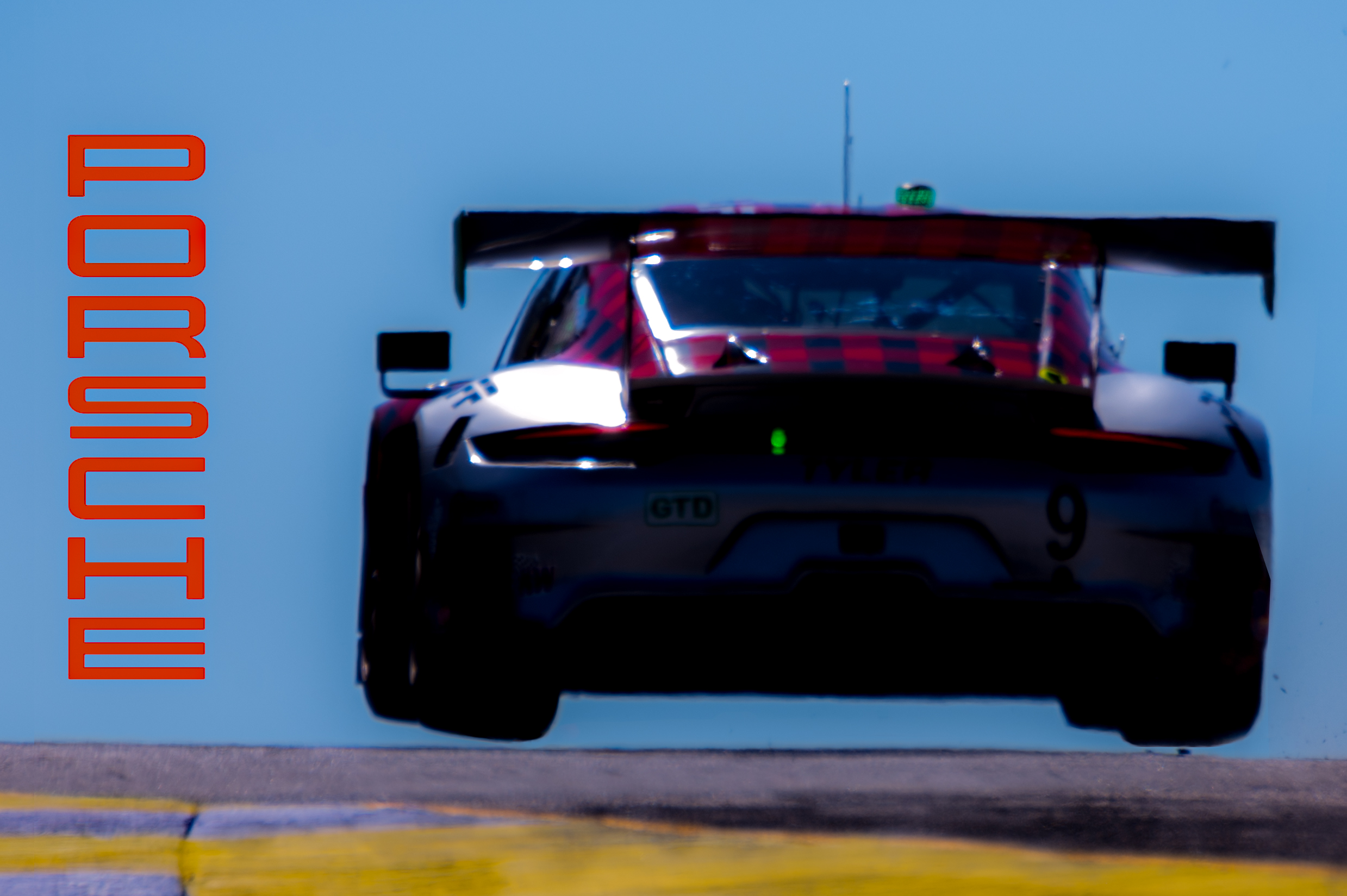
A Porsche 911 GT3 going airborne over the hump

In 1998, major racing resumed at Road Atlanta with the first edition of the Petit Le Mans endurance race. The race attracted worldwide attention, and included entries from the Le Mans-winning Porsche factory team. The race would be the first race of the American Le Mans Series and included a spectacular "blowover" accident where a Porsche 911 GT1 lifted its front while driving over the hump, backflipped in mid air, and flew into the side barriers. A similar incident had occurred there in the 1972 Can-Am season to the McLaren M20 of Denny Hulme, and again in the 2000 race to one of the open top BMW V12 LMR that had won the 1999 Le Mans in which Mercedes-Benz CLR somersaulted no less than three times.

Petit has continued to be an annual event at Road Atlanta, and a marquee event in the ALMS. Prior to the 2007 Petit Le Mans, the entire track surface was repaved. The works also included moving the walls in the esses away from the track, with the intention of improved driver safety and better sight lines for spectators. In the late winter of 2007–2008, the circuit was again modified with the reconfiguration of turns 4 and 12, for the ostensible safety benefit of motorcycle racers (the racing line for cars remained essentially unchanged).

In April 2008, Road Atlanta hosted the 4th stage of the Tour de Georgia, one of the largest cycling stage races in the United States. The stage was run using standard racing bikes instead of the more aerodynamic time trial bikes. Slipstream Chipotle won the stage with a time of 19:38.86, while Astana and Team High Road finished second and third respectively. Used in local cycling events, the circuit is run counterclockwise (in reverse), owing to safety issues from the downhill Turn 11 to Turn 12, creating a steep climb from Turn 12 to Turn 11, and a much safer route for cycling.

The October 2008 Petit Le Mans had a four-day crowd of 113,000 people with an average weekend crowd of nearly 80,000 fans. The race entry list includes a number of new and returning cars.

In September 2012, the track was purchased by IMSA Holdings as part of its acquisition of Panoz Motor Sports Group. The intention was to combine the Grand AM and American Le Mans Series. NASCAR K&N series has announced a return to the track in October 2013 as part of the NASCAR K&N Pro Series East.

In December 2017, the track hosted its first 24 Hours of LeMons event, the Kim Harmon Scrotium 500. The series is also scheduled to return in 2018.

In 2019, the track became Michelin Raceway Road Atlanta after Michelin and IMSA Holdings announced the naming rights agreement.

In 2020, Michelin Raceway hosted the PNC Atlanta 10 Miler: Extreme Hill Edition and 4k Races because of the COVID-19 pandemic.

== In video games ==
The track was first included in the 1985 Commodore 64 game Racing Destruction Set. Road Atlanta is featured in the 1999 PC racing simulator Sports Car GT and the Xbox video game Forza Motorsport and all its subsequent entries.

The track was also digitally created for Electronic Arts' F1 series ('01 – '02), then modded to be compatible with multiple PC games. Scratch-made versions of the track have also been created for rFactor, Papyrus' NASCAR Racing 2003 Season, and BeamNG.drive. It also appears in the PlayStation 2 game Le Mans 24 Hours and on iRacing.com.

In November 2022, the track was added to the PlayStation game Gran Turismo 7. The track was added to the game as part of update 1.26, which was released to mark the series' 25th anniversary.

== Events ==
=== Current ===
- February: ChampCar Endurance Series
- March: Trans-Am Series Road Atlanta SpeedTour, SCCA Super Tour, Atlantic Championship Series, F2000 Championship Series, F1600 Championship Series, Sportscar Vintage Racing Association
- April: MotoAmerica MotoAmerica Superbikes at Road Atlanta, Historic Sportscar Racing Classic Motorsports Mitty
- May: Formula D Drift Atlanta
- June: GT World Challenge America, GT America Series, GT4 America Series, TC America Series, McLaren Trophy America, Toyota Gazoo Racing Cup North America
- July: Sports Car Club of America Summer Sizzle
- September: Historic Sportscar Racing Classic 10 Hour at Road Atlanta, Porsche Sprint Challenge North America
- October: IMSA SportsCar Championship Petit Le Mans, Michelin Pilot Challenge Fox Factory 120, IMSA VP Racing SportsCar Challenge, Porsche Carrera Cup North America, Mazda MX-5 Cup
- November: Sports Car Club of America American Road Race of Champions
- December: 24 Hours of LeMons, National Auto Sport Association

=== Future ===
- IMSA Ford Mustang Challenge (2027)
- NA3 Championship (2018–2019, 2021, 2027)
- NA4 Championship (2016, 2018–2019, 2021, 2027)
- SCCA National Championship Runoffs (1970–1993, 2027–2028)

=== Former ===
- AMA National Championship (1971–1974, 1980, 1986–1988)
- AMA Superbike Championship (1980, 1986–1990, 1993–1994, 1998–2010, 2012)
- American Le Mans Series
  - Grand Prix of Atlanta (1999, 2003, 2005)
  - Petit Le Mans (1999–2013)
- Barber Pro Series (1987–1994, 1998, 2000)
- Can-Am
  - Road Atlanta Can-Am (1970–1974, 1978–1979, 1982, 1984)
- European Le Mans Series
  - Petit Le Mans (2012)
- Ferrari Challenge North America (1995–1996, 1998, 2000–2002, 2004, 2008–2009, 2018, 2020, 2023)
- Formula BMW USA (2005)
- IMSA GT Championship
  - Grand Prix of Atlanta (1973–1992, 1994–1998)
  - Petit Le Mans (1998)
- Indy Lights (2001)
- Lamborghini Super Trofeo North America (2014–2015, 2020)
- NASCAR Busch Series (1986–1987)
- NASCAR K&N Pro Series East (2013)
- North America Talent Cup (2022)
- PNC Atlanta 10 Miler (2020)
- Pro Mazda Championship (1999–2010, 2012)
- Rolex Sports Car Series
  - Grand Prix of Atlanta (2013)
- SCCA/USAC Formula 5000 Championship (1972–1973, 1975)
- SCCA Formula Super Vee Championship (1971–1975, 1979, 1989–1990)
- Star Mazda Series - East Championship (1999–2004)
- U.S. F2000 National Championship (2010)
- Z Nationals (2015–2020)

== Lap records ==
The outright unofficial all-time track record is 1:01.200, set by Marc Gené in a Ferrari F2003-GA, during a 2018 Ferrari Corsa Clienti event. As of October 2026, the fastest official race lap records at Road Atlanta for different classes are listed as:

Category	Time	Driver	Vehicle	Event
Grand Prix Circuit (1998–present): 2.540 mi (4.088 km)
LMP1	1:07.056	Christian Klien	Peugeot 908 HDi FAP	2008 Petit Le Mans
LMP2	1:08.489	Ryan Briscoe	Porsche RS Spyder Evo	2008 Petit Le Mans
DPi	1:08.869	Felipe Nasr	Cadillac DPi-V.R	2019 Petit Le Mans
LMDh	1:10.917	Sébastien Bourdais	Cadillac V-Series.R	2023 Petit Le Mans
LMP900	1:11.782	Allan McNish	Audi R8	2000 Petit Le Mans
LMH	1:11.897	Ross Gunn	Aston Martin Valkyrie AMR-LMH	2026 Petit Le Mans
LMP	1:12.653	JJ Lehto	BMW V12 LMR	1999 Petit Le Mans
LMP675	1:12.781	James Weaver	Lola EX257	2002 Petit Le Mans
DP	1:13.478	Olivier Pla	Honda HPD Ligier JS P2	2016 Petit Le Mans
GT1 (Prototype)	1:15.239	Allan McNish	Porsche 911 GT1-98	1998 Petit Le Mans
WSC	1:15.510	Didier Theys	Ferrari 333 SP	1998 Grand Prix of Road Atlanta
Formula Atlantic	1:15.563	Jonathan Summerton	Swift 016.a	2009 Road Atlanta Atlantic Championship round
LMPC	1:15.871	Jack Hawksworth	Oreca FLM09	2014 Petit Le Mans
LMP3	1:15.942	Garett Grist	Ligier JS P320	2021 Petit Le Mans
LM GTE	1:16.233	Alexander Sims	Chevrolet Corvette C8.R	2021 Petit Le Mans
Indy Lights	1:16.496	Jon Fogarty	Lola T97/20	2001 Atlanta 75
GT1 (GTS)	1:17.053	Jan Magnussen	Chevrolet Corvette C6.R	2008 Petit Le Mans
Formula Regional	1:18.707	Kyle Kirkwood	Ligier JS F3	2018 Road Atlanta F3 Americas round
TA1	1:18.841	Brent Crews	Chevrolet Camaro Trans-Am	2025 Road Atlanta Trans-Am round
GT3	1:18.954	Ross Gunn	Aston Martin Vantage AMR GT3 Evo	2024 Petit Le Mans
Star Mazda	1:19.242	Peter Dempsey	Star Formula Mazda 'Pro'	2008 Road Atlanta Star Mazda Championship round
Lamborghini Super Trofeo	1:20.241	Brandon Gdovic	Lamborghini Huracán Super Trofeo Evo	2020 Road Atlanta Lamborghini Super Trofeo North America round
GT2	1:20.407	Jaime Melo	Ferrari F430 GTC	2008 Petit Le Mans
Porsche Carrera Cup	1:21.258	Riley Dickinson	Porsche 911 (992 I) GT3 Cup	2021 Road Atlanta Porsche Carrera Cup North America round
GT2 (GTS)	1:21.321	Olivier Beretta	Dodge Viper GTS-R	1999 Petit Le Mans
US F2000	1:21.968	Sage Karam	Élan DP08	2010 Road Atlanta US F2000 round
Ferrari Challenge	1:22.845	Cooper MacNeil	Ferrari 488 Challenge Evo	2020 Road Atlanta Ferrari Challenge North America round
McLaren Trophy	1:22.996	Michael O'Brien	McLaren Artura Trophy Evo	2026 Road Atlanta McLaren Trophy America round
GT	1:23.163	Dirk Müller	BMW M3 GTR	2001 Petit Le Mans
SRO GT2	1:23.404	Lawrence Tomlinson	Ginetta G56 GT2	2026 Road Atlanta GT America round
TA2	1:23.788	Thomas Merrill	Ford Mustang Trans-Am	2024 Road Atlanta Trans-Am round
Barber Pro	1:24.290	Jeff Simmons	Reynard 98E	1998 Road Atlanta Barber Pro round
GT4	1:25.500	Jaxon Bell	Toyota GR Supra GT4	2026 Fox Factory 120
Formula 4	1:27.406	Skylar Robinson	Crawford F4-16	2016 Road Atlanta F4 United States round
IMSA GT3	1:27.876	Bill Auberlen	BMW M3 (E36)	1998 Grand Prix of Road Atlanta
TCR Touring Car	1:28.064	Mat Pombo	Honda Civic Type R TCR (FK8)	2023 Fox Factory 120
Formula BMW	1:28.581	Daniel Herrington	Mygale FB02	2005 Road Atlanta Formula BMW USA round
Mustang Challenge	1:32.031	Logan Adams	Ford Mustang Dark Horse R	2026 Road Atlanta Mustang Cup USA round
Mazda MX-5 Cup	1:35.803	Westin Workman	Mazda MX-5 (ND)	2024 Road Atlanta Mazda MX-5 Cup round
Toyota GR Cup	1:36.524	Will Robusto	Toyota GR86	2026 Road Atlanta Toyota GR Cup North America round
Motorcycle Circuit (2008–present): 2.550 mi (4.104 km)
Superbike	1:23.828	Jake Gagne	Yamaha YZF-R1	2023 Road Atlanta MotoAmerica Superbike round
Supersport	1:27.554	Josh Herrin	Ducati Panigale V2	2026 Road Atlanta MotoAmerica Supersport round
Twins Cup	1:31.950	Rocco Landers	Aprilia RS660	2023 Road America MotoAmerica Twins round
Supersport 300	1:40.987	Rocco Landers	Kawasaki Ninja 400R	2020 Road America MotoAmerica Junior Cup round
250cc	1:48.329	Alessandro di Mario	Aprilia RS250SP2	2022 Road Atlanta North America Talent Cup round
Motorcycle Course (2003–2007): 2.548 mi (4.100 km)
Superbike	1:20.731	Mat Mladin	Suzuki GSX-R1000	2007 Road Atlanta AMA Superbike round
Supersport	1:24.328	Martin Craggill	Ducati 749R	2007 Road Atlanta AMA Supersport round
Original Grand Prix Circuit (1970–1997): 2.520 mi (4.055 km)
IMSA GTP	1:08.639	Davy Jones	Jaguar XJR-14	1992 Nissan Grand Prix of Road Atlanta
WSC	1:11.670	Andrea Montermini	Ferrari 333 SP	1997 NAPA Grand Prix of Atlanta
Group 7	1:14.000	Mark Donohue	Porsche 917/30 TC	1973 Road Atlanta Can-Am
Can-Am	1:14.950	Michael Roe	VDS-002	1984 CRC Chemicals Can-Am Championship
IMSA GTX	1:16.540	Danny Ongais	Porsche 935/77A	1978 Camel GT Challenge
IMSA GTP Lights	1:17.118	Parker Johnstone	Spice SE91P	1992 Nissan Grand Prix of Road Atlanta
F5000	1:17.265	Brian Redman	Lola T330	1973 Road Atlanta F5000 round
IMSA GTS	1:17.690	Steve Millen	Nissan 300ZX Turbo	1994 Grand Prix of Atlanta
IMSA GTS-1	1:18.803	Darin Brassfield	Oldsmobile Cutlass Supreme	1995 Road Atlanta 3 Hours
Group 5	1:20.000	Milt Minter	Porsche 917	1971 American Road Race of Champions
Formula Super Vee	1:21.023	Mark Smith	Ralt RT5	1989 Formula Super Vee Road Atlanta - Round 7
IMSA GTO	1:21.616	Steve Millen	Nissan 300ZX Turbo	1991 Road Atlanta 300
Group 6	1:21.867	Mike Hall	Lola T294	1974 U.S. Champions Road Atlanta
IMSA GTS-2	1:22.151	Martin Snow	Porsche 911 GT2 (993)	1997 NAPA Grand Prix of Atlanta
Trans-Am (TO)	1:23.604	Paul Newman	Nissan 300ZX Turbo	1987 Road Atlanta Trans-Am round
IMSA GTS-3	1:24.022	Henry Taleb	Nissan 240SX	1997 NAPA Grand Prix of Atlanta
IMSA GTU	1:24.640	Bill Auberlen	Mazda RX-7	1994 Grand Prix of Atlanta
All American Challenge	1:26.638	Tommy Riggins	Oldsmobile Cutlass	1991 Road Atlanta 300
Group 4	1:26.406	Al Holbert	Porsche 911 Carrera RSR	1975 Road Atlanta 100 Miles
Group 2	1:31.885	Horst Kwech	Ford Capri RS 2600	1973 Trans-Am 500
Group 3	1:32.900	Bob Tullius	Jaguar V-12	1974 U.S. Champions Road Atlanta
IMSA Supercar	1:35.388	Doc Bundy	Lotus Esprit X180R	1992 Nissan Grand Prix of Atlanta
Trans-Am (TU)	1:39.932	John Morton	Datsun 510	1972 Road Atlanta Trans-Am round

== Track configurations ==
Grand Prix Circuit (1970–1997)

Short Circuit (1998–present)

Grand Prix Circuit (1998–present)

Motorcycle Circuit (2003–2007, 2017–present)

Motorcycle Circuit + Turn 4 Chicane (2008–2017)

== See also ==
- Atlanta Motor Speedway
