= Watkins Glen International =

Motorsport track in the United States

"The Glen"

- Grand Prix Circuit (1992–present)

- Short Circuit (1992–present)
- Location: Watkins Glen, New York, United States
- Coordinates: 42°20′13″N 76°55′37″W
- Capacity: 38,900
- FIA Grade: 2 (Note: Watkins Glen International's Grade 2 license expired June 8, 2022.)
- Owner: NASCAR (2019–present); International Speedway Corporation (1997–2019)
- Operator: NASCAR (1997–present)
- Opened: 1956 (as a permanent circuit)
- Former names: Watkins Glen International Raceway (1982–2005); Watkins Glen Grand Prix Circuit (1948–1981)
- Major events: Current: IMSA SportsCar Championship; 6 Hours of Watkins Glen (1956–1981, 1984–2019, 2021–present); WeatherTech 240 at the Glen (1984–1991, 2001–2012, 2021); NASCAR Cup Series; Busch Light at The Glen (1957, 1964–1965, 1986–2019, 2021–present); NASCAR O'Reilly Auto Parts Series; Mission 200 at The Glen (1991–2019, 2021–present); NASCAR Craftsman Truck Series; Bully Hill Vineyards 176 at The Glen (1996–2000, 2021, 2025–2026); ARCA Menards Series; General Tire 100 at The Glen (2001, 2021–2026); Trans-Am Series (1968–1980, 1984–1985, 1990–1998, 2009, 2012–2013, 2016–2019, 2021–present); Future: GT World Challenge America (1992, 1996–1998, 2007–2010, 2018–2019, 2021–2022, 2027); Former: Formula One; United States Grand Prix (1961–1980); IndyCar Series; Grand Prix at The Glen (1979–1981, 2005–2010, 2016–2017); NASCAR K&N Pro Series East; Great Outdoors RV Superstore 100 (1993–2004, 2008–2009, 2014–2019)
- Website: http://www.theglen.com/

Grand Prix Circuit (with Inner Loop Chicane) (1992–present)
- Surface: Asphalt and concrete
- Length: 3.450 mi (5.552 km)
- Turns: 11
- Race lap record: 1:23.9166 ( (France) Sébastien Bourdais, Dallara DW12, 2017, IndyCar)

Short Circuit (with Inner Loop Chicane) (1992–present)
- Surface: Asphalt
- Length: 2.450 mi (3.943 km)
- Turns: 7
- Race lap record: 0:59.920 ( (United States) Davy Jones, Jaguar XJR-14, 1992, IMSA GTP)

Short Circuit (with Esses Chicane) (1979–1991)
- Surface: Asphalt
- Length: 2.428 mi (3.907 km)
- Turns: 8
- Race lap record: 0:59.920 ( (United States) Davy Jones, Jaguar XJR-16, 1991, IMSA GTP)

Grand Prix Circuit (1971–1974, 1986–1991)
- Surface: Asphalt
- Length: 3.377 mi (5.435 km)
- Turns: 11
- Race lap record: 1:35.600 ( (United States) Chip Robinson, Nissan NPT-90, 1990, IMSA GTP)

Grand Prix Circuit (with Esses Chicane) (1975–1985)
- Surface: Asphalt
- Length: 3.377 mi (5.435 km)
- Turns: 11
- Race lap record: 1:34.068 ( (Australia) Alan Jones, Williams FW07B, 1980, F1)

Sports Car Circuit (1971)
- Surface: Asphalt
- Length: 2.430 mi (3.911 km)
- Turns: 7
- Race lap record: 1:06.083 ( (New Zealand) Denny Hulme, McLaren M8F, 1971, Can-Am)

Original Grand Prix Circuit (1956–1970)
- Surface: Asphalt
- Length: 2.350 mi (3.782 km)
- Turns: 8
- Race lap record: 1:02.600 ( (New Zealand) Denny Hulme, McLaren M8B, 1969, Can-Am)

Second Public Road Course (1953–1955)
- Surface: Asphalt, cobbles, concrete, wood, dirt, steel
- Length: 4.600 mi (7.403 km)
- Race lap record: 3:10.800 ( (United States) Bill Spear, Ferrari 375 MM, 1954, Sports car)

Original Public Road Course (1948–1952)
- Surface: Asphalt, cobbles, concrete, wood, dirt, steel
- Length: 6.600 mi (10.622 km)
- Turns: 28 (approximately)
- Race lap record: 5:13.500 ( (United States) Phil Walters, Healey-Cadillac Special, 1950, FL)

Watkins Glen International, nicknamed "The Glen", is an automobile race track located in Dix, New York, United States, just southwest of the village of Watkins Glen for which it is named, at the southern tip of Seneca Lake. It is the former home of the Formula One United States Grand Prix, which it hosted for twenty consecutive years from 1961 to 1980. In addition, the site has also been home to road racing of nearly every class, including the World Sportscar Championship, Trans-Am, Can-Am, NASCAR, the International Motor Sports Association, and the IndyCar Series. The facility is currently owned by NASCAR.

The course was opened in 1956 to host auto races previously held on public roads in and around the village. The circuit's current layout has more or less been the same since 1971, with minor modifications after the fatal crashes of François Cevert (1973), Helmut Koinigg (1974) and J. D. McDuffie (1991).

The site has also hosted several music concerts: the 1973 Summer Jam, featuring The Allman Brothers Band, the Grateful Dead, and The Band and was attended by 600,000 fans; and two Phish festivals: Super Ball IX in 2011 and Magnaball in 2015.

== Layouts ==
The Watkins Glen International racecourse has undergone several changes over time, with five general layouts widely recognized over its history. Currently, two distinct layouts are used: the "Boot" layout (long course) and the "1971 Six Hours" layout (short course).

=== Public roads ===
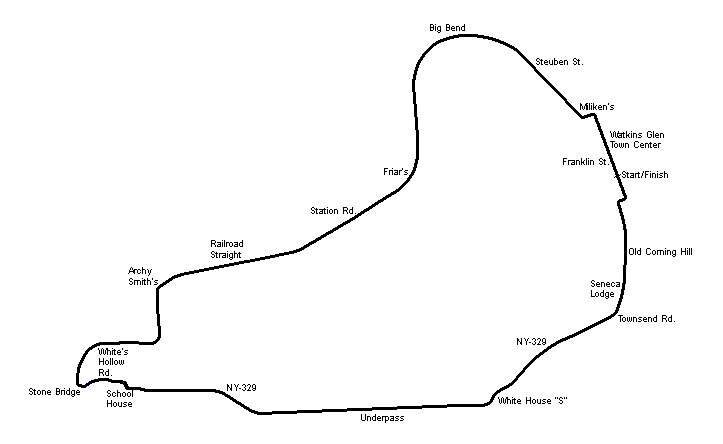
The original Watkins Glen street course

The first races in Watkins Glen were organized by Cameron Argetsinger, whose family had a summer home in the area. With local Chamber of Commerce approval and SCCA sanction, the first Watkins Glen Grand Prix took place in 1948 on a 6.600 mi (10.622 km) course over local public roads. For the first few years, the races passed through the heart of the town with spectators lining the sidewalks. However, after a car driven by Fred Wacker left the road in the 1952 race, killing seven-year-old Frank Fazzari and injuring several others, the race was moved to a new location on a wooded hilltop southwest of town. The original course is listed in the New York State Register and National Register of Historic Places as the Watkins Glen Grand Prix Course, 1948–1952.

The second layout (4.600 mi (7.403 km)) began use in 1953 and also used existing roads. The Watkins Glen Grand Prix Corporation was formed to manage spectators, parking, and concessions; this arrangement lasted three years.

=== Grand Prix Course ===
Watkins Glen from 1956 to 1970

The first permanent course, known as the Watkins Glen Grand Prix Race Course was constructed on 550 acres (2.2 km^{2}), overlapping part of the previous street course. Designed by Bill Milliken and engineering professors from Cornell University, the 2.350 mi (3.782 km) layout was used from 1956 to 1970. In 1968, the sports car race was extended to six hours.

=== Short Course ===
The full Long Course (1971–1991) including the "Boot"; the 1971 Six Hours layout is illustrated with the gray connection after the Outer Loop

The circuit underwent a major overhaul for the 1971 season. The "Big Bend" and the turns leading up to it were eliminated and replaced with a new pit straight. The pits and start/finish line were moved to this new straightaway. "The 90" now became Turn 1 instead of Turn 8.

When the 1971 Six Hours of Watkins Glen arrived in July 1971, the overall circuit renovations were still unfinished. The short course had been finished, but the Boot segments were not complete, nor was the new pit area. The 1971 Six Hours race was run on the short course layout. That layout colloquially became known as the 1971 Six Hours Course. In addition, for 1971 only, the cars used the original start/finish line and the old pits.

When NASCAR returned to the track in 1986, it used the short course layout. IMSA initially used the "Boot", but eventually, that series also began using the shorter 1971 layout.

The short course was slightly lengthened in 1992 (see "Inner Loop" below).

=== Long Course (The "Boot") ===
The most significant change to the track, a new segment known as "The Boot", was finished in time for the Formula One race in 1971. The start-finish line was moved to the new pit straight as planned. At the end of the backstretch, after the Loop-Chute, cars swept left into a new four-turn complex that departed from the old layout, curling left-hand downhill through the woods. The track followed the edge of the hillside to two uphill right-hand turns, over an exciting blind crest into a right-hand turn, down and up into a left-hand turn rejoining the old track.

The new layout measured 3.377 mi (5.435 km); with its intrinsic link to the Formula One race, it became known colloquially as the Grand Prix Circuit.

For 1972, the Six Hours sportscar race also began using the full "Boot" layout. By that time, nearly all facility improvements were completed. The pits and start/finish line were permanently moved to the new pit straight.

In 1973, French driver François Cevert, a previous winner at the Glen, died in a crash during practice at the 1973 United States Grand Prix. This led course officials in 1975 to add a fast right-left chicane to slow speeds in the turn 3-4 Esses section. Dubbed the "Scheckter Chicane", it was eliminated in 1985.

In the early 1990s, the IMSA sports cars bypassed the "Boot" in favor of the short course. NASCAR events have never used the Boot layout. The "Long/Boot" course was slightly lengthened in 1992 (see "Inner Loop" below). In the mid-2000s, the Boot segment, which had seen little use in many years, was repaved and upgraded. When the IndyCar Series returned to Watkins Glen starting in 2005, they used the Boot segment.

The entire course was repaved in 2015. There has been a renewed interest and appreciation of the full Grand Prix Course layout in recent years. Consideration had even been made for NASCAR to start using the Boot.

=== Inner Loop ===
The most recent significant change to the course was made in 1992, after several serious crashes at the "Loop" at the end of the backstretch. During the 1989 Budweiser at the Glen, Geoff Bodine blew a tire at the end of the backstretch. He broke into a hard spin and sailed straight off the track, crashing head-on into the barrier. In 1991, during the IMSA Camel Continental VIII, Tommy Kendall's Intrepid RM-1 prototype crashed in the Loop, severely injuring his legs. Seven weeks later, NASCAR Winston Cup driver J. D. McDuffie died in an accident at the same site during the 1991 Budweiser at The Glen.

Before the 1992 season, track officials constructed a bus stop chicane along the back straight just before the Loop. Dubbed the "Inner Loop", it led into what was now being called the "Outer Loop." This addition slightly increased the lap distance for both layouts.

== History ==
=== Watkins Glen Grand Prix ===
Along with the annual SCCA race, the track hosted its first professional race (NASCAR Grand National Division) in 1957. It hosted its first international event with the Formula Libre races from 1958 to 1960. Among the drivers participating were Jack Brabham, Stirling Moss, Phil Hill, and Dan Gurney.

=== United States Grand Prix ===
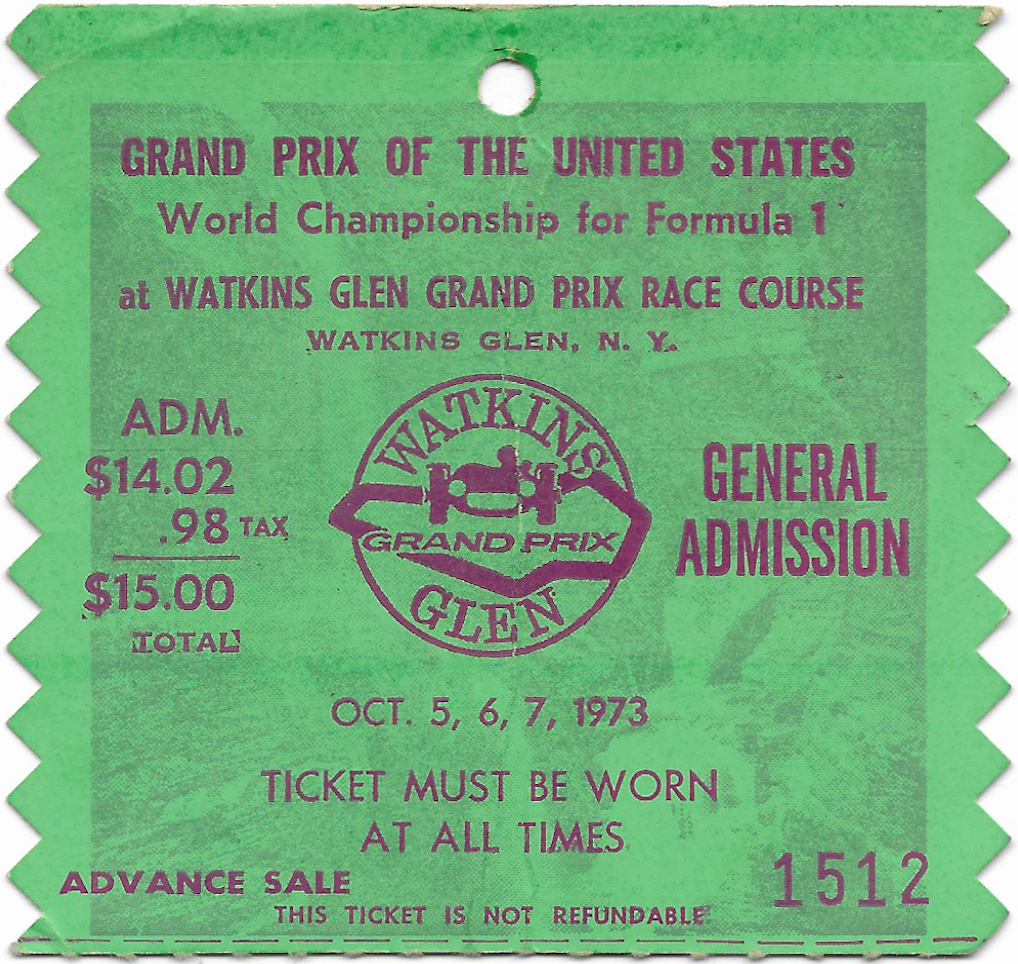
1973 United States Grand Prix ticket

After two editions of the Formula One United States Grand Prix that were deemed less than successful (Sebring in 1959, and Riverside in 1960), promoters were looking for a new venue to become the permanent home for the United States Grand Prix.

In 1961, just six weeks before the scheduled date for another Formula Libre race that fall, Argetsinger was tapped to prepare Watkins Glen for the final round of the Formula One World Championship. While many of the necessary preparations had already been made, new pits were constructed to satisfy international standards of pit boxes with overhead cover.

Seven American drivers participated, and the 1961 United States Grand Prix was won by British driver Innes Ireland in a Lotus-Climax. American Dan Gurney driving a Porsche 718 placed second. Having already won both Driver's and Constructor's World Championships and still mourning the death of Wolfgang von Trips at the 1961 Italian Grand Prix, Ferrari decided not to compete in the United States GP. Ferrari's decision not to travel to the United States for the season's final round deprived Hill of participating in his home race as the newly crowned World Champion, and Hill appeared only as the event's Grand Marshal.

The United States Grand Prix at Watkins Glen quickly became an autumnal tradition as huge crowds of racing fans flocked to Upstate New York each year amid the region's autumn leaf color. The race was also among the most popular on the global Grand Prix calendar with the teams and drivers because its starting and prize money often exceeded those of the other races combined. The race received the Grand Prix Drivers' Association award for the best organized and best staged GP of the season in 1965, 1970, and 1972.

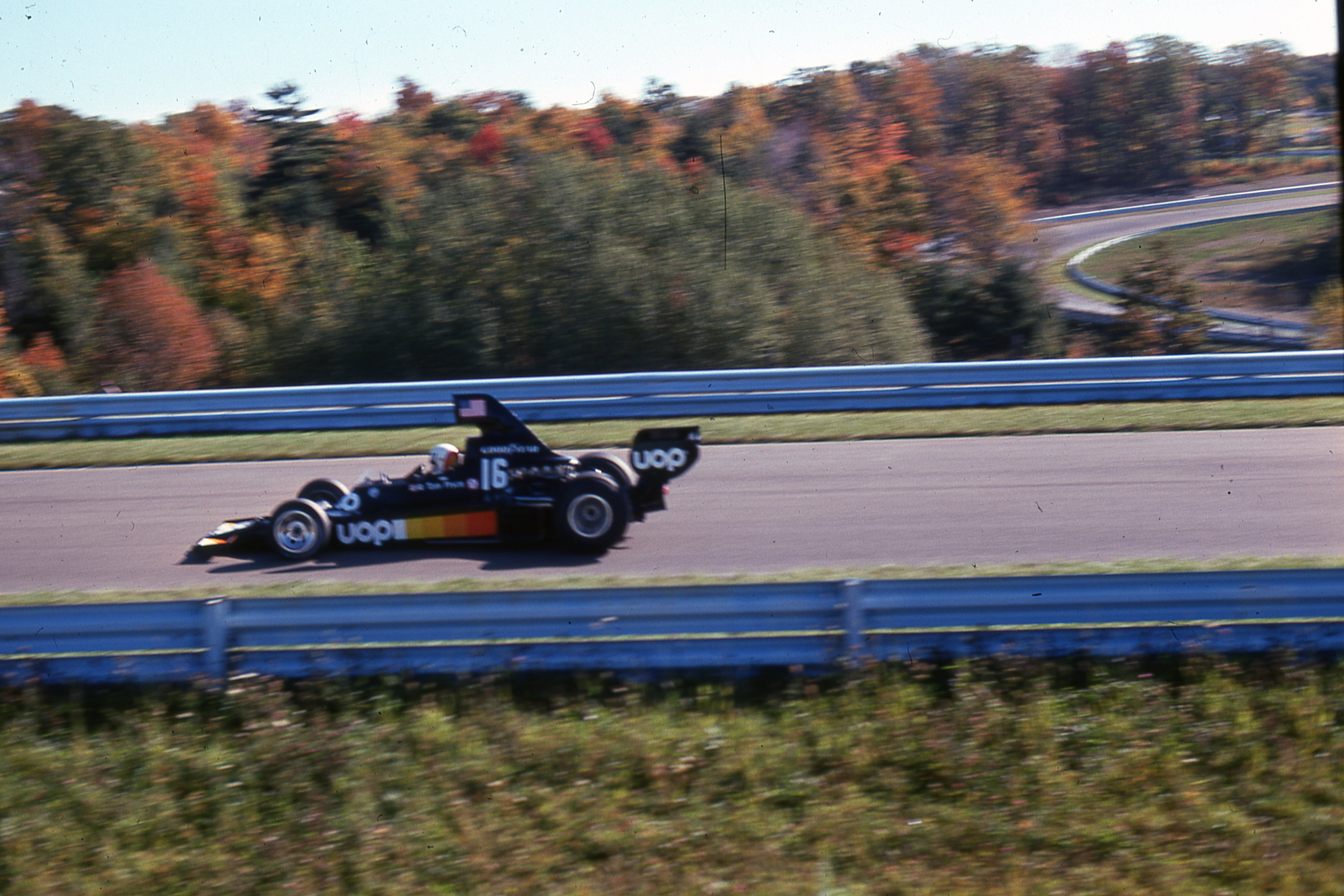
Tom Pryce at the 1975 United States Grand Prix in the Boot's main straight

One fixture of the USGP at Watkins Glen was the starter for the races, Richard Norman "Tex" Hopkins. Hopkins was the most recognizable starter in Grand Prix racing, wearing a lavender suit, clenching a big cigar in his mouth, and giving the job everything he had. Once the cars had taken their places, Hopkins strode across the front of the grid with his back to the field, turned, and jumped into the air while waving the national flag to start the race. He would similarly meet the winner at the finish, this time waving the checkered flag as the car crossed the line.

Before the 1971 race, the course underwent its most significant changes of the Grand Prix era, as it was extended from 2.350 to 3.377 mi (3.782 to 5.435 km) by the addition of four corners in a new section called the 'Boot' or 'Anvil'. The new layout departed from the old course near the south end into a curling downhill left-hand turn through the woods. The track followed the edge of the hillside to two consecutive right-hand turns, over an exciting blind crest to a left-hand turn, and back onto the old track. In addition, the circuit was widened and resurfaced. The pits and start-finish line were moved back before the northwest right-angle corner known as "The 90". In 1975, a fast right-left chicane was added to slow speeds through the series of corners in the Esses section.

Despite the improvements, the circuit was unsafe for the increasingly faster and stiffer ground effect cars of the late 1970s. A few horrendous, sometimes fatal accidents occurred (such as those that claimed the lives of Helmut Koinigg and François Cevert). Increasingly rowdy segments of the crowd began to tarnish its image as well. Finally, in May 1981, several months after Alan Jones had won the 1980 race for Williams, the International Auto Sports Federation removed the race from its schedule because the track had failed to pay its $800,000 debt to the teams.

=== American road-racing Mecca ===
The Glen hosted a variety of other events throughout the Grand Prix years: from Can-Am, Trans-Am, IROC, and Endurance Sports car racing, to Formula 5000 and the CART series, these races strengthened the circuit's reputation as the premier road racing facility in the United States. From 1968 through 1981, the "Six Hours at The Glen" endurance race featured top drivers such as Mario Andretti, Jacky Ickx, Pedro Rodríguez, and Derek Bell. Different races were sometimes featured together on the same weekend (e.g., Six Hours and Can-Am) and drew sizable crowds. However, without a Formula One race, the circuit struggled to survive. It finally declared bankruptcy and closed in 1981.

=== Renovation ===
The track was not well maintained for two years and hosted only a few SCCA meets without spectators. In 1983, Corning Enterprises, a subsidiary of nearby Corning, partnered with International Speedway Corporation to purchase the track and rename it Watkins Glen International.

The renovated track, with the chicane at the bottom of the Esses removed, reopened in 1984 with the return of IMSA with the Camel Continental I, which would be conducted until 1995, with the last two years under the name "The Glen Continental" after Camel's withdrawal from IMSA. (The event was numbered with Roman numerals.)

In 1986, the top NASCAR series returned to Watkins Glen after a long layoff, holding one of only three road races on its schedule (two beginning in 1988), using the 1971 Six Hours course, raced when the new section off the Loop-Chute was not finished in time. As the cars come off the Loop-Chute, instead of making the downhill left into Turn 6, the cars shot straight through the straight and headed toward Turn 10, as was the case from 1961 until 1970.

NASCAR Busch Series (now called NASCAR O'Reilly Auto Parts Series) action would arrive in 1991 with a 150 mi (240 km) race on the weekend of the Camel Continental, won by Terry Labonte, who would be a master of the circuit during its Busch Series races, winning the inaugural race, and winning three consecutive races from 1995 until 1997. The 1995 race would be the first conducted as a 200 mi (320 km) race, and became the first Busch Series race to be televised on broadcast network television, as CBS broadcast the race live until TNN took over in 1997.

Only twice—1998 and 1999—did a Busch Series regular driver win the race. The first seven races were won by Winston Cup Series regular drivers, sometimes referred to as "Buschwhackers", during their off-week. In 1998, the race went against the Cup race in Sonoma, California, eliminating the idea, and stayed that way until 2000. In 2001, the race was run the day after the first Saturday in July.

However, the race was eliminated from the schedule after the 2001 season, only to return in 2005 as an undercard to the Nextel Cup race.

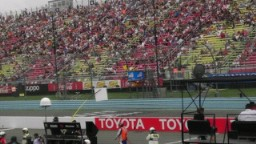
The Start/Finish line at Watkins Glen International

A pair of incidents in 1991 resulted in a massive overhaul of the circuit's safety. During the IMSA Camel Continental VIII, Tommy Kendall's prototype crashed in Turn 5, severely injuring his legs. Seven weeks later, NASCAR Cup Series driver J. D. McDuffie died in an accident at the same site in the 1991 Budweiser at the Glen. Track officials added a bus stop chicane to the back straight in Spring 1992.

In 1996, the Glen Continental reverted to a six-hour format, again called the Six Hours at the Glen with the IMSA format, and stayed there until a split in American sports car racing. In 1998, the race became an event sanctioned by the Sports Car Club of America under their United States Road Racing Championship. In 1999, the FIA GT series staged a 500 km race of three hours with some USRRC entrants after USRRC canceled the last two rounds of their season before their six-hour event at the track. The following year, the six-hour race returned once again with the newly founded Grand American Road Racing Association (Grand-Am) sanctioning the event. The event is now sanctioned by IMSA with the WeatherTech SportsCar Championship. The six-hour race is now the third part of the four-part North American Endurance Cup series.

In 1997, International Speedway Corporation became the sole owner of the course, as Corning Enterprises believed they had completed their intended goals to rebuild the race track and increase tourism in the southern Finger Lakes region of New York State.

The circuit annually hosts one of the nation's premier vintage events, the Zippo U.S. Vintage Grand Prix. When the fiftieth anniversary of road racing in Watkins Glen was celebrated during the 1998 racing season, this event was the climax, returning many original cars and drivers to the original 6.600 mi (10.622 km) street circuit through the village during the Grand Prix Festival Race Reenactment.

After a 25-year layoff, major-league open-wheel racing returned to the track as one of three road courses on the 2005 Indy Racing League schedule. In preparation, the circuit was overhauled again. Grandstands from Pennsylvania's Nazareth Speedway, which had closed, were installed, the gravel in The 90 was removed and replaced with a paved runoff area, and curbing was cut down for the Indy Racing League event. Previously, the high curbing in the chicane had become a place where Cup Series cars would bounce high off the curbing, creating an ideal opportunity for cars to lose control and to slow cars. Other areas of the track received improvements: the exits of turn 2 (the bottom of the esses), the chicane, turn 6 (the entrance to the boot), turn 9, and turn 11 all had additional runoff areas created and safety barrier upgrades. The carousel runoff was paved, and turn 1 (the 90), and the esses were paved in the winter of 2006–07. Augmenting what was already in place along the front stretch, additional high safety fences were installed on the overpasses crossing the service roads at the top of the esses and just out of the boot immediately after the exit of turn 9.

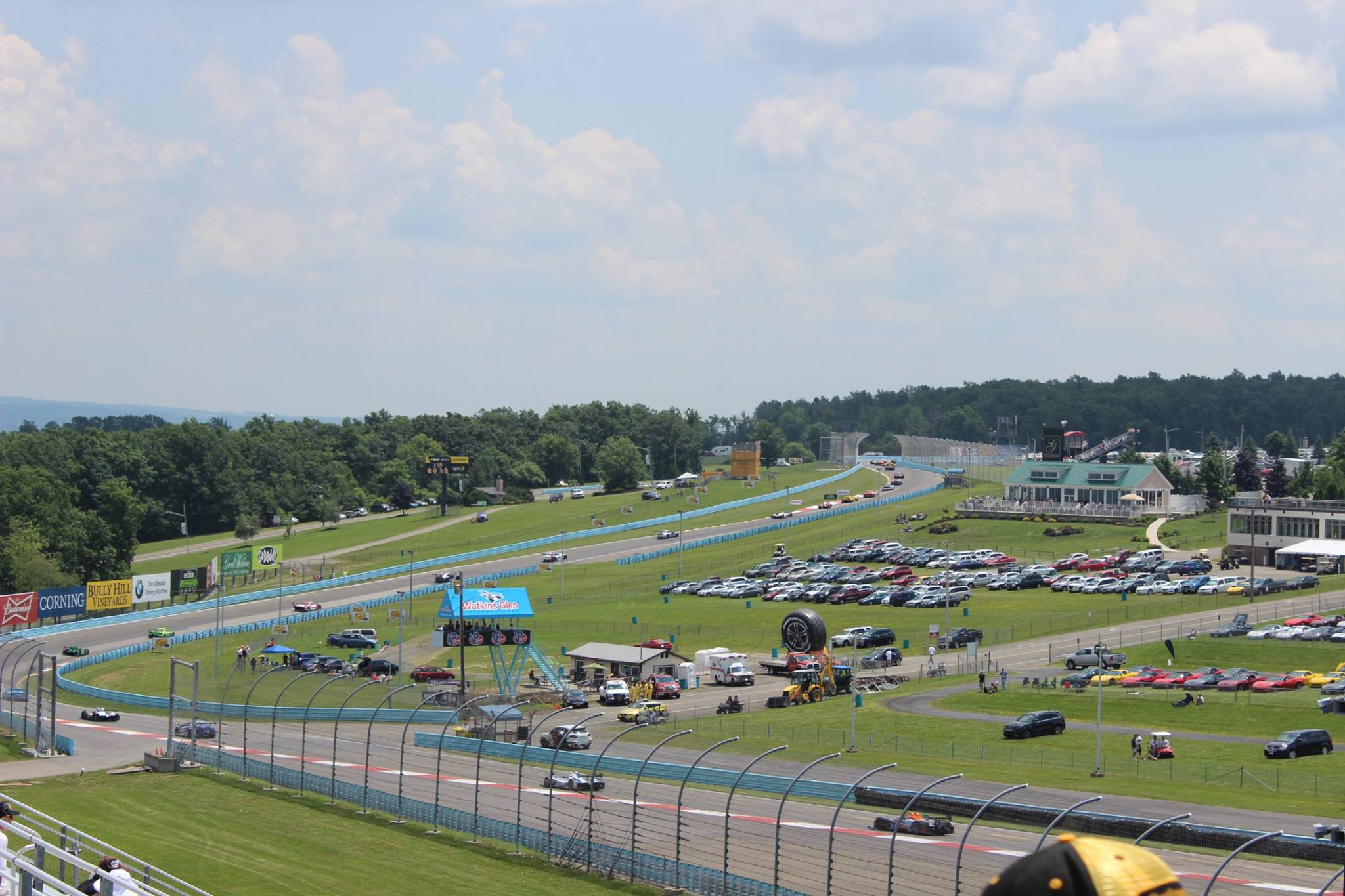
Cars drive through the Esses during the 2014 Sahlen's Six Hours of The Glen.

Another overhaul for 2006 made fundamental changes to the circuit for the first time since 1992. Officials installed a new control tower, which includes booths for the officials, timing and scoring, television and radio (the new position allows broadcasters to see more action from Turn 10 through the foot of the Esses), and the public address announcer on top of the new front stretch grandstand, moving the start-finish line farther ahead of the bridge, as the start-finish line is moved 380 ft (120 m) farther toward The 90 in order to accommodate the new timing and scoring post. The new start-finish line also meant the starting lights used for club races were moved farther ahead, creating more action off Turn 11 as tactics changed with the later finish line, where slingshot moves could become paramount to the finish. A new media center was constructed to replace the former building, which also had been the control tower with the 1971 improvements. The aging structure had been the bane of many professional media members during those years with many uncomplimentary things published and broadcast about its inadequacies, especially the lack of insulation, air conditioning, few (if any) amenities that other facilities had, which resulted in race control moving to the new control tower at the start-finish line in 2006. Plans were made to move the new media center back to allow an entire 43-car NASCAR grid. Other changes to the infrastructure included the purchase of adjoining property. Most of Bronson Hill Road was incorporated as a service road to the facility. A new section of Bronson Hill leading up from NY 414 was built as the main ingress road to the facility, bending south at Gate 6 and continuing to County Road 16, just south of the credentials and sheriff's office buildings.

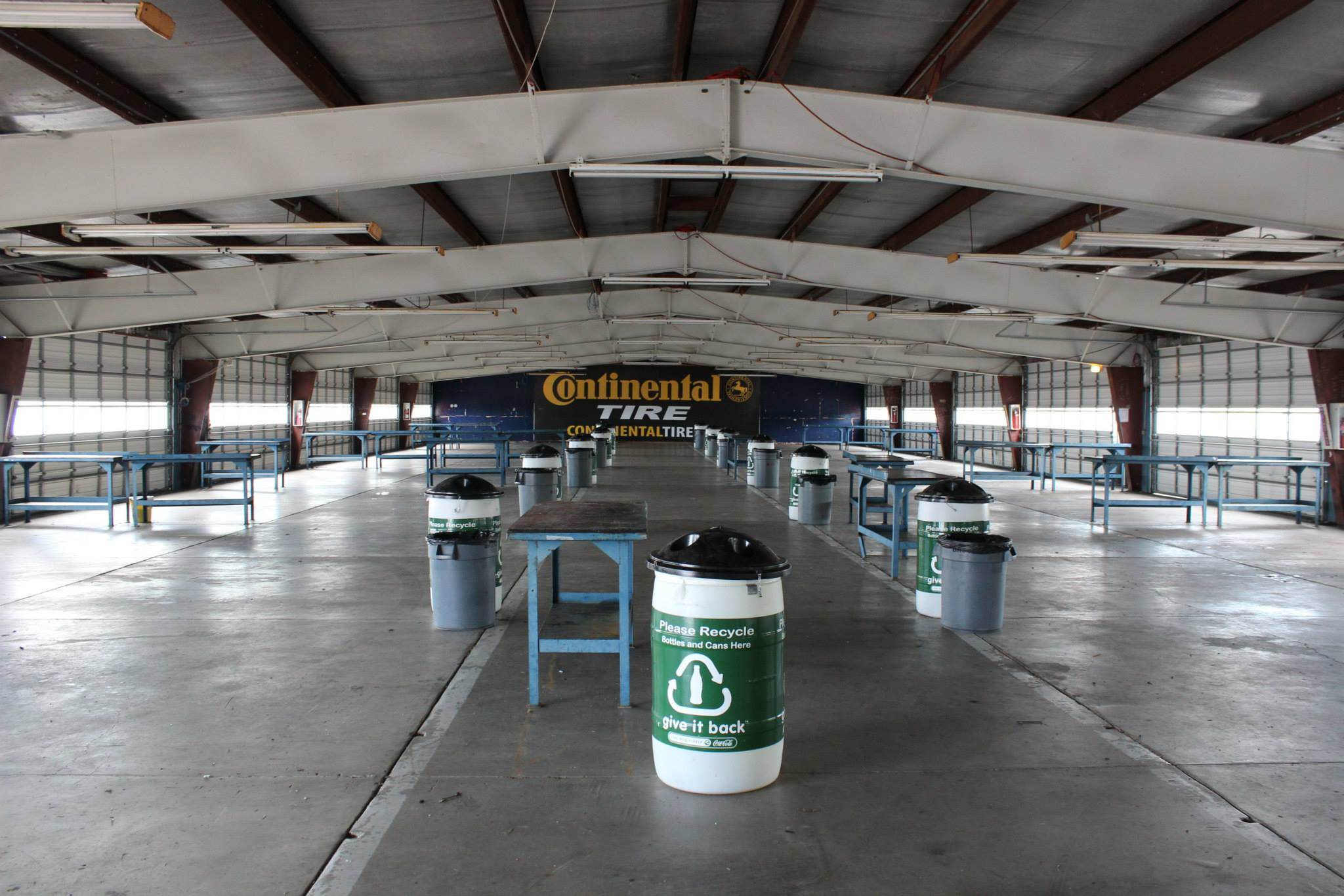
Watkins Glen International Garage Area

Track safety also is constantly changing, and constant training is needed. Race Services Inc. provides the track with volunteers to work Fire-Rescue, Medical, Grid personnel, and Corner workers to help keep drivers and spectators safe.

The Argetsinger family is an advisor to the circuit. The track named the trophy for the inaugural Watkins Glen Indy Grand Prix presented by Argent in honor of the late patriarch, Cameron.

On Tuesday, March 6, 2007, just before 9 pm, a fire destroyed the recently remodeled Glen Club situated on top of the esses. Originally called the Onyx Club (named for the sponsor, Onyx Cologne), the Glen Club was used primarily as an upscale venue for race fans. After being recently remodeled, it was advertised as a social venue for locals for weddings, business meetings, etc. No cause could be determined, and the building was a total loss. The loss included irreplaceable, unique original motorsport artwork donated to the facility by several artists and other racing memorabilia. Glen officials were quoted in local media stories as being adamant that the loss of the Glen Club would not affect the 2007 racing schedule.

For 2007, Watkins Glen International again improved the facility, specifically the track surface. All of turns 1 (the "90"), 5 (the "Loop-Chute") and 6 (entry turn into the "Boot") were repaved. A temporary "Glen Club" replaced the permanent structure destroyed by fire at the races in 2007, which was replaced with another permanent building. New sponsors for both the INDY and NASCAR weekends were signed to multi-year deals. Camping World became the sponsor of the "Camping World Grand Prix" INDY weekend at the Glen through 2010. The NASCAR weekend at the Glen received a double shot—Zippo Manufacturing announced a three-year extension of the Busch-Nationwide Series race, the "Zippo 200". The NASCAR Cup Series race became known as "The Heluva Good! Sour Cream dips at the Glen". Additionally, Brad Penn lubricants of Pennsylvania (former Kendall Oil refinery) was announced as the sponsor of the annual vintage sports car weekend for 2007 and 2008. IndyCar took a six-year hiatus from the facility when the series pulled out of the Glen after 2010 due to a dispute with track owner ISC.

In June 2011, Tony Stewart and Lewis Hamilton participated in the "Mobil 1 Seat Swap". Stewart drove his No. 14 Mobil 1 Chevy for four laps around the circuit while Hamilton drove the McLaren MP4-23, Vodafone McLaren Mercedes's entry in the 2008 Formula One season. After some time, both drivers swapped cars and drove more laps around the circuit. The event was open to the public, and it was hoped that it would renew interest in the track. Before this event, the curbs on some of the turns were changed, the white rumble strips being replaced by the more common, red-white designs seen on most road courses around the world.

In July 2011, WGI hosted a Phish concert. This is the first concert that WGI has held since the Summer Jam.

In October 2012, the track suffered damage from Hurricane Sandy, with damage reported to be up to $50,000.

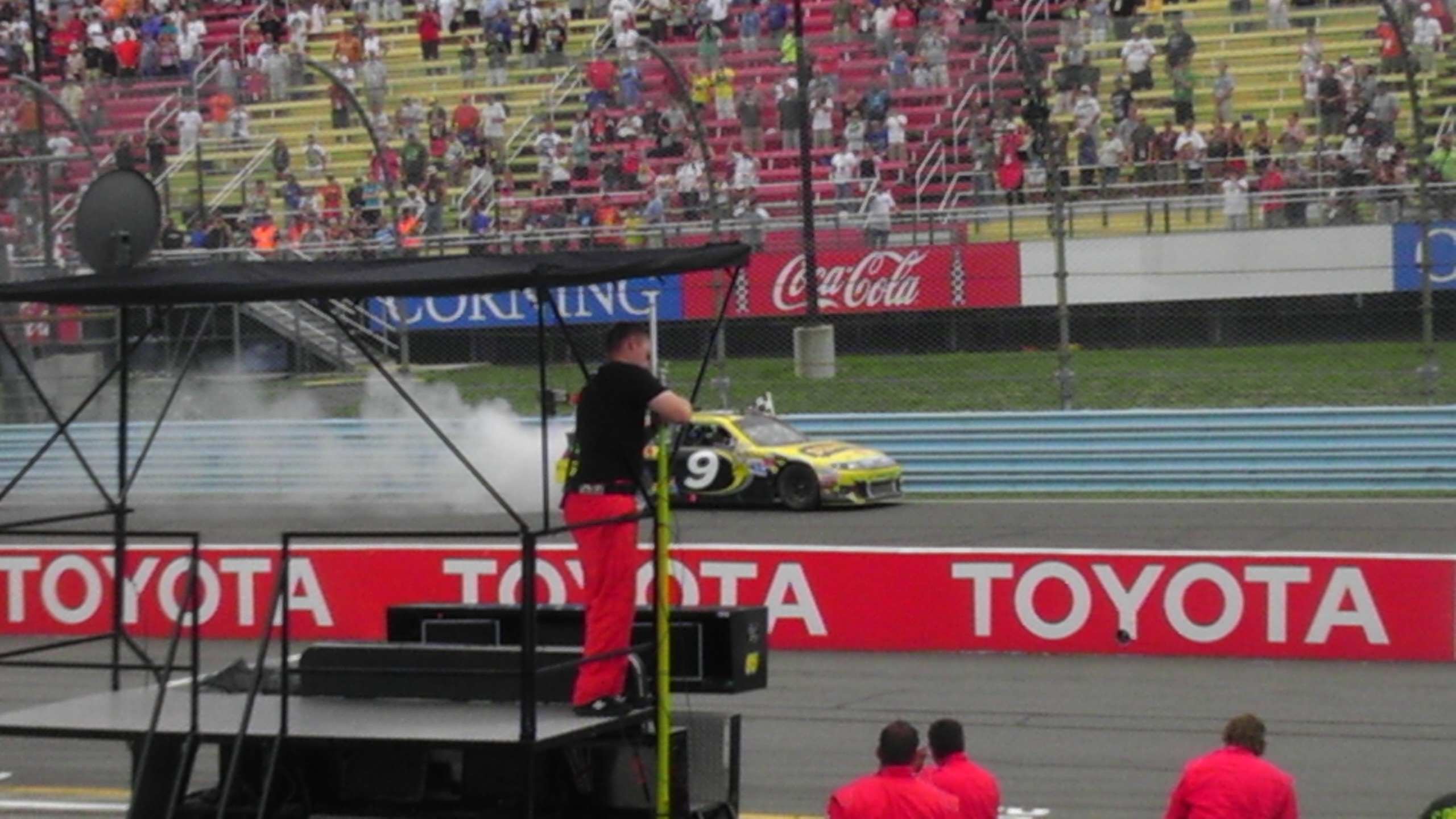
Marcos Ambrose celebrating the Finger Lakes 355 at the Glen

Prior to the 2014 season, the track cleaned out a storage barn on track property when the original Dunlop Bridge was found. The bridge was initially used as a VIP area for Dunlop until being moved for use as the starters stand years later. It was taken down and replaced by a new starters stand during renovations in 2006. The bridge was put back up at the exit to the 90 near the original location where it once stood near the original start/finish line for the track and is now once again used for VIP use by companies on race weekends, with the company sponsoring the bridge.

After the 2014 racing season, it was announced that the 2015 racing season would conclude with the NASCAR weekend in early August. This was to allow for a complete repaving of the track. The repave involved removing the entire racing surface. In some places, the track was taken down to the dirt roadbed. This was funded not only by International Speedway Corporation but with a grant from New York State.

In March 2015, due to their previous concert's success, Phish said they would do another concert at WGI in late August.

In August 2015, with repaving already having taken place in the Boot, NASCAR announced that they are considering running the complete Grand Prix Course. But as of 2022, NASCAR is still not using the Boot, and the use or not of the Boot is still a debate between NASCAR and fans.

2016 would see the return of IndyCar racing to Watkins Glen, with the track being added to the schedule following the collapse of plans for a street race in Boston. It was held over the Labor Day weekend and used the full layout: ICS officials were also negotiating with WGI to race there permanently.

== Events ==
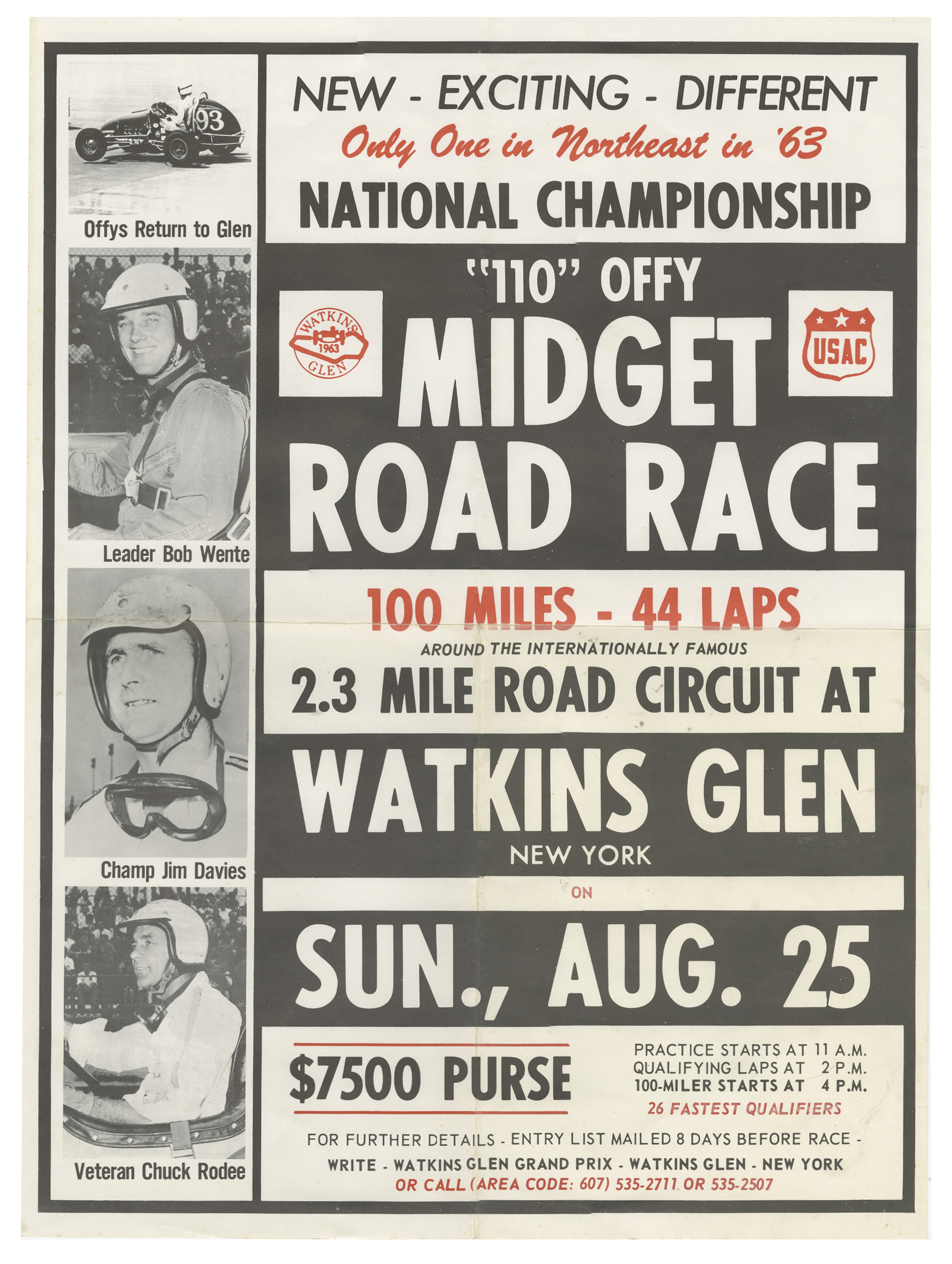
Event poster from a 1963 midget road race held at Watkins Glen; from top to bottom on left: Bob Wente, Jimmy Davies, and Chuck Rodee

Current

- April: National Auto Sport Association
- May: NASCAR Cup Series Busch Light at The Glen, NASCAR O'Reilly Auto Parts Series Mission 200 at The Glen, NASCAR Craftsman Truck Series Bully Hill Vineyards 176 at The Glen, ARCA Menards Series General Tire 100 at The Glen, ChampCar Endurance Series
- June: IMSA SportsCar Championship 6 Hours of Watkins Glen, Historic Sportscar Racing Classic Six Hours of Watkins Glen, Michelin Pilot Challenge Watkins Glen International 120, Lamborghini Super Trofeo North America, Porsche Carrera Cup North America, Mustang Challenge North America, SCCA Super Tour
- July: Trans-Am Series Watkins Glen SpeedTour, Atlantic Championship Series, F2000 Championship Series, F1600 Championship Series
- September: Sportscar Vintage Racing Association Watkins Glen SpeedTour
- October: National Auto Sport Association

Future

- Ferrari Challenge North America (1995, 2001–2002, 2010, 2014, 2018, 2021–2022, 2024–2025, 2027)
- GT World Challenge America (1992, 1996–1998, 2007–2010, 2018–2019, 2021–2022, 2027)
- IMSA VP Racing SportsCar Challenge (2027)
- McLaren Trophy America (2027)

Former

- Barber Pro Series (1986–1991, 1993–1999)
- Can-Am (1969–1974, 1977–1981)
- Championship Auto Racing Teams
  - Watkins Glen 200 (1979–1981)
- FIA GT Championship
  - Bosch Sports Car Oktoberfest (1999)
- Formula One
  - United States Grand Prix (1961–1980)
- IMSA GT Championship
  - 6 Hours of Watkins Glen (1984–1997)
  - Crown Royal 200 at the Glen (1984–1991)
- IMSA GT3 Cup Challenge (2013–2019)
- IMSA GT3 Cup Challenge Canada (2016–2017)
- IMSA SportsCar Championship
  - WeatherTech 240 at the Glen (2021)
- Indy Lights (2005–2010, 2016–2017)
- IndyCar Series
  - Grand Prix at The Glen (2005–2010, 2016–2017)
- International Race of Champions (1986–1989, 1991)
- Mazda MX-5 Cup (2016–2017, 2022–2023)
- NASCAR K&N Pro Series East
  - Great Outdoors RV Superstore 100 (1993–2004, 2008–2009, 2014–2019)
- NASCAR Whelen Modified Tour (1996–2000)
- Pro Mazda Championship (2008, 2017)
- Rolex Sports Car Series
  - 6 Hours of Watkins Glen (2000–2013)
  - Continental Tire 200 (2001–2012)
- SCCA/USAC Formula 5000 Championship (1972–1976)
- SCCA National Sports Car Championship
  - 6 Hours of Watkins Glen (1956–1962)
  - Glen Classic (1963)
  - The Glen 500 (1964)
- Stadium Super Trucks (2017)
- United States Road Racing Championship
  - 6 Hours of Watkins Glen (1963–1968, 1998)
- US F2000 National Championship (1994–1998, 2000–2002, 2017)
- World Sportscar Championship
  - 6 Hours of Watkins Glen (1968–1981)

== Lap records ==
As of July 2026, the fastest official race lap records at Watkins Glen International are listed as:

Category	Time	Driver	Vehicle	Event
Grand Prix Circuit (with Inner Loop Chicane) (1992–present): 3.450 mi (5.552 km)
IndyCar	1:23.9166	Sébastien Bourdais	Dallara DW12	2017 IndyCar Grand Prix at The Glen
DPi	1:29.657	Olivier Pla	Mazda RT24-P	2019 6 Hours of The Glen
LMP2	1:32.444	Giedo van der Garde	Oreca 07	2022 Sahlen's Six Hours of The Glen
LMDh	1:33.028	Jack Aitken	Cadillac V-Series.R	2023 Sahlen's Six Hours of The Glen
Indy Lights	1:33.6921	Dean Stoneman	Dallara IL-15	2016 Watkins Glen Indy Lights round
DP	1:34.515	Olivier Pla	Ligier JS P2	2016 6 Hours of The Glen
LMH	1:36.310	Roman De Angelis	Aston Martin Valkyrie AMR-LMH	2025 Sahlen's Six Hours of The Glen
LMPC	1:37.300	Renger van der Zande	Oreca FLM09	2016 6 Hours of The Glen
IMSA GTP	1:39.011	Juan Manuel Fangio II	Eagle MkIII	1993 Fay's Drugs Weekend at the Glen
LMP900	1:39.200	Oliver Gavin	Lola B2K/10	2000 6 Hours of The Glen
WSC	1:39.617	Didier Theys	Ferrari 333 SP	2001 6 Hours of The Glen
LMP3	1:39.967	Colin Braun	Ligier JS P320	2021 WeatherTech 240 at The Glen
Formula Atlantic	1:40.634	Jimmy Simpson	Swift 016.a	2014 Watkins Glen Atlantic Championship round
LM GTE	1:41.141	Joey Hand	Ford GT	2016 6 Hours of The Glen
Pro Mazda	1:43.573	Victor Franzoni	Star Formula Mazda 'Pro'	2017 Watkins Glen Pro Mazda round
GT1 (Prototype)	1:43.580	Thierry Boutsen	Porsche 911 GT1 Evo	1998 Six Hours at the Glen
GT3	1:44.286	Álvaro Parente	Bentley Continental GT3	2019 Watkins Glen GT World Challenge America round
TA1	1:44.419	Matthew Brabham	Ford Mustang Trans-Am	2026 Watkins Glen Trans-Am round
LMP675	1:45.460	Ralf Kelleners	Lola B2K/40	2002 6 Hours of The Glen
Lamborghini Super Trofeo	1:45.672	Loris Spinelli	Lamborghini Huracán Super Trofeo Evo	2021 Watkins Glen Lamborghini Super Trofeo North America round
Ferrari Challenge	1:46.639	Massimo Perrina	Ferrari 296 Challenge	2025 Watkins Glen Ferrari Challenge North America round
US F2000	1:46.785	Rinus VeeKay	Tatuus USF-17	2017 Watkins Glen US F2000 round
GT2	1:47.717	Jean-Philippe Belloc	Chrysler Viper GTS-R	1999 FIA GT Watkins Glen 3 Hours
Porsche Carrera Cup	1:47.765	Tyler Maxson	Porsche 911 (992 II) GT3 Cup	2026 Watkins Glen Porsche Carrera Cup North America round
IMSA GTP Lights	1:48.300	Parker Johnstone	Spice SE90P	1993 Fay's Drugs Weekend at the Glen
IMSA GTS	1:48.833	Darin Brassfield	Oldsmobile Cutlass	1993 Fay's Drugs Weekend at the Glen
GT3 (1998–1999)	1:49.073	Steve Marshall	Porsche 911 Carrera RSR	1998 Six Hours at the Glen
GT1 (GTS)	1:50.423	Chris Bingham	Saleen S7-R	2001 6 Hours of The Glen
TA2	1:50.656	Ethan Tovo	Ford Mustang Trans-Am	2026 Watkins Glen Trans-Am round
American GT	1:50.700	Irv Hoerr	Chevrolet Camaro	2000 6 Hours of The Glen
N-GT	1:51.317	John O'Steen	Porsche 911 GT2	1999 FIA GT Watkins Glen 3 Hours
Barber Pro	1:51.530	Nilton Rossoni	Reynard 98E	1999 Watkins Glen Barber Pro round
GTO	1:51.800	Cort Wagner	Porsche 911 (996) GT2	2000 6 Hours of The Glen
F2000 Championship	1:52.195	Tim Minor	Citation F2000	2014 Watkins Glen F2000 Championship round
GTU	1:54.000	David Murry	Porsche 911 (996) GT3-R	2000 6 Hours of The Glen
GT4	1:54.077	Devin Jones	BMW M4 GT4	2019 Tioga Downs Casino Resort 240 at The Glen
TCR Touring Car	1:56.114	Ryan Eversley	Honda Civic Type R TCR (FL5)	2023 Watkins Glen International 120
IMSA GTO	1:57.100	Brian DeVries	Oldsmobile Cutlass	1994 The Glen Continental
F1600 Championship	1:57.184	Garth Rickards	Mygale SJ 2012	2014 Watkins Glen F1600 Championship round
Mustang Challenge	1:57.507	Devin Anderson	Ford Mustang Dark Horse R	2026 Watkins Glen Mustang Challenge round
IMSA GTU	2:01.420	Butch Leitzinger	Nissan 240SX	1993 Fay's Drugs Weekend at the Glen
Mazda MX-5 Cup	2:09.086	Matthew Dirks	Mazda MX-5 (ND)	2022 Watkins Glen Mazda MX-5 Cup round
IMSA Supercar	2:12.099	Hans-Joachim Stuck	Porsche 911 Turbo (964)	1993 Fay's Drugs Weekend at the Glen
Short Circuit (with Inner Loop Chicane) (1992–present): 2.450 mi (3.943 km)
IMSA GTP	0:59.920	Davy Jones	Jaguar XJR-14	1992 Camel Continental
LMP900	1:03.676	Didier Theys	Dallara SP1	2002 Bully Hill Vineyards 250
DP	1:05.349	Scott Pruett	Riley MkXX	2010 Crown Royal 200 at The Glen
LMP675	1:08.499	Bruno St. Jacques	Lola B2K/40	2001 Bully Hill Vineyards 250
IMSA GTP Lights	1:09.020	Parker Johnstone	Spice SE91P	1992 Camel Continental
NASCAR Cup	1:10.540	Martin Truex Jr.	Toyota Camry	2019 Go Bowling at The Glen
GT1 (GTS)	1:10.939	Ron Johnson	Saleen S7-R	2001 Bully Hill Vineyards 250
GT2	1:11.478	Paul Edwards	Chevrolet Corvette C6.R	2010 Crown Royal 200 at The Glen
NASCAR Truck	1:11.616	Brent Crews	Toyota Tundra TRD Pro	2026 Bully Hill Vineyards 176 at The Glen
NASCAR Xfinity	1:11.830	Justin Allgaier	Chevrolet Camaro SS	2023 Shriners Children's 200 at The Glen
American GT	1:11.899	Chris Bingham	Chevrolet Corvette	2002 Bully Hill Vineyards 250
ARCA Menards	1:13.435	Connor Zilisch	Chevrolet Camaro SS	2023 General Tire 100 at The Glen
GT	1:13.541	Bill Auberlen	Ferrari 360 GT	2002 Bully Hill Vineyards 250
IMSA Supercar	1:23.651	Shawn Hendricks	Nissan 300ZX	1994 Glen Continental
Short Circuit (with Esses Chicane) (1979–1991): 2.428 mi (3.907 km)
IMSA GTP	0:59.920	Davy Jones	Jaguar XJR-16	1991 Camel Continental
IMSA GTP Lights	1:07.060	Parker Johnstone	Spice SE90P	1991 Camel Continental
IMSA Supercar	1:21.350	Hurley Haywood	Porsche 911 Turbo (964)	1991 Camel Continental
Grand Prix Circuit (1971–1974, 1986–1991): 3.377 mi (5.435 km)
IMSA GTP	1:35.600	Chip Robinson	Nissan NPT-90	1990 Camel Continental
Group 7	1:39.571	Mark Donohue	Porsche 917/30 TC	1973 Watkins Glen Can-Am round
Formula One	1:40.608	Carlos Pace	Brabham BT44	1974 United States Grand Prix
F5000	1:41.406	Mario Andretti	Lola T332	1974 Watkins Glen F5000 round
Group 5	1:43.847	François Cevert	Matra-Simca MS670B	1973 Watkins Glen 6 Hours
IMSA GTP Lights	1:45.100	Ruggero Melgrati	Spice SE89P	1990 Camel Continental
IMSA GTO	1:47.150	Hans-Joachim Stuck	Audi 90 Quattro	1990 Kodak Copier 500
IMSA GTU	1:56.050	Bob Leitzinger	Nissan 240SX	1990 Kodak Copier 500
IMSA AAC	1:56.550	Ray Kong	Oldsmobile Cutlass	1991 Camel Continental
Trans-Am	1:58.300	Peter Gregg	Porsche Carrera RSR	1974 Watkins Glen Trans-Am round
Grand Prix Circuit with Esses Chicane (1975–1985): 3.377 mi (5.435 km)
Formula One	1:34.068	Alan Jones	Williams FW07B	1980 United States Grand Prix
F5000	1:39.021	Mario Andretti	Lola T332	1975 Watkins Glen F5000 round
IMSA GTP	1:40.260	Klaus Ludwig	Ford Mustang Probe	1985 Serengeti Drivers New York 500
Can-Am	1:40.746	Geoff Brabham	Lola T530	1981 Watkins Glen Can-Am round
Group 6	1:45.956	Gérard Larrousse	Alpine-Renault A442 Turbo	1975 Watkins Glen 6 Hours
Formula Super Vee	1:48.293	Peter Moodie	Ralt RT5	1984 Watkins Glen SCCA Formula Super Vee round
Sports 2000	1:50.830	Gary Gove	Ralt RT2	1980 Watkins Glen Can-Am round
IMSA GTO	1:51.380	Darin Brassfield	Ford Thunderbird	1985 Serengeti Drivers New York 500
IMSA GTP Lights	1:52.400	Bill Alsup	Royale RP40	1985 Camel Continental
Group 5	1:52.831	John Paul Jr.	Porsche 935 JLP-3	1981 Watkins Glen 6 Hours
Trans-Am	1:54.402	Wally Dallenbach Jr.	Chevrolet Camaro	1984 Watkins Glen Trans-Am round
IMSA GTU	2:00.370	Elliot Forbes-Robinson	Porsche 924 Carrera	1985 Camel Continental
Sports Car Circuit (1971): 2.430 mi (3.911 km)
Group 7 (Can-Am)	1:06.083	Denny Hulme	McLaren M8F	1971 Watkins Glen Can-Am round
Group 5	1:08.297	Derek Bell	Porsche 917K	1971 Watkins Glen 6 Hours
Trans-Am	1:18.196	George Follmer	Ford Mustang Boss 302	1971 Watkins Glen Trans-Am round
Original Grand Prix Circuit (1956–1970): 2.350 mi (3.782 km)
Group 7 (Can-Am)	1:02.600	Denny Hulme	McLaren M8B	1969 Watkins Glen Can-Am round
Formula One	1:02.740	Jacky Ickx	Ferrari 312B	1970 United States Grand Prix
Group 5	1:04.900	Pedro Rodríguez	Porsche 917K	1970 Watkins Glen 6 Hours
Group 6	1:09.130	Vic Elford	Porsche 908/02	1969 Watkins Glen 6 Hours
Group 4	1:11.100	Jacky Ickx	Ford GT40	1968 Watkins Glen 6 Hours
Trans-Am	1:14.650	Parnelli Jones	Ford Mustang Boss 302	1970 Watkins Glen Trans-Am round
Group 3	1:24.800	Ken Miles	Shelby Cobra	1964 Watkins Glen Sports Car Grand Prix
Second Public Road Course (1953–1955): 4.600 mi (7.403 km)
Sports car	3:10.800	Bill Spear	Ferrari 375 MM	1954 Watkins Glen Grand Prix
Original Public Road Course (1948–1952): 6.600 mi (10.622 km)
Formula Libre	5:13.500	Phil Walters	Healey-Cadillac Special	1950 Watkins Glen Grand Prix

== Records ==
Category	Driver(s)	Date	Time
FIA Formula One Qualifying (GP Course)	Bruno Giacomelli	1980	1:33.291 (130.315 mph; 209.722 km/h)
FIA Formula One Race (199.24 miles; 318.784 km)	Alan Jones	1980	1:34:36 (126.367 mph; 203.368 km/h)
FIA Formula One Qualifying (2.35–mile course)	Jacky Ickx	1970	1:03.07 (134.136 mph; 214.617 km/h)
FIA Formula One Race (253.8 miles; 408.2 km)	Emerson Fittipaldi	1970	1:57:33.2 (129.541 mph; 207.265 km/h)
NASCAR Cup Series Qualifying	Marcos Ambrose	2014	1:08.113 seconds (129.491 mph; 208.355 km/h)
NASCAR Cup Series Race (220.5 miles; 354.860 km)	William Byron	2023	1:58:44 (111.426 mph; 179.430 km/h)
NASCAR Xfinity Series Qualifying	William Byron	2022	1:10.548 (125.021 mph; 197.266 km/h)
NASCAR Xfinity Series Race (200.9 miles; 323.317 km)	Terry Labonte	1996	2:11:47 (91.468 mph; 146.348 km/h)
NASCAR Craftsman Truck Series Qualifying	Brent Crews	2026	1:10.222 (125.602 mph; 202.137 km/h)
World Sportscar Championship (qualifying)	Brian Redman	1970	1:06.3
World Sportscar Championship (fastest lap)	Pedro Rodriguez	1970	1:04.9
FIA GT Championship (qualifying)	Olivier Beretta	1999	1:47.576
FIA GT Championship (fastest lap)	Olivier Beretta	1999	1:47.717
IndyCar Series Qualifying (GP Course)	Scott Dixon	2017	1:22.4171 (147.202 mph; 236.898 km/h)
Indy Lights Qualifying (GP Course)	Santiago Urrutia	2016	131.278 mph (211.271 km/h)
IMSA WeatherTech Championship Qualifying (DPi, GP Course)	Tom Blomqvist	2022	1:29.580
IMSA WeatherTech Championship Qualifying (P, GP Course)	Luis Felipe Derani	2017	1:34.405
IMSA SportsCar Championship Qualifying (LMP2, GP Course)	Ben Keating	2022	1:33.930
IMSA SportsCar Championship Qualifying (PC, GP Course)	James French	2017	1:40.049
IMSA SportsCar Championship Qualifying (LMP3, GP Course)	Nicolás Varrone	2022	1:40.028
IMSA SportsCar Championship Qualifying (GTLM, GP Course)	Antonio García	2021	1:40.944
IMSA SportsCar Championship Qualifying (GTD, GP Course)	Jack Hawksworth	2026	1:43.701
IMSA SportsCar Championship Fastest Race Lap (DPi, GP Course)	Olivier Pla	2019	1:29.657
IMSA SportsCar Championship Fastest Race Lap (LMP2, GP Course)	Gabriel Aubry	2021	1:32.918
IMSA SportsCar Championship Fastest Race Lap (LMP3, GP Course)	Colin Braun	2021	1:39.967
IMSA SportsCar Championship Fastest Race Lap (GTLM, GP Course)	Antonio García	2019	1:41.563
IMSA SportsCar Championship Fastest Race Lap (GTD, GP Course)	Jack Hawksworth	2017	1:44.786
IMSA SportsCar Championship Race (6 Hours, GP Course)	João Barbosa/Christian Fittipaldi/Felipe Albuquerque	2017	200 laps, 680 mi (112.922 mph; 181.730 km/h)
Grand Am Rolex Sports Car Series (Short Course) Qualifying	Jon Fogarty	2007	1:07.020 (131.603 mph; 211.794 km/h)
Grand-Am Crown Royal 200 at the Glen	Brian Frisselle	2008	1:05.243
Barber Saab Pro Series Qualifying (2.35–mile course)	Rino Mastronardi	1997	1:15.041
Barber Saab Pro Series Race	Derek Hill	1997	1:15.296
Atlantic Championship Race	Jimmy Simpson	2014	1:40.634

=== NASCAR Cup Series records ===
Most wins	5	Tony Stewart
Most top 5s	12	Mark Martin
Most top 10s	16	Mark Martin
Starts	24	Jeff Gordon
Poles	4	Jeff Gordon
Most laps completed	2,075	Jeff Gordon
Most laps led	262	Jeff Gordon
Avg. start*	5.9	Tony Stewart
Avg. finish*	8.9	Carl Edwards

* from minimum 10 starts.

== See also ==
- List of Formula One circuits
- List of Champ Car circuits
- List of NASCAR race tracks
