= 1998 Six Hours at the Glen =

Track map of Watkins Glen International.

The 1998 6 Hours of the Glen (formally known as the First Union 6 Hours of the Glen) was the fifth and final race for the 1998 United States Road Racing Championship season. It took place on August 23, 1998, at Watkins Glen International.

== Official results ==
Class winners in bold.

Pos	Class	No	Team	Drivers	Chassis	Tyre	Laps
Pos	Class	No	Team	Drivers	Engine	Tyre	Laps
1	**CA**	**30**	**(Italy) Moretti/Doran Racing**	**(Italy) Giampiero Moretti** **(Italy) Mauro Baldi** **(Belgium) Didier Theys**	**Ferrari 333 SP**	**Y**	**171**
1	**CA**	**30**	**(Italy) Moretti/Doran Racing**	**(Italy) Giampiero Moretti** **(Italy) Mauro Baldi** **(Belgium) Didier Theys**	**Ferrari F310E 4.0L V12**	**Y**	**171**
2	CA	16	(United States) Dyson Racing	(United States) Butch Leitzinger (United Kingdom) James Weaver (United States) Elliot Forbes-Robinson	Riley & Scott Mk III	**G**	171
2	CA	16	(United States) Dyson Racing	(United States) Butch Leitzinger (United Kingdom) James Weaver (United States) Elliot Forbes-Robinson	Ford 5.0L V8	**G**	171
3	**GT1**	**38**	**(United States) Champion Motors**	**(Belgium) Thierry Boutsen** **(Germany) Ralf Kelleners**	**Porsche 911 GT1 Evo**	**P**	**171**
3	**GT1**	**38**	**(United States) Champion Motors**	**(Belgium) Thierry Boutsen** **(Germany) Ralf Kelleners**	**Porsche 3.2 L Turbo Flat-6**	**P**	**171**
4	GT1	5	(United States) Panoz-Visteon Racing	(Brazil) Raul Boesel (France) Eric Bernard	Panoz GTR-1	**MI**	170
4	GT1	5	(United States) Panoz-Visteon Racing	(Brazil) Raul Boesel (France) Eric Bernard	Ford (Roush) 6.0 L V8	**MI**	170
5	CA	36	(United States) Matthews-Colucci Racing	(United States) Jim Matthews (United States) Barry Waddell (United States) Tom Kendall	Riley & Scott Mk III	**P**	169
5	CA	36	(United States) Matthews-Colucci Racing	(United States) Jim Matthews (United States) Barry Waddell (United States) Tom Kendall	Ford 5.0 L V8	**P**	169
6	CA	39	(United States) Matthews-Colucci Racing	(United States) David Murry (Sweden) Stefan Johansson (United States) Hurley Haywood	Riley & Scott Mk III	**P**	169
6	CA	39	(United States) Matthews-Colucci Racing	(United States) David Murry (Sweden) Stefan Johansson (United States) Hurley Haywood	Ford 5.0 L V8	**P**	169
7	CA	8	(United States) Transatlantic Racing	(United States) Henry Camferdam (United States) Scott Schubot (Australia) David Besnard	Riley & Scott Mk III	**D**	166
7	CA	8	(United States) Transatlantic Racing	(United States) Henry Camferdam (United States) Scott Schubot (Australia) David Besnard	Ford 5.0 L V8	**D**	166
8	CA	28	(United States) Intersport Racing	(United States) Jon Field (United States) Rick Sutherland	Riley & Scott Mk III	**G**	163
8	CA	28	(United States) Intersport Racing	(United States) Jon Field (United States) Rick Sutherland	Ford 5.0 L V8	**G**	163
9	CA	63	(United States) Downing/Atlanta	(United States) Howard Katz (United States) Jim Downing (United States) Rich Grupp	Kudzu DLM-4	**G**	162
9	CA	63	(United States) Downing/Atlanta	(United States) Howard Katz (United States) Jim Downing (United States) Rich Grupp	Mazda R26B 2.6 L 4-Rotor	**G**	162
10	CA	88	(United States) Dollahite Racing	(United States) Bill Dollahite (United States) Mike Davies (Canada) Claude Bourbonnais	Ferrari 333 SP	**P**	161
10	CA	88	(United States) Dollahite Racing	(United States) Bill Dollahite (United States) Mike Davies (Canada) Claude Bourbonnais	Ferrari F310E 4.0L V12	**P**	161
11	CA	20	(United States) Dyson Racing	(United States) Dorsey Schroeder (United States) Rob Dyson (United States) John Paul Jr.	Riley & Scott Mk III	**G**	160
11	CA	20	(United States) Dyson Racing	(United States) Dorsey Schroeder (United States) Rob Dyson (United States) John Paul Jr.	Ford 5.0 L V8	**G**	160
12	CA	92	(United States) Denaba Racing	(United States) A.J. Smith (United States) Joaquin DeSoto	Kudzu DLM	?	155
12	CA	92	(United States) Denaba Racing	(United States) A.J. Smith (United States) Joaquin DeSoto	Buick 4.5 L V6	?	155
13	**GT3**	**22**	**(United States) Alex Job Racing**	**(United States) Randy Pobst** **(United States) Terry Borcheller**	**Porsche 911 Carrera RSR**	**P**	**155**
13	**GT3**	**22**	**(United States) Alex Job Racing**	**(United States) Randy Pobst** **(United States) Terry Borcheller**	**Porsche 3.8 L Flat-6**	**P**	**155**
14	GT3	23	(United States) Alex Job Racing	(United States) Cort Wagner (United States) Darryl Havens (United States) Kelly Collins	Porsche 911 Carrera RSR	**P**	154
14	GT3	23	(United States) Alex Job Racing	(United States) Cort Wagner (United States) Darryl Havens (United States) Kelly Collins	Porsche 3.8 L Flat-6	**P**	154
15	GT3	6	(United States) Prototype Technology Group	(Belgium) Marc Duez (Canada) Ross Bentley (United States) Peter Cunningham	BMW M3	**Y**	152
15	GT3	6	(United States) Prototype Technology Group	(Belgium) Marc Duez (Canada) Ross Bentley (United States) Peter Cunningham	BMW 3.2 L I6	**Y**	152
16	**GT2**	**25**	**(United States) Alex Job Racing**	**(Italy) Angelo Cilli** **(United States) Dale White** **(United States) 'Trip' Goolsby**	**Porsche 911 Carrera RSR**	**P**	**149**
16	**GT2**	**25**	**(United States) Alex Job Racing**	**(Italy) Angelo Cilli** **(United States) Dale White** **(United States) 'Trip' Goolsby**	**Porsche 3.8 L Flat-6**	**P**	**149**
17	GT1	91	(United States) Rock Valley Racing	(United States) Roger Schramm (United States) Stu Hayner	Chevrolet Camaro	**G**	148
17	GT1	91	(United States) Rock Valley Racing	(United States) Roger Schramm (United States) Stu Hayner	Chevrolet ? L V8	**G**	148
18	GT3	98	(United States) North American Marien Group	(United States) Spencer Pumpelly (United States) David Kicak (United States) Oma Kimbrough	Porsche 911 Carrera RSR	?	147
18	GT3	98	(United States) North American Marien Group	(United States) Spencer Pumpelly (United States) David Kicak (United States) Oma Kimbrough	Porsche 3.8 L Flat-6	?	147
19	GT1	2	(United States) Mosler Automotive	(United States) Shane Lewis (United States) Vic Rice	Mosler Raptor	**P**	144
19	GT1	2	(United States) Mosler Automotive	(United States) Shane Lewis (United States) Vic Rice	Chevrolet 6.3 L V8	**P**	144
20 DNF	GT2	99	(United States) Schumacher Racing	(United States) Larry Schumacher (United States) John O'Steen	Porsche 911 GT2	**P**	142
20 DNF	GT2	99	(United States) Schumacher Racing	(United States) Larry Schumacher (United States) John O'Steen	Porsche 3.6 L Turbo Flat-6	**P**	142
21 DNF	GT3	57	(United States) Kryderacing	(United States) Reed Kryder (United States) Steve Ahlgrim (United States) Alistair Oag	Nissan 240SX	?	108
21 DNF	GT3	57	(United States) Kryderacing	(United States) Reed Kryder (United States) Steve Ahlgrim (United States) Alistair Oag	Nissan ? L V6	?	108
22	GT2	75	(United States) Pettit Racing	(United States) Cameron Worth (United States) Scott Sansone	Mazda RX-7	**HO**	108
22	GT2	75	(United States) Pettit Racing	(United States) Cameron Worth (United States) Scott Sansone	Mazda 2.0 L Turbo 3-Rotor	**HO**	108
23	GT2	78	(United States) Mostly Mazda	(United States) Brian Richards (United Kingdom) Michael DeFontes	Mazda RX-7	?	101
23	GT2	78	(United States) Mostly Mazda	(United States) Brian Richards (United Kingdom) Michael DeFontes	Mazda 2.0 L 3-Rotor	?	101
24 DNF	GT3	86	(United States) G&W Motorsports	(Canada) Sylvain Tremblay (United States) Steve Marshall	Porsche 911 GT2	**P**	72
24 DNF	GT3	86	(United States) G&W Motorsports	(Canada) Sylvain Tremblay (United States) Steve Marshall	Porsche 3.6 L Flat-6	**P**	72
25 DNF	GT1	53	(United States) Diablo Racing	(United States) Tom Scheuren (United States) Gerry Green (United States) Bobby Jones	Chevrolet Camaro	**G**	71
25 DNF	GT1	53	(United States) Diablo Racing	(United States) Tom Scheuren (United States) Gerry Green (United States) Bobby Jones	Chevrolet ? L V8	**G**	71
26 DNF	GT3	10	(United States) Prototype Technology Group	(United States) Bill Auberlen (United States) Mark Simo	BMW M3	**Y**	49
26 DNF	GT3	10	(United States) Prototype Technology Group	(United States) Bill Auberlen (United States) Mark Simo	BMW 3.2 L I6	**Y**	49
27 DNF	GT3	07	(United States) G&W Motorsports	(United States) Darren Law (United States) Danny Marshall	Porsche 911 GT2	**P**	39
27 DNF	GT3	07	(United States) G&W Motorsports	(United States) Darren Law (United States) Danny Marshall	Porsche 3.6 L Flat-6	**P**	39
28 DNF	CA	29	(United States) Intersport Racing	(United States) John Mirro	Riley & Scott Mk III	**G**	22
28 DNF	CA	29	(United States) Intersport Racing	(United States) John Mirro	Ford 5.0 L V8	**G**	22
29 DNF	GT2	37	(United States) GTR Motorsports	(United States) Bob Strange	Porsche 968	**D**	8
29 DNF	GT2	37	(United States) GTR Motorsports	(United States) Bob Strange	Porsche 3.0 L I4	**D**	8
30 DNF	GT1	4	(United States) Panoz-Visteon Racing	(Australia) David Brabham	Panoz GTR-1	**MI**	7
30 DNF	GT1	4	(United States) Panoz-Visteon Racing	(Australia) David Brabham	Ford (Roush) 6.0 L V8	**MI**	7
31 DNF	GT3	76	(United States) Team A.R.E.	(United States) Peter Argetsinger	Porsche 911 Carrera RSR	**Y**	6
31 DNF	GT3	76	(United States) Team A.R.E.	(United States) Peter Argetsinger	Porsche 3.8 L Flat-6	**Y**	6
32 DNF	CA	95	(United States) TRV Motorsport	(United States) Jeret Schroeder	Kudzu DL-4	**G**	1
32 DNF	CA	95	(United States) TRV Motorsport	(United States) Jeret Schroeder	Chevrolet 6.0 L V8	**G**	1
33 DNS	GT3	33	(United States) Phoenix Racing	(United States) Steve McNeely (United States) Jim Michealian (United States) Joe Aquilante	Pontiac Firebird	?	0
33 DNS	GT3	33	(United States) Phoenix Racing	(United States) Steve McNeely (United States) Jim Michealian (United States) Joe Aquilante	Pontiac ? L V8	?	0

=== Statistics ===
- Pole Position - #20 Dyson Racing - 1:39.171
- Fastest lap - #16 Dyson Racing - 1:40.872
- Average Speed - 98.129 mph
