= 2023 MotoAmerica Twins Championship =

The 2023 MotoAmerica Twins Championship season was the 6th season of the Twins Cup class in MotoAmerica competition.

== Calendar and results ==
Round	Circuit	Date	Race 1 Winner	Race 2 Winner
1	(Florida) Daytona International Speedway	March 9–12	(United States) Gus Rodio	(United States) Stefano Mesa
2	(Georgia (U.S. state)) Michelin Raceway Road Atlanta	April 21–23	(United States) Blake Davis	(United States) Rocco Landers
3	(Alabama) Barber Motorsports Park	May 19–21	(United States) Rocco Landers	(United States) Rocco Landers
4	(Wisconsin) Road America	June 10–12	(No event)	(No event)
5	(Washington (state)) The Ridge Motorsports Park	June 23–25	(United States) Dominic Doyle	(United States) Rocco Landers
6	(California) WeatherTech Raceway Laguna Seca	July 6–8	(United States) Rocco Landers	(United States) Gus Rodio
7	(Minnesota) Brainerd International Raceway	July 29–31	(No event)	(No event)
8	(Pennsylvania) Pittsburgh International Race Complex	August 18–20	(United States) Rocco Landers	(United States) Gus Rodio
9	(Texas) Circuit of the Americas	September 6–8	(No event)	(No event)
10	New Jersey Motorsports Park	September 22–24	(United States) Blake Davis	(United States) Blake Davis

== Teams and riders ==
2022 Entry List
Team	Constructor	No.	Rider	Rounds
3D Motorsports	Aprilia	14	(United States) Chase Black	1
3D Motorsports	Aprilia	21	(United States) Jacob Crossman	All
3D Motorsports	Yamaha	191	(United States) Jeff Bean	2, 3, 4, 5
Aldrich Racing Team	Aprilia	527	(United States) Nathan Aldrich	4
Altus Motorsports	Yamaha	34	(United States) Cody Wyman	1, 2, 6
Altus Motorsports	Yamaha	62	(United States) Joseph LiMandri Jr	1, 2, 3, 4, 5
Bad Boys Racing	Yamaha	99	(United States) Avery Dreher	7
Blackmon Racing	Yamaha	18	(United States) Jackson Blackmon	All
Blackmon Racing	Yamaha	159	(Italy) Giacomo Manera	6
BrownTown Racing	Aprilia	186	(United States) Chase Brown	2, 3, 6, 7
BrownTown Racing	Suzuki	187	(United States) Reese Brown	3, 6
CarbonSmith	Aprilia	934	(United States) Ryan Smith	1, 3, 5
Carson Racing	Suzuki	754	(United States) Ryan Carson	6
Ceparano Racing	Aprilia	710	(United States) Thomas Ceparano	3
Chiefs Racing Team	Suzuki	996	(United States) Greg Reisinger	6
Chiefs Racing Team	Yamaha	67	(United States) Cassidy Heiser	2, 3, 6, 7
Cycle Tech	Yamaha	49	(United States) Hayden Schultz	All
Duffy Racing	Aprilia	422	(United States) Tyler Duffy	1, 4, 5, 7
Filice Vinedi Racing	Kawasaki	17	(United States) Justin Filice	1
First XV Racing	Yamaha	75	(United States) Cliff Ramsdell	5
GERT Racing Team	Aprilia	989	(United States) Savannah Jaska	5
Ghetto Customs	Yamaha	128	(United States) Chris Parrish	1, 2, 3, 4, 5, 6
Giaccmoto Yamaha Racing	Yamaha	700	(United Kingdom) Edward Sullivan	1
Joe Rocco Racing	Aprilia	526	(United States) Joe Cupido	2
JoeyO Racing	Yamaha	50	(United States) Bobby Bettencourt	1
JPH Suspension/WonderCBD Racing	Yamaha	420	(United States) Christian Maronian	5
Kayes Kustom Cycles	Kawasaki	688	(United States) Eddie Kaye	3
KingsKamp.com Racing	Yamaha	23	(United States) Gino Angella	1, 3
Kruser Racing	Aprilia	719	(United States) Joshua Kruse	7
Legacy Dental	Yamaha	31	(United States) Jeffrey Purk	All
Legacy Dental/Poly Evolution	Yamaha	31	(United States) Jeffrey Purk	All
Lucky 13	Aprilia	13	(United States) Wesley Lakis	4
MonkMoto	Suzuki	46	(United States) Logan Monk	7
Möth Touch	Suzuki	899	(United States) Alexander Steinhoff-Arnot	3, 6
Motorcycle Upholstery	Aprilia	333	(United States) Jaycee Sterling	5
MP13 Racing	Yamaha	131	(United States) Kayla Yaakov	3, 4, 5, 6
N2 Racing/BobbleHeadMoto	Yamaha	1	(United States) Blake Davis	All
NJB Racing	Yamaha	142	(United States) Jamie Bishop	1
Optimum Performance Motorsports	Aprilia	11	(United States) Jody Barry	1, 2
Pistris Racing	Aprilia	173	(United States) Brad Faas	1, 2, 6
Plastic Surgery Racing	Aprilia	532	(United States) Carl Price	5
Pure Attitude Racing	Yamaha	16	(United States) Trevor Standish	1, 2
Reed Racing 323	Yamaha	323	(United States) Eric Reed	1, 3
RF Racing	Yamaha	118	(United States) Anthony Bangma	6
Righteous Racing	Aprilia	171	(United States) Ray Hofman	1, 2, 3, 4, 5, 7
Robem Engineering	Aprilia	72	(United States) Ben Gloddy	1, 7
Robem Engineering	Aprilia	97	(United States) Rocco Landers	2, 3, 4, 5, 6, 7
Rodio Racing	Aprilia	96	(United States) Gus Rodio	All
Ruthless Racing	Yamaha	229	(Canada) Darren James	1, 2, 3
SP8S Racing	Aprilia	138	(United States) Chris Speights	6, 7
SP8S Racing	Suzuki	728	(United States) Jerry Reeves	4, 5, 6
Syndicate Racing	Yamaha	213	(United States) Jason Madama	3
TCB Racing	Suzuki	413	(United States) Brogan Richards	2, 3
Team ISO	Yamaha	25	(South Africa) Dominic Doyle	All
Team ISO Racing	Yamaha	32	(United States) Dallas Daniels	7
Team JBR	Aprilia	918	(United States) Josef Bittner	2, 3
Ten Racing/MotoShippers	Yamaha	10	(United States) Brett Donahue	1, 2
The WagBar MP13 Racing Team	Yamaha	131	(United States) Kayla Yaakov	3, 4, 5, 6
TigerTail Racing	Yamaha	24	(United States) Adam Faussett	4
Top Pro Motorsports	Aprilia	103	(United States) Alex Arango	1, 2, 3, 4, 5, 6
Top Pro Motorsports	Aprilia	111	(Colombia) Agustin Sierra	3, 4, 5, 6, 7
Trackday Winner/Blackmon Racing	Yamaha	18	(United States) Jackson Blackmon	All
Triplestrong/Bartcon Racing	Yamaha	65	(United States) Spencer Humphreys	6, 7
Unreal Racing	Aprilia	195	(United States) Daniel Garver	2, 3, 7
Unreal Racing	Aprilia	295	(United States) Evan Garver	3
Vestment Realty Powered By Realty One Group	Yamaha	310	(United States) Rodney Vest	1, 3, 6
Vestment Realty Powered By Realty One Group	Yamaha	310	(United States) Rodney Vest	1, 3, 6
Wolfe Racing	Suzuki	606	(United States) Ryan Wolfe	2, 3, 6, 7
Wrench Motorcycles	Yamaha	34	(United States) Cody Wyman	1, 2, 6
Wrench Motorcycles	Yamaha	43	(United States) Brenden Ketelsen	4, 5, 6
Zone 9 Racing/EDR Performance	Aprilia	188	(United States) Luke Luciano	4, 5

== Championship standings ==
Scoring system

Points are awarded to the top fifteen finishers. A rider has to finish the race to earn points.

Position	1st	2nd	3rd	4th	5th	6th	7th	8th	9th	10th	11th	12th	13th	14th	15th
Points	25	20	16	13	11	10	9	8	7	6	5	4	3	2	1

Pos	Rider	Bike	DAY (Florida)		RAT (Georgia (U.S. state))		ALA (Alabama)		RID (Washington (state))		MON (California)		PIT (Pennsylvania)		NJE (New Jersey)		Pts
Pos	Rider	Bike	R1	R2	R1	R2	R1	R2	R1	R2	R1	R2	R1	R2	R1	R2	Pts
1	(United States) Blake Davis	Yamaha	4	4	1	11	5	2	2	2	4	3	2	3	1	1	242
2	(United States) Gus Rodio	Aprilia	1	2	2	2		Ret	4	3	2	1	3	1	3	Ret	216
3	(United States) Rocco Landers	Aprilia			Ret	1	1	1	3	1	1	Ret	1	2	5	7	206
4	(South Africa) Dominic Doyle	Yamaha	Ret	Ret	6	6	3	13	1	5	3	5	4	6	2	3	161
5	(United States) Jackson Blackmon	Yamaha	2	3	4	Ret	6	8	5	7	5	6	5	4	8	Ret	140
6	(United States) Hayden Schultz	Yamaha	3	5	3	3	4	4	Ret	6	Ret	7	Ret	9	6	4	134
7	(United States) Kayla Yaakov	Yamaha					2	3	6	4	19	4	6	5			93
8	(United States) Chris Parrish	Yamaha	9	10	8	7	8	6	16	11	9	9	9	13			77
9	(United States) Joseph LiMandri Jr	Yamaha	7	6	Ret	5	10	7	7	8	Ret	10					68
10	(United States) Cassidy Heiser	Yamaha			7	8	7	5					8	8	Ret	DNS	53
11	(United States) Ray Hofman	Aprilia	Ret	11	10	10	9	9	10	13	8	Ret			Ret	13	51
12	(United States) Stefano Mesa	Yamaha	Ret	1	5	4											49
13	(United States) Filippo Rovelli	Yamaha									Ret	2			13	2	43
14	(United States) Alex Arango	Aprilia	12	12	Ret	Ret	DNS	DNS	8	10	10	11	13	15			37
15	(United States) Jacob Crossman	Aprilia	Ret	15	15	15	11	15	11	9	Ret	13	16	14	14	11	33
16	(United States) Daniel Garver	Aprilia			11	9		10							11	8	31
17	(United States) Spencer Humphreys	Yamaha											7	7	10	9	31
18	(United States) Brenden Ketelsen	Yamaha								12	6	8	12	11			31
19	(Canada) Darren James	Yamaha	10	8	13	13	12	12									28
20	(United States) Chase Brown	Aprilia			12	12	14	11					10	10	17	DNS	27
21	(United States) Ben Gloddy	Aprilia	Ret												4	5	24
22	(United States) Cody Wyman	Yamaha	8	9	9								Ret	Ret			22
23	(United States) Ryan Wolfe	Suzuki			17	17	DNS	14					11	12	7	DNS	20
24	(United States) Tyler Duffy	Aprilia	16	14					9		7	Ret			15	15	20
25	(United States) Jody Barry	Aprilia	6	7	Ret	Ret											19
26	(United States) Jeffrey Purk	Yamaha	15	Ret	16	16	13	16	12	17	11	12	17	19	18	16	17
27	(United States) Dallas Daniels	Yamaha													12	6	14
28	(United Kingdom) Edward Sullivan	Yamaha	5	Ret													11
29	(United States) Liam MacDonald	Yamaha													9	12	11
30	(United States) Trevor Standish	Yamaha	13	13	14	14											10
31	(Colombia) Agustin Sierra	Aprilia					19	20	Ret	Ret	12	Ret	14	16	16	DNS	6
32	(United States) Logan Monk	Suzuki													Ret	10	6
33	(United States) Brett Donahue	Yamaha	11	Ret	Ret	Ret											5
34	(United States) Luke Luciano	Aprilia							Ret	Ret	13	14					5
35	(United States) Adam Faussett	Yamaha							13	15							4
36	(United States) Jeff Bean	Yamaha			19	18	15	17	15	19		DNS					2
37	(United States) Joshua Kruse	Aprilia													Ret	14	2
38	(United States) Nathan Aldrich	Aprilia							17	14							2
39	(United States) Wesley Lakis	Aprilia							14	16							2
40	(United States) Jamie Bishop	Yamaha	14	17													2
41	(United States) Christian Maronian	Yamaha									14	19					2
42	(United States) Carl Price	Aprilia									16	15					1
43	(United States) Anthony Bangma	Yamaha											15	17			1
44	(United States) Jerry Reeves	Suzuki							18	18	15	18	Ret	18			1
45	(United States) Aiden Sneed	Yamaha													Ret	DNS	0
46	(Italy) Giacomo Manera	Yamaha											DNS	Ret			0
47	(United States) Cliff Ramsdell	Yamaha									Ret	DNS					0
48	(United States) Joe Cupido	Aprilia			Ret	Ret											0
49	(United States) Ryan Smith	Aprilia	17	19			17	18			Ret	DNS					0
50	(United States) Savannah Jaska	Aprilia									18	16					0
51	(United States) Chase Black	Aprilia	20	16													0
52	(United States) Chris Speights	Aprilia											18	21	Ret	17	0
53	(United States) Jaycee Sterling	Aprilia									17	17					0
54	(United States) Justin Filice	Kawasaki	18	18													0
55	(United States) Avery Dreher	Yamaha													Ret	DNS	0
56	(United States) Alexander Steinhoff-Arnot	Suzuki					20	19					Ret	20			0
57	(United States) Ryan Carson	Suzuki											20	23			0
58	(United States) Brad Faas	Aprilia	19	21	21	19							21	24			0
59	(United States) Jason Madama	Yamaha					16	21									0
60	(United States) Josef Bittner	Aprilia			18	21	18	22									0
61	(United States) Evan Garver	Aprilia					23	23									0
62	(United States) Bobby Bettencourt	Yamaha	21	23													0
63	(United States) Reese Brown	Suzuki						24					19	22			0
64	(United States) Rodney Vest	Yamaha	22	22			22	25					23	25			0
65	(United States) Greg Reisinger	Suzuki											22	26			0
66	(United States) Eric Reed	Yamaha	Ret				24	26									0
67	(United States) Brogan Richards	Suzuki			20	20	21	27									0
68	(United States) Thomas Ceparano	Aprilia						28									0
69	(United States) Gino Angella	Yamaha	Ret	20			25	29									0
70	(United States) Eddie Kaye	Kawasaki					Ret	30									0
Pos	Rider	Bike	DAY (Florida)		RAT (Georgia (U.S. state))		ALA (Alabama)		RID (Washington (state))		MON (California)		PIT (Pennsylvania)		NJE (New Jersey)		Pts
