= 1998 Grand Prix of Road Atlanta =

Track map of Road Atlanta

The 1998 Sports Car Grand Prix of Road Atlanta was the fourth race for the 1998 IMSA GT Championship season. It took place on June 21, 1998, at Road Atlanta and ran for three hours and 45 minutes.

== Official results ==
Class winners in bold.

Pos	Class	No	Team	Drivers	Chassis	Tyre	Laps
Pos	Class	No	Team	Drivers	Engine	Tyre	Laps
1	**WSC**	**16**	**(United States) Dyson Racing**	**(United Kingdom) James Weaver** **(United States) Butch Leitzinger**	**Riley & Scott Mk III**	**G**	**162**
1	**WSC**	**16**	**(United States) Dyson Racing**	**(United Kingdom) James Weaver** **(United States) Butch Leitzinger**	**Ford 5.0 L V8**	**G**	**162**
2	WSC	20	(United States) Dyson Racing	(United States) Dorsey Schroeder (United States) Elliott Forbes-Robinson	Riley & Scott Mk III	**G**	162
2	WSC	20	(United States) Dyson Racing	(United States) Dorsey Schroeder (United States) Elliott Forbes-Robinson	Ford 5.0 L V8	**G**	162
3	**GT1**	**38**	**(United States) Champion Motors**	**(Belgium) Thierry Boutsen** **(France) Bob Wollek**	**Porsche 911 GT1 Evo**	**MI**	**160**
3	**GT1**	**38**	**(United States) Champion Motors**	**(Belgium) Thierry Boutsen** **(France) Bob Wollek**	**Porsche 3.2 L Turbo Flat-6**	**MI**	**160**
4	WSC	7	(United States) Doyle-Risi Racing	(Belgium) Eric van de Poele (South Africa) Wayne Taylor	Ferrari 333 SP	**P**	158
4	WSC	7	(United States) Doyle-Risi Racing	(Belgium) Eric van de Poele (South Africa) Wayne Taylor	Ferrari F310E 4.0 L V12	**P**	158
5	WSC	8	(United States) Transatlantic Racing Services	(United States) Scott Schubot (United States) Henry Camferdam	Riley & Scott Mk III	**D**	152
5	WSC	8	(United States) Transatlantic Racing Services	(United States) Scott Schubot (United States) Henry Camferdam	Ford 5.0 L V8	**D**	152
6	WSC	36	(United States) Matthews-Colucci Racing	(United States) Barry Waddell (United States) Jim Matthews	Riley & Scott Mk III	**P**	151
6	WSC	36	(United States) Matthews-Colucci Racing	(United States) Barry Waddell (United States) Jim Matthews	Ford 5.0 L V8	**P**	151
7	WSC	63	(United States) Downing Atlanta	(United States) Howard Katz (United States) Jim Downing	Kudzu DLM-4	**G**	145
7	WSC	63	(United States) Downing Atlanta	(United States) Howard Katz (United States) Jim Downing	Mazda R26B 2.6 L 4-Rotor	**G**	145
8	GT1	5	(United States) Panoz Motorsports	(Brazil) Raul Boesel (France) Éric Bernard	Panoz GTR-1	**MI**	144
8	GT1	5	(United States) Panoz Motorsports	(Brazil) Raul Boesel (France) Éric Bernard	Ford (Roush) 6.0 L V8	**MI**	144
9	WSC	62	(United States) Downing Atlanta	(United States) Paul Debban (United States) Dennis Spencer	Kudzu DLM	**G**	144
9	WSC	62	(United States) Downing Atlanta	(United States) Paul Debban (United States) Dennis Spencer	Mazda R26B 2.6 L 4-Rotor	**G**	144
10	**GT2**	**6**	**(United States) Prototype Technology Group**	**(Belgium) Marc Duez** **(United States) Boris Said** **(United States) Mark Simo**	**BMW M3**	**Y**	**144**
10	**GT2**	**6**	**(United States) Prototype Technology Group**	**(Belgium) Marc Duez** **(United States) Boris Said** **(United States) Mark Simo**	**BMW 3.2 L I6**	**Y**	**144**
11	GT2	99	(United States) Schumacher Racing	(United States) Larry Schumacher (United States) John O'Steen (United Kingdom) Andy Pilgrim	Porsche 911 GT2	**P**	143
11	GT2	99	(United States) Schumacher Racing	(United States) Larry Schumacher (United States) John O'Steen (United Kingdom) Andy Pilgrim	Porsche 3.6 L Flat-6	**P**	143
12 DNF	WSC	39	(United States) Matthews-Colucci Racing	(United States) David Murry (Sweden) Stefan Johansson	Riley & Scott Mk III	**P**	142
12 DNF	WSC	39	(United States) Matthews-Colucci Racing	(United States) David Murry (Sweden) Stefan Johansson	Ford 5.0 L V8	**P**	142
13	**GT3**	**10**	**(United States) Prototype Technology Group**	**(United States) Bill Auberlen** **(United States) Mark Simo**	**BMW M3**	**Y**	**141**
13	**GT3**	**10**	**(United States) Prototype Technology Group**	**(United States) Bill Auberlen** **(United States) Mark Simo**	**BMW 3.2 L I6**	**Y**	**141**
14	GT3	1	(United States) Prototype Technology Group	(Canada) Ross Bentley (United States) Peter Cunningham	BMW M3	**Y**	140
14	GT3	1	(United States) Prototype Technology Group	(Canada) Ross Bentley (United States) Peter Cunningham	BMW 3.2 L I6	**Y**	140
15 DNF	WSC	12	(United States) Genesis Racing	(United States) Chuck Goldsborough (United States) Rick Fairbanks (United States) Jeff Glenn	Hawk MD3R	**G**	133
15 DNF	WSC	12	(United States) Genesis Racing	(United States) Chuck Goldsborough (United States) Rick Fairbanks (United States) Jeff Glenn	Chevrolet 6.0 L V8	**G**	133
16 DNF	WSC	27	(United States) Doran Enterprises, Inc.	(Belgium) Didier Theys (Switzerland) Fredy Lienhard	Ferrari 333 SP	**Y**	105
16 DNF	WSC	27	(United States) Doran Enterprises, Inc.	(Belgium) Didier Theys (Switzerland) Fredy Lienhard	Ferrari F310E 4.0 L V12	**Y**	105
17 DNF	GT1	45	(United States) Panoz Motorsports	(United States) Johnny O'Connell (United States) Doc Bundy	Panoz GTR-1	**MI**	99
17 DNF	GT1	45	(United States) Panoz Motorsports	(United States) Johnny O'Connell (United States) Doc Bundy	Ford (Roush) 6.0 L V8	**MI**	99
18 DNF	GT3	86	(United States) G&W Motorsport	(United States) Cort Wagner (United States) Mike Fitzgerald	Porsche 911 Carrera RSR	?	74
18 DNF	GT3	86	(United States) G&W Motorsport	(United States) Cort Wagner (United States) Mike Fitzgerald	Porsche 3.8 L Flat-6	?	74
19 DNF	GT2	15	(United States) Jon Lewis	(United States) Kevin Allen (United States) Randy Pobst	Vector M12	**G**	43
19 DNF	GT2	15	(United States) Jon Lewis	(United States) Kevin Allen (United States) Randy Pobst	Lamborghini 5.7 L V12	**G**	43
20 DNF	WSC	28	(United States) Intersport Racing	(United States) Jon Field (United States) Rick Sutherland	Riley & Scott Mk III	**G**	37
20 DNF	WSC	28	(United States) Intersport Racing	(United States) Jon Field (United States) Rick Sutherland	Ford 5.0 L V8	**G**	37
21 DNF	GT1	4	(United States) Panoz Motorsports	(United Kingdom) Andy Wallace (Australia) David Brabham	Panoz GTR-1	**MI**	36
21 DNF	GT1	4	(United States) Panoz Motorsports	(United Kingdom) Andy Wallace (Australia) David Brabham	Ford (Roush) 6.0 L V8	**MI**	36
DNS	GT3	24	(United States) Tim Vargo	(United States) Jake Vargo (United States) Tim Vargo (United States) Josh Vargo (United States) Brady Refenning	Porsche 911 Carrera RSR	**P**	0
DNS	GT3	24	(United States) Tim Vargo	(United States) Jake Vargo (United States) Tim Vargo (United States) Josh Vargo (United States) Brady Refenning	Porsche 3.8 L Flat-6	**P**	0
DNS	WSC	11	(United States) Genesis Racing	(United Kingdom) Michael DeFontes (United States) Mark Neuhaus (United States) Jeff Glenn	Kudzu DG-2	**G**	0
DNS	WSC	11	(United States) Genesis Racing	(United Kingdom) Michael DeFontes (United States) Mark Neuhaus (United States) Jeff Glenn	Buick 3.0 L V6	**G**	0
DNS	GT3	23	(United States) Alex Job Racing	(United States) Cort Wagner (United States) Darryl Havens (United States) Kelly Collins	Porsche 964 Carrera RSR	**P**	0
DNS	GT3	23	(United States) Alex Job Racing	(United States) Cort Wagner (United States) Darryl Havens (United States) Kelly Collins	Porsche 3.8 L Flat-6	**P**	0
DNS	GT3	48	(United States) John Finger	(United States) John Finger (United States) Mike Green	Porsche 911 Carrera RSR	?	0
DNS	GT3	48	(United States) John Finger	(United States) John Finger (United States) Mike Green	Porsche 3.8 L Flat-6	?	0

=== Statistics ===
- Pole Position - #7 Doyle-Risi Racing - 1:14.658
- Fastest lap - #27 Doran Enterprises, Inc. - 1:15.51
- Average Speed - 176.89 km/h (109.92 mph)
