= Ralt RT5 =

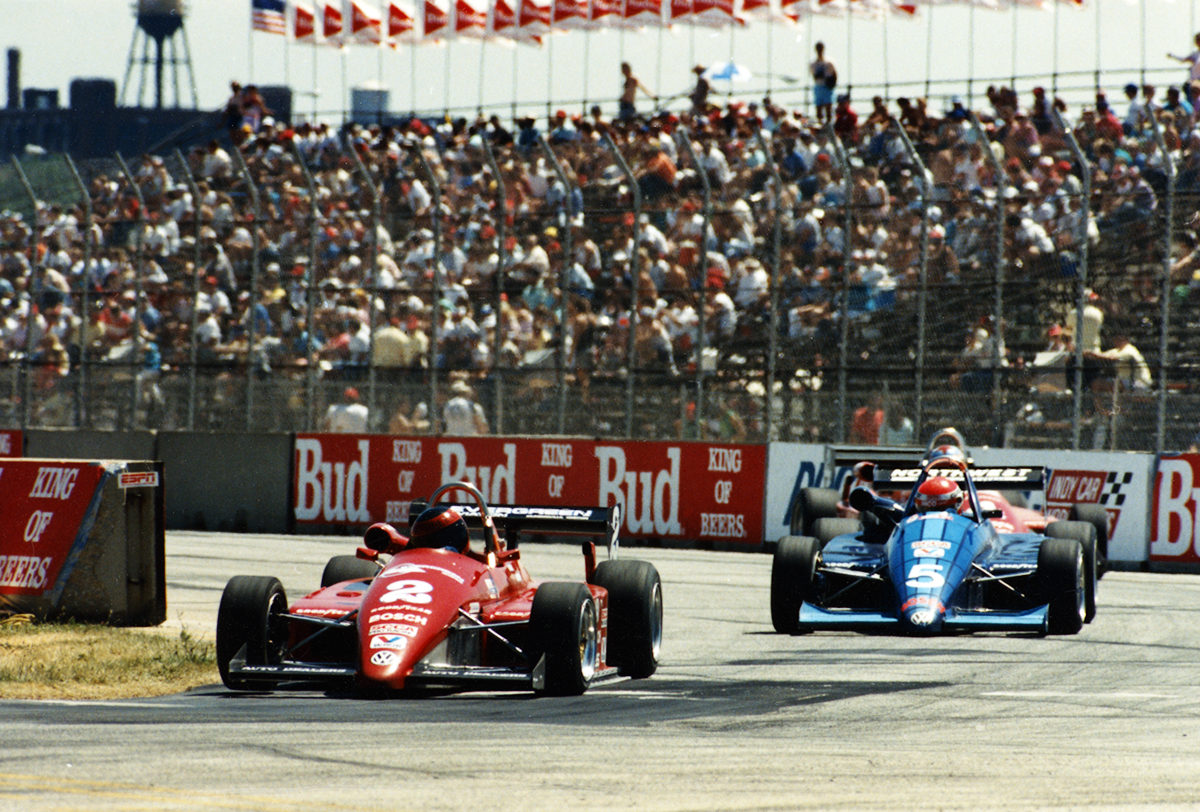
- Category: Formula Super Vee
- Constructor: Ralt
- Designer(s): Ron Tauranac

Technical specifications
- Chassis: Aluminum monocoque, fiberglass body
- Wheelbase: 99.5 in (2,527 mm)
- Engine: Mid-engine, longitudinally mounted, Volkswagen, 1.6–1.8 L (97.6–109.8 cu in), I4, NA
- Transmission: Hewland MK9 5-speed manual
- Power: ~ 180–235 hp (134–175 kW)
- Weight: 1,000–1,075 lb (454–488 kg)
- Tyres: Firestone; Avon

Competition history
- Debut: 1980

The Ralt RT5 is an open-wheel formula race car, developed and built by Ralt in 1982, for the Formula Super Vee racing series, in 1980.
