= Toyota 7 =

Toyota race car

Toyota 7 (415S); Toyota New 7 (474S); Toyota Turbocharged 7 (578A)
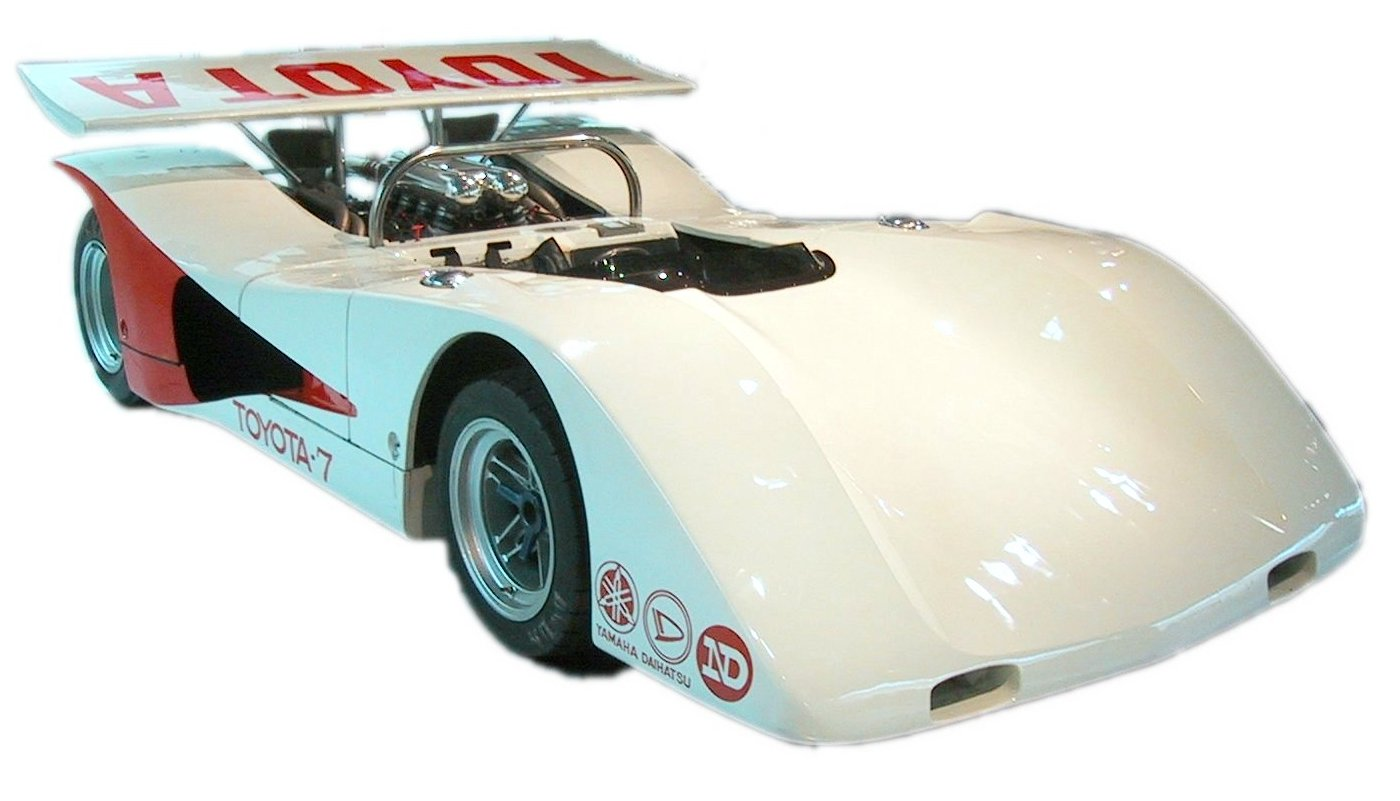
- 1970 Toyota Turbocharged 7 (578A)
- Category: Group 7
- Constructor: Toyota and Yamaha
- Designer: Jiro Kawano

Technical specifications
- Chassis: Fibreglass body on aluminium monocoque (415S); Steel pipe space frame (474S); Aluminium pipe space frame (578A)
- Suspension (front): Double wishbone, coil springs over dampers, anti-roll bar.
- Suspension (rear): lower wishbones, upper links, trailing arms, coil springs over dampers, anti-roll bar.
- Wheelbase: 2,330 mm (415S); 2,300 mm (474S); 2,350 mm (578A)
- Engine: 2986 cc 61E DOHC V8; 4986 cc 79E DOHC V8; 4986 cc 91E DOHC Twin-turbo V8; 90° V8, double overhead cam, 2 valves (61E)/4 valves (79E/91E) per cylinder naturally aspirated (61E/79E) or twin-turbo (91E) Mid-engined, longitudinally mounted
- Transmission: ZF (414S); Hewland (474S); Aisin (578A); 5-speed manual
- Weight: 800 kg (415S); 720 kg (474S); 620 kg (578A)
- Tyres: Firestone Indy; Goodyear; Dunlop

Competition history
- Notable entrants: Toyota
- Notable drivers: (Japan) Minoru Kawai; (Japan) Hiroshi Fushida; (Japan) Shihomi Hosoya; (Japan) Harukuni Takahashi; (United Kingdom) Vic Elford; (Japan) Hiroyuki Kukidome; (Japan) Sachio Fukuzawa; (Japan) Kiyoshi Misaki; (Japan) Yoshio Otsubo; (Japan) Mitsumasa Kanie
- Debut: 1968 Japanese Grand Prix
Wins
9

The Toyota 7 was a series of racing cars developed by Toyota Motor Company in cooperation with Yamaha Motor Corporation. Designed primarily for use in FIA Group 7 competition, it was Toyota's first purpose-built racing car project.

== Design ==
=== 7 (415S) ===
The first iteration of the Toyota 7, known by the internal code 415S, began development in the second quarter of 1967. Jiro Kawano, the head of Toyota's motorsports activities and the lead engineer of the 2000GT, once again collaborated with Yamaha to develop and construct the Toyota 7. Yamaha constructed the 415S' aluminium monocoque chassis. The initial bodywork was similar to other Group 7 cars, with an open two-seater cockpit and large intakes behind the doors. Exhaust pipes were placed directly on top of the engine, exiting straight off the tail of the car - mimicking the exhaust layout of the Ford Indy V8. A simple rollhoop protected the driver. Toyota designed a new aluminium-block V8 engine, the 3-litre 61E. This engine was capable of producing up to 224 kW (300 hp; 304 PS), thanks to the addition of a dual overhead cam design and four valves per cylinder. Thanks to an amendment in the FIA sporting regulations for 1968, Toyota's 3-litre engine would also be eligible to compete in the FIA International Championship for Makes under the Group 6 Sports Prototype regulations.

The first 415S chassis was completed in January, and made its testing debut on 3 February 1968 at Suzuka Circuit. Testing then moved to Fuji Speedway on 4 March. While the 61E powerplant was being completed, the 415S tested with the two-litre, six-cylinder 3M engine from the 2000GT. On 28 March, the 61E engine was installed in the 415S for the first time. During testing, it was discovered that rivets holding the 415S' monocoque structure together would start to loosen under lateral load, compromising the car's rigidity. More reinforcement structures were added in response, resulting in the car being much heavier than its initial 680 kg figure. Testing continued through April, as Team Toyota carried out race simulations, and Yamaha purchased a Ford GT40 as a reference vehicle.

==== 1968 Japan Grand Prix ====
Four 415S made their debut at the 1968 Japan Grand Prix Car Race at Fuji Speedway, for drivers Shihomi Hosoya (red, number 1), Sachio Fukuzawa (green, number 2), Hiroshi Fushida (white, number 3), and Yoshio Otsubo (cream, number 5). The 61E engine in the 415S proved to be much less powerful than the Chevrolet small block V8 engines powering their main rivals, the new Nissan R381, and the Lola T70s fielded by Taki Racing Organisation. The added weight from testing also meant that the car was much heavier than the two-litre sports prototypes, including Taki Racing's Porsche 910 and 906, and the Nissan R380-IIIs. Fukuzawa was the fastest Toyota in time trials, qualifying sixth with a lap of 1:56.21. His time, however, was two seconds slower than the 415S' fastest time from preseason testing, and over five seconds slower than the fastest time set by Kunimitsu Takahashi in his R381.

In the race, Fushida was running sixth when he suffered a puncture, while Otsubo was suffering from a lack of oil pressure. After half-distance, Fukuzawa was running in second place, and Hosoya, who started tenth, was running fourth. However, Hosoya retired on Lap 44 from an overheating issue, and Fukuzawa suffered suspension and driveshaft failures on Lap 59, completing enough laps to be classified fourteenth. Fushida and Otsubo recovered from their early troubles to finish the race. Otsubo finished eighth, five laps down, and Fushida finished ninth, six laps down. Although the 7s finished, they were well behind their main competitor, Nissan, who had not only two new R381s, but also three older R380-IIIs finish ahead of them in the top six, led by the R381 of race winner Moto Kitano. Taki Racing's two-litre Porsches, led by runner-up Tetsu Ikuzawa in second, also finished ahead of Otsubo and Fushida.

The 415S continued racing in endurance races and other domestic events. Hosoya scored the 415S' first competition victory on 30 June at the All-Japan Suzuka Auto Racing Tournament, leading a sweep of the top four positions with Otsubo second, Mitsumasa Kanie third, and Fushida fourth. Fushida and Kanie won the second annual Fuji 1000km on 21 July, and two weeks later on 4 August, Hosoya and Otsubo won the Suzuka 12 Hour Race, in a 1-2 finish ahead of Fushida & Kanie. Fushida then won the second All-Japan Suzuka Auto Racing Tournament on 25 August. On 23 September, Fukuzawa and Fushida took a dominant victory in the third annual 1000km Suzuka.

==== 1968 World Challenge Cup Fuji 200 Mile Race ====
An invitational 200-mile (320 km) race was held at Fuji on 23 November, the inaugural World Challenge Cup Fuji 200 Mile Race, which became known colloquially as the "Japan Can-Am" race. Toyota entered five 415S, with newcomer Minoru Kawai (number 35) joining Japan Grand Prix drivers Fushida (#31), Fukuzawa (#32), Otsubo (#33), and Hosoya (#34). The field featured several top drivers from the Can Am series in America, as well as two Lola T70s entered by Taki Racing.

While Peter Revson's Shelby American McLaren M6B-Ford took the win after battling Mark Donohue's Sunoco Special McLaren-Chevrolet, Fukuzawa finished fourth as the highest-ranked Japanese driver, earning ¥1,152,000 from the prize purse. Otsubo finished fifth, Hosoya sixth, Fushida eighth, and Kawai ninth, as all five Toyotas made it to the end of the race around Fuji's shorter 4.3 km course (run counter-clockwise).

As development of the new Toyota 7 continued into 1969, Fushida won the Suzuka 300 km on 19 January of that year. The 415S' last competitive victory came at the All-Japan Clubman Race at Fuji on 20 April 1969.

All fourteen of the original Toyota 415S chassis were destroyed after the car was retired from racing. In 2007, Nautilus Sports Cars, a garage based in Sakura, Chiba Prefecture, produced a full-scale replica of the 415S. The project was overseen by Hosoya, and the replica vehicle was displayed at the Toyota Automotive Museum in Nagakute, Aichi Prefecture. In 2017, the replica 415S was displayed at the Auto Galleria Luce in Nagoya, as part of an exhibit to honour Fushida's racing career.

=== New 7 (474S) ===
Development on the new Toyota 7 began in May 1968 immediately following the Japan Grand Prix.The new Toyota 7 was referred to internally as the 474S, while press material referred to it as the New 7. The first 474S chassis was completed in March 1968, and began testing with a 5.8 litre Chevrolet small block V8 engine installed.

The aluminium monocoque chassis was discarded in favour of a steel pipe space frame chassis, similar to the Nissan R381. The bodywork was completely redesigned, initially as a closed-cockpit body. But due to problems with visibility and weight, Toyota discarded the closed-cockpit 474S in favour of a new open-cockpit body, shaped similar to a large broad wedge for increased front downforce. At the rear of the car, the exhaust pipes were placed within the bodywork, while an intake scoop was mounted over the rollbar. Daihatsu Motor Corporation were now involved with the project, having lent their wind tunnel to Toyota and Yamaha to develop the redesigned open-cockpit body.

Toyota's new five-litre V8 engine, the 79E, was completed and installed on 23 April. The 79E's design was derived from the Ford Cosworth DFV, and was capable of producing 395 kW (530 hp; 537 PS) at 7,600 rpm, and 519.75 Nm of torque at 5,600 rpm. This now meant that they had a powerplant that could match the Nissan GRX-I V12 engine, which was still in development.

The closed-cockpit 474S took its first victory in the 1969 Suzuka 500 km on 6 April, as Minoru Kawai took his first victory with Team Toyota. Two months after the open-cockpit body was completed, the revised 474S made its debut at the Fuji 1000 km, where the team of Fushida and Otsubo claimed Toyota's third consecutive victory in the event. On 10 August, Fushida won the NET Speed Cup Race at Fuji.

==== 1969 Japan Grand Prix ====
The New Toyota 7's main event for the year was the 1969 Japanese Grand Prix, held on 10 October. Toyota entered five 474S for the event, and because the race distance was extended to 720 km, teams could now register two drivers to a car. Kawai drove alone in the number 3 Toyota with the light blue stripe. Former Daihatsu works driver Hiroyuki Kukidome joined Hosoya in car #2 (red), Fushida was partnered by newcomer Harukuni Takahashi in car #5 (dark blue), Kanie was partnered by Kiyoshi Misaki in the #6 (yellow), and Vic Elford was recruited to drive the #7 (green) entry, joined by Toshiaki Takahashi. Nissan arrived with their revised R382s, which now had the new six-litre GRX-III V12 engine, and Taki Racing Organisation partnered with Porsche to field the new 917 and 908.

Kawai, who qualified fifth for the race, led the first two laps of the race, and eventually finished in third, just one lap behind the R382s of race winner Motoharu Kurosawa and runner-up Moto Kitano. Elford finished fourth, while the Kukidome/Hosoya car finished fifth. Meanwhile, tyre problems left the Kanie/Misaki car in 13th (26 laps down), and Fushida spun off and retired after a suspension failure on Lap 5. Although Toyota was able to outperform the new Porsche 917 from Taki Racing, the Nissans once again proved too daunting, thanks to their late introduction of the GRX-III engine.

==== 1969 World Challenge Cup Fuji 200 Mile Race ====
The Toyota 7 had taken many endurance racing victories and had won many domestic sprint races, but hadn't won the Japan Grand Prix or the "Japan Can-Am", regarded as the two biggest races on the calendar at the time. That changed on 23 November 1969, at the second running of the World Challenge Cup Fuji 200 Mile invitational race. For this race, the 474S was modified with the addition of a rear spoiler, which had been banned from use in the Japan Grand Prix.

Minoru Kawai, driving the white and blue number 8 Toyota 474S, won the race ahead of John Cannon's Ford G7A, a milestone for the Toyota 7 project. Two other Toyota 474S were entered, however, Kukidome (#6) retired after 46 laps, and Hosoya (#7) retired after 35 laps. In addition, a modified McLaren M12 with the Toyota 79E engine was entered as a research and development car for Fushida, who retired after 21 laps.

Twelve 474S chassis were constructed, and the only survivor is Kawai's Japan Can-Am winning car, which was restored in 2007.

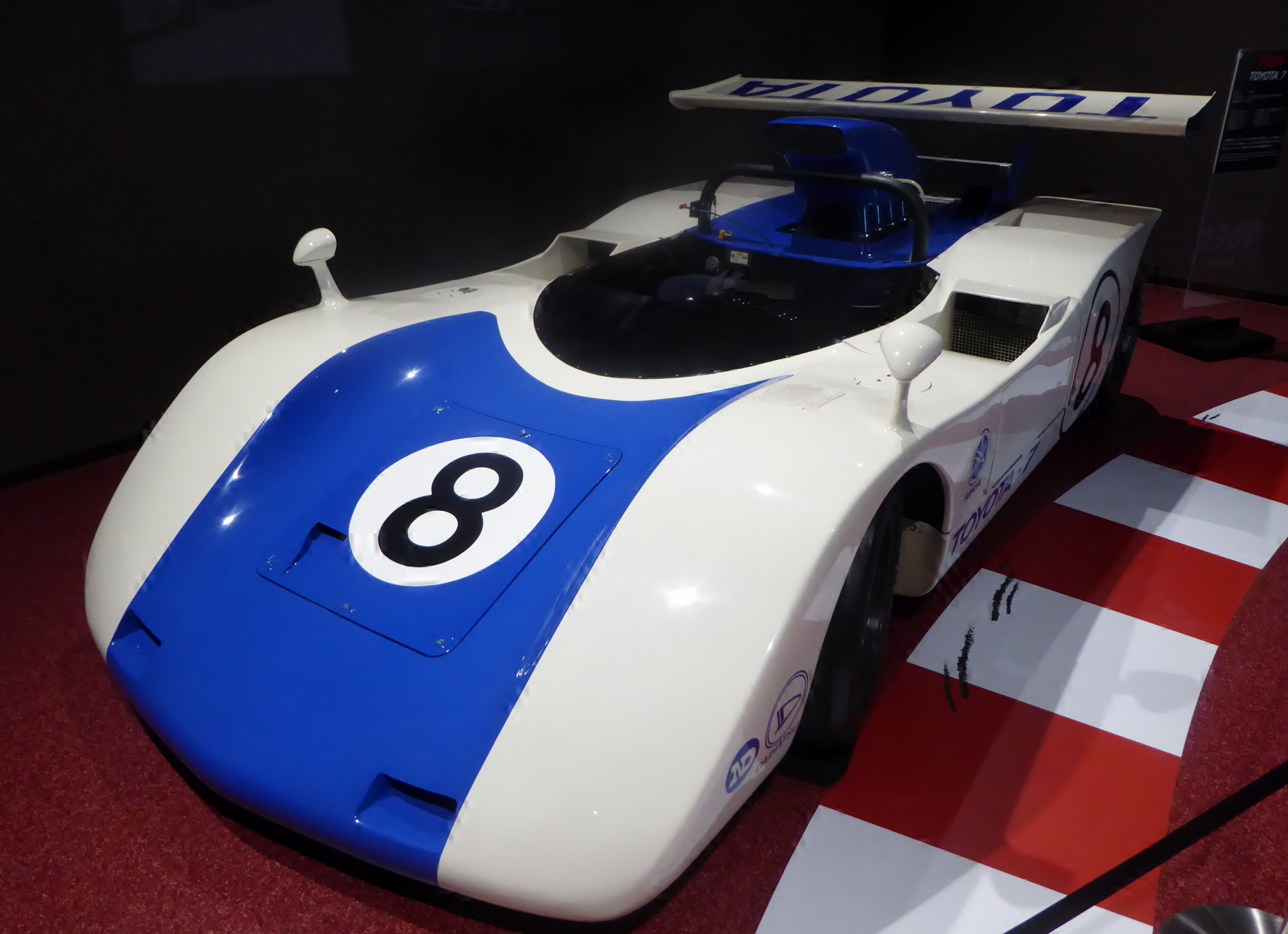
Front view of the 1969 Toyota New 7

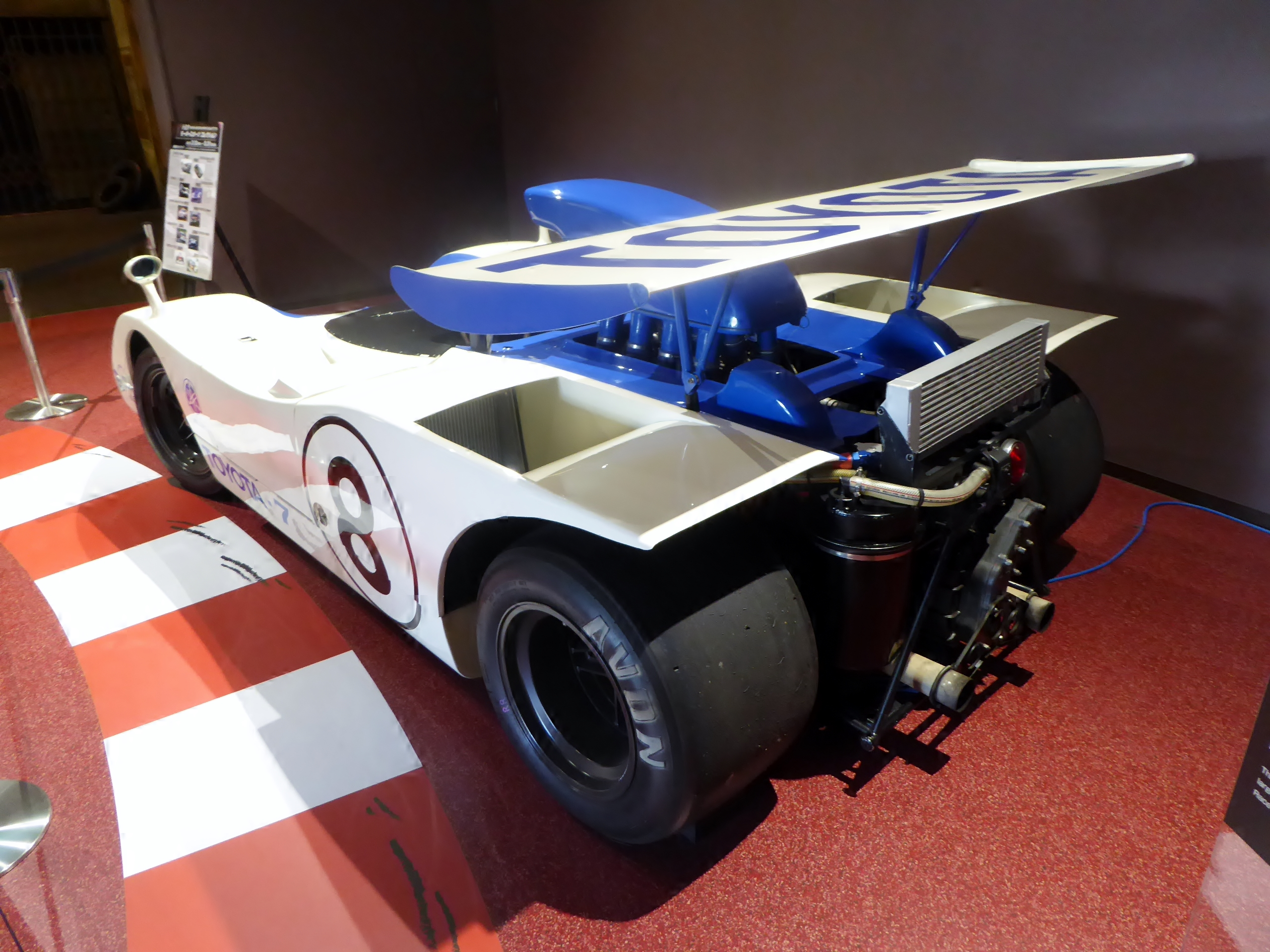
Rear view of the 1969 Toyota New 7

=== Turbocharged 7 (578A) ===
The next evolution of the Toyota 7 was the turbocharged 578A. Development began in November 1969, and the first chassis was completed in April 1970. Like the 474S, the 578A was constructed with a space frame chassis - however, the frame was made using aluminium alloy instead of steel, and titanium and magnesium alloy was used for the gearbox casing, suspension arm, and driveshaft for increased rigidity and further weight saving. These weight-saving technique brought the car's minimum weight to 620 kg. The engine was bolted to the rear of the bulkhead, just behind the cockpit. Improved suspension geometry resulted in improved handling and stability.

Powering the Toyota 7 Turbo was the new 91E engine. It was a 5-litre V8 engine like the previous 79E, but the addition of two Garrett AiResearch turbochargers brought the 91E to a conservatively-estimated 597 kW (800 hp; 811 PS) @ 8,000 rpm, with peak torque of 725 Nm @ 7,600 rpm.

The Toyota 7 Turbo was set to compete in the 1970 Japanese Grand Prix at Fuji Speedway, against Nissan's prospective challenger, the R383. But on 8 June, Nissan announced that they would be withdrawing from the Japanese Grand Prix, citing their desire to concentrate on developing more efficient road vehicles in the wake of the 1968 Air Pollution Control Law. Shortly thereafter, Toyota also announced they would withdraw from the Japanese Grand Prix, and the Japan Automobile Federation (JAF) cancelled the 1970 running of the race. Toyota planned to move the cars to North America and enter the Can-Am Series. Three Toyota 7 Turbos performed an exhibition run during the 1970 Fuji 1000 km, driven by Hosoya, Kawai, and Kukidome.

An example of the Toyota 7 Turbo is exhibited at the Toyota Automotive Museum in Nagakute, Aichi. The car makes occasional appearances at automotive festivals such as the Toyota Gazoo Racing Festival and Goodwood Festival of Speed.

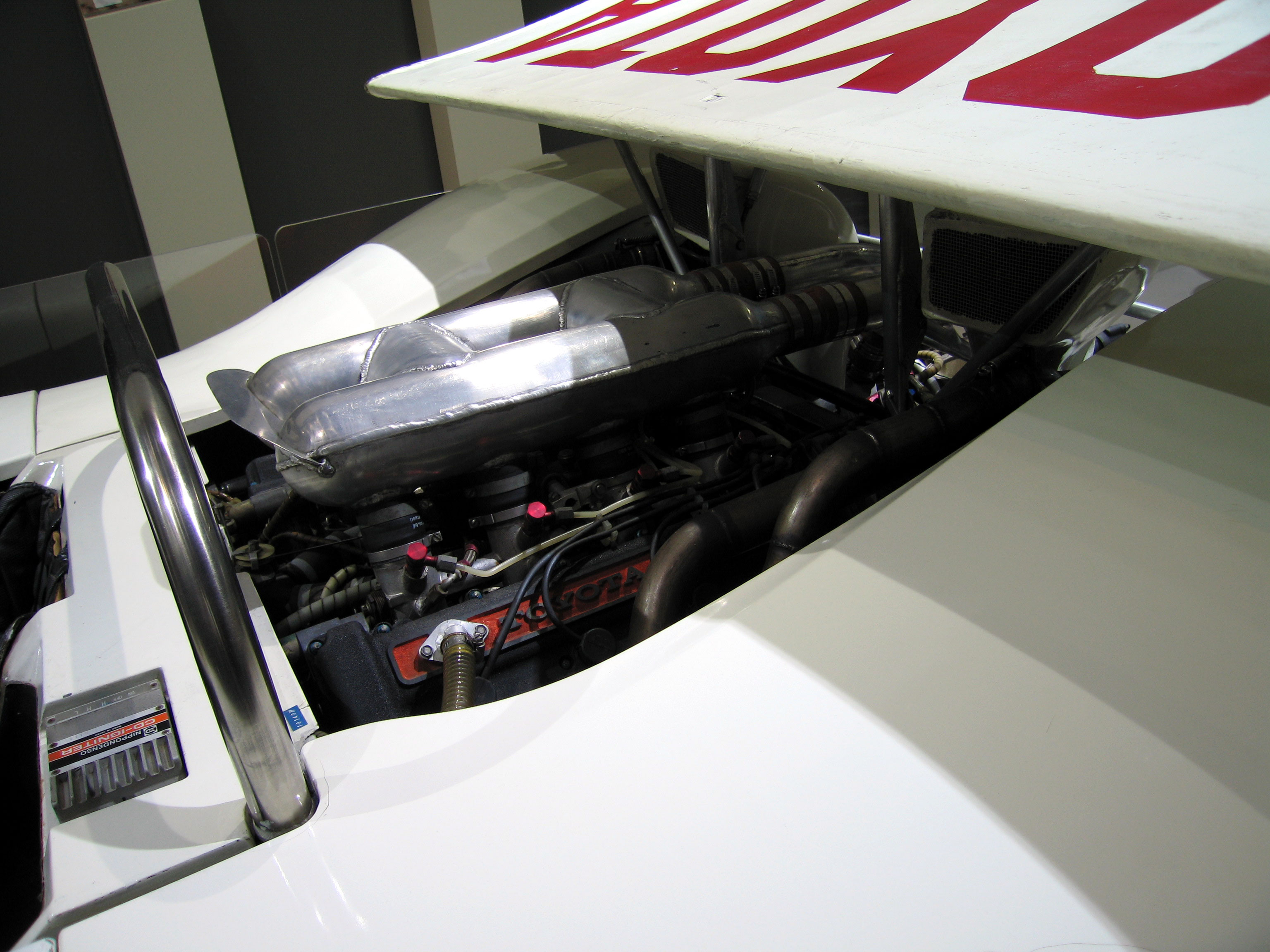
The turbocharged Toyota 7's air box and engine.

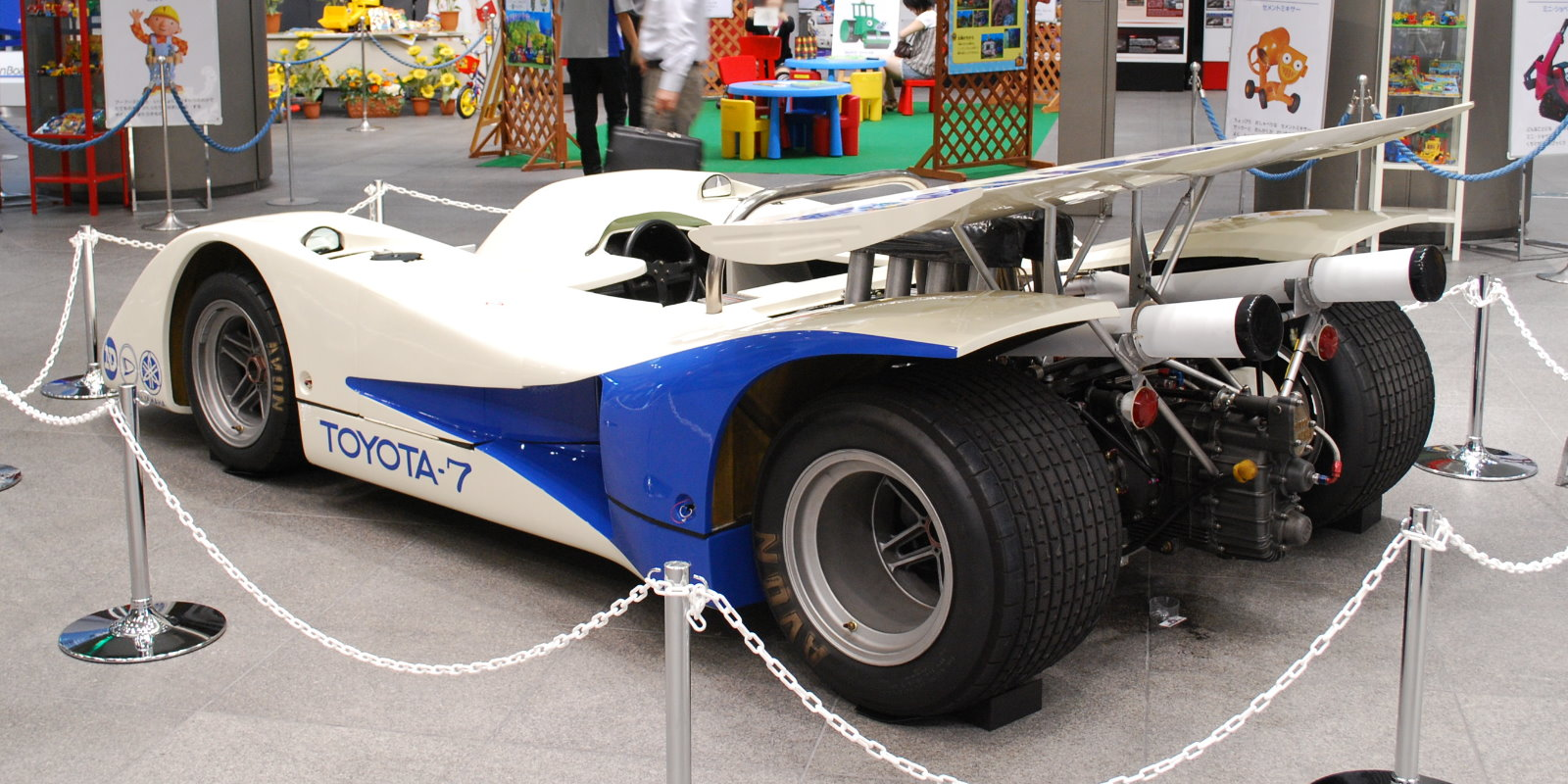
Rear view of the 1970 Toyota 7 in naturally aspirated form

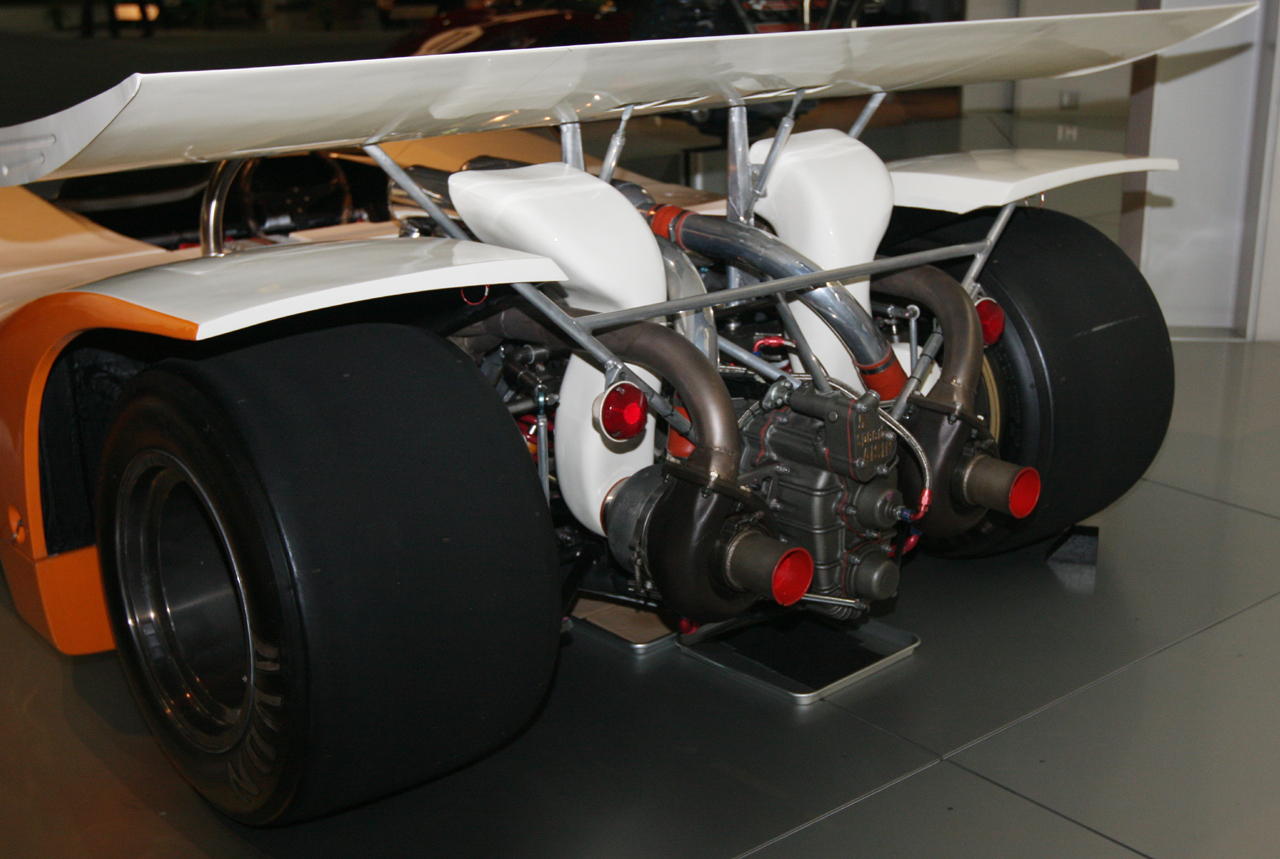
Rear view of the 1970 Toyota 7 in twin-turbocharged form

Toyota used the 7 once more in 1970 as a base for the EX-7, publicly shown at that year's Tokyo Motor Show. The turbochargers were removed from the V8 engine to bring the power down to 450 PS (330 kW) while the bodywork was a streamlined coupé design similar to other supercars of the era.

== Accidents ==
The Toyota 7 project was tarnished by two fatal testing accidents, which ultimately led to Team Toyota abandoning plans to enter the 24 Hours of Le Mans and the Canadian-American Challenge Cup, ultimately resulting in the end of the project in 1970.

On 29 March 1968, Toyota survived a near catastrophe during testing for the upcoming Japan Grand Prix, when Yoshio Otsubo crashed through the guardrail at the 30° banked corner at Fuji, while driving the 3-litre 415S. Otsubo miraculously survived without any major injuries. He parted ways with Team Toyota at the end of 1969.

=== Death of Sachio Fukuzawa ===
Sachio Fukuzawa (18 June 1943 - 12 February 1969) was one of Team Toyota's original factory drivers, starting from the team's inception in 1966. As a racing driver, fashion executive, designer, and model, Fukuzawa was one of Toyota's most successful and prolific drivers.

On 12 February 1969, Fukuzawa was taking part in a private test session at Yamaha's new test course in Fukuroi, Japan, driving an undisclosed closed-cockpit prototype with the 3-litre 61E engine installed. At 11:45 AM local time, Fukuzawa's car lost control at the end of a straightaway, swerved off to the right, and crashed into a metal signpost. The car then skidded off an embankment, rolled over, and caught fire. Hosoya, who was also taking part at the test, arrived at the crash site and attempted to free Fukuzawa from the burning vehicle. However, Fukuzawa died instantly of head injuries sustained upon impact with the iron signpost.

Toyota did not provide photographs of the accident vehicle to local authorities, citing confidential trade secrets. In fact, the accident vehicle's remains were disposed of after the accident, and photographs of a different car were given to local police for the investigation. Toyota then stated that the accident was caused by driver error. Subsequently, Shintaro Fukuzawa, Sachio's father, took legal action against Toyota, charging them with negligence and obstructing the investigation into Fukuzawa's accident, while claiming that a design flaw on the accident vehicle was the cause of the accident. After a twelve-year legal battle, the Fukuzawa family were awarded ¥61,000,000 in damages in a 1981 settlement.

The cause of the accident was never revealed, and the accident vehicle was never identified.

=== Death of Minoru Kawai ===
Minoru Kawai (9 December 1942 - 26 August 1970) joined Team Toyota for the 1968 World Challenge Fuji 200 Mile Race, and became a full-time factory driver for 1969. Following Fukuzawa's accident, Kawai was given a more prominent role within Toyota as a leading driver and spokesman for the company, and his stature within the team grew following his win in the 1969 Fuji 200 Mile Race.

Kawai was testing the Toyota 7 Turbo at Suzuka Circuit on 26 August 1970, the day that Toyota formally approved plans to enter the Canadian-American Challenge Cup. As Kawai exited the second Degner Curve (modern Turn 9), it is believed now that the car had a stuck throttle and Kawai attempted to stop the car, when he lost control on the underpass, with skid marks on the circuit. With the car out of control, it hit a trackside ditch near the kink before Hairpin (Turn 10), sending the car airborne. Kawai was thrown from his vehicle, where he sustained massive head and leg injuries, and died instantly.

Kawai's death, along with the furore over legal issues with Fukuzawa's death with charges of a coverup, resulted in Toyota withdrawing their plans to enter the Can-Am Series, and with the earlier cancellation of the 1970 Japan Grand Prix, development of the Toyota 7 Turbo was officially ceased in September 1970.

== Media ==
The Toyota 7 Turbo (578A) appears in several installments of the Gran Turismo video game series, beginning with Gran Turismo 4, Gran Turismo (PSP), Gran Turismo 5, and most recently Gran Turismo 6.
