= Yoshikazu Sunako =

Japanese motorcyclist (1932–2020)

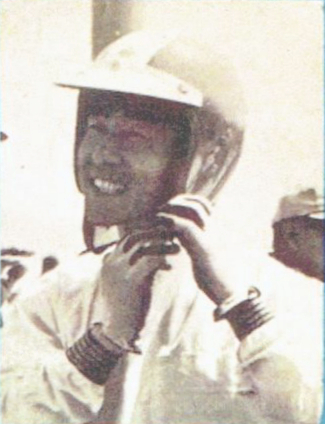
- Nationality: JPN
- Born: 23 September 1932 Kaohsiung, Japanese Taiwan
- Died: 3 January 2020 (aged 87) Japan
- Relatives: Tomohiko Sunako (son)
Motorcycle racing career statistics
250cc World Championship
Active years	1961, 1963
Manufacturers	Yamaha
1963 championship position	7th
Starts / Wins / Podiums / Poles / F. laps / Points; 3 / 0 / 1 / 0 / 0 / 10

Yoshikazu Sunako (砂子義一, Sunako Yoshikazu; born 23 September 1932 - died 3 January 2020) was a Japanese motorcycle racer and racing driver.

Sunako was a works rider for Yamaha during the late 1950s and early 1960s. After racing in Japanese events, Sunako made his Grand Prix motorcycle racing debut in the 1961 Belgian Grand Prix, where he finished sixth in the 250cc category. He made two starts in the 1963 Grand Prix motorcycle racing season, scoring his only podium at the Belgian Grand Prix. He finished the year seventh in the championship standings.

After the 1963 season, Sunako made the switch to four-wheel racing and signed with the Prince Motor Company as a works driver. He made his debut in the 1964 Japanese Grand Prix at Suzuka Circuit. He drove his Prince Skyline S54 to a second-place finish in the GT-II sports car race, behind the Porsche 904 of Sokichi Shikiba. This race is cited as the "Beginning of the Skyline Legend" in motor racing.

In 1966, Sunako won the Japanese Grand Prix sports car race at Fuji Speedway in his Prince R380. After Nissan's acquisition of Prince was completed later in the year, Sunako continued as a works driver for Nissan. He finished the year as the champion of the All-Japan Racing Driver Championship in the touring car division.

Sunako was the co-driver to Motoharu Kurosawa when he won the 1969 Japanese Grand Prix in a Nissan R382. Sunako did not drive during the 120 lap race, but is officially credited as a winning driver alongside Kurosawa.

Sunako retired from racing in 1971, and continued to serve as an ambassador for Nissan until he died on 3 January 2020.

Sunako's son, Tomohiko, is also a racing driver.

== Racing Record ==
=== Motorcycle Grand Prix results ===
(key) (Races in bold indicate pole position)

Year	Class	Team	1	2	3	4	5	6	7	8	9	10	11	12	Points	Rank	Wins
1961	250 cc	Yamaha	ESP	GER	FRA	IOM	NED	BEL; 6	DDR	ULS	NAT	SWE	ARG		1	17th	0
1963	250 cc	Yamaha	ESP	GER		IOM	NED; 4	BEL; 2	ULS	DDR		NAT	ARG	JPN	9	7th	0
