= Shinichiro Sakurai =

Japanese automotive engineer

- 桜井 眞一郎
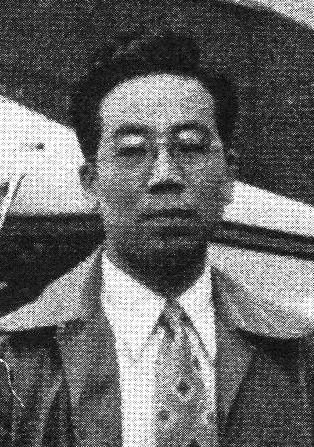
- Sakurai in 1953
- Born: 3 April 1929; Yokohama, Kanagawa Prefecture
- Died: 17 January 2011 (aged 81); Setagaya, Tokyo
- Education: Yokohama National University
- Engineering career
- Projects: Nissan Skyline
- Awards: Japan Automotive Hall of Fame (2005)

Shinichiro Sakurai (桜井 眞一郎, Sakurai Shin'ichirō; 1929–2011) was a Japanese engineer for Prince Motor Company and later Nissan. He continued to work in the automotive field up until his death.

He is best known for the development of several generations of the Nissan Skyline, earning him the nickname "Father of the Skyline".

== History ==
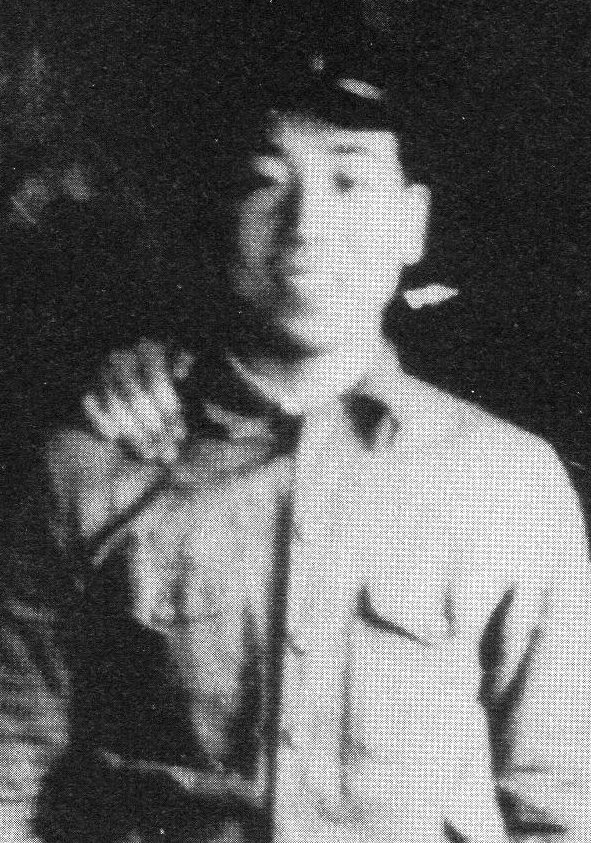
Sakurai at Yokohama National University at the age of 19

Sakurai was born in Totsuka-ku, Yokohama on April 3, 1929. After graduating from Yokohama National University's Department of Mechanical Engineering in March of 1951 with the aim of working in the automotive industry, Sakurai worked for the Shimizu Corporation before he was given the opportunity to work for Tama Motor Company.

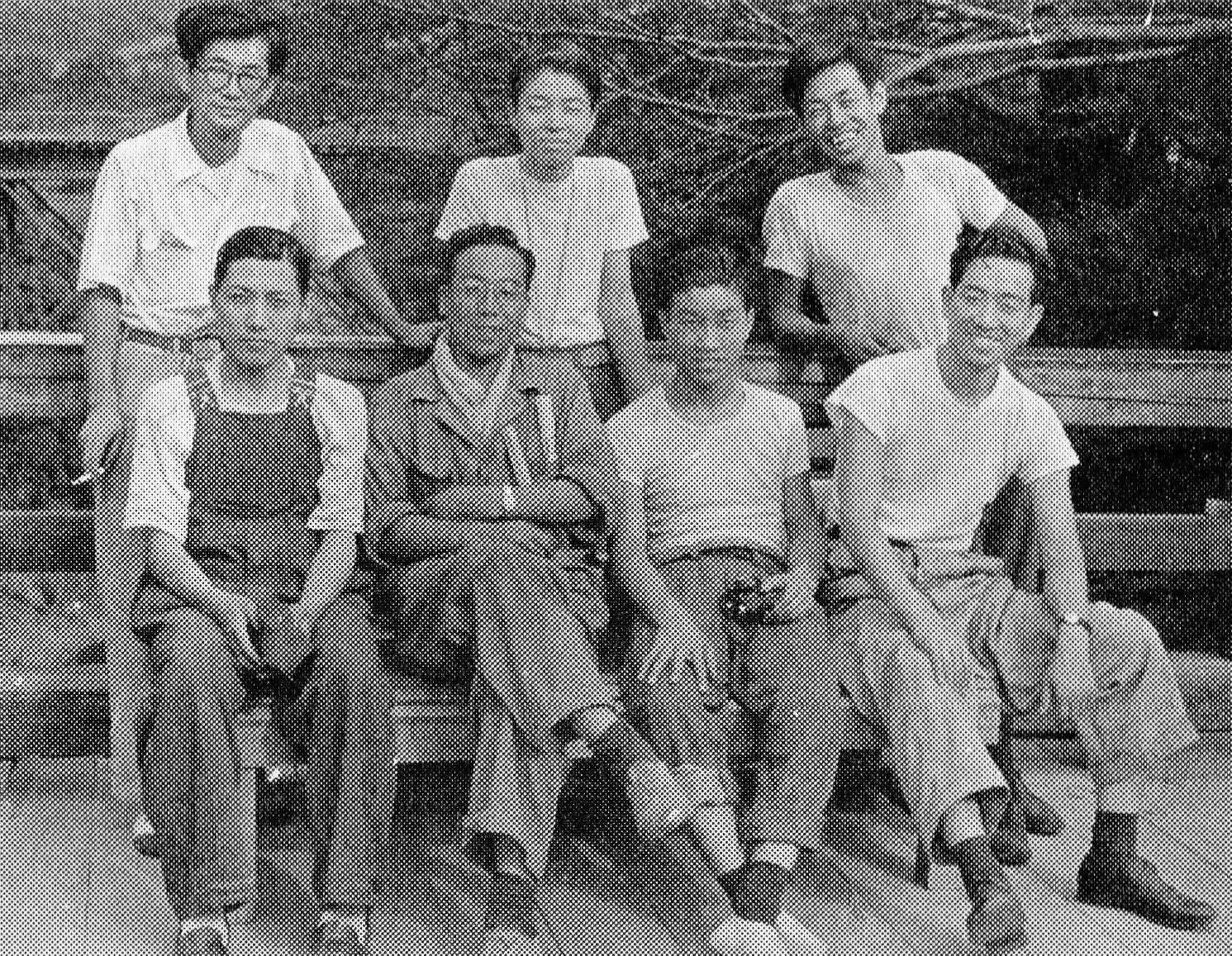
Sakurai (second from left, sitting) and his boss Takuya Himura (leftmost, standing) at the Prince Motor Company Mitaka Plant, circa 1954.

He joined Tama (later Prince) as a chassis engineer under Jiro Tanaka in October of 1952 (later working under Ryoichi Nakagawa in 1954), and was heavily involved in the development of the first-generation Prince Skyline. In September of 1963, not long after Prince's merger with Nissan that August, Sakurai was promoted to manager of a design department within Nissan's Prince division.

Sakurai also headed the Nissan MID4 sports car project. He was appointed President of Nissan subsudiary Autech in 1986 and President of S&S Engineering (later S&S Holdings) in 1994. He served as a part-time lecturer at Osaka Sangyo University in 1989 and Tokai University in 1995. He was inducted into the Japan Automotive Hall of Fame in May of 2005.

Sakurai died of heart failure in Setagaya, Tokyo on January 17, 2011.

== See also ==
- Prince R380
- Nissan R381
- Nissan R382
- Nissan R383
- Nissan Laurel (C31)
- Nissan Leopard (F30)
- Nissan MID4
- Autech Zagato Stelvio
