= 1969 Chevron Surfers Paradise 6 Hour =

Coordinates: 28°0′59″S 153°22′34″E

The 1969 Chevron Surfers Paradise 6 Hour was an endurance race for Sports Cars and Touring Cars. The event was held at the Surfers Paradise circuit in Queensland, Australia on 2 November 1969.

The race was won by Kunimitsu Takahashi and Yoshikayo Sunago, driving a Nissan R380A-III.

== Classes ==
Entries were divided into the following classes:

- Sports Cars (Over 2000cc)
- Sports Cars (Under 2000cc)
- Improved Production Sports Cars (Under 2000cc)
- Improved Production Touring Cars (Over 2000cc)
- Improved Production Touring Cars (Under 2000cc)
- Series Production Sports Cars (Over 2000cc)
- Series Production Sports Cars (Under 2000cc)

== Results ==
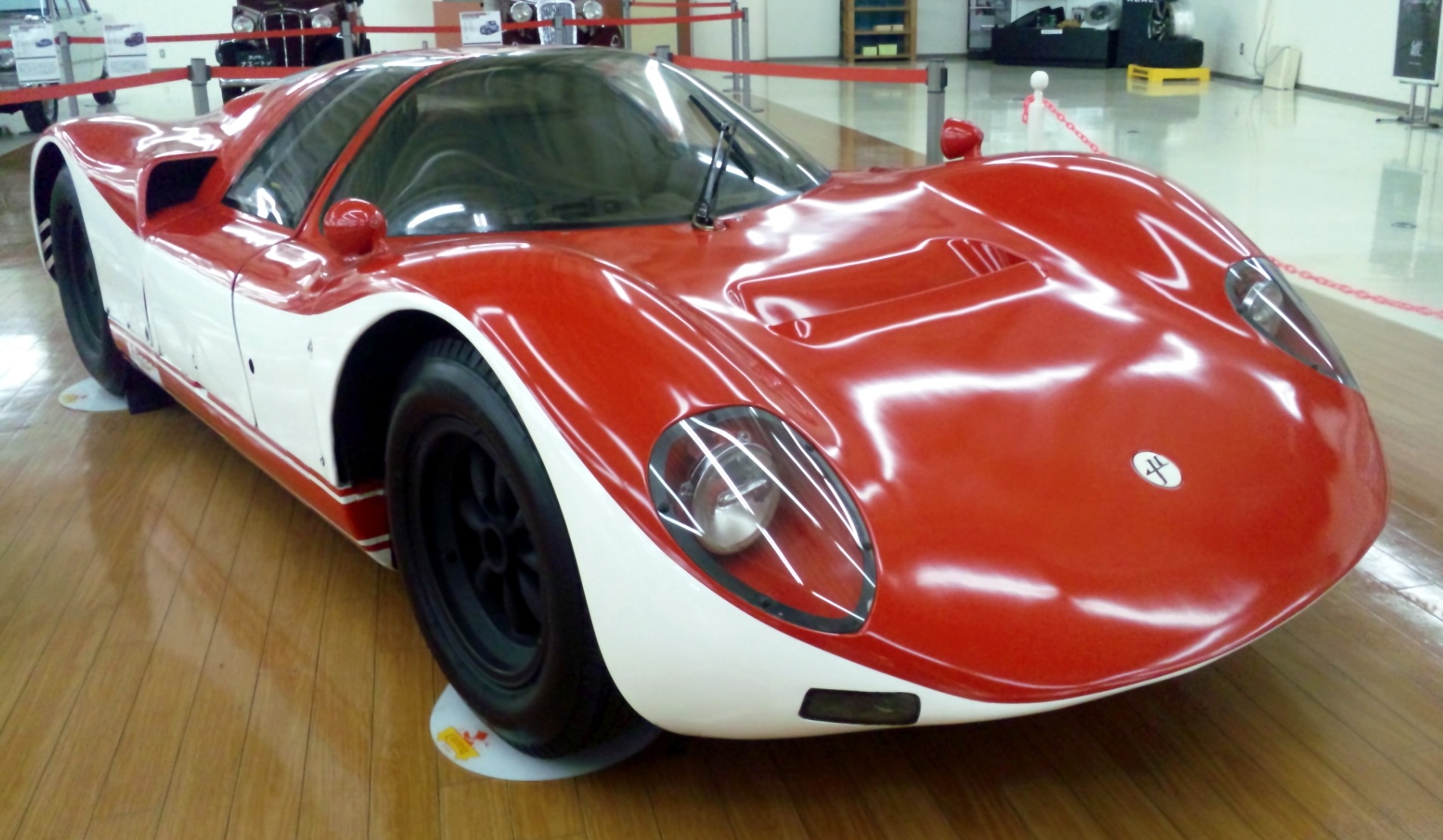
A Nissan R380, similar to the winning car (Image from 2011)

Position	Drivers	No.	Car	Entrant	Class	Class Pos.	Laps
1	Kunimitsu Takahashi, Yoshikayo Sunago	6	Nissan R380A-III	Nissan Motor Co. Ltd.	SC -2000	1	257
2	Moto Kitano, Motoharu Kurosawa	5	Nissan R380A-III	Nissan Motor Co. Ltd.	SC -2000	2	253
3	Glynn Scott, Joe Camilleri, Ann Thompson	13	Lotus Elan	Glyn Scott Motors	IPSC -2000	1	236
4	Bob Beasley, Brian Davies	7	Lotus 47	Wright Ford Motors, Sydney	SC -2000	3	233
5	Doug Whiteford, John Roxburgh, Barry Tapsall	12	Datsun 2000	Datsun Racing Team	IPSC -2000	2	231
6	Keith Williams, David McKay, Alan Hamilton	28	Porsche 911S	Keith Williams	SPSP -2000	1	228
7	John Goss, Dennis Cribbin	3	Tornado Ford	Carl Robertson Ford Pty. Ltd.	SC +2000	1	225
8	Bill Fanning, Bob Holden	25	Ford Cortina Lotus	Ian Hindmarsh Motors	IPTC -2000	1	223
9	Harry Heath, Ross Bond	14	Lotus Europa	Geoghegan's Sporty Cars	IPSC -2000	3	217
10	Leo Geoghegan, Jim Bertram	15	Ford Falcon GTHO	McCluskey Ford Pty. Ltd.	IPTC +2000	1	216
11	Max Volkers, Brian Michelmore	16	Holden Monaro GTS327	M. Volkers	IPTC +2000	2	215
12	Ron Kearns, Gerry Lister	23	Volvo 132	British and Continental Cars Pty. Ltd.	IPTC -2000	2	211
13	Ray Gulson, Peter Brown	22	Alfa Romeo 1750 Berlina	Canberra Speed Shop	IPTC -2000	3	207
14	Terry Friar, John Hoade	26	Mazda R100	Terry Friar	IPTC -2000	4	206
15	Patricia Peck, Doug Macarthur	17	Ford Falcon GTHO	D & P Traders Pty. Limited	IPTC +2000	3	205
16	Brian Scoffell, Reg Fairley	29	MGB Mk. II	New Formula Motors	SPSC -2000	2	200
17	Bob Jemison, Doug Booty	20	Datsun 1600	Windmill Star Service Station	IPTC -2000	5	185
DNF	Doug Whiteford, John Roxburgh, Barry Tapsall	19	Datsun 1600	Datsun Racing Team	IPTC -2000		
DNF	Dave Moline, B. Rollinhoff	10	Elfin	Ian Hindmarsh Motors	SC -2000		
DNF	D. Wilkins, A Whitchurch	9	Lolita	Rawlinson's Panel & Paint Racing Team	SC -2000		
DNF	David Seldon, Digby Cooke	23	Volvo 142	British and Continental Cars Pty. Ltd.	IPTC -2000		
DNF	Friedrick Kohout	21	Porsche 911S	Friedrick Kohout	IPTC -2000		
DNF	Howie Sangster, Henk Woelders	2	Lola T70 Mk. II	Don O'Sullivan Racing Pty. Ltd.	SC +2000		11
Disq	Frank Matich, Don O'Sullivan	1	Matich SR3 Repco	Rothmans Team Matich	SC +2000		

Given that there were 29 entries, there may have been more starters than have been accounted for in the above table.

=== Notes ===
- Entries in Official Programme: 29
- Start: Le Mans-style
- Pole Position: Frank Matich, Don O'Sullivan, 1m 13.3s (set by Matich)
- Distance covered by winning car, 257 laps, 514 miles (827 km)
- Fastest lap: Frank Matich, 1m 13s
