= Motoharu Kurosawa =

Japanese racing driver (born 1940)

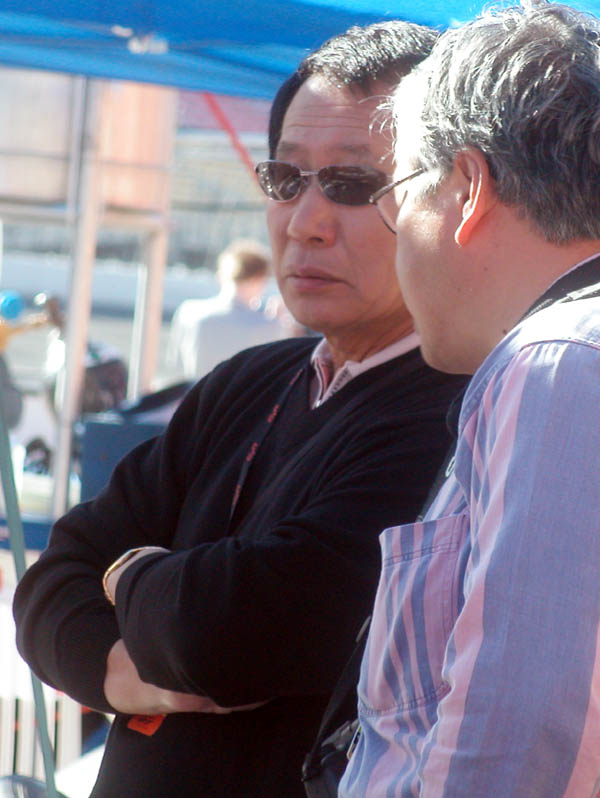
- Nationality: (Japan) Japanese
- Born: August 6, 1940 (age 86) Hitachi, Ibaraki, Japan
- Relatives: Takuya Kurosawa (son); Haruki Kurosawa (son); Tsubasa Kurosawa (son)

Motoharu Kurosawa (黒澤元治, Kurosawa Motoharu; born 6 August 1940), nicknamed "Gan-san", is a Japanese retired professional racing driver. He is the patriarch of a racing family; his three sons, Takuya, Haruki, and Tsubasa, are all racing drivers.

== Racing career ==
After a brief career in domestic motorcycle racing with Honda, Kurosawa signed as a works racing driver for Nissan in 1965. Kurosawa won the 1967 All-Japan Racing Drivers Championship in the Sports Car Division 2. In 1969, Kurosawa won the Japanese Grand Prix sports car race at Fuji Speedway, driving a Nissan R382 along with co-driver Yoshikazu Sunako. Kurosawa drove all 120 laps of the main race.

Kurosawa scored seven of the Nissan Skyline 2000GT-R's fifty competitive wins between 1969 and 1972. In 1973, Kurosawa won the inaugural All-Japan Formula 2000 Championship title, in the first season of top formula racing in Japan. The series exists today as the Super Formula Championship.

On 2 June 1974, during the second round of the Fuji Grand Champion Series, contact between Kurosawa and Moto Kitano on the main straight triggered a multi-car accident. Two drivers, Hiroshi Kazato and Seiichi Suzuki, died from injuries sustained in the accident. Kurosawa was deemed at fault for the crash; in October 1974, he was given a five-year ban from racing by the Japan Automobile Federation (JAF). The ban was later reduced to fourteen months. Criminal manslaughter charges against Kurosawa were pursued, but eventually dropped.

Kurosawa would eventually return to racing following his ban, competing sporadically between the Grand Champion Series, All-Japan Formula Two, endurance, and touring car racing. His last race as a professional driver came in 1988.

After his retirement from racing, Kurosawa became a motor journalist, and also worked as an advisor and test driver for various automotive manufacturers and tyre manufacturers including Bridgestone. He was the main presenter of the Best Motoring automotive video journal series, as well as being a judge for the annual Car of the Year Japan award.

Kurosawa served as the team director for Nova Engineering in the Autobacs Super GT Series in 2006. Afterwards, he established K2 R&D Co. Ltd, which operates current Super GT team LEON Racing. The team is currently managed by his middle son, Haruki, and owned by Daisuke Endo.

== Racing record ==
=== Japanese Top Formula Championship results ===
(key)

Year	Entrant	1	2	3	4	5	6	7	8	DC	Points
1973	Heroes Racing	FUJ; 1	SUZ; 2	SUZ	SUZ; 1					1st	42
1974	Kurosawa Enterprises	SUZ; 1	SUZ	SUZ	SUZ					3rd	12
1977	Tourney Racing	SUZ; 2	SUZ; 3	MIN	SUZ; 5	FUJ; 14	FUJ	SUZ; Ret	SUZ	8th	35
1981	JUSCO Speed Star Racing	SUZ	SUZ; 6	SUZ; 9	SUZ; 8	SUZ; 5				10th	19
1982	Speed Star Racing	SUZ; 7	FUJ; 3	SUZ; 4	SUZ; 6	SUZ; 17	SUZ			6th	32

=== All-Japan Touring Car Championship results ===
Year	Team	Car	Class	1	2	3	4	5	6	DC	Points
1986	Leyton House	Mercedes-Benz 190E	JTC-2	NIS; Ret	SUG	TSU	SEN; Ret	FUJ; Ret	SUZ; Ret	NC	0
1988	Team NOJI	BMW M3	JTC-2	SUZ	NIS	SEN	TSU	SUG; 19	FUJ; Ret	NC	0

Sporting positions
Preceded by None	Japanese Formula 2000; Champion; 1973	Succeeded by Noritake Takahara
