= Prince R380 =

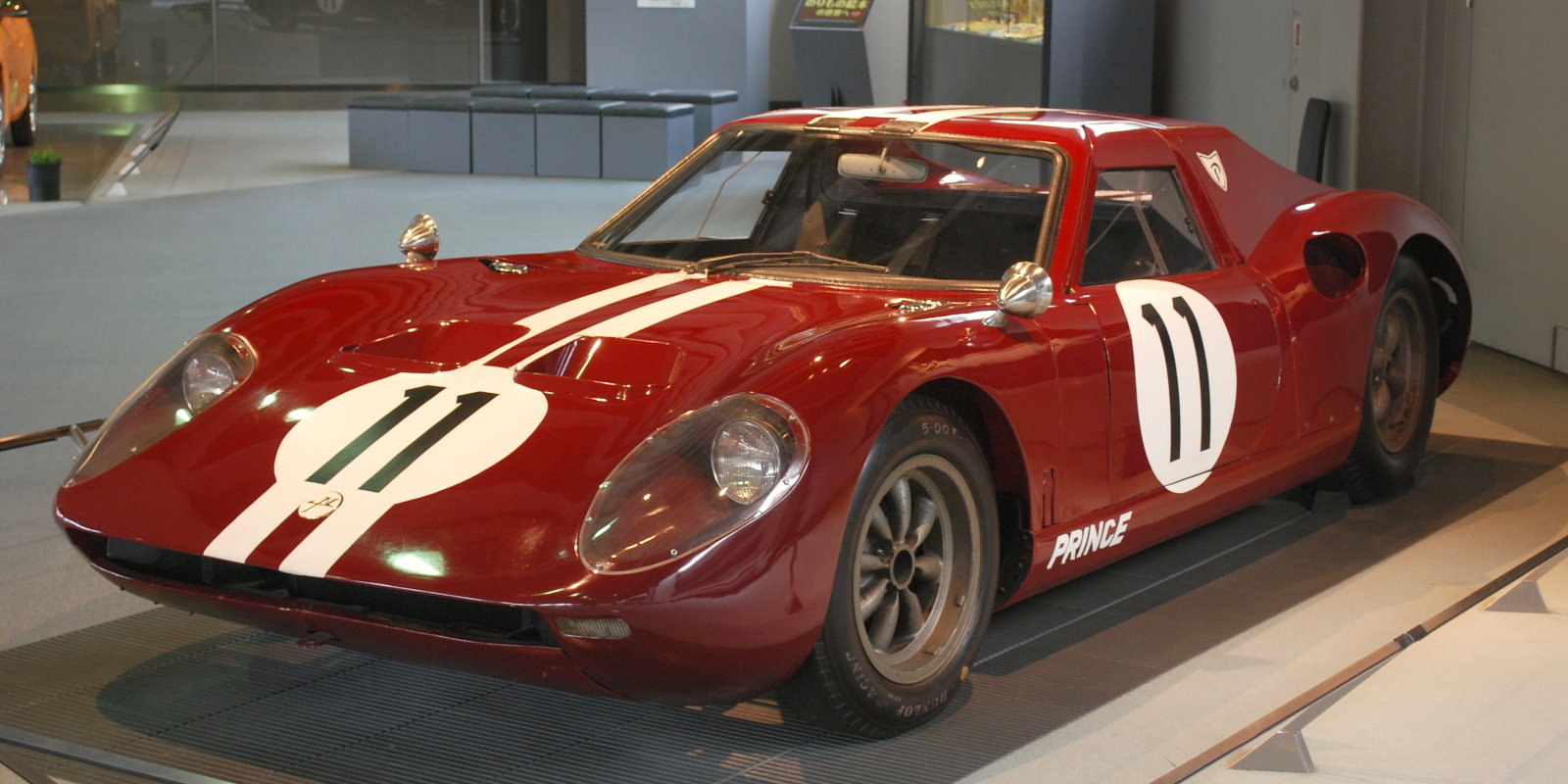

Overview
- Manufacturer: Prince/Nissan
- Production: 1965-1968
- Designer: Shinichiro Sakurai

Body and chassis
- Class: Race car
- Layout: MR layout

Powertrain
- Engine: 2.0L GR-8 I6; 200 hp 220 hp (R380-II)
- Transmission: 5-speed Hewland manual

Chronology
- Successor: Nissan R381

The Prince R380 is a racing car built in 1965 by Prince Motor Company to compete in the Japanese Grand Prix. Following the merger of Prince Motor Company and Nissan Motors in 1966, the R380 was modified into the Nissan R380-II (also known as R380 Mk.II).

== Development ==
In 1964, Prince entered their new S54 Skyline GTs in the second Japanese Grand Prix, hoping to prove the performance potential of the car's new G-7 straight-6. Although the cars performed well, they were defeated by a privately entered Porsche 904, leaving the Skylines to take second through sixth positions.

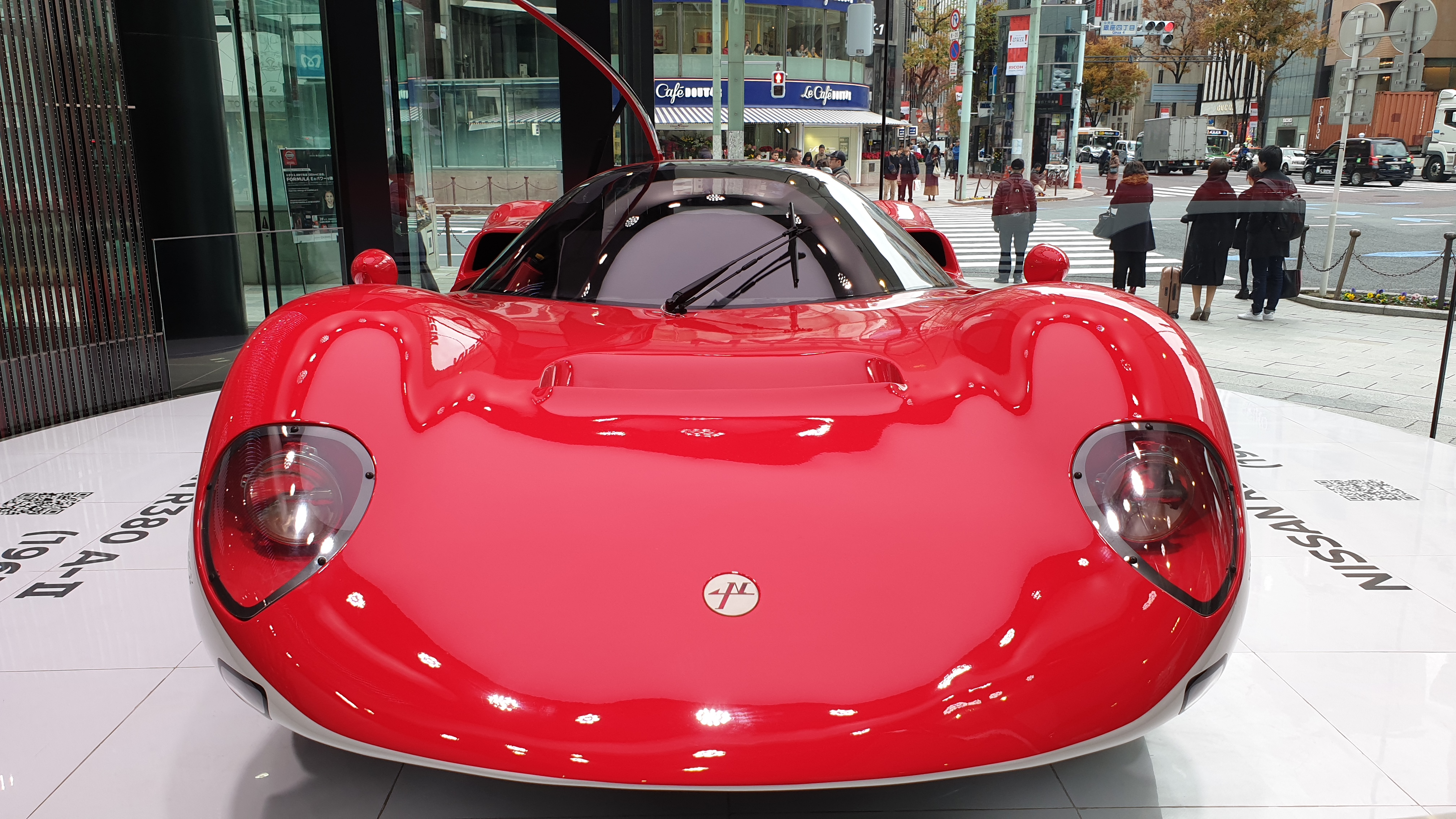
Nissan R380 A-II (1967)

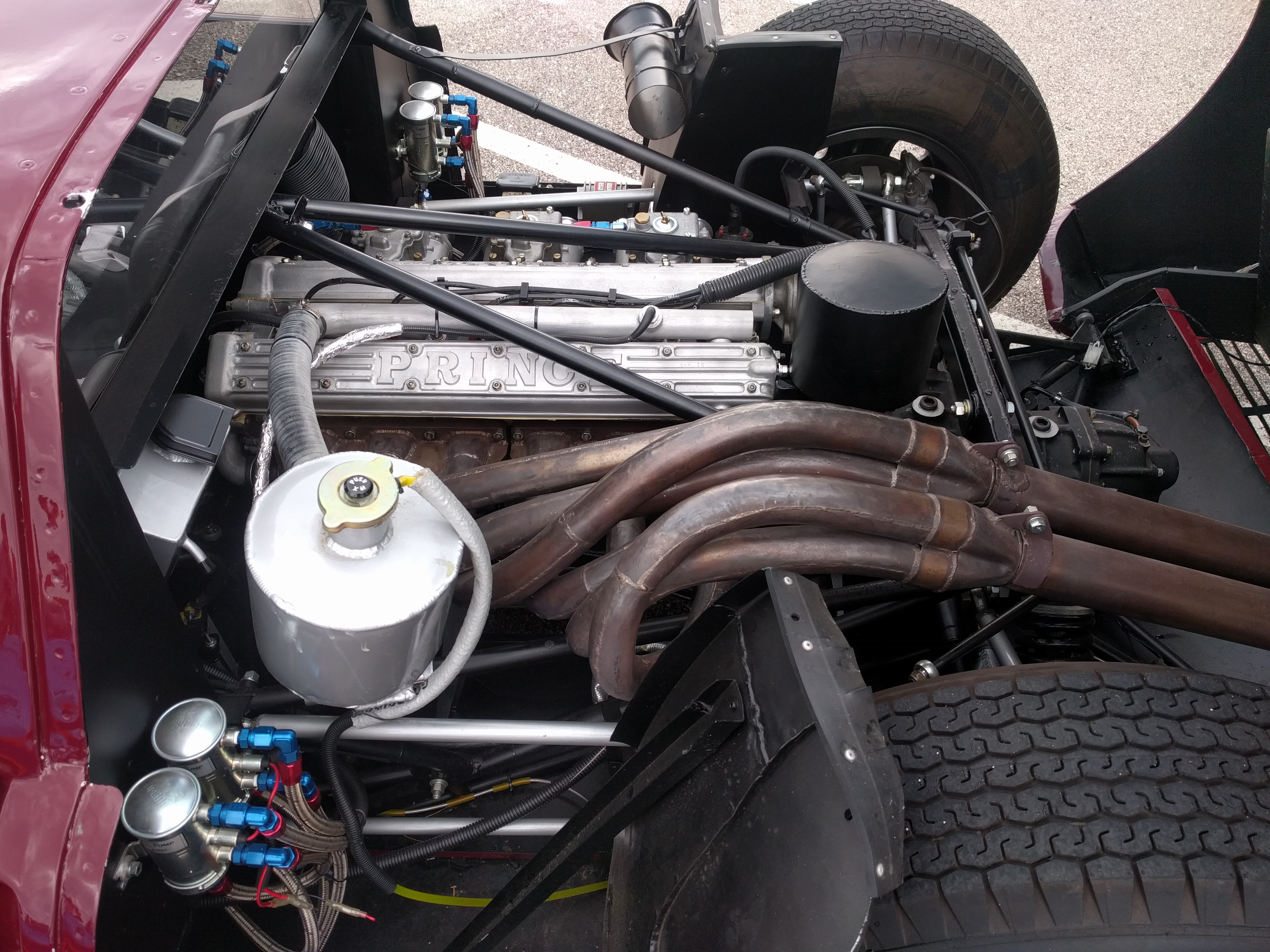
Nissan/Prince GR-8 Engine

Realizing the superiority of the mid-engine design used on the Porsche 904, Prince decided that a custom-built sports car would be needed to win the Japanese Grand Prix. A new aerodynamic body was built on a Brabham BT8 chassis; alloy panels were fabricated with exposed buttresses over the rear engine cover and fitted to Brabham chassis number SC-9-64.

For an engine, Prince used the same G engine that the Skylines had used, but adapted it specifically for racing. The new unit, known as GR-8, was a 1,996 cc straight-6 that produced 200 hp (150 kW). A Hewland 5-speed racing gearbox was used in the transmission.

When Nissan took over the project, the bodywork of the R380 was completely redesigned. The rear buttresses were replaced with a flowing cockpit and engine cover, while the vents and ductwork of the car was further refined. Nissan was able to increase power in the GR-8 engine to 220 hp (164 kW).

== Racing history ==
Due to the cancellation of the Japanese Grand Prix in 1965, the R380 was used by Prince to test high speed aerodynamics. This led to the car being used to break five E-class land speed records in late 1965.

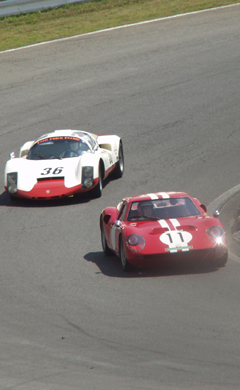
A Prince R380 followed by a Porsche 906.

For the 1966 Japanese Grand Prix at Fuji Speedway, Prince entered four R380s, while a trio of newer Porsche 906s were also entered. In the end, the R380s took the overall victory, with Yoshikazu Sunako's R380 ahead of Hideo Oishi's second place R380.

Following the rebuilding of the R380s by Nissan, four cars were once again entered in the Japanese Grand Prix. However, the 906s were able to overcome the previous year's loss, leaving the R380-IIs to settle for second, third, fourth, and sixth. The margin of victory was nearly two minutes. Nissan later used an R380-II to set new land speed records, breaking seven records in October of that year.

Following Nissan's development of the newer R381 in 1968, the R380s were sold to privateers. Three were once again entered in the Japanese Grand Prix, where they took third, fourth, and fifth places. Two factory-entered Nissan R380A-IIIs finished first and second in the 1969 Chevron Surfers Paradise 6 Hour race at the Surfers Paradise International Raceway in Australia. 1969 saw one R380 taking second place in the 1000 km of Fuji race, and yet another second place in 1970 at a 200-mile (320 km) event at Fuji.

In 2005, Nismo would restore an R380-II and use it for exhibition events, running alongside other cars in the R380 series.
