= Nissan R382 =

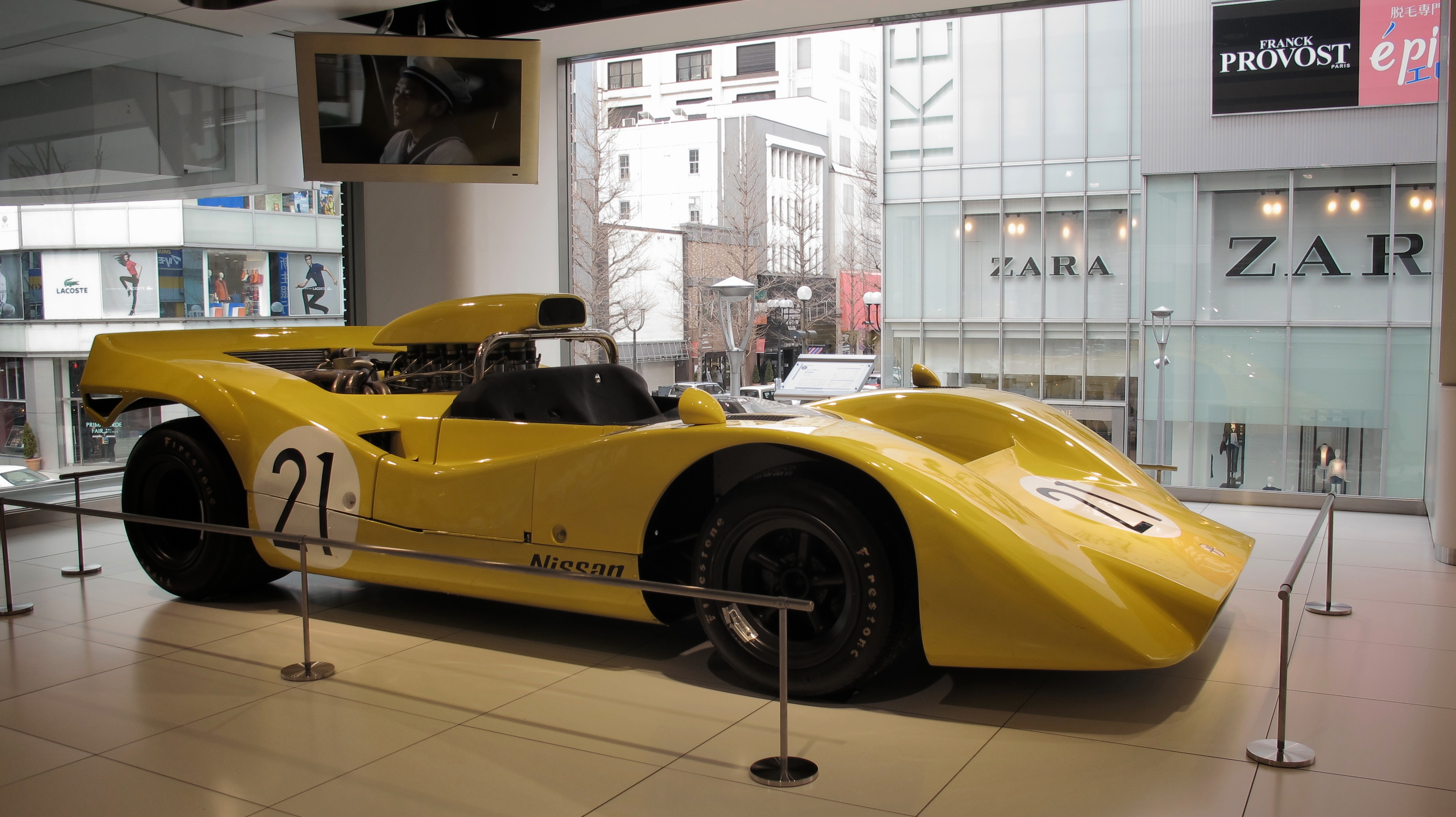

Overview
- Manufacturer: Nissan
- Production: 1969
- Designer: Shinichiro Sakurai

Body and chassis
- Class: Group 7 race car
- Layout: MR layout

Powertrain
- Engine: 6.0L GRX-3 V12, 600 hp @ 7200 rpm

Chronology
- Predecessor: Nissan R381
- Successor: Nissan R383

The Nissan R382 was a racing car built in 1969 by Nissan Motors for competition in the Japanese Grand Prix. Built to the Group 7 motorsports formula, the car featured Nissan's first V12 engine. It was a replacement for the Nissan R381 from the previous year.

== Development ==
Although the previous R381 had shown its potential in terms of aerodynamics and reliability, the car had been unable to use the planned 600 hp 5954 cc V12 engine that Prince was building for Nissan. With the V12 completed soon after the R381 won the Japanese Grand Prix, Nissan turned instead to developing an all-new car to house the V12 engine, now named GRX-3.

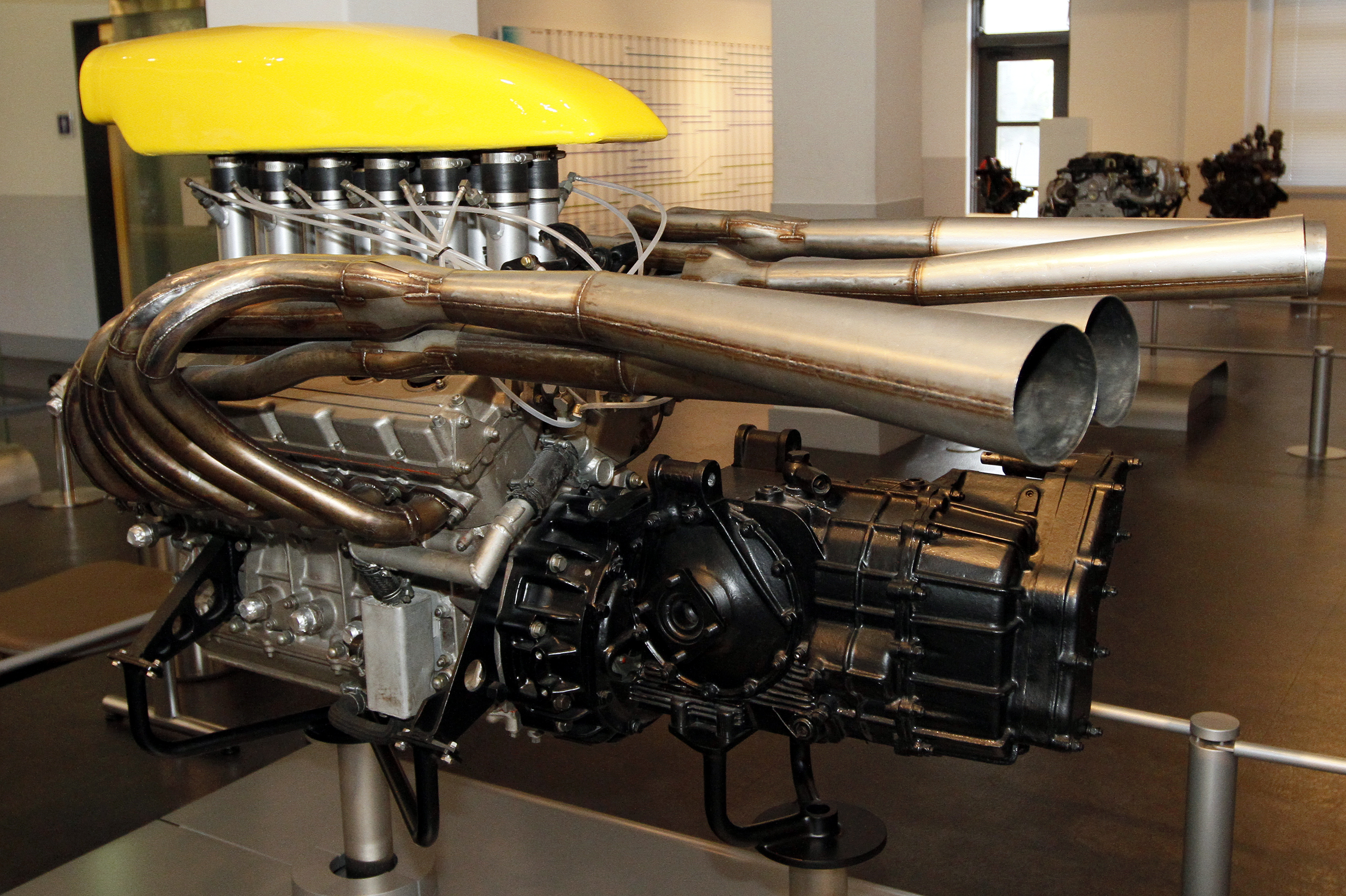
A GRX-II V12 engine

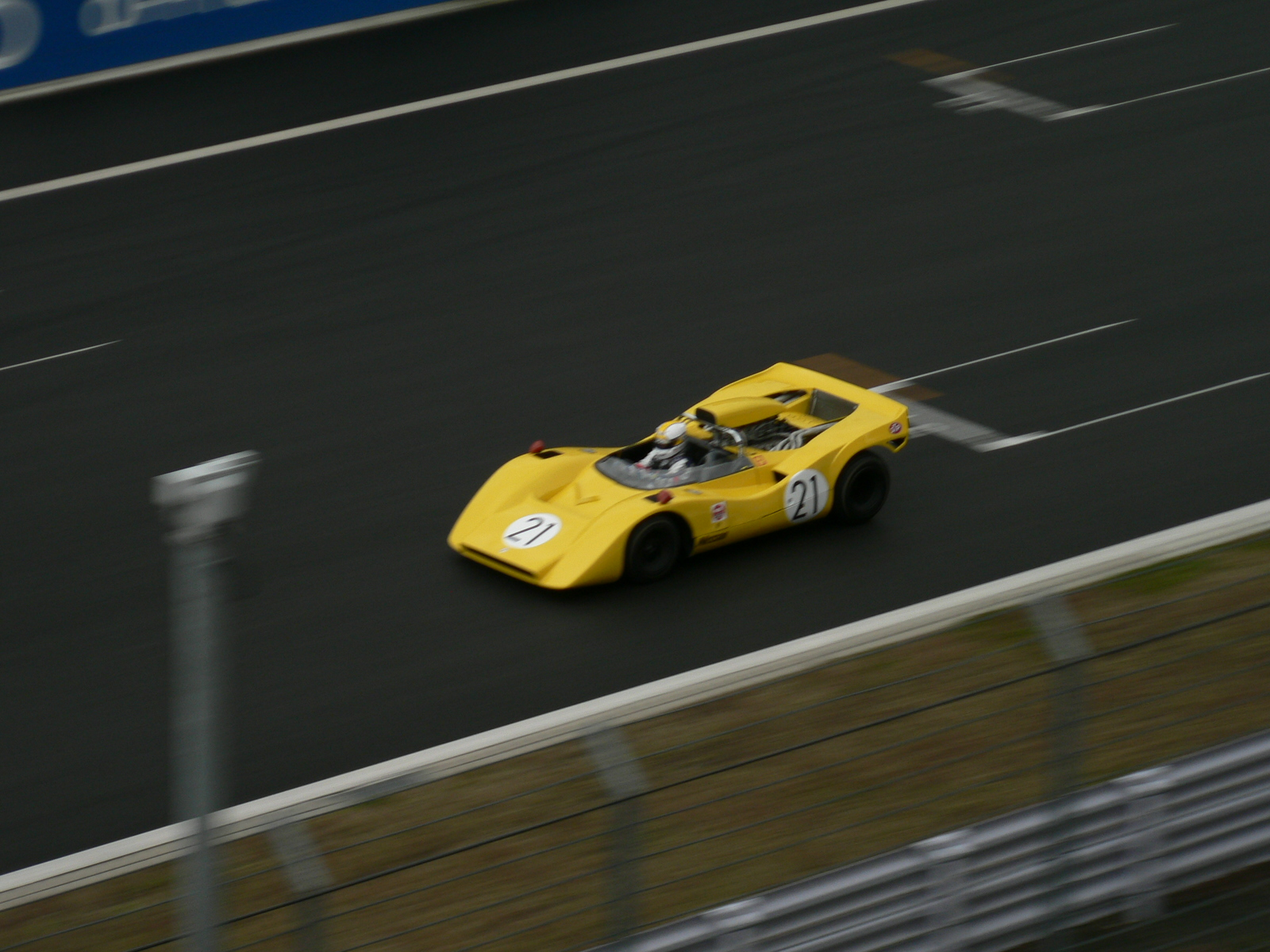
R382 on track

The bodywork of the new open-cockpit R382 was scratch built, sharing nothing with the R381. A wide rectangular front end replaced the rounded front of the R381, while the adjustable rear wings were eliminated due to their being outlawed by the FIA. Instead, a wing was designed into the bodywork of the tail, forming the rear fenders. Instead of allowing air freely through the bottom of the rear wing, a radiator was placed in the opening in order to better cool the new V12 engine. A large intake was also placed on top of the engine in order to better feed air to the motor.

== Racing history ==
For the 1969 Japanese Grand Prix, Nissan was facing more competition than ever before. The Porsche factory decided to bring one of their new 917s to the event with Jo Siffert and David Piper. Various other Porsches were also part of the field. Toyota had been continuing in development of their 7, while Isuzu entered for the first time with their R7-Chevrolets.

With three R382s entered, Nissan was able to dominate the field, taking the top two positions after 320 miles. Motoharu Kurosawa and 1966-winner Yoshikazu Sunako would share the winning car, which finished a lap ahead of the third place Toyota 7.

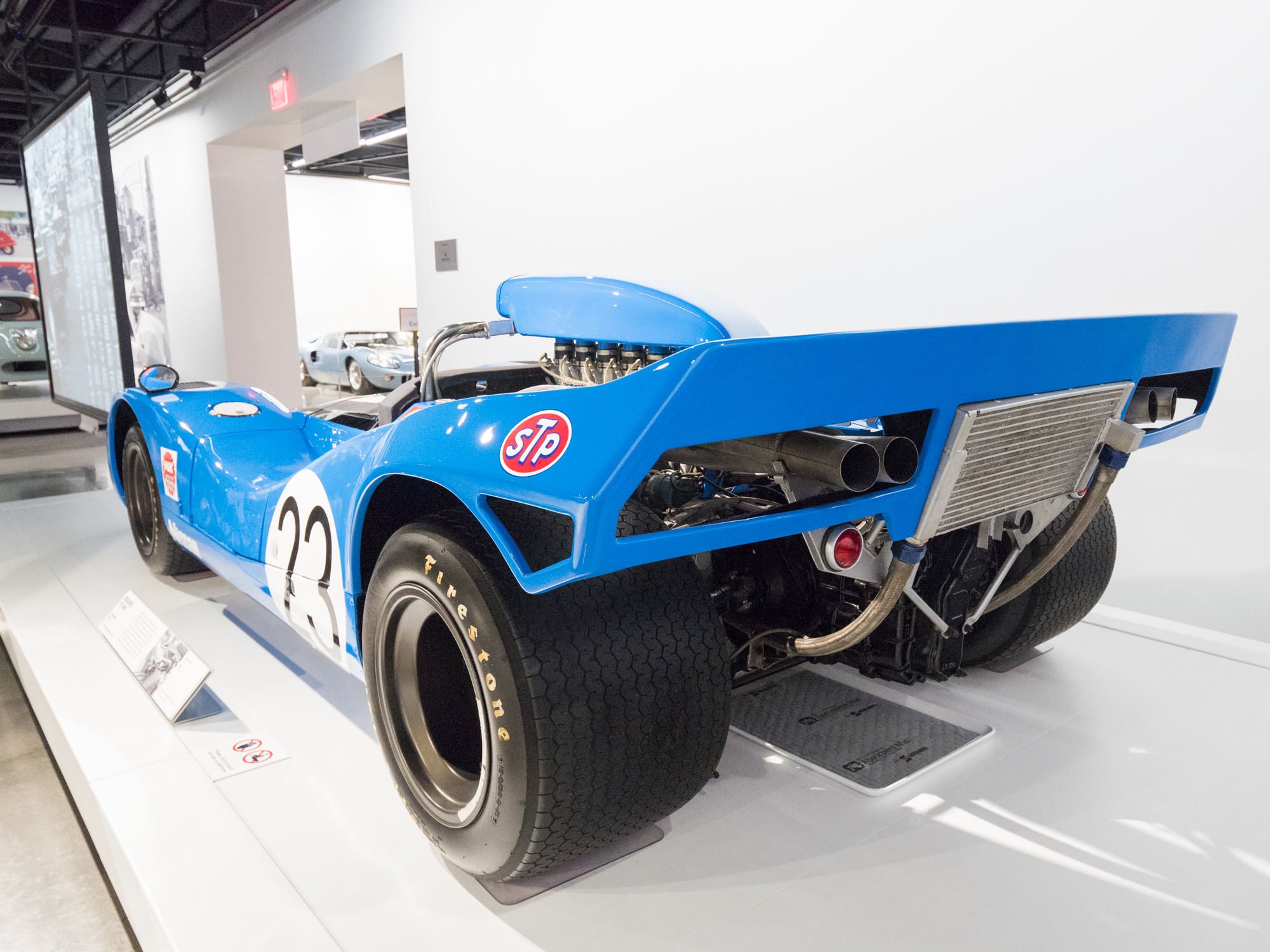
R382 rear end

In 2004, Nismo would restore one of the R382s for use in exhibition events around Japan. The car is usually run with the other cars in the R380 series.
