= Fuji Speedway =

Motorsport track in Japan

- Grand Prix Circuit (2005–present)
- Location: Oyama, Suntō District, Shizuoka, Japan
- Coordinates: 35°22′18″N 138°55′36″E
- Capacity: 110,000
- FIA Grade: 1
- Owner: Toyota Motor (2000–present); Mitsubishi Estate (1965–2000)
- Operator: Fuji Motorsports Forest, Inc. (via Fuji International Speedway Co., Ltd.)
- Opened: 3 January 1966; 60 years ago Re-opened: 10 April 2005; 21 years ago
- Major events: Current: FIA WEC; 6 Hours of Fuji (2012–2019, 2022–present); GT World Challenge Asia (2017–2019, 2022–present); Super GT (1993–2003, 2005–present); Super Formula (1973, 1975–1979, 1982–2003, 2005–present); Super Taikyu; Fuji 24 Hours (1967–1968, 2018–present); Lamborghini Super Trofeo Asia (2012–2019, 2023–present); Former: Formula One; Japanese Grand Prix (1976–1977, 2007–2008); Grand Prix motorcycle racing Japanese motorcycle Grand Prix (1966–1967); Asian Le Mans Series (2013–2018); World Sportscar Championship (1982–1988)
- Website: https://www.fsw.tv/, https://www.fsw.tv/en/

4th and current configuration (2005–present)
- Length: 4.563 km (2.835 mi)
- Turns: 16
- Race lap record: 1:18.426 ( (Brazil) Felipe Massa, Ferrari F2008, 2008, F1)

3rd configuration (September 1987–2003)
- Length: 4.400 km (2.734 mi)
- Turns: 12
- Race lap record: 1:17.025 ( (United Kingdom) Andrew Gilbert-Scott, Lola T93/50, 1994, F3000)

2nd configuration (1975–August 1987)
- Length: 4.359 km (2.709 mi)
- Turns: 8 (10 Turns from 1984 to August 1987)
- Race lap record: 1:14.300 ( (South Africa) Jody Scheckter, Wolf WR1, 1977, F1)

Original Circuit (1965–1974)
- Length: 5.999 km (3.728 mi)
- Turns: 15
- Race lap record: 1:32.570 ( (Australia) Vern Schuppan, March 722, 1973, F2000)

Fuji Speedway (富士スピードウェイ, Fuji Supīdowei) is a motorsport race track standing in the eastern foothills of Mount Fuji, in Oyama, Suntō District, Shizuoka Prefecture, Japan. Originally conceived as an American-style superspeedway, it was completed as a road course and opened in January 1966.

In 1976, Fuji Speedway hosted the first-ever Formula One race in Japan. In the 1980s, the track was used for the FIA World Sportscar Championship and national racing. For decades, Fuji Speedway was owned by Mitsubishi Estate, until it was acquired by Toyota Motor in 2000. The circuit hosted the Formula One 2007 Japanese Grand Prix after an absence of nearly 30 years, replacing the Suzuka Circuit owned by Honda. After Fuji Speedway hosted the 2008 race, the Japanese Grand Prix returned to Suzuka for races from 2009 onward. The Super GT Fuji 500 km race is held at the racetrack on Golden Week.

Fuji Speedway has one of the longest straights in motorsport, at 1.475 km (0.917 mi) in length. The circuit has an FIA Grade 1 license at least until April 2029.

== History ==
=== 1963–79: F1 launches in Japan ===
The construction of Fuji Speedway was planned by the Japan NASCAR Company (日本ナスカー株式会社), which was established in December 1963. The company entered into an agreement with the founder of NASCAR Bill France in January 1964, thereby securing the exclusive rights to host NASCAR-style automobile races within the Far East region. At the same time, it was agreed that a 2.5-mile (4.0 km) high-banked superspeedway would be constructed in Japan. Subsequently, Oyama-cho, located at the foot of Mount Fuji, was selected as the construction site. In July 1964, Charles Moneypenny, the designer of Daytona International Speedway, was invited to Japan to oversee the race track's design, but he soon found out that the proposed site was unsuitable for building a superspeedway due to the steep terrain. Moneypenny sought a consultant's help to rework the project, and retired F1 driver Stirling Moss was hired as a consultant. Inspecting the site in August 1964, Moss dismissed the idea of constructing a Daytona-style oval on such terrain as nonsense. Instead, he argued for a European-style road course and proposed various layouts for it.

In January 1965, the management of the Japan NASCAR Company was overhauled as a result of funding problems. The new management immediately terminated their agreement with NASCAR, and changed the company's name to Fuji International Speedway Corporation. The project was restarted as a European-style road course, with a layout designed to reflect Moss' earlier suggestions. However, a part of the track retained the characteristics of the original superspeedway design: the 30-degree banked first turn. In October 1965, as construction was nearing completion, the project faced further management turmoil; consequently, Mitsubishi Estate stepped in and took over the reins of management. The construction of Fuji Speedway was completed in December 1965 and the circuit opened in January 1966. The track proved to be somewhat dangerous, with the wide banked turn regularly resulting in major accidents. Vic Elford said:

"In 1969 I spent two months in Japan doing a test contract for Toyota and their Toyota 7 (5 litre V-8), which along with a big Nissan (6.3 litre V-12), was destined for CanAm. My last testing and then the subsequent Sports Car GP were at Fuji, but the track was run in a clockwise direction. The reason that banking was so horrific, was that at the end of the straight we went over a blind crest at around 190/200 mph and dropped into the banking. At other tracks (Daytona, Montlhéry, etc.) you climb up the banking. One of the results was that although there were many brave Japanese drivers there were not too many with great skill and the death toll from that one corner was horrendous. To such an extent that the big Gp 7 cars were then banned in Japan and thus, neither Nissan or Toyota ever made it to CanAm."

In 1966 and 1967, the circuit hosted the Japanese motorcycle Grand Prix as the final round of the FIM Road Racing World Championship. The 1966 race was run on the full track with the banking, which meant that the Honda works team did not take part due to safety reasons; the following year, the race was run on a shorter 4.3 km track without the banked section. In 1966, the track hosted a USAC Indy Car non-championship race won by Jackie Stewart. The track had a 24-hour race in 1967.

After a fatal accident in 1974 on the Daiichi banking where drivers Hiroshi Kazato and Seiichi Suzuki were both killed in a fiery accident that injured 6 other people, a new part of track was built to counteract the problem, and the resultant 4.359 km (2.709 mi) course, which also eliminated 5 other fast corners, proved more successful.

The speedway brought the first Formula One race to Japan at the end of the 1976 season. The race had a dramatic World Championship battle between James Hunt and Niki Lauda, and in rainy conditions, Hunt earned enough points to win the title. Mario Andretti won the race, with Lauda withdrawing due to the dangerous conditions. In 1977, Gilles Villeneuve was involved in a crash that killed two spectators on the side of the track, leading to Formula One leaving the speedway. When Japan earned another race on the F1 schedule ten years later, it went to Suzuka instead. The Grand Prix returned to Fuji in 2007 following its renovation.

=== 1980–2000: National racing venue ===
Fuji Speedway former layouts: Red 1966–1974, Blue 1984–1987, Green 1988–2004

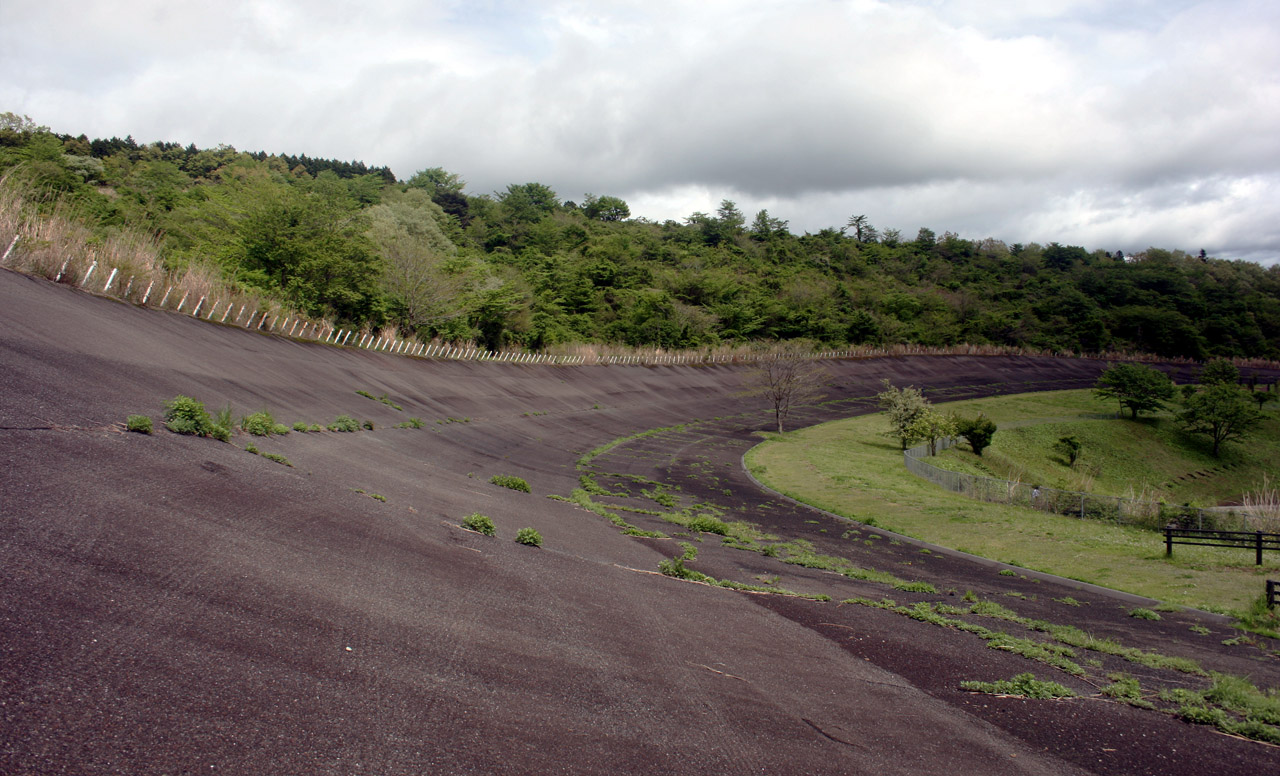
The abandoned "30° Bank" of the old track

Fuji remained a popular sports car racing venue; the FIA World Sportscar Championship visited the track between 1982 and 1988 and it was often used for national races. Speeds continued to be very high, and two chicanes were added to the track: one after the first hairpin corner, the second at the entry to the wide, fast final turn (300R). Even with these changes, the main feature of the track retained its approximately 1.5 km (0.93 mi) long straight, one of the longest in all of motorsports.

The long pit straight has also been utilised for drag racing. NHRA exhibitions were run in 1989, and in 1993 Shirley Muldowney ran a 5.30 on the quarter-mile strip at Fuji. Local drag races are common on the circuit, at both 440 yd (402.336 m) & 1,000 ft (304.800 m) distances.

The track continued to be used for Japanese national races. Plans to host a CART event in 1991 were abandoned due to conflicts with the Fédération Internationale du Sport Automobile. It was not until the autumn of 2000 that the majority interest in the track was bought by Toyota from Mitsubishi Estate as part of its motor racing plans for the future.

On May 3, 1998, there was a multi-car crash during a parade lap before a JGTC race caused by the safety car slowing in torrential rain. Ferrari driver Tetsuya Ota suffered serious burns over his entire body after being trapped in his car for almost 90 seconds, and Porsche driver Tomohiko Sunako fractured his right leg.

=== 2001–present: renovations ===
In 2003, the circuit was closed down to accommodate a major reprofiling of the track, using a new design from Hermann Tilke. The track was reopened on April 10, 2005, and hosted its first Formula One championship event in 29 years on September 30, 2007. In circumstances similar to Fuji's first Grand Prix in 1976, the race was run in heavy rain and mist and the first 19 laps were run under the safety car, in a race won by Lewis Hamilton.

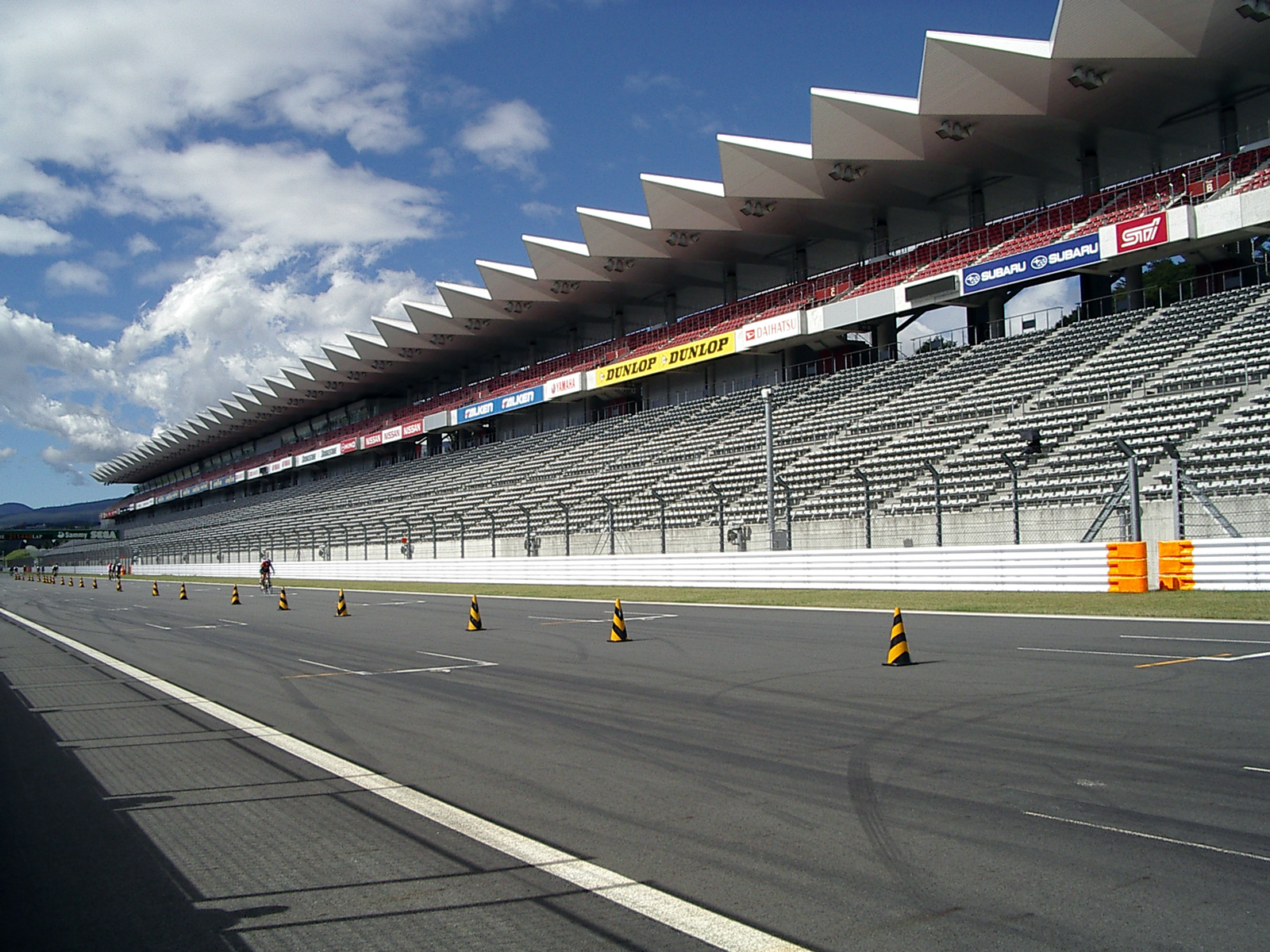
Rebuilt grandstand in the 2000s

The circuit has hosted the Nismo Festival for historic Nissan racers since refurbishment in 2003; the event previously took place at Okayama. When the festival returned in 2005, the organisers allowed circuit owner Toyota to bring in its Toyota 7 Can-Am racer to re-enact an old Japanese GP battle. Toyota also hosts its own historic event a week before the Nismo festival called the Toyota Motorsports Festival. Close to the circuit is a drifting course, which was built as part of the refurbishment under the supervision of "Drift King" Keiichi Tsuchiya and former works driver and Super GT team manager Masanori Sekiya. There is a Toyota Safety Education Center and a mini circuit. In addition to motorsports, Fuji also hosts the Udo Music Festival.

The only time the circuit is run on a reverse direction is during the D1 Grand Prix round, as Keiichi Tsuchiya felt the new layout meant reduced entry speed, making it less suitable for drifting. The series has hosted its rounds since 2003; with the exception of the 2004 closure, the circuit became the first to take place on an international level racetrack and the first of the three to take place on an F1 circuit. The drift course starts from the 300R section and ends past the Coca-Cola corner. With the reprofiling, as cars no longer run downbank, entry speeds have since been reduced, the hill at the exit making acceleration difficult. As part of the 2003 renovations, most of the old banked section of track was demolished. Only a small section remains to this day.

Fuji Speedway was announced to host the finish of the road cycling races at the 2020 Summer Olympics and 2020 Summer Paralympics.

=== 2007 and 2008 Japanese Grands Prix ===
During the 2007 Japanese Grand Prix, Fuji Speedway met with a lot of problems, including the paralysis of the transportation network provided by the shuttle buses, poor facilities including some reserved seats without a view, lack of organization, and expensive meals such as simple lunch boxes being sold for 10,000 yen (US$87) at the circuit.

Newspaper accounts of the event also alleged problems with Toyota bias and control. The circuit prohibited spectators from setting up flags and banners to support teams and drivers, with the exception of the Toyota F1 team. Therefore, there were very few flags and banners in the event compared with other Grand Prix events.

For the 2008 Japanese Grand Prix race, organizers responded to lessons learned the previous year by reducing the total number of spectators allowed at the event. Compared to 140,000 persons allowed for Sunday events in 2007, attendance was restricted to 110,000. Additionally, walkways and spectator facilities were improved, along with larger screens. However, the race was also affected by rainy weather, which has historically interfered in a number of past races at the circuit, and later in 2013, led to interference with a 6-hour endurance race at the track for the FIA World Endurance Championship.

Following both poor ticket sales and weather, it was decided by FOM that the FIA Japanese Grand Prix would be shared between Fuji and Suzuka on alternate years, with Suzuka holding the next race on Sunday, October 4, 2009. After the Great Recession and its own operational deficit, Toyota discontinued the hosting of Japanese Grand Prix beginning in 2010.

=== 2020 Summer Olympics ===
During the 2020 Summer Olympics, which due to the COVID-19 pandemic were postponed to 2021, the speedway was a venue and finish for the cycling races:

- Men's individual road race: on 24 July 2021 Richard Carapaz (ECU) won the gold medal, Wout van Aert (BEL) silver and Tadej Pogačar (SLO) bronze.
- Women's individual road race: on 25 July 2021 Anna Kiesenhofer (AUT) won the gold medal, Annemiek van Vleuten (NED) silver and Elisa Longo Borghini (ITA) bronze.
- Women's road time trial: on 28 July 2021 Annemiek van Vleuten (NED) won the gold medal, Marlen Reusser (SUI) won silver and Anna van der Breggen (NED) won bronze.
- Men's road time trial: on 28 July 2021 Primož Roglič (SLO) won the gold medal, Tom Dumoulin (NED) silver and Rohan Dennis (AUS) bronze.

=== 2022: Fuji Motorsports Forest ===
In April 2022, Toyota announced the construction of the "Fuji Motorsports Forest", which Toyota Fudosan, a real-estate company of Toyota Group, was pushing forward as the "Motorsports Village" project until then. The project precedes the completion of the Shin-Tōmei Expressway and smart interchange near the circuit.

With the regional redevelopment plan centered on Fuji Speedway, the Fuji Speedway Hotel (operated by Hyatt) including the Fuji Motorsports Museum was built on the west side of the circuit and opened in October 2022.

== Events ==
Current

- March: Super Formula Lights
- May: Super GT Fuji 500 km Race, F4 Japanese Championship, Kyojo Cup, Porsche Carrera Cup Asia
- June: Super Taikyu Fuji 24 Hours, Ferrari Challenge Japan, Lamborghini Super Trofeo Asia
- July: GT World Challenge Asia, Super Formula Championship, Japan Cup Series, Porsche Carrera Cup Japan, Kyojo Cup
- August: Super GT, F4 Japanese Championship
- September: FIA World Endurance Championship 6 Hours of Fuji, Porsche Carrera Cup Japan, Formula Regional Japanese Championship, Kyojo Cup
- October: Super Formula Championship, Formula Regional Japanese Championship, Kyojo Cup
- November: Super Taikyu S-Tai Final, Kyojo Cup

Former

- 2020 Summer Olympics
  - Cycling at the 2020 Summer Olympics (2021)
- All-Japan Sports Prototype Championship (1983–1992)
- All Japan Grand Touring Car Championship (1993–2003)
- Asian Le Mans Series
  - 4 Hours of Fuji (2013–2018)
- Audi R8 LMS Cup (2015)
- Ferrari Challenge Asia-Pacific (2014–2019, 2022)
- Formula Challenge Japan (2006–2013)
- Formula D (2015)
- Formula One
  - Japanese Grand Prix (1976–1977, 2007–2008)
- Fuji Grand Champion Series (1971–1989)
- Fuji Long Distance Series (1977–1992)
- GC-21 (2002–2003, 2005–2006)
- Grand Prix motorcycle racing
  - Japanese motorcycle Grand Prix (1966–1967)
- Japan Le Mans Challenge (2007)
- Japanese Touring Car Championship (1985–1998)
- TCR Japan Touring Car Series (2019–2023)
- World Sportscar Championship
  - All Japan Fuji 1000 Kilometres (1982–1988)
- World Touring Car Championship
  - Fuji InterTEC 500 (1987)

== Layout history ==
Fuji Speedway layout history
Fuji Speedway (1965–1974)

Fuji Speedway (1975–1987)

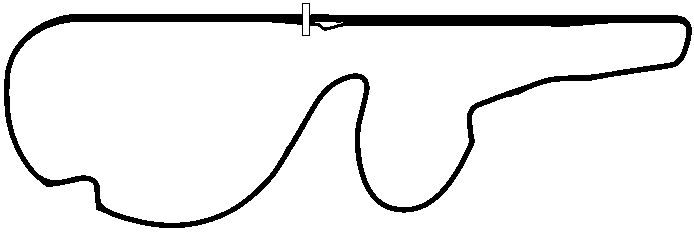
Fuji Speedway (1987–2004)

Fuji Speedway (2005–present)

Layout evolution of Fuji Speedway from 1966 to 2004

== Race lap records ==
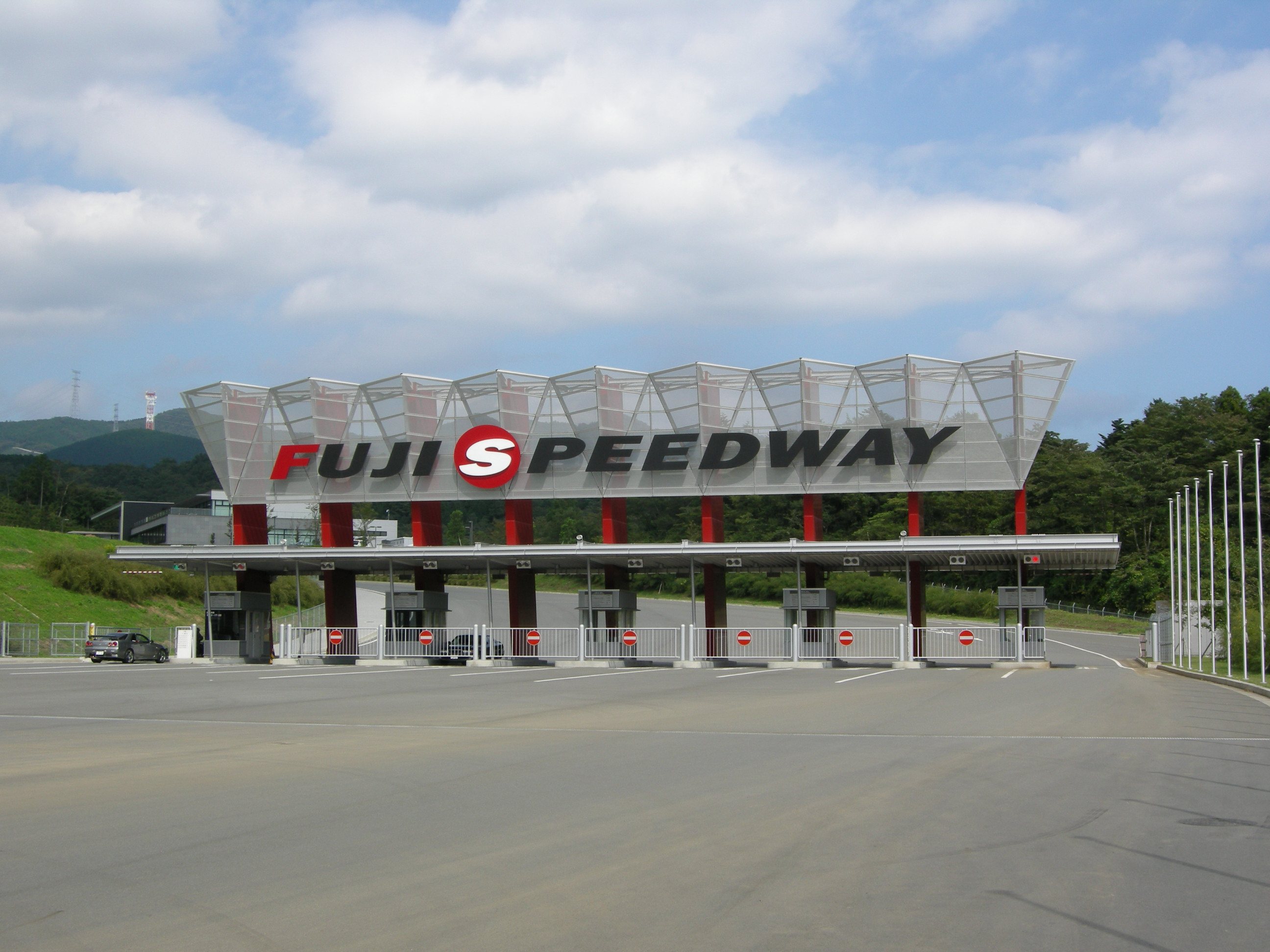
Main gate of the circuit

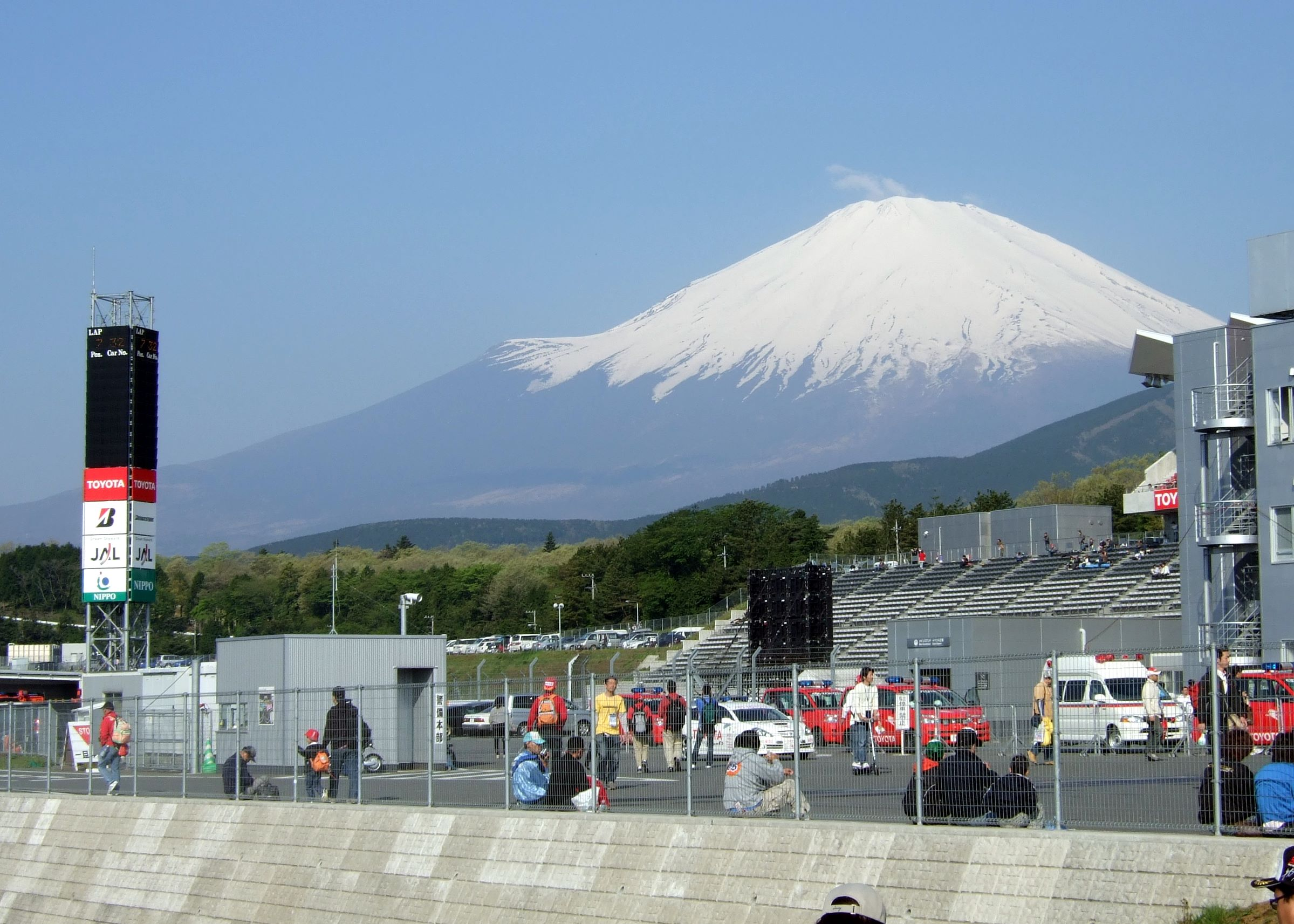
Mount Fuji seen from the speedway

As of September 2026, the fastest official race lap records at the Fuji Speedway are listed as:

Category	Record	Driver	Car	Date
Grand Prix Circuit 4th Configuration (2005–present): 4.549 km (2.827 mi)
Formula One	1:18.426	(Brazil) Felipe Massa	Ferrari F2008	October 12, 2008
Super Formula	1:21.391	(Japan) Nirei Fukuzumi	Dallara SF19	December 20, 2020
LMP1	1:24.645	(France) Loic Duval	Audi R18	October 16, 2016
Formula Nippon	1:27.011	(Germany) Andre Lotterer	Swift FN09	April 5, 2009
Super GT (GT500)	1:28.441	(Japan) Nirei Fukuzumi	Toyota GR Supra GT500	August 3, 2025
LMP2	1:30.042	(Netherlands) Nyck De Vries	Oreca 07	October 6, 2019
LMDh	1:30.486	(France) Victor Martins	Alpine A424	September 27, 2026
LMH	1:30.735	(Japan) Kamui Kobayashi	Toyota GR010 Hybrid	September 11, 2022
Class 1 Touring Car (DTM)	1:31.549	(Germany) Marco Wittmann	BMW M4 Turbo DTM	November 23, 2019
Super Formula Lights	1:32.223	(Japan) Ritomo Miyata	Dallara 320	December 20, 2020
Formula Three	1:34.209	(Japan) Sho Tsuboi	Dallara F317	October 13, 2018
LMP3	1:36.296	(United Kingdom) Nigel Moore	Ligier JS P3	December 9, 2018
Super GT (GT300)	1:36.553	(Japan) Kohta Kawaai	Toyota GR Supra GT300	November 29, 2020
Formula Regional	1:36.775	(Japan) Yuga Furutani	Dome F111/3	September 26, 2021
GT3	1:37.061	(Hong Kong) Alexandre Imperatori	Nissan GT-R Nismo GT3	July 22, 2018
LM GTE	1:37.392	(United Kingdom) Tom Blomqvist	BMW M8 GTE	October 14, 2018
Lamborghini Super Trofeo	1:37.508	(Japan) Kei Cozzolino	Lamborghini Huracán Super Trofeo	July 22, 2018
Ferrari Challenge	1:38.925	(Japan) Sota Muto	Ferrari 296 Challenge	June 22, 2025
Porsche Carrera Cup	1:39.953	(Finland) Marcus Amand	Porsche 911 (992 II) Cup	May 9, 2026
GT1 (GTS)	1:41.195	(Japan) Tomonobu Fujii	Ferrari 550-GTS Maranello	June 2, 2007
Audi R8 LMS Cup	1:41.946	(Hong Kong) Marchy Lee	Audi R8 LMS ultra	October 10, 2015
Formula Challenge Japan	1:42.074	(Japan) Ryo Hirakawa	Tatuus FC106	April 7, 2012
Formula Toyota	1:43.795	(Japan) Takuto Iguchi	Tom's FT30	November 25, 2007
Formula 4	1:44.755	(Japan) Riona Tomishita	KC MG-01	May 9, 2026
TCR Touring Car	1:47.098	(Japan) Anna Inotsume	Honda Civic Type R TCR (FK8)	October 7, 2023
GT4	1:47.213	(Japan) Takeshi Suehiro	Porsche 718 Cayman GT4 RS Clubsport	July 12, 2026
Grand Prix Circuit 3rd Configuration (September 1987–2004): 4.400 km (2.734 mi) & 4.470 km (2.778 mi)
Formula 3000	1:17.025	(United Kingdom) Andrew Gilbert-Scott	Lola T93/50	April 10, 1994
Group C	1:17.574	(Japan) Masahiro Hasemi	Nissan R92CP	May 4, 1992
Formula Nippon	1:17.728	(Japan) Naoki Hattori	Reynard 2KL	April 7, 2002
LMGTP	1:18.806	(Japan) Ukyo Katayama	Toyota TS020	November 7, 1999
Fuji Grand Champion Series	1:21.800	(Japan) Masanori Sekiya	March 89GC	October 29, 1989
JGTC (GT500)	1:25.134	(Japan) Takuya Kurosawa	Toyota Supra (JZA80)	July 28, 2002
Formula Three	1:26.344	(Japan) Tatsuya Kataoka	Dallara F302	April 6, 2003
GT1	1:30.822	(Australia) David Brabham	McLaren F1 GTR	May 4, 1996
Formula Toyota	1:32.293	(Japan) Yokomizo Naoki	Tom's FT20	November 25, 2001
Group A	1:32.867	(Sweden) Anders Olofsson	Nissan Skyline GT-R R32	November 8, 1992
JGTC (GT300)	1:32.872	(Japan) Shinsuke Shibahara	Vemac RD320R	May 4, 2002
Super Touring	1:34.138	(United Kingdom) Anthony Reid	Nissan Primera GTe	November 3, 1996
GT	1:34.320	(Japan) Atsushi Yogou	Porsche 911 (996) GT3-R	May 4, 2000
Superbike	1:36.833	(Japan) Noriyuki Haga	Yamaha YZF750	June 22, 1997
250cc	1:38.215	(Japan) Daijiro Kato	Honda NSR250	June 22, 1997
125cc	1:44.017	(Japan) Shinya Sato	Honda RS125R	June 23, 1996
Grand Prix Circuit 2nd Configuration (1966–August 1987): 4.359 km (2.709 mi) & 4.410 km (2.740 mi) & 4.441 km (2.760 mi)
Formula One	1:14.300	(South Africa) Jody Scheckter	Wolf WR1	October 22, 1977
Formula Two	1:18.310	(Japan) Satoru Nakajima	March 842	April 15, 1984
Formula 2000	1:18.810	(Japan) Kazuyoshi Hoshino	March 742	August 8, 1976
Group C	1:19.228	(West Germany) Stefan Bellof	Porsche 956	October 2, 1983
125cc	1:39.640	(United Kingdom) Bill Ivy	Yamaha RA31A	October 14, 1967
USAC IndyCar (anti-clockwise)	1:22.490	(United Kingdom) Jackie Stewart	Lola T90	October 9, 1966
Original Grand Prix Circuit (1965–1974): 5.999 km (3.728 mi)
Formula 2000	1:32.570	(Australia) Vern Schuppan	March 722	May 3, 1973
Formula Libre	1:52.670	(Australia) Leo Geoghegan	Lotus 39T	May 3, 1969
Group 7	1:52.810	(Japan) Moto Kitano	Nissan R381	May 3, 1968
Group 6	2:00.800	(Japan) Tetsu Ikuzawa	Porsche 906	May 3, 1967
Group 4	2:05.000	(Japan) Ginji Yasuda	Lola T70	May 3, 1967
250cc	2:05.870	(United Kingdom) Phil Read	Yamaha RD05	October 15, 1966
Group 3	2:15.530	(Japan) Ginji Yasuda	Jaguar XK-E	May 3, 1966
50cc	2:26.510	(Japan) Yoshimi Katayama	Suzuki 50 GP	October 15, 1966

== Corners ==
This is the official listing of the twelve corners that make up the current circuit layout, in use since 2005. Only some corners have Japanese names, most of which are a result of sponsorship agreements. The rest are named after the radius of the corner in metres.

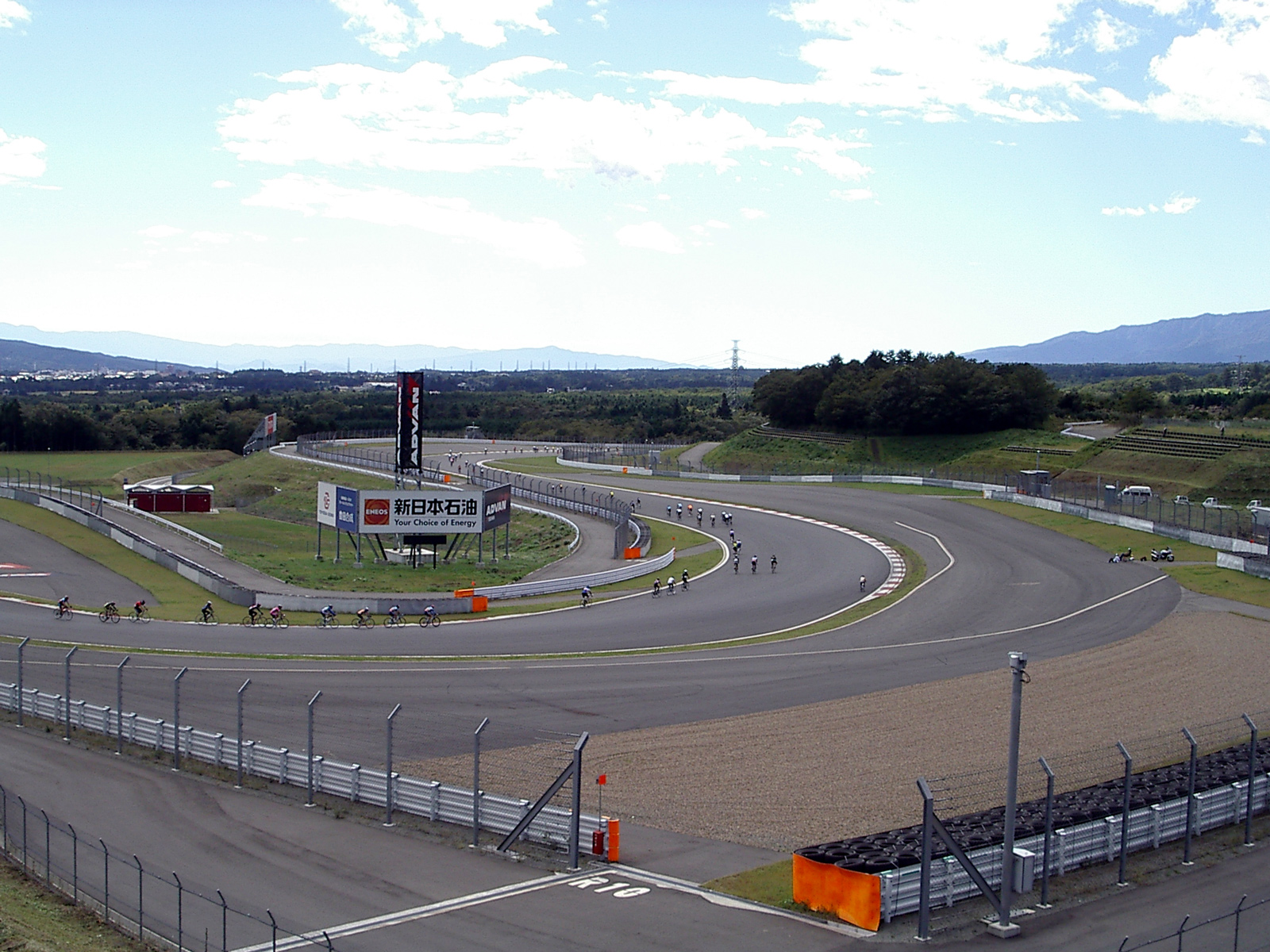
The sixth corner hairpin

1. TGR Corner (27R)
2. 75R
3. Coca-Cola Corner (80R)
4. Toyopet (100R)
5. Advan Corner (30R)
6. 120R
7. 300R
8. Dunlop Corner (15R)
9. 30R
10. 45R
11. GR Supra Corner (25R)
12. Panasonic Corner (12R)

The Dunlop corner differs with the configuration used. In the full configuration, it consists of a tight right hairpin turn followed by a left-right flick. In the GT course, it is a medium-speed right-hander, bypassing turns 11 and 12.

== In media ==
=== Video games ===
The Fuji circuit is represented in the arcade racing game Pole Position and is one of the four selectable tracks in Pole Position II. The track's layout in both of these games is the 1975-1987 one, which was current as of the time of each game's release.

Fuji is also featured in Project CARS 2, Top Gear, TOCA Race Driver, Gran Turismo 4: Prologue, Gran Turismo 4, Tourist Trophy, Gran Turismo 5: Prologue, Gran Turismo (PSP), Gran Turismo 5, Gran Turismo 6, Gran Turismo Sport, and Gran Turismo 7. For F1 Challenge '99–'02, Grand Prix Legends, rFactor, GTR 2 – FIA GT Racing Game, GT Legends, Assoluto Racing, Race 07, the track is available as free downloadable content. The track is also available in Grid Legends and iRacing as paid downloadable content.

=== Television ===
The Fuji circuit is featured prominently in the Japanese television drama Engine as the main setting for the show's racing scenes, as well as being the home of the (fictional) "Regulus Cup".

The track was also featured in an episode of the 11th season of the British automotive show Top Gear, in which host Jeremy Clarkson drives a Nissan GT-R.

Part of the Gaki no Tsukai 2013 New Year's Holiday No-Laughing Earth Defense Force punishment game was also shot at Fuji Speedway.

The circuit was featured in the opening scene of a tokusatsu series known as Dennou Keisatsu Cybercop.

The anime Overtake! takes place at Fuji Speedway.
