= Nissan R381 =

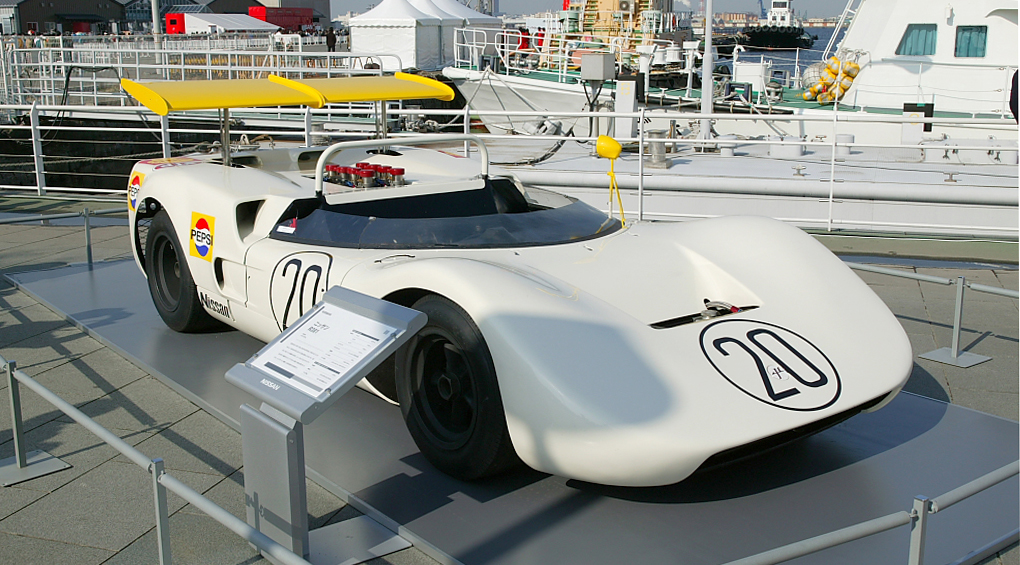

Overview
- Manufacturer: Nissan
- Production: 1968
- Designer: Shinichiro Sakurai

Body and chassis
- Class: Race car
- Layout: MR layout

Powertrain
- Engine: 5.5L Chevrolet V8, 450 hp

Chronology
- Predecessor: Nissan R380
- Successor: Nissan R382

The Nissan R381 was a racing car developed by Nissan Motors in 1968 for use in the Japanese Grand Prix. It was the successor to the Nissan R380-II, which had been originally developed by the Prince Motor Company

== Development ==
Following the defeat of the Nissan R380-II at the 1967 running of the Japanese Grand Prix, Nissan set about developing an improved car for the 1968 event. Aware of the new CanAm series in North America that ran under the new Group 7 classification, the new R381 became a much more powerful and faster car in comparison to the previous model.

Knowing that the original Prince GR8 Straight-6 would not be powerful enough, Nissan planned to use a new Prince-built V12. However the engines were not completed in time (partially due to this being the first time Nissan or Prince had constructed a V12), so the company turned to a Chevrolet 5.5L V8 which produced nearly 450 hp, twice the amount of the Prince GR8. Also borrowing from CanAm, most notably Chaparral, large rear wings were placed on the new design. These dual wings placed side by side could be driven by hydraulics that moved either the left or right wing up or down in order to increase cornering ability.

For bodywork, the R381 was initially an evolution of the R380's coupe design. The rear tail was lengthened and the engine cover made flat in order to increase rear downforce in conjunction with the rear wing. The back of the car was also made flat, with a Kamm tail effect. However, upon becoming aware of the new Toyota 7 car which also ran in Group 7 rules, Nissan chose to cut the roof of the R381 off. A thin windshield was all that remained, while a tiny rollbar was placed on the engine cover.

== Racing history ==
Debuting at the fourth Japanese Grand Prix, three R381s fought alongside three older R380-IIs as well as three of the new Toyota 7s. Several Porsches also made up the field. The entire Nissan contingent performed well, taking five of the top six spots, with a Porsche 910 taking second. The R381 of Moto Kitano took the race win.

Following the Japanese Grand Prix, the R381 was replaced by the newer R382, which featured an entirely Nissan-built engine. In 2005, Nismo restored an R381 and now currently runs it in exhibition events along with the rest of the R380 series.
