= Nissan R383 =

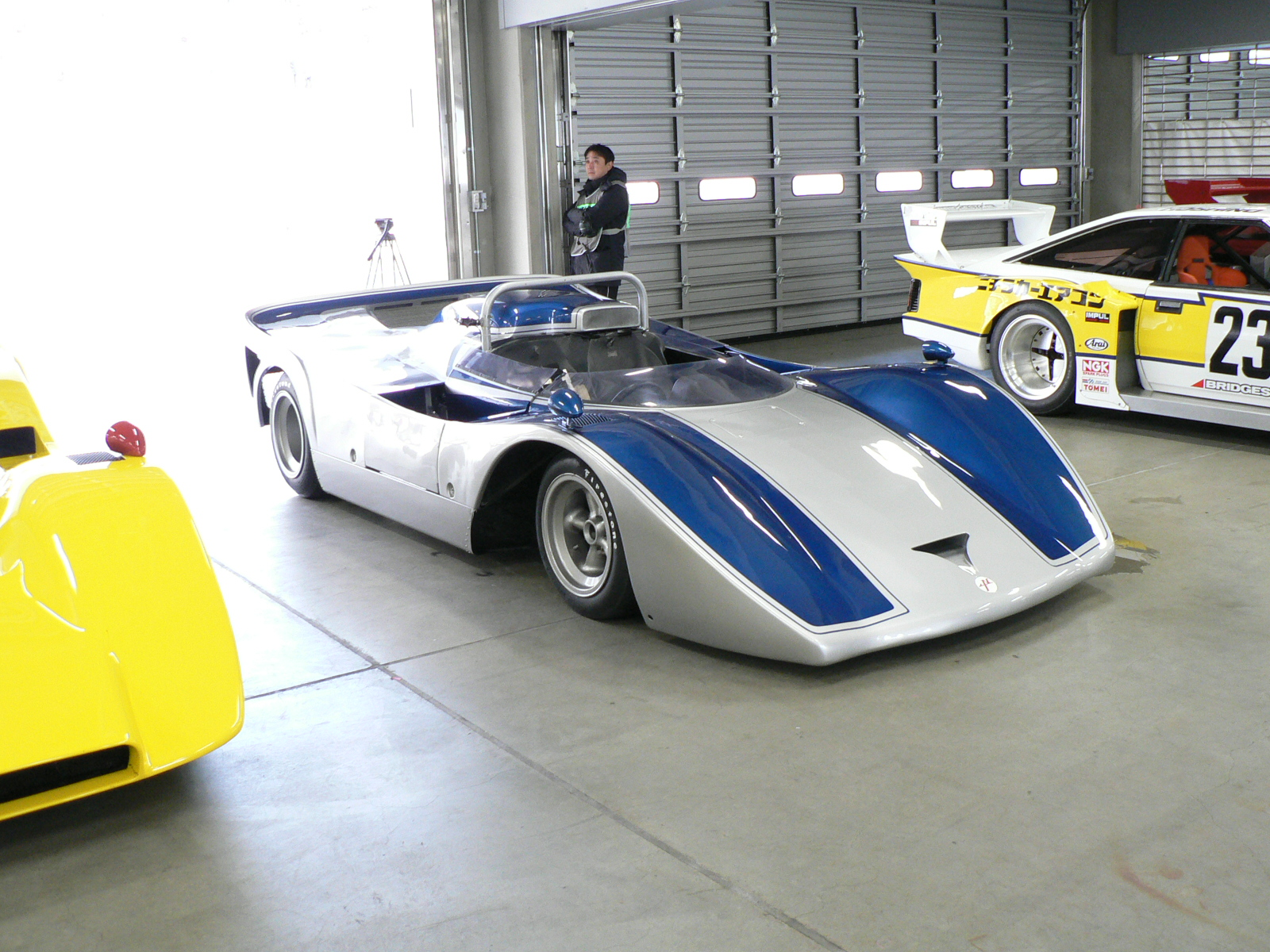

Overview
- Manufacturer: Nissan
- Production: 1970
- Designer: Shinichiro Sakurai

Body and chassis
- Class: Group 7 race car
- Layout: MR layout

Powertrain
- Engine: 6.0L GRX-3 V12; 700 hp 900 hp (with turbo)

Chronology
- Predecessor: Nissan R382
- Successor: Nissan R390 GT1

The Nissan R383 was a race car built in 1970 by Nissan Motors that was planned for use in the 1970 Japanese Grand Prix. Replacing the Nissan R382, it would be the final racing sportscar built by Nissan until the mid-1980s.

== Development ==
Wishing to expand on the R382's winning formula even further, the R383 borrowed heavily from Can-Am cars running the Group 7 formula in North America. The R383 would retain the GRX-3 5954cc V12 engine from the R382, yet would see power improved to 700 hp.

Nissan concentrated on the aerodynamics however, with concentration on the downforce the car would be able to create. The venting on the nose of the R382 was removed, leaving the entire frontal area of the R383 flattened. This meant that the car's radiators were now moved to the sides of the car, with large vents placed in the car's doors. The air intake for the V12 engine was also aerodynamically redesigned, now being placed below the rollbar in order to allow more air to the rear wing, as well as slightly off center of the cockpit in order to avoid the driver's helmet blocking the intake.

The R383 was also tested with a turbocharger added to the V12 engine, allowing for an increase of output to 900 hp.

== Racing history ==
The R383s were planned to be entered at the 1970 Japanese Grand Prix, against heavy competition from Porsche, Toyota, Isuzu, and others. However the race would be canceled by the Japanese Automobile Federation (JAF) after Nissan and Toyota withdrew from the event, leaving the R383 without anywhere to race. Nissan would cancel the R380 program soon after, meaning the R383 never raced.

In 2006, Nismo took up the task of restoring an R383 to working condition. The car currently runs at exhibition events alongside other cars in the R380 series.
