= Nissan Y engine =

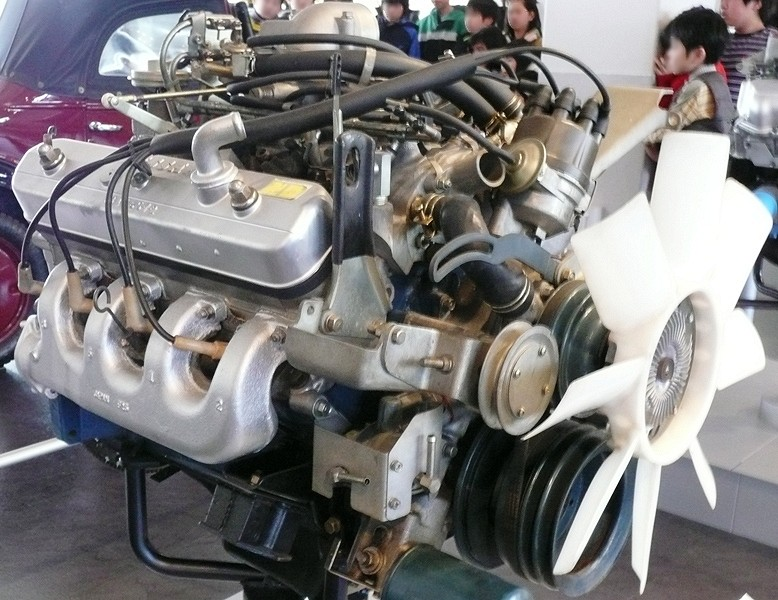
- Y44E engine

Overview
- Manufacturer: Nissan (Nissan Machinery)
- Production: 1965–1989

Layout
- Configuration: Naturally aspirated V8
- Displacement: 4.0 L (3,988 cc)
- Cylinder bore: 92 mm (3.62 in)
- Piston stroke: 75 mm (2.95 in)
- Valvetrain: OHV, 2 valves per cylinder
- Compression ratio: 9.0:1

Combustion
- Fuel system: 4-bbl. carburetor Electronic FI (since 1975)
- Fuel type: Gasoline
- Cooling system: Water-cooled

Output
- Power output: 195–200 bhp 145–149 kW; 198–203 PS
- Torque output: 323–343 N⋅m; 238–253 lb⋅ft

Chronology
- Successor: Nissan VH engine

The Y engine is a family of V8 engines designed and produced by Nissan between 1965 and 1990 for limousines. The Y engine was replaced in 1990 with the Nissan VH engine.

== Y40 ==
The Y40 was a water-cooled OHV V8 engine produced for the Nissan President limousine between 1965 and 1973. It displaces 4.0 L (3,988 cc) with a bore and stroke of 92 mm × 75 mm (3.62 in × 2.95 in). It has 16 valves (two per cylinder) and a 4-barrel carburetor and 9.0:1 compression ratio. It produces 195 PS (143 kW; 192 hp) at 5000 rpm and 237 lb⋅ft (321 N⋅m) at 3200 rpm.

This V8 engine was developed before the merger with Prince Motor Company and was not directly related to Prince's W64 V8, used exclusively in the Prince Royal limousine.

Applications:

- 1965-1973 Nissan President
- 1965-1971 Nissan Cedric Patrol Y130 series

== Y44 ==
The Y44 is an OHV V8, 16 valve, 4 barrel down draught carb engine produced for the Nissan President and since 1975 used electronic fuel injection. It produced 200 PS (147 kW; 197 hp) at 4800 rpm and 343 N⋅m (253 lb⋅ft) at 3200 rpm. In 1975, Nissan introduced its emission regulation technology called NAPS (Nissan Anti Pollution System).

Applications:

- 1974-1989 Nissan President

== See also ==
- List of Nissan engines
- Nissan W64 engine
- Nissan President
