= Kozo Watanabe (engineer) =

Japanese automotive engineer (born 1942)

Kozo Watanabe 渡邉 衡三
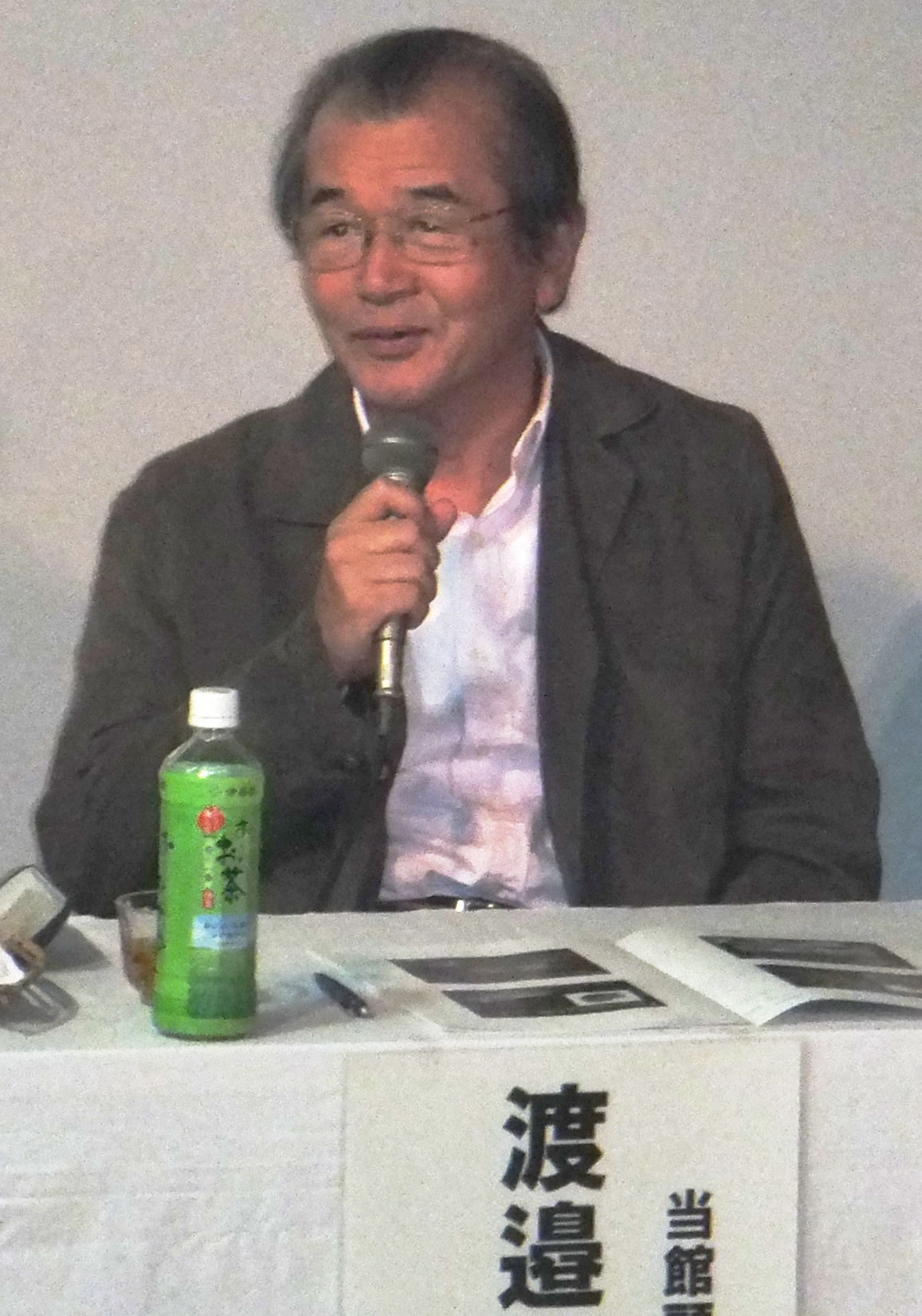
- Watanabe at the Prince & Skyline Museum in Okaya, Nagano in 2013
- Born: 24 September 1942 (age 82); Osaka Prefecture, Japan
- Education: Tokyo University
- Occupation: Engineer
- Engineering career
- Discipline: Mechanical engineering
- Significant design: Nissan Skyline (R33); Nissan Skyline (R34)

Kozo Watanabe (渡邉 衡三, Watanabe Kōzō, born 1942) is a Japanese automotive engineer who was responsible for the development of the ninth generation Nissan Skyline (R33) and the tenth generation Nissan Skyline (R34).

== History ==
=== Early days ===
As a boy, he was a car enthusiast who loved motor sports. He saw the Prince cars being completely defeated at the 1st Japanese Grand Prix held at Suzuka Circuit in 1963.

In March 1967, one month before he joined Nissan, he went to Europe to watch a Formula 1 race.

He wanted to join Brabham or another F1 car manufacturer. In Japan, he wanted to join the Prince Motor Company which produced the R380 racing car.

=== Joining Nissan ===
He joined Nissan in April 1967 and was assigned to the Prince Division, which had recently been merged into Nissan in August 1966, located in Ogikubo, Tokyo, as he hoped. The main building was the former Nakajima Aircraft Company's Tokyo Plant facility.

He was assigned to Design Group No. 2 of the Design Department No. 1 headed by two managers. One of them was Shinichiro Sakurai, the other was Ushio Fuyuki. One of Sakurai's subordinates Naganori Itō held direct responsibility over Watanabe. Itō who would later take over Sakurai's responsibilities.

Itō instructed Watanabe and allowed him to design some parts of C10 Skyline GT-R's suspension.

One day, Watanabe said to Sakurai that he would like to design a racing car.
Sakurai said, "Come on. No way. You must learn about the production cars first. It's impossible for you to design a racing car now."

But gradually, Itō allowed him to design some parts of the suspension of the racing cars such as R381 and R382.

=== Collision safety (Experimental Safety Vehicle Division) ===
In 1970, he was assigned to the ESV (Experimental Safety Vehicle) Division in Tsurumi, Yokohama to research collision safety.

=== Return to Ogikubo ===
In 1973, he was once again assigned to the Chassis Department in Ogikubo, a department to which Itō had been promoted to manager. As a result of many engineers being assigned to the vehicle emissions control project, Itō and Watanabe were one of few people who designed or improved the chassis of the former Prince vehicles such as the later version of Skyline C110, Pulsar and Nissan Prince Homer truck. (On the other hand, genuine Nissan vehicles were designed at Nissan Tsurumi Design Center in Yokohama.)

One thing he can never forget during his Ogikubo days is that he had a chance to repair the Nissan Prince Royal limousine.

After he repaired it and sent it back to the Imperial Household Agency, he was presented a pack of Imperial Gift Cigarettes with the Chrysanthemum Seal printed on them.

=== Assigned to plan the strategies ===
In 1985, he was assigned to the Strategy Department of Nissan headquarters.
At this time, he wrote the "screen play" for each of the Nissan cars. For example, the character and image of the cars.

He also discussed which cars should be exported and which cars should be sold domestically.

=== Assigned as the Chief Experiment Engineer of R32 ===
In 1985, he was assigned to the Vehicle Experiment Department. He tested N13 Pulsar, and its variants Exa, Langley and Liberta Villa.

In 1987, he was sent to Nissan Tochigi Plant in Kaminokawa, Tochigi to test the R32 Skyline under the command of Itō, the chief engineer. He tested the R32 carefully and with insistence. He collected the data and provided them to Itō.

He brought an R32 to the Nürburgring, Germany with his test team. The event marked the completion of the R32, paving the way to its début.

=== Chief engineer of R33 ===
Just after the R33 Skyline project started, he was assigned as the chief engineer of R33.

Nissan headquarters told him to make the R33 wider and longer than the R32 to improve passenger comfort. Consequently, the R33 would be heavier than the R32, but Watanabe was aiming to produce a faster car having declared that "R33 GT-R has to be faster than R32 GT-R". In particular, he carefully designed the suspension. When the a BCNR33 GT-R was taken to the Nürburgring to be tested, the lap time finally became twenty one seconds shorter than that of BCNR32 GT-R. Consequently, the slogan "Minus 21 Seconds Romanticism" was used for the television advertisements.

=== R34 - the last straight-6 Skyline ===
He was again assigned as the chief engineer of the next (tenth) generation R34 Skyline.

One of their long-time concerns was weight distribution. Watanabe once tried to abandon the heavy RB engine and tried to use a lighter V6 engine.

However, it was cancelled, because it would cost too much to change the layout of the vehicle. So, he continued to use a straight-six engine.

Although in late 1990s and early 2000s, the GT car and the sports car were not popular in Japan, Watanabe and his team completed the R34 as the ultimate Skyline.

Furthermore, the BNR34 GT-R is the last "Skyline GT-R" so far. (Nissan separated the GT-R from the Skyline line-up.)

=== Recent years ===
In 1999, he was promoted to the Executive Director of NISMO and supervised the entire Nissan motor sports project. Whenever NISMO sold the Z-tune R34 Skylines to the customers at the NISMO headquarters, Watanabe was present to congratulate the new owners.

He retired from NISMO in 2006.

He is currently the advisor of the Prince & Skyline Museum in Okaya, Nagano. He often appears at the Skyline festivals or the Skyline talk shows with Itō.

Incidentally, the fifth generation C210 Skyline is the only Skyline which he was not involved in until he being assigned as the Executive Director of NISMO in 1999.

== See also ==
- Nissan
- NISMO
- Nissan Skyline
- Nissan Skyline GT-R
- Shinichiro Sakurai
- Naganori Ito
