= Ryoichi Nakagawa =

Japanese engineer

Ryoichi Nakagawa 中川 良一
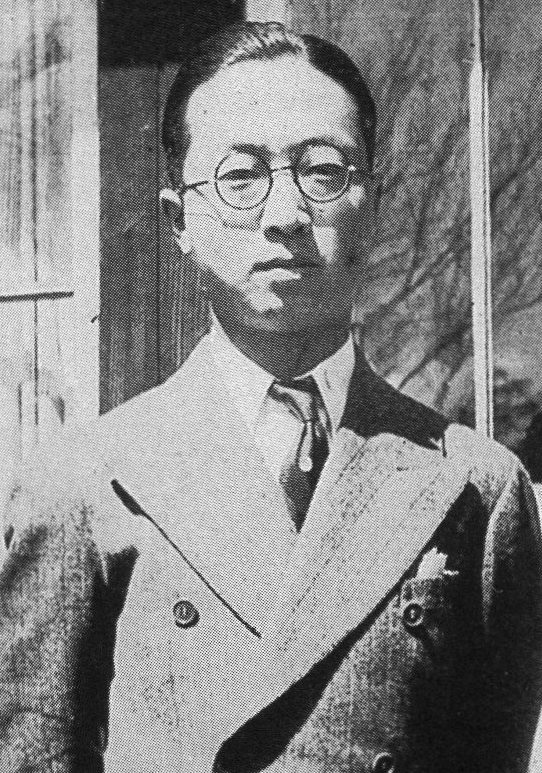
- Ryoichi Nakagawa at the age of 26 in 1939 or 1940
- Born: 27 April 1913; Tokyo, Japan
- Died: 30 July 1998 (aged 85)
- Education: Tokyo Imperial University
- Engineering career
- Discipline: Mechanical engineering
- Significant design: Nakajima Homare engine (Ha-45)
- Significant advance: Nakajima Sakae engine
- Awards: Japan Automotive Hall of Fame (2018)

Ryoichi Nakagawa (中川 良一, Nakagawa Ryōichi; 1913–1998) was a Japanese aircraft/automotive engineer. He graduated from Tokyo Imperial University in 1936 and joined Nakajima Aircraft Company in the same year.

== Career ==
He improved Nakajima Sakae engine for Mitsubishi A6M Zero, Nakajima Ki-43 and other planes. He was the chief designer of Nakajima Homare engine for Nakajima Ki-84, Nakajima C6N, Kawanishi N1K and others.

After World War II, Nakajima Aircraft Company was disbanded and was banned from producing aircraft by the GHQ. It was divided into 12 companies. Two of them were Fuji Heavy Industries (Subaru) and Fuji Precision Industries (Prince Motors). Prince Motor Company operated out of the old Nakajima premises in Ogikubo, Tokyo and Nakagawa was appointed the senior engineering manager, leading its engineers. He supervised all the Prince vehicles projects including Skyline, Gloria, R380, S390P-1 Royal limousine and others. Nakagawa was the motivating force behind Prince's early use of Italian design houses, and went on to use the knowledge gained to promote and guide Japanese designers like his protégé Shinichiro Sakurai.

He received a Doctorate of Engineering from his old school Tokyo University in 1961.

After the merger of Prince and Nissan in August 1966, he was promoted to the senior executive director of Nissan in 1969.

Later he became the chairman of the Society of Automotive Engineers of Japan, Inc. (JSAE). He was elected to the National Academy of Engineering in 1990.

He died on July 30, 1998.

== See also ==
- Nakajima Aircraft Company
- Nakajima Sakae
- Nakajima Homare
- Mitsubishi A6M Zero
- Nakajima Ki-43
- Nakajima Ki-84
- Nakajima C6N
- Kawanishi N1K
- Prince Motor Company
- Prince G engine
- Prince Skyline
- Prince Gloria
- Prince R380
- Prince Royal
- Jiro Tanaka
- Shinichiro Sakurai
- Nissan
- Nissan S20 engine
- Nissan R382
