= Nissan President =

Series of executive luxury limousines manufactured by Nissan

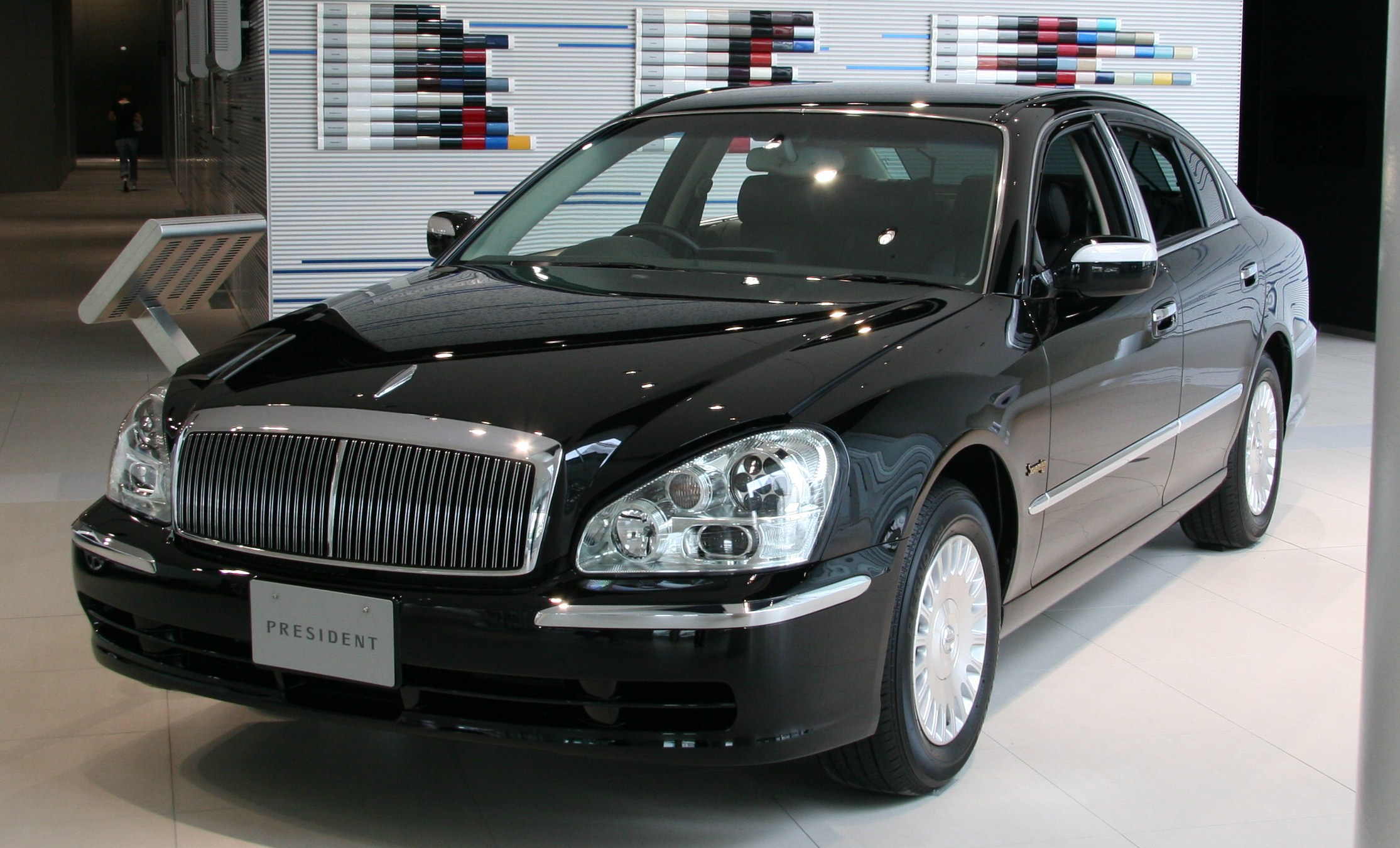
- 2009 Nissan President (PGF50)

Overview
- Manufacturer: Nissan
- Production: October 1965 – August 2010
- Assembly: Japan: Oppama, Yokosuka, Kanagawa (1965–1989); Japan: Kaminokawa, Tochigi (1990–2010)

Body and chassis
- Class: Full-size luxury car (F)
- Body style: 4-door sedan
- Layout: Front-engine, rear-wheel-drive

Chronology
- Predecessor: Nissan Cedric Special (50)
- Successor: Integrated with Nissan Cima (Y51)

The Nissan President (Japanese: 日産・プレジデント, Nissan Purejidento) is a Japanese luxury sedan that was manufactured and marketed by Nissan from 1965 until 2010 as the flagship of Nissan's range, available only at its Nissan Motor Store dealerships, then at Nissan Blue Stage dealerships.

Initially marketed only in Japan as an executive limousine, exports began to a few countries, including Singapore and Hong Kong, though sales were limited. When the President was introduced in 1965, it was marketed under the "Nissan" badge, unlike other Nissan products at the time, which were marketed under the Datsun brand.

== First generation (1965–1973) ==
Nissan President
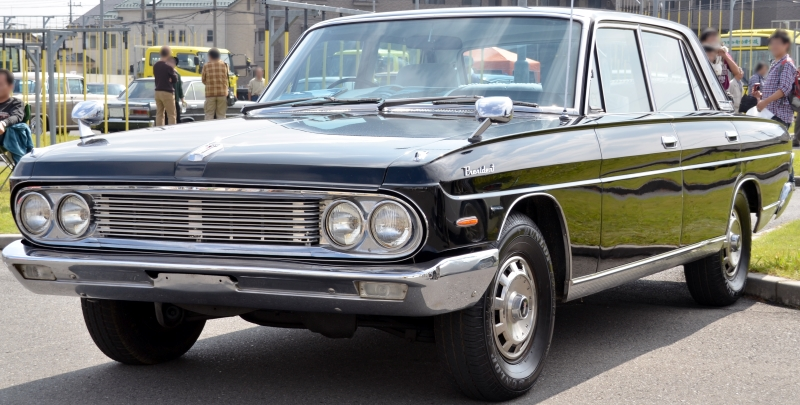
- Nissan President series H150

Overview
- Model code: H150
- Production: 1965–1973

Powertrain
- Engine: 3.0 L H30 I6 (150); 4.0 L Y40 V8 (H150)
- Transmission: 3-speed automatic; 3-speed manual (Spec-A)

Dimensions
- Wheelbase: 2,850 mm (112.2 in)
- Length: 5,045 mm (198.6 in); 5,280 mm (207.9 in)
- Width: 1,795 mm (70.7 in)
- Height: 1,460 mm (57.5 in)
- Curb weight: 1,600 kg (3,527 lb)

The first generation of the President, designated H150, was introduced in October 1965, replacing the Cedric Special as Nissan's top-of-the-range model, and was exclusive to Japanese Nissan dealerships called Nissan Motor Store. Ownership costs of the fully hand-built President were elevated because its external dimensions and engine displacement placed it in the top road tax bracket. The President appeared after the Toyota Crown Eight debuted in 1963, and Nissan developed it as a possible submission for a limousine to be used by the Imperial Household Agency of Japan. As a corporate limousine, the President was joined by the Mitsubishi Debonair, which was primarily used by corporate Mitsubishi executives.

Its appearance is very similar to the smaller but more popular Nissan Bluebird introduced earlier in 1964. Like the Bluebird, the President was built at Nissan's Oppama plant in Yokosuka, Kanagawa. A small number (fewer than 200) of left-hand drive models were also built, available for export but mainly sold to Japan's foreign missions and to Japanese companies abroad. These were designated HL150. The front wheels used double wishbone suspension with leaf spring and a live axle for the rear.

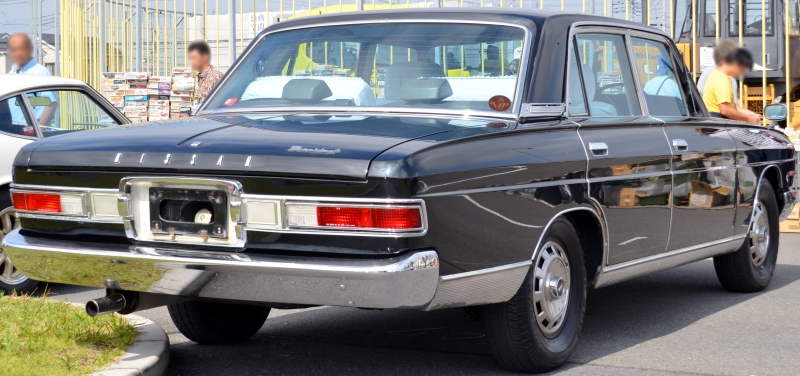
Nissan President series H150 rear view

The President was available with either the 4.0-litre Y40 V8 engine with 180 PS (132 kW), developed specially for that model, or the 3.0-litre H30 straight-six. From the outside, the V8 is easiest identified by its twin exhaust, whereas the six only has a pipe on the left side. Very lavishly appointed for its time, the President served as the official car of the Japanese Prime Minister Eisaku Satō, while the Emperor of Japan was transported in one of four Nissan Prince Royals developed by Prince Motor Company. Each President was individually tested and fully run in before delivery. The availability of a V8 was regarded as an extravagant feature once it's realized that urban two-way streets are usually zoned at 40 km/h (25 mph) or less, as mentioned in the article Speed limits in Japan.

In 1971 Nissan offered EAL (Electro Anti-lock System) as an option on the President; this became Japan's first electronic ABS (Anti-lock braking system). There were a few trim levels, but most were sold as the fully loaded Spec-D that featured the "Full Power Equipment" specification with power seats, power windows, twin A/C units, central door locks, plenty of interior lights and remote-controlled auto-tuning radio, among other features. All trim packages came with a split bench for the rear seat that provided a power recline opposite the driver. The Spec-C was similar to the Spec-D, but without the power features. Spec-B was powered by the 130 PS (96 kW) H30 engine carried over from the Cedric Special 50. The base Spec-A was also powered by the H30, but had a 3-speed column-shift manual, the only version with a manual transmission as Spec-B, C and D had an automatic transmission. Few changes were made to the 150 series, but in October 1971 the outside mirrors were moved closer to the front of the car, the location of the windshield wipers was changed to increase the amount of glass they swept, and the automatic transmission was changed from Borg-Warner to Nissan. This change was announced by the installation of a badge reading "Nissan Matic" at the rear, instead of the earlier "BW Automatic". The Spec-C trim level was dropped after 1971; all V8 models were now only available in Spec-D.

== Second generation (1973–1990) ==
Nissan President
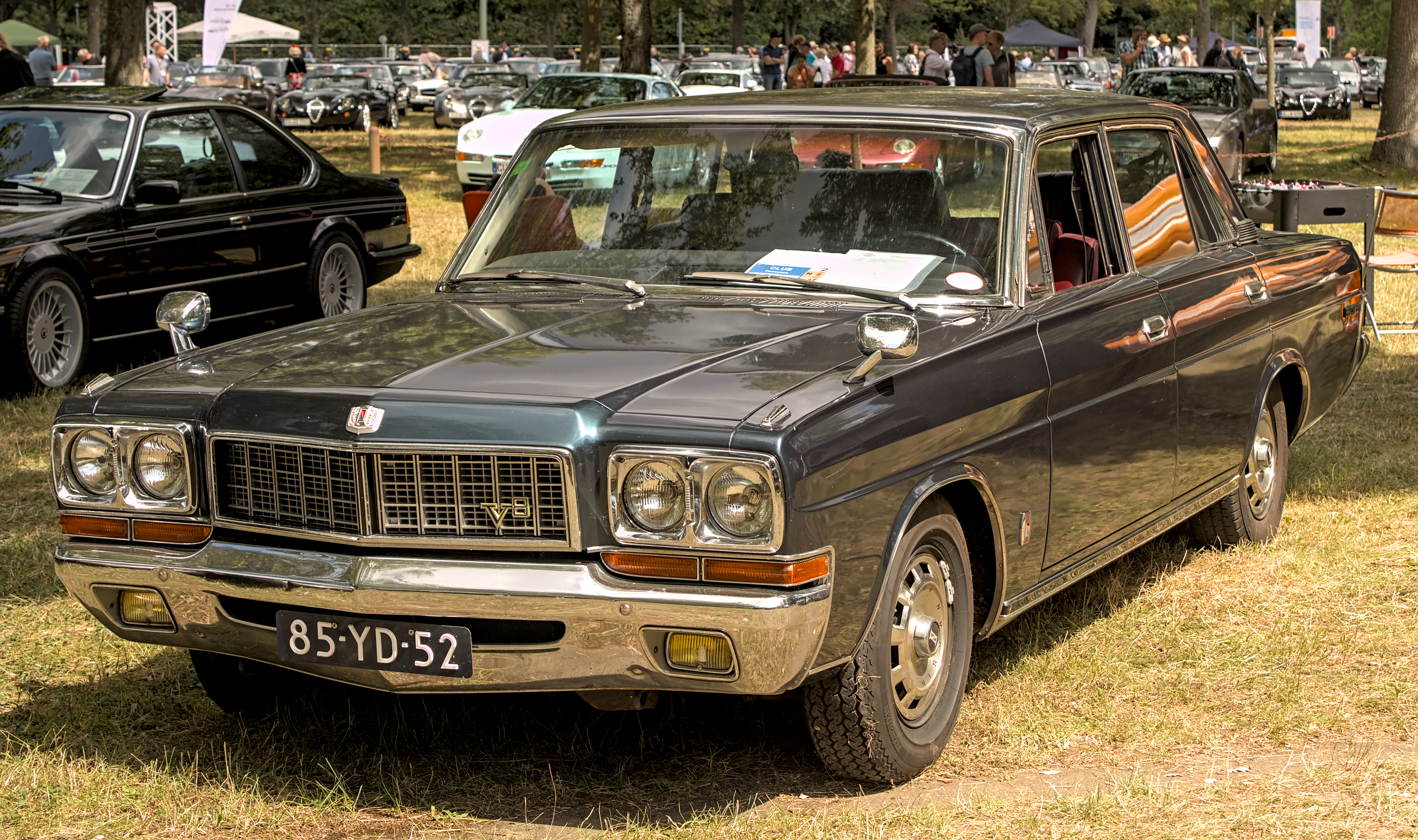
- 1976 Nissan President series H250

Overview
- Model code: H250
- Production: August 1973 – October 1990

Powertrain
- Engine: 3.0 L H30 I6 (250); 4.4 L Y44E V8 (H250-252)
- Transmission: 3-speed automatic; 3-speed manual (type A)

Dimensions
- Wheelbase: 2,850 mm (112.2 in)
- Length: 5,045 mm (198.6 in); 5,280 mm (207.9 in)
- Width: 1,795 mm (70.7 in)
- Height: 1,460 mm (57.5 in)
- Curb weight: 1,600 kg (3,527 lb)

The second generation, designated 250 (H250 for the V8 versions), was introduced in August 1973. It received a thorough facelift inside and out, while the chassis was essentially the same with no changes to the front and rear suspension. The center section of the body, including the doors and windshields, remained as before, but the front and rear ends were redesigned - stretching the car by 235 mm (9.3 in), mostly by extending the rear overhang. The Y40 engine was replaced by the new 4.4-liter Y44. The H30 six-cylinder remained available until 1974 or 1975. The original lineup consisted of two six-cylinder models, type A (three-speed manual) and type B (automatic) and one eight-cylinder model called the type D (automatic only). The car only came with a column-mounted shifter, while the front seats were either separate or a bench. The rear seats were semi-separate and intended to seat two occupants in comfort. The D-type had standard power front seats and also power adjustable rear seat. The President was a very expensive car in Japan - the annual car taxes for the V8 were ¥54,000 in 1973; the average annual salary for a recent university graduate were ¥57,000 at this time.

In April 1975, all trim levels except the type D were dropped, which meant the H30 engine and manual transmission were dropped as well; all Presidents would have V8 engines and automatic transmissions going forward. At the same time, the V8 engine received electronic fuel injection, becoming the Y44E and allowing the car to meet new, stricter emissions standards. The V8 emblem on the bootlid was changed to one that reads "V8E" along with the Nissan NAPS badge. The chassis code was changed to A-H250. The type D was available in nine different sub-models listed as D-1 through D-9. The top versions had power everything, satin weave nylon seats, an early form of anti-lock brakes, and automatic climate control. This model was also the first Nissan to be equipped with a digital clock.

In July 1976, the engine was modified to meet the 1976 emissions regulations and the model code changed to C-H251. The luxurious Sovereign trim was added in August 1977, when the emissions were again updated to meet the 1978 requirements. This iteration received the E-H252 model code and a redesigned grille. The type C trim level also returned in 1978. In March 1980 the stereo was updated to an AM/FM cassette unit, and a slave clock was added.

In November 1982, the President was updated with suspension improvements, a larger fuel tank, a new instrument cluster and dashboard, a new grille, and the replacement of the round headlights with square halogen versions while maintaining the general exterior and interior appearance. After minor detail improvements and stereo alterations in June (after which bias-ply tires were no longer available) and December 1984, the Sovereign VIP trim (with air sprung rear seat and other additional comforts) was added in January 1985. In March 1986 the Nissan emblems were altered and the rear headrests became adjustable.

Minor changes followed in November 1988, when the types C and D received the same wheel covers as the Sovereign, and in March 1989 when a shift lock was added. Production of the 250 series continued until October 1990, with a total of 33,128 units having been registered in Japan. Power output had been listed in gross horsepower until January 1990, when the President was brought in line with the rest of the industry. The claimed power figure dropped from 200 to 165 PS (147 to 121 kW) net, but actual output and performance were unchanged.

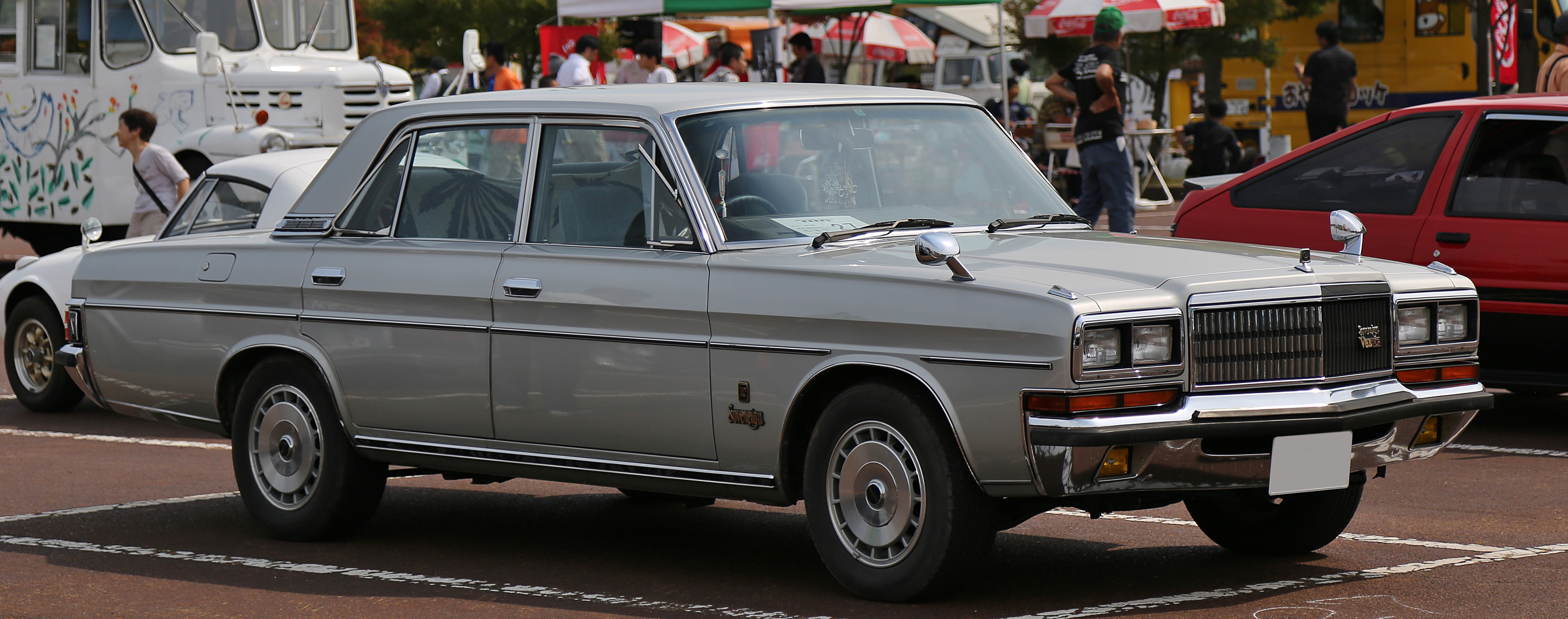
1985-1990 Nissan President Sovereign VIP series H250

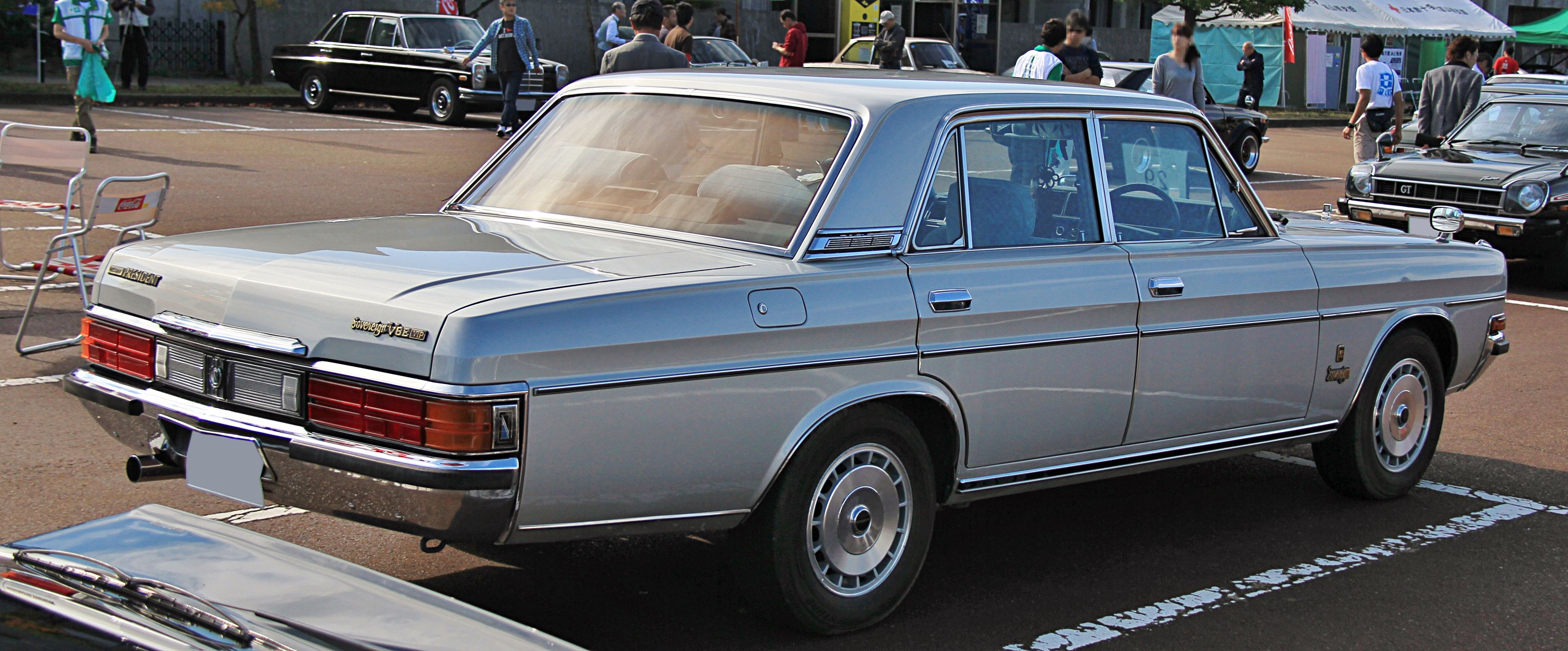
1985-1990 Nissan President Sovereign VIP series H250

== Third generation (1990–2002) ==
Nissan President
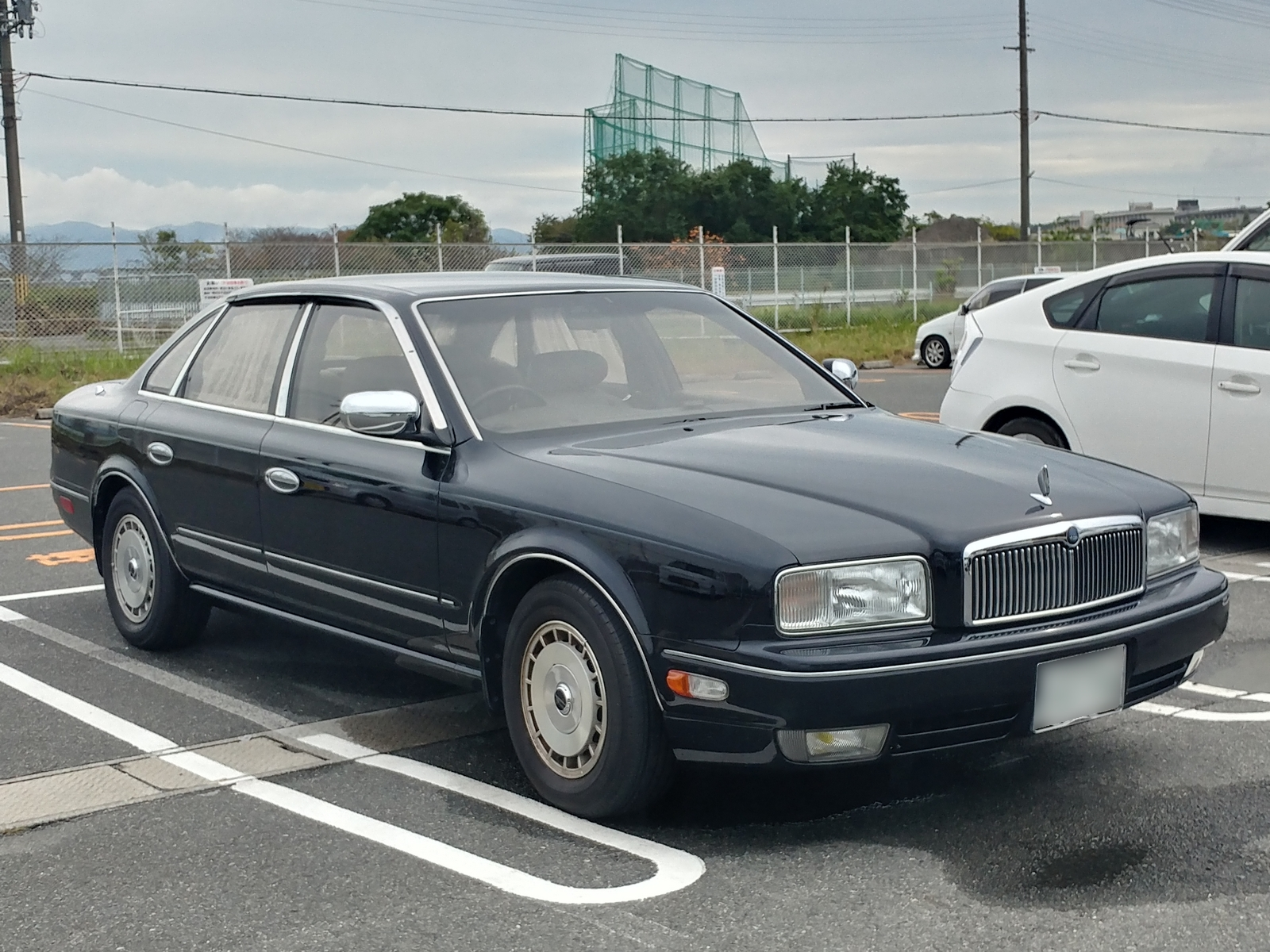
- Nissan President Type I

Overview
- Model code: HG50
- Production: 1990–2002

Body and chassis
- Related: Infiniti Q45 (G50)

Powertrain
- Engine: 4.5 L VH45DE V8
- Transmission: 4-speed automatic

Dimensions
- Wheelbase: JS (PHG50): 2,880 mm (113.4 in); 3,030 mm (119.3 in); Royal (JHG50): 3,530 mm (139.0 in)
- Length: JS: 5,075 mm (199.8 in); 5,225 mm (205.7 in); Royal: 5,725 mm (225.4 in)
- Width: 1,830 mm (72.0 in)
- Height: 1,425 mm (56.1 in)
- Curb weight: 1,960 kg (4,321 lb)

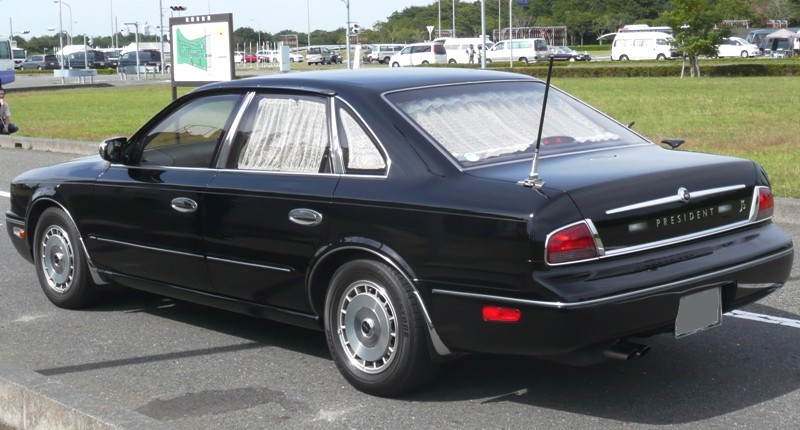
Nissan President HG50 rear view

In October 1989, the third-generation President, designated JHG50, debuted at the Tokyo Motor Show, with sales beginning a year later. Concurrently, a short-wheelbase version of the chassis PHG50 debuted in the United States as Infiniti Q45 or Nissan Infiniti Q45 in Japan, without a grille as a visual difference to the 1989 Lexus LS and the 1985 Acura Legend. As a result of Project 901, there was a renewed emphasis on positioning the President as a senior corporate luxury limousine with high levels of standard equipment, including Connolly Leather or a combined wool and silk blend upholstery. Extras included a diamond inlay on the key, gold plate hood ornament and rear badging, and ultrasound massage in the rear seats. Vehicles could be optionally equipped with Full-Active Suspension (JHG50 or PHG50) or conventional coil suspension (JG50 or PG50) while a multi-link suspension was used at all four wheels, similar to the Nissan Laurel (C33). This time the vehicle adopted many European styling cues, with its front now resembling the contemporary Jaguar XJ. Unlike the previous, hand-made generations, this was the first President built on an assembly line.

The new hood ornament was a stylized military headdress for ceremonial duties, called a feather bonnet or a busby.

Innovative technological features included a world-first feature that debuted in 1993: SRS airbag for the left-hand side (curbside) rear seat passenger. Both the President and the Q45 shared the new 4.5-litre VH45DE V8 engine, although the President's engine was tuned down by ten horsepower to 270 PS (199 kW) to avoid a too-sporting sound. In 1993, a short-wheelbase version similar to the Q45 joined the lineup, badged as President JS positioned for personal ownership, and marketed as an alternative to the Cima, Cedric and Gloria. The President JS and the Nissan Infiniti Q45, exclusive to Nissan Prince Store locations, discontinued in October 1997.

Nissan's special vehicles subsidiary Autech developed a Royal Limousine model with a split passenger compartment for 1993. The Royal was created as a possible replacement for the four 1966 Nissan Prince Royals used by the Imperial Household Agency for the Coronation Ceremony, or Shukuga Onretsu no Gi of Akihito 12 November 1990, but were not accepted.

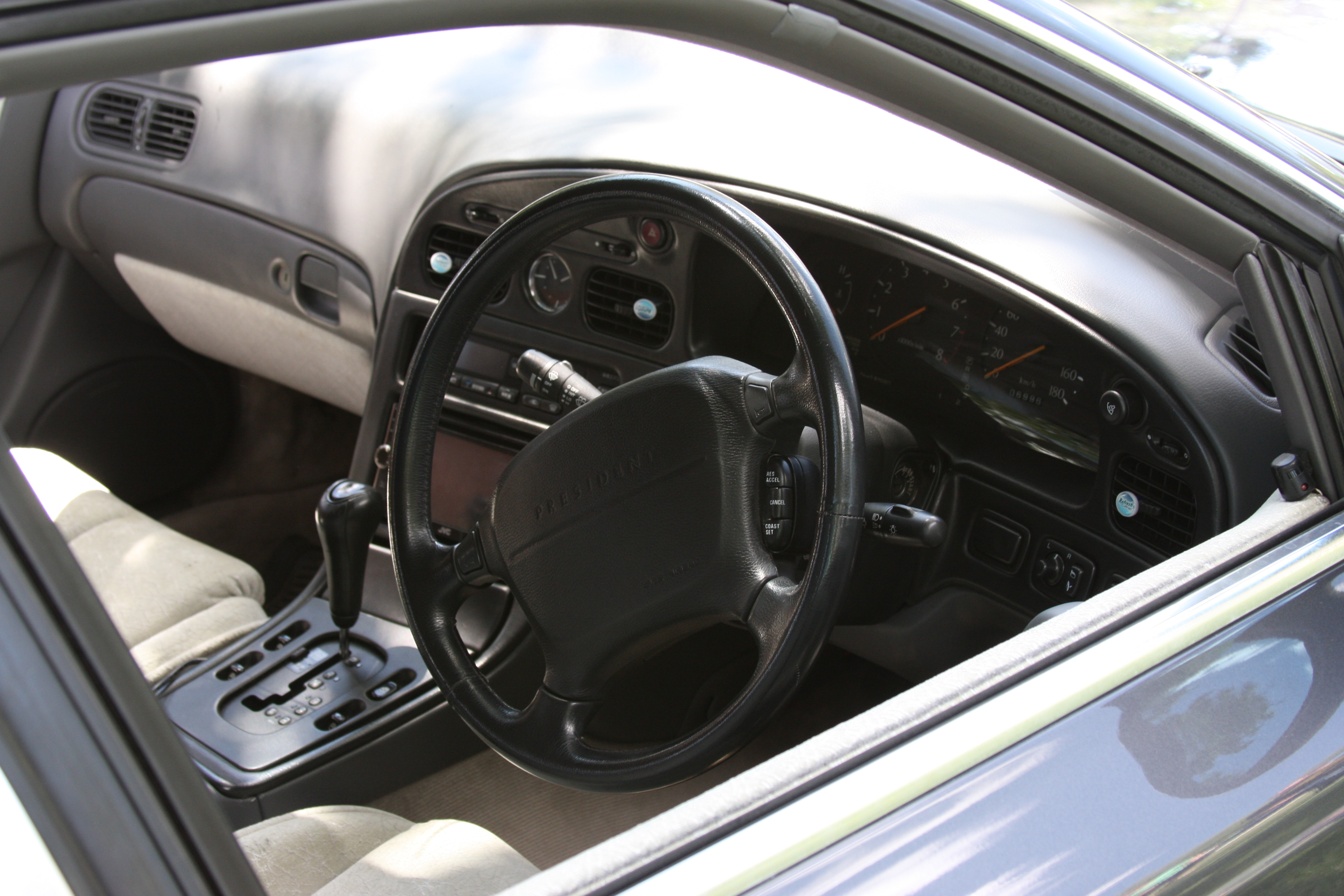
Nissan President interior (Japan)

In 1994, along with a minor facelift, Nissan revived the Sovereign trim level (previously available for 250 Presidents) for the long-wheelbase model. Another minor facelift occurred in 1998 (designated PHG50). At the same time, the previous Infiniti Q45 was replaced by a model that didn't share a joint appearance. It was now called the Nissan Cima and was also fitted with Japan's rear passenger airbag option. The PHG50 continued production until 2002 when the new F50 chassis was introduced. The combination wool-silk blend upholstery was replaced with a jacquard moquette upholstery.

In 1996, Autech introduced the "Relax Seat" feature and no longer offered the rear passenger airbag, replacing it with a side curtain airbag for both sides of the vehicle. Relax Seat allowed the front passenger seat to fold flat and slide forward, giving the rear passenger more legroom and the ability to extend and recline the seat.

The model year 1999 introduced a revised front grille, integrated fog lights, xenon headlights, and an upgrade to the audio-visual system, which also introduced a navigational system called Compass Link. A monitor for the rear passengers was integrated into the audio-visual system, which was added on top of the rear edge of the front seat center console and concealed behind a flip-down door.

== Fourth generation (2003–2010) ==
Nissan President
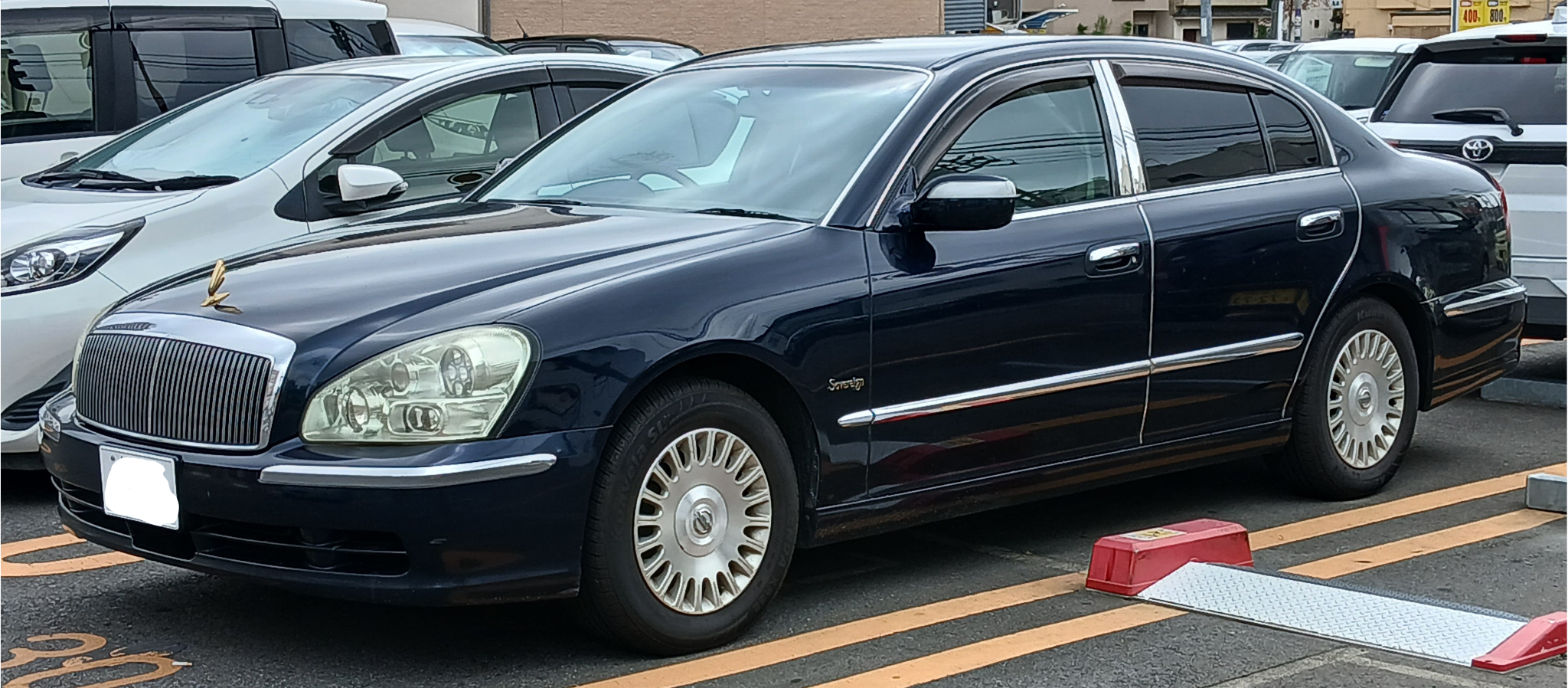

Overview
- Model code: PGF50
- Production: 2003–2010

Body and chassis
- Platform: Nissan LL platform
- Related: Nissan Cima; Infiniti Q45 (F50)

Powertrain
- Engine: 4.5 L VK45DE V8
- Transmission: 5-speed automatic

Dimensions
- Wheelbase: 2,870 mm (113.0 in)
- Length: 5,060 mm (199.2 in)
- Width: 1,845 mm (72.6 in)
- Height: 1,500 mm (59.1 in)
- Curb weight: 1,890 kg (4,167 lb)

The fourth generation was introduced in October 2003, based on the F50 Nissan Cima which had debuted in 2001, being also powered by the same 4.5-litre VK45DE V8 engine. It retained its top position as the flagship limousine at the reorganized Japanese Nissan dealerships called Nissan Blue Stage. Two versions were available, both badged Sovereign, with either five-passenger or four-passenger seating configuration. The front suspension was changed to MacPherson struts for the front while the multi-link rear suspension remained. This model remained Nissan's traditional competitor to the Toyota limousines the Toyota Century and Toyota Celsior, and it competed for customers for three years with the all-new Mitsubishi Dignity as the top level flagship, however Mitsubishi chose to use front wheel drive.

The hood ornament continued from the previous generation, and was a stylized military headdress for ceremonial duties, called a feather bonnet or a busby. In 2009, the hood ornament was changed from a raised type to an embedded type.

The available trim packages were called "Sovereign Five Seat" and "Sovereign Four Seat", and the four-seat package added an additional four-passenger version, called "Rear Seat VIP" that added lavish equipment; the "Relax Seat" feature continued. Some of the features were a rear seat monitor that would fold down from the ceiling with video input in the armrest, a rear seat DVD player, a Bose 8-speaker sound system, and the ability to extend and recline the rear seat opposite the driver with in integrated ultrasonic massage and heat feature.

This generation shared the wheelbase length with the Nissan Cima (F50), but the rear seat luxury features were only available on the President. The extended wheelbase Royal was no longer offered.

The President earned a ULEV emissions certification in April 2005, and the Compass Link navigation system was upgraded to CarWings February 2008.

=== Production ending announcement ===
In August 2010, Nissan announced that it had stopped the production of both the Nissan Cima and President, which share the same chassis. The two models needed safety upgrades to comply with the latest safety regulations, but lackluster sales showed that the company would not be able to recoup costs. As there was no platform successor to Cima/President, the Nissan Fuga became the flagship for Nissan, and ended the availability of a V8 engine for JDM luxury sedans, while the V8 continued overseas. Starting in 2012, the Cima name was revived as a stretched Fuga, resuming the market segment formerly held by the President, thereby continuing to offer an alternative to the modern Toyota Crown Majesta premium level limousine made in Japan. The President was also indirectly affected by the Nissan Revival Plan due to its exclusivity and niche market positioning for Japanese senior level executives.

Since its debut in 1965, 56,000 units of the Nissan President were sold. After only 63 units were sold in fiscal year 2009, production was ended.

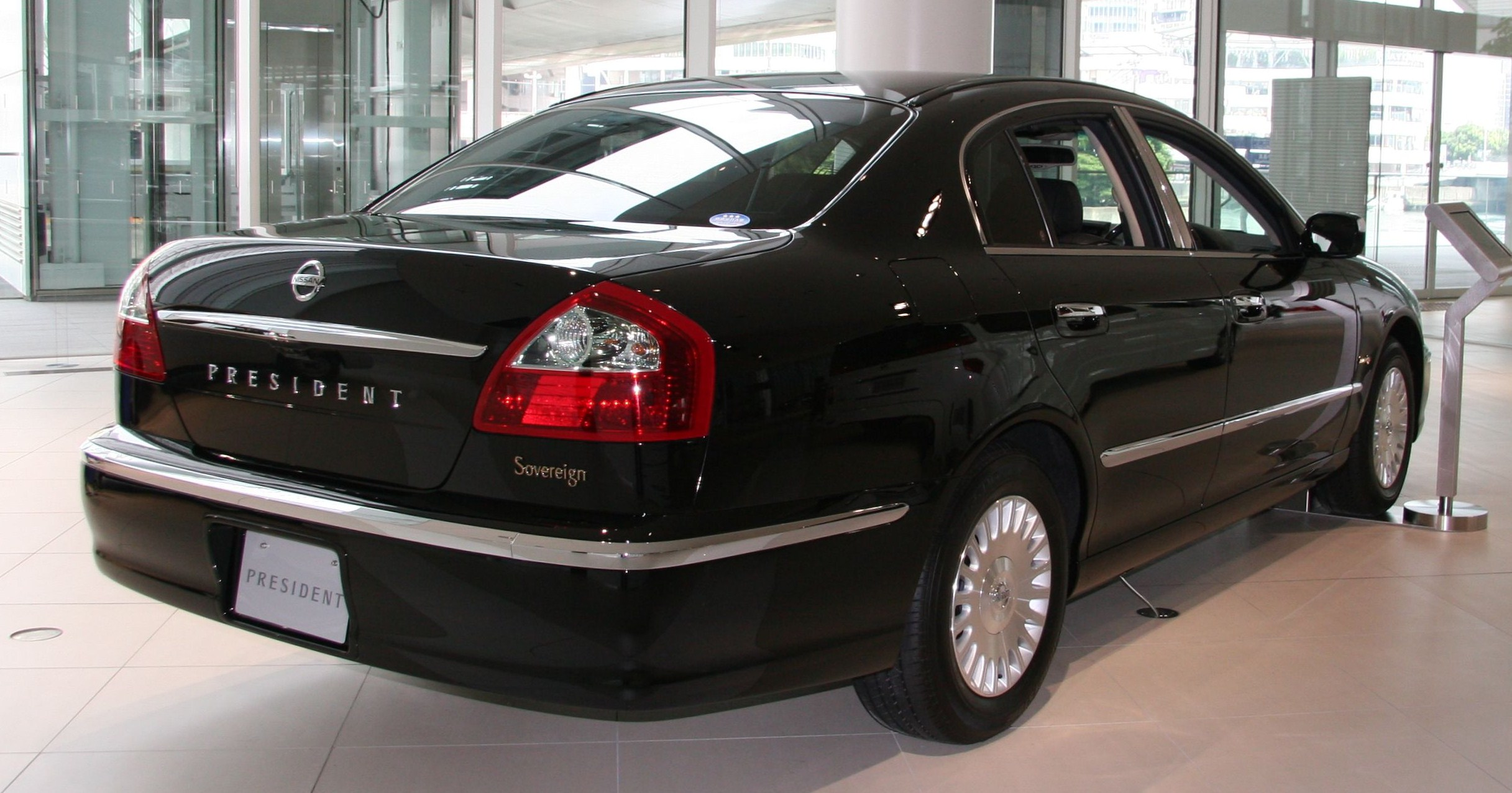
2009 Nissan President (Japan)

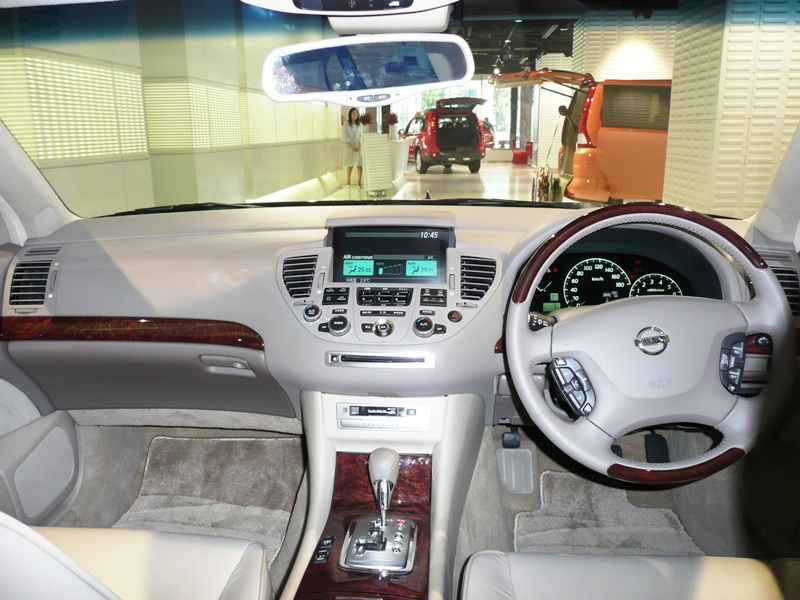
2003–2007 Nissan President interior

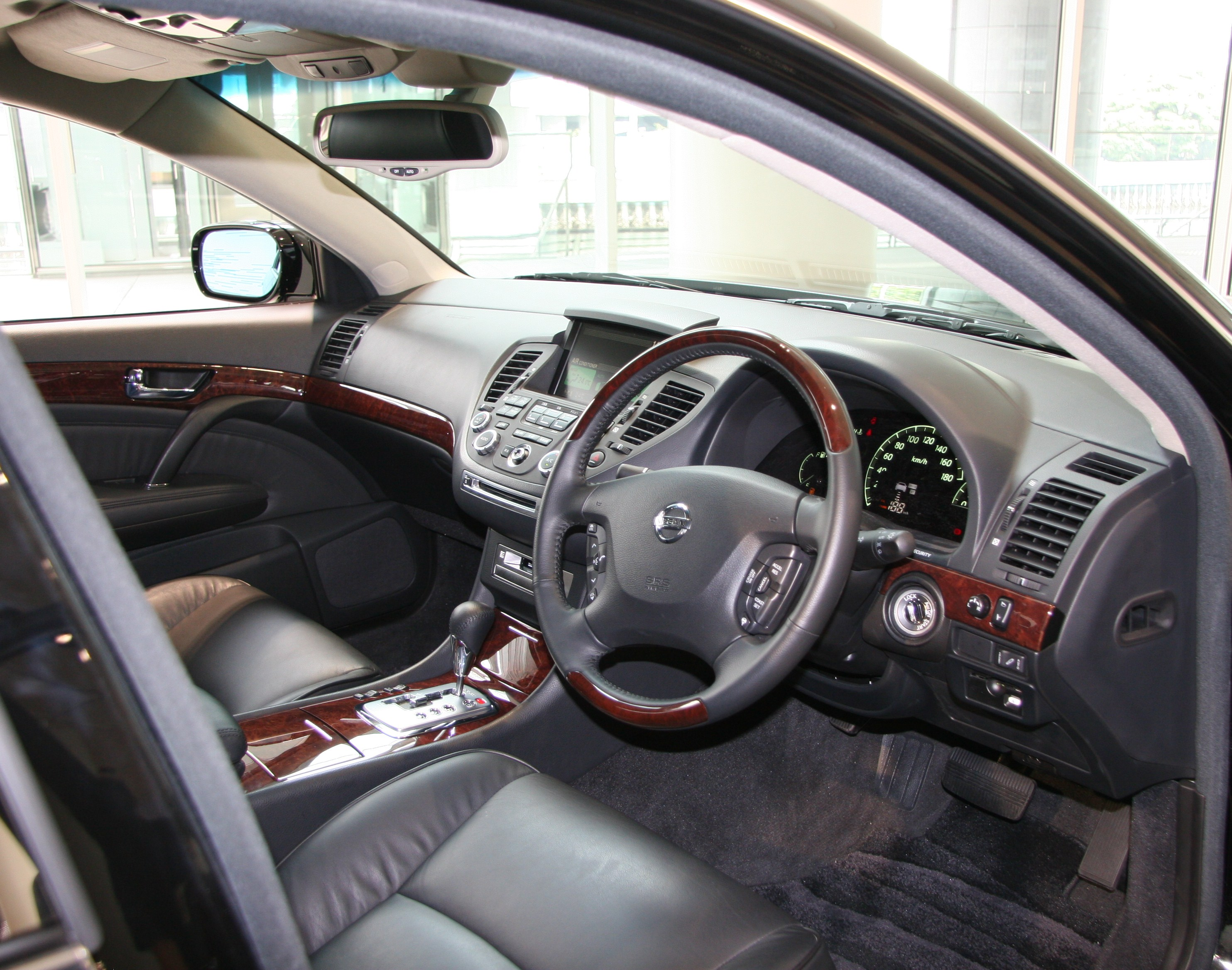
2008 Nissan President interior
