= W64 =

W64 may refer to:

- W64 (nuclear warhead)
- Nissan W64 engine
- Teshio-Nakagawa Station, in Hokkaido, Japan
- W64, a WAV audio format
