= Nissan W64 engine =

Nissan W64
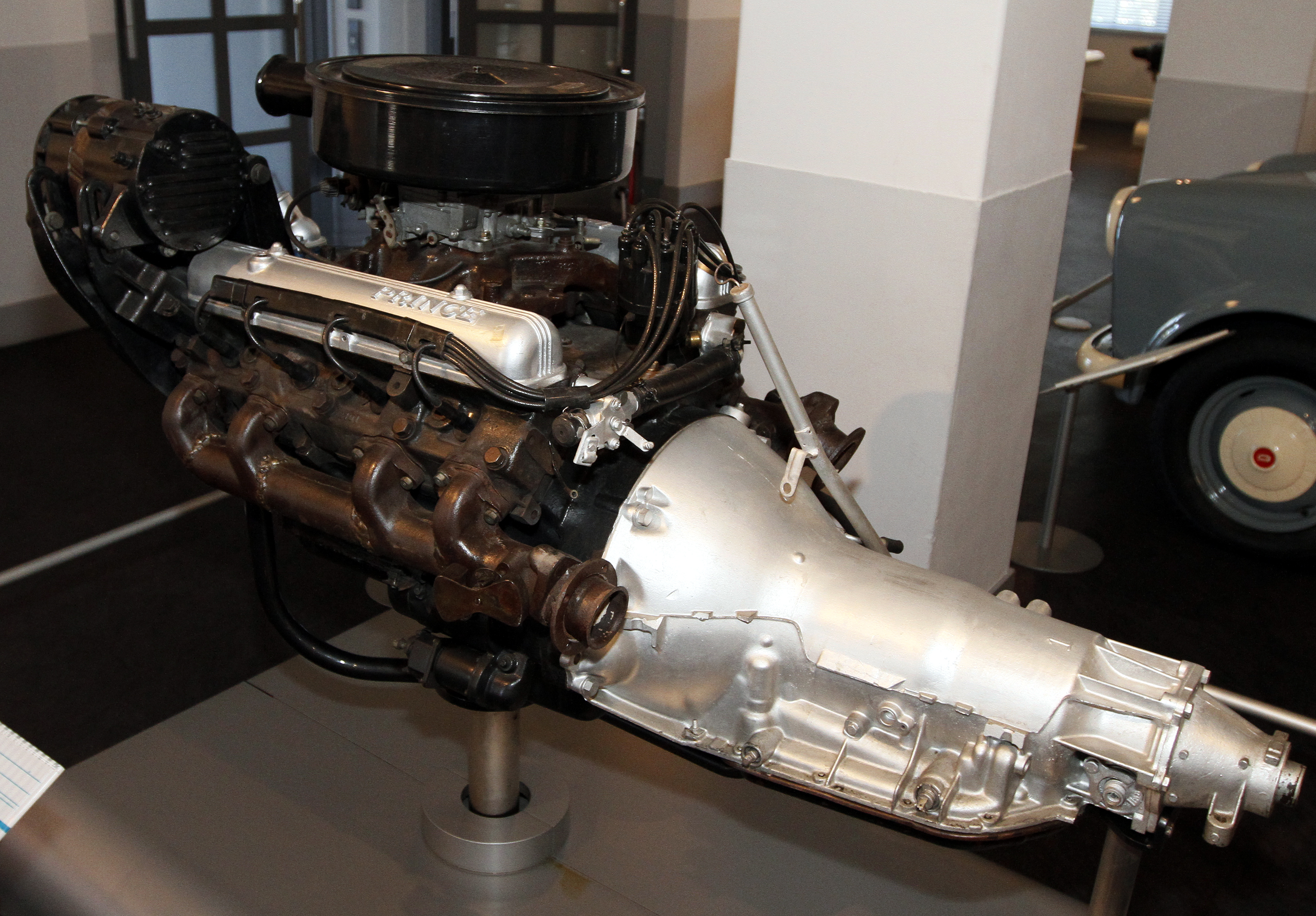

Overview
- Manufacturer: Prince & Nissan
- Production: 1966-1967

Layout
- Configuration: 90° V8
- Displacement: 6,373 cc (6.4 L)
- Cylinder bore: 105 mm (4.13 in)
- Piston stroke: 92 mm (3.6 in)
- Valvetrain: OHV

Combustion
- Fuel type: Gasoline
- Oil system: Wet sump

Output
- Power output: 260 PS (191 kW; 256 hp)

The W64 is a 6.4L V8 piston engine from Nissan. It was originally developed by the Prince Motor Company for use in the Prince Royal limousine, a limousine made for the Imperial Household of Japan.

== History ==
Limited production, only 8 known units built.

== Specifications ==
- Aspiration: Naturally aspirated
- Valvetrain: OHV
- Displacement: 6,373 cc (6.4 L)
- Power: 260 PS (191 kW; 256 hp)

== See also ==
- List of Nissan engines
- Nissan Prince Royal
- Nissan Y engine
- Nissan
- Prince Motor Company
