= Naganori Ito =

Naganori Ito 伊藤 修令
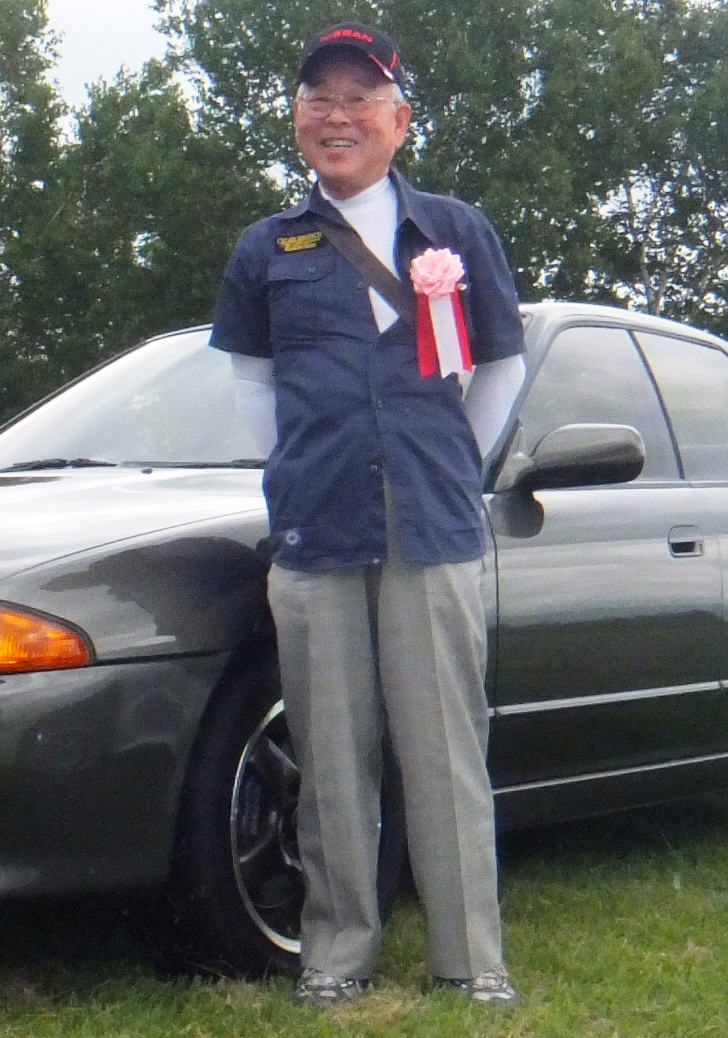
- Naganori Ito at the Prince & Skyline Museum in Okaya, Nagano on Sept. 1, 2013.
- Born: 7 March 1937 (age 89); Takehara, Hiroshima Prefecture
- Education: Hiroshima University
- Engineering career
- Discipline: Mechanical engineering
- Projects: Nissan Skyline (R32)

Naganori Ito (伊藤 修令, Itō Naganori; born 1937) is a Japanese automotive engineer, and was responsible for the development of the eighth generation R32 Nissan Skyline including the BNR32 Skyline GT-R.

== History ==
=== Early years ===
Ito was born in Takehara, Hiroshima Prefecture on March 7, 1937 as a son of a rice store owner. He graduated from Hiroshima University in March 1959 and joined Fuji Precision Industries (later Prince Motor Company). In April 1959, he was assigned to the development of the chassis of the first and the second generation Skylines ALSI and S50. After the merger of Prince and Nissan, he was involved in the development of Skyline series, Laurel and Leopard F30. After January 1982, he became the chief engineer of Nissan Prairie (M10) and Nissan March (Micra) K10.

=== Appointed the Skyline chief engineer ===
In 1984, Shinichiro Sakurai, Ito’s longtime “teacher” since he joined Fuji Precision/Prince, became ill and had to stay at the hospital for a while. Sakurai’s “No. 1 student” Ito was suddenly assigned to complete the design of the seventh generation R31 Skyline which Sakurai was responsible for. But the only thing Ito did about the R31 was preparing and submitting the model registration documents to the Ministry of Land, Infrastructure, Transport and Tourism.

In August 1985, the new R31 Skyline (so-called the “7th Skyline” in Japan) debuted, but it got a bad reputation from longtime Skyline users, the Skyline maniacs, and car critics in Japan. He made up his mind to overcome such disgrace. He became the leader of the development team of the next generation Skyline (R32) from the beginning.

=== R32 Skyline and revival of GT-R ===
In May 1989, the eighth generation R32 Skyline was released. Then, in August 1989, the BNR32 Skyline GT-R was finally launched. The GT-R nameplate was revived sixteen years after the KPGC110 Skyline GT-R disappeared from history. Ito earned his reputation from this.

=== Current years ===
After the debut of the R32 Skyline, he was appointed the executive director of Autech (Nissan’s subsidiary) and later the technical advisor of NISMO. He is currently serving as adviser to Autech and the honorary director of the Prince & Skyline Museum in Okaya, Nagano Prefecture. His former younger colleague Kozo Watanabe (chief engineer of the R33 and the R34 Skylines) is the advisor to the Museum.

== Quotes ==
- During my Prince years, I learned what the Prince Motors spirit is from many people. Especially from Mr. Jiro Tanaka, who supervised the Prince Engineering Department, and from Mr. Shinichiro Sakurai, who was my direct boss.
- Sakurai-san was examining me if I could overcome any kinds of difficulties he assigns. I heard that a lion parent kicks the children down into the abyss of a ravine, and brings up the kids who can climb up. The “Sakurai School” was just like a “Lion School”.

== See also ==
- Prince
- Nissan
- Nissan Skyline
- Nissan Skyline GT-R
- Nissan March (Micra) K10
- Nissan Prairie (M10)
- Nissan Laurel (C32)
- Jiro Tanaka
- Shinichiro Sakurai
- Kozo Watanabe
- Autech
- NISMO
