= Jiro Tanaka =

Japanese engineer (1917–2017)

- 田中 次郎
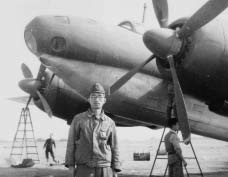
- Tanaka in front of the Tachikawa Ki-74 after World War II
- Born: 16 January 1917; Shibuya, Tokyo, Japan
- Died: 2017 (aged 100)
- Education: Tokyo Institute of Technology
- Engineering career
- Discipline: Mechanical engineering
- Projects: Various Prince vehicles and Nissan vehicles
- Significant design: Tachikawa Ki-74
- Awards: Japan Automotive Hall of Fame (2008)

Jiro Tanaka (田中 次郎, Tanaka Jirō; 16 January 1917 – 2017) was a Japanese aircraft and automotive engineer.

== Career ==
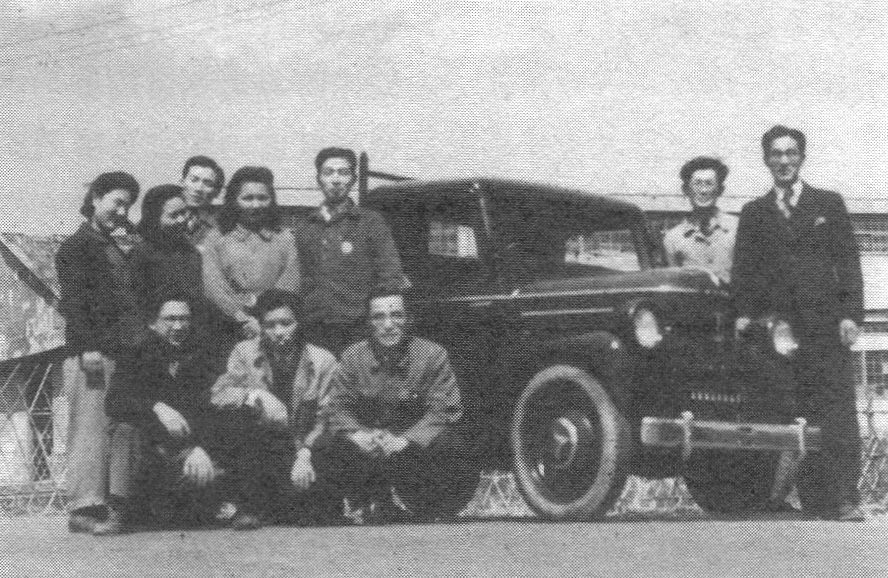
Tanaka (rightmost squatting), Takuya Himura (second from right behind the car) and all the design department employees of Tokyo Electric Car Company with their first vehicle Tama EOT-47 electric truck in 1947.

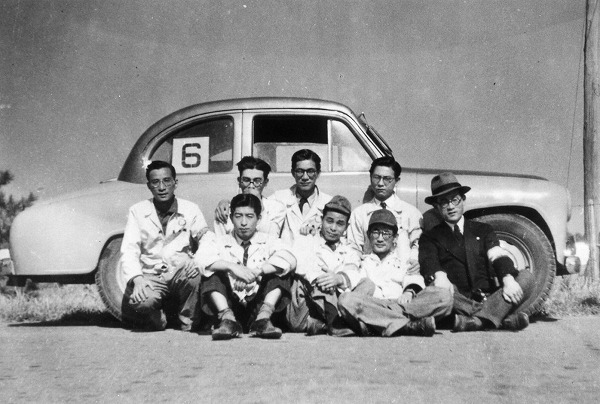
Tanaka (leftmost) and his boss Tamotsu Toyama (rightmost wearing hat), former Prototype Aircraft Workshop manager of the Tachikawa Aircraft Company, in front of the Tama Senior EMS-48 electric vehicle at the 2nd Electric Vehicle Performance Contest in Odawara held by the Ministry of Commerce and Industry on 17 October 1948.

Tanaka graduated from the Tokyo Institute of Technology in March 1939 and joined the Tachikawa Aircraft Company in April 1939. In October of the same year, he enlisted in the Army and evaluated new engines for army aircraft. In 1944, the Japanese Army sent him to his home company of Tachikawa to complete the design of the Tachikawa Ki-74. Tanaka's contribution was to add a pressurized cabin to Ki-74.

After the end of World War II, Tanaka repaired existing Tachikawa Ki-77 and Ki-74 aircraft for submission to the GHQ. On 30 June 1947, Tanaka joined the Tokyo Electric Car Company after it became independent from the Tachikawa Aircraft; it later changed its name to "Tama Electric Car Company" on 30 November 1949.

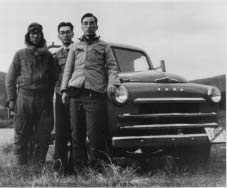
Tanaka (right) and his Tama colleagues testing the prototype of their first gasoline-engine vehicle Tama (Prince) Truck AFTF in Hakone, late 1951 or early 1952. This car had not been named "Prince" yet.

After the Korean War broke out, the price of batteries rose significantly, while the price of gasoline fell. For this reason, Tama Electric Car started building gasoline-engine vehicles. As the company was essentially still an aircraft body manufacturer, they had to acquire automobile engines from outside. They bought engines from Fuji Precision Industries (one of the successors of the disbanded Nakajima Aircraft Company). Tama Electric Car changed its name to "Tama Motor Company" on November 26, 1951. In 1952, a new sedan was launched that was named "Prince," so on November 27, 1952, the company again changed its name, this time to the "Prince Motor Company."

Tanaka, as Design Department Manager, supervised the development of all Prince vehicles such as the Skyline, Gloria, and others under the supervision of his boss Ryoichi Nakagawa, a former Nakajima Aircraft engineer. Tanaka was promoted to executive director after Prince Motor Company mergered with Nissan. He retired from Nissan in 1983, and was appointed the Vice President of Nissan Diesel. In 1985, Tanaka retired from Nissan Diesel but remained an adviser to the company. He was inducted into the Japan Automotive Hall of Fame in 2008 along with Yutaka Katayama, also known as "Mr. K".

== Death ==
Jiro Tanaka died in 2017, at the age of 100.

== See also ==
- Tachikawa Aircraft Company
- Tachikawa Ki-74
- Tachikawa Ki-77
- Prince
- Ryoichi Nakagawa
- Shinichiro Sakurai
- Naganori Ito
- Nissan
- Nissan Diesel

== Sources ==
- The History and the Biography of Jiro Tanaka (Detailed PDF document attached) (Japanese) - Japan Automotive Hall of Fame
- From the Ki-74 to the Tama Electric Vehicles and the Prince Vehicles - Interview of Jiro Tanaka on Nov. 22, 1996 (Japanese) - The Society of Automotive Engineers of Japan (JSAE)
- Carmakers owe success to warplanes - Military's brightest aircraft designers created Japan's automotive powers The Japan Times, Aug. 13, 2005
