= Nissan NAPS =

Emission control system

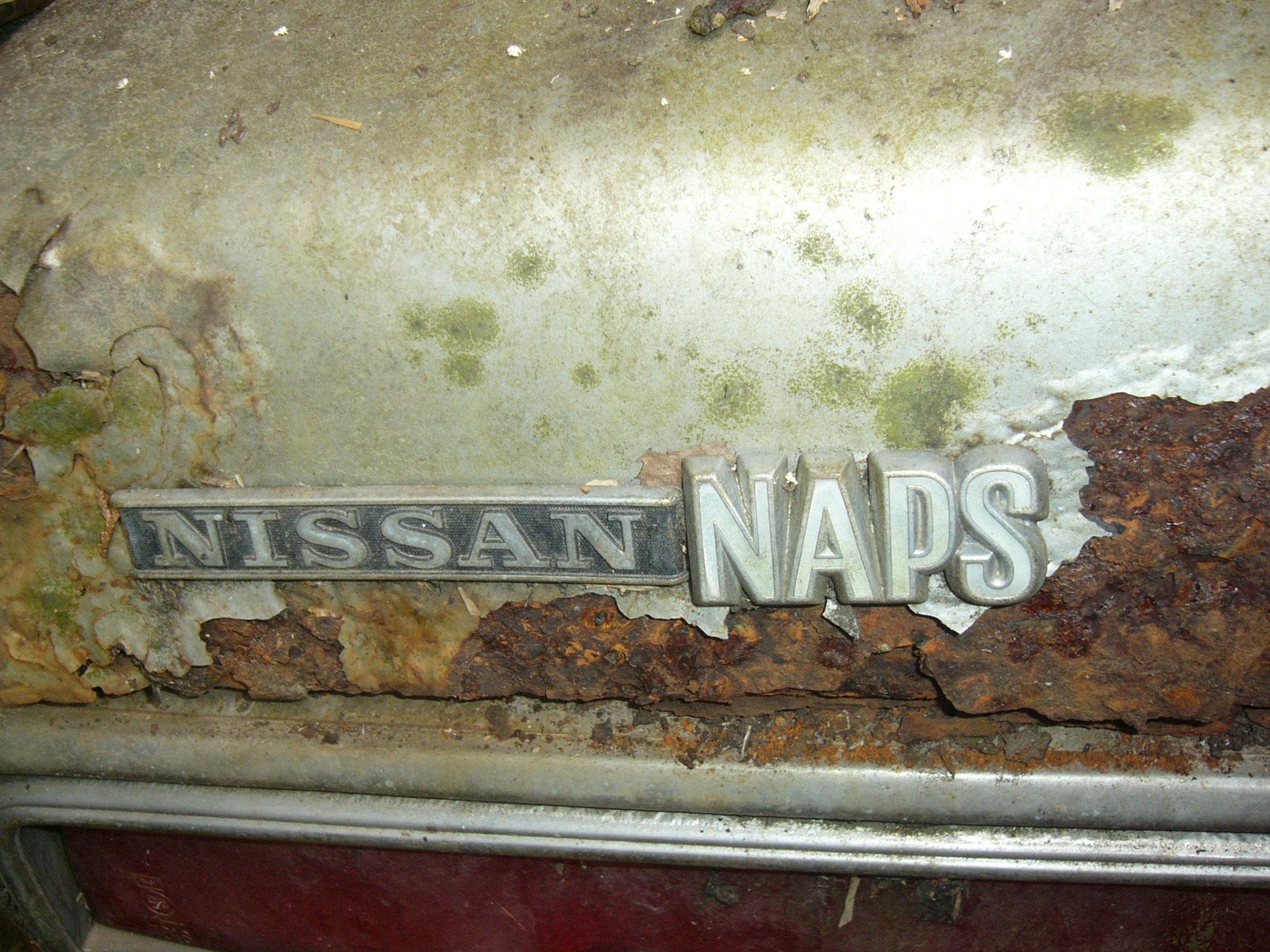
Nissan NAPS badge from Nissan Violet 1600GL (A10)

NAPS (Nissan Anti Pollution System) is a moniker used in Japan to identify vehicles built with emission control technology. The technology was installed so that their vehicles would be in compliance with Japanese Government emission regulations passed in 1968. The term was first introduced in Japan, with an externally mounted badge on the trunk of vehicles equipped. Nissan's implementation began with the Y44E V8 engine installed in the Nissan President along with all vehicles installed with the Nissan L engine and the Nissan A engine in 1975. The initial introduction of Nissan's technology was the installation of an exhaust gas recirculation valve, followed with the addition of a catalytic converter and an air pump that added oxygen into the exhaust to promote higher temperatures in the catalytic converter, thus cleaning the exhaust further.

The NAPS-Z technology, introduced in 1978, was developed with assistance from Hitachi. It uses a novel implementation of two spark plugs per cylinder, called dual ignition together with electronically controlled fuel injection, installed on the Nissan Z engine. This terminology is often confused with the engine installed in the Nissan 280Z, which used the "L" engine. However, the NAPS technology was installed in the Fairlady/Z and sold internationally.

Another version of the twin spark plug method was introduced on the Nissan Stanza with the CA engine, called NAPS-X, which eventually replaced the NAPS-Z approach. The CA engine implemented a hemispherical cylinder head, an approach used by several auto makers.
