= Nissan Prince Royal =

Nissan Prince Royal series A70
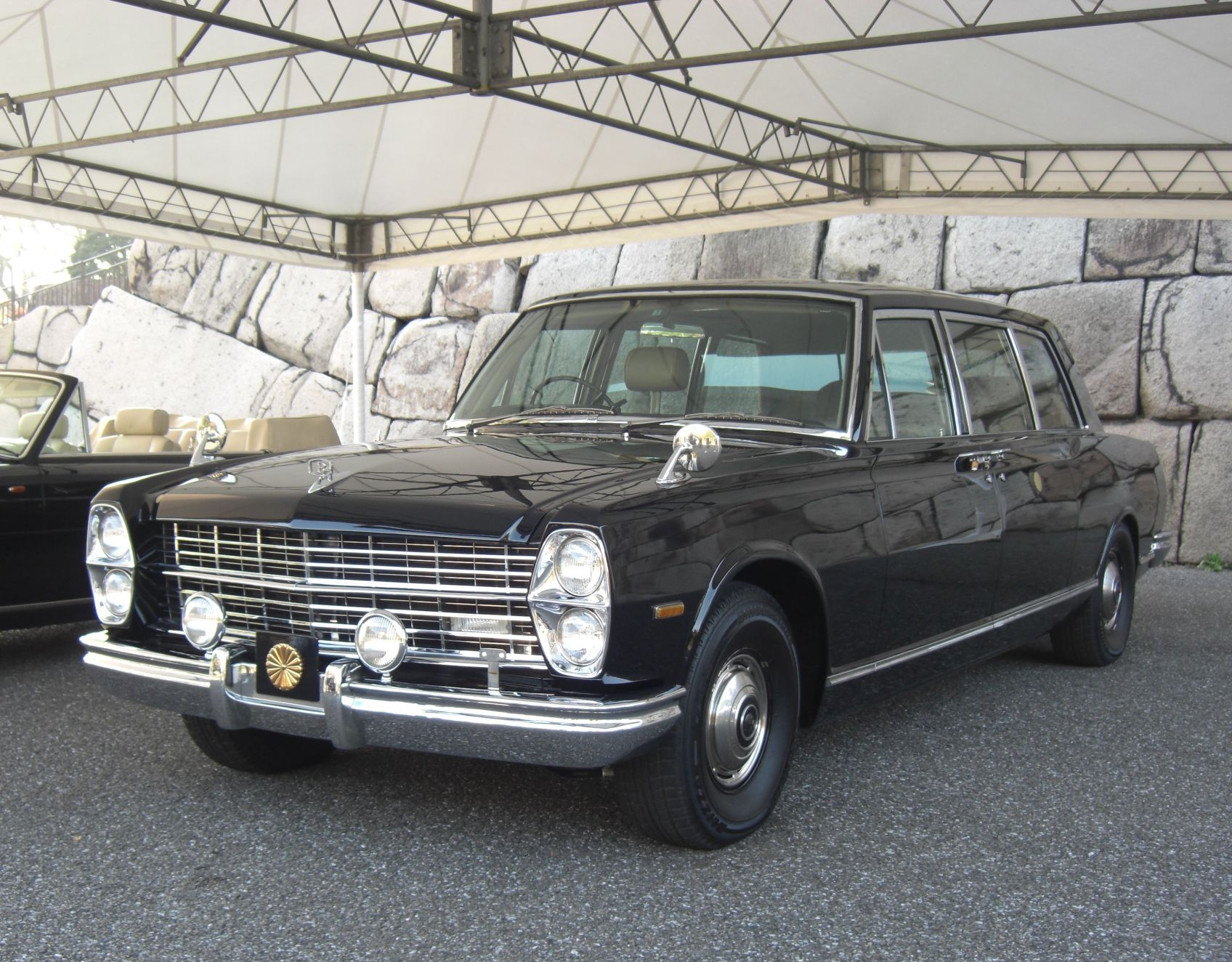

Overview
- Manufacturer: Prince; Nissan
- Production: 1966–1967; 5 produced
- Assembly: Japan: Musashimurayama
- Designer: Norihiko Mori

Body and chassis
- Body style: 4-door limousine 1 hearse
- Layout: FR layout
- Related: Nissan (Prince) Gloria A30

Powertrain
- Engine: 6.4 litres (391 cu in) W64 V8
- Transmission: 3-speed Turbo-Hydramatic TH400 automatic

Dimensions
- Wheelbase: 3,880 mm (152.8 in)
- Length: 6,155 mm (242.3 in)
- Width: 2,100 mm (82.7 in)
- Height: 1,770 mm (69.7 in)
- Curb weight: 7,055 lb (3,200 kg)

The Nissan Prince Royal is a large Japanese limousine made for the Imperial Household of Japan.

== History ==
The Japanese auto industry was expanding rapidly in the early 1960s, and the Imperial Household Agency sought a Japanese auto manufacturer to produce a suitable car for the Emperor of Japan. In September 1965, the Prince Motor Company announced that they would be providing two vehicles for the Emperor. The first would be ready by 1966, the other by 1967. In May 1966, Prince Motor Co. merged with Nissan Motor Co., and so Nissan was added to the name of the car. The Prince Motor Company had an established relationship with the Imperial Household Agency previously, when they presented the first Prince Gloria to Crown Prince Akihito as a first-anniversary wedding gift, and an earlier gift to the Crown Prince called the Prince Sedan in 1954. The Prince Royal was the third Japanese built post-war vehicle to use a V8 engine; the first was the Toyota Crown Eight in 1964, and the second was the Nissan President in 1965.

Because of the massive weight at 3,200 kg (7,054 lb), a 6,437 cc (391 ci) Prince series W64 V8 with overhead valves, producing 260 PS (191.2 kW; 256.4 bhp) was used along with custom 8.90-15 Bridgestone tyres. Front independent double wishbone coil suspension, with leaf springs in the rear. Drum brakes were used with power assist. A three-speed GM Super Turbine 400 (THM400) automatic transmission is used, with the gear selector installed on the steering column. An American built transmission was used for expediency, in that Japanese manufacturers had not yet developed a transmission capable of coping with the torque from the Prince built V8 engine.

When the Emperor is riding inside, the Imperial Standard is displayed on the top of the grille. An additional roundel, known as the Imperial Seal of Japan is also displayed at both the front and rear of the car in place of a license plate, and on the exterior of both rear passenger doors, displaying a 16 petal chrysanthemum, in golden colour, in reference to the Chrysanthemum Throne of Japan.

The vehicle has coach doors for the center-rear that open with a wider angle. Interior features a total of eight passenger seats. There are three rows of seats. The two center rear seats are folding type for security personnel. In between the center seats is a beverage bar. The rear seats were covered in supple 100% wool upholstery, while the driver has leather seats. The windows have curtains and double pane glass, allowing the passenger compartment to be pressurized for additional security protection. A telephone is used to communicate to the driver. When the Prince Royal was in service, additional government transportation used the Nissan President for various transportation needs.

The vehicles were retired on July 7, 2006, when the Toyota Century Royal was presented for service to replace them. Previous vehicles used to transport previous Emperors were a Rolls-Royce Phantom V used in the 1960s which replaced the Mercedes-Benz 770s that were used from the 1930s.

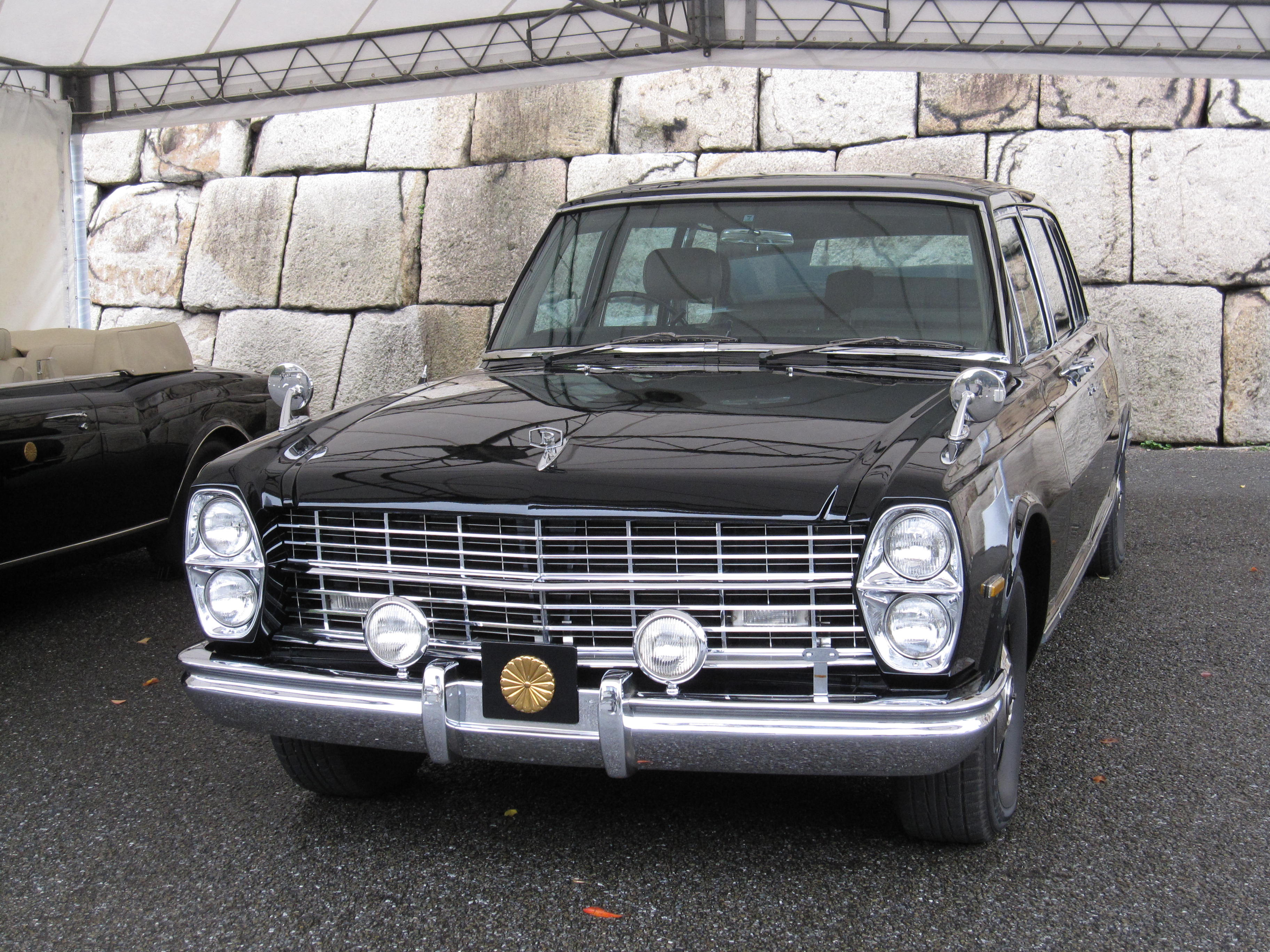

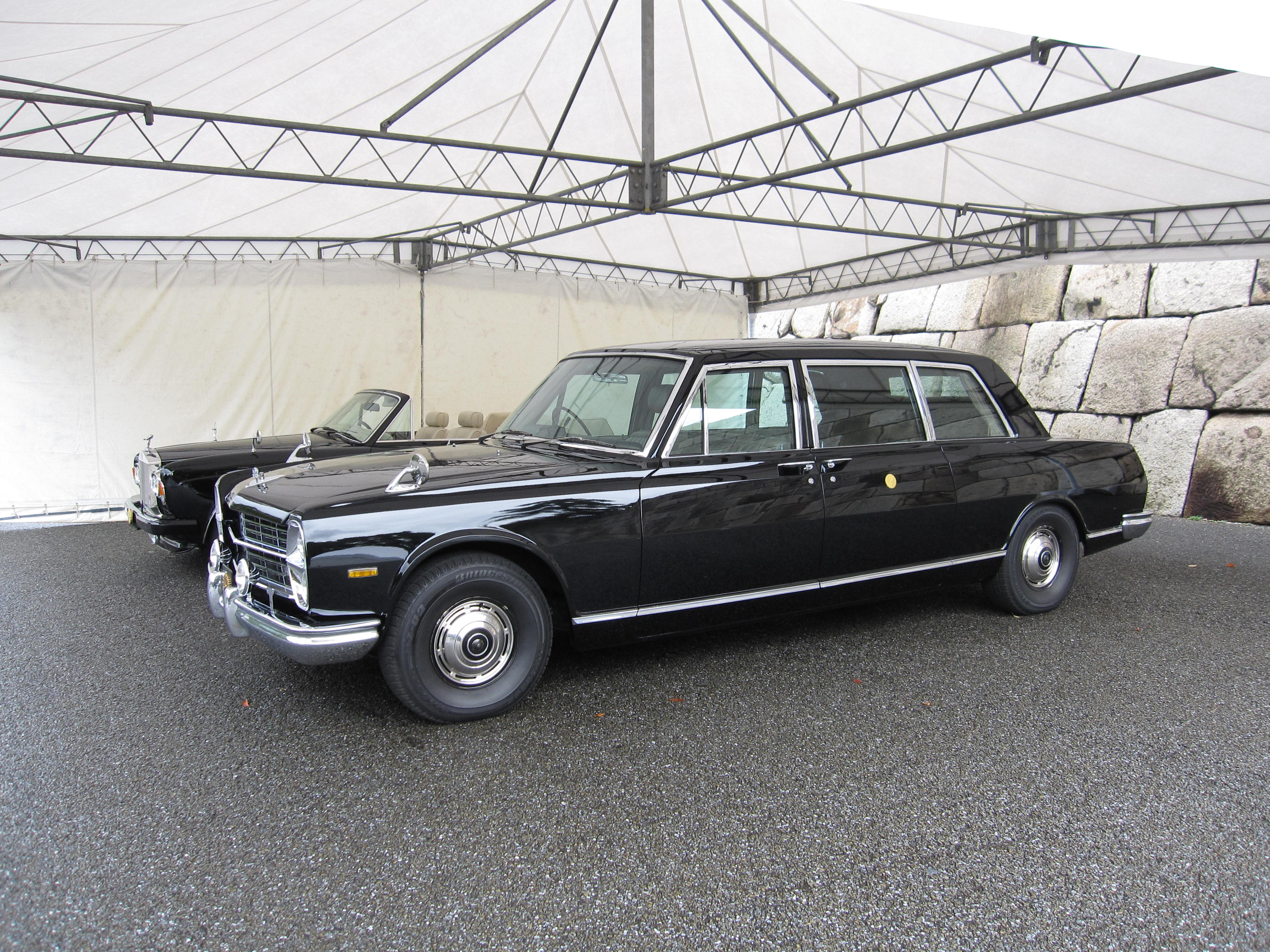

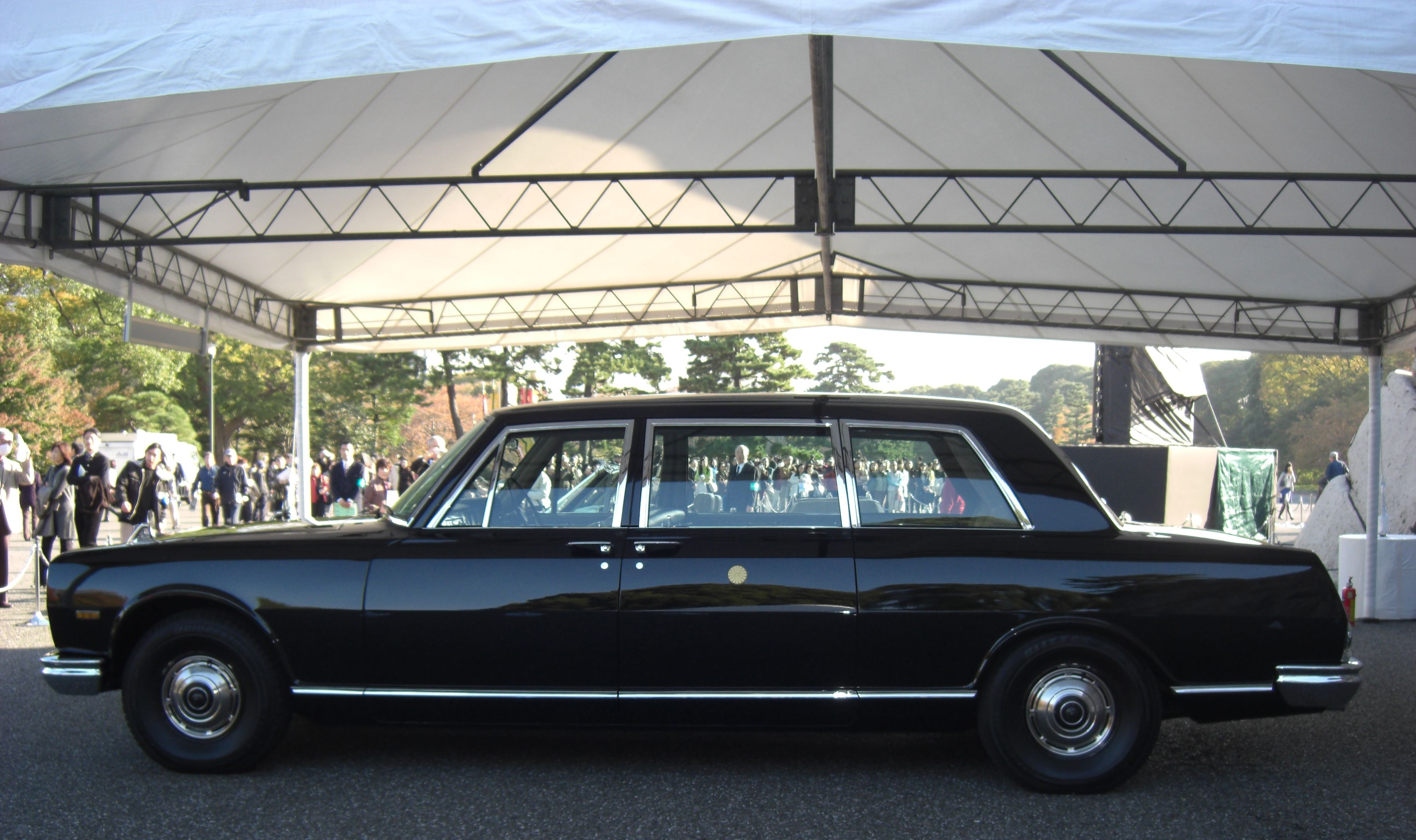

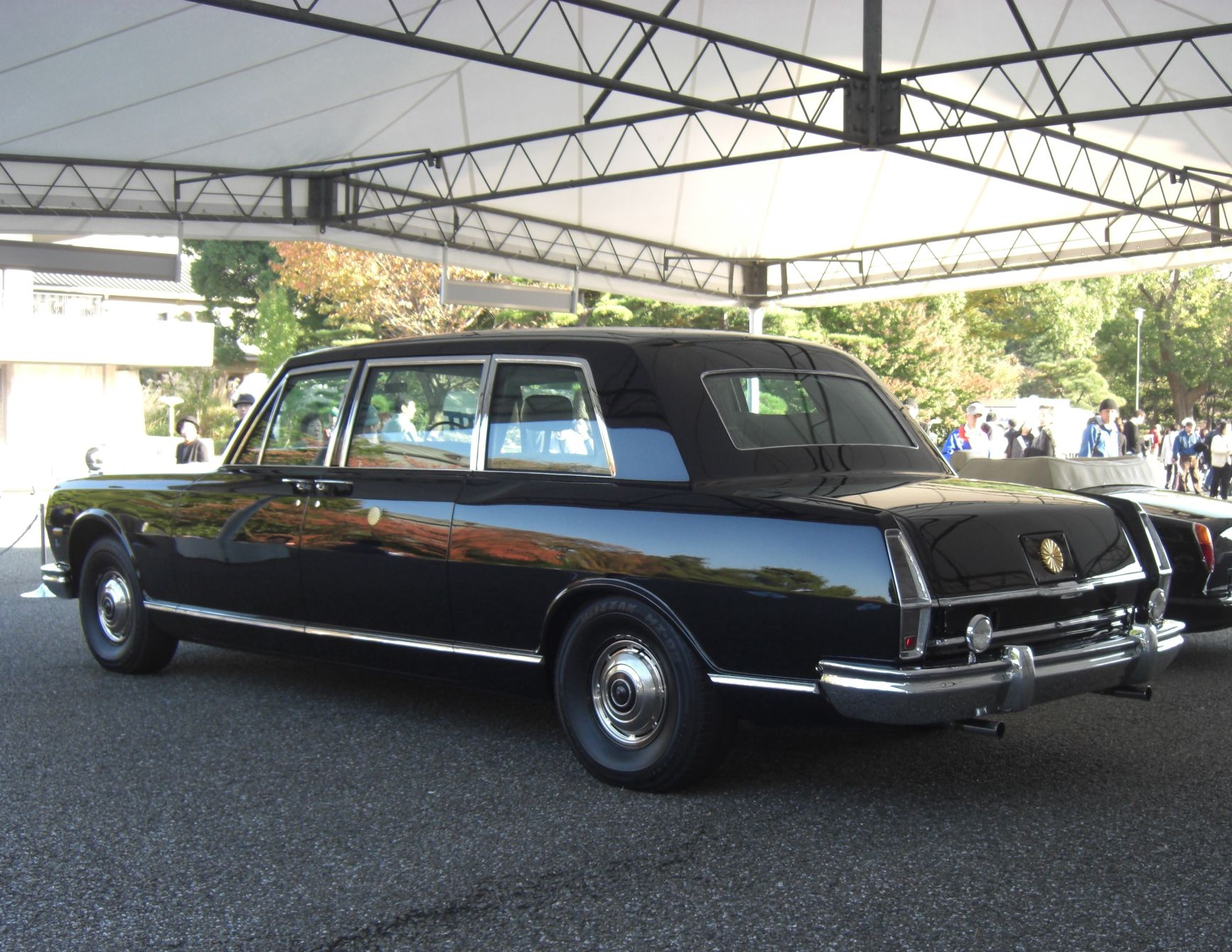

== See also ==
- Vehicles maintained by the Imperial Household Agency 新御料車について - 宮内庁管理部（平成18年7月12日）
- Image of a Nissan Prince Royal
- Official state car
