= Prince Motor Company =

Defunct Japanese automobile manufacturer

Prince Motors, Ltd.
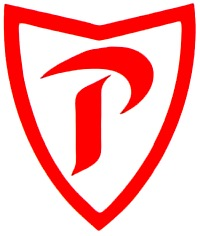
- Native name: プリンス自動車工業株式会社
- Romanized name: Prince Jidōsha Kōgyō Kabushiki-gaisha
- Company type: Public
- Industry: Automotive industry; Aerospace industry; Power loom
- Founded: June 30, 1947; 78 years ago (Foundation of the Tokyo Electric Car Company)
- Founder: Shojiro Ishibashi; Ryoichi Nakagawa; Jiro Tanaka; Shinichiro Sakurai
- Defunct: August 1, 1966
- Fate: Merged into Nissan
- Successor: Nissan
- Headquarters: Suginami, Tokyo, Japan
- Key people: Shojiro Ishibashi (chairman)
- Products: Automobile; Pencil Rocket (collaboration with Hideo Itokawa and Tokyo University); Power loom
- Subsidiaries: Rhythm Friend Manufacturing (current THK Rhythm)

The Prince Motor Company (Japanese: プリンス自動車工業株式会社) was an automobile marque from Japan which eventually merged into Nissan in 1966. It began as the Tachikawa Aircraft Company, a manufacturer of various airplanes for the Japanese Army in World War II, e.g., the Ki-36, Ki-55 and Ki-74. Tachikawa Aircraft Company was dissolved after the war and the company took the name Fuji Precision Industries. It diversified into automobiles, producing an electric car, the Tama, in 1946, named for the region the company originated in, Tama, using the Ohta series PC/PD platform. The company changed its name to Prince in 1952 to honor Akihito's formal investiture as Crown Prince of the nation. In 1954 they changed their name back to Fuji Precision Industries, and in 1961 changed the name back again to Prince Motor Company. In 1966, they became part of Nissan, while the Prince organization remained in existence inside Nissan, as Nissan Prince Store in Japan until Nissan consolidated the Prince dealership network into "Nissan Blue Stage" in 1999.

== Products ==
Prince had success building luxury automobiles. Among its most famous car lines were the Skyline and Gloria, both of which were absorbed into the Nissan range and continued after their 1966 merger; however, Prince also built the 15-passenger Homy which was eventually shared with the Nissan Caravan and the Nissan Laurel, a four-door sedan platform mate with the Skyline, on which Prince had begun development before the merger but was introduced after the merger in 1968. Prince had also begun development on a small car to compete with the Toyota Corolla and Nissan Sunny, but after the merger, the car was introduced as the Nissan Cherry using front wheel drive.

The former Nissan Gloria and the Nissan Skyline are known in the US as the Infiniti M (2003 - 2004), the Infiniti G (2003 - 2006), and the Infiniti Q50 (2013+).

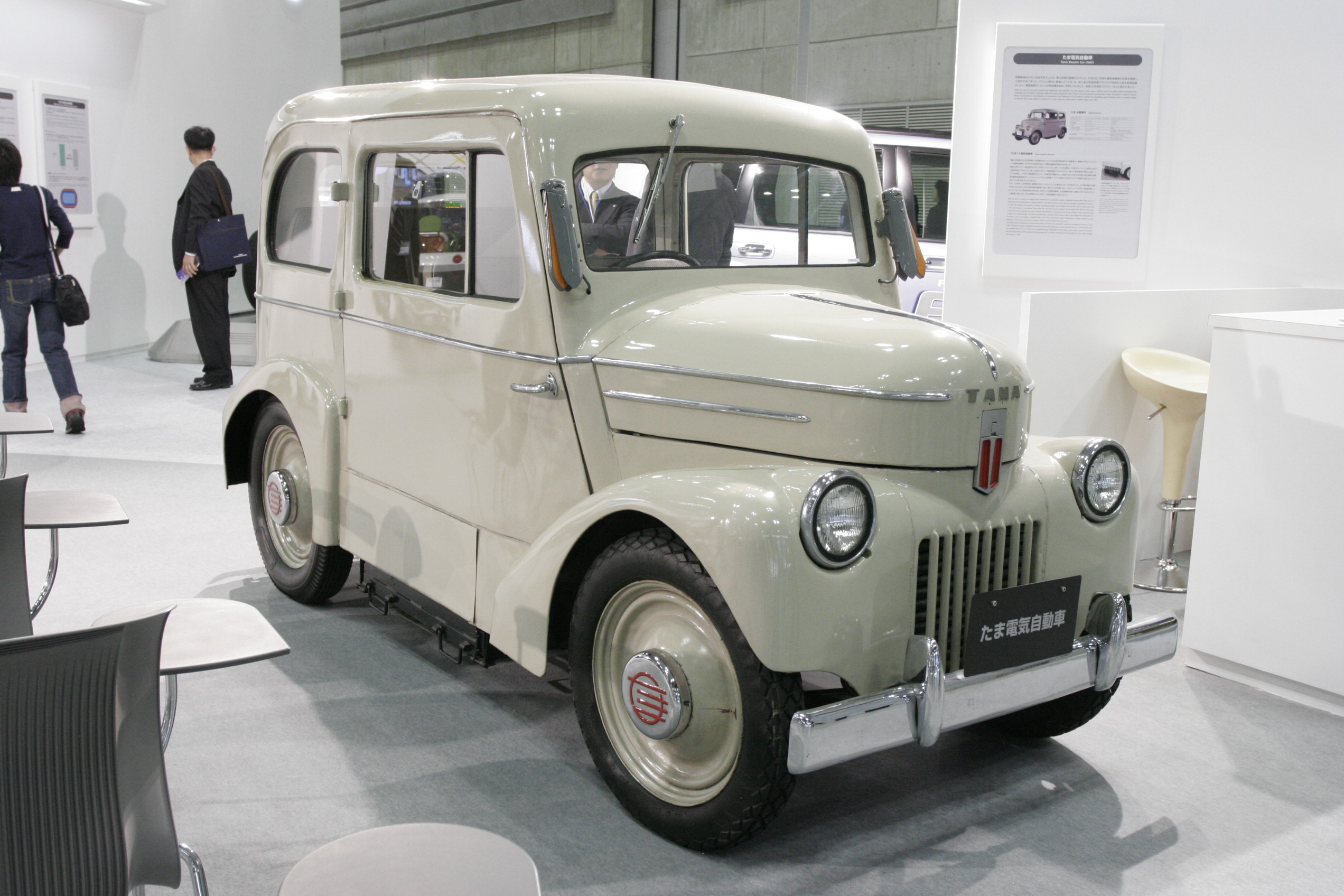
Tama electric vehicle (1946)

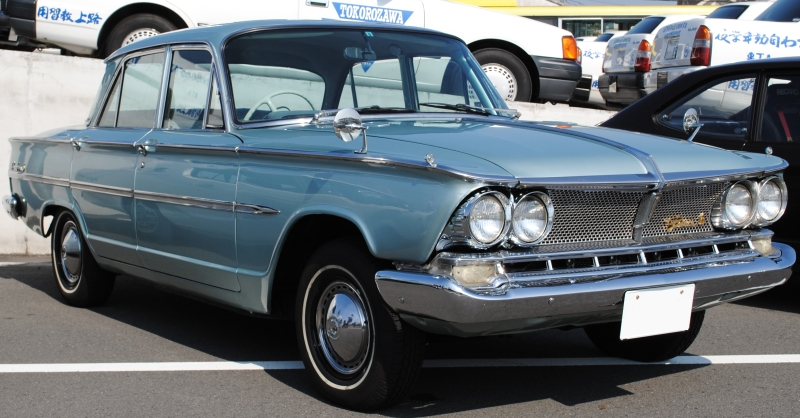
Prince Gloria Super 6 or S40

== Model designation system ==
Up to 1961, Prince used a four-letter model code for its vehicles. The first letter stood for the engine code (A was 1500 cc, B was 1900 cc), the second letter stood for the chassis model, the third letter stood for the body type (S for sedan, T for cabover truck, V for van, P for pickup truck and so on) and the fourth letter was the order of production. A fifth letter was sometimes added, and this was the model version (S for standard, D for deluxe). A number was added to the end to delineate revisions of the same model. This number was a Roman numeral until 1956, after which it was an Arabic numeral.

From 1962, Prince switched to an alpha-numeric code, similar to what Nissan would eventually use.

== History ==
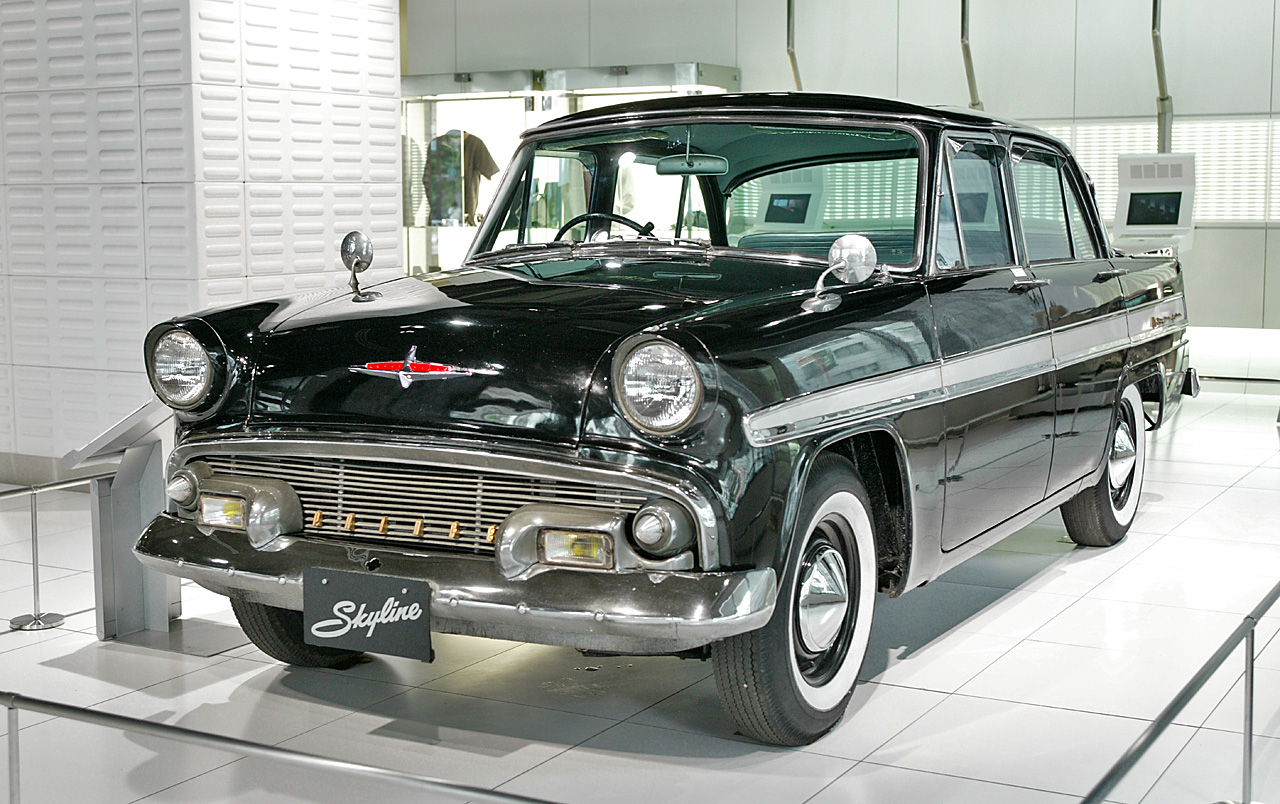
Prince Skyline ALSI-1

The Prince Motor Company had two origins.

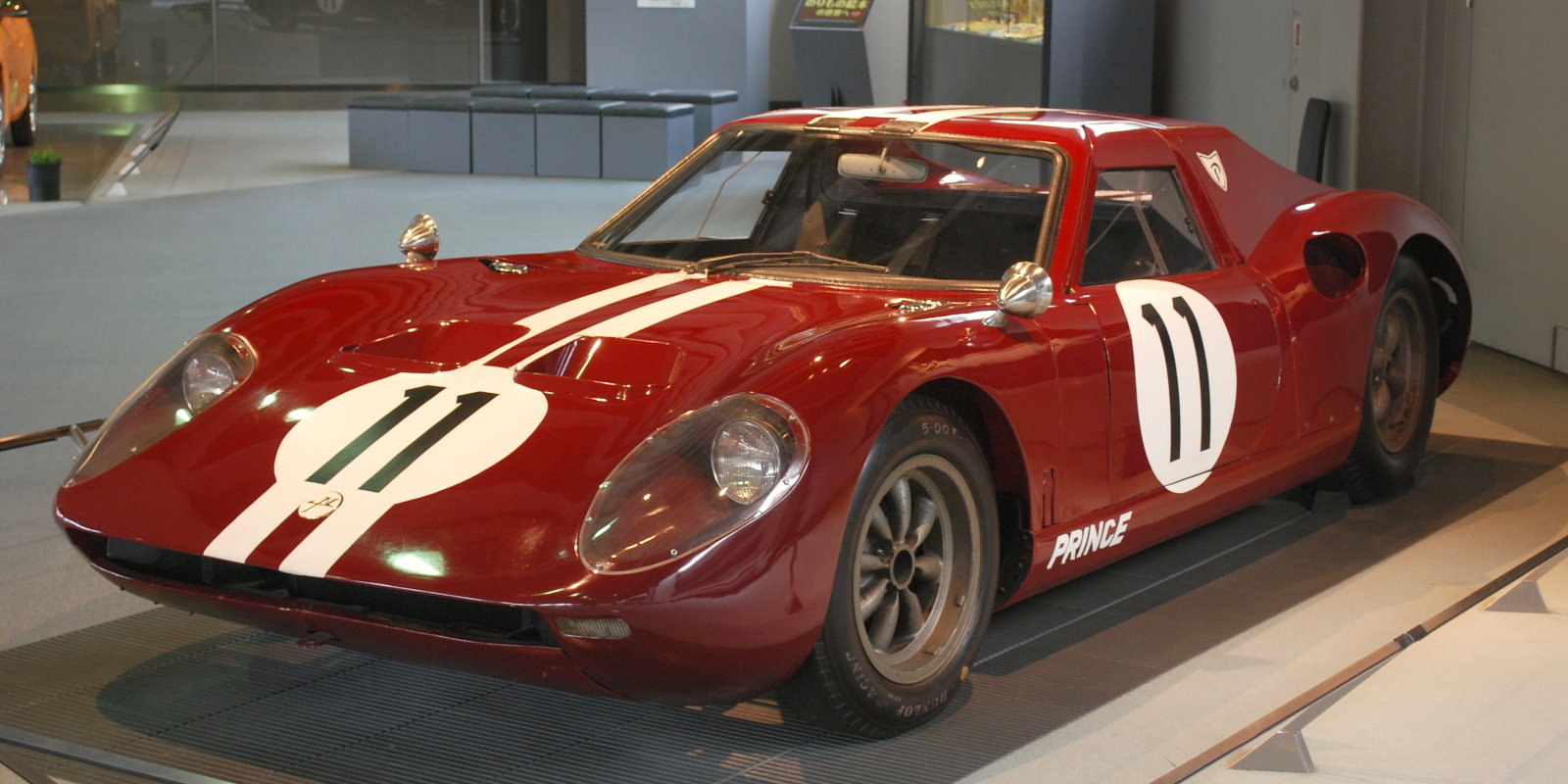
1966 Prince R380

=== Tachikawa Aircraft Company ===
- December 1946 - The electric car division of the Tachikawa Aircraft Company became independent and was activated as the Fuchu Plant of the Kosoku Kikan Kogyo Co., Ltd..
- June 30, 1947 - The Fuchu Plant of the Kosoku Kikan Kogyo Co., Ltd. became the Tokyo Electric Car Company. (Official foundation date of the Prince Motor Company.)
- February 1949 - Shojiro Ishibashi invested in the Tokyo Electric Car Company and became the chairman.
- November 30, 1949 - The Tokyo Electric Car Company changed its name to Tama Electric Car Company.
- November 1951 - The Tama Electric Car Company changed its name to Tama Motor Company.
- November 1952 - The Tama Motor Company changed its name to Prince Motor Company.
- April 10, 1954 - The Prince Motor Company merged with its engine supplier Fuji Precision Industries. The new company was named Fuji Precision Industries and the name Prince Motor Company disappeared in the meantime.

=== Nakajima Aircraft Company ===
- August 16, 1945 - The Nakajima Aircraft Company changed its name to Fuji Sangyo Co., Ltd..
- November 6, 1945 - The GHQ defined Fuji Sangyo as the Zaibatsu and decided to disband them.
- May 1950 - Fuji Sangyo Co., Ltd. was disbanded.
- July 1950 - Fuji Sangyo Co., Ltd. was divided into twelve companies. Of them, the Tokyo Plant (located in Suginami, Tokyo) and the Hamamatsu Plant became Fuji Precision Industries.
- April 1951 - Shojiro Ishibashi became the chairman of Fuji Precision Industries.
- April 10, 1954 - Fuji Precision Industries merged with its customer Prince Motor Company. The new company was named Fuji Precision Industries and the name Prince Motor Company disappeared in the meantime.

=== After Merger of Fuji/Prince Until Merger with Nissan ===
- February 1961 - Fuji Precision Industries changed its name to Prince Motor Company. (The name "Prince Motor Company" revived.)
- 1962 - Prince became the first Japanese car company to field a works team in a European rally, the Liège-Sofia-Liège. Neither of the two Skylines entered finished the rally, which had an 82 percent attrition rate.
- May 1965 - Prince Motor Company announced the merger with Nissan Motor Company.
- August 1966 - Merged into Nissan Motor Company.

== List of vehicles ==
- Prince Sedan (the first passenger car of Prince)
- Prince Gloria (a luxury sedan & wagon)
- Prince Skyline (a performance coupe/sedan)
  - Prince Skyway (a delivery van based on the Skyline)
  - Prince Miler (a pickup truck based on the Skyline)
  - Nissan Laurel (a compact luxury sedan/coupe based on the Skyline)
- Prince Homy (a cargo van/minibus)
  - Prince Homer (a pickup truck based on the Homy)
- Prince R380 (a race car)
- Nissan Prince Royal (a limousine made for the Imperial Household of Japan)
- Nissan Cherry (a small front-wheel-drive coupe and sedan)
- Prince Clipper (a cabover truck)
  - Prince Light Coach (a large capacity passenger bus shared with the Clipper)

=== Concept vehicles ===
- 1956 Prince BNSJ: Displayed at the 1956 Tokyo Motor Show, the BNSJ was much larger compared to other Japanese cars of the era and was the first non-production prototype (concept) displayed at the Tokyo Motor Show. It was powered by the FG4A-20 engine, but was enlarged to 1.9L. The BNSJ never entered production.
- 1956 Prince DPSK: The DPSK was developed as part of Japan's "National Car" program of 1955, similar to the German program that resulted in the Volkswagen Beetle. The proposal called for a 4-seater with an engine of 350 cc to 500 cc, a weight of around 400 kg (882 lb) and a top speed of 100 km/h (62 mph). The 495 kg (1,091 lb) DPSK was powered by a rear-mounted 24 hp, 601cc two-cylinder boxer engine known as the FG2D. This engine suffered from vibration and noise problems and was later replaced with a 599cc, 36 hp four-cylinder boxer engine called the FG4C and the car became the CPSK. Prince persevered with this concept until 1959 when the National Car program was cancelled, likely due to Prince becoming a more upscale quality car manufacturer.
- 1963 Prince 1900 Sprint: Based on the Skyline 1500, the Sprint was designed by Scaglione of Italy and powered by the 1.9L GB-4 engine from the Gloria. The Sprint was shown at the 1963 Tokyo Motor Show, but did not enter production.

== See also ==
- Shojiro Ishibashi
- Ryoichi Nakagawa
- Jiro Tanaka
- Shinichiro Sakurai
- Naganori Ito
