= 210 (disambiguation) =

210 is a year.

210 may also refer to:

- 210 (number)
- 210 BC, a year

== Astronomy ==
- 210 Isabella, an asteroid in the asteroid belt
- NGC 210, a barred spiral galaxy

== Literature ==
- Lectionary 210, a Greek manuscript
- Minuscule 210, a Greek minuscule manuscript

== Technology ==
- Nokia Asha 210, a mobile phone
- TENET 210, a mainframe computer

== Transportation ==
- Flight 210 (disambiguation), multiple notable plane flights
- List of highways numbered 210

=== Aircraft ===
- Aquila A 210, a German light aircraft
- Cessna 210 Centurion, an American light aircraft
- Junkers Jumo 210, a V12 gasoline aircraft engine
- Loire 210, a French seaplane
- Messerschmitt Me 210, a German heavy fighter
- Saab 210, a Swedish experimental aircraft
- Sperwill 210, a British paramotor
- Wibault 210, a French monoplane fighter aircraft

=== Automobiles ===
- Chevrolet 210, an American car series
- Datsun 210, multiple different Japanese automobiles

=== Trains ===
- British Rail Class 210, a series of diesel-electric multiple unit passenger trains
- DB Class 210, a series of diesel locomotives

=== Watercraft ===
- Beneteau First 210, a French sailboat
- Buccaneer 210, an American sailboat
- USS Grenadier (SS-210), Tambor-class submarine of the U.S. Navy

== Other uses ==
- MicroRNA 210, a protein
- No. 210 Squadron RAF, a Royal Air Force unit
- UFC 210, a mixed martial arts event

== See also ==
- 210th (disambiguation)
