= Fuji Motorsports Museum =

- 富士モータースポーツミュージアム
- Established: 7 October 2022; 4 years ago
- Location: Oyama, Shizuoka, Japan
- Coordinates: 35.367855°N 138.91848°E
- Type: Motorsports museum
- Collections: Racing automobiles
- Collection size: About 40 vehicles
- Owners: Toyota Fudosan (owner), Toyota Motor Company (project owner)
- Website: fuji-motorsports-museum.jp/en/

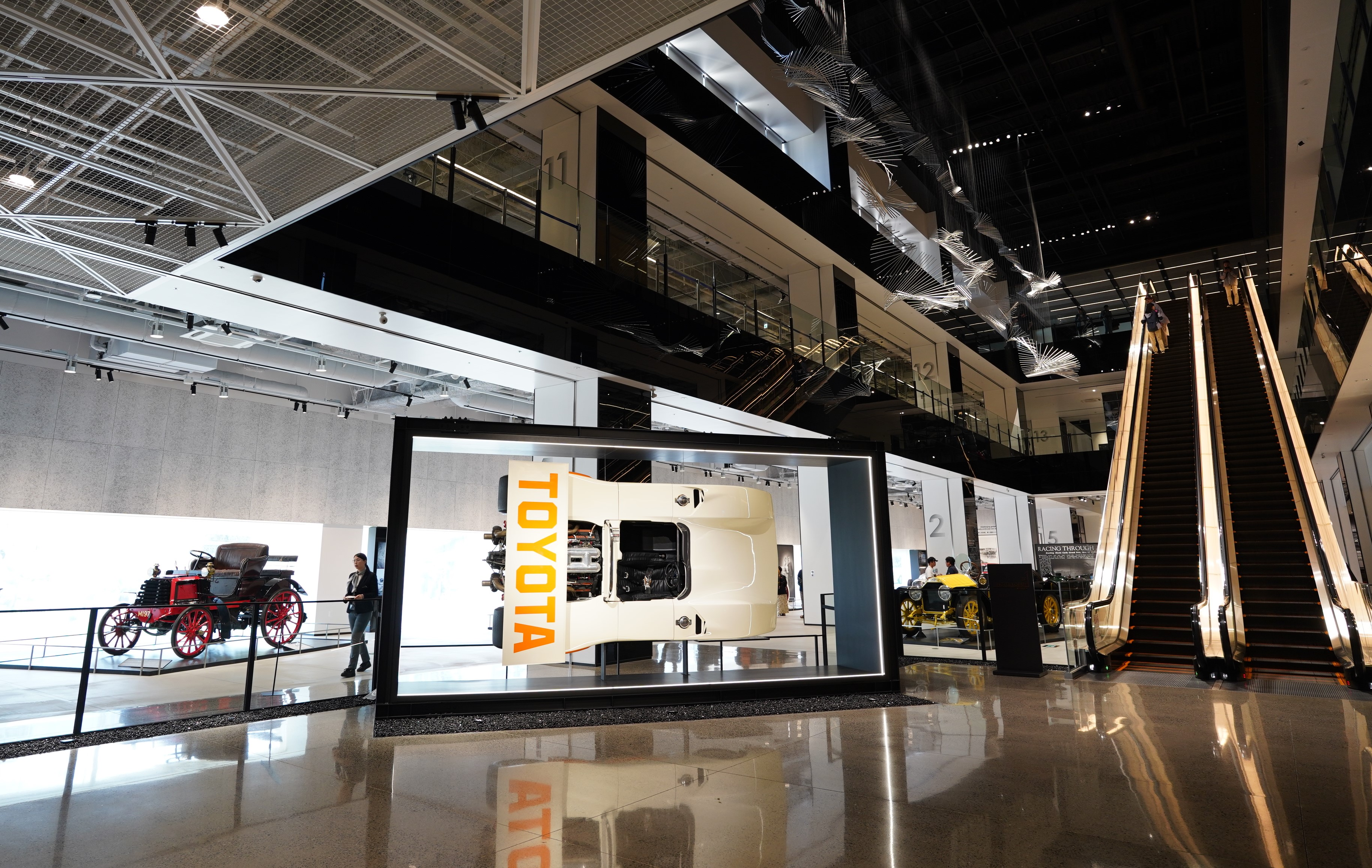
First floor of the Fuji Motorsports Museum, inside the Fuji Speedway Hotel building entrance

The Fuji Motorsports Museum (富士モータースポーツミュージアム) is a motorsports museum located in the Fuji Speedway Hotel, on the west side of Fuji Speedway, in Oyama, Suntō District, Shizuoka Prefecture, Japan. It opened in 2022.

== Overview ==
The museum aims to introduce the history of motorsports for over 130 years, including roughly 40 exhibits systematically presented.

The museum is a permanent exhibition facility housed in the Fuji Speedway Hotel building, located right next to Fuji Speedway, one of the largest racing circuits in Japan. The museum occupies the first and second floors of the hotel building. The museum, hotel and circuit together make up "Fuji Motorsports Forest", a regional development project promoted by Toyota Motor Comnapny and Fuji Speedway. The hotel itself is owned by Toyota Fudosan, a real-estate company of Toyota Group, and operated by Hyatt Hotels & Resorts as one of The Unbound Collection by Hyatt Hotels.

== Collection ==
Almost all of the collection are racing automobiles. In addition, there are some exhibits of motorsports related materials to tell the thoughts of the creators of the vehicles.

Although the museum is funded by the Toyota Group and under the supervision of the Toyota Automobile Museum, the exhibits are not limited to the Toyota's automobiles. The museum follows the same policy as the Toyota Automobile Museum (similar to the Volkswagen Group's ZeitHaus in the Autostadt, Germany), displaying automobiles of the various manufacturers with cooperation of 10 Japanese and foreign automobile companies, and other cooperating organizations.

=== Exhibit cooperating companies/organizations ===
- The Henry Ford
- Hino Motors
- HKS
- Honda & Honda Collection Hall
- Mazda
- Mercedes-Benz AG
- Mitsubishi Motors
- Mooncraft
- Nissan
- Porsche
- Subaru
- Toyota & Toyota Automobile Museum
- Yamaha Motor Company

=== List of vehicles (partial) ===
Exhibit vehicles are scheduled to be replaced irregularly.

Manufacturer	Model	Year	Notable driver(s)	Notes
Panhard et Levassor	Type B2	1899	-	
Ford	999	1902	Henry Ford, Barney Oldfield	[R]
Stutz	Bearcat Series F	1914	-	
Sunbeam	Grand Prix	1922	Kenelm Lee Guinness	1922 French Grand Prix, #16.
Bugatti	Type 35B	1926	-	
Alfa Romeo	6C 1750 Gran Sport	1930	-	
Mercedes-Benz	W25	1934	Manfred von Brauchitsch	1934 Eifelrennen winner; The beginning of the "Silver Arrows". [R]
Cisitalia	202C	1947	-	1948 Mille Miglia.
Toyota	Toyopet Racer	1951	-	[R]
Nissan	Datsun 210	1958	Yoshitane Oya, Allan Gibbons, Yonekichi Minawa	Sakura-go (桜号). 1958 Round Australia Rally, #14.
Honda	RC162	1961	Kunimitsu Takahashi	Racing motorcycle. 1961 West German Grand Prix (250 cc) winner; First ever Grand Prix motorcycle race win for Japanese riders.
Hino	Contessa 900	1961	Yoshiji Tachihara	1963 Japanese Grand Prix - CIII Class winner.
Porsche	904 Carrera GTS	1964	Antonio Pucci, Colin Davis	1964 Targa Florio winner.
Honda	RA272	1965	Richie Ginther	1965 Mexican Grand Prix winner; First ever Formula One race win for Japanese manufacturers. [R]
Toyota	7 (474S)	1969	Minoru Kawai	1969 Japan Can-Am winner.
Nissan	R382	1969	Kunimitsu Takahashi, Kenji Tohira	1969 Japanese Grand Prix, #23.
Mitsubishi	Lancer 1600GSR	1974	Joginder Singh, David Doig	1974 Safari Rally winner.
Nissan	Violet GT	1981	Shekhar Mehta; Mike Doughty	1981 Safari Rally winner.
Mooncraft	Footwork Mooncraft Special 7	1987	Aguri Suzuki	March-Yamaha 85J with the "MCS" (Mooncraft Special) body. 1987 Fuji Grand Champion Series, #55.
Mazda	787B	1991	Volker Weidler, Johnny Herbert, Bertrand Gachot	1991 24 Hours of Le Mans overall winner; First ever 24 Hours of Le Mans overall win for Japanese manufacturers. [R]
All American Racers	Eagle MkIII	1993	Juan Manuel Fangio II	1993 IMSA GTP champion.
Toyota	Celica GT-Four ST185	1993	Juha Kankkunen, Nicky Grist	1993 Australian Rally winner.
Mitsubishi	Lancer Evolution III	1995	Kenneth Eriksson, Staffan Parmander	1995 Australian Rally winner.
Subaru	Impreza 555	1996	Colin McRae, Derek Ringer	1996 Acropolis Rally winner.
Nissan	Pennzoil Nismo Skyline GT-R	1998	Masami Kageyama, Érik Comas	1998 JGTC champion (GT500 class).
Lola	B2/00	2002	Cristiano da Matta	2002 CART champion.
Toyota	Camry	2008	Kyle Busch	2008 Kobalt Tools 500 winner; First ever NASCAR premier series race win for Japanese manufacturers. [R]
Toyota	TF109	2009	Kamui Kobayashi	2009 Abu Dhabi Grand Prix, #10.
Toyota	GR Supra	2019	Nobuteru Taniguchi	Drifting custom car, built by HKS.

Notes:

- [R] Highly detailed replica built by each automobile manufacturer.
