= Tenet (disambiguation) =

Tenet is a 2020 science fiction action-thriller film written and directed by Christopher Nolan.

Tenet may also refer to:

== Media ==
- Tenet (soundtrack), the soundtrack album to the film
- Tenet Media, a right-wing US influencer group allegedly funded by Russia
- Tenet (Canadian band), a thrash metal band
- Tenet (ensemble), an American early music vocal and instrumental group

== Other uses ==
- Tenet Healthcare, a healthcare services company based in Dallas, Texas, US
- TENET (network), the de facto national research and education network in South Africa
- TENET, one of the five words in the first-century Latin word puzzle Sator Square
- TENET 210, a mainframe computer designed for timesharing services
- George Tenet (born 1953), former Director of United States Central Intelligence Agency

== See also ==
- Tenet v. Doe, a 2005 U.S. Supreme Court case
- Tennet (disambiguation)
