= C210 =

C210 or variant, may refer to:

== Vehicles ==
- Avia C-210, a trainer variant of the Avia S-199 propeller-driven fighter airplane
- Cessna 210 Centurion (C 210), general aviation light airplane
- Nissan Skyline C210, a sports car
- SpaceX Crew Dragon Endurance (C210), a SpaceX Dragon 2 crew carrying space capsule

== Other uses ==
- Canadian Federal Parliamentary private member Bill C-210, a law concerning the national anthem of Canada
- Nokia C210; a cellphone, see List of HMD Global products
- Common Programming Interface for Communications (CPI-C; standard C210), an API for IBM environments

== See also ==
- C21 (disambiguation)
- 210 (disambiguation)
- C (disambiguation)
