= Tennet =

Tennet may refer to:

- Tennet people, an ethnic group in South Sudan
- Tennet language, the language of the Tennet people
- TenneT, the national electricity transmission system operator of the Netherlands, and in parts of Germany

== See also ==
- Tenet (disambiguation)
- Tenneti (disambiguation)
