= Tenneti =

Tenneti may refer to:

- Tenneti Hemalata (1935–1997), Indian Woman writer popularly known as Lata
- Tenneti Viswanadham (1896–1979), Indian Politician from Visakhapatnam
- Tenneti Park, Visakhapatnam, India

== See also ==
- Tennet (disambiguation)
