= Toyota USA Automobile Museum =

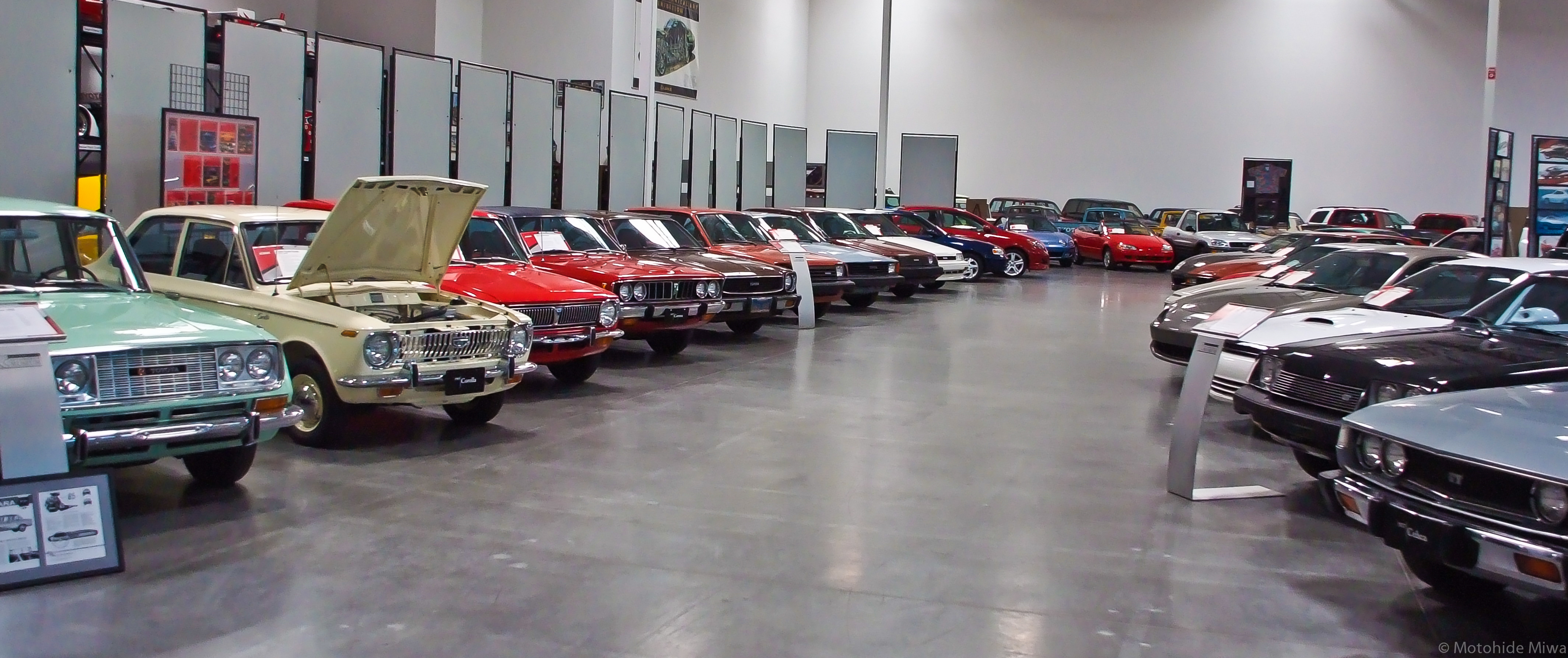
- Dissolved: September 28, 2017; 8 years ago
- Location: 19600 Van Ness Avenue; Torrance, California
- Coordinates: 33.852016°N 118.317165°W
- Type: Automobile museum
- Website: http://www.toyotaUSAmuseum.com/

The Toyota USA Automobile Museum was an automobile museum located in Torrance, California, adjacent to the Toyota Motor Sales USA. The 45,000 ft^{2} (4,200 m^{2}) location had its grand-reopening on its 10th anniversary. The museum closed on September 28, 2017. It was the only official Toyota Museum outside Japan; with the Toyota Automobile Museum located in Nagakute, Japan.

The museum, which was maintained by the TMS Corporate Communications Department. was intended to preserve a collection of historical models milestone vehicles representing Toyota’s history in the United States. The museum's inventory consisted of more than 100 Toyota, Lexus and Scion vehicles, dating from 1958 to 2013.

== Notable exhibits ==
- Hollywood/Futuristic: the Lexus “Minority Report” Tom Cruise movie prototype, three very rare Toyota 2000GTs, along with a poster of the James Bond movie, “You Only Live Twice”, where the car appeared, plus a cutaway drawing and technical schematics
- Racing: Ivan “Ironman” Stewart's famous off-road stadium truck; GTP race cars; a Long Beach Grand Prix historical photo wall; and the Chip Ganassi Target Champ Car, NASCAR, and the Land Speed Record Prius.
- New Brand: the recently introduced Scion xA and xB and tC vehicles
- Environmental: The Prius, an early mass-produced gasoline/electric hybrid vehicle, along with a cutaway drawing
- Design: CALTY studio concept drawings, clay and 3-D fiberglass models
- One of a Kind: several serial No. 1 vehicles from U.S. and Canadian manufacturing plants, along with some pre-production prototype vehicles

== See also ==
- Official Toyota USA Automobile Museum website
