= Toyota Automobile Museum =

Museum in Nagakute, Aichi, Japan

- トヨタ博物館
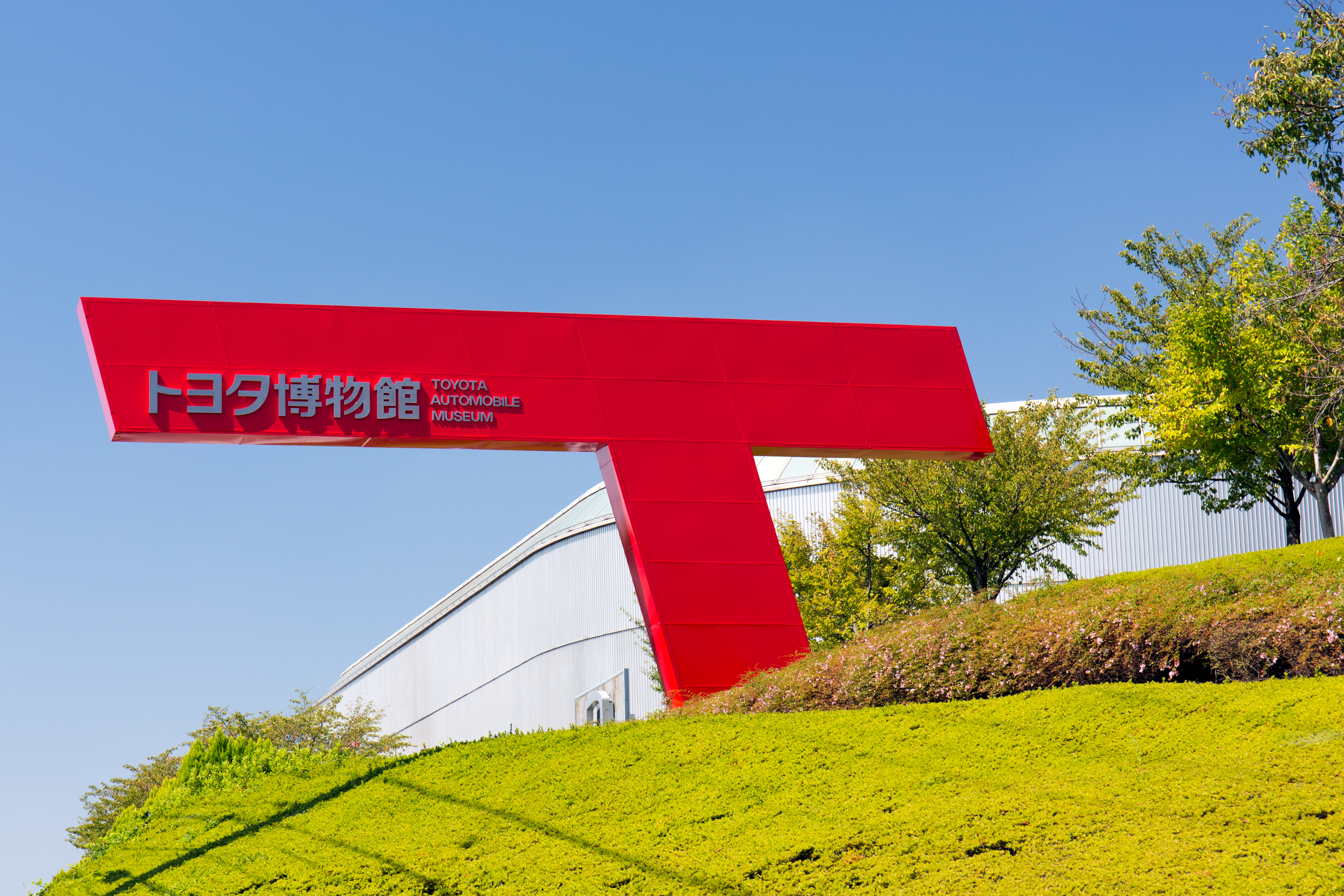
- Toyota Automobile Museum entry

- Location within Aichi Prefecture Location within Japan
- Established: April 1989; 37 years ago
- Location: Nagakute, Aichi, Japan
- Coordinates: 35.172744°N 137.05802°E
- Type: Science museum
- Owner: Toyota Motors
- Website: www.toyota.co.jp/Museum/

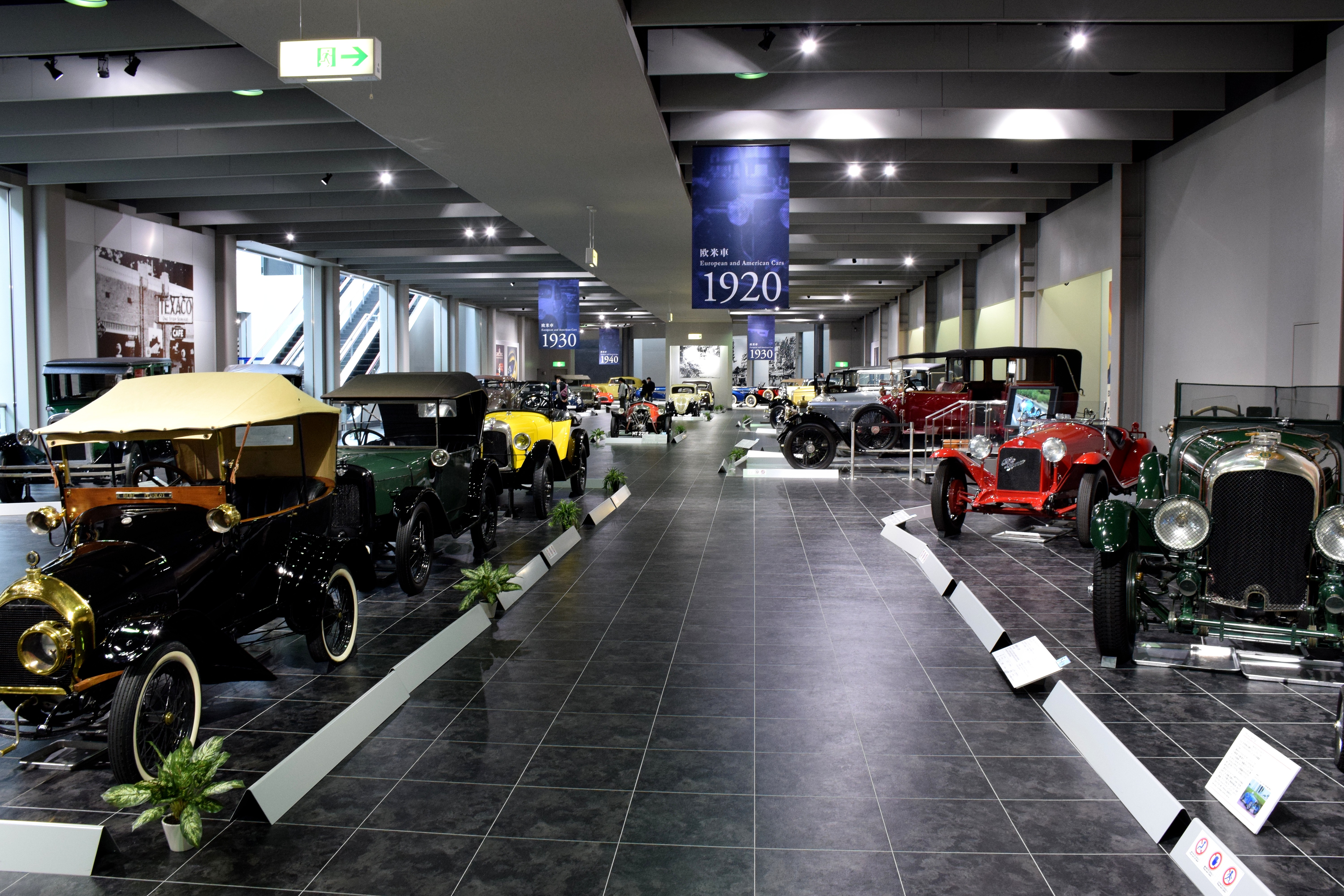
Automobiles in the museum

The Toyota Automobile Museum (トヨタ博物館, Toyota Hakubutsukan) is a large museum showcasing the history of Toyota as an automobile manufacturer. In addition to displaying its own vehicles that Toyota has manufactured over the years, numerous vehicles from other manufacturers of various makes are also being displayed in the museum. It is a large complex located in Nagakute city, a city close to Nagoya, Japan.

== Collection ==
Unlike the Toyota USA Automobile Museum, the museum in Nagoya also features many cars from other manufacturers, as well as artwork. The reserve collection includes some exceptional examples such as the 1922 Grand Prix Sunbeam.

The museum should not be confused with the Toyota Commemorative Museum of Industry and Technology, also located in Nagoya.

== List of vehicles (partial) ==
- Alfa Romeo 6C 1750 Gran Sport (1930)
- Austin 7 (1924)
- Bentley 4½ Litre (1930)

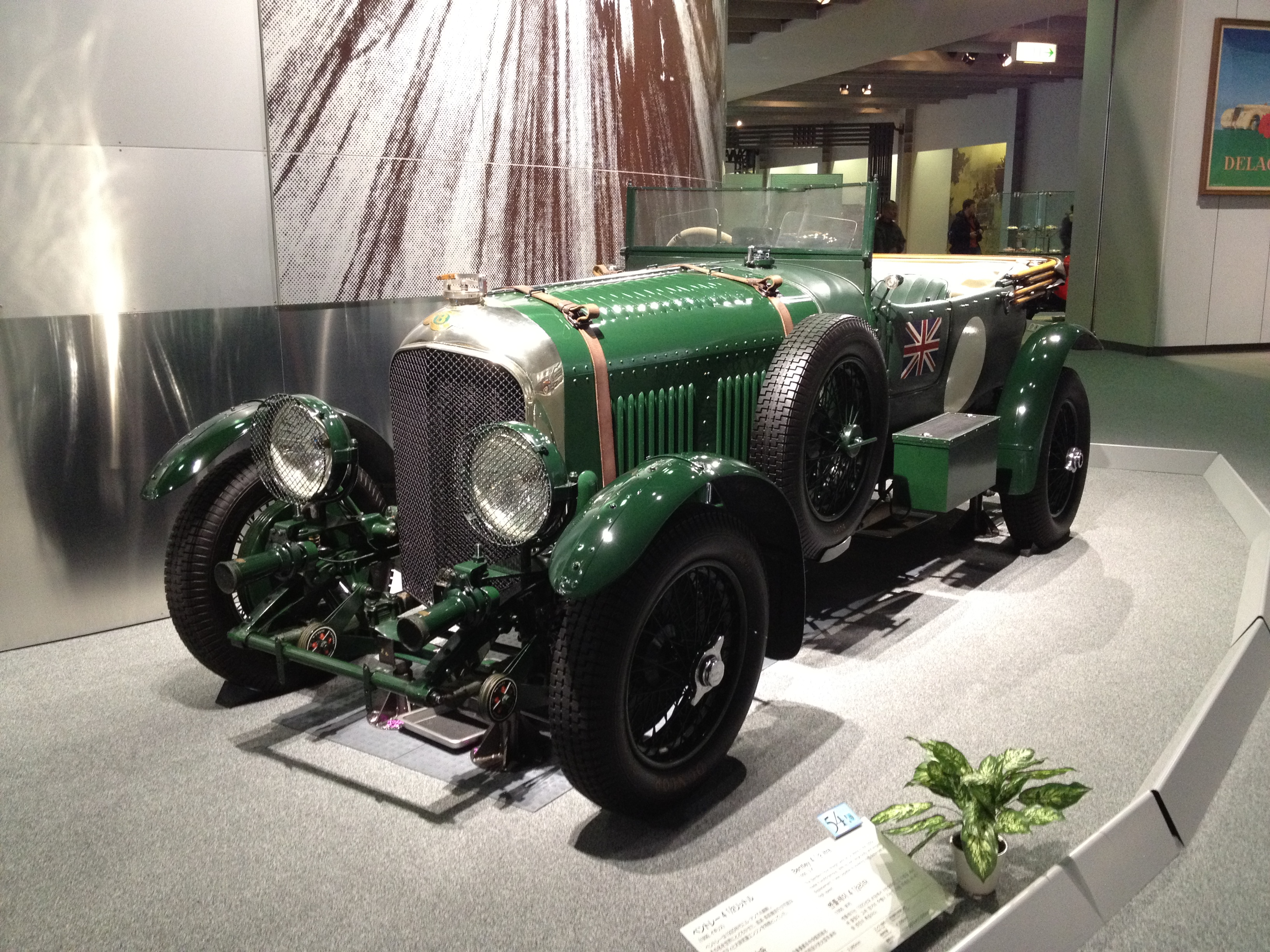
1930 Bentley 4½ Litre

- Benz Velo (1894)
- Bugatti Type 35C (1926)

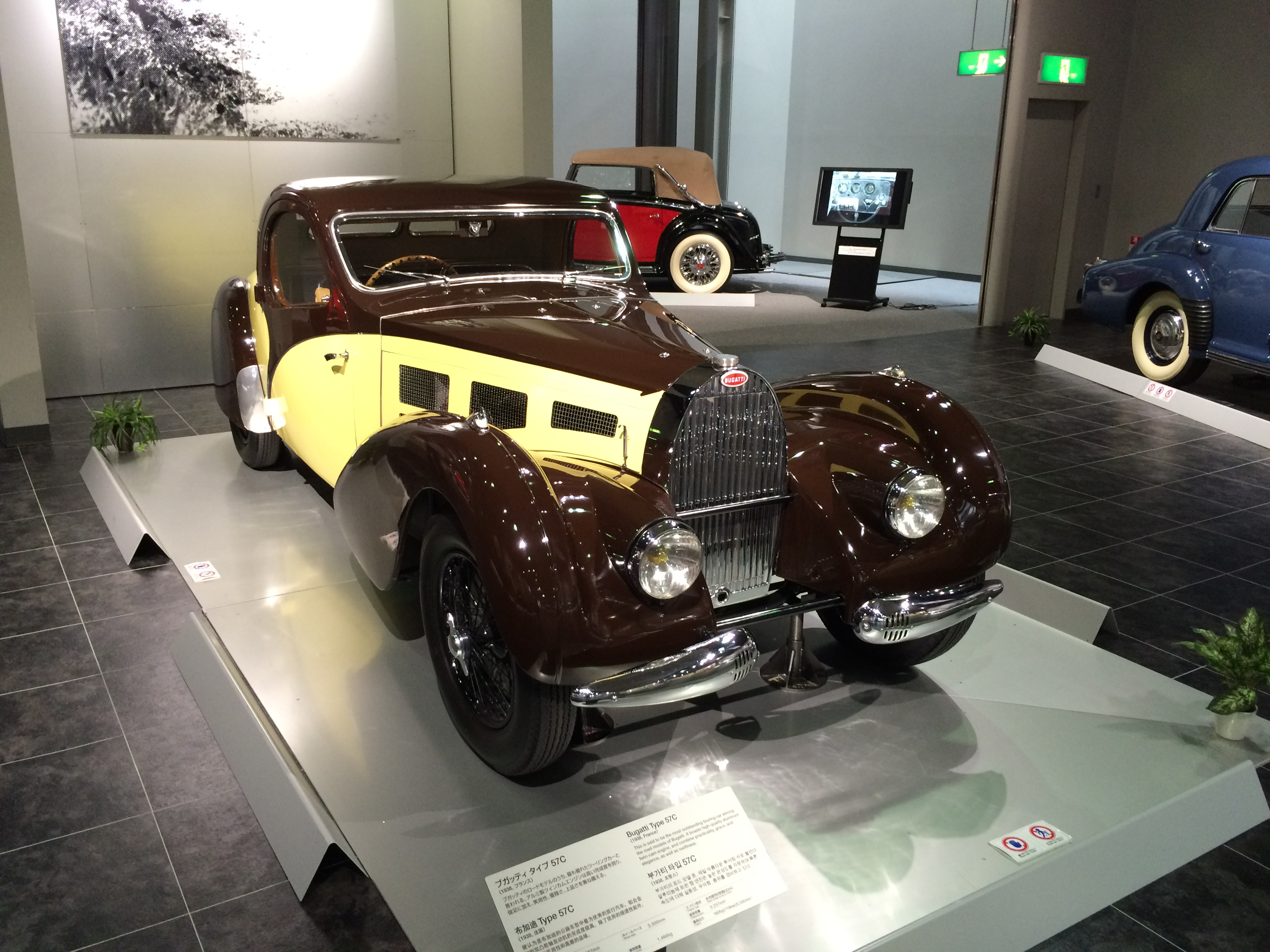
1938 Bugatti 57C

- Bugatti Type 57 (1938)
- Cadillac Model Thirty (1912)
- Cadillac 452A (1931)
- Cadillac Eldorado Biarritz (1959)
- Citroën C3 type 5CV (1925)
- Citroën DS19 (1958)
- Chevrolet Series 490 (1918)
- Chevrolet Series BA Confederate (1932)
- Chevrolet Corvette (C1) (1953)
- Chrysler Valiant (1960)
- Cord Model 812 (1937)
- Daihatsu Midget DKA (1959)
- Daimler Type 45 (1920)
- Delaunay-Belleville HB6L (1911)
- DeSoto Airflow Series SE (1934)
- De Dion-Bouton 1 3/4HP (1898)
- Duesenberg Model J (1929)
- Essex Coach (1923)
- Fiat 500 "Topolino" (1936)
- Flying Feather (1955)
- Ford Model A (1928)
- Ford Model T (1909)
- Ford Model 40
- Hispano-Suiza H6B (1928)

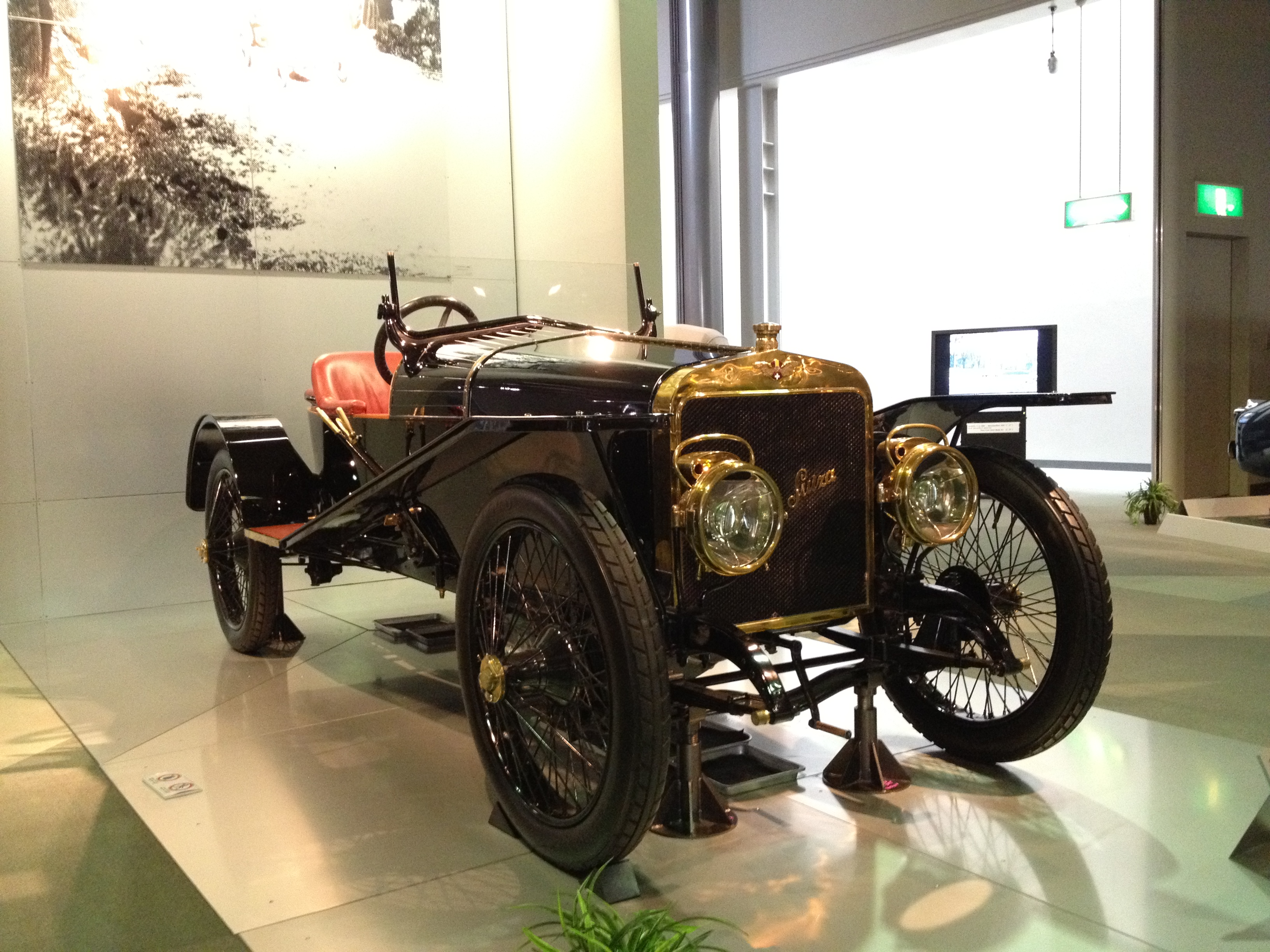
1912 Hispano-Suiza Alfonso XIII

- Hispano-Suiza Alfonso XIII (1912)
- Isuzu Bellett (1966)
- Isuzu 117 Coupe-PA90 (1970)
- Isuzu Hillman Minx (1960)
- Jaguar XK120 (1951)
- Kaiser Frazer Henry J (1951)
- Lancia Astura Tipo (1936)
- Lincoln-Zephyr (1937)
- Lotus Elite (1961)
- Mazda Cosmo Sport L10B (1969)
- Mitsubishi 500 (1961)
- Mercedes-Benz 500K (1935)
- Messerschmitt KR200 (1955)
- Morris Oxford (1913)
- Nissan Skyline 2000GT-B (S54-) (1967)
- Oldsmobile Curved Dash (1902)
- Packard 12 (Roosevelt car) (1939)
- Panhard et Levassor B2 (1898)
- Peugeot Bébé (1913)
- Peugeot 402 (1938)
- Porsche 356 (1951)
- Rolls-Royce Silver Ghost (1910)
- Rolls-Royce Phantom III (1937)

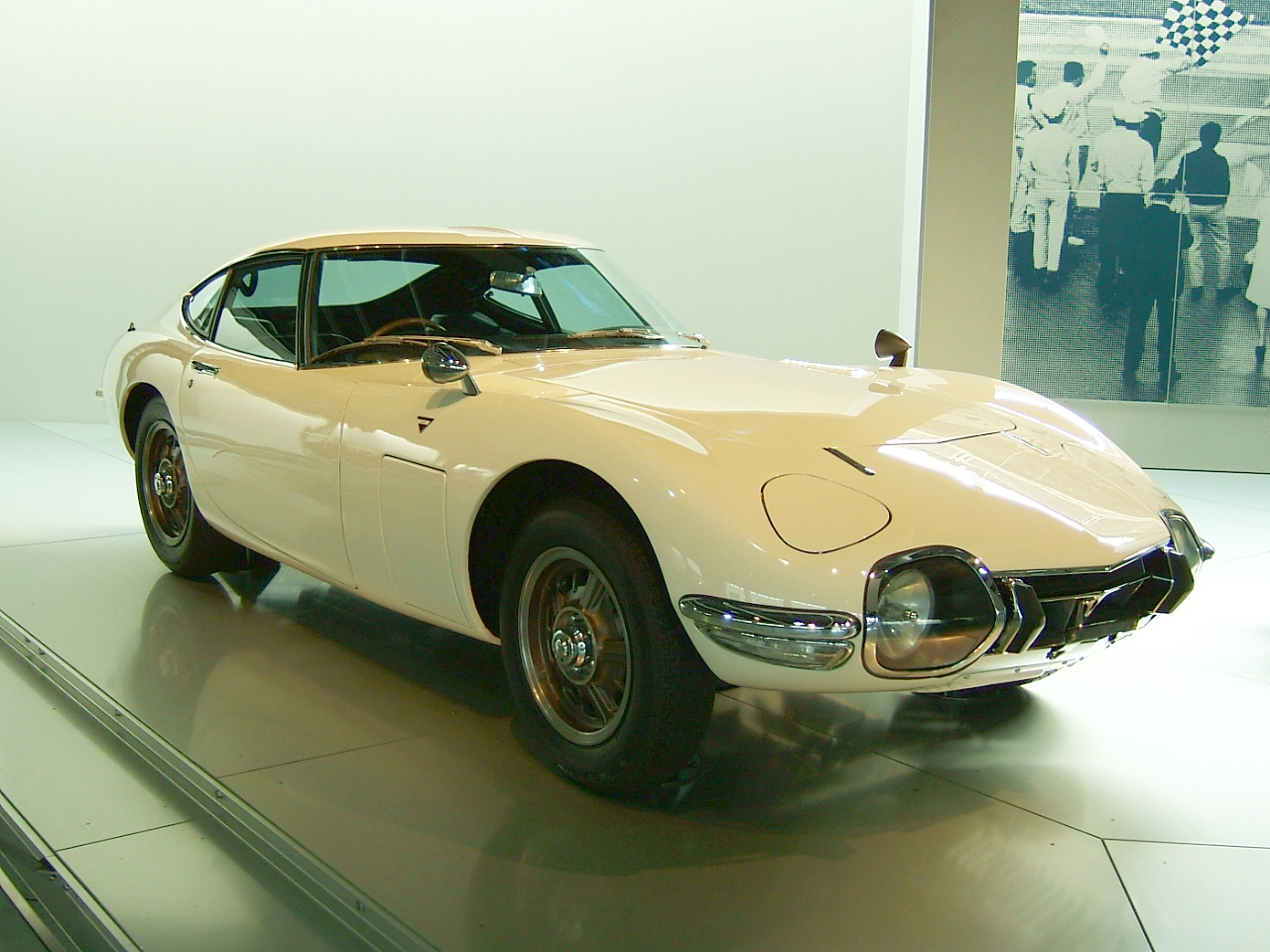
1968 Toyota 2000GT

- Saab 92 (1951)
- SS Jaguar 100 (1937)
- Stanley Steamer Model E2 (1909)
- Stutz Bearcat Series F (1914)
- Subaru 360 K111 (1958)
- Suzuki Fronte 360 (1967)
- Toyota FH24 truck fire engine type (1959)
- Toyoda AC (1947)
- Toyota Sports 800 UP15 (1965)
- Toyota 1600GT RT55 (1967)
- Toyota 2000GT MF10 (1968)
- Toyota Prius (1997)
- Thomas Flyer Model L (1908)
- Tsukuba Roland/Tsukuba-go (1935)
- Tucker 48 Torpedo (1948)
- Volvo PV544 (1959)

== See also ==
- Fuji Motorsports Museum - A museum dedicated to motorsports, supervised by the Toyota Automobile Museum.
