= Tsukuba Roland =

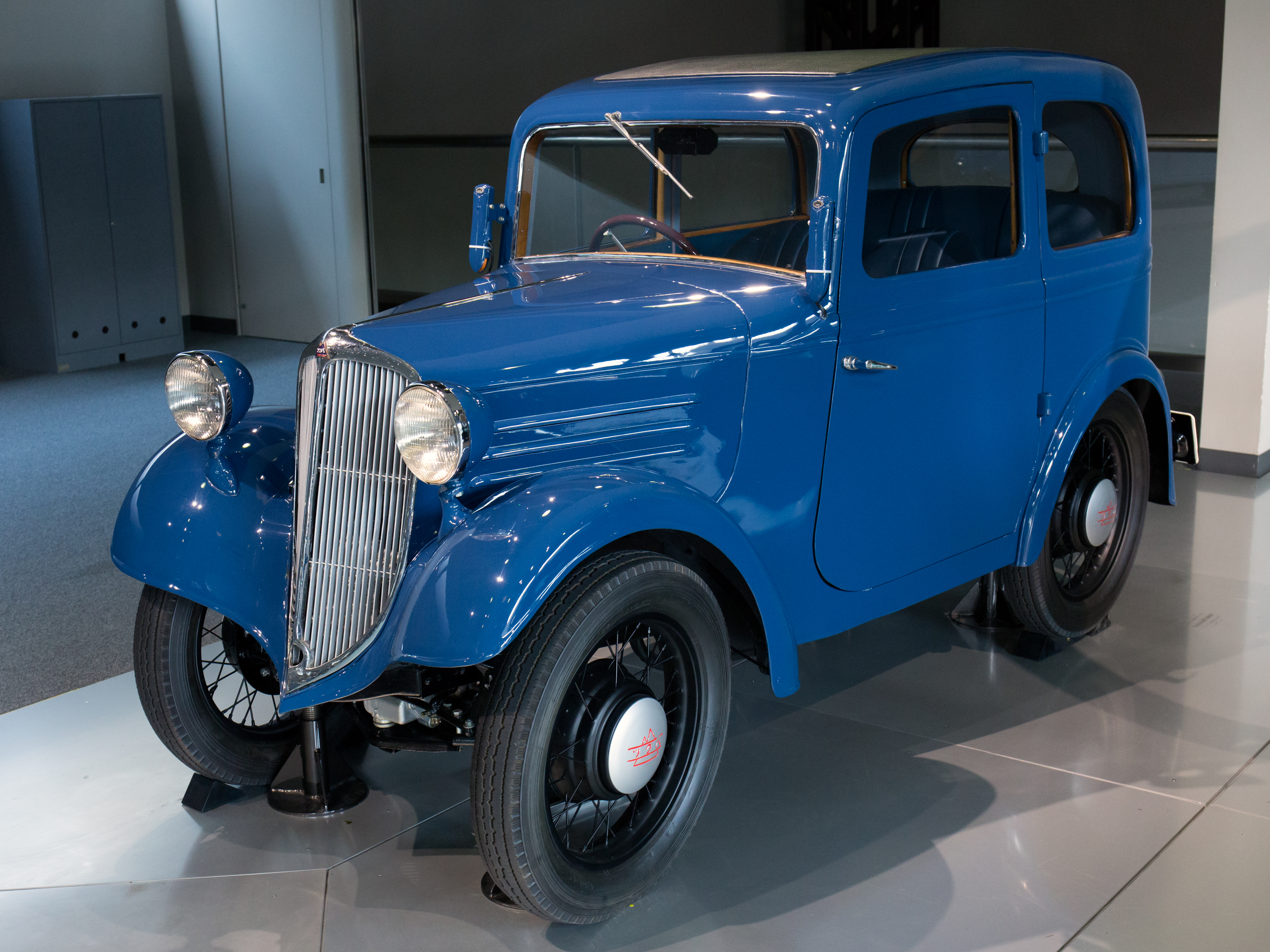

Overview
- Manufacturer: Tōkyō Jidōsha Seizō KK
- Also called: Tsukuba-go
- Production: 1932–1938; ~130 produced

Body and chassis
- Class: small car
- Body style: 2-door saloon; 2-door phaeton; 2-door truck
- Layout: FF layout

Powertrain
- Engine: 736 cc Meguro Seisakusho sv V4
- Transmission: 3-speed manual

Dimensions
- Wheelbase: 2,400 mm (94 in)
- Length: 3,200 mm (126 in)
- Width: 1,200 mm (47 in)
- Height: 1,500 mm (59 in)
- Kerb weight: ca. 500 kg (1,102 lb)

The Tsukuba Roland (Japanese: 筑波 ローランド), sometimes referred to as the "Tsukuba-go", is a small, front-wheel drive saloon car produced by Tokyo Automobile Manufacturing KK (東京自動車製造KK, Tōkyō Jidōsha Seizō KK) in Japan between 1932 and 1938. Tokyo Automobile Manufacturing outsourced most aspects of the production, including engine, chassis, and bodywork. It was Japan's first front-wheel drive automobile and the Tsukuba was even exported to China, which was under Japanese occupation at the time. However, the Sino-Japanese War also brought with it restrictions on raw materials and Tsukuba production came to a halt after only 130 examples had been built. One example remains in the Toyota Automobile Museum.

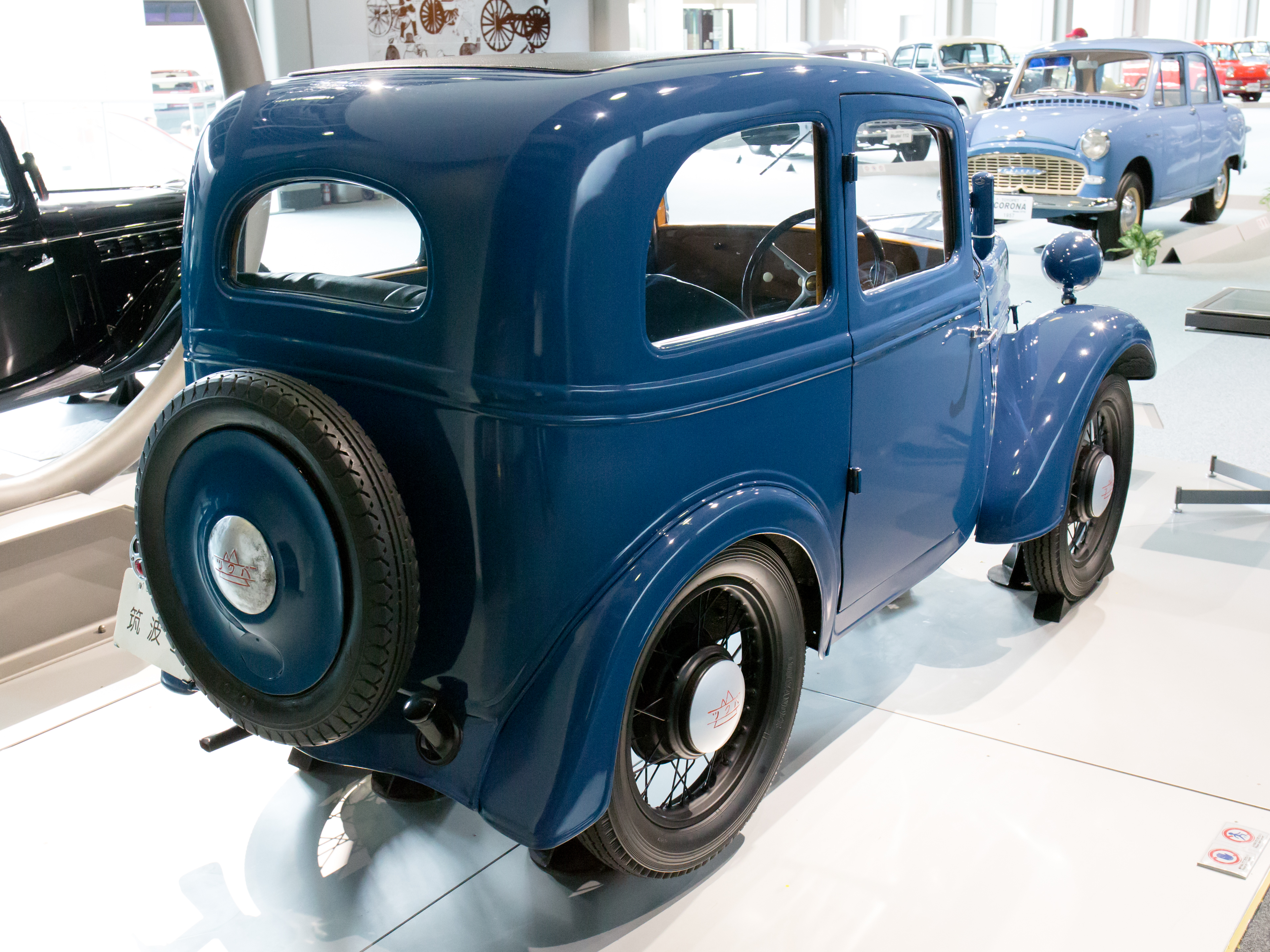
Tsukuba-go rear

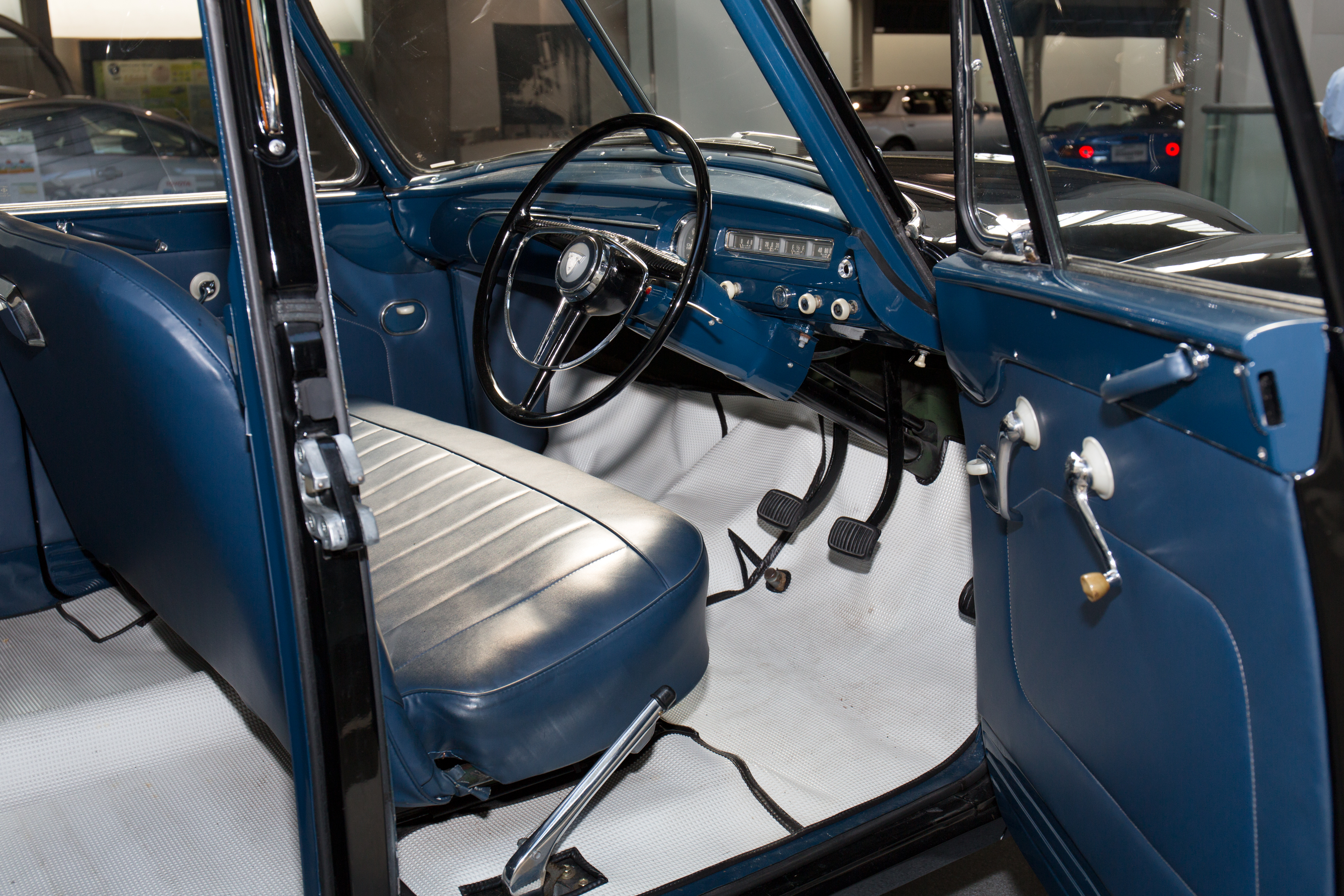
Tsukuba-go interior

The car was designed by autodidact automotive engineer Kazuaki Kawamada. Its layout was inspired by the american Cord L-29, but was considerably smaller. Unlike most of its contemporaries, the Tsukuba had independent suspension at all four wheels. The engine was an 736 cc V4.. It was of a flathead design with 25 degrees between the cylinder banks and maximum output was 18 PS (13 kW) at about 4,000 rpm. The engine was built by Meguro Seisakusho (目黒製作所), the chassis by Harajiro Body (腹白ボディ), and the body was by Press Kogyo (プレス工業). In addition to the standard two-door, closed saloon (with fabric at the roof centre section), a two-door phaeton and a truck variant were also available.
