= Lectionary 210 =

Lectionary ℓ 210
- New Testament manuscript
- Text: Evangelistarium †
- Date: 12th century
- Script: Greek
- Now at: Bodleian Library
- Size: 24.2 cm by 18.6 cm

Lectionary 210, designated by siglum ℓ 210 (in the Gregory-Aland numbering) is a Greek manuscript of the New Testament, on parchment. Palaeographically it has been assigned to the 12th century. Scrivener labelled it by 217^{evl}. The manuscript is lacunose.

== Description ==
The codex contains lessons from the Gospels of John, Matthew, Luke lectionary (Evangelistarium), on 227 parchment leaves (24.2 cm by 18.6 cm), with some lacunae at the end. 15 leaves (folios 213–227) were supplemented by a later hand on paper in the 15th century.

The text is written in Greek minuscule letters, in two columns per page, 21 lines per page. It contains musical notes and pictures.

There are daily lessons from Easter to Pentecost.

== History ==
F. H. A. Scrivener dated the manuscript to the 13th or 14th century, C. R. Gregory dated it to the 12th or 13th century. It is presently assigned by the INTF to the 12th century.

The manuscript was added to the list of New Testament manuscripts by Scrivener (number 217) and Gregory (number 210). Gregory saw it in 1883.

The manuscript is sporadically cited in the critical editions of the Greek New Testament (UBS3).

Currently the codex is located in the Bodleian Library (Wake 17) at Oxford.

== See also ==
- List of New Testament lectionaries
- Biblical manuscript
- Textual criticism

== Bibliography ==
- Gregory, Caspar René (1900). Textkritik des Neuen Testaments. Vol. 1. Leipzig: Hinrich. p. 404.
