= MicroRNA 210 =

MIR210

Identifiers
- Aliases: MIR210, MIRN210, mir-210, microRNA 210, MIRN210 microRNA, human
- External IDs: OMIM: 612982; GeneCards: MIR210; OMA:MIR210 - orthologs

Gene location (Human)
Chr.	Chromosome 11 (human)
Band	11p15.5	Start	568,089 bp
Band	11p15.5	End	568,198 bp
RNA expression pattern
Bgee	Human / Mouse (ortholog); Top expressed in: sural nerve; skin of leg; skin of abdomen; mucosa of esophagus; olfactory zone of nasal mucosa; vagina; urinary bladder; mucosa of transverse colon; skeletal muscle tissue; endometrium / n/a; More reference expression data
BioGPS	n/a
Orthologs
Species	Human	Mouse
Entrez	406992	n/a
Ensembl	ENSG00000199038	n/a
UniProt	n a	n/a
RefSeq (mRNA)	n/a	n/a
RefSeq (protein)	n/a	n/a
Location (UCSC)	Chr 11: 0.57 – 0.57 Mb	n/a
PubMed search		n/a
- Wikidata
View/Edit Human

MicroRNA 210 is a protein that in humans is encoded by the MIR210 gene.

== Function ==
MicroRNAs (miRNAs) are short (20-24 nt) non-coding RNAs that are involved in post-transcriptional regulation of gene expression in multicellular organisms by affecting both the stability and translation of mRNAs. miRNAs are transcribed by RNA polymerase II as part of capped and polyadenylated primary transcripts (pri-miRNAs) that can be either protein-coding or non-coding. The primary transcript is cleaved by the Drosha ribonuclease III enzyme to produce an approximately 70-nt stem-loop precursor miRNA (pre-miRNA), which is further cleaved by the cytoplasmic Dicer ribonuclease to generate the mature miRNA and antisense miRNA star (miRNA*) products. The mature miRNA is incorporated into a RNA-induced silencing complex (RISC), which recognizes target mRNAs through imperfect base pairing with the miRNA and most commonly results in translational inhibition or destabilization of the target mRNA. The RefSeq represents the predicted microRNA stem-loop. [provided by RefSeq, Sep 2009].
