= Minuscule 210 =

- New Testament manuscript
- Text: Gospels
- Date: 12th century
- Script: Greek
- Now at: Biblioteca Marciana
- Size: 37.5 cm by 29.5 cm
- Type: Byzantine
- Category: V
- Note: marginalia

Minuscule 210 is a Greek minuscule manuscript of the New Testament, made of parchment. It is designated by the siglum 210 in the Gregory-Aland numbering of New Testament manuscripts, and A^{133} in the von Soden numbering of New Testament manuscripts. Using the study of comparative writing styles (palaeography), it has been assigned to the 11th or 12th century. It has marginal notes.

== Description ==
The manuscript is a codex (precursor to the modern book format), containing an almost complete text of the four Gospels, written on 372 parchment leaves (sized 37.5 cm by 29.5 cm). The text is written in one column per page, in various number of lines per page. It has only one gap, with the manuscript missing Matthew 1:1-2:18. This text was supplied by a later hand.

The text is divided according to the chapters (known as κεφαλαια / kephalaia), whose numbers are given in the margin, and their titles (known as τιτλοι / titloi) written at the top of the pages. The biblical text is surrounded by a Catenae (this being a biblical commentary). In the Gospel of Mark, the commentary is by Victorinus of Pettau. There are rich blue and gold illuminations and pictures of Saint Mark and Luke.

== Text ==
The Greek text of the codex is considered to be a representative of the Byzantine text-type. Biblical scholar Kurt Aland placed it in Category V of his New Testament manuscript classification system. Category V manuscripts are described as "manuscripts with a purely or predominantly Byzantine text." It was not examined by using the Claremont Profile Method.

== History ==
The earliest history of the manuscript is unknown. It was examined by biblical scholar Andreas Birch and clergyman and scholar Dean Burgon. Biblical scholar Caspar René Gregory saw it in 1886.

Is it currently dated by the INTF to the 11th century. It is presently housed at the Biblioteca Marciana (shelf number Fondo ant. 27), in Venice.

== See also ==
- Minuscule 211
- Minuscule 209
- List of New Testament minuscules
- Biblical manuscript
- Textual criticism
