= Flight 210 =

Flight 210 may refer to:

Listed chronologically

- VASP Flight 210, crashed during a takeoff attempt on 28 January 1986
- Bellview Airlines Flight 210, crashed on 22 October 2005
