= Sunbeam Grand Prix (1922) =

Sunbeam cars in a motor racing event

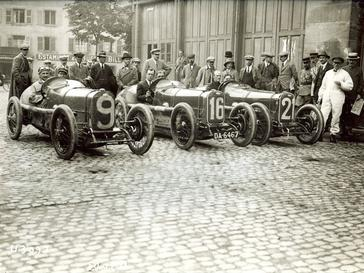
The 1922 Grand Prix Sunbeam Team in Strasbourg (Mathieson-Taylor Archive)

Sunbeam Works Racing cars participated in the 1922 XVI Grand Prix de l'A.C.F. in Strasbourg. The race took place on 15 July 1922 and was run to a formula stipulating that maximum engine capacity should not exceed 2 litres and that the cars should be two-seaters weighing not less than 650 kg. The formula was to remain in force for four years producing "fields of brilliance to be unequalled for many years" it was the first rolling massed start in the history of Grand Prix motor-racing.

Three Ernest Henry-designed team cars were constructed for the event preceded by a similar prototype which served as a test, practice and spare car. When H.O.D. Segrave's assigned team car's engine was ruined by fire during practice he adopted the prototype instead as his race car. During the race the engines in all three Sunbeam cars failed and none finished.

After the Grand Prix one of the Sunbeam cars was entered in a Brooklands race, which it won. All four cars were subsequently sold to privateers and entered in various events with varied levels of success. Rarely for a complete British Works team of the Vintage era, all four cars survive. However, only one - chassis No 2 - can be considered original, while the other three embody genuine and original components and possess continuous histories

== The course ==
The course near the French city of Strasbourg was roughly a triangular of unpaved public roads with three near straights and three sharp corners. The start line where elaborate viewing tribunes and fronting ‘pits’ were built was at Duppigheim, first corner was at Entzheim, second at Innenheim, and final corner at Duttlenheim. It was 8.31 miles (13.37 km) long, requiring 60 laps to complete the 498.89 miles (802.89 km).

== The 1922 Grand Prix de l’ACF ==
In practice it became clear that the Fiat team had superior speed; Sunbeam axle ratio were lowered to improve speed. In the race, the Sunbeams could not match the performance of the Fiats, safe engine revolutions were exceeded and the inlet valves fractured; the Sunbeams were ‘put out of running’. Jean Chassagne in car No.9, the team leader and winner of that year's IoM T.T. with a modified 1921 Grand Prix Sunbeam retired after only five laps as did K. Lee Guinness in car No.16.

Segrave, in car No.21, the junior team member, in his second ever Grand Prix lasted ‘approximately half the full distance’. He was later to remember this event as ‘sheer misery’ (not least due to chemical fuel burns on his backside sustained by fuel spillage, the result of a hurried and untidy refuelling); he did hold a fourth place behind the Fiats for most of his race.

== 1922 Brooklands ==
On 30 September 1922 the Essex M.C. put over a series of Speed Championships. The 2-litre 8.5mile event was won in one of the Grand Prix Sunbeams by H.O.D. Segrave at 92.81 mph, fastest lap 99.81 mph. This was the only success these cars obtained for Sunbeam.

== Aftermath ==
The failure of the cars did irreparable damage to their designer Ernest Henry's previously shining reputation and career. Despite the mechanical weakness of its rear axle, the performance of the Fiat 804 convinced Louis Coatalen, Sunbeam's general manager, to use the design as inspiration for his winning series of Grand Prix cars between 1923 -1925.

The 1922 Sunbeam engines which failed during the race were repaired, the advanced servo operated brake systems were removed and installed in the 1923 Grand Prix Sunbeams. The gear lever was repositioned to the centre of the cockpit. A few years later after a ‘cooling period’ the cars were sold into private hands. All four 1922 team cars - including the prototype - survive today; a rare survival of a complete Grand Prix team of the vintage era. However, only one is original (Sunbeam No 2); the other three are genuine, authentic and resurrected (Sunbeam No 1, No 3 and No 4 respectively).

== Design ==
Designed by Ernest Henry in Suresnes, with input from Louis Coatalen and the Sunbeam Experimental Department Wolverhampton. Jean Chassagne was liaising and also in charge of testing.

Before the Great War Ernest Henry was a part of the successful and innovative ‘Charlatans’ who designed the first ever double overhead cams four valve Grand Prix engines for the 1912 Peugeot; the 1922 Sunbeam design follows similar principles. The aluminum body was the latest in streamlining and is typical of the Post Great War Henry design with the spare wheel carried longitudinally in the tail and braced by the large fuel tank.

The contemporary Wolverhampton Motor Car Registry records the prototype car being road-registered before three intended race cars followed as a batch. Each of the latter trio was finalised around its intended driver's requirements and preferences. The asymmetrically inclined valves (inlet 20 degrees and outlet 40 degrees from vertical) were a significant departure for Henry and may be attributable to Sunbeam and Coatalen whose interest in desaxé configuration dated to 1911. Another unusual detail was the engine mounted directly on the chassis frame similarly to the 1921 'invincible Talbot-Darracq'.

Following prototype testing at Brooklands and on the Isle of Man prior to the Grand Prix, modifications were instigated to the tail support bracket. Different carburetor configurations and different tyre types were tried, axle ratios experimented with, aero screens and mudguards were installed or removed as required.

=== Colour / trim ===
Body in British Racing Green, black wheels and black leather trim (fluted for team cars, flat panel prototype car).

=== Chassis ===
- Upswept chassis over front and back axles to lower centre of gravity.
- Three-piece machined and polished front axle; H section centre bolted to forged tubular end-pieces to resist torsional stress produced by front wheel brakes. Front cross member as well as channel section amidships and rear form the frame.
- Underslung polished semi-elliptical Jonas Woodhead and Sons springs (STD subsidiary) all around.
- Hartford shock absorbers fitted each corner (single front, double rear).
- High-geared worm and white-metal nut steering box with a cord bound spring-spoked steel steering wheel.
- Narrow streamlined all aluminium staggered two-seater body; spare wheel carried longitudinally in the tail. Louvred under-pan ran the length of the car.
- Wheelbase 8 ft 2 in, Track 3 ft 11in.
- Tyres tested at Brooklands and elsewhere prior to the 1922 Strasbourg Grand Prix on ‘Palmer Cord’ Beaded Edge 765x105 and similar ‘Dunlop Magnum Cord’. At Strasbourg during Practice leading to the G.P. ‘Dunlop Magnum Cord’ & ‘Dunlop Cord’ Beaded Edge 30x31/2. Raced in the Grand Prix on ‘Dunlop S.S. Cord’ Straight Sided 30x31/2 on split rim wheels.

=== Weight ===
- J Chassagne 13cwt 84 lb
- K. Lee Guinness 13cwt 101 lb
- H.O.D. Segrave 13cwt 57 lb

=== Engine ===
- Ernest Henry designed four-cylinder desaxé (reducing thrust against cylinder wall during the "power" stroke) cast-iron monobloc set on a separate barrel-shaped cast-aluminum crankcase mounted directly on the chassis frame.
- Twin overhead camshafts carried in split housings on the fixed cylinder head and operate the sixteen valves through thimble tappets. Four valves per cylinder 60 degrees asymmetrically inclined (inlet 20 degrees and outlet 40 degrees from vertical). The double valve springs secured by split, tapered collets and collar.
- The crankshaft is a balanced built-up type running in three ball bearings. Oil pipes pass externally along the webs of the shaft and held in place by liberally drilled, semi circular steel plates screwed to the webs to counteract centrifugal forces acting upon the pipes.
- Steel, H-section, fully machined connecting rods are fitted with four big-end bolts. Plain white metal big-end bearings and bronze bushes small-ends were employed. Access for fitting of the big-ends is provided by two panels offside below the exhaust ports. Domed aluminum pistons with two compression and one scraper ring.
- Train of ten cascading gears at front of the engine operate the camshafts, magnetos, oil and water pumps. The crankshaft gear drives the two magneto gears at crank speed. The two to one speed reduction to the camshafts takes place at the first stage of the gear train; all the remaining gears between the first intermediate gear and the gears at the camshafts are idlers.
- Bore and stroke 68x136mm, capacity 1975.6 cc
- Timing: inlet valve opens 10 degrees before TDC and exhaust valve closes 18 degrees after TDC; Inlet valve closes 30 degrees after bottom centre and exhaust valve opens 52 degrees before bottom centre.
- Inlet valve opening period 220 degrees, exhaust valve opening period 250 degrees. Maximum ignition advance 35 degrees. Tappet clearance 006" and 008". Piston speed 3792fpm @ 4250rpm. Compression 6.5 to 1 in the Grand Prix but 7.6 to 1 with different pistons in post-Works Brooklands racing.
- Power output 88 bhp at 4200rpm. Maximum rpm on bench test 4600. Max speed approximately 100 mph.
- Petrol consumption approximately 13m.p.g. RAC rating 11.4 hp.

=== Carburation ===
- Twin 40mm horizontal Solex bolted directly on the manifolds in the Grand Prix but twin Zenith triple diffuser carburettors and barrel throttle Claudel-Hobson were also tried.
- Fuel feed by pressure from 60-gallon tank positioned by leather-lined nickel-plated steel straps at rear.

=== Ignition ===
- Twin Scintilla magnetos mounted on the front of the timing gear case operated via Vernier couplings at crank speed.
- Two plugs per cylinder, one centrally placed in the cylinder head, 10 degrees inclined to the vertical and the other placed nearside on the inlet side of cylinder head.

=== Transmission ===
- Four forward and one reverse speed gearbox in unit with engine mounted directly on the chassis.
- Inverted cone fabric clutch carried on light ribbed steel flywheel. Hotchkiss drive; transverse driven by a worm gear reduction for servo motor braking system (removed after the G.P.).
- Open hollow propeller shaft with two Hooke – type universal joints at each end sloping upwards from gearbox to the rear axle.
- Straight cut crown wheel and pinion drive through a normal differential to the hollow half shafts.
- The crown wheel housing is offset towards the nearside.
- Gear ratio overall Top (14 tooth pinion, 55 tooth crown) 3.928:1; 3rd 4.6099:1; 2nd 6.383:1; 1st 10.942:1.
- Other ratio recorded 4.08:1.

=== Lubrication ===
- Dry sump lubrication.
- Pressure/scavenge cluster gear type oil pump driven directly from the gear train at front of the engine at near crank speed.
- High pressure lubrication is limited to the big – ends.
- Oil pressure is regulated through hand controlled visual feeds.
- Drain pipes in the valve covers returning surplus oil to the sump.
- Separate five gallon fabricated sheet brass oil tank slung under driver and riding mechanic seats.

=== Cooling ===
- Centrifugal water pump mounted on the front of the timing gear case and driven directly.
- Two branch pipe leads from the cylinder head to the radiator and four branch pipe from the pump to the cylinder jackets, entering on the exhaust valve side.
- Radiator is provided with by-pass pipe leading from top to bottom tank to counteract water pile-up in the top tank when pump is at full speed.
- Serck manufactured pressure relief valve radiator cap.

=== Braking System ===
- Brakes to all four wheels actuated by hand lever (rear) and foot pedal.
- Brake cables operated by Hispano Suiza type servo mechanism driven from the gearbox main shaft (removed after the Grand Prix), running over pulleys, adjustable by ratchets below the riding mechanic.
- The Perrot-type front brakes are ribbed light section steel and are larger diameter than rear; cast iron shoes.

=== Instruments ===
- Jaeger revolution counter driven from the forward end of the camshaft, Sunbeam oil pressure gauge, fuel tank air pressure gauge, twin magneto switches, twin glass oil restrictors.
- Under-reading of 300rpm on the Jaeger revolution counter was a contributing factor in over-stressing the engines during the race.
- Each dashboard and instrument arrangement was tailor-made to the requirements of the pilots

== History of individual cars ==
The Sunbeam Works records showing chassis and engine numbers, against a team driver did not survive; however, some records of chassis numbers raced at Brooklands did survive. Research of the history of individual cars derived from analysis of photographs and related period documents was carried out and published by historian William (Bill) Boddy, team car owner Neville Webb and Sunbeam specialist historian Bruce Dowell with varying conclusions. Works history is incomplete and therefore in some instances deduced. The post Works history and race record of the cars is generally agreed upon.

A prototype test car was constructed, tested and modified after which three team cars were assembled at the Sunbeam Wolverhapmpton Experimental Department. For the purpose of the Grand Prix the three Works team cars were designated Sunbeam I, II and III for Jean Chassagne (riding mechanic Robert Laly), Major H.O.D. Segrave (riding mechanic Jules Moriceau), K. Lee Guinness (riding mechanic Bill Perkins) respectively. The prototype test car became the Strasbourg team spare and was driven in practice by all three team members; "Guinness, Chassagne and myself [Segrave] put any amount of time on the course".

=== Chassis stamped 'No 1:22' ===
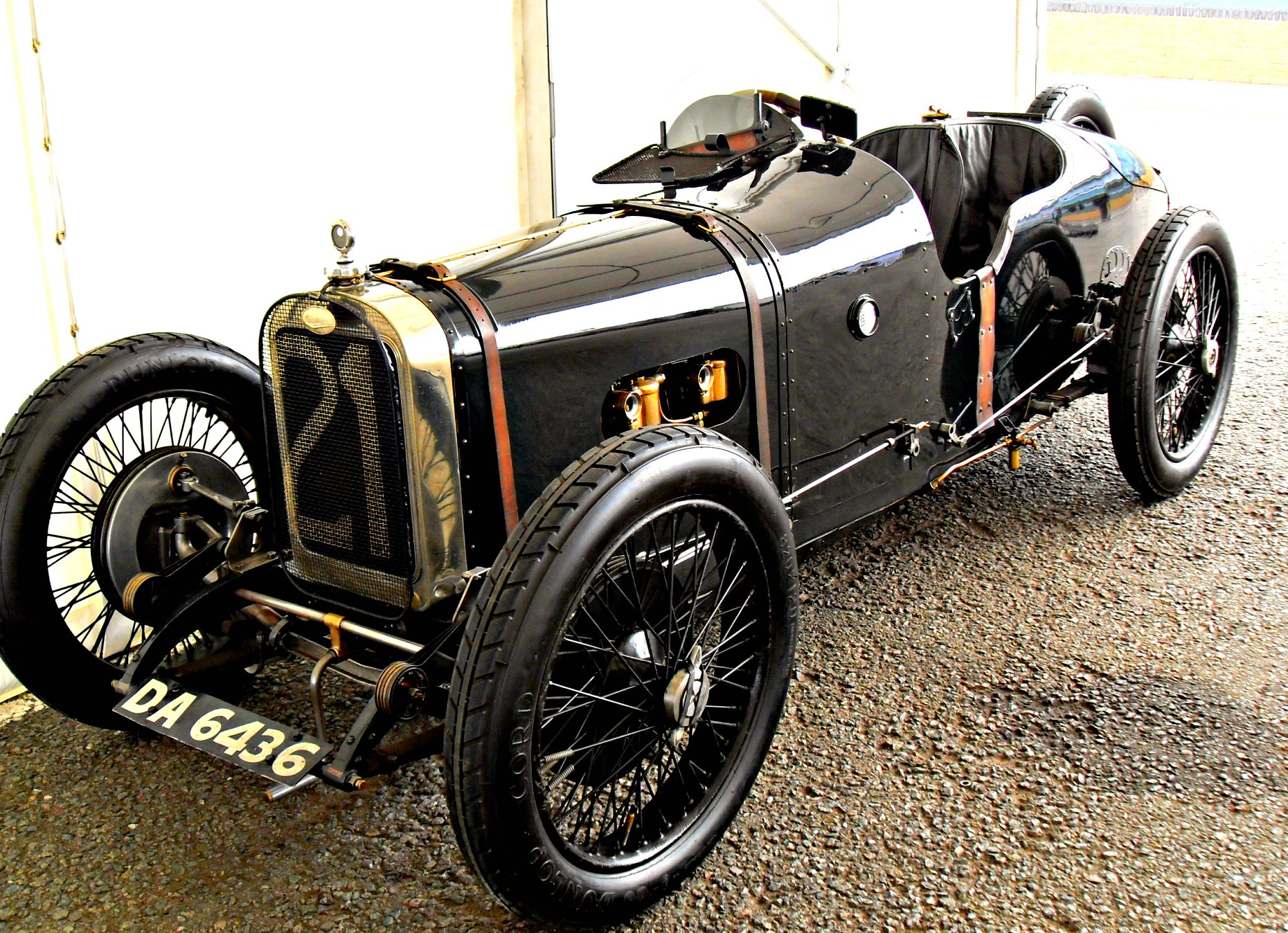
DA6436 at VSCC Donington in 2009

This was the prototype test car completed early in 1922 and on which the team gained experience subsequently built into the subsequent batch of three assigned 'team cars' intended to compete at Strasbourg.

This Chassis was previously thought to have been team car No.4 from the serial stamped prominently on cockpit and bulkhead plaques but not into the frame itself. In the 1970s an original number stamp was found on the front dumbirons, matching stamps on the other three frames. This read No.1.22 in matching original Sunbeam type face and 21st century forensic metallurgical examination of this stamping found no evidence of any alternative stamping in that position. Engine is stamped No.4 over-stamped 1. Identity plates attached to the firewall and cockpit stamped ‘Engine No.1’ and ‘Chassis No. 1’ were applied in the 1970s, after the car's original identity had been uncovered.

Registration number DA6436.

The first car to be built; unpainted it was tested by J Chassagne the liaison officer for the project at Brooklands; this resulted in variety of modifications notably re-configuring of the support bracket for the tail. It was shipped to the Isle of Man registered DA6436 and was tested again during practice for the 1922 Tourist Trophy and was found comparable to the 1922 3-litre Tourist Trophy Grand Prix Sunbeams. Later that year in Strasbourg, it was used by all three Team drivers for practice. When H.O.D. Segrave's assigned Team car was damaged by engine fire during practice, this spare car was race-prepared and driven by him in the Grand Prix. Post-works, it was found fire damaged; works and modifications to engine and body ensued and private entries in speed events were made before the war. In 1941 the engine was removed and Riley engine and ENV gearbox used, a year later the body was replaced with a new full width two-seater body. Post war it passed through several hands and in the early 1970s it was rebuilt and rebodied with a 1922 Strasbourg style body as an authentic example. (See footnote below.)

- 1922 Sunbeam Works
- 1922 Brooklands testing (unpainted), Jean Chassagne
- 1922 June IoM testing, J Chassagne, K. Lee Guinness, H.O.D. Segrave
- 1922 Strasbourg Spare / practice car, driven by all team members. After his own assigned car had been damaged by fire during practice, H.O.D. Segrave adopted this spare prototype car for the race.
- 1934 Jock Leith of Inverness for £10 "badly burnt extremely rusty", engine block and head cracked. Leith had the car rebuilt at Pavilion Road, Knightsbridge. Work included repair or replacement of cylinder block, pressure oiling was installed and accordingly the dash drip feed removed. Modified body installed with a 1924 cowled radiator, a "square stubby tail" replaced the original. ‘Motor Sport’ (October 1934) observed the works and reported "Chassis is stamped No. 4, so it is possibly a practice car". This attribution is incorrect since it was not the chassis but the cockpit and bulkhead plates which were stamped No. 4.
- 1935 March 26, Guy Griffith a motor dealer of London, W9 purchased the car from Jock Leith for £100 "fairly dilapidated" and said it was "dumped as she was ineligible to race". Griffith raised the compression using Martlett pistons, installed new Zenith triple diffuser and changed valve timing and offered it for sale in December 1935 for £200 "rebuilt last year" "many new parts".
- 1935 Donington opening meeting, Guy Griffith, DNF (accident, damaged bodywork, bent front axle)
- 1935 September 7 Southport 100, Guy Griffith No. 12
- 1937 G Ken Burness of London E.C. 3
- 1937 Donington 1st V.S.C.C. Donington Club Circuit, G Ken Burness, two podium places
- 1938 Prescott, G Ken Burness
- 1938 May 7 Donington, G Ken Burness
- 1938 August Poole Speed Trials, G Ken Burness (24.45sec)
- 1941 Major W K Johnson (Canadian) of Colnbrook Bucks "His car is labeled No. 4…the chassis having been completely stripped" (Autocar 7 February 1941). Riley radiator and supercharger. "Louis Giron worked on it"
- 1941 try-out on road with 1.5 litre Riley engine and ENV gearbox (Autocar 13 June 1941)
- 1942 Body replaced with a new full width two-seater body by John Wyer previously of Sunbeam.
- 1945? John P Grosscurth of Maidenhead Berks. "in bits"
- 1946 Raymond Edwin Grant of Cippenham for sale, engine rebuilt.
- 1946 Douglas Armstrong of Farnham Royal, Bucks, Editor of ‘The Motor’ and published for sale in 1948 April "much modified" for £225.
- 1948 Mrs Cooney of Chobham and Windsor for £250 labelled Chassis No. 4, Engine No. 4 registered EVB998
- 1948 Luton Hoo speed trials, Mrs. Cooney, "scarcely a runner"
- 1962 Colin Crabb for £50. Engine damage repaired.
- 1963/5 Sold to unknown owner
- 1973? Paul Grist. Rebuilt and rebodied in a 1922 Strasbourg style body. Hitherto unsuspected yet clearly original chassis stamping uncovered when heavily-painted chassis frame stripped bare. Replacement engine and dash/bulkhead plates then stamped with No. 1.22, car re-registered as DA6436
- 1974 July Dijon Parade, Phil Hill
- 1978 Bill Lake. Two big Solex carburetors installed
- 1978 Prescott Hill-climb, Bill Lake
- 1978 Goodwood, Bill Lake
- 1984 Tim Hewison of Melbourne Australia
- 1985 Nick Langford & John Sheard of O’Neil Sheard of Australia.
- 1989 Graham Little purchased via Coys
- 1999 Silverstone "100 years of Sunbeam"
- 2004 Private Collection East Sussex, England

=== Chassis stamped 'No 2.22' ===
Nicknamed by some ‘The Time Warp Car’. Chassis stamped no.2.22. Engine brass plate stamped no.2. Registration DA6468.

1922 Strasbourg Grand Prix race no.21 for Major H.O.D. Segrave (riding mechanic Jules Moriceau). damaged in practice fire and set aside, Segrave using spare prototype test car instead on race day. Segrave may have then used this car for the 1922 Brooklands Essex M.C. Speed Championships, which he won – the only Works success of any Strasbourg car. Subsequent pre-war history is largely unknown - photographed in the 1920s with Fred Caswell at the Works and may have been subsequently owned by him. Postwar it was owned by predominantly three long term owners and participated in occasional V.S.C.C. events; it thus remains exceptionally original and complete retaining all its components including body, leather seats and of course all running gear. (See footnote below.)

- 1922 Sunbeam Works
- 1922 Strasbourg G.P. Team car No. 21 assigned to Major H. O. D. Segrave (riding mechanic Jules Moriceau) and used in practice until damaged by engine fire and set aside unraced.
- 1922 Sunbeam Works Brooklands Essex M.C. Speed Championships Major H.O.D. Segrave 92.81 mph, fastest lap 99.81 mph 1st
- 1920s Photographed with Fred Caswell at the works.

John Grosscurth of Maidenhead.

- 1946 Elstree Aerodrome V.S.C.C. Speed Trials No. 190 (John C. Purnell of Bourne End, Bucks).
- 1946 Raymond Edwin Grant of Chippenham for resale
- 1946 Douglas Armstrong of Farnham Royal, Bucks, Editor of ‘The Motor’ "reputed Segrave car" for £200
- 1948 David Llewellyn Allen of Sheet's Heath, Brookwood, Surrey. Modified the dashboard. V.S.C.C. events including: Silverstone (1950 June 24), Goodwood, Prescott, Seaman Trophy, 3rd.
- 1960 March, Phillip Ashley Mann (V.S.C.C. President 1969–1971) of Dulwich Village, London. V.S.C.C. events including Silverstone
- 1968 Geoffrey Thomas Geer of Sevenoak Kent for £1,500.
- 1971 Silverstone STD Parade (M Geer)
- 1999 Silverstone "100 years of Sunbeam"
- 2009 Private Collection England
- 2009 Sold at auction by Bonhams for £463,500

=== Chassis stamped 'No 3.22' ===
Chassis stamped no.1. Engine stamped no.1. Registration – not registered.

1922 Strasbourg Grand Prix race no.9 for Jean Chassagne (riding mechanic Robert Laly) was shipped in 1925 to Sydney Australia for the racing driver Hope Bartlett; it successfully competed in his and subsequent hands and continued to be developed; body was gradually altered and then removed by 1948; engine was replaced in 1940 with an Oldsmobile engine; other engine, axle and various components were fitted as needed. In 1964 recovery of original 1922 components and resurrection of the car commenced. (See footnote below.)

- 1922 Sunbeam Works
- 1922 Strasbourg G.P. Team car No. 9 driven by Jean Chassagne (riding mechanic Robert Laly). Retired 5th lap
- 1925 December Hope Bartlett of Sydney Australia from Williams Bros.
- 1926 Maroubra Speedway (Hope Bartlett)
- 1927 New Zealand Cup Muriwai 2nd(Hope Bartlett)
- 1928 Russell Taylor of Sydney, director of Maroubra Speedway via Advanx Trye Co.
- 1930 Unknown enthusiast.
- 1932 F Staughton of Melbourne- who replaced the rear body section.
- 1932 Maldon Hill-climb (F Staughton).
- 1935 Canberra Sprint (F Staughton).
- 1935 M A Moulden of Adelaide who rebuild the car completely.
- 1936 Centenary Victor Harbor G.P. entered but did not start (M A Moulden)
- 1937 October Lobethal Hill Climb 3rd (M A Moulden)
- 1938 January South Australian G.P. – DNF (M A Moulden)
- 1939 Ross Haig of Mt Gambier.
- 1940 Les D (Sui) Robinson of Naracoorte SA. Engine damaged and replaced with 1930 Oldsmobile engine. Competed in local events.
- 1946 Kingsley Osbourne of Mt Gambier. Fitted with Ford V8 engine and Morris radiator. Competed in local events.
- 1947 January 27 Ballarat Victoria (Kingsley Osbourne & L D Robinson)
- 1948 Ben Tillet Adelaide
- 1948 L D Robinson. Original body removed and sports body fitted.
- 1949 Vintage Festival Road Races, Nuriootpa S.A. 5th (L D Robinson)
- 1949 Max Collins of Mt Gambier. Original axle replaced with solid beam axle.
- 1949 Vintage Festival Road Race, Nuriootpa SA. 5th
- 1951 Clarke of Mt Gambier.
- 1960 G R Schmidt of Mt Gambier.
- 1964 Neville Webb of Adelaide. Recovered many original components and resurrected the car with a 1.5 litre Sunbeam race engine; the original 1922 G.P. 2 litre engine is with the car.

=== Chassis stamped 'No 4.22' ===
Chassis stamped No. 3 (NS) also stamped 4.22 to both dumbirons; both stamps in Sunbeam Works typeface. Engine stamped No.3 with a further No.4 both in Sunbeam Works typeface. A period dashboard plate stamped chassis and engine No.3 visible in 1930s photographs. Oliver Heal and Bruce Dowell, as well as Neville Webb in his book on the Strasbourg Sunbeams identified this car as chassis no.3. Registration – not currently registered

1922 Strasbourg Grand Prix race no.16 for K. Lee Guinness and riding mechanic Bill Perkins. It may have been H.O.D. Segrave car for the 1922 Brooklands Essex M.C. Speed Championships. It was sold by the Works and in private hands continued to race at Brooklands 1926 and 1930; subsequently used for touring; tail modified in 1936. In a few hands postwar before it was added in 1986 to the Evert Louwman National Dutch Motor Museum, Netherland and from there in 1994 to the Toyota Motor Museum, Japan where it remains a genuine example of the 1922 Strasbourg Sunbeams. (See footnote below.)

- 1922 Sunbeam Works
- 1922 Strasbourg G.P. Team car No.16 driven by K. Lee Guinness (riding mechanic Bill Perkins). Retired 5th lap.
- 1922 Sunbeam Works Brooklands Essex M.C. Speed Championships H.O.D. Segrave 1st
- 1926 J S Spencer
- 1926 Brooklands ‘Easter Private Competitors Handicap’. Won at 91.88 mph from 21sec mark, after lapping at 98.43; private entry J S Spencer supported by Bill Perkins of Sunbeam Works.
- 1930 K Kenward Eggar & Mervyn Crickmay
- 1930 Brooklands " BRDC 500 Mile Race" No. 27. lost a big end or broken con-rod and DNF(K Kenward Eggar & Mervyn Crickmay).
- 1930 J. L. of Fort William, Inverness-shire, Scotland carried out works to car No. 3 registered RU-2497 (‘Autocar’ 1930 April 25)
- 1933 Lee Guinness Grand Prix car used regularly in Scotland (Motor Sport 1933 January)
- 1936 Tegryd Jones of Whetstone N20 registration no. CHX 882 "a solicitor …his wife…occupies the very narrow mechanics seat as passenger on long journeys" (Autocar 13 June 1941). Original tail modified and shortened.
- 1939 Lt K J Wallace serving in the Middle East but had not taken delivery of the car (Motor Sport December 1941).
- 1946 Terence P Breen of Whetstone, N20.
- 1960 Cameron Millar of Potters Bar who fitted a twin SUs and perhaps a new fuel tank
- 1960 Silverstone – twice (Cameron Millar)
- 1971 Silverstone STD Parade (Cameron Miller).
- 1986 Evert Louwman National Dutch Motor Museum, Netherland.
- 1994 Toyota Motor Museum, Japan.

== 1922 Strasbourg Grand Prix Other Competitors ==
Eighteen European cars positions set by ballot as follows:

Three Fiat 804 (Italy): 6 cylinder of 65mm x 100mm (1,991c.c.), twin o.h.c., Fiat carburettor; Scintilla magneto; giving 96 b.h.p. at 5,500 r.p.m. Wheelbase: 8’ 2.5". Track: 3’11". Unladen weight 1,489 lbs. Maximum speed: 105–110 m.p.h.

Four Bugatti Type 30 (France): standard modified chassis with 8 cylinder o.h.c. engine, bore and stroke: 60mm x 88mm (1,990c.c.), 3 valves per cylinder, 2 Zenith carburetors; Bosch magneto. Unladen weight: 1,624 lbs. Wheelbase: 8’4.5". Track: 3’11.25". Maximum speed 98m.p.h. Two-seater barrel body.

Three Ballot 2LS (France): 4 cylinder, bore and stroke: 69.9mm x 130mm (1,986c.c.); twin o.h.c., 4 valves per cylinder, Zenith carburetor, Scintilla Magnetos; giving 90b.h.p. at 5,000rpm. Wheelbase: 9’2". Track: 4’3". Unladen weight 1,848 lbs. Maximum speed 100–105 m.p.h. Streamlined barrel-bodied.

Three Rolland Pilain A22 (France): 8 cylinder, bore and stroke: 59.2mm x 90mm (1,968c.c.); twin o.h.c., Zenith carburetor; Scintilla magneto, Wheelbase 8’2". Track: front 3’11", rear 3’7". Dry weight: 1,624 lb. Maximum speed 100 mph. Hydraulic font brakes; positively closed valve system. Left hand drive.

Two Aston Martin G.P. (Britain): 4 cylinder, bore and stroke: 65mm x 112mm (1,486c.c.); twin o.h.c., 4 valves per cylinder; giving 54b.h.p. at 4,500r.p.m. Claudel Hobson carburetor; Bosch magneto. Wheelbase: 8’0". Track: 4’3". Unladen weight: 1,456 lbs. Maximum speed 95m.p.h.

== 1922 Strasbourg Grand Prix Classification ==
Fastest lap: Pietro Bordino Fiat 804 5:43

- 1 4 Felice Nazzaro Fiat 804 60 6h17m17.0 averaged approx. 79 mph
- 2 12 Pierre De Vizcaya Bugatti 30 60 7h15m09.8
- 3 22 Pierre Marco Bugatti 30 60 7h48m04.02
- 4 11 Pietro Bordino Fiat 804 58 Rear axle, crash
- 5 18 Jacques Mones-Maury Bugatti 30 57 +3 laps
- Ret 17 Biagio Nazzaro Fiat 804 51 Rear axle, fatal crash
- Ret 14 Giulio Foresti Ballot 2LS 44 Engine
- Ret 7 Jules Goux Ballot 2LS 31 Crash
- Ret 8 Clive Gallop Aston Martin G.P. 30 Engine
- Ret 21 Henry Segrave Sunbeam 29 Engine
- Ret 15 Louis Zborowski Aston Martin G.P. 19 Engine
- Ret 20 Giulio Masetti Ballot 2LS 15 Engine
- Ret 5 Ernest Friderich Bugatti 30 14 Engine
- Ret 13 Victor Hemery Rolland Pilain A22 12 Overheating
- Ret 16 Kenelm Lee Guinness Sunbeam 5 Engine
- Ret 9 Jean Chassagne Sunbeam 5 Engine
- Ret 6 Albert Guyot Rolland Pilain A22 2 Engine
- Ret 19 Louis Wagner Rolland Pilain A22 2 Engine

== Research sources ==
- The Boys’ Life of Sir Henry Segrave, Capt. Malcolm Campbell and J Wentworth Day
- The British Competition Car, Cyril Posthumus, 1959
- Carbooks Volume 22 1922, Michael Frostick (editor)
- The Classic Twin-Cam Engine, Griffith Borgeson, 1981
- Directory of Historic Racing Cars, Denis Jenkinson, 1987
- Fifty Years with the Speed Kings, David McDonald (Dunlop Mac), 1961
- The French Grand Prix, Hodges, 1967
- Grand Prix de L’A.C.F. Strasbourg 1922 75eme Anniversaire, Bernard Truche, 1997
- The History of Brooklands 1906–1940, William Boddy, 1957
- My Life at the Sunbeam 1920–1935, Norman Cliff
- The Lonsdale Library Motor Racing, Earl Howe & Many Authorities
- Motoring Entente, Ian Nickols and Kent Karslake, 1956
- The Lure of Speed, H.O.D. Segrave, 1928
- Racing Cars Between 1919 and 1939, T.A.S.O. Mathieson, 1963
- Racing Cars and Record Breakers 1898–1921, T R Nicholson, 1971
- The Roaring Twenties, Cyril Posthumus, 1980
- Sir Henry Segrave, Cyril Posthumus, 1961
- The Strasbourg Sunbeam, Neville S Webb, 2006
- Sunbeam Racing Cars, Anthony S Heal, 1989
- The Vanishing Litres, Rex Hays, 1957
- The Vintage Motor Car, Cecil Clutton and John Stanford, 1954
- Wall Smacker, Peter De Paolo, 1935
- Famous Racing Cars, David Hodges
- Great Racing Divers, edited by David Hodges, 1966
- The French Grand Prix, David Hodges
- Grand Prix and Sports Cars, Drawn by Res Hays
- Seventeen Sports Cars 1919–1930, Peter Hull and Nigel Arnold-Foster

=== Magazines and publications ===
- Autocar 1922 (3 June, 7 July, 14 July and 22 July), 1930, 1941
- Automobile 2009 (April)
- Bonham’s Auction entry, Keith Taylor, 2009
- L’automobiliste no. 23, Jean Chassagne, Robert Jarraud, Mai/Juin 1971
- Les Miroir des Sports 1922
- The Motor 1922 (17 May and 22 July)
- Motorsport 1933, 1934, 1935, 1938, 1939, 1941 1948, 1979
- Old Motor 1981
- Omnia 1922
- V.S.C.C. Bulletin summer & autumn, Jean Chassagne & Ernest Henry, Oliver Heal, 2002

=== Further references ===
- The Beaulieu Photographic and Document Library and archive
- David Allen Notes
- The TASO Mathieson & K Taylor Photographic and Document Archive
- The V.S.C.C. photographic and Document Library and Archive
- The Webb Photographic and Documents Archive

=== Internet sources ===
- 1922 Strasbourg Grand Prix Sunbeam – YouTube 1922 Strasbourg Grand Prix Sunbeam
- Sunbeam Talbot Darracq Register Sunbeam Talbot Darracq Register
- Bibliothèque nationale de France En ce moment
- LAT Photographic Archive Motorsport Images | Iconic Racing Moments Captured
- Austin Harris Austin Harris photos
- Grand Prix History Grand Prix History
- Grand Prix Sunbeams – YouTube GRAND PRIX SUNBEAMS - YouTube
- Sunbeam Grand Prix 1922 in Japan – YouTube Sunbeam Grand Prix 1922

== Footnotes ==
=== Footnotes previously attributed to identity 'Sunbeam I' ===
- The identity of Sunbeam I in the 1922 Strasbourg G.P. is derived from comparing photographs of the Sunbeam cars in 1922 with early photographs of the car after it was imported to Australia; as the body did not survive, comparing the appearance of the car today is unavailing.
- Images in Australia in 1925 and 1938 showing the following features in this car: scuttle shape, absence of third scuttle blister, rear bonnet strap bracket position, single tail strap – all match J Chassagne race no.9. A 1925 Australian publication corroborate J Chassagne attribution.
- All three team cars had fluted seats and no visible tail rivets.
- The history from 1925 to 1964 is derived from The Strasbourg Sunbeam, Neville S Webb, 2006 pp. 62–63 (numbering 2–15).

=== Footnotes previously attributed to identity Sunbeam II ===
- The flat scuttle shape of H.O.D. Segrave race no. 21 in the 1922 Strasbourg G.P. is unmistakable and ties it with the car today corroborated by the double row of parallel rivets securing the connecting strip, fuel pump rear bracket forward of the connecting strip, tax disc rivets position, wider fuel collar touching trim, gap between fixed trim and the connecting strip and a third 1/2 scuttle blister – all unique to car no. 21 and visible solely in this car today.
- This is further corroborated by the editor of ‘Motor Sport’ Douglas A Armstrong, who owned this car in 1946 'reputed Segrave car'.
- All three team cars had fluted seats and no visible tail rivets.
- The identity of Sunbeam II in the 1922 Brooklands Essex M.C. Speed Championships is derived from observation made in The Strasbourg Sunbeam, Neville S Webb, 2006 p. 81 and Brooklands chassis numbers recorded in.
- Subsequent history is derived from the original registration book and sale receipts, as well as, ‘Old Motor’ 1981 January by D A Armstrong, "Motor Sport" 1946 August, ‘Motor Sport’ 1948 March and The Strasbourg Sunbeam, Neville S Webb, 2006 pp. 71, 83 (numbering 5–7).

=== Footnotes previously attributed to identity Sunbeam III ===
- Although there has been some confusion regarding the chassis number of this car (Sunbeam III) due to multiple chassis stamps, its identity as chassis no.3 is confirmed by the 1926 record of Bill Perkins – Sunbeam Works engineer and riding mechanic on this car in the 1922 G.P.; corroborated by dashboard plate visible in a 1938 photograph and accompanying article as well as later article from 1941 and a 1960 document. The identity of this car as chassis no.3 is confirmed by Oliver Heal and Bruce Dowell as well as Neville Webb.
- The acutely upswept scuttle shape of K. Lee Guinness car no.16 in the 1922 Strasbourg G.P. is unmistakable and ties it with the car today and RU-2497 in 1930 Scotland this is further corroborated "The car was No.3".
- The chassis number (No.3) ties it to J S Spencer car at Brooklands in 1926 where it was supported by K. Lee Guinness 1922 G.P. riding mechanic Bill Perkins.
- The identity of Sunbeam III in the 1922 Strasbourg G.P. is further corroborated by: wider collar fuel inlet set some 3’’ from the trim, the position of the tax disc, the front strap buckle position, the gap between the trim and connecting strip and the connecting strip rivets – all characteristic of car no. 16 and visible post-works; all three team cars have fluted seats and no visible tail rivets. Compare with The Strasbourg Sunbeam, Neville S Webb, 2006 p. 86 and The TASO Mathieson & K Taylor Photographic and Document Archive (race No. 11). Also and The Strasbourg Sunbeam, Neville S Webb, 2006 images p. 22.
- The nearside bonnet slots venting the carburetors is also a unique feature and ties J S Spencer car at Brooklands 1926 with J. L. of Fort William, Inverness-shire, Scotland, K Kenward Eggar & Mervyn Crickmay in the 1930 Brooklands " BRDC 500 Mile Race" and Terence P Breen in 1946. Note that in Strasbourg, the three Team cars all had blister covering the carburettors which all but Sunbeam III retained post-Works: Sunbeam I until at least 1938 Lobethal (from) Sunbeam II until the 1960s Silverstone and the Test / Practice car until at least 1939 Poole Trials.
- The double tail strap visible solely on K. Lee Guinness car no.16 in the 1922 Strasbourg G.P. ties it with H.O.D. Segrave at the 1922 Brooklands Essex M.C. race, J S Spencer in the 1926 Brooklands Easter event and Eggar & Crickmay in the 1930 Brooklands "500 Mile Race"; of course, any of the Team cars may have been fitted with a double tail strap after the 1922 Grand Prix making this identification using this particular feature uncertain but it would appear that none but this car were.
- Race No.27 visible in the 1930 Brooklands " BRDC 500 Mile Race" ties this car with the later ownership of Tegryd Jones of Whetstone. Subsequent postwar ownership is confirmed by David Allen, Neville Webb., Oliver Heal and Bruce Dowell.

=== Footnotes previously attributed to 'test/practice car' ===
- Oliver Heal and Bruce Dowell, as well as Neville Webb in his book on the Strasbourg Sunbeams, identified this car as chassis no.4, the test car which was ruined by fire before the race. Further research by Bruce Dowell has concluded this is untrue

- This was the first car to be built and chassis may not have been stamped; by 1934 dashboard/bulkhead plaques were labelled No.4; confirmed by a 1941 article but from later findings plainly not stripped 'of paint' to reveal original chassis stamp. Reliance upon the attached plate numbering saw the 1948 Bill of Sale and the official Log book. Some of this is clearly inaccurate since original chassis stamp '1.22' was found on front dumbirons when they were stripped to bare metal in 1970s. Identity plates attached to bulkhead and dashboard bear engine and chassis no.1 but were made and fitted then.
- The original body of the test/practice car was modified by 1934 and disposed of in 1942; no Post-Works photographs showing the unmodified original body survive; it is therefore impossible to verify its identity, which will have to remain speculative.
- Three details might indicate provenance: the chassis number, the seat trim and its condition on discovery – all suggesting this is the test/practice car. ‘Motor Sport’ (October 1934) observed "Chassis is stamped No. 4, so it is possibly a practice car".
- All three team cars had fluted seats and no visible tail rivets; whereas, the test/practice car had flat panelled seats; Sunbeam I, II and III all had fluted seats – this car must therefore have been the fourth test/practice car.
- The cylinder block of the spare car suffered fire damage during practice; this ties it to this car, which was found "badly burnt extremely rusty". Of course, any of the cars could have suffered fire damage post Works but none but this car burned during practice was reported to have suffered fire damage to the engine resulting in cracked cylinder block which was later replaced.
- The Post-Works history is known from 1934 and can be derived from The Strasbourg Sunbeam, Neville S Webb, 2006 pp. 123–126 in combination with Motor Sport 1934 October, Autocar 7 February 1941, Autocar 13 June 1941, The Motor ‘for sale’ April 1948, Bill of Sale 15 April 1948, Motor Sport August 1979, V.S.C.C. Bulletin Summer 1994.
