= 210 Isabella =

Main-belt asteroid

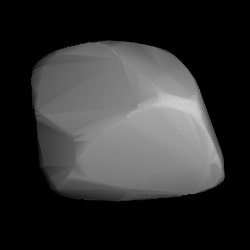
- 3D convex shape model of 210 Isabella

Discovery
- Discovered by: Johann Palisa
- Discovery date: 12 November 1879

Designations
- Pronunciation: /ɪzəˈbɛlə/
- Alternative designations: A879 VA, 1953 EZ_{1} 1962 BF
- Minor planet category: Main belt (Nemesis)

Orbital characteristics
- Epoch 31 July 2016 (JD 2457600.5)
- Uncertainty parameter 0
- Observation arc: 131.26 yr (47943 d)
- Aphelion: 3.0567 AU (457.28 Gm)
- Perihelion: 2.3892 AU (357.42 Gm)
- Semi-major axis: 2.7230 AU (407.36 Gm)
- Eccentricity: 0.12257
- Orbital period (sidereal): 4.493 yr (1,641.2 d)
- Average orbital speed: 18.05 km/s
- Mean anomaly: 153.338°
- Mean motion: 0° 13^{m} 9.66^{s} / day
- Inclination: 5.2600°
- Longitude of ascending node: 32.582°
- Argument of perihelion: 15.041°

Physical characteristics
- Dimensions: 86.65±2.3 km 73.70±8.47 km (composite estimate)
- Mass: (4.5±1.9)×10^{17} kg (Note: Calculated from its standard gravitational parameter GM = 0.030±0.013 km^{3}/s^{2}.)
- Mean density: 1.33 g/cm^{3} (Note: Assuming a diameter of 86.7 km.)
- Synodic rotation period: 6.672 h (0.2780 d)
- Geometric albedo: 0.0436±0.002
- Spectral type: CF
- Apparent magnitude: 12.2 (peak)
- Absolute magnitude (H): 9.33

210 Isabella is a large and dark asteroid from the central asteroid belt, approximately 80 kilometers in diameter. It was discovered in Pola by Johann Palisa on 12 November 1879. The origin of the name is unknown. It is orbiting at a distance of 2.72 AU from the Sun with an eccentricity of 0.12 and a period of 4.49 yr. The orbital plane is inclined at an angle of 5.26° to the plane of the ecliptic.

The asteroid is probably composed of material similar to carbonaceous chondrites. It is classified as a member of the Nemesis family of asteroids. Estimates of the diameter range from 74 to 87 km. It is spinning with a period of 6.67 h.
