= Datsun 210 =

The Datsun 210 name is used to describe a few different Nissan automobiles from 1959 until 1982:

- 1957–1959 — The internal code for what was to become the long-running Nissan Bluebird nameplate. Usually marketed as the Datsun 1000 or 1200, various versions received the chassis codes 114, 115, and 211, although "210" is the most commonly used name to describe this series of cars. The earliest 1957/58 210 s were the first commercial production and only 1440 cars are supposed to have left the assembly lines.
- 1973–1978 — The third generation Nissan Sunny subcompact carried the B210 chassis code and was sold as the Datsun B210 in North America
- 1978–1982 — For model years 1979 through 1982, the fourth generation Sunny (B310) was sold as the Datsun 210 in North America
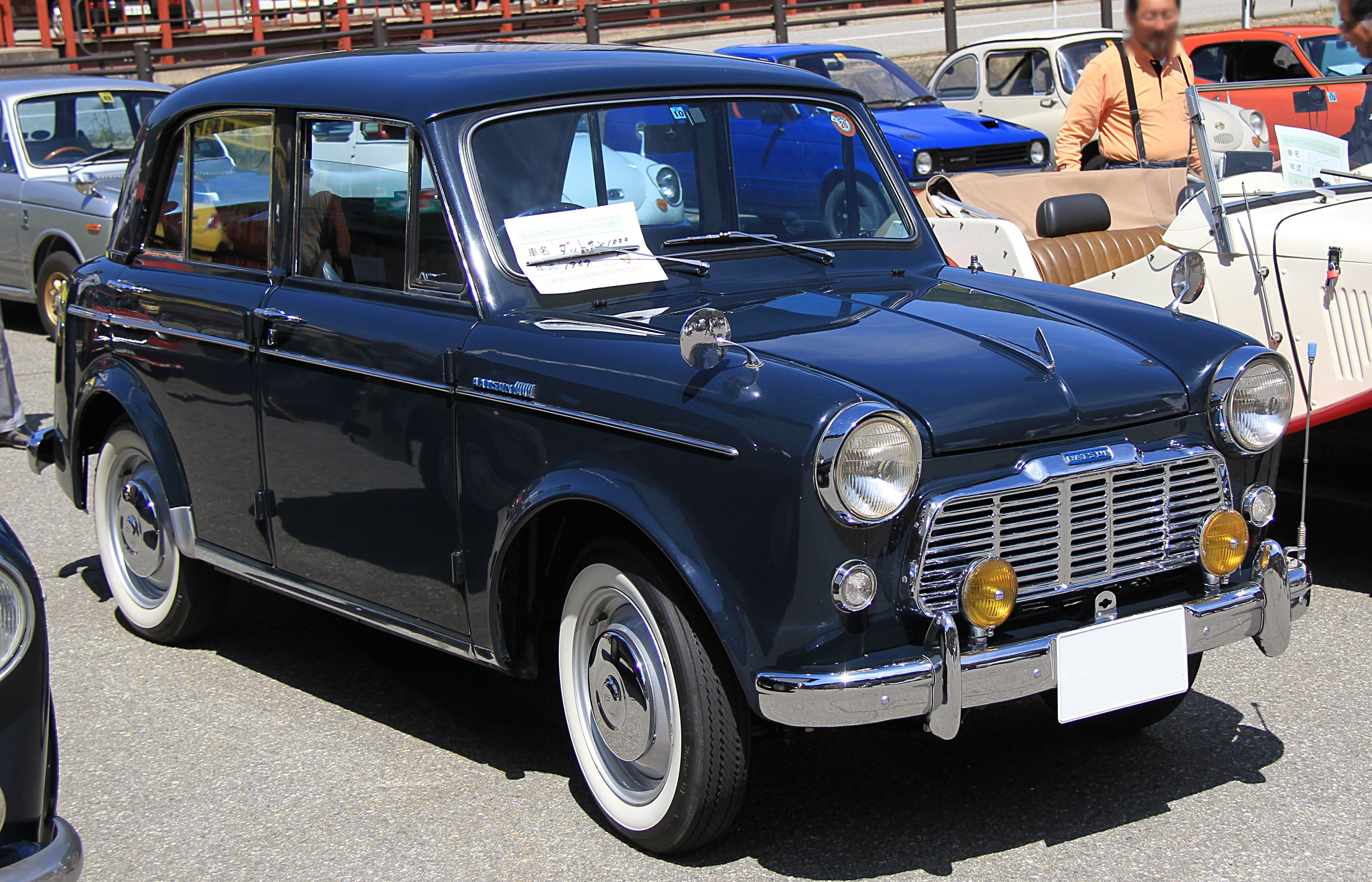
Datsun 1000 (210-series, 1957–1959)

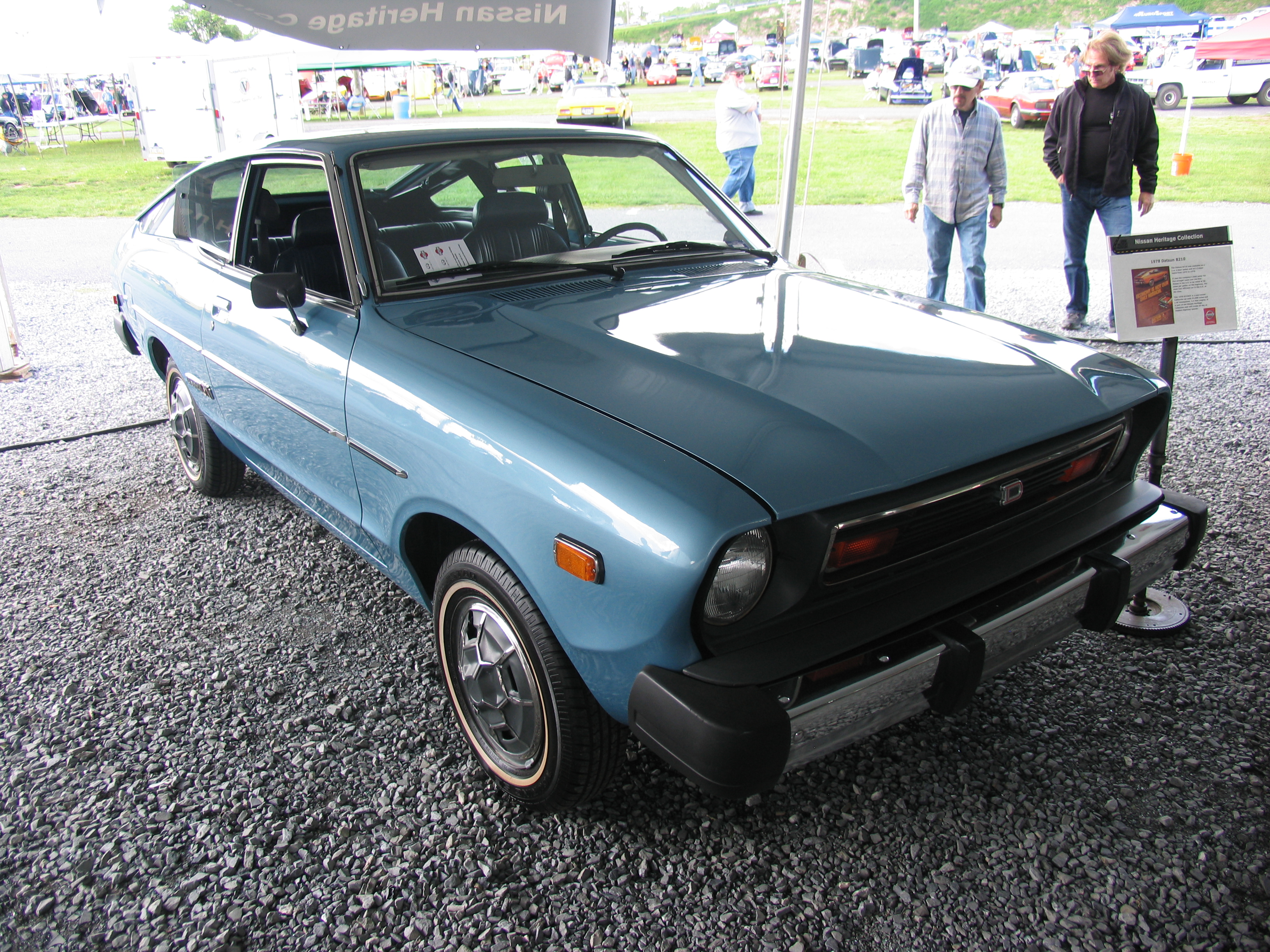
Datsun B210 (MY 1974–1978)

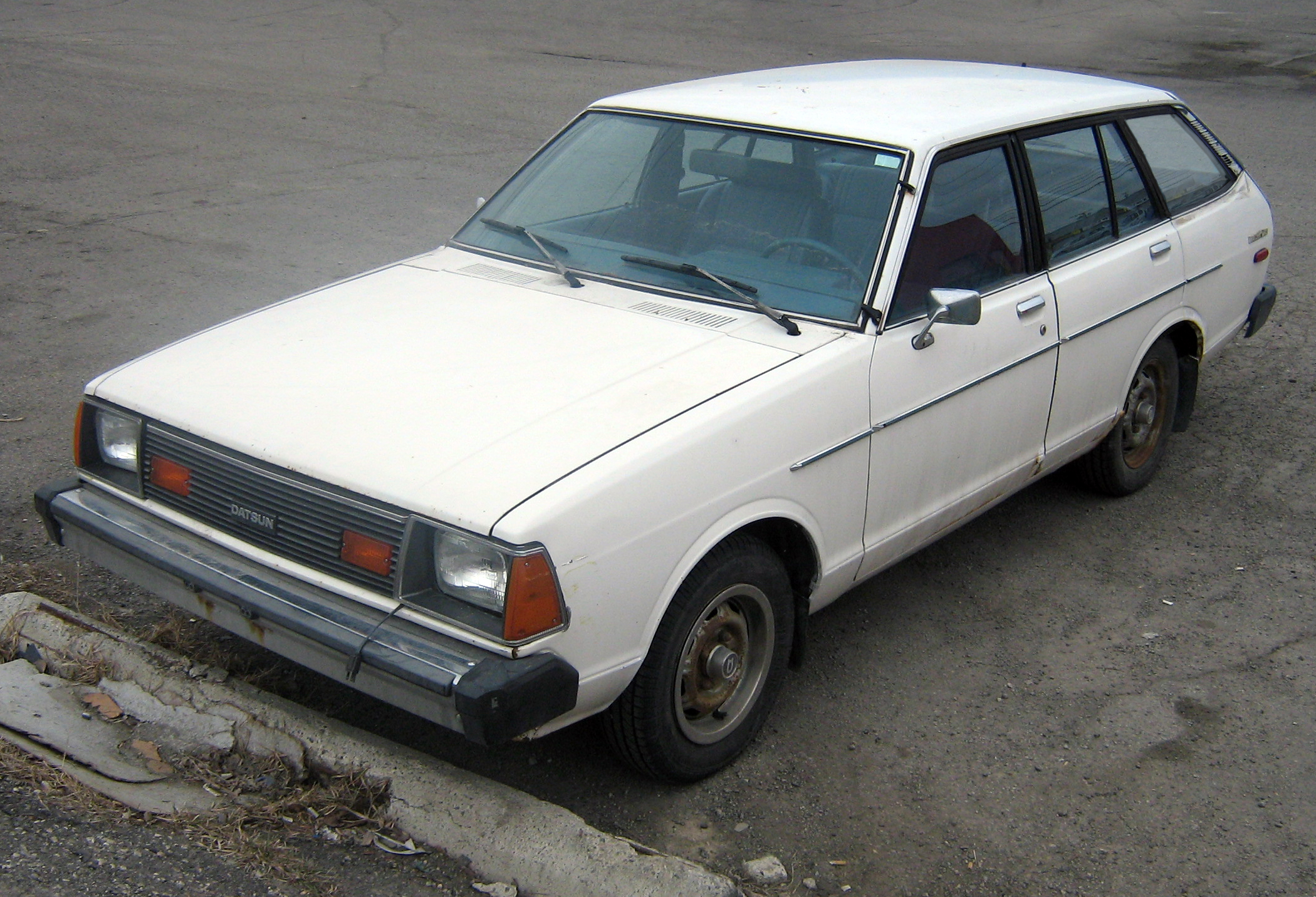
Datsun 210 (MY 1979–1982)
